= List of songs recorded by Alisha Chinai =

Alisha Chinoy is an Indian singer. her songs list is given below:

== Hindi film songs ==
=== 1980s ===
Year	Film	Song	Composer(s)	Writer(s)	Co-artist(s)
1985	Adventures of Tarzan	"Jile Le"	Bappi Lahiri	Anjaan	Bappi Lahiri
1985	Adventures of Tarzan	"Tarzan My Tarzan"	Bappi Lahiri	Anjaan	
1985	Adventures of Tarzan	"Tarzan My Tarzan" V2	Bappi Lahiri	Anjaan	
1986	Main Balwaan	"Sare Shehar Mein Hai Ek Deewana"	Bappi Lahiri	Anjaan	Bappi Lahiri
1986	Main Balwaan	"Saans Teri"	Bappi Lahiri	Anjaan	Bappi Lahiri
1986	Main Balwaan	"Padosi Teri Murgi"	Bappi Lahiri	Anjaan	Bappi Lahiri
1986	Sheela	"Us mein Kya Hai"	Bappi Lahiri	Anjaan	
1986	Sheela	"Bahon Mein Narmi"	Bappi Lahiri	Anjaan	Bappi Lahiri
1986	Shingora	"Pyaar To Mujhe"	Kirti Anuraag	Ram Siddharth	
1986	Jalwa	"Let's Do It"	Anand–Milind	Sameer	
1986	Sadak Chhap	"Jab Tu Mila"	Bappi Lahiri	Anjaan	
1987	Dance Dance	"Zubi Zubi"	Bappi Lahiri	Anjaan	
1987	Dance Dance	"Yaar Mera Kho Gaya"	Bappi Lahiri	Anjaan	
1987	Dance Dance	"Dance Dance"	Bappi Lahiri	Anjaan	Vijay Benedict
1987	Dance Dance	"Super Dancer"	Bappi Lahiri	Anjaan	Bappi Lahiri
1987	Dance Dance	"Aapke Aamne Pehli Baar"	Bappi Lahiri	Anjaan	
1987	Dance Dance	"Dil Mera Todo Na"	Bappi Lahiri	Anjaan	
1987	Dance Dance	"Zindagi Meri Dance Dance"	Bappi Lahiri	Anjaan	Vijay Benedict
1987	Dance Dance	"Romeo"	Bappi Lahiri	Anjaan	Vijay Benedict
1987	Insaaf	"Main Hu Tu Hai"	Laxmikant–Pyarelal	Farooque Qaiser	
1987	Marte Dam Tak	"Dheere Dheere kholungi"	Ravindra Jain	Ravindra Jain	Shakti Kapoor
1987	Mr. India	"Kaate Nahin Katate"	Laxmikant–Pyarelal	Javed Akhtar	Kishore Kumar
1988	Aaj Ke Angaare	"Hum Bachche Hanste Hansate Hai"	Bappi Lahiri	Anjaan	Uttara Kelkar
1988	Aaj Ke Angaare	"Hum Hai Aaj Ke Angaare, Pyar Ke Raaste"	Bappi Lahiri	Anjaan	
1988	Aaj Ke Angaare	"Jao Jao Dharti Pe Jao, Ek Baar AasmanKe Paar"	Bappi Lahiri	Anjaan	Vijay Benedict
1988	Aakhri Adaalat	"Aaj Nahin To Kal"	Anu Malik	Anjaan	Anu Malik
1988	Aakhri Adaalat	"Solah Khatam"	Anu Malik	Anjaan	
1988	Commando	"Its a Dance Party"	Bappi Lahiri	Anjaan	Vijay Benedict, Shailendra Singh
1988	Commando	"Commando Commando"	Bappi Lahiri	Anjaan	Vijay Benedict
1988	Commando	"Maine Maine"	Bappi Lahiri	Anjaan	Vijay Benedict
1988	Khatarnak Iraade	"Dushman Kab Dosti Ka"	Kirti Anuraag	Ram Siddharth	
1988	Maalamaal	"Kal Na Aaya Hai Na Aayega"	Anu Malik	Indeevar	
1988	Maalamaal	"Meri Raato Me"	Anu Malik	Indeevar	Anu Malik
1988	Maalamaal	"Pehla Pehla Pyar"	Anu Malik	Indeevar	Anu Malik
1988	Ustaad	"Sar Pe Kafan"	Anu Malik	Indeevar	Sapna Mukherjee, Shabbir Kumar
1988	Bungalow No. 666	"Nachenge Hum"	Anu Malik	Sameer	
1988	Taaqatwar	"Chadh Gayi"	Anu Malik	Indeevar	Amit Kumar
1988	Taaqatwar	"Aiye Aap ka Intezaar"	Anu Malik	Indeevar	Anu Malik
1988	Meri Zabaan	"Yeh Bhi Mujhe Chahe baba"	Anu Malik	Anjaan	Anu Malik
1988	Mulzim	"Kase Raho Mujhe"	Bappi Lahiri	Indeevar	Mohd Aziz
1988	Shiv Shakti	"Dekh Le Zara"	Anand–Milind	Sameer	
1988	Waqt Ki Awaz	"Pyaar Chahiye"	Bappi Lahiri	Anjaan	Sudesh Bhosle
1988	Hum Intezaar Karenge	"Ma Maiya"	Bappi Lahiri	Anjaan	Vijay Benedict
1988	Hum Bhi Insaan Hain	"Baadal Hain Barsaate Hain"	Bappi Lahiri	Anjaan	Amit Kumar
1988	Guru	"Bad Girl"	Bappi Lahiri	Anjaan	Shailendra Singh
1988	Garibon Ka Daata	"Ek Do Teen Char"	Bappi Lahiri	Anand Bakshi	Sudesh Bhosle
1988	Farz Ki Jung	"We Are a New Genewration"	Bappi Lahiri	Anjaan	Vijay Benedict
1988	Sachché Ká Bol-Bálá	"Sheeshe Ki Gudiya"	Bappi Lahiri	Amit Khanna	
1988	Paanch Paapi	"Aage Chor Peeche Chor"		Anjaan	Mohammed Aziz
1988	Hisaab Khoon Ka	"Chand Se Aaya Hoon Dance Karne"	Nadeem-Shravan	Hasrat Jaipuri	Vijay Benedict
1988	Ram Lakhan	"Main Hoon Hero"	Laxmikant-Pyarelal	Anand Bakshi	Mohammed Aziz, Amit Kumar
1989	Aakhri Ghulam	"Dil Ki Kitaab Hoon"	Bappi Lahiri	Anjaan	
1989	Gair Kanooni	"Tik Tik Tik"	Bappi Lahiri	Indeevar	Bappi Lahiri
1989	Hathyar	"Jalwa Dekhoge Kya Ji"	Laxmikant–Pyarelal	Hasan Kamal	
1989	Ghar Ka Chiraag	"Dil Lene Aaya Hoon"	Bappi Lahiri	Anjaan	Shabbir Kumar
1989	Kasam Vardi Ki	"Anchan Anchan Kare"	Bappi Lahiri	Anjaan	
1989	Khoj	"Sooni Sooni Raaten Hai"	Bappi Lahiri	Anjaan	
1989	Ladaai	"Har Mard Ki Teen Kamzori"	Anu Malik	Hasrat Jaipuri	
1989	Ladaai	"Love Love Love"	Anu Malik	Anjaan	
1989	Ladaai	"Mera Naam Billo"	Anu Malik	Anjaan	
1989	Lashkar	"Piye Jaa Pilaye Jaa"	Nadeem-Shravan	Anwar Sagar	
1989	Love Love Love	"Disco Dandia"	Bappi Lahiri	Anjaan	Vijay Benedict
1989	Mahal	"Dil Mera Laage"	Bappi Lahiri		
1989	Na-Insaafi	"Main Hoon Babusha"	Bappi Lahiri	Anjaan	Sudesh Bhosle, Mohd Aziz
1989	Na-Insaafi	"Bombai Ki Kasam"	Bappi Lahiri	Anjaan	
1989	Sikka	"Tu Husn Ka Sarkaar"	Bappi Lahiri	Indeevar	Sudesh Bhosle
1989	Tridev	"Raat Bhar Jaam Se"	Kalyanji Anandji	Anand Bakshi	
1989	C.I.D	"Pyaas Dil Ki Bujha Do"	Kalyanji Anandji	Anjaan	
1989	Zakham	"Mummy Mummy"	Bappi Lahiri	Anjaan	Amit Kumar
1989	Shandaar	"Ek Main Hu"	Bappi Lahiri	Anjaan	Kishore Kumar
1989	Maha-Sangram	"Dhak Dhak Dhak"	Anand–Milind	Sameer	Aditya Pancholi

=== 1990s ===
Year	Film	Song	Composer(s)	Writer(s)	Co-artist(s)
1990	Agneekaal	"Dil Ka Vote"	Pankaj Bhatt	Shyam Raj	Sadashiv Amrapurkar
1990	Bandh Darwaza	"Jalta Hai Kyun Tu"	Anand–Milind	Kafeel Azar	
1990	Haar Jeet	"Aaj Kal Ka Pyaar Bhi"	Bappi Lahiri	Indeevar	
1990	Kali Ganga	"Chhuo Na"	Bappi Lahiri	Anjaan	Shailendra Singh
1990	Khatarnaak	"Chori Chori Aaya Tu"	Anu Malik	Indeevar	
1990	Madam X	"Madam X"	Anu Malik	Sameer	
1990	Sher Dil	"Door Shehar Se"	Laxmikant-Pyarelal	Anand Bakshi	
1991	Kohraam	"Adi Tappa"	Bappi Lahiri	Anjaan	Bappi Lahiri
1991	Meena Bazaar	"Aaj To Jnemaan"	Naresh Sharma	Sameer	
1991	Parakrami (Unreleased)	"O Janiya"	Laxmikant-Pyarelal		Amit Kumar
1991	Pathar Ke Insan	"Chhod Chala"	Bappi Lahiri	Indeevar	
1991	Phool Aur Kaante	"I Love You"	Nadeem Shravan	Sameer	Udit Narayan
1991	Pyaar Ka Saaya	"Har Ghadi Mere Pyaar Ka Saaya"	Nadeem Shravan	Sameer	Kumar Sanu
1991	Pyaar Ka Saaya	"Aaja Aaja"	Nadeem Shravan	Sameer	Kumar Sanu
1991	Krishan Avtaar	"Phirse Armaan Jaag Uthe"	Nadeem Shravan	Sameer	
1991	Ye Hai Ghar Ka Mahabharat	"Time Karlo Pyaar Ka Fix"	Rajesh Roshan	Anwar Sagar	Mohd Aziz
1991	Umar 55 Ki Dil Bachpan Ka	"Ankhon Mein Tere Sapne Hai"	Dilip Sen-Sameer Sen	Yogesh	Sudesh Bhonsle
1992	Balwaan	"Jalta Hai Badan:"	Kishore - Mahesh Sharma	Anwar Sagar	
1992	Khiladi	"Tu Shama Hai"	Jatin–Lalit	Dev Kohli	Abhijeet
1992	Panaah	"Reshmi Zulfen"	Nadeem - Shravan	Vishweshwar Sharma	
1992	Kaise Kaise Rishte	"Bhiga Hain Mausam"	Nadeem - Shravan	Sameer	Kumar Sanu
1993	Chandra Mukhi	"Chha Raha Hai"	Anand–Milind	Sameer	Kumar Sanu
1993	Dhartiputra	"Mausam Rangila Hai"	Nadeem-Shravan	Sameer	Kumar Sanu
1993	Hum Hain Kamaal Ke	"Kaise Mujhe Chhua"	Naresh Sharma	Rani Malik	
1993	Muqabla	"Tumbak Tu Baba"	Dilip Sen-Sameer Sen	Nawab Aarzoo	
1993	Khuddar	"Sexy Sexy Mujjhe"	Anu Malik	Indeevar	Anu Malik
1993	Jazbaat	"Har Kisiko	Raamlaxman	Ravinder Rawal	
1994	Chauraha	"Lal Lal Tere Gaal"	Laxmikant-Pyarelal	Anand Bakshi	
1994	Hum Hain Bemisaal	"Qaatil Akhonwale"	Anu Malik		
1994	Hum Hain Bemisaal	"Duma Dum Mast Qalandar"	Anu Malik		Baba Sehgal
1994	Hum Hain Bemisaal	"Chori Chori"	Anu Malik		Anu Malik
1994	Main Khiladi Tu Anari	"My adorable Darling"	Anu Malik	Rani Malik	Anu Malik
1994	Mohini	"Hi Handsome"			Udit Narayan
1994	Naaraaz	"Roza Roza"	Anu Malik	Dev Kohli	
1994	Pathreela Raasta	"Sholon Mein"	Raamlaxman	Anamika	Sudesh Bhosle
1994	Raat Ke Gunaah	"Main Rubi Rubi"	Anand–Milind		
1994	The Gentleman	"What is Love"	Anu Malik	Indeevar	Anu Malik
1994	Vijaypath	"Ruk Ruk Ruk Arre Baba Ruk"	Anu Malik	Shyam Anuragi	
1994	Vijaypath	"Kal Saiya Ne Aisi Bowling Ki"	Anu Malik	Anwar Sagar	
1994	Zaalim	"Bombay Se Rail Chali"	Anu Malik	Sikandar Bharati	Anu Malik
1994	The Gambler	Äkeli Main Aayi"	Anu Malik	Anwar Saagar	
1994	Surakshaa	"O Mere Sanam"	Anu Malik	Faiaz Anwar	Abhijeet, Udit Narayan
1994	Miss 420	"O Baba Kiss Me"	Anu Malik	Indeevar	Ravindra Sathe
1994	Miss 420	"Ha Kah De Ya Na"	Anu Malik	Dev Kohli	Baba Sehgal
1994	Paandav	"Trailer O Trailer"	Jatin–Lalit		
1994	Papi Gudia	"Dekho Dekho Main Hoon Karishma"	Naresh Sharma		Bali Brahmbhatt
1995	Criminal	"Mujhko Chhupa Le"	M. M. Keeravani	Indeevar	Kumar Sanu
1995	Gunda Mawaali	"Aaj Kisi Se Na"	Jatin–Lalit	Zameer Kazmi	Raju Verma
1995	Gundaraj	"Ek Nigah Mein"	Anu Malik	Zafar Gorakhpuri	Kumar Sanu
1995	Gundaraj	"I Love You"	Anu Malik	Zafar Gorakhpuri	Kumar Sanu
1995	Gundaraj	"Bad Boys"	Anu Malik	Shyam Anuragi	Bali Brahmabhatt
1995	Haatkhadi	"Lml Bab Lml"	Anu Malik		Anu Malik
1995	Sabse Bada Khiladi	"Lovers"	Rajesh Roshan	Dev kohli	
1995	Takkar	"Love Is Mad"	Anu Malik		
1995	Beqabu	"Lenga Lenga Lenga"	Anu Malik		Remo Fernandes
1995	Teenmoti	"Garam Hai Loha"	Dilip Sen-Sameer Sen		Nawab Arzoo
1995	Tu Chor Main Sipahi	"Yeh Aag Thi Dil Mein"	Dilip Sen-Sameer Sen	Anand Bakshi	
1995	Zamaana Deewana	"Parody"	Nadeem-Shravan	Sameer	Bali Brahmabhatt
1995	Bambai Ka Babu	"Ure Baba Ure Baba"	Anand–Milind	Sameer	
1995	Vishwasghaat	"Hoga Hoga"	Shyam-Surendar	Rani Malik	
1995	Jeeo Shaan Se	"Thoda Pyaar Thoda Taqraar"	Shyam-Surendar	Nawab Arzoo	Vinod Rathore
1995	Phool Bane Patthar	Chhuo Na Tum Mujhko Aise"	Shyam-Surendar		Bali Brahmbhatt
1995	Yash	Yeh Kya Hua"	Tabun Sutradhar		Kumar Sanu
1996	Apne Dam Par	"Teri Meri Aankh Ladi, Pyar Ki Masti Chadi"	Aadesh Shrivastava	Anwar Sagar	
1996	Hum Hain Premi	"Hai Dilruba Mera Naam"	Shyam-Surendar	Sateesh	
1996	Raja Hindustani	"Tere Ishq Mein Nachenge"	Nadeem Shravan	Sameer	Kumar Sanu, Sapna Mukherjee
1996	Insaaf	"Krishna Krishna"	Anand–Milind	Sameer	
1997	Aflatoon	"Gori Chori Chori"	Dilip Sen-Sameer Sen	Anand Bakshi	
1997	Dhaal	"Chhuo Na Chhuo Na"	Anu Malik	Dev Kohli	
1998	Keemat	"De Diya Dil Pyiya"	Rajesh Roshan	Sameer	Sonu Nigam
1999	Lohpurush	"Bandh Kamre Mein Ek Ladka Ho"	Dilip Sen-Sameer Sen		Kumar Sanu
1999	Nyaydaata	"Bheegi Bheegi Hai Hawa"	Shyam Surendar		Sonu Nigan
1999	Thakshak	Jumbalika	A. R. Rahman	Mehboob	Shankar Mahadevan

=== 2000s ===
Year	Film	Song	Composer(s)	Writer(s)	Co-artist(s)
2000	Karobaar: The Business of Love	"Moujo Mein Ae Sanam"	Rajesh Roshan	Rahul Jha	
2001	Pyaar Tune Kya Kiya	Roundhe (I)	Sandeep Chowta	Nitin Raikwar	
2002	Bollywood/Hollywood	Rang Rang	Sandeep Chowta	Ajay Virmani	Sonu Nigam
2002	Bollywood/Hollywood	"Sona Sona Roop Hai"	Sandeep Chowta	Taabish Romani	Sonu Nigam
2002	Hathyar	Nazar Nazar Mein(Remix)		Pravin Bhardwaj	Mohammed Salamat
2002	Inth Ka Jawaab Patthar	"Bollywood Ki Baby"	Raam Laxman	Shaheen Iqbal	
2002	Mujhse Dosti Karoge	"Oh My Darling I Love U"	Rahul Sharma	Anand Bakshi	Sonu Nigam
2002	Namaste - Say Hello To... Love	"Kya Main Tum Se"	Sanjeev S	Dev Kohli	
2002	Namaste - Say Hello To... Love	"We Will Be Together"	Sanjeev S	Dev Kohli	
2002	Namaste - Say Hello To... Love	"There's Something About You"	Sanjeev S	Dev Kohli	
2003	Aapko Pehle Bhi Kahin Dekha Hai	"Ishq To Jadoo Hai"	Nikhil-Vinay	Sameer	Sonu Nigam
2003	Aapko Pehle Bhi Kahin Dekha Hai	"Dil Gaya Kaam Se"	Nikhil-Vinay	Sameer	
2003	Ishq Vishk	"Kaun Hai Woh"	Anu Malik	Sameer	Udit Narayan
2003	Ishq Vishk	"Chot Dil De Lagi"	Anu Malik	Sameer	Kumar Sanu
2003	Ishq Vishk	"Mujhpe Har Haseena"	Anu Malik	Sameer	Kumar Sanu, Sonu Nigam
2003	Ishq Vishk	Theme Piece	Anu Malik	Sameer	Sonu Nigam
2003	Shart - The Challenge	"Dil Tera Badmaash"	Anu Malik	Sameer	Sonu Nigam
2003	Qayamat: City Under Threat	"Yaar Pyaar Ho Gaya"	Nadeem-Shravan	Sameer	Abhijeet Bhattacharya
2003	Plan	Pyar Aya	Anand Raj Anand	Dev Kohli	Anand Raj Anand
2003	Plan	"Mehboob Mere"	Anand Raj Anand	Dev Kohli	
2003	Valentine Days	"Passion"	Jayanta Pathak		
2004	Bardaasht	"Na Na Na Na Re"	Himesh Reshammiya	Sameer	Kunal Ganjawala
2004	Dil Ne Jise Apna Kahaa	"Go Balle Balle"	Himesh Reshammiya	Sameer	KK, Jayesh
2004	Dobara	"Humnasheen"	Anu Malik	Javed Akhtar	Anu Malik
2004	Fida	"Maine Jisko Chaha Mil Gaya"	Anu Malik	Sameer	Sonu Nigam
2004	Murder	"Dil Ko Hazar Bar"	Anu Malik	Rahat Indori	
2004	Chehraa	"Tabahi Tabahi"	Anu Malik	Dev Kohli	
2004	Shikaar	"Nazron Se Nazron Ko"	Anand Raj Anand	Dev Kohli	
2005	Bachke Rehna Re Baba	"Sharafat Chhod De"	Anu Malik	Farhaad	
2005	Barsaat	Haath Utha Ke Jara Gol Ghum Ja (Nakhre)	Nadeem Shravan	Sameer	Ishq Bector
2005	Bunty Aur Babli	Kajra Re	Shankar–Ehsaan–Loy	Gulzar	Shankar Mahadevan, Javed Ali
2005	Fareb	"Subah Bhi Beqaraar Hain"	Anu Malik	Sayeed Quadri	
2005	Kalyug	"Dheera Dheere"	Anu Malik	Sayeed Quadri	
2005	Karam	"Tinka Tinka Jara Jara"	Anu Malik	Vishal–Shekhar	
2005	No Entry	No Entry / Ishq Ki Galli Mein	Anu Malik	Sameer	Sonu Nigam
2005	No Entry	"Ishq Mein"	Anu Malik	Sameer	K.K.
2005	No Entry	"Why Why / Dil Chura Ke"	Anu Malik	Sameer	
2005	No Entry	"Hot Hot / Kalyug Ki Laila"	Anu Malik	Sameer	Sunidhi Chauhan, Vasundhara Das
2005	No Entry	"Mera Jaisa Koi Nahin"	Anu Malik	Sameer	Sunidhi Chauhan
2005	Ramji Londonwaley	"Do Do Do Do"	Vishal Bhardwaj	Sayeed Quadri	Suresh Wadkar
2005	Silsiilay	"Tere Liye Mere"	Himesh Reshammiya		Jolly Mukherjee, Jayesh Gandhi
2006	App Ki Khatir	I Love You For What You Are	Himesh Reshammiya	Sameer	KK, Kunal Ganjawala
2006	Apna Sapna Money Money	Gustakh Nigah	Himesh Reshammiya	Pritam Chakraborty	Shabbir Ahmed, Sukhwinder Singh
2006	Corporate (2006 film)	Yahan Sab Ko Sab Corporate	Shamir Tandon		Garry Lawyer
2006	Dhoom 2	"Touch Me"	Pritam Chakraborty	Sameer	KK
2006	Dil Diya Hai	"Jabse Aankh Ladi"	Himesh Reshammiya		Jayesh Gandhi
2006	Don: The Chase Begin Again	Aaj Ki Raat	Shankar-Ehsaan-Loy	Javed Akhtar	Mahalakshmi Iyer, Sonu Nigam
2006	Krishna	Aayo Nathkhat Nandlala	Bapi-Tutul		Anupam Amod, Carol
2006	Mere Jeevan Saathi	"Mashooqa"	Nadeem Shravan		Shaan
2006	Naksha	"Nasha"	Pritam Chakraborty		Pritam Chakraborty
2006	Pyar Ke Side Effects	"Allah Bachaye"	Pritam Chakraborty	Mayur Puri	Earl Edgar, Suzanne D'Mello
2006	Pyar Ke Side Effects	"Bad Boys (remix)"	Pritam Chakraborty	Mayur Puri	Earl Edgar, Suzanne D'Mello
2006	The Killer	"Abhi Toh Main Jawaan Hoon"	Sajid–Wajid		
2006	Rehguzar	"Habibi Habibi"	Aadesh Shrivastava		Aadesh Shrivastava
2007	Ek Chalis Ki Last Local	"Ekka Chuaka"	Sandesh Shandilya	Mehboob	Sandesh Shandilya
2007	Ek Chalis Ki Last Local	"Ekka Chuaka (Film Version)"	Sandesh Shandilya	Mehboob	Sandesh Shandilya
2007	Ek Chalis Ki Last Local	"Panga"	Sandesh Shandilya	Mehboob	Sonu Nigam
2007	Jhoom Barabar Jhoom	Ticket to Hollywood	Shankar–Ehsaan–Loy		Neeraj Shridhar
2007	Kya Love Story Hai	It's Rocking yara kabhi ishq to karo	Pritam Chakraborty		
2007	Mumbai Salsa	"Mumbai Salsa (duet)"	Adnan Sami		Adnan Sami
2007	Mumbai Salsa	"Mumbai Salsa (female)"	Adnan Sami		
2007	Namastey London	"Dilruba"	Himesh Reshammiya	Javed Akhtar	Zubeen Garg
2007	Namastey London	"Dilruba (remix)"	Himesh Reshammiya		Zubeen Garg
2007	Naqaab	"Aa Dil Se Dil Mila Le"	Pritam Chakraborty	Sameer	Krishna
2007	Naqaab	"Aa Dil Se Dil Mila Le (Remix)"	Pritam Chakraborty	Sameer	Krishna
2007	Parveen Bobby	"Chhore Chhore Pade Hain Peechhe"	Dilip Sen-Sameer Sen		
2007	Raqeeb	"Qatil"	Pritam Chakraborty	Sameer	
2008	Love Story 2050	"Lover Boy"	Anu Malik		
2008	Mere Baap Pehle Aap	"Ishq Subhan Allah"	Tauseef Akhtar	Sameer	Neeraj Shridhar
2008	Mere Baap Pehle Aap	"Ishq Subhan Allah (remix)"	Tauseef Akhtar	Sameer	Neeraj Shridhar
2008	Rama Rama Kya Hai Dramaa?	"Khwabaon Se Nikal Ke"			
2009	Ajab Prem Ki Ghazab Kahani	"Tera Hone Laga Hoon"	Pritam Chakraborty		Atif Aslam
2009	All The Best	"You Are My Love"			Kunal Ganjawala, Rajesh, Antra Mali, Neeraj Shridhar
2009	Dil Bole Hadippa	"Bhangra Bistar Beer"	Pritam Chakraborty		Sunidhi Chauhan, Hard Kaur
2009	Kal Kissne Dekha	"Jashn Hai Josh Hai"	Sajid–Wajid		Neeraj Shridhar, Wajid
2009	Kambakkht Ishq	"Bebo Main Bebo"	Anu Malik		
2009	Love Khichdi	"Jazeeren"			
2009	Marega Salaa	"Parde Walibaat"	Dabbu Malik		
2009	Marega Salaa	"Parde Walibaat"(Remix version)	Dabbu Malik		

=== 2010s ===
Year	Film	Song	Composer(s)	Writer(s)	Co-artist(s)
2010	Prince	"Jiyara Jiyara"	Sachin Gupta	Sameer	Hard Kaur
2010	Prince	"Jiyara Jiyara" (Bhangra Remix)	Sachin Gupta	Sameer	Hard Kaur
2010	Prince	"Prince Theme" (Mega Mix)	Sachin Gupta	Sameer	Shreya Ghoshal, Hard Kaur, Atif Aslam
2010	Toonpur Ka Superhero	"Baliye Baliye"	Anu Malik	Mumzy	Hard Kaur, Shaan, Anu Malik
2010	Toonpur Ka Superhero	"Naach Mere Naal"	Anu Malik	Mumzy	Master Saleem, Mumzy
2010	Ek Second... Jo Zindagi Badal De?	"Roza Roza"	Anand Raj Anand		Anand Raj Anand
2012	Yeh Jo Mohabbat Hai	"Angel My Angel"	Anu Malik		Sonu Nigam
2013	Krrish 3	"Dil Tu Hi Bata"	Rajesh Roshan	Sameer	Zubeen Garg
2013	Krrish 3	"Dil Tu Hi Bata (Remix By DJ Shiva)"	Rajesh Roshan	Sameer	Zubeen Garg
2013	Krrish 3	"You are My Love"	Rajesh Roshan	Sameer	Mohit Chauhan
2017	Daddy	"Zinadgi Meri Dance Dance"	Sajid–Wajid		Vijay Benedict

== Regional songs ==
Year	Language	Film/Album	Song	Composer(s)	Writer(s)	Co-artist(s)
1985	Konkani	Old Goan Gold / Trikaal	Panch Vorsam	Remo Fernandes		Remo Fernandes
1985	Konkani	Old Goan Gold / Trikaal	Rajan and Prema	Remo Fernandes		Remo Fernandes
1987	Malayalam	Kalpana House	Jawaan Dil Hain"	Anu Malik		Anu Malik
1987	Telugu	Chinnu Krishnudu	"O Gali Vanalo"	R D Burman	Veturi	S P Balasubrahmanyam
1988	Bengali	Debibaran	"Gaayega Gaayega Zamana"	Bappi Lahiri	Shivkumar Saroj	
1988	Telugu	Raktha Tilakam	Guppedu Mallelu"	K. Chakravarthy	Jonnavithhula Ramalingeswara Rao	Mano
1988	Telugu	Raktha Tilakam	"Kill Kill Me"	K. Chakravarthy	Jaladhi	
1989	Bengali	Amar Shapath	"Aami Break Dancer"			solo
1989	Kannada	Idu Saadhya	"Kanninalle Nee Kollabeda"	Vijayanand	R. N. Jayagopal	K. S. Chithra
1990	Telugu	Prema Yuddham	"Deewana Mastana"	Hamsalekha	Aatreya	S. P. Balasubrahmanyam, Sudesh Bhosle
2004	Bengali	Kuasha	"Dure Dure Keno"	Babul Bose	Shyamal Sengupta	Swapan Mukherjee
2007	Kannada	Hudugaata	Ommomme Heego	Jassie Gift		Zubeen Garg
2008	Punjabi	Yaariyan	"Cmon Cmon"			Sonu Nigam
2014	Punjabi	Yaaran Da Katchup	Nede Nede (Female)	Gurnazar		
