= Wanted: Dead or Alive (1984 film) =

1984 film

Wanted
- DVD Cover
- Directed by: Ambrish Sangal
- Written by: Nusrat Sayyed (screenplay); V K Sharma (dialogues)
- Story by: Aruna Sangal
- Produced by: Shyam Sunder Shivdasani
- Starring: Shammi Kapoor; Mithun Chakraborty; Tina Munim
- Cinematography: Pramod Mittal
- Edited by: Kamlakar Karkhanis
- Music by: Bappi Lahiri
- Release date: 6 January 1984
- Running time: 147 min.
- Country: India
- Language: Hindi

Wanted is a 1984 Indian Hindi-language action-adventure film directed by Ambrish Sangal, starring Shammi Kapoor, Mithun Chakraborty, Tina Munim in pivotal roles. The film is made in the style of a spaghetti Western.

== Plot ==
An honest forest officer, Vikram, is in love with Angela, and soon both get married. Their marriage and bliss are shattered when dacait Kehar Singh kills Angela. When Vikram sets out to avenge her death, he himself is framed and sentenced to prison. When he completes his sentence, he comes out only to be a suspect again, this time in the eyes of Neeta, who thinks he killed her dad and Bheem Singh a big tough mysterious man.

== Cast ==
- Shammi Kapoor as Bheem Singh
- Mithun Chakraborty as Vikram
- Tina Munim as Neeta
- Om Shivpuri as Kehar Singh
- Mazhar Khan as Nathiya
- Mac Mohan as Kehar Singh's Henchman
- Krishan Dhawan as Neeta's Father
- Asrani as Albert
- Deepti Naval as Angela

== Music ==
The music was composed by Bappi Lahiri, with lyrics by Anjaan. The soundtrack album was released in 1983. The electronic dance song "Koi Lutera" sung by Asha Bhosle is considered a precursor to acid house, with a tweaked Roland TB-303 bassline, drum machine beats and sound effect samples. The song was influenced by Charanjit Singh's Synthesizing: Ten Ragas to a Disco Beat (1982).

Song	Singer
"Tumsa Nahin Dekha"	Kishore Kumar
"Tu Hai Deewana, Tu Nahin Mana Mere Yaar"	Kishore Kumar, Asha Bhosle
"Koi Lutera Dil Leke"	Asha Bhosle
"Raat Aaye, Raat Jaye, Raaton Ki Rani Main"	Asha Bhosle, Bappi Lahiri
"Rahi Hoon Main"	Bappi Lahiri
