= Divine Lovers =

1997 Bollywood film directed by Babbar Subhash

- Directed by: Babbar Subhash
- Starring: Hemant Birje; Maxwell Caulfield; Shannon McLeod
- Music by: Bappi Lahiri
- Production company: B.Subhash Films
- Release date: 1997
- Running time: 135 minutes
- Country: India
- Language: English

Divine Lovers is a 1997 Bollywood film directed by Babbar Subhash. The film's cast includes Maxwell Caulfield, Hemant Birje, and Shannon McLeod.

== Plot ==
The story is about lovers from previous lives meeting in India. The narrative unfolds with a young village girl, Urvashi, and a man named Chandra, captured by a local sculptor, Gregory. Forced to pose in compromising positions, they fall in love, but tragedy strikes when Chandra is fatally injured by Gregory. In the modern era of the 1990s, in India, a local prince marries Reeta, a girl revealed to be Urvashi's reincarnation. Simultaneously, Jeff, an architect in the US and Chandra's reincarnation, experiences nightmares of a sculptor's threat.

Jeff visits India for an archaeological site trip, discovering the same cave where the tragic events unfolded in their past lives. Unaware of their shared history, Jeff and Reeta bond, and they eventually realize their past connection. The narrative takes a dramatic turn as the prince, embodying the sculptor's essence, poses a threat. In a climactic confrontation, the prince is defeated, leading to the lovers' reunion.

Tragically, an earthquake seals the cave entrance, trapping the lovers inside. Accepting their fate, they express the enduring nature of their love, reminiscent of Chandra and Urvashi. The film concludes with the implication that their love transcends lifetimes.

== Production and Cast ==
Directed by Babbar Subhash, "Divine Lovers" features a notable cast, including Maxwell Caulfield as Jeff Thompson, Shannon McLeod as Reeta/Urvashi, Marc Zuber as Prince Kabir, Kim Sill as Gisela, Richard Lynch as Gregory, Hemant Birje as Chandra, and others.

== Reception ==
While the film's plot centers on reincarnation and enduring love, critical reception and audience feedback can provide valuable insights into its impact and cultural significance.

== Legacy ==
Explore any lasting impact the film may have had on Bollywood or within the context of its release, considering factors like box office performance, awards, or cultural influence.

== Cast ==
- Maxwell Caulfield as Jeff Thompson
- Shannon McLeod as Reeta / Urvashi
- Marc Zuber as Prince Kabir
- Kim Sill as Gisela (as Kimberly Dawson)
- Richard Lynch as Gregory
- Hemant Birje as Chandra
- Tom Alter as Dr. Taubman
- Girja Shankar as Dr. Pran
- Anil Nagrath as Heinz
- Viju Khote as Mukerjee
