= Zamaane Ko Dikhana Hai =

1981 Hindi film

- Directed by: Nasir Hussain
- Written by: Sachin Bhowmick
- Produced by: Nasir Hussain
- Starring: Rishi Kapoor; Padmini Kolhapure
- Cinematography: Munir Khan
- Edited by: Zafar Sultan
- Music by: R. D. Burman
- Release date: 5 February 1982
- Country: India
- Language: Hindi

Zamaane Ko Dikhana Hai (translation: Show The World) is a 1982 Indian Hindi-language romantic action thriller film produced and directed by Nasir Hussain. The film stars Rishi Kapoor, Padmini Kolhapure, Yogeeta Bali, Amjad Khan, Kader Khan, Shreeram Lagoo in pivotal roles. The film flopped and Hussain blamed the arrival of video in the early 1980s for the film's failure and that it deserved a better fate.

== Plot ==
Wealthy industrialist, Nanda, is enraged when he finds out that his eldest son, Ramesh, has fallen in love with a poor woman, Seema, and wants to marry her. He asks his son that if he marries her, he will exclude him from his will. In answer to that, Ramesh marries Seema and leaves the Nanda household. When Nanda's younger son, Ravi, returns home, he is told that his brother is away on business. Ravi does find out that Ramesh had been asked to leave by their father. He manages to convince his dad to change his mind about Ramesh, and sets off to find Ramesh. He finds out that Ramesh and Seema are no longer alive, but Seema had given birth to a son, and left him in the care of her sister, Kanchan. Ravi meets Kanchan, and both fall in love with each other. When Kanchan finds out that Ravi is Nanda's son, she is angry, and refuses to have to do anything with Ravi, as she is sure that she too will be rejected by Nanda, when he finds out that she is poor, and related to Seema. What Ravi and Kanchan don't know that Nanda has an ulterior motive, as he wants to adopt Ramesh's son - by hook or by crook.

== Cast ==
- Rishi Kapoor as Ravi Nanda
- Padmini Kolhapure as Kanchan / Bahadur
- Yogeeta Bali as Razia Khan
- Amjad Khan as Shareef Khan / Sharafat Ali / Karamat Ali / Salamat Ali / Wajahat Ali
- Kader Khan as Shekhar Nanda
- Om Shivpuri as Colonel I. M. Tipsee
- Simple Kapadia as Kanchan Tipsee
- Shreeram Lagoo as S. K. Nanda
- Neelam Mehra as Kavita
- Viju Khote as Ranjeet
- Tariq Khan as Robin Nanda
- Randhir Kapoor as Ramesh Nanda (Special Appearance)
- Jeetendra as Kanchan Tipse's boyfriend (Special appearance)
- Aarti Gupta Surendranath as Bulbul (Special Appearance)

== Soundtrack ==
The soundtrack was released in 1981. The music was composed by Rahul Dev Burman, also known as R.D. Burman, with lyrics by Majrooh Sultanpuri. The track "Hoga Tumse Pyara Kaun" is tuned in Raag Durga (comparable to Shuddha Saveri or Arabhi of Carnatic music)

=== Track list ===
Song	Singer
"Dil Lena Khel Hai Dildar Ka"	R. D. Burman
"Hoga Tumse Pyara Kaun"	Shailendra Singh
"Poochho Na Yaar Kya Hua" (Solo)	Mohammed Rafi
"Poochho Na Yaar Kya Hua" (Duet)	Asha Bhosle, Mohammed Rafi, Padmini Kolhapure, Rishi Kapoor
"Pari Ho Aasmani Tum"	Asha Bhosle, Shailendra Singh, Rishi Kapoor
"Main Hoon Woh Albela"	Asha Bhosle, Manna Dey
"Bolo Bolo, Kuch To Bolo"	Asha Bhosle, Mohammed Rafi
"Joy of Living"	Joe Alvares

=== Notable songs ===
R.D. Burman – "Dil Lena Khel Hai Dildar Ka" (1981)
Sample of R.D. Burman's "Dil Lena Khel Hai Dildar Ka" (1981)

In recent years, the soundtrack has received attention for "Dil Lena Khel Hai Dildar Ka," a synthesized, minimalist, electronic dance/disco song. It has been described as having "a very futuristic electro feel" and approaching a "techno wavelength." The song has been cited as a possible influence on the 1982 proto-acid house album Synthesizing: Ten Ragas to a Disco Beat by Charanjit Singh.
