= Surya (2023 film) =

Indian action drama film

- Theatrical release poster
- Directed by: Hasnain Hyderabadwala
- Screenplay by: Vijay Kadam; Mangesh Thange; Mangesh Kedar; Hemant Edalabadkar
- Story by: Mangesh Thange
- Produced by: Reshma Mangesh Thange; Rajendra Thakare; Aakash Goel
- Starring: Prasad Mangesh; Ruchita Jadhav; Akhilendra Mishra; Hemant Birje; Uday Tikekar; Pradeep Patwardhan; Arun Nalawade
- Cinematography: Madhu S Rao
- Edited by: Rahul Bhatanka
- Music by: Dev Chouhan
- Production company: SP Motion Pictures
- Distributed by: AA Films
- Release date: 6 January 2023
- Country: India
- Language: Marathi

Surya is a 2023 Indian Marathi-language action drama film directed by Hasnain Hyderabadwala and produced by SP Motion Pictures. Surya was released in theaters on 6 January 2023. Hemant Birje of 1985 Hindi Adventures of Tarzan fame made his Marathi film debut with this film.

== Plot ==
Champak tries to pull off a crooked scheme with the help of Mumbai don Razak Bhai and his accomplices. But Surya's entire family dies trying to oppose them.

== Cast ==
- Prasad Mangesh as Surya
- Ruchita Jadhav
- Akhilendra Mishra
- Hemant Birje
- Prasad Mangesh
- Pankaj Vishnu
- Uday Tikekar
- Arun Nalawade
- Ganesh Yadav
- Pradeep Patwardhan
- Sanjivani Jadhav
- Raghuvendra Kadkol
- Deepjyoti Naik
- Hary Josh
- Pratap Borhade
- Amjad Qureshi

== Soundtrack ==
Surya

Soundtrack album by Dev Chouhan
- Released: 21 December 2022
- Genre: Feature film soundtrack
- Length: 23:58
- Language: Marathi
- Label: Zee Music Company

Official audio
- Surya - Full Album on YouTube

Music is composed by Dev Chouhan and lyrics to the songs is given by Baba Chouhan, Santosh Darekar, Santosh Mishra, Dev Chouhan. Songs are recorded by Sukhwinder Singh, Raja Hasan, Adarsh Shinde, Mamta Sharma, Neha Rajpal, Kavita Nikamand and Khushboo Jain.

All music is composed by Dev Chouhan.

Track listing
No.	Title	Lyrics	Singer (s)	Length
1.	"Guntata Guntata"	Baba Chavan	Raja Hasan, Neha Rajpal	4:00
2.	"Berang Jawani"	Prashant Hedaoo	Adarsh Shinde, Kavita Ram, Khushboo Jain	5:13
3.	"Mi Aahe Kolhapurchi"	Sanjay Mishra	Khushboo Jain, Dev Chouhan	4:34
4.	"Rapchik Kolinbai"	Santosh Darekar, Mangesh Thange, Dev Chouhan	Mamta Sharma, Dev Chouhan	4:48
5.	"Suryaa Suryaa"	Baba Chavan	Sukhwinder Singh	4:43
Total length:				23:58

== Release ==
The film was theatrically released on 6 January 2023.

== Reception ==
Anub George of The Times of India rated the film 1.5 out of 5, finding fault with the simplistic plot, stereotyped characters and acting.
