= Synthesizing: Ten Ragas to a Disco Beat =

Studio album by Charanjit Singh
- Released: 1982; 2010 (re-issue)
- Recorded: 1982
- Genres: Electro-disco acid house
- Labels: Gramophone Company of India/Saregama, Bombay Connection (2010 reissue)
- Producer: Charanjit Singh

Charanjit Singh chronology
Charanjit Singh: Plays Hit Tunes on Synthesizer of Silsila (1981)	Synthesizing: Ten Ragas to a Disco Beat (1982)	Experiments in Calypso

Synthesizing: Ten Ragas to a Disco Beat is the debut studio album by Indian musician Charanjit Singh. It was released in 1982 through the Gramophone Company of India, now known as Saregama. The album primarily utilizes the Roland TR-808 drum machine and Roland TB-303 bass synthesizer and was originally intended as a fusion of electronic disco music with Indian classical ragas.

Singh's distinctive utilization of both the TR-808 and the TB-303 on the album has led some music journalists to suggest that it is perhaps the earliest example of acid house music; predating Phuture's seminal Chicago acid house record "Acid Tracks" (1987) by five years. Because of this, Charanjit Singh is often regarded as the pioneer of acid house.

== Background ==
=== Production ===
Singh produced Ten Ragas using three electronic musical instruments made by the Roland Corporation: the Jupiter-8 synthesizer, Roland TR-808, and Roland TB-303. It was one of the first records to use the TB-303, a machine that has become synonymous with acid house. Singh had bought his TB-303 in Singapore soon after its introduction in late 1981. He didn't know much about the three machines at first, so he spent much time figuring out how to use them, and eventually discovered that it was possible to synchronise the TR-808 and TB-303 with the Jupiter-8 keyboard. According to Singh: "At home I practised with the combination and I thought 'It sounds good – why not record it'." While the TB-303 was originally designed to fill in for a bass guitar, it was awkward when it came to reproducing conventional basslines, so he found a different way to employ the machine, particularly its glissando function which made it suitable for reproducing the Indian raga melodies.

Besides Indian raga music, he also took inspiration from contemporary Bollywood music, or filmi music, specifically the Indian electronic disco scene that had only just become popular in the early 1980s (sparked by the success of Pakistani pop singer Nazia Hassan and Indian producer Biddu), at a time when disco's popularity had declined in the United States. In parallel to the Euro disco scene at the time, the continued relevance of disco in India and the increasing reliance on synthesizers led to experiments in minimalist, high-tempo, electronic disco, such as R.D. Burman's "Dil Lena Khel Hai Dildar Ka" (Zamane Ko Dikhana Hai, 1981) which had a "futuristic electro feel" and Bappi Lahari's "Yaad Aa Raha Hai" (Disco Dancer, 1982). Such developments eventually culminated in the work of Singh, who increased the tempo and made the sounds more minimalistic, while pairing them with instrumental Indian ragas using his new equipment setup.

According to Singh: "There was lots of disco music in films back in 1982. So I thought why not do something different using disco music only. I got an idea to play all the Indian ragas and give the beat a disco beat – and turn off the tabla. And I did it. And it turned out good." The first track "Raga Bhairavi" also features a synthesised voice that says "Om Namah Shivaya" through a vocoder.

== Release ==
The album was released under the label Gramophone Company of India (now Saregama), having been recorded at their His Master's Voice in Bombay in 1982. Following the LP record's release in 1982, it garnered some interest in India, finding its way onto Indian national radio, but it became a commercial failure and was largely forgotten until its 2010 re-release.

== Live performance ==
From 2012 until his death in 2015, Charanjit Singh toured internationally, performing Synthesizing: Ten Ragas to a Disco Beat for the first time. In November 2012, at age 72, he made his UK debut with stops at The Shacklewell Arms in London and La Cheetah Club in Glasgow, performing with his original Roland TB-303, TR-808, and Jupiter-8 gear.

In 2013 he embarked on a European tour, performing in cities including Aalst (Belgium), Bordeaux, Lyon, and Paris, and appeared at festivals such as Nuits Sonores (Lyon), Music Meeting (Nijmegen), and Field Day (London). He also played at Berghain in Berlin alongside A Guy Called Gerald.

== Legacy ==
Professional ratings
Review scores
Source	Rating
Pitchfork	8.6/10

Synthesizing: Ten Ragas to a Disco Beat is often considered by music journalists to be the earliest example of acid house predating Phuture's seminal Chicago acid house record "Acid Tracks" (1987) by five years. According to The Guardian writer Stuart Aitken, Singh's record was "far ahead" of its time. Electronic musician A Guy Called Gerald, who performed with Singh at the Berghain in Berlin, called him “a true pioneer — playing music from the 1980s that sounded more futuristic than what DJs were making in 2012.”

The album also played a role in popularising electronic music in Bollywood at the time. Singh influenced the Bollywood music producer Bappi Lahiri, who experimented with tweaked TB-303 basslines for several Indian disco film songs released in 1983: "Koi Lutera" in Wanted: Dead or Alive, "Aah Ha Oonh Hun" in Do Gulaab, and "Tum Tum Tumba" in Karate. A somewhat similar "techno-sounding interlude" later appeared in Lahiri's song "Kasam Paida Karne Wale Ki" from the film of the same name in 1984.

Glass Beams released a cover version of "Raga Bhairavi" called "One Raga to a Disco Beat" in 2024.

== Track listing ==
The original 1982 and 1983 LP records and the 2010 CD and LP re-releases contain the following five-minute-long tracks named after ragas:

1. "Raga Bhairavi" – 4:59
2. "Raga Lalit" – 4:55
3. "Raga Bhupali" – 4:53
4. "Raga Todi" – 4:52
5. "Raga Madhuvanti" – 4:59
6. "Raga Meghmalhar" – 5:01
7. "Raga Yaman" – 5:06
8. "Raga Kalavati" – 5:08
9. "Raga Malkauns" – 5:02
10. "Raga Bairagi" – 5:07
