= Aaj Ke Angaare =

1988 Hindi film

Aaj Ki Angaarey
- Directed by: Vinod K. Verma
- Story by: Babbar Subhash
- Produced by: Babbar Subhash
- Starring: Hemant Birje; Archana Puran Singh; Om Shivpuri; Raza Murad
- Edited by: Mangesh Chavan
- Music by: Bappi Lahiri
- Release date: 9 May 1988
- Running time: 128 minutes

Aaj Ke Angaarey is a 1988 Hindi action thriller film directed by Vinod K. Varma, starring Hemant Birje, Archana Puran Singh, Om Shivpuri and Rohini Hattangadi.

== Plot ==
A school bus was kidnapped by a group of masked men during a trip for ransom. However, the kids and their teacher managed to outsmart the kidnappers and escape from captivity.

== Cast ==
- Hemant Birje as Masked man
- Archana Puran Singh as Priya
- Neeta Puri as Sonia
- Om Shivpuri as Forest Officer Ranjit Singh
- Sarala Yeolekar as Sarparti, Ranjit Singh's wife
- Raza Murad as Police Inspector (Sonia's dad)
- Rohini Hattangadi as Sonia's mom

== Soundtrack ==
The songs were composed by Bappi Lahiri and written by Anjaan.

Track#	Title	Singer(s)
1	"Angoor Khilao Papa Ji"	Vijay Benedict, Uttara Kelkar
2	"Hum Bachche Hanste Hansate Hai"	Uttara Kelkar, Alisha Chinai
3	"Hum Hai Aaj Ke Angaare, Pyar Ke Raaste"	Alisha Chinai
4	"Jao Jao Dharti Pe Jao, Ek Baar AasmanKe Paar"	Vijay Benedict, Alisha Chinai
5	"Nacho Nacho Naag Jhumke"	Uttara Kelkar
6	"Panj Nadiya De Pani Naal"	Vijay Benedict
