= Tarzan Ki Beti =

2002 Hindi film by B. Pratap Singh

Tarzan Ki Beti is an action adventure film of Bollywood directed by B. Pratap Singh and produced by Iqbal Singh Sehra. This film was released in 2002 under the banner of Kusum Art International as a sequel of the Adventures of Tarzan. Hemant Birje portrayed Tarzan in both the films.

== Plot ==
Arjun loves an orphan girl Kiran. When they are about to be married. Kiran knows from her mother that her father is Tarzan. Kiran also has a sister, Aarti who still lives in the jungle. Some hunter tries to catch Arti in the jungle. A forest ranger helps Aarti to reunite with her family.

== Cast ==
- Hemant Birje as Renger/Tarzan
- Ritika Singh as Baby of Tarzan
- Raza Murad as Hunter
- Dhananjay Singh as Arjun
- Ali Khan
- Ray Avasthi
- Jatin Khan
- Prem Raz
- Komal Singh
- Madhu Sharma
