= Taqdeer Ka Badshah =

- DVD Cover
- Directed by: B. Subhash
- Written by: Faiz Salim
- Produced by: Ram Dayal
- Starring: Mithun Chakraborty; Ranjeeta
- Music by: Bappi Lahiri
- Release date: 3 December 1982
- Running time: 135 min.
- Country: India
- Language: Hindi

Taqdeer Ka Badshah (transl. The Kings' Destiny) is a 1982 Indian Hindi-language Indian film directed by B. Subhash, starring Mithun Chakraborty, Ranjeeta, Pran, Amjad Khan, Vijay Arora, Suresh Oberoi. The disco soundtrack was composed by Bappi Lahiri.

== Cast ==
- Mithun Chakraborty as Ratan
- Ranjeeta as Bindiya
- Pran as Shankar
- Amjad Khan as Bhola / Nath
- Vijay Arora as Anil
- Suresh Oberoi as William
- Asit Sen as College Principal
- Geeta Siddharth as Shanti
- Satyendra Kapoor as Jailor
- Vijayendra Ghatge as Inspector Prakash
- Tamanna as Neelam
- Birbal as Motu
- Jagdish Raj as Advocate

== Soundtrack ==
Lyrics: Anjaan

Song	Singer
"Bheegi Bheegi Rut Hai"	Mohammed Rafi
"Sona Chandi Heera Moti"	Mohammed Rafi
"Jo Bhaje Hari Tero Naam"	Lata Mangeshkar
"Jo Bhaje Hari" (Short)	Lata Mangeshkar
"Pyar Ka Hai Match Sanam, Wahan Ho Tum Yahan Hai Hum"	Asha Bhosle, Bappi Lahiri
"Taqdeer Ka Badshah"	Bappi Lahiri

== Reception ==
In a 2015 review of Bombay disco compilation albums, Jeffery S. McMillan described Bappi Lahiri's "Taqdeer Ka Badshah" as a "12-minute epic tour de force...Boasting everything from a gamelan-like bell sequence to muscular volleys by a brass section, 'Taqdeer' settles into a steady dance groove with Bappi again handling the singing duties in call and response with a chorus."
