= Tariq Khan (actor, born 1951) =

Indian actor

- Born: 9 November 1951 (age 74); Lucknow, Uttar Pradesh, India
- Occupation: Actor
- Years active: 1973–1995
- Relatives: See Khan–Hussain family

Tariq Khan (born 9 November 1951) is a former Indian film actor known for his works in Hindi cinema. He appeared in 16 films, including Yaadon Ki Baaraat (1973), Zakhmee (1975), and Hum Kisise Kum Naheen (1977).

== Early life ==
Khan was born in Lucknow, Uttar Pradesh, India on 9 November 1951 to Azhar Ali Khan, who married Anize Khan, the sister of Nasir Hussain. He is the paternal cousin of actors Nikhat Khan, Aamir Khan and Faisal Khan and director Mansoor Khan.

His son works in production.

== Filmography ==
=== List of films ===
- Mera Damad (1995)
- Zevar (1987)
- Paise Ke Peechhey (1986)
- Baat Ban Jaye (1986)
- Zabardast (1985)
- Manzil Manzil (1984)
- Bhool (1984)
- Pasand Apni Apni (1983)
- Bismillah Ki Barkat (1983)
- Shaukeen (1982)
- Khawaja Ki Diwani (1981)
- Zamaane Ko Dikhana Hai (1981)
- Aap Se Pyar Hua (1978)
- Hum Kisise Kum Naheen (1977)
- Zakhmee (1975)
- Yaadon Ki Baaraat (1973)

== Awards and nominations ==
=== 25th Filmfare Awards ===
- Nominated - Best Supporting Actor for Hum Kisise Kum Naheen
