= Nataša Stanković =

Serbian dancer, model, and actress (born 1992)

- Наташа Станковић
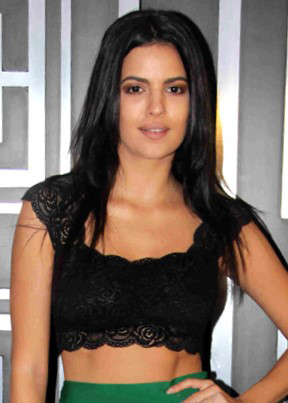
- Stanković at the screening of film Daddy in 2017
- Born: 4 March 1992 (age 34); Požarevac, Serbia, Yugoslavia
- Citizenship: Serbia
- Occupations: Actress; dancer; model
- Years active: 2012–2020
- Spouse: Hardik Pandya (m. 2020; sep. 2024)
- Children: 1

Nataša Stanković (Serbian Cyrillic: Наташа Станковић born 4 March 1992) is a Serbian dancer, model and actress based in Mumbai, India. She made her debut in Bollywood films with the political drama Satyagraha directed by Prakash Jha. In 2014, she participated in Bigg Boss 8. She also participated in Nach Baliye 9.

== Career ==
In 2012, Stanković moved to India to pursue a career in acting. She started her career as a model for brands Johnson & Johnson. In 2013, she made her Hindi film debut with the film Satyagraha, directed by Prakash Jha, where she appeared in the dance number "Aiyo Ji" opposite Ajay Devgn. Later in 2014, she appeared in Bigg Boss 8, where she stayed in the house for one month. She gained popularity when she appeared in the popular dance number "DJ Waley Babu" (transl. Mr. DJ player) by Badshah and Aastha Gill.

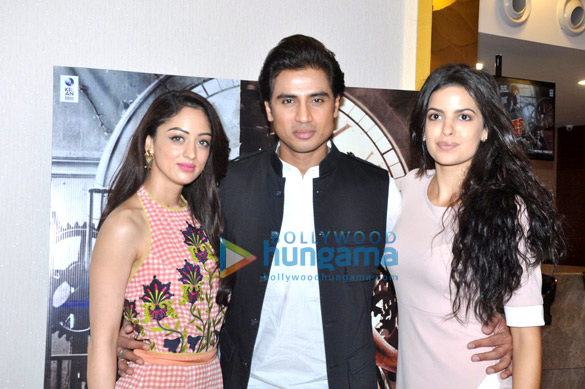
Natasha with Sandeepa Dhar and Shiv Pandit at Media meet of 7 Hours To Go

In 2016, she appeared in the film 7 Hours to Go, directed by Saurabh Varma. In the film, she played the role of a cop and performed in action scenes. In 2017, Stanković was featured in the popular dance number "Mehbooba" (transl. Lover) from the film Fukrey Returns, for which she was praised.

In 2018, she appeared in a cameo in the film Zero, directed by Aanand L. Rai, alongside Shah Rukh Khan, Anushka Sharma and Katrina Kaif. Stanković made her digital debut in 2019 with the web series The Holiday by Zoom Studios alongside Adah Sharma. She was seen in the dance reality television series Nach Baliye 9 alongside Aly Goni.

== Personal life ==
Stanković was born on 4 March 1992 in Požarevac, Republic of Serbia, SFR Yugoslavia to Goran and Radmila Stanković. She has a brother named Nenad Stanković.

Stanković became engaged to Indian cricketer Hardik Pandya on 1 January 2020. On 31 May 2020, amid the COVID-19 lockdown, the couple tied the knot at a low-key court wedding. Their first child, Agastya H Pandya, was born on 30 July 2020. On 14 February 2023, Stanković and Pandya renewed their wedding vows at a ceremony in Udaipur. The couple mutually separated in July 2024. At the same time, they remain as co-parents for their child Agastya.

== Filmography ==
=== Films ===
Year	Title	Role	Notes	Ref.
2013	Satyagraha	–	Special appearance in song "Aiyo Ji"	
2014	Arima Nambi	–	Special appearance in song "Naanum Unnil Paadhi"	
2014	Dishkiyaoon	Jiya		
2014	Action Jackson	Natasha	Cameo appearance	
2016	Dana Kayonu	Natasha	Special appearance in song "Baare Gange" Kannada film	
2016	7 Hours to Go	Maya		
2017	Fukrey Returns	–	Special appearance in song Mehbooba Song	
2017	Daddy	–	Special appearance in song "Zindagi Meri Dance Dance"	
2018	FryDay	–	Special appearance in song "Jimmy Choo"	
2018	Lupt	–	Special appearance in song "Bhoot Hu Main"	
2018	Zero	Sonali	Cameo appearance	
2019	Jhootha Kahin Ka	–	Special appearance in song "Saturday Night"	
2019	Yaaram	–	Special appearance in song "Baby Mera"	
2019	The Body	–	Special appearance in song "Jhalak Dikhlaja Reloaded"	

=== Television ===
Year	Title	Role	Notes	Ref.
2014	Bigg Boss 8	Contestant	Evicted on day 28	
2019	Nach Baliye 9	Contestant	3rd runner-up with Aly Goni	

=== Web series ===
Year	Title	Role	Notes	Ref.
2020	Flesh	Paul Madam (NIA Agent)	Final acting, Eros Now web series	

=== Music videos ===
Year	Title	Artist(s)	Ref.
2014	"DJ Waley Babu"	Badshah and Aastha Gill	
2017	"Nai Shad Da"	Gippy Grewal	
