= Sarala Yeolekar =

Indian actress

Sarala Yeolekar is an actress of Marathi, Hindi and Gujarati cinema. She has acted in over 150 movies.

In Hindi movies, she is best known for her dance in the song "Zooby Zooby" in the movie Dance Dance (1987).

== Selected plays and filmography ==
=== Films ===
- Saticha Vaan (1969)
- Harya Narya Jindabad (1972)
- Pinjara (1972)
- Thapadya (1973)
- Paandu Jamdaar (1977) (Gujarati version of the Marathi film Pandu Havaldar)
- Banya Bapu (1977)
- Jay Vejay (1977)
- Dhakati Mehuni (1978)
- Javayachi Jaat (1979)
- Zakol (1980)
- Shura Mi Vandile (1980)
- Jhatpat Karu De Khapat (1982)
- Raja Gopichanadan (1985) (Gujarati Movie)
- Gaav Ki Naar Gujaratani (1986) (Gujarati Movie)
- Dance Dance (1987)
- Aaj Ke Angaare (1988)
- Paap Ki Duniya (1988) as Sharada
- Commando (1988)
- Meri Zabaan (1989)
- Love Love Love (1989)
- Nachnewale Gaanewale (1991)
- Nishchaiy (1992)
- Janmkundali (2003)

Source: Jhatpat Karu...

=== Play ===
- Ashi Vasti Ashi Manasa

== See also ==
- Marathi cinema
