= Aangan Ki Kali =

1979 film directed by Harsh Kohli

- Directed by: Harsh Kohli
- Written by: Indu Kohli
- Produced by: Harsh Kohli
- Starring: Rakesh Roshan; Lakshmi
- Music by: Bappi Lahiri
- Release date: 1979
- Country: India
- Language: Hindi

Aangan Ki Kali is a 1979 Bollywood drama film directed and produced by Harsh Kohli. Music is by Bappi Lahiri. This is one of the few Hindi films that deals with adoption.

== Plot ==
Anmol (Rakesh Roshan) and Sunita (Lakshmi) are a happily married couple. However, Sunita has a serious heart condition. She could risk a dangerous operation or live only a few more years. Her medical condition could get worse if she ever gets pregnant. She falls in love with an orphan named Bhavana and wants to adopt her. But her husband wants Sunita to get better, so they can have their own children. He doesn't care about Bhavana and gets upset with her over her childlike behavior, but when she runs away from home, he goes after her and asks her to come home. Together, they convince Sunita to have the risky operation, from which she recovers. Anmol and Sunita adopt Bhavana, and they all live happily ever after.

== Cast ==
- Rakesh Roshan as Anmol
- Lakshmi (actress) as Sunita
- Prema Narayan as Doctor
- Geeta Khann as Bhavana
- Leela Chitnis

== Music ==
1. "Na Ro Na Munni Tu Na Ro Nanhe Nanhe Moti Yu Na Kho" - Kishore Kumar
2. "Naa Ro Naa Munni (II)" - Kishore Kumar
3. "Saiya Bina Ghar Suna Suna" - Bhupinder Singh, Lata Mangeshkar
4. "Deewana, Deewana, Deewana Hai Kar GayiDeewana" - Bappi Lahiri
5. "Tumhe Kaise Kahu Mai Dil Ki Baat" - Lata Mangeshkar
6. "Dhoop Bhi Dekhi, Dekhi Chhaya" - Aarti Mukherjee
7. "Jai Ho Mata Tumhari" - Aarti Mukherjee, Chandrani Mukherjee
8. "Meri Munni Bata" - Dilraj Kaur, Shivangi Kolhapure
