= 7 Hours to Go =

2016 film by Saurabh Verma

- Directed by: Saurabh Varma
- Written by: Saurabh Varma
- Produced by: Nitika Thakur
- Starring: Shiv Panditt; Sandeepa Dhar; Varun Badola; Nataša Stanković
- Cinematography: Milind Jog
- Edited by: Nitin Pathak
- Music by: Hanif Shaikh; Sugat–Shubham; Mannan Munjal
- Production company: Krian Pictures
- Release date: 24 June 2016
- Running time: 120 minutes
- Country: India
- Language: Hindi

7 Hours to Go is a 2016 Indian thriller film written and directed by Saurabh Varma. Produced by Krian Pictures, the film stars Shiv Panditt, Sandeepa Dhar, Nataša Stanković and Varun Badola Inspired by true events, the film revolves around a hostage crisis and what happens within 7 hours after that incident.

== Plot ==
Arjun comes to Mumbai to visit his fiancé Maya at the city court and is taken aback when he is not able to find her anywhere. He begins to search for Maya and, in an unexpected turn, witnesses an unlikely murder. Frantic and exasperated, he is left with no choice but to take passersby as hostages before he is framed as the killer. The cops try to tackle the situation and within no time realise that Arjun is no ordinary hostage-taker, and it seems next to impossible to apprehend him. With nothing to lose, Arjun lays down his terms. He gives 7 hours for the police to find out the killer.

== Cast ==
- Shiv Panditt as Arjun Ranawat
- Sandeepa Dhar as ACP Nandini Shukla
- Nataša Stanković as Maya
- Varun Badola as Ramesh Dhadke
- Rohit Vir as Kabir Khemka
- Himanshu Malik as Tamim Chakri
- Aakash Dabhade as Inspector Ghorpale
- Vipin Sharma as Inder Kumar Gujral (IK)

== Soundtrack ==
7 Hours To Go

Soundtrack album by Sugat – Shubham, Hanif Shaikh
- Released: 14 March 2016
- Genre: Feature film soundtrack
- Length: 21:17
- Language: Hindi
- Label: Zee Music Company
External audio
- Audio Jukebox on YouTube

The soundtrack of 7 hours to Go consists of 5 songs composed by Sugat–Shubham and Hanif Shaikh.

Tracklist
| No. | Title | Lyrics | Music | Singer(s) | Length |
|---|---|---|---|---|---|
| 1. | "Tere Naina" | Shraddha Bhilave & Sugat Dhanvijay | Sugat – Shubham | Mohammad Irfan & Sarodee Borah | 3:53 |
| 2. | "Zinda Hota Mein" | Shraddha Bhilave | Sugat – Shubham | Nikhil D'Souza | 4:31 |
| 3. | "Zinda Hota Mein" (Reprise) | Shraddha Bhilave | Sugat – Shubham | Jubin Nautiyal | 5:01 |
| 4. | "Dalinder Dance" | Hanif Shaikh & Manoj Yadav | Hanif Shaikh | Hanif Shaikh | 3:57 |
| 5. | "Dalinder Dance" (Remix Version) | Hanif Shaikh & Manoj Yadav | Hanif Shaikh | Hanif Shaikh | 3:54 |
| Total length: | | | | | 21:17 |

== Reception ==
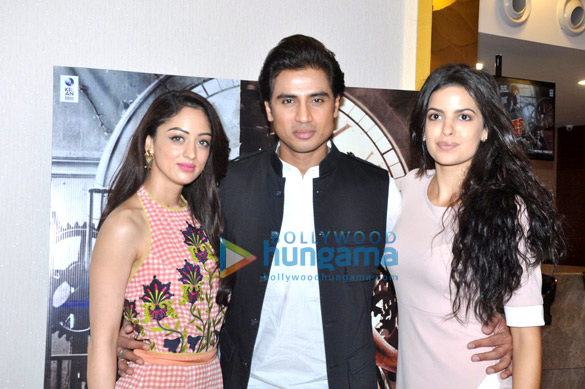
Sandeepa Dhar, Shiv Pandit and Natasa Stankovic Media at meet of '7 Hours To Go'

Mohar Basu of The Times of India gave the film a rating of 2 out of 5 saying that, "7 Hours To Go is gimmicky, lacking both the smarts and the menace of a thriller. The screenplay moves at snail's pace and is completely devoid of tension." Nandini Ramnath of Scroll said that the film is "An incompetent thriller with tacky effects." Rohit Bhatnagar of Deccan Chronicle gave the film a rating of 2.5 out of 5 and said that, "‘7 Hours To Go’ will leave you tangled in a poorly woven web of multiple mysteries. The first half raises your expectations from the film, but all falls flat in the second half." Sankhayan Ghosh of The Hindu said that 7 Hours To Go is "A Mumbai-based hostage movie that has zero tension and an empty emotional core. The film's biggest failure is to not make us care for any of the characters: all victims of terrible crimes." Sarita Tanwar of DNA India gave the film a rating of 2 out of 5 and criticized the director Saurabh Varma saying that, "In a thriller like this, the progression in the script needs to be very effective to keep the viewer engaged. Varma loses control of that in the film's second half. It's almost like he didn't know how to fill the gaps."
