= Dance Dance (film) =

1987 film by Babbar Subhash

- Poster
- Directed by: Babbar Subhash
- Written by: Babbar Subhash
- Produced by: Babbar Subhash
- Starring: Mithun Chakraborty; Smita Patil; Mandakini; Dalip Tahil; Amrish Puri; Om Shivpuri; Shakti Kapoor
- Cinematography: Radhu Karmakar
- Edited by: Mangesh Chavan
- Music by: Bappi Lahiri
- Distributed by: B Subhash Movie Unit
- Release date: 15 May 1987 (India)
- Running time: 153 min.
- Country: India
- Language: Hindi

Dance Dance is a 1987 Indian Hindi-language dance film, directed and produced by Babbar Subhash. The film is a musical and stars Mithun Chakraborty, Smita Patil, and Mandakini . It also stars Amrish Puri, Shakti Kapoor, and Om Shivpuri in supporting roles. It is about a brother and sister who try to find success and become big singers.

Several scenes follow very closely those from the film Fast Forward, directed by Sidney Poitier.

== Plot ==
Radha and Ramu are siblings. Their parents Shyam and Sita are singers. Once, Shyam and Sita go to perform in Jalpaiguri to earn some money, since they are in a poor status and they have to pay a monthly rent. While performing in Jalpaiguri wearing sexy and revealing clothes, Sita catches the eye of a rich and powerful man called A.M. Singh. He stops them mid-way home, kills Shyam and rapes Sita. Radha and Ramu are informed of their parents' deaths. The house proprietor banishes them and they become homeless. Years later, Radha and Ramu have achieved success and are popular singers now. Ramu falls in love with Janita and Radha marries Resham, who is their troupe member. They all sing and perform together. However, Resham becomes different and strange. He comes to abuse Radha. When Ramu discovers that, he tries to prevent him, but Radha does not allow him to do it. Radha finds out that she is pregnant. She comes to inform her husband and finds him with another woman in their bed. She reacts angrily and Resham beats her in such a cruel way, that she dies in the hospital. Ramu loses all interest in life, and even Janita, his new stage partner and lover, is not able to immediately pull him out of depression. In the name of Radha she succeeds. On the way to Jalpaiguri, where the next concert is to take place, Janita is attacked by Mr. Singh's minion, but she is saved by Sita. Having arrived in Jalpaiguri, Ramu recognizes his mother, who tells him what happened many years ago. Ramu organizes a big concert which will be dedicated to his sister. There, Singh appears and attempts to kill Ramu, but Resham, consumed by guilt, saves him and is shot. Singh attempts to kidnap Janita, but Ramu saves her just in time and takes revenge on Singh for his father's life and his mother's honor. Singh is arrested by the police.

== Cast ==
- Mithun Chakraborty as Ramu "Romeo"
- Smita Patil as Radha
- Mandakini as Janita
- Dalip Tahil as Brijmohan/Binjo
- Amrish Puri as A.M. Singh
- Om Shivpuri as David Brown
- Shakti Kapoor as Resham
- Satish Kaul as Shyam, Ramu and Romeo's father
- Sarala Yeolekar as Sita, Ramu and Romeo's mother
- Chandrashekhar Vaidya as S.K. Arora, the owner of Super Cassettes
- Gita Siddharth as the wife of S.K. Arora
- Yunus Parvez as a film producer, in an uncredited guest appearance

== Soundtrack ==
The music for Dance Dance is inspired by the Italo disco style of the eighties and its well known artists such as Modern Talking. The main melody of "Zooby Zooby" copies that of the song "Brother Louie". The singer Alisha Chinai makes here one of her first playback singing steps in "Zooby Zooby". Themes from Chariots of Fire and Star Wars feature as incidental music. The song "Dil Mera Todo Na" is heavily derived by the English band UB40's Don't Break My Heart.

The lyrics of all songs were written by Anjaan, and music of all songs were composed by Bappi Lahiri.

In 2009, the song Zooby Zooby remake by Sourabhee Debbarma on her first album "Meherbaan Sourabhee" the music was remake by Harpeet Singh and Ajay Singha under label Sony Music Entertainment India.

Thirty years after the original release, the song "Zindagi Meri Dance Dance" was re-discovered and had a second lease of life in director Ashim Ahluwalia's 2017 gangster film Daddy starring Arjun Rampal. The re-release of the song was a huge success, becoming one of the top tracks of the year.

According to Cinestaan, "In Daddy, director Ashim Ahluwalia gave a fitting tribute to Bappi Lahiri's composition 'Zindagi Meri Dance Dance' from Babbar Subhash's Dance Dance (1987)."

Ironically Zindagi Meri Dance Dance was left out of the Babbar Subhash film Dance Dance although it featured on the vinyl album release at the time.

Ahluwalia wanted an authentic 80s Bappi Lahiri sound and not an overproduced remix. Norwegian producer Olefonken reworked the song to be more dynamic for contemporary sound systems but kept many of the original elements including the original vocals of Alisha Chinai and Vijay Benedict as well as the original synth and drum machines. The choreographer of Ahluwalia's first film Miss Lovely, was ironically Kamal Nath, who had also worked on B. Subhash's disco film Dance Dance and Commando starring Mithun Chakraborty, both of which feature Bappi Lahiri soundtracks.

Another song from the Dance Dance soundtrack album "Zooby Zooby" was recreated by Rochak Kohli and sung by Sukriti Kakar in the film Naam Shabana (2017).

In 2022, the song "Zooby Zooby" got a remake for film Dhokha: Round D Corner, sung by Zahrah S Khan and Yash Narvekar with Tanishk Bagchi as composer and Kumaar as lyricist.

| No. | Title | Singer(s) | Length |
|---|---|---|---|
| 1. | "Dance Dance" | Alisha Chinai, Vijay Benedict | 08:21 |
| 2. | "Halwa Wala Aa Gaya" | Uttara Kelkar, Vijay Benedict, Sarika Kapoor | 09:01 |
| 3. | "Dance With Pa Pa" | Vijay Benedict | 07:18 |
| 4. | "Dil Mera Todo Na" | Alisha Chinai | 09:05 |
| 5. | "Zindagi Meri Dance Dance" | Alisha Chinai, Vijay Benedict | 07:10 |
| 6. | "Yaar Mera Kho Gaya" | Alisha Chinai | 07:44 |
| 7. | "Aap Ke Saamne Pehli Baar" | Alisha Chinai | 02:34 |
| 8. | "Zooby Zooby" | Alisha Chinai | 06:08 |
| 9. | "Romeo" | Alisha Chinai, Vijay Benedict | 06:18 |
| 10. | "Super Dancer" | Alisha Chinai, Bappi Lahiri | 06:28 |
| 11. | "Aa Gaya Aa Gaya Halwa Wala Aa Gaya" (version 2)" | Asha Bhosle, Vijay Benedict |

== Release ==
The film was a hit at the box office and fourteenth highest-grossing movie of 1987. A Russian-dubbed version of Dance Dance was released all across the Soviet Union in 1989 by Soviet film company Gorki Film Studio "Танцуй, танцу (Индия, 1987, 2 серии)". VK.com.
