= Hemant Birje =

Indian actor (born 1965)

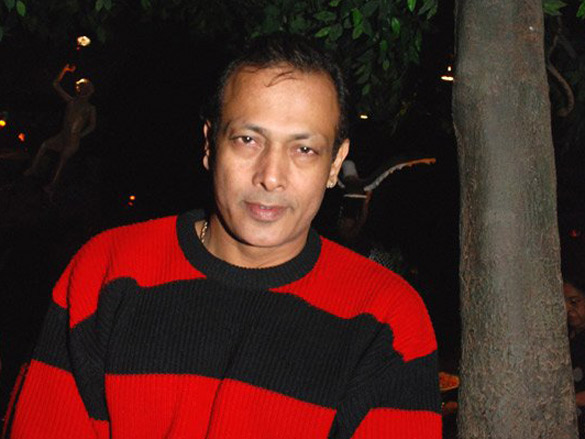
- Birje in 2007
- Born: 19 August 1965 (age 61); Pune, Maharashtra, India
- Occupation: Actor
- Years active: 1985–present
- Spouse: Reshma Birje

Hemant Birje (born 19 August 1965) is an Indian actor who works primarily in Hindi language films. In 1985, he debuted as Tarzan in Babbar Subhash's Adventures of Tarzan, also starring Kimi Katkar. He has had mixed success in later films. He was a regular actor in Mithun Chakraborty films. In 2005, Birje appeared in Garv: Pride and Honour, starring Salman Khan. He has also appeared in Malayalam and Telugu movies.

== Filmography ==
- Adventures of Tarzan (1985) as Tarzan
- Tahkhana (1986) as Heera
- Dilruba Tangewali (1987)
- Veerana (1988) as Hemant
- Aaj Ke Angaarey (1988)
- Bijlee Aur Toofan (1988)
- Commando (1988) as Dilher Singh
- Kabrastan (1988) as Rocky D'Souza
- Maar Dhaad (1988) as Shankar
- Paanch Fauladi (1988)
- Mardangi (1988)
- Aag Ke Sholay (1988)
- Sindoor Aur Bandook (1989)
- Lashkar (1989)
- Ab Meri Baari (1989)
- Paanch Paapi (1989) as Bheema
- Paap Ki Sazaa (1989)
- Sau Saal Baad (1989) as Vikas
- Awaragardi (1990)
- Kasam Dhande Ki (1990) as Bholashankar
- Jaan Lada Denge (1990)
- Maa Kasam Badla Loonga (1990) as Ravi
- Kaun Kare Kurbanie (1991) as Shyam
- Aaj Ka Samson (1991)
- Ajooba Kudrat Ka (1991)
- Kasam Kali Ki (1991) as Vikram Singh
- Giraft (1992)
- Ikke Pe Ikka (1994) as Pehelwan
- Angaara (1996) as Chotu
- Muqadar (1996) as Sudhir
- Indraprastham (1996) as Shyam Kaushik
- Divine Lovers (1997) as Chandra
- Suraj (1997) as Ramavtar in guest appearance
- Sher-E-Hindustan (1998) as 1st son of Choudhary
- Chandaal (1998) as Hemant
- Hafta Vasuli (1998) as Tamancha Bihari
- Hitler (1998) as Vicky Roy
- Aaya Toofan (1999) as Sultan Balachi
- Teri Mohabbat Ke Naam (1999) as Police Inspector Kulkarni
- Maa Kasam (1999) as Anand
- Sikandar Sadak Ka (1999)
- Bhairav (2001) as R.S. Jindal's (Puneet Issar) henchman
- Junglee Tarzan (2001)
- Saugandh Geeta Ki (2001)
- Bholi Bhali Ladki (2001)
- Kasam (2001)
- Arjun Devaa (2001) as Yogeshwar Choudhry
- Bhooka Sher (2001)
- Zakhmi Sherni (2001)
- Zaroorat (2001)
- Jagira (2001)
- Tarzan Ki Beti (2002)
- Shiva Ka Insaaf (2003)
- Lakeer - Forbidden Lines (2004) as Anees
- Garv: Pride and Honour (2004) as Majid Khan
- Golden Bar (2004)
- Team: The Force (2009)
- Simha (2010) as Veerakesavudu's brother
- Who's There? (2011)
- Savdhan - Ek Adbhut Kahaani (2019)
- Surya (2023)
