= Zakhmee =

Zakhmee translation hindi (wounded)
- Poster
- Directed by: Raja Thakur
- Written by: Humayun Mirza
- Produced by: Tahir Hussain
- Starring: Sunil Dutt; Asha Parekh; Rakesh Roshan; Reena Roy; Tariq; Helen; Johnny Walker
- Cinematography: Munir Khan
- Edited by: Madhu Sinha
- Music by: Bappi Lahiri
- Release date: 28 July 1975
- Country: India
- Language: Hindi

Zakhmee is a 1975 Hindi movie. Produced by Tahir Hussain, the film was directed by Raja Thakur. It stars Sunil Dutt, Asha Parekh, Rakesh Roshan, Reena Roy, Tariq, Helen, Johnny Walker, Agha, Iftekhar in pivotal roles. The music was composed by Bappi Lahiri, who later said that this film was his first claim to fame. The film performed "Above Average" at the box office, according to one source.

== Plot ==
On the night of his marriage to Asha (Asha Parekh), Anand (Sunil Dutt) is arrested for allegedly murdering his business partner, and held in prison until his trial takes place. Anand refuses to say anything in his favor, thus leading his lawyer to conclude that Anand did commit this homicide. Refusing to believe that their brother could murder, Amar and Pawan (Rakesh Roshan and Tariq respectively) kidnap Judge Ganguly's (Iftekhar) daughter Nisha (Reena Roy), in order to force the judge to declare Anand is not guilty. The results are disastrous.

== Cast ==
- Sunil Dutt as Anand
- Asha Parekh as Asha
- Rakesh Roshan as Amar
- Reena Roy as Nisha
- Tariq as Pawan
- Helen as Sheela
- Kamal Kapoor as Chief
- Johnny Walker as Johny
- Imtiaz Khan as Tiger
- Yunus Parvez as Dilawar
- Jankidas as Jankidas

== Soundtrack ==
Song	Singer
"Dil Mein Holi Jal Rahi Hai"	Kishore Kumar
"Jalta Hai Jiya Mera Bheegi Bheegi Raaton Mein"	Kishore Kumar, Asha Bhosle
"Nothing Is Impossible, Kehta Hoon Main Sach Bilkul, Aao Yaaron Dance Karen, Rhythm Par Romance Karen"	Kishore Kumar, Bappi Lahiri, Mohammed Rafi
"Aao Tumhe Chand Pe"	Lata Mangeshkar
"Abhi Abhi Thi Dushmani"	Lata Mangeshkar
