= Zindagi Meri Dance Dance =

Song by Alisha Chinai, Vijay Benedict

from the album Dance Dance, Daddy
- Language: Hindi
- Genre: disco, filmi, dance pop
- Composer: Bappi Lahiri
- Lyricist: Anjaan

Music video
- "Zindagi Meri Dance Dance" on YouTube

"Zindagi Meri Dance Dance" (transl. My Life is Dance Dance) is a song from the 1987 Hindi film Dance Dance. The song has a remix version in 2017 film Daddy. The film's director Ashim Ahluwalia wanted to make a tribute to composer Bappi Lahiri, so he worked with Norwegian DJ Olefonken to remix the song. It originally composed by Bappi Lahiri and sung by Alisha Chinai in the film Dance Dance. DJ Olefonken recreated it for 2017 film Daddy. But he retained the original singers' voice.

== Music video ==
=== 1987 version ===
It originally composed by Bappi Lahiri and sung by Alisha Chinai. Mithun Chakraborty was featured in the music video.

=== 2017 version ===
Actor Arjun Rampal and Serbian dancer Nataša Stanković were featured in the music video.
