= Babbar Subhash =

Indian film director

Babbar Subhash is an Indian film director, producer and screenwriter who primarily works in Hindi films. He is known for his film collaborations with actor Mithun Chakraborty including Disco Dancer (1982), Kasam Paida Karne Wale Ki (1984), and Dance Dance (1987).

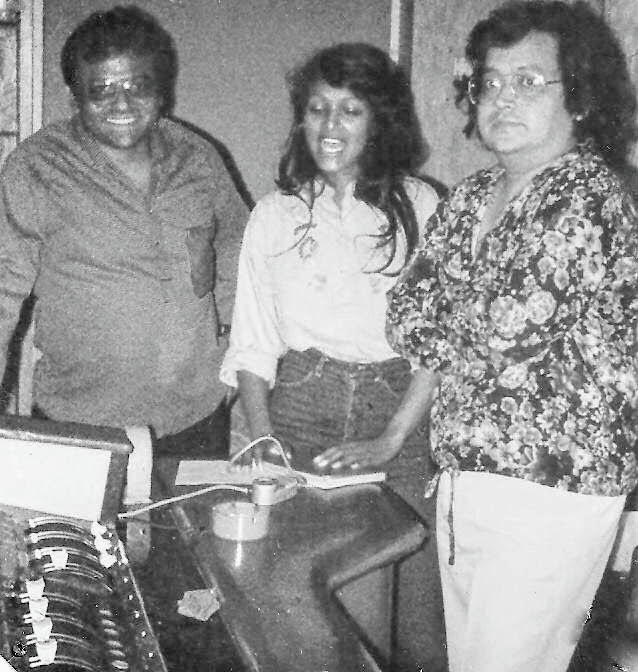
Subhash (in left), with Bappi Lahiri and Parvati Khan during the record of "Jimmy Jimmy" for Disco Dancer (1981).

== Filmography ==
- Surakksha
- Wardat
- Apna Khoon
- Zalim
- Taqdeer Ka Badshah
- Disco Dancer
- Kasam Paida Karne Wale Ki
- Aandhi-Toofan
- Adventures of Tarzan
- Dance Dance
- London Calling
- Aaj Ke Angaarey
- Commando
- Love Love Love
- Pyar Ke Naam Qurbaan
- Nachnewale Gaanewale
- Divine Lovers
- Dulhan Banoo Main Teri
- Classic Dance of Love
- Pyaar Ka Saaya (as a producer)
