= Kasam Paida Karne Wale Ki =

1984 film by Babbar Subhash

- Promotional Poster
- Directed by: Babbar Subhash
- Written by: Rahi Masoom Reza (Dialogues)
- Story by: Babbar Subhash
- Produced by: Babbar Subhash
- Starring: Mithun Chakraborty; Smita Patil; Salma Agha; Amrish Puri
- Cinematography: Nadeem Khan
- Edited by: Mangesh Chavan; Shyam Gupte
- Music by: Bappi Lahiri; Anjaan
- Distributed by: B. Subhash Film Unit
- Release date: 15 November 1984
- Country: India
- Language: Hindi
- Budget: ₹1.40 Crore
- Box office: est.₹5.50 Crore

Kasam Paida Karne Wale Ki (transl. Promise on the one who birthed me) is a 1984 Indian Hindi-language masala film produced and directed by Babbar Subhash, starring Mithun Chakraborty (in double role), Smita Patil, Salma Agha, Karan Razdan, Geeta Siddharth and Amrish Puri. It was remade in Tamil as Mangamma Sabadham (1985).

== Plot ==
Satish Kumar is the only heir to a vast estate, managed by his uncle Udaybhan Singh. Udaybhan has conditioned Satish from childhood to be afraid of him, and this fear persists into Satish's adulthood, leaving him unable to stand up for himself.

Satish is devastated to learn that his wife Aarti had married him only to rob him of cash and jewels. Aarti is thrown out by Udaybhan, but Satish goes after her and they reconcile. Udaybhan kills Satish and convinces the police it was suicide. Aarti swears vengeance via Satish's unborn son whom she is pregnant with.

Years later, Udaybhan is now living with his son Chandrabhan in the mansion formerly owned by Satish, when Aarti and her grown son Avinash surface again. Avinash files a court case to prove his paternity from Satish, but due to an outburst in court is jailed briefly. Avinash's girlfriend Neena gets Chandrabhan drunk and records him on audio admitting that Udaybhan killed Satish.

Avinash plays the recording to Udaybhan in an attempt to make Udaybhan confess to the police, but Udaybhan kidnaps Neena instead and Avinash has to rescue her. Avinash then kidnaps Chandrabhan to make Udaybhan confess, but Udaybhan kidnaps Aarti and Neena and also kills Avinash's aunt. Udaybhan arranges with Avinash for a hostage exchange. After getting back Chandrabhan in the exchange, Udaybhan attempts to kill Neena and Aarti. A huge fight scene ensues, during which Chandrabhan and all their henchmen are killed. Avinash kills Udaybhan with the same knife that Udaybhan killed Satish with, thereby completing Aarti's vengeance. Avinash and Neena celebrate romantically.

== Cast ==
- Mithun Chakraborty as Satish Kumar and Avinash S. Kumar (Double Role)
- Smita Patil as Aarti S. Kumar
- Salma Agha as Neena
- Amrish Puri as Udaybhan Singh
- Gita Siddharth as Satish's Daimaa
- Jagdish Raj as Judge
- Karan Razdan as Chanderbhan U. Singh
- Master Subramanium as Child Mithun Chakraborty
- Bob Christo as Udaybhan's Assistant
- Yunus Parvez as Bansilal
- Gurbhachan Singh as Banke
- Manik Irani as Ballu Dada
- Viju Khote as Hotel Owner
- Jankidas as Secretary

== Soundtrack ==
All lyrics are written by Anjaan; all music is composed by Bappi Lahiri.

No.	Title	Singer(s)	Length
1.	"Dance Dance (Jhoom Jhoom Jhoom Baba)" (I)	Salma Agha
2.	"Jeena Bhi Kya Hai Jeena" (I)	Bappi Lahiri, Salma Agha
3.	"Come Closer"	Salma Agha
4.	"Kasam Paida Karne Wale Ki"	Vijay Benedict
5.	"Jeena Bhi Kya Hai Jeena" (II)	Bappi Lahiri, Salma Agha
6.	"Dance Dance" (II)	Bappi Lahiri, Salma Agha

== Popular culture ==
Kasam Paida Karne Wale Ki features a dance sequence called Jeena Bhi Kya Hai Jeena Teri Ankhon Ke Bina clearly modeled on Michael Jackson's video "Thriller", in which the ghoulish characters do a synchronised dance in a graveyard. The soundtrack of this song is inspired by Michael Jackson's "Billie Jean".

The film has recently gained attention for the filmi funk/jazz/soul song "Come Closer", produced by Bappi Lahiri and sung by the film's actress Salma Agha. The song has been sampled in various (particularly hip hop) songs in recent years, including "My Life" (2006) by Dabrye featuring Showbiz and A.G., "The Medicine" (2006) by Planet Asia, "The Hitman (Kutmasta Kurt Remix)" (2006) by Create & Devastate featuring Masta Ace and Stricklin (2006), "Saanks Mä Murista Sun Muffinssiin" (2008) by Edu Kehäkettunen and DJPP featuring Stig Dogg, "Cattivi e buoni" (2006) by Club Dogo and Come Closer (2009) by Onra. It also features in the movie Lion.

== Box office ==
The film was released on 15 November 1984 at the budget of (₹1.40 cr). Opening day it collected (₹16 lkh) and opening week it collected (₹1.23 cr). India net box office collections were (₹3.56 cr) and worldwide gross collections were (₹5.50 cr). Overseas gross collection's were (₹5.50 cr) and it was Superhit at Box Office India

It was rated at 5.7/10 stars it was ninth highest grossing film of India.
