= Daddy (2017 film) =

2017 Indian film by Ashim Ahluwalia

- Theatrical release poster
- Directed by: Ashim Ahluwalia
- Written by: Arjun Rampal; Ashim Ahluwalia
- Dialogues by: Ritesh Shah; Asad Hussain
- Produced by: Rutvij Patel; Arjun Rampal
- Starring: Arjun Rampal; Aishwarya Rajesh
- Cinematography: Jessica Lee Gagné; Pankaj Kumar
- Edited by: Deepa Bhatia; Navnita Sen
- Music by: Songs: Sajid–Wajid; Score: Naren Chadavarkar; Benedict Taylor
- Production companies: Kundalini Entertainment; Karta Entertainment
- Release date: 8 September 2017
- Running time: 134 minutes
- Country: India
- Language: Hindi
- Box office: est.₹15.5 crore

Daddy is a 2017 Hindi-language biographical crime drama film co-written and directed by Ashim Ahluwalia. The film stars Arjun Rampal, who also co-wrote and produced the film, portraying gangster-turned-politician Arun Gawli, alongside Aishwarya Rajesh in her Hindi film debut.

The film was released on 8 September 2017, and received mixed reviews from critics, emerging as a commercial failure.

== Plot ==
In the 1960s and late 1970s, when Mumbai's textile mills are shutting down one after the other, many unemployed youths, including Arun Gawli, resort to matka-gambling on the insistence of his friends, Rama Naik and Babu Reshim, to earn a quick buck and form their own gang. However, soon, Gawli finds himself getting trapped in a vortex of crime when he is taken under the wing of Maqsood Bhai after committing a murder. Further, their clashes of ideologies and power games turn them against each other. Meanwhile, Gawli marries his sweetheart Zubeida Mujawar, who coaxes him to leave behind his criminal profession. He almost makes up his mind to turn clean. But, when Rama gets killed in a brutal police encounter, Gawli takes charge of their gang based in Dagdi. He suspects that Rama's killing was engineered by Maqsood and thus begins a gruesome gang war between them. Hot on the heels is a cop, Vijaykar Nitin, who wants to nab Gawli at any cost and bring him to justice. The rest of the plot revolves around how one of India's most feared gangsters landed in politics and his transition to becoming 'Daddy'.

== Cast ==
- Arjun Rampal as Arun Gawli
- Aishwarya Rajesh as Zubeida Mujawar / Asha Gawli
- Nishikant Kamat as Inspector Vijaykar Nitin
- Rajesh Shringarpure as Rama Naik
- Purnanand Wandekar as Vijay
- Anupriya Goenka as Hilda
- Shruti Bapna as Rani
- Usha Naik as Arun's mother
- Shrikant Yadav as Sada
- Deepak Damle as Phamplet Bandya
- Raj Arjun as Rafique
- Mir Sarwar as Samaad Khan
- Vijay Sanap as Salim Gurda
- Abhimanue Arun as Newman
- Anand Ingle as Babu Reshim
- Vidhyadhar Joshi as Politician
- Richa Meena as Geeta Gawli
- Vijay Nikam as Ashok Joshi
- Girish Pal as Sachit
- Vishal O Sharma as Vakil
- Sanjay Mhatre as MLA Mhatre
- Farhan Akhtar as Maqsood (based on Dawood Ibrahim) (cameo appearance)
- Nataša Stanković as item dancer in the song "Dance Dance"

== Soundtrack ==
The music of the film was composed by Sajid–Wajid. The song "Zindagi Meri Dance Dance" from the 1987 film Dance Dance was recreated by Olefonken.

Daddy

Soundtrack album by Sajid–Wajid
- Released: September 21, 2017
- Genre: Feature film soundtrack
- Length: 15:16
- Label: T-Series

No.	Title	Lyrics	Music	Singer(s)	Length
1.	"Eid Mubarak Qawwali"	Danish Sabri	Sajid–Wajid	Shabab Sabri, Tanvir Hussain	3:18
2.	"Aala Re Aala Ganesha"	Prashant Ingole	Sajid–Wajid	Wajid Ali, Ganesh Chandanshive	5:32
3.	"Zindagi Meri Dance Dance" (Recreated by Olefonken)	Anjaan	Bappi Lahiri	Alisha Chinai, Vijay Benedict	6:25
Total length:					15:16

== Reception ==
Subhash K. Jha of NDTV gave 3 out of 5 stars, writing "Arjun Rampal plays Arun Gawli as a time bomb waiting to explode. There are no extra toppings, bonuses to this performance". Udita Jhunjhunwala of Firstpost wrote "Arjun Rampal's intense act elevates Ashim Ahluwalia's brave biopic". Shubhra Gupta of The Indian Express gave 2.5/5 stars writing "The Arjun Rampal starrer has a thickly-populated circuitous plot, which goes back and forth in time, which comes in the way of a solid crime thriller cum study of the making of a gangster". Sweta Kaushal of Hindustan Times gave 2/5 stars, and wrote "The film romanticises the hero (Arjun Rampal as Arun Gawli) and then serves the usual formula gangster fare. Where it fails, however, is keeping it all coherent". Ananya Bhattacharya of India Today gave 2.5/5 stars writing "Arjun Rampal steps into the shoes of gangster Arun Gawli in his biopic, Daddy. The film is disappointing as both a biopic and an entertainer".
