= Commando (1988 film) =

- Promotional poster
- Directed by: B.Subhash
- Written by: Dr. Rahi Masoom Reza (dialogues); B.Subhash
- Produced by: Mushir-Riaz
- Starring: Mithun Chakraborty; Mandakini; Hemant Birje; Kim
- Cinematography: Radhu Karmakar
- Edited by: Mangesh Chavan
- Music by: Bappi Lahiri
- Production company: M. R. Productions
- Release date: 17 June 1988
- Running time: 135 minutes
- Country: India
- Language: Hindi

Commando is a 1988 Hindi-language Indian action film directed by B.Subhash and produced by Mushir-Riaz. The film stars Mithun Chakraborty, Mandakini, Hemant Birje, Kim in lead roles. It was a commercial success at the box-office.

== Plot ==
The film starts with an assassination attempt that fails as a police inspector jumps in front of and saves the minister. The police dies, and his wife goes mad. The son, Mithun, grows by training himself, and at the same time cares for his mother, who is in treatment for mental illness. Mithun, saves Mandakini during a murder attempt by the gunmen of Shakthi Kapoor. Gradually both fall in love, but Mandakini`s father is against it.

Mandakini`s father is in good terms with the villain to get Mithun arrested since Mithun got trapped by Shakthi Kapoor with a lorry full of explosives, during which Mithun overhears a conversation among the villains about an assassination attempt. Mandakini gets kidnapped by the villains, but Mithun rescues Mandakini and kills the villains. In the final scene, it is shown that the assassination attempt is defeated by Mithun. Mithun`s mother, also attending this function, suddenly gets her memory back, recognises Mithun and accepts Mandakini as her daughter in law.

== Cast ==
- Shashi Kapoor as Inspector General
- Mithun Chakraborty as Chandar
- Mandakini as Asha Malhotra
- Hemant Birje as Diler Singh
- Kim as Zoom-Zoom
- Dalip Tahil as Moolchand Bhalla
- Danny Denzongpa as Ninja
- Shakti Kapoor as Mirza
- Amrish Puri as Marcellony
- Om Shivpuri as Kailashpuri Malhotra
- Asrani as Driver
- Satish Shah as Ram Chong
- Mac Mohan as Security Officer
- Sarala Yeolekar as Chandar's Mother
- Satish Kaul as Chandar's Father
- Bob Christo as Marcellony's Henchman
- Tom Alter as Hatcher
- Asha Sharma as Indira Gandhi
- Iftekhar as Restaurant Manager
- Shashi Kiran as Police Inspector
- Ajit Vachani as Doctor
- Praveen Kumar as Marcellony's Guard
- Manik Irani as Chief Security Officer

== Soundtrack ==
Commando

Film score
- Released: 1988
- Genre: Feature film soundtrack
- Length: 49:27
- Label: T-Series

The lyrics are written by Anjaan and the music is composed by Bappi Lahiri.

Song	Singer
"O Dada O Dada"	Kishore Kumar, Asha Bhosle
"Ga Ga Ga Gaadi Chale"	Kishore Kumar, Asha Bhosle
"Maine Maine Tujhe Tujhe Kiya Kiya Pyar Kiya"	Alisha Chinoy, Vijay Benedict
"Mera Naam Jhum Jhum, Main Tumhare Liye Aayi Hoon, Aage Aage Dekhiye"	Alisha Chinoy, Vijay Benedict, Shailendra Singh
"O Mere Apne O Mere Sapne"	Vijay Benedict
"Commando Commando"	Alisha Chinoy, Vijay Benedict
"O Mere Apne O Mere Sapne" (Sad)	Vijay Benedict
