= Dalip Tahil =

Indian actor

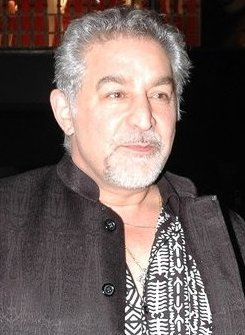
- Tahil in 2017
- Born: Dalip Tahilramani; 30 October 1952 (age 74); Agra, Uttar Pradesh, India
- Occupation: Actor
- Years active: 1974–present

Dalip Tahil (born Dalip Tahilramani; 30 October 1952) is an Indian film, television and theatre actor. He is best known for his work in Baazigar (1993), Raja (1995), Hum Hain Rahi Pyar Ke (1993) and Qayamat Se Qayamat Tak (1988), Pyaar Ki Miss Call (2009) along with actor Gaurav Prateek. In the UK, he appeared in the BBC soap opera EastEnders as Dan Ferreira, the head of the Ferreira family, from June to December 2003.

== Early life and education ==
Dalip Tahilramani was born on 30 October 1952 in Agra, Uttar Pradesh, India into a Sindhi Hindu family which had recently migrated from Sindh during the Partition of India. He studied at Sherwood College in Nainital, India. After attending Aligarh Muslim University for a year, he graduated from St. Xavier's College, Mumbai.

== Career ==
=== Stage ===
Tahil began to appear on stage while at Sherwood College, Nainital, at the age of 10. His participation over the years in choir, elocution competitions, nativity plays, and formal and informal concerts gave him a platform to be cast in principal parts. During his senior years at school, he won the Kendall Cup for the best actor in two consecutive years, first as Joseph in the play My Three Angels and again as Macbeth in Shakespeare's Macbeth. He was declared the best actor for a record third time in 1969, his final year at Sherwood College.

Tahil moved with his family to Mumbai in 1968, joined the Theatre Group Bombay and trained under its directors, Alyque and Pearl Padamsee. He appeared in some of its major productions, playing John the Baptist and Jesus in Godspell (India's first English theatre musical, directed by Pearl Padamsee), and Stanley Kowalski in Tennessee Williams' A Streetcar Named Desire, directed by Alyque Padamsee.

He played Galy Gay, in Amal Alana's production of Bertolt Brecht's Man Is a Man.

Tahil is internationally known for starring as Madan Kumar in the A.R Rahman theatre musical Bombay Dreams, which he performed in over 500 times until 2002 at the Apollo Theatre in London.

=== Films ===
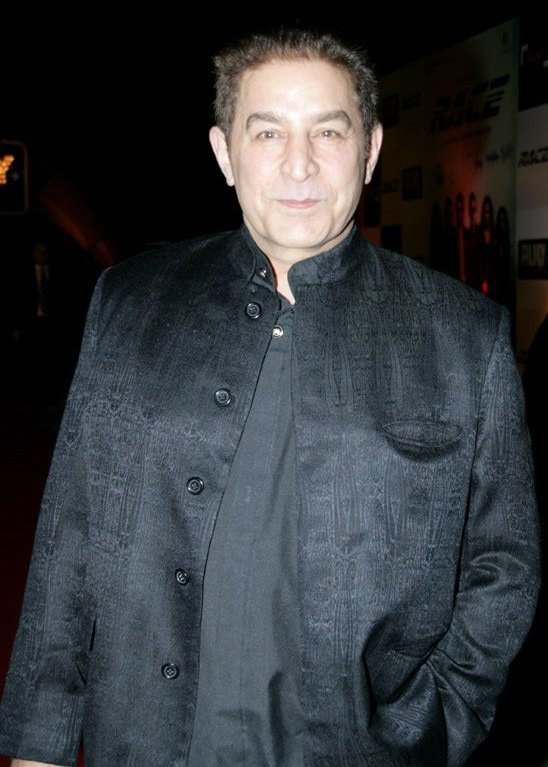
Tahil in 2008

Director Shyam Benegal noticed Dalip and offered him a part in his first feature film Ankur in 1974. In 1980, Ramesh Sippy offered him the role of a villain in his epic production, Shaan. This was followed by a cameo in Sir Richard Attenborough's,Gandhi, in 1982.

He went on to play principal character roles of a villain or supporting role of a father, police officer, in over 100 Bollywood films from the 1980s to 2013. He appeared in the Merchant Ivory English films The Deceivers and The Perfect Murder (1988).

In 1984, he acted as the father of Baby Sonia in India's first 3-D film, My Dear Kuttichathan, produced by Navodaya. In 2013, he portrayed Jawaharlal Nehru, in Rakeysh Om Prakash Mehra's, Bhaag Milkha Bhaag, with Farhan Akhtar in the title role of Milkha Singh. In 2007, he starred in the Punjabi movie, Sajna ve Sajna. He is well remembered for his villainous role of Madan Chopra, a wicked businessman in Baazigar (1993). Dalip has also played the role of Rupert Desai in Mission Mangal.

=== Television ===
On television, Tahil played roles in Sanjay Khan's television serial The Sword of Tipu Sultan and Ramesh Sippy's Buniyaad. Thereafter, Tahil worked in his first British television series, Bombay Blue (TV series).

Tahil gained national recognition across the UK when he won the role of Dan Ferreira, in the iconic BBC One soap opera EastEnders in 2003, appearing in over 60 episodes. He made his last appearance in the episode aired on 30 December 2003. As a result of an insufficient work permit application, Dalip had to exit the series which compelled him to appeal to the Secretary of State in the UK. Dalip was subsequently granted indefinite leave to remain in the UK in 2005.

In 2007, Tahil appeared in the BBC Two mini-series Nuclear Secrets in the episode "Terror Traders", playing Pakistani scientist Abdul Qadeer Khan. He later played the role of King Dasharatha in the Indian television series, Siya Ke Ram, which premiered on 16 November 2015 through Star Plus and concluded on 4 November 2016.

=== Music ===
He released an album titled Raaz Ki Baaten.

== Selected filmography ==
- Ankur (1974)
- Shaan (1980) as Kumar
- Shakti (1982) as Ganpat Rai
- Gandhi (1982) as Zia
- Arth (1982) as Dilip
- My Dear Kuttichathan (Malayalam) (1984) as Laxmi's father, [India's first 3D Film]
- Aaj Ki Awaz (1984) as Suresh Thakur
- Trikaal (1985) as Leon Gonsalves
- Adventures of Tarzan (1985) as D.K.
- Janbaaz (1986) as Farm Manager
- Sultanat (1986) as Janna
- Aakhree Raasta (1986) as Police Inspector / Police Commissioner Roop Kumar Sahay
- Buniyaad (1987) TV serial on DD National as "Bhushan" Haveli Ram's Eldest Son
- Jalwa (1987) as D.D.'s Henchman
- Nazrana as Banke
- Dance Dance (1987) as Brijmohan "Binjo"
- Kaash (1987) as Vijay
- Mere Baad (1988) as Jeevan
- Qayamat Se Qayamat Tak (1988) as Dhanraj Singh
- The Deceivers (1988) as Daffadar Ganesha
- The Perfect Murder (1988) as Dilip Lal
- Ram Lakhan (1989) as Thakur Pratap Singh
- Tridev (1989) as Don
- Love Love Love (1989) as Amit's Father
- The Sword of Tipu Sultan (1989) on DD National
- Kishen Kanhaiya (1990) as Mahesh
- Ajooba (1991) as Shah Rukh
- Ganga Jamuna Ki Lalkar (1991)
- Dancer (1991) as Brij Bhushan
- Saudagar (1991) as Gajendra Singh
- Vishwatma (1992) as DCP Gupta
- Deewana (1992) as Ramakant Sahay
- Jungle Queen (1993)
- King Uncle (1993) as Pradeep Malik
- Hum Hain Rahi Pyar Ke (1993) as Mr. Bijlani
- Darr (1993) as Captain Mehra
- Baazigar (1993) as Madan Chopra
- Professor Ki Padosan (1993) as Ranjeet
- Suhaag (1994) as Dr. Sinha
- Imtihan (1994) as Dindayal Khanna
- Aatank Hi Aatank (1995) as Robert
- Anokha Andaaz (1995) as Mehta
- Sauda (1995) as Dharamdas
- Raja (1995) as Vishwa Garewal
- Jeet (1996) as Ramakant Sahay
- Shohrat (1996)
- Judwaa (1997) as SP Malhorta
- Ishq (1997) as Harbanslal
- Gupt (1997) as Meghnath Choudhary
- Soldier (1998) as Veerendra Sinha
- Ghulam (1998) as Siddharth's Father
- Mann (1999) as Pratap Singhania
- Dada (1999) as Trikaal Choudhary
- Chal Mere Bhai (2000) as Balraj Oberoi
- Dhai Akshar Prem Ke (2000) as Rai Bahadur
- Kaho Naa Pyaar Hai (2000) as Mr. Malik
- Phir Bhi Dil Hai Hindustani (2000) as Mr. Chinoy
- Mujhe Kucch Kehna Hai (2001) as Karan's father
- Chhupa Rustam: A Musical Thriller (2001) as Diwan Baldev
- Chori Chori Chupke Chupke (2001) as Rajeev Malhotra
- Ajnabee (2001) as Priya's Father
- Love Ke Liye Kuchh Bhi Karega (2001) as Sapna's Father
- Maine Dil Tujhko Diya (2002) as Mr. Chopra
- Talaash (2003) as D.K. Sharma
- EastEnders (2003) as Dan Ferreira (British soap opera)
- Paarewari (2004) as Madhu's father (Sindhi language film)
- Nuclear Secrets (2007) as A.Q Khan
- Shakalaka Boom Boom (2007) as album producer
- Partner (2007) as Raja Singh
- Dhan Dhana Dhan Goal (2007) as Johny Bakshi
- Race (2008) as Kabir Ahuja
- Love Story 2050 (2008) as Karan's fad
- God Tussi Great Ho (2008) as TV station owner, Kewalchandani
- Rock On!! (2008) as Aditya's boss
- Zindagi Tere Naam (2008)
- Sajna Ve Sajna (2008) as Kartar Singh
- Raat Gayi Baat Gayi (2008) as Saxena
- Kisaan (2008)
- Hello (2008) as Subhash Bakshi
- I Can't Think Straight (2008) as Omar
- Dil Bole Hadippa (2009) as Liyaqat Ali Khan (Lucky)
- I Can't Think Straight (2008) as Omar
- Prince (2010)
- Ra.One (2011)
- Loot (2011) as Batliwala
- London, Paris, New York (2012) as Lalitha's father
- Ishkq in Paris (2013) as Akash's father
- Bhaag Milkha Bhaag (2013) as Jawahar Lal Nehru
- War Chhod Na Yaar (2013) as Politician
- Entertainment (2014) as Pannalal Johri
- Anjaan (Tamil) (2014) as JK
- Samvidhaan (2014) TV serial on RS TV as Pandit Nehru
- Phir Se... (2015)
- Welcome 2 Karachi (2015) as Kedar's father
- Jaanisaar (2015) as Kunwar Iqbal Hassan
- Salaam Mumbai (2016)
- Project Marathwada (2016)
- Guardians of the Galaxy Vol. 2 (2017) as Ego (Hindi version)
- Razia Sultan as Marush
- Mission Mangal (2019) as Rupert Desai
- Darbar (Tamil) (2020) as Union Home secretary
- Toolsidas Junior (2022) as Jimmy Tandon
- HIT: The First Case (2022) as Ajit Singh Shekhawat
- Kuberaa (Telugu-Tamil) (2025)
- Hari Hara Veera Mallu: Part 1 (Telugu) (2025) as Abul Hasan Qutb Shah

== Web series ==
- Parchhayee (2019) as Dadaji
- The Family Man (2019) web series on Amazon Prime as Kulkarni
- Hostages (2019) web series on Hotstar as CM Khushwant Lal Handa
- Guilty (2020)
- A New Day Will Be
- Made in Heaven (2019) web series on Amazon Prime as Kishore Khanna

=== Television ===
Year!	Title	Role	Network	Language
1986–1987	Buniyaad	Kulbhushan alias Bhushan	DD National	Hindi
1997	Saturday Suspense		Zee TV	Hindi
2003	EastEnders	Dan Ferreira	BBC One	English
2004	Miss India	Digvijay Singh Chandel	DD National	Hindi
2007	Nuclear Secrets	Abdul Qadeer Khan	BBC Two	English
2015–2016	Siya Ke Ram	Maharaj Dasharath	Star Plus	Hindi
2025	Arabia Kadali	Inayath Khan	Amazon Prime Video	Telugu
2026	The Traitors India	Contestant (4th place)	Amazon Prime Video	Hindi/ English
