= Adventures of Tarzan =

1985 film

- Poster
- Directed by: Babbar Subhash
- Produced by: Babbar Subhash
- Starring: Hemant Birje; Dalip Tahil; Kimi Katkar; Om Shivpuri
- Cinematography: Radhu Karmakar
- Music by: Bappi Lahiri
- Release date: 13 December 1985
- Running time: 135 minutes
- Language: Hindi

Adventures of Tarzan is a 1985 Indian Hindi-language film directed by Babbar Subhash, starring Hemant Birje, Dalip Tahil, Kimi Katkar and Om Shivpuri. The film was much talked about in its time, mainly due to the steamy scenes between the lead actors and popular hit songs. After the release of the film the male leading actor Hemant Birje was popularized as the 'Indian Tarzan' by Indian newspapers. On the other hand, the main female protagonist actress Kimi Katkar was tagged as 'Sex-Siren' for her erotic portrayal in the film.

== Plots ==
This is the popular story of Tarzan retold in the Hindi language. Ruby Shetty and her widowed dad live a wealthy lifestyle. Ruby's father often travels to the deep jungles of India in search of a fabled tribe in the Shakabhoomi region. The people who have tried to trace the tribe have never returned. This time Ruby also decides to accompany her father.

Ruby is introduced to a man named D.K. by her father and he would like her to marry D.K. Days later, Ruby does a number of misadventures and is rescued by an ape-like man called Tarzan and both fall in love. Tarzan has never interacted with the outside world and cannot speak any language well, but he is intrigued by Ruby, annoying D.K.

Ruby's dad and D.K plan to capture Tarzan and take him to work for the Apollo Circus, owned by Krishnakant Verma. Tarzan is captured before Tarzan and Ruby's romance could take wing. Tarzan is chained and taken to the circus and made to spend the rest of his days performing various acts, thus leaving D.K. to marry Ruby. Would Tarzan escape from the circus? Would Ruby agree to marry D.K.? All these questions are answered in the climax.

== Cast ==
- Hemant Birje as Tarzan
- Dalip Tahil as D.K.
- Kimi Katkar as Ruby Shetty
- Om Shivpuri
- Sudhir

== Music ==
1. "A B C D E F G H I J K L M N O P Q R S T U V W" – Sharon Prabhakar, Vijay Benedict
2. "Jile Le Jile Le Aayo Aayo Jile Le" – Bappi Lahiri, Alisha Chinai
3. "Karishma Ye Kabhi Dekha Na Hoga" – Uttara Kelkar
4. "Mere Paas Aaoge Mere Saath Naachoge" – Uttara Kelkar, Vijay Benedict
5. "Tarzan My Tarzan" – Alisha Chinai
6. "Tarzan My Tarzan" V2 – Alisha Chinai
