= Vijay Benedict =

Indian Bollywood playback singer

Vijay Benedict is an Indian former Bollywood playback singer who provided playback for over 35 Bollywood films in the 1980s and early 1990s.

== Career ==
He made his debut as a singer for the hit 1982 film Disco Dancer singing the popular title song "I Am a Disco Dancer" for actor Mithun Chakraborty. The film's director was Babbar Subhash and music director was Bappi Lahiri. He was frequently used as the playback singer for films starring Mithun Chakraborty which were directed by Babbar Subhash and had music by Bappi Lahiri. He also worked with other music directors like Laxmikant Pyarelal, Anand–Milind and Nadeem-Shravan and sang for other actors like Govinda, Jackie Shroff and Aamir Khan. He has sung duets with female singers like Asha Bhosle, Alisha Chinai, Kavita Krishnamurthy, Parvati Khan, and male singers like Mohammed Aziz, Amit Kumar and Kumar Sanu. His career as a playback singer lasted for 10 years from 1982 to 1992. He is currently a gospel singer.

== Personal life ==
He was born in Allahabad to a North Indian Christian family. He studied in Prayagraj, Uttar Pradesh and was a graduate in Business Management. In 1991, his brother was murdered by a mafia gang in Germany after which he quit playback singing. This made him reconnect with his faith and devoting himself to singing for his Christian faith. He is now a gospel singer.

== Notable Bollywood Playback Singing ==
- Disco Dancer (1982) – "I Am a Disco Dancer"
- Kasam Paida Karne Wale Ki (1984) – "Kasam Paida Karne Wale Ki"
- Aandhi-Toofan (1985) – "Banu Ko Mil Gaya Janu"
- Maa Kasam (1985)
- Sadaa Suhagan (1986) – "Hum Hain Naujawan"
- Dance Dance (1987) – "Dance Dance", "Aa Gaya Aa Gaya Halwa Wala", "Everybody Dance with Papa"
- Pyaar Karke Dekho (1987) – "Its My Challenge"
- Commando (1988) – "O Mere Apne", " Maine Maine Tujhe", "Its a Dance Party"
- Hum Intezaar Karenge (1989)
- Farz Ki Jung (1989) "Naachenge Gayengi"
- Sikka (1989) – "Blow Hot Blow Cold"
- Love Love Love (1989) – "We Are in Love", "Jeene Hai Pyar Main Jeena", "Main Tujhse Pyaar Karta Hoon"
- Naachnewale Gaanewale (1990) – "Aayi Naseebowali Raat"
- Yaadon Ke Mausam (1990) – "Dil Dil Hindustan"
- Pyaar Ka Saaya (1991) – "Tu Chaahat Hai Tu Dhadkan Hai"
- Laal Paree (1991) – "No Objection"
- Meri Jaaneman (1992) – "Romance Romance"
- Daddy (2017) – "Zindagi Meri Dance" (from the soundtrack of 1987 film Dance Dance)
