= Charanjit Singh (musician) =

Indian musician (1940–2015)

- Born: 15 December 1940; Bombay, India
- Died: 5 July 2015 (aged 74) Bandra, Mumbai, India
- Genres: Bollywood, electronica, filmi, acid house
- Occupations: Composer, guitarist, Session musician, songwriter
- Instruments: violin, keyboards, bass, lap steel guitar
- Years active: 1960s–2015
- Labels: Gramophone Company of India, Saregama

Charanjit Singh (15 December 1940 – 5 July 2015) was an Indian musician and composer, often regarded as the pioneer of acid house.

For over three decades, he was a core figure in Bollywood’s music industry, performing bass, keyboards, and synthesizers on hundreds of soundtracks. He was part of the inner creative circle of Kishore Kumar, Laxmikant–Pyarelal, and R. D. Burman, touring worldwide with them and shaping the sound of Hindi film music during its golden era.

In 1982, Singh released his debut studio album Synthesizing: Ten Ragas to a Disco Beat, intended as a fusion of electronic disco music with Indian classical ragas. Singh's idiosyncratic production style and distinctive utilisation of the TR-808 drum machine and TB-303 bass synthesizer on the album has led some music journalists to suggest that it is perhaps the earliest example of acid house, and recognizing him as the “father of Acid House.”

== Early and personal life ==
Charanjit Singh was born on 15 December 1940 in Mumbai.

He is the father of acclaimed music director Raju Singh, a composer, arranger, and background music director whose career spans more than 250 films. Raju is best known for his acclaimed scores in films such as Kesari, Murder, and Aashiqui 2, and for cult television themes like C.I.D. and Boogie Woogie, which became part of India’s pop-culture fabric.

His grandson, Joshua Singh, is part of the third generation, emerging as a songwriter, producer, and artist in India’s independent music scene. He is recognized for his emotionally driven, genre-blending sound, and has also built a career producing for other artists.

== Career ==
Singh led a wedding band and recorded and released a number of albums covering popular film songs. These were a form of instrumental elevator music, some of which have since been re-released by Sublime Frequencies, such as his steel guitar renditions of "Manje Re" from Bandhe Haath in 1973 and "Chura Liyaa Hai Tumne" from Yaadon Ki Baaraat in 1975. In 1981, he produced synthesizer-based electronic renditions of the Silsila soundtrack in his record Charanjit Singh: Plays Hit Tunes on Synthesizer of Silsila.

As a prolific session musician from the 1960s to the 1980s, Singh performed on hundreds of Hindi film soundtracks, working closely with composers such as R. D. Burman, S. D. Burman, and Laxmikant–Pyarelal. He was widely recognized for introducing modern electronic textures into film orchestras, and was often called upon for guitar, bass, keyboards, and synthesizer parts.

Notable recordings he contributed to include:

- “Dum Maro Dum” (Hare Rama Hare Krishna, 1971) – keyboards and synthesizer
- “Piya Tu Ab To Aaja” (Caravan, 1971) – organ/synth riffs
- “Chura Liya Hai Tumne Jo Dil Ko” (Yaadon Ki Baaraat, 1973) – guitar and keys
- “Mehbooba Mehbooba” (Sholay, 1975) – synthesizer textures
- “Raat Kali Ek Khwab Mein Aayi” (Buddha Mil Gaya, 1971) – bass/keys
- Soundtrack of Bobby (1973) – bass and synthesizer
- Soundtrack of Amar Akbar Anthony (1977) – keyboards/synths

He also performed extensively with Kishore Kumar on live tours through the 1970s and 1980s, often playing guitar, bass, and transicord. Composer R. D. Burman frequently relied on Singh for guitar and synthesizer textures, with colleagues recalling that “if there was a modern sound Burman wanted, Charanjit was often the first call.” Music directors Laxmikant–Pyarelal valued his ability to adapt quickly in large-scale studio productions such as Amar Akbar Anthony and Bobby, where his bass and synthesizer work helped modernize Bollywood’s orchestral sound.

Beyond Bollywood, Charanjit Singh is best known internationally for his groundbreaking 1982 album Synthesizing: Ten Ragas to a Disco Beat. Created with Roland’s then-new TB-303, TR-808, and Jupiter-8, the record blended Indian classical ragas with disco and electronic sequencing. Singh recorded it in 1982, and was a commercial failure at the time of its original release, but its re-discovery in 2002 and re-issue in early 2010 garnered attention due to comparisons with acid house from the mid to late 1980s. Since then, certain commentators in the music press have recast Singh as an originator of acid house music and the album to be a precursor to acid house, earning Singh posthumous recognition as the “father of Acid House.” He also used the same drum machine and synthesizers for his experimental electronic calypso record, Experiments in Calypso.

== Death ==
Charanjit Singh died of cardiac arrest in his sleep during the midnight of 4 July 2015 at his home in Bandra, Mumbai.

== See also ==
- Goa trance
- House music
- Indi-pop
- Music of India
- Psychedelic music
- Raga rock
