= Bappi Lahiri =

Indian singer and composer (1952–2022)

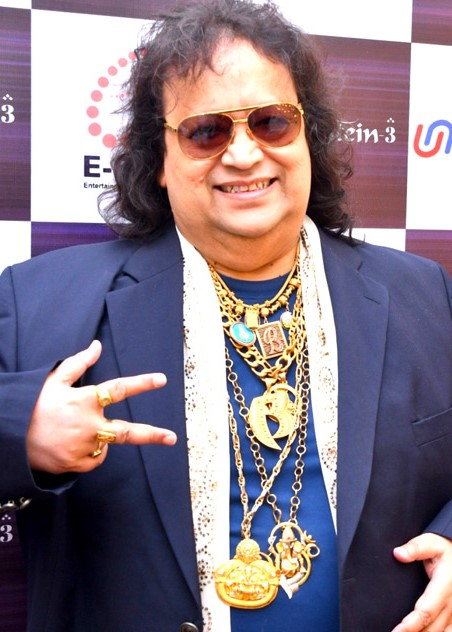
- Lahiri in 2019
- Born: Alokesh Aparesh Lahiri; 27 November 1952; Siliguri, West Bengal, India
- Died: 15 February 2022 (aged 69); Mumbai, Maharashtra, India
- Education: Chetla Boys' High School
- Occupations: Singer; composer; record producer
- Years active: 1972–2022
- Political party: Bharatiya Janata Party
- Musical career
- Instruments: Vocals; tabla; piano; drums; guitar; saxophone; bongos; Dholak
- Labels: BL Sound; Saregama; Venus Records & Tapes; T-Series; Tips Industries; Universal Music Group; Abbey Road Studios; Planet LA Records; Sony Music India
- Website: bappilahiri.com

Bappi Lahiri (born Alokesh Aparesh Lahiri; 27 November 1952 – 15 February 2022), also known as Bappi Da, was an Indian singer, composer and record producer. He popularised the use of synthesised disco music in Indian music industry and sang some of his own compositions. He was popular in the 1980s and 1990s with filmi soundtracks. He delivered major box office successes primarily in Hindi, Telugu, and Bengali films. His music was well received into the 21st century.

In 1986, he was recognised by Guinness World Records for recording more than 180 songs in one year.

== Early life ==
Alokesh Aparesh Lahiri was born on 27 November 1952 in Siliguri, West Bengal. His parents, Aparesh and Bansuri Lahiri, both were Bengali singers and musicians in classical music and Shyama Sangeet. He belonged to the Bengali Hindu Lahiri-Mohan family of Mohanpur, Sirajganj (in present-day Bangladesh). The family migrated to West Bengal after the Partition of Bengal in 1947. His parents met while performing for All India Radio. He was their only child. His relatives include singer Kishore Kumar, his maternal uncle.

Bappi Lahiri began to play tabla at the age of 3. Initially, he was trained by his parents. Bappi showed talent as a child playing the tabla and studied with Samta Prasad on the advice of Lata Mangeshkar.

Since childhood, he idolised American musician Elvis Presley, and was inspired by him to wear multiple gold chains and gold jewellery. He thought of creating his own signature appearance when he becomes successful. Upon becoming successful later, he created his signature "golden jewellery" look inspired by that of Presley. He considered gold to be "lucky" for him.

== Career ==
=== 1970s ===
Lahiri came to Mumbai when he was 19. He received his first opportunity in a Bengali film, Daadu (1972), where Lata Mangeshkar sang his composition. The first Hindi film for which he composed music was Nanha Shikari (1973) and his first Hindi composition was Tu Hi Mera Chanda sung by Mukesh. The turning point of his career was Tahir Husain's Hindi film, Zakhmee (1975), for which he composed music and doubled as a playback singer. He composed a duet with Kishore Kumar and Mohammed Rafi named "Nothing Is Impossible", for the same film. His compositions Jalta Hai Jiya Mera (Kishore Asha duet) and Lata Mangeshkar solos like Abhi Abhi Thi Dushmani and Aao Tumhe Chand from the same film became popular and gave him recognition. The duet "Phir Janam Lenge Hum" sung by Kishore Lata became famous from the film Phir Janam Lenge Hum/Janam Janam Na Saathi. All songs from the film Chalte Chalte (1976), became hits, thus bringing him recognition as a music director at the national level. He sang duet with Sulakshana Pandit named Jana Kahan Hai which gave him recognition as singer. Songs from the films like Aap Ki Khatir, Dil Se Mile Dil, Patita, Lahu Ke Do Rang, Hatya and Ravikant Nagaichs Surakksha 1979 had soft music.

=== 1980s ===
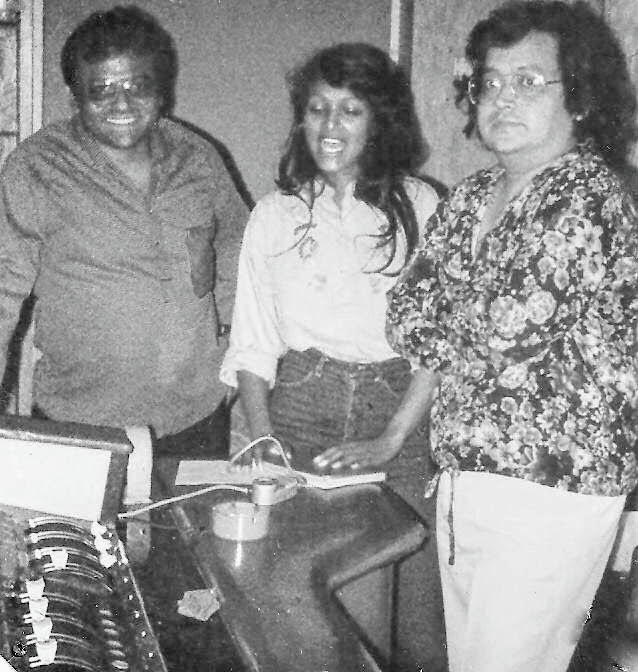
Lahiri (right), with Babbar Subhash and Parvati Khan during the record of "Jimmy Jimmy" for Disco Dancer (1981).

His Disco Dancer (1982) film soundtrack was popular worldwide, particularly in India, the Soviet Union, and China. The soundtrack went Platinum in India, equivalent to 1 million sales, and received a Gold Award in China.

He also composed music for some ghazals, namely "Kisi Nazar Ko Tera Intezaar Aaj Bhi Hai" and "Aawaz Di Hai" for the 1985 film Aitbaar. He also composed melodious songs sung by Kishore Kumar either as duets with Lata Mangeshkar or Asha Bhosle in the films starring Rajesh Khanna in the 80's in hit films like Naya Kadam, Masterji, Aaj Ka M.L.A. Ram Avtar, Bewafai, Maqsad, Suraag, Insaaf Main Karoonga and Adhikar. After success of the film Himmatwala, Bappi regularly composed duets sung by Kishore Kumar for films starring Jeetendra like in Justice Chowdhry, Jaani Dost, Mawali, Haisiyat, Tohfa, Balidaan, Qaidi, Hoshiyaar, Sinhasan, Suhaagan, Majaal, Tamasha, Sone Pe Suhaga and Dharm Adhikari.Bappi Lahiri made a record by composing for 12 super-hit silver jubilee movies starring Jetendra as the lead hero in the period 1983–1985.

Charanjit Singh's album Synthesizing: Ten Ragas to a Disco Beat (1982) influenced Lahiri to experiment with tweaked Roland TB-303 basslines for several Indian disco film songs released in 1983: "Koi Lutera" in Wanted: Dead or Alive, "Aah Ha Oonh Hun" in Do Gulaab, and "Tum Tum Tumba" in Karate. The electronic dance song "Koi Lutera" sung by Asha Bhosle is considered a precursor to acid house, with a tweaked TB-303 bassline, drum machine beats and sound effect samples. A somewhat "techno-sounding interlude" later appeared in Lahiri's song "Kasam Paida Karne Wale Ki" from the film of the same name in 1984.

He entered the Guinness Book of World Records for recording over 180 songs for 33 films in 1986.

=== 1990s–2020s ===
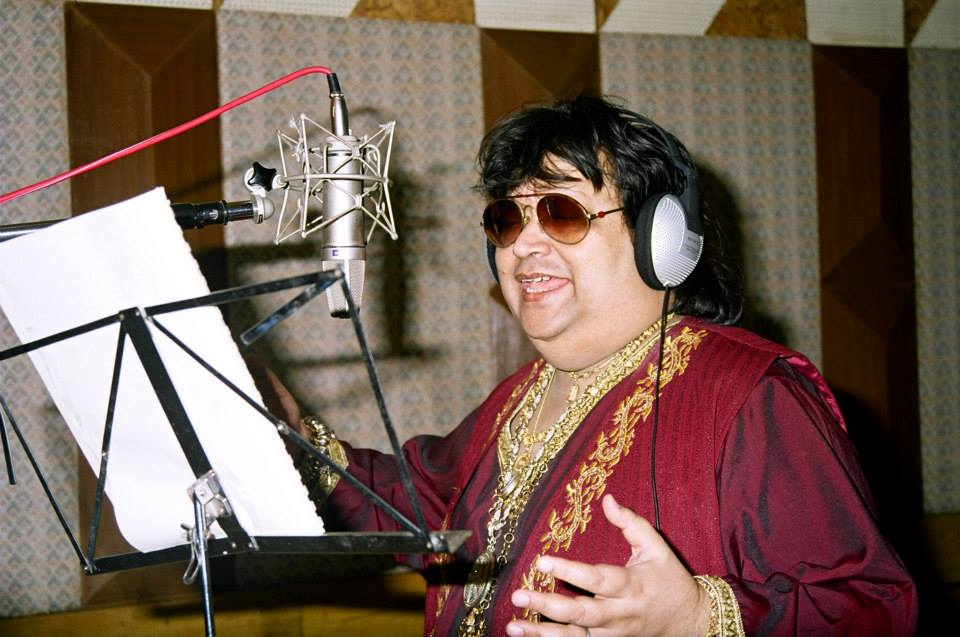
Lahiri at the recording of a song in 2005

Apart from his popular disco-electronic music, Bappi Lahiri was also known for his signature look of his sartorial style that consisted gold chains, golden embellishments, velvety cardigans and sunglasses.

Portions of Lahiri's song "Thoda Resham Lagta Hai" were included in the 2002 song "Addictive" by American R&B singer Truth Hurts. Copyright holders Saregama India, Ltd. sued Interscope Records and its parent company, Universal Music Group for more than $500 million. A Los Angeles federal judge subsequently barred further sales of the CD unless and until Lahiri was listed on the song's credits.

In 2012, his album World Peace, Love & Harmony was among the top five albums being considered for a Grammy nomination but lost. But, he was selected to be a jury member in the Grammy Awards.

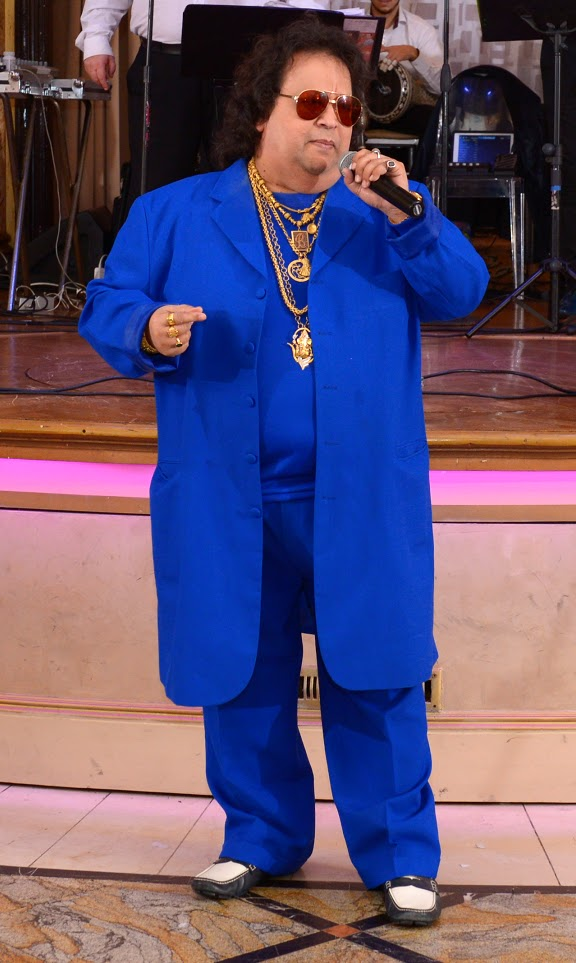
Lahiri performing in 2016

In late 2016, Lahiri voiced the character of Tamatoa in the Hindi-dubbed version of Disney's animated fantasy adventure film Moana; he also composed and sang "Shona" (Gold), the Hindi version of "Shiny". This was his first time dubbing for an animated character, and he also appeared in Ramratan song "Yeh Hai Dance Bar". He won Filmfare Lifetime Achievement Award at 63rd Filmfare Awards.

In 2021, he appeared as a guest judge in musical TV shows such as Sa Re Ga Ma Pa, and Indian Idol.

=== Political ambitions ===
Bappi Lahiri joined the Bharatiya Janata Party on 31 January 2014 in the presence of Rajnath Singh, the then-national President of Bharatiya Janata Party, to contest the 2014 Lok Sabha election. He was made a BJP candidate from Srerampur (Lok Sabha constituency) in 2014, but lost to Kalyan Banerjee.

== Other work ==
=== Acting ===
Year	Film	Role	Notes
1974	Badhti Ka Naam Dadhi	Bhopu	
2009	Main Aurr Mrs Khanna	Victor Sir	
2012	It's Rocking: Dard-E-Disco		
2022	Masaba Masaba Season 2		

=== Dubbing ===
Film title	Actor	Character	Dub language	Original language	Original year release	Dub year release	Notes
Moana	Jemaine Clement	Tamatoa	Hindi	English	2016	2016	
Kingsman: The Golden Circle	Elton John	Himself	Hindi	English	2017	2017	live-action

== Death ==
Bappi Lahiri died of obstructive sleep apnea and post COVID-19 complications in Mumbai, on 15 February 2022 at the age of 69.

== Discography ==
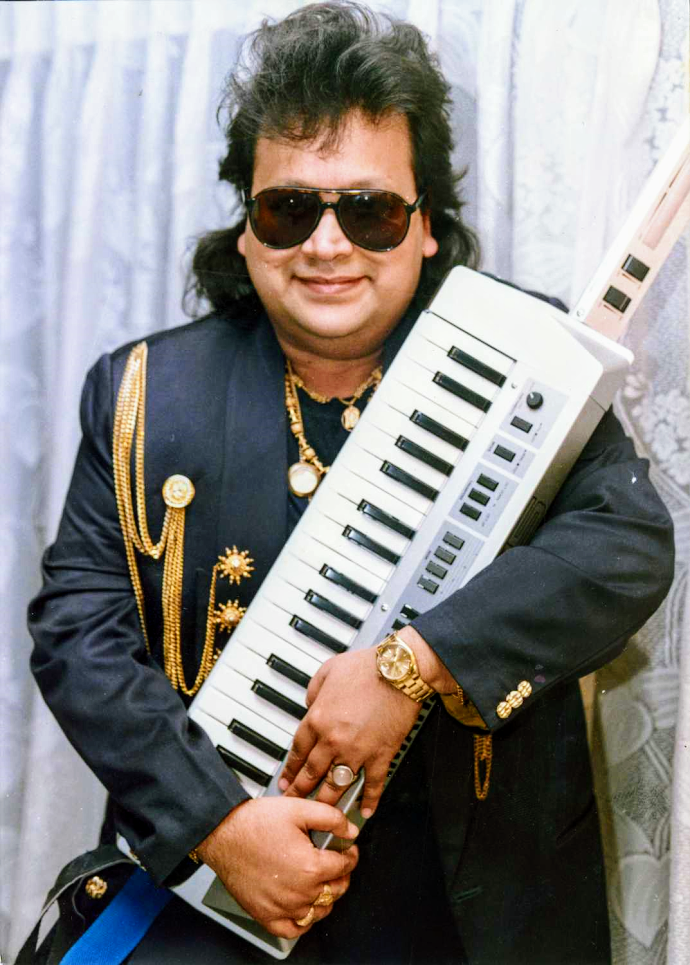
Lahiri in 1995

Bappi Lahiri became popular in the late 1970s-80s and early 1990s for the film soundtracks composed by him such as Naya Kadam, Aangan Ki Kali, Wardat, Disco Dancer, Haathkadi, Namak Halaal, Masterji, Dance Dance, Himmatwala, Justice Chaudhury, Tohfa, Maqsad, Commando, Naukar Biwi Ka, Adhikar and Sharaabi.

He was known for disco-style songs where he brought orchestration and fusion of Indian music with international sounds and youthful upbeat rhythms. Although most of his songs were written for discotheques and dance numbers, there are several melodious songs as well from a list of movies like Chalte Chalte, Zakhmee, Aangan Ki Kali, Patita, Adhikar, Aaj Ka M.L.A Ram Avatar, Laalchi, Aitbaar, Naya Kadam.

Denotes films that have not yet been released

=== Hindi ===
Year	Film	Songs	Notes
1973	Nanha Shikari	"All Songs"	
1973	Charitra	"All Songs"	
1974	Bazar Band Karo	"All Songs"	
1974	Ek Ladki Badnaam Si	"All Songs"	
1975	Zakhmee	"All Songs"	
1976	Chalte Chalte	"All Songs"	
1977	Aap Ki Khatir	"All Songs"	
1978	College Girl (1978 film)	"All Songs	Also Singer
1978	Toote Khilone	"All Songs"	
1979	Aur Kaun?	"All Songs"	
1979	Surakksha	"All Songs"	Also Singer
1979	Aangan Ki Kali	"All Songs"	
1979	Lahu Ke Do Rang	"All Songs"	
1980	Manokamna	"All Songs"	Also Singer
1981	Karwat	All Songs	
1981	Wardat	"All Songs"	Also Singer
1981	Laparwah	"All Songs"	
1981	Jyoti	"All Songs"	
1982	Disco Dancer	"All Songs"	Also Singer
1982	Namak Halaal	"All Songs"	Also Singer
1982	Suraag	"All Songs"	Also Singer
1982	Haathkadi	"All Songs"	
1982	Kisise Na Kehna	All Songs	
1983	Himmatwala	"All Songs"	
1983	Mawaali	"All Songs"	
1983	Naukar Biwi Ka	"All Songs"	Also Singer
1983	Love In Goa	"All Songs" except "Come On Sing"	
1983	Pasand Apni Apni	All Songs	
1984	Maqsad	"All Songs"	
1984	Sharaabi	"All Songs"	
1984	Tohfa	"All Songs"	
1984	Naya Kadam	"All Songs"	
1984	Teri Baahon Mein	"All Songs"	
1984	Kasam Paida Karne Wale Ki	All Songs	Also Singer
1984	Aaj Ka M.L.A. Ram Avtar	All Songs	Also Singer
1984	Gangvaa	All Songs	
1985	Aitbaar	"All Songs"	
1985	Masterji	"All Songs"	
1985	Pataal Bhairavi	"All Songs"	
1985	Bewafai	"All Songs"	
1985	Saaheb	"All Songs"	Also Singer
1985	Geraftaar	"All Songs"	Also Singer
1985	Insaaf Main Karoongaa	"All Songs"	Also Singer
1985	Adventures of Tarzan	"All Songs"	
1985	Adhikar	"All Songs"	
1986	Main Balwaan	"All Songs"	Also Singer
1986	Muddat	"All Songs"	
1986	Ilzaam	"All Songs"	
1986	Dilwala	"All Songs"	
1986	Sheesha	"All Songs"	
1986	Shart	"All Songs"	
1986	Dharma Adhikari	"All Songs"	
1986	Main Balwan	"All Songs"	
1986	Suhagan	"All Songs"	
1986	Kismatwala	"All Songs"	
1986	Locket	"All Songs"	
1986	Shart	"All Songs"	
1986	Insaaf Ki Awaaz	"All Songs"	
1986	Singhasan	"All Songs"	
1986	Mera Dharam	"All Songs"	
1987	Sheela	"All Songs"	Also Singer
1987	Dance Dance	"All Songs"	Also Singer
1987	Aag Hi Aag	"All Songs"	
1987	Satyamev Jayate	"All Songs"	Also Singer
1988	Commando	"All Songs"	
1988	Mera Shikar	"All Songs"	Also Singer
1989	Guru	"All Songs"	Also Singer
1989	Prem Pratigyaa	"All Songs"	Also Singer
1990	Naakabandi	"All Songs"	Also Singer
1990	Ghayal	"All Songs"	
1990	Aaj Ka Arjun	"All Songs"	
1990	Aaj Ke Shahenshah	"All Songs"	
1990	Sailaab	"All Songs"	Along with Aadesh Shrivastava
1990	Thanedaar	"All Songs"	Also Singer
1991	Vishkanya	"All Songs"	
1991	Farishtay	"All Songs"	
1991	Dushman Devta	"All Songs"	
1991	Swarg Jaisaa Ghar	"All Songs"	
1991	Afsana Pyar Ka	"All Songs"	
1991	Pratikar	"All Songs"	Also Singer
1991	Numbri Aadmi	"All Songs"	
1991	Sau Crore	"All Songs"	
1991	First Love Letter	"All Songs"	
1992	Shola Aur Shabnam	"All Songs"	
1992	Zindagi Ek Juaa	"All Songs"	
1992	Police Aur Mujrim	"All Songs"	
1992	Geet	"All Songs"	
1992	Tyagi	"All Songs"	Also Singer
1992	Touhean	"All Songs"	
1993	Dalaal	"All Songs"	Also Singer
1993	Aankhen	"All Songs"	Also Singer
1993	Geetanjali	"All Songs"	
1994	Amaanat	"All Songs"	
1995	Rock Dancer	"All Songs"	Also Singer
1995	Diya Aur Toofan	"All Songs"	
1996	Dil Ke Jharoke Main	"All Songs"	
1996	Rangbaaz	"All Songs"	Also Singer
1996	Bal Bramhachari	"All Songs"	
1996	Hum Sab Chor Hain	"All Songs"	
1997	Nirnayak	"All Songs"	Also Singer
1997	Dharma Karma	"All Songs"	Also Singer
1998	Military Raaj	"All Songs"	Also Singer
1999	Aaya Toofan	"All Songs"	Also Singer
1999	Benaam	"All Songs"	
2000	Justice Chowdhary	"All Songs"	
2006	Taxi No. 9211	"Bumbai Nagariya"	Singer
2008	Mudrank	"All Songs"	Also Singer
2008	C Kkompany	"Khokha", "Jaane Kya Ho Gaya Mujhko"	
2008	Chandni Chowk to China	"India Se Aaya Tera Dost (Aap Ki Khatir)"	
2009	Jai Veeru	"All Songs"	
2010	Love.com	"Rabba Tu Pyar Dede"	
2011	The Dirty Picture	"Ooh La La"	As Singer
2013	Jolly LLB	"Mere Toh L Lag Gaye" and "L Lag Gaye 2"	As Singer
2013	Himmatwala	"Thank God It's Friday"	Uncredited
2014	Gunday	"Tune Maari Entriyaan", "Assalaam-E-Ishqum"	As Singer
2014	Main Aur Mr. Riight	"All Songs"	
2015	Hunterrr	"Hunterrr 303"	As Singer
2017	Badrinath Ki Dulhania	"Tamma Tamma Song"	Singer & Original Composer
2017	Ittefaq	"Ittefaq Se (Raat Baaki)"	Original Composer
2018	3rd Eye		
2018	Mausam Ikrar Ke Do Pal Pyaar Ke	All Songs	Music Director
2019	Why Cheat India	"Dil Mein Ho Tum"	Original Music Director
2020	Shubh Mangal Zyada Saavdhan	"Areey Pyar Kar Le"	Singer and original music director
2020	Baaghi 3	"Bhankas"	Singer and original music director
2022	Dhokha: Round D Corner	"Mere Dil Gaaye Ja" (Zooby Zooby)	Singer and original music director
2026	Dhurandhar: The Revenge	"Tamma Tamma Song"	Singer & Original Composer

=== Telugu ===
Year	Film	Notes
1986	Simhasanam	
1987	Thene Manasulu	
1987	Trimurtulu	
1987	Sankharavam	
1987	Samrat	
1988	Collector Vijaya	
1988	Manmadha Saamrajyam	
1989	State Rowdy	
1990	Chinna	
1990	Chinna Kodalu	
1991	Indra Bhavanam	
1991	Gang Leader	
1991	Rowdy Gaari Pellam	
1991	Rowdy Alludu	
1992	Donga Police	
1992	Raktha Tharpanam	
1992	Rowdy Inspector	
1992	Brahma	
1993	Nippu Ravva	
1993	Rowdy Rajakeeyam	
1995	Big Boss	
1995	Muddayi Muddugumma	
1995	Khaidi Inspector	
1995	Punya Bhoomi Naa Desam	
2013	Action 3D	Co-composed with his son Bappa Lahiri
2019	Namaste Nestama	
2020	Disco Raja	Singer

=== Bengali ===
Year	Film	Notes
1969	Daadu	Only for the song "Ami Pradip Er Niche"
1972	Janatar Adalat	
1981	Ogo Bodhu Shundori	Also Singer
1987	Guru Dakshina	Also Singer
1987	Amar Sangi	Also Singer
1989	Aamar Tumi	Also Singer
1989	Amar Prem	Also Singer
1989	Asha O Bhalobasha	Also Singer
1989	Pronomi Tomay	Also Singer
1989	Chokher Aloye	Also Singer
1990	Bolidan	Features popular song by Usha Uthup, "Uri Uri Baba"
1990	Mandira	Also Singer
1990	Badnam	Also Singer
1992	Priya	
1992	Raktelekha	Also Singer
1992	Tomar Naam Likhe Debo	Also Singer
1994	Neelanjana	Also Singer

=== Kannada ===
- Africadalli Sheela (1986)
- Krishna Nee Begane Baro (1986)
- Guru (1989)
- Police Matthu Dada (1991)
- Love in Mandya (2014) – singer, "Current Hodha Timealli"

=== Tamil ===
- Apoorva Sahodarigal (1983)
- Paadum Vaanampadi (1985)
- Kizhakku Africavil Sheela (1987)
- Rocky: The Revenge (2019)

=== Other languages ===
- Phir Janam Lenge Hum/Janam Janam Na Saathi (1977) – Hindi-Gujarati
- Habiba (1988) – English
- Michha Maya Sansara (1989) – Odia
- Dokyala Taap Nahi (1990) – Marathi
- The Good Boys (1997) – Malayalam
- Luckee (2019) – Marathi, singer

== Awards ==
Year	Award	Category	Nominated work	Result	Ref.
1982	Filmfare Awards	Best Music Director	Armaan	Nominated	
1983	Filmfare Awards	Best Music Director	Namak Halaal	Nominated	
1985	Filmfare Awards	Best Music Director	Sharaabi	Won	
1985	Filmfare Awards	Best Music Director	Kasam Paida Karne Wale Ki	Nominated	
1985	Filmfare Awards	Best Music Director	Tohfa	Nominated	
1991	Filmfare Awards	Best Music Director	Aaj Ka Arjun	Nominated	
2018	Filmfare Awards	Lifetime Achievement Award		Won	
2012	Mirchi Music Awards	Best Item Song of the Year	"Ooh La La" (From The Dirty Picture)	Won	

=== Honours ===
- 2017 – Banga Bhushan Civilian Honour by Government of West Bengal

== Legacy ==
Composer Bappi Lahiri's discarded disco track Zindagi Meri Dance Dance was left out of the Babbar Subhash film Dance Dance although it featured on the vinyl album release at the time. It was re-discovered and had a second lease of life in director Ashim Ahluwalia's 2017 gangster film Daddy starring Arjun Rampal. The re-release of the song was a huge success, becoming one of the top tracks of the year.

Ahluwalia wanted an authentic 80s Bappi Lahiri sound and not an overproduced remix. Norwegian producer Olefonken reworked the song to be more dynamic for contemporary sound systems but kept many of the original elements including the original vocals of Alisha Chinai and Vijay Benedict as well as the original synth and drum machines. The choreographer of Ahluwalia's first film Miss Lovely, was the same Kamal Nath who had also worked on B. Subhash's disco film Dance Dance and Commando starring Mithun Chakraborty, both of which feature Bappi Lahiri soundtracks.

However, he has also been accused of plagiarism for having adapted or copied melodies and rhythms from Western pop and disco tracks without formal credit or licensing, including some of his most famous songs, such as Disco Dancer's "Jimmy Jimmy Jimmy Aaja", released in 1982 and taken from the 1980 song "You're OK" by French group Ottawan.

== See also ==
- List of Indian film music directors
