= House dance =

Freestyle street and social dance

House dance is a freestyle street dance and social dance that has roots in the underground house music scene of Chicago and New York. It is typically danced to loud and bass-heavy electronic dance music provided by DJs in nightclubs or at raves.

== Elements and characteristics ==
The main elements of House dance include "jacking", "footwork", and "lofting". The element of "jacking", or the "jack", – an ecstatic, sex-driven rippling movement of the torso – is the most famous dance move associated with early house music. It has found its way onto numerous record titles like the Jack Trax EP by Chip E. (1985), "Jack'n the House" (1985) by Farley "Jackmaster" Funk (1985), "Jack Your Body" by Steve "Silk" Hurley (1986), or "Jack to the Sound of the Underground" by Fast Eddie (1988).

Jacking style involves the whole body in energetic, often ecstatic movements, going beyond traditional dance movements. Reynolds links 'jacking' to both the 'jerk' movement and a collective, intense dance style, resembling a robot in a charged dance. In house music's more sexually charged tracks, 'jacking' often happens during climactic energy peaks, where the beat becomes a continuous, sexually charged motif, driving the audience to heightened excitement. This results in a collective, almost impersonal experience, where dancers become part of a unified group, often showcasing extravagant identity transformations. The circle that is created when dancing is one of the most important structural elements both in the liminal and spontaneous communities of the club, creating essential interactions between dancers. House dance movements carry spiritual and political meanings, creating a sense of unity and connection through the genre's energy. House dance is often improvised and emphasizes fast and complex foot-oriented steps combined with fluid movements in the torso, as well as floor work. There is an emphasis on the subtle rhythms and riffs of the music, and the footwork follows them closely.

== Historical Background ==
House dance is historically connected to the improvisational dancing practice in New York underground disco scene during the 1970s. At venues such as the Loft and the Sanctuary played a significant role in developing a dance culture, defying a fixed-partner dancing. Black social dances like the Lindy Hop also contributed to the shift towards improvisational dancing. Dancers could move independently while interacting with others across the dance floor and making the wider crowd a partner. According to historian Tim Lawrence, these dance practices continued beyond the commercial decline of disco and survived in club cultures centered on house, techno, and garage. During the early 1980s, House music emerged from disco-related musical practices. It emphasized continuous rhythmic music, individual movement, and creative interaction.

== Notable dancers ==
In the early progressions of the dance, there were hundreds of phenomenal dancers that were key in its progression in this social dance scene. However, out of the many there were few instrumental in the introduction of house dance culture across the globe. Some of these dancers are Ejoe Wilson, Brian "Footwork" Green, Tony McGregor, Marjory Smarth, Caleaf Sellers, "Brooklyn" Terry Wright, Kim D. Holmes, Shannon Mabra, Tony "Sekou" Williams, Shannon Selby (aka Shan S), Voodoo Ray, and others.

In Los Angeles, as seen in the local television series, "Pump It Up" hosted by Dee Barnes, the "underground" house dance episode, co-hosted by Stefan of L.A. Posse, recognizes some of the following to be instrumental to the house dance culture in LA: The Scheme Team, Club House, L.A. Posse, Just As Hard, The Groovers, and the Soul Brothers.

== Steps ==
- African Step
- No-stuffing: inspirado no balé, é um movimento que envolve a transferência de peso entre os pés com passos rápidos. Ele traz um toque de sofisticação e leveza à dança;
- Shuffle: consiste em deslizar os pés no chão rapidamente e em sequencia, usado para criar efeitos visuais e adicionar ritmo à performance.
- Pas de bourré
- Side Walk
- Salsa Step
- Salsa hop
- The Step Up
- Side wings
- Stomp
- Snake
- Scribble Foot
- Somping
- Swirl
- Chase
- Cross roads
- Cross walk
- Cross step
- Criss Cross
- Tip Tap Toe
- Twist
- Compass turn
- Lotus
- The Loose Leg
- The Train
- Dolphin Dive
- Heel Step
- Heel Toe
- Hurdle
- Jack Jumps
- Jack in box
- Pivot Step
- Pas De Bourree
- Roger Rabbit
- Farmer
- Floor Spin
- Feel/Groove
- Gallop
- Ground Sweep
- Knee Drop

== Competitions and festivals ==
- House Dance International: International competition and festival focusing on House Dance (USA)
- Juste Debout: Urban dance competition and festival, including House Dance as one major part of the event (France)
- SDK Europe: Competition focusing on Hip Hop New Style, House Dance, Popping and Locking (Czech Republic)
- House Dance Europe (Italy)
- WDC (World Dance Colosseum) (Japan)
- HOUSEDANCEFOREVER: International House Dance battle (Netherlands)
- House Dance Conference (USA)
