= I Can't Turn Around =

Single by J.M. Silk

from the album Hold on to Your Dream
- B-side: "Remix"
- Released: December 1986
- Recorded: 1986
- Genre: Chicago house
- Length: 3:57
- Label: RCA Records
- Songwriter(s): Isaac Hayes

Steve "Silk" Hurley singles chronology
"Shadows of Your Love" (1986)	"I Can't Turn Around" (1986)	"Jack Your Body" (1986)

Alternative cover

"I Can't Turn Around" is a song written and originally performed by soul singer Isaac Hayes as the lead single from his 1975 album Chocolate Chip.

== House music cover versions ==
In 1986, a house music cover of the song by J.M. Silk reached number one on the U.S. Billboard Hot Dance Music/Club Play chart with lead vocals performed by Keith Nunnally. The single was the only US dance number one for J.M. Silk. It did also enter the UK singles chart in October 1986, peaking at number sixty-two, but was strongly outsold there by Farley "Jackmaster" Funk's reworked version of the song, entitled "Love Can't Turn Around". Farley's version copied elements of Hurley's arrangement with new lyrics by Vince Lawrence and vocals performed by Darryl Pandy, peaking at number ten in UK Top 75 and number fifteen on the US Dance chart.

== Official versions ==
- "I Can't Turn Around (LP Version)" - 3:57
- "I Can't Turn Around (House Mix)" - 7:35
- "I Can't Turn Around (Radio Mix)" - 3:23
- "I Can't Turn Around (House of Trix Mix)" - 8:59
- "I Can't Turn Around (Insane Mix)" - 4:08

== Charts and sales ==
Chart (1986)	Peak position
UK Singles Chart	62
U.S. Billboard Hot Dance Music/Club Play	1
U.S. Billboard Hot Dance Music/Maxi-Singles Sales	9

== See also ==
- List of number-one dance hits (United States)
- List of artists who reached number one on the US Dance chart
