= Work It Out (Steve "Silk" Hurley song) =

Single by Steve "Silk" Hurley featuring M. Doc

from the album Work It Out Compilation
- B-side: "Remix"
- Released: 1989
- Recorded: 1989
- Genre: Chicago house
- Length: 4:23
- Label: Atlantic
- Songwriter(s): Steve Hurley
- Producer(s): Steve "Silk" Hurley; Frank Rodrigo

Steve "Silk" Hurley singles chronology
"It's Percussion" (1988)	"Work It Out" (1989)	"Chain of Fools" (1989)

Alternative cover

"Work It Out" is a house music song by Chicago based producer Steve "Silk" Hurley featuring rap vocals by M. Doc.

== Release ==
The song was released on Atlantic Records in 1989 as the lead single taken from Hurley's Work It Out Compilation, which featured additional seven tracks, partially recorded in collaboration with Jamie Principle. The 12" release contained a short radio edit, the full album version, an extended remix and two acid house versions of the song.

== Credits and personnel ==
- Steve Hurley - writer, producer, mix, engineer, edit
- M-Doc - featured artist
- Larry Sturm - engineer
- Frank Rodrigo - executive producer

== Success ==
On the U.S. Billboard Hot Dance Music/Club Play the single peaked at number three.

== Official versions ==
- "Work It Out (LP Version)" - 5:07
- "Work It Out (Radio Edit" - 4:23
- "Work It Out (Acid Mix)" - 6:10
- "Work It Out (Acid Dub)" - 4:55
- "Work It Out (Extended Remix)" - 6:20

== Charts and sales ==
=== Peak positions ===
Chart (1989)	Peak position
U.S. Billboard Hot Dance Music/Club Play	3
