= The Word Is Love (Say the Word) =

Single by Steve "Silk" Hurley & The Voices of Life featuring Sharon Pass
- B-side: "Remix"
- Released: 1997
- Recorded: 1997
- Genre: Chicago house
- Length: 3:32
- Label: Silk; AM:PM; La Belle Noire; Vendetta; D:vision; Club Tools; Feel the Rhythm; Tinted
- Songwriter(s): Steve Hurley; M-Doc
- Producer(s): Steve "Silk" Hurley; Kelly G

Steve "Silk" Hurley singles chronology
"Melody" (1992)	"The Word Is Love" (1997)	"Dubs From The Dungeon Vol.1" (2000)

Alternative cover

"The Word Is Love (Say The Word)" is a 1997 house music song by Steve "Silk" Hurley, released under the alias Steve "Silk" Hurley & The Voices of Life, featuring vocals by Sharon Pass.

== Background ==
Apart from others record companies, the single was released on the producer's own label Silk Entertainment in several editions. The composition written by Hurley himself along with M-Doc didn't catch much attention in US. In the overseas, it scored a modest success on the UK Singles Chart, where the single peaked at number twenty-six in March 1998.

== Credits and personnel ==
- Steve Hurley – writer, producer, remix
- M-Doc – writer
- Sharon Pass – lead vocal
- Jivan Diwano – keyboards
- Anthony Higgins – remix
- Four Shades – remix
- Jon Hardy – remix
- Nick Law – remix
- Simon Lewicki – remix
- Sushi Twins – remix
- Tim McGee – remix
- Wicked Peach – remix
- Frankie Feliciano – remix
- Mousse T. – remix
- Groovehunter – remix
- Kelly G – remix, additional producer
- Jerome Brown – bass
- Steve Turner – bass
- Steve Weeder – engineer

== Official versions ==
- "The Word Is Love (7" Radio Edit)" – 4:00
- "The Word Is Love (Silk's Radio Anthem)" – 3:32
- "The Word Is Love (Silk's Anthem of Life)" – 8:58
- "The Word Is Love (Silk's Anthem of Life Instrumental)" – 6:48
- "The Word Is Love (Silk's Original of Life)" – 5:56
- "The Word Is Love (Kelly "Lets You Go" Radio Edit)" – 3:08
- "The Word Is Love (Kelly "Lets You Go" Mix)" – 7:13
- "The Word Is Love (Kelly G Bump 'N' Say Mix)" – 6:10
- "The Word Is Love (Kelly G's Bump N' Love Mix)" – 7:38
- "The Word Is Love (Kelly G. Dub)" – 5:21
- "The Word Is Love (Kelly G "Say It" Underground Mix)"
- "The Word Is Love (Mousse T's Kinda Deep Mix)" – 6:43
- "The Word Is Love (Mousse T.'s Kinda Dope Mix)" – 9:01
- "The Word Is Love (Mousse T's Kinda Dope Dub)" – 6:20
- "The Word Is Love (Mousse T's for the Heads Mix)" – 7:53
- "The Word Is Love (Mousse T's Kinda Deep Instrumental)" – 6:42
- "The Word Is Love (Mousse T's For The Heads Instrumental)" – 7:53
- "The Word Is Love (Mood II Swing Dub)" – 7:31
- "The Word Is Love (Four Shades Dub)" – 6:26
- "The Word Is Love (Sushi Twins' Dirty Phunkofile Mix)" – 6:53
- "The Word Is Love (Wicked Peach Mix)" – 5:56
- "The Word Is Love (Frankie Feliciano's Recanstruction Vocal Mix)" – 9:47
- "The Word Is Love (Frankie Feliciano's Recanstruction Instrumental)"
- "The Word Is Love (Unreleased Mix)" – 6:08
- "The Word Is Love (Say The Word) (Groovehunter Vocal Mix)"
- "The Word Is Love (Say The Word) (Groovehunter Dub Mix)"

== Charts ==
Chart (1998)	Peak position
Italian Singles Chart	15
UK Singles Chart	26

== See also ==
- List of artists who reached number one on the U.S. Dance Club Songs chart
