= Heart of Passion =

Single by J.M. Silk

from the album Hold on to Your Dream
- B-side: "I Can't Turn Around"
- Released: 1987
- Recorded: 1986
- Genre: Chicago house
- Length: 4:15
- Label: RCA Records
- Songwriter(s): Keith Nunnally; Steve Hurley
- Producer(s): Steve "Silk" Hurley; Phil Balsano

Steve "Silk" Hurley singles chronology
"She's So Far Away" (1987)	"Heart of Passion" (1987)	"Cry of the Lonely" (1987)

"Heart of Passion" is a song by J.M. Silk taken from the album Hold on to Your Dream, which was released on RCA Records, in 1987.

The composition was written by Keith Nunnally and Steve "Silk" Hurley. B-side of the single featured Isaac Hayes' song "I Can't Turn Around (originally recorded for his 1975 album) that topped the US Dance chart, as well as charted in UK at number sixty-two.

== Credits and personnel ==
- Keith Nunnally - lead vocal, writer
- Steve Hurley - writer, producer, mix
- Larry Sturm - engineer, mix
- Phil Balsano - producer

"I Can't Turn Around"

- Steve Hurley - producer
- Isaac Hayes - writer
- Matt Warren - mix

== Official versions ==
- "Heart of Passion (Album Version)" - 4:15

== See also ==
- List of artists who reached number one on the US Dance chart
