= Jacking (dance) =

Freestyle dance move

Jacking, Jackin’, or the jack is a freestyle dance move in which the dancer ripples their torso back and forth in an undulating motion. It emerged within the context of Chicago house music in the 1980s.

== Origins and interpretations ==
The style is said to have developed in Chicago nightclubs like the Warehouse and the Power Plant, where house pioneer Frankie Knuckles was resident DJ, and Ron Hardy's Music Box, during the early 1980s.

Music journalist Simon Reynolds has argued that just as house music evolved from disco music (among other influences – see House music), jacking evolved from the expressiveness of disco dancing. Even more than disco, house music endorsed an “abandonment of subjectivity and self-will”, promoting the “ecstasy of being enthralled by the beat”. He sees jacking as a reflection of this abandonment of subjectivity:

“In disco, dance had gradually shed its role as courtship ritual and opened up into unpaired freestyle self-expression. Jacking took this to the next stage, replacing pelvic thrust and booty shake with a whole-body frenzy of polymorphously perverse tics and convulsive pogo-ing.” — Simon Reynolds: Generation Ecstasy, 1999, p. 29

A similar account on the sexual content of jacking was suggested by Barry Walters in his 1986 article on house music in SPIN magazine:

“House lyrical content consists of dancing and sex. ‘Jacking your body’ (moving up and down on a dance floor) can easily slide into sex. [...] Like the incessantly booming beat, house sexuality is reduced to absurdly aggressive basics, but not without a self-mocking playfulness and an underlying message of liberation.” — Barry Walters: Burning Down the House, 1986

DJ and record producer Chip E. also explains the body movements in jacking with a reference to sexuality:

“Some of the music is explicitly sexual because some of the individuals are explicitly sexual. House is suited for the way people dance now, which is like being in bed but standing up. ‘Jacking’ is to house as ‘boogying’ was to disco.” — Chip E., quoted by Walters, Burning Down the House, 1986

== "Jackin' house" as a style of music ==
The terms "jacking", "jackin'", or "jack" found their way into numerous titles of early house music records, such as the Jack Trax EP by Chip E. (1985), "Jack'n the House" (1985) by Farley "Jackmaster" Funk (1985), "Jack Your Body" by Steve "Silk" Hurley (1986), "The Jack That House Built" by Jack 'n' Chill (1987), or "Jack to the Sound of the Underground" by Hithouse (1988).

The term is also transferred to certain styles of house music called "jackin' house".

== See also ==
- House dance
