= She's So Far Away =

Single by J.M. Silk

from the album Hold on to Your Dream
- B-side: Remix; "Jack Your Body"
- Released: 1987
- Recorded: 1986
- Genre: Chicago house
- Length: 3:45
- Label: RCA
- Songwriter(s): Keith Nunnally
- Producer(s): Steve Hurley; Larry Sturm; Phil Balsano

Steve "Silk" Hurley singles chronology
"Let the Music Take Control" (1987)	"She's So Far Away" (1987)	"Heart of Passion" (1987)

"She's So Far Away" is a song by J.M. Silk, taken from the album Hold on to Your Dream, which was released in 1987 on RCA Records.

The single was written by Keith Nunnally, and it peaked in the UK Singles Chart at number eighty. On B-side of the release appeared a remix of their UK number one hit, "Jack Your Body".

== Credits and personnel ==
- Keith Nunnally – lead vocal, writer
- Steve Hurley – producer
- Larry Sturm – producer
- Phil Balsano – producer
- Crocodile – art work

== Official versions ==
- "She's So Far Away (LP Version)" – 3:45
- "She's So Far Away (Single Mix)" – 7:11

== Charts ==
Chart (1987)	Peak position
UK Singles Chart	80

== See also ==
- List of artists who reached number one on the US Dance chart
