= Let the Music Take Control =

Single by J.M. Silk

from the album Hold on to Your Dream
- B-side: "Remix"
- Released: 1987
- Recorded: 1986
- Genre: Chicago house
- Length: 3:55
- Label: RCA Records
- Songwriter(s): Keith Nunnally; Steve Hurley
- Producer(s): Steve "Silk" Hurley; Phil Balsano

Steve "Silk" Hurley singles chronology
"Jack Your Body" (1986)	"Let the Music Take Control" (1987)	"She's So Far Away" (1987)

Alternative cover

"Let the Music Take Control" is a song by J.M. Silk, that was released as their fifth single, on RCA Records in 1987.

The song written by Steve "Silk" Hurley and Keith Nunnally peaked at number two in the US Dance chart in 1987, reaching its top in UK at number forty-seven.

== Credits and personnel ==
- Keith Nunnally - lead vocal, writer
- Steve Hurley - writer, producer, mix
- Larry Sturm - mix
- Phil Balsano - producer

== Official versions ==
- "Let The Music Take Control (LP Version)" - 3:55
- "Let The Music Take Control (House Mix)" - 6:10
- "Let The Music Take Control (Radio Edit)" - 4:02
- "Let The Music Take Control (House of Trix Mix)" - 8:30
- "Let The Music Take Control (Insaneappella)" - 5:30

== Charts and sales ==
=== Peak positions ===
Chart (1987)	Peak position
UK Singles Chart	47
U.S. Billboard Hot Dance Music/Club Play	2

== See also ==
- List of artists who reached number one on the US Dance chart
