= Love Can't Turn Around =

Single by Farley "Jackmaster" Funk and Jesse Saunders featuring Darryl Pandy
- Released: 1986
- Genre: House; Chicago house; diva house
- Length: 7:26 (club mix)
- Label: EMI
- Songwriters: J. M. Funk; V. Lawrence
- Producers: Brothers by Music; J. M. Funk; Jesse Saunders

Music video
- "Love Can't Turn Around" on YouTube

"Love Can't Turn Around" is a 1986 Chicago house song by American musicians, DJs and record producers Farley Keith Williams a.k.a. Farley "Jackmaster" Funk and Jesse Saunders featuring vocalist Darryl Pandy. It holds an important place in the history of house music as the first record in that genre to cross over from the US clubs to the UK Singles Chart.

== History ==
=== "I Can't Turn Around" by Isaac Hayes (1975) ===
The song's origin was "I Can't Turn Around", the lead single from Isaac Hayes' 1975 album Chocolate Chip. This album was notable for being the first on which Hayes moved on from funk to embrace the then-fashionable disco sound. Hayes' original version remained a club favourite for many years and was often played at the Warehouse, the influential Chicago nightclub which was the focus of the house music scene in the early 1980s.

=== "I Can't Turn Around" by Steve "Silk" Hurley (1986) ===
In 1986, Steve "Silk" Hurley, working under the name J.M. Silk, recorded a house version of the song with vocalist Keith Nunnally, which reached number one on Billboard magazine's Hot Dance Club Play chart.

=== "Love Can't Turn Around" by Farley "Jackmaster" Funk (1986) ===
Hearing Steve Hurley's version of the song, Farley "Jackmaster" Funk, who was living with Hurley at the time, teamed up with producer Jesse Saunders to make his own version. Keeping some of Hurley's instrumental arrangement and the bassline riff from Hayes' original, Farley changed the hook line from "I Can't Turn Around" to "Love Can't Turn Around" and dropped the rest of Hayes' original lyric, substituting new words by Vince Lawrence. In some versions, for example the "Vocal Club" version and the radio edit, he also inserted a chorus section sung by female vocalists, and a synthesizer played piano melody.

The lead vocals on Farley's version were performed by Darryl Pandy, who had a Broadway and opera background and been a lead performer with the choir of Chicago's Church of Universal Awareness. Pandy also performed the song in the official music video and did a "flamboyant performance" on the British TV show Top of the Pops that made him famous. Pandy's performance can be heard best and most extensively on the "Vocal Club Mix", the "Houseappella" and the "Dub Can' Turn Around" versions of the song.

Farley's record was a club hit, but also crossed over into the mainstream in the UK, where it was released by London Records. The track entered the UK Singles Chart in the week ending August 27, 1986, and peaked at number 10 five weeks later.

At the time, writing credits were given to Farley Keith and Vince Lawrence, though it was later agreed through a deal with Universal Music that Hayes' song was the inspiration, and it is now officially credited to Hayes. Following the success of Farley's "Love Can't Turn Around", J.M. Silk's version of "I Can't Turn Around" also charted in the UK, reaching a peak of number 62.

In 1996, Farley's version was re-released in the UK, and peaked at number No. 40.

== Impact and legacy ==
In 1994, French DJ Laurent Garnier named "Love Can't Turn Around" one of his favorites of all time, saying, "Mike Pickering played it at the Hacienda in early '87 — the beginning of house music in England. It was the first house track I heard, it introduced me to house music and it changed my life." In 2014, Fact ranked it number seven in their list of "21 Diva-House Belters That Still Sound Incredible". Same year, Rolling Stone magazine featured the song in their "20 Best Chicago House Records" list, writing, "This track is the result of a musical metamorphosis. It started with the Isaac Hayes 1975 original, 'I Can't Turn Around'. Steve "Silk" Hurley then re-recorded it as a house tune with vocalist Keith Nunnally — but this further transposed and reinterpreted version was the one that really took off. And how could it not? The robust, silky vocals of the late, great Darryl Pandy here are instant sunshine."

In 2015, Time Out magazine ranked it number 13 in their list of "The 20 Best House Tracks Ever", saying, "Originally a riff on a proto-house classic, Isaac Hayes's 1975 disco foray 'I Can't Turn Around', this collaboration between turbo-lunged singer Darryl Pandy and Farley Keith blew the roof off house music at the time. It still has the distinction of being a true crossover hit that's maintained its dancefloor appeal decades on." In 2024, Classic Pop ranked "Love Can't Turn Around" number 12 in their "Top 20 80s House Hits". In 2025, Billboard magazine ranked it number 16 in their list of "The 50 Best House Songs of All Time".
