= Music Is the Key (Steve "Silk" Hurley song) =

Single by J.M. Silk

from the album The House Sound of Chicago
- B-side: "Remix"
- Released: July 1985
- Recorded: 1985
- Genre: Chicago house
- Length: 5:45
- Label: D.J. International; Rams Horn
- Songwriter(s): Steve Hurley
- Producer(s): J.M. Silk; Rocky Jones

Steve "Silk" Hurley singles chronology
"Music Is the Key" (1985)	"Shadows of Your Love" (1986)

Alternative cover

"Music Is the Key" is the debut single by J.M. Silk, and the first release issued on D.J. International Records in 1985.

The song was written by Steve "Silk" Hurley and successfully entered the US Dance chart, where it climbed to number 9, while scoring at number 18 for U.S. Maxi-Singles Sale.

== Credits and personnel ==
- Keith Nunnally – lead vocal
- Steve Hurley – writer
- J.M. Silk – producer, mix
- Farley "Jack Master" Funk – mix
- Rocky Jones – producer

== Official versions ==
- "Music Is The Key (House Key)" – 9:15
- "Music Is The Key (Basement Key)" – 5:45
- "Music Is The Key (Radio Version)" – 5:50
- "Music Is The Key (Percussapella Key)" – 7:35

== Charts ==
=== Weekly charts ===
Chart (1986)	Peak position
U.S. Billboard Hot Dance Music/Club Play	9
U.S. Billboard Hot Dance Music/Maxi-Singles Sales	18

== See also ==
- List of artists who reached number one on the US Dance chart
