= Cry of the Lonely =

Single by J.M. Silk

from the album Hold on to Your Dream
- B-side: "Remix"
- Released: 1987
- Recorded: 1986
- Genre: Chicago house
- Length: 4:44
- Label: RCA Records
- Songwriter(s): Keith Nunnally; Steve Hurley
- Producer(s): Steve "Silk" Hurley; Larry Sturm; Phil Balsano

Steve "Silk" Hurley singles chronology
"Heart of Passion" (1987)	"Cry of the Lonely" (1987)	"All in Vain" (1988)

Alternative cover

"Cry of the Lonely" is a song by J.M. Silk, released as the final single taken from the album Hold on to Your Dream issued on RCA Records, in 1987.

The composition was written by Keith Nunnally and Steve "Silk" Hurley, and it reached at number fifty on the US Dance chart.

== Credits and personnel ==
- Keith Nunnally - lead vocal, writer
- Steve Hurley - writer, producer, mix
- Larry Sturm - producer, engineer
- Phil Balsano - producer
- Freddy Bastone - mix
- Chep Nanez - edits

== Official versions ==
- "Cry of The Lonely (Radio Edit) - 4:10
- "Cry of The Lonely (LP Version)" - 4:44
- "Cry of The Lonely (Club-House Mix)" - 7:45
- "Cry of The Lonely (Dub-House Mix)" - 7:20
- "Cry of The Lonely (House-Of-Trix Mix) - 9:52

== Charts and sales ==
=== Peak positions ===
Chart (1987)	Peak position
U.S. Billboard Hot Dance Music/Club Play	50

== See also ==
- List of artists who reached number one on the US Dance chart
