= Vince Lawrence =

American record producer

Vince Lawrence (born January 6, 1964, Chicago, Illinois, United States) is an American dance music record producer, businessman and is one of the leading innovators of the genre of music called house music. Industry insiders recognize Lawrence as co-author of "On and On", the first recording officially designated "house music". He worked with Jesse Saunders in the initial creation of Jes Say Records, designing its logo by hand. He served as head of marketing and was the lyric writer for "Funk U Up" (the first House track to ever make it onto the Billboard charts), "Undercover" by Dr. Derelict, "Real Love", and many other songs released in the label's heyday. He also co-authored "Love Can't Turn Around", which featured Daryl Pandy and reached No. 10 in the UK Singles Chart in 1986, starting the house music revolution in the UK. He organized Trax Records, a Chicago house label. He is the founder of Slang MusicGroup, which has received numerous gold and platinum awards for their contributions.

== Early years ==
In his early years, Lawrence's father worked with Eddie Thomas of Curtom Records. Eddie managed several soul and funk acts, one of which was Captain Sky, who was a Funk artist that played on Soul Train and other shows. One year, Vince got to go on tour with the musicians. He did their pyrotechnician work and watched the musician playing the synthesizers and keyboards. As a result, he decided to learn a little bit about his synthesizers and got a job as an usher at Comiskey Park to pay for them. One night he was on duty turned out to be the infamous Disco Demolition Night.

After becoming the victim of a hate crime, Lawrence settled out of court for $5000 with a view to buying his first synthesizers

He saved up enough money to buy a small synthesizer, a Moog Prodigy. Lawrence started his own band called Z Factor with Fred Riley – keyboards, Bernadette Rabaya – singer, Carlos Giammarese??? – guitar, Cordell – drums. Vince sang and played keyboards.

Their first record was called "(I Like to Do It In) Fast Cars" and came out in 1982 when he was eighteen. Lawrence's father put the record on his label, Mitchbal Records. The record was played on WGCI in regular rotation and a few records were sold. At the same time, Lawrence was also going to a teen club called The Playground, which was the brainchild of a young entrepreneurial man, Craig Thompson. He then met Jesse Saunders and Farley Keith, who were the DJs. They would play old disco records, which they would mix with The B-52's music. Lawrence got a job there, through Jesse, doing lights. He brought Jesse and Farley his record and they would play it. Lawrence told them that the stuff they were playing could be put on record and would make them even more popular DJs. By making a record, crowds at the clubs would know who the announced DJ was and would make the crowd attendance bigger. Lawrence told Jesse that he had a synthesizer and was in a band. They decided to work together to make what became the first house record.

They wrote the beginnings of the “On And On” record along with ten or eleven more songs. Then they made “On And On Traxs” and went to Precision Records, a pressing plant, to pay for 500 records. These records would be played in the clubs. In three weeks it became the hottest song in the city. They planned to sell the records at the concession stand at The Playground. They met the person that ran the concession stand, Duane Buford, and when it turned out that Duane played piano, they decided to make some music together.

They then decided to go to a record store called Imports Etc., where they sold a thousand records for four dollars each. They threw a party at Duane's house and wrote “Night Flight”, “Dum Dum”, “I’m The DJ,” and many other songs that would eventually become popular. Some of them came out of Lawrence's dad's label, Mitchbal, and the others came out on a label Lawrence named for Jesse called Jes Say Records. The logo was written in Lawrence's own handwriting.

Lawrence went back to the Precision Records to get more records from the owner, Larry Sherman, every couple of weeks. The teenage repeat customer made the owner curious, so Sherman asked him what he was doing with the records. After Lawrence told him that he was selling them for four dollars, Sherman and Lawrence made a deal that Sherman would press the records for no charge and share the profits. Lawrence wanted to have a label that would fit what they were doing and came up with the name Trax Records.

Lawrence went to the clubs in Detroit and gave the DJs copies of the records. After creating relationships with the underground record shops, he set his sights on New York City. He met Bruce Forrest in New York, gave him some records and ended up staying there for three months finding stores and selling records. He called up Duane and Jesse and told them to come to New York. After seeing how much Lawrence was making selling these records in New York, Sherman financed his trips to other states to find all the DJ stores and clubs.

Other DJs started teaming up, following what Lawrence had started. Frankie Knuckles teamed up with Jamie Principle to make their first record and Steve Hurley teamed up with Rocky Jones to start DJ International. This was happening when Vince met Marshall Jefferson in the clubs with his friends, Sleazy-D and Adonis (artist). Marshall wanted to get a record out under his nickname, Virgo, so Vince told them to do it under his own label. Vince and Marshall made the EP, “Virgo Trax”, which still gets played today.

== Slang MusicGroup ==
After exposing some of the dance world's best artists such as Marshall Jefferson, Adonis (artist), Byron Styngly, Farley Jackmaster Funk, Ron Hardy, Screamin’ Rachel, and Jesse Saunders at Trax Records, Lawrence founded Slang MusicGroup. Staying in Chicago, he became an entrepreneur and marketer. With Slang MusicGroup he created original and remix music for bands, gaming, and TV along with innovative advertising campaigns, working with brands and their agencies. He received many RIAA Gold and Platinum awards for his work. Vince Lawrence has worked with top selling acts such as Michael Jackson, Whitney Houston, Korn, R. Kelly, Wyclef Jean, John Legend, and Beyoncé. Slang MusicGroup has become a destination for electronic music makers of every genre.

== Chicago Fire: A Dance Music Anthology ==
For the musician and non-musician alike, Lawrence wanted to make it as easy as possible for anyone to make good-sounding music. He spearheaded the development of the Chicago Fire: A Dance Music Anthology in conjunction with Sony Acid. This anthology covers many types of electronic music: electro, deep house, old school, progressive, and drum & bass. Lawrencee was able to create a way for anybody to use loops to create new and improved house music. When interviewed, he expressed his hope that the tool set would help foster a new generation of house music makers and fans. He also expressed how he thought this would bring the house music genre out of the underground into the mainstream.

== Personal life ==
Lawrence's father is an independent songwriter and his mother is now a retired assistant buildings manager for the city's two main federal buildings. He attended Lake View High School and later studied marketing at Blackburn College in Carlinville, Illinois. He decided to leave College when he realized he was making more money than most seniors.

== Discography ==
Remixes:

Lupe Fiasco- Jump remix-1st &15th/Thirty Tigers
Beyoncé- Ego ---remix
John Legend- saveroom ---remix
John Legend ~ GREEN LIGHT ---remix
Justin Stein ~ LOOSE CONTROL ---remix
Jonathan Davis ~ GOT MONEY ---remix
Omarion - icebox ---remix
Omarion ~ TOUCH ---remix
Omarion ~ I'M TRYNA ---remix
Solange Knowles- tony ---remix
Solange Knowles- sandcastles ---remix
Wyclef Jean- sweetest girl ---remix
Wyclef Jean- touch your button ---remix
Amerie ~ TOUCH ---remix
Vivian Green - I Like It (But I Don't Need It) - Columbia ---remix
R. Kelly – Thoia Thoing- Jive ---Club Mix
P1-In My Soul-Novo ---Club Mix
P1-Terranova (Vespa) -Novo ---Club Mix
P1- Heat it Up -Novo ---Club Mix
Michael Jackson - One More Chance - Epic ---Club Mix (2)
R. Kelly – Ignition – Jive ---Club Mix (2)
Whitney Houston/Deborah Cox - Same Script Different Cast – Arista ---Club Mix (3)
Donell Jones - Where I Wanna Be – Arista ---Club Mix (2)
R. Kelly - I Wish – Jive ---Club Mix
Absolute - Is It Really Like That – Atlantic ---Club Mix
Lina (American singer) - No More – Atlantic ---Club Mix
Sisqo - Incomplete - Island/DefJam ---Club Mix
112 - Anywhere - BAD BOY ---Club Mix
Crystal Method – Comin’Back – Outpost ---Club Mix
KMFDM - Light - WaxTrax/TVT ---Club Mix
Concrete Blonde - Wanna Be Your Friend ---Club Mix
Taffy - I Love My Radio (UK Mix) – Mute ---Club Mix

Releases:

Cara Snower ~ Criminal ---Prod
JQ ~ Dixie Cups ---Prod
JQ ~ Superfly Guy ---Prod
JQ ~ go down and show ---Prod
Morgan Mallory ~ echoes ---Prod
Morgan Mallory ~ spotlight ---Prod
Morgan Mallory ~ still you love me ---Prod
Morgan Mallory ~ come feel me ---Prod
Jana G ~ sleepin ---Prod
Jana G ~ make me ---Prod
Jana G ~ open up ---Prod
Nikki Lynette ~ BIG ---Prod
Nikki Lynette ~ need a man ---Prod
Savvy and Mandy- dream ---Album Prod
Melody Swink- Today is Someday -Iris ---Album Prod
Ms. Alto- Heat/Taste the Wine-Slang Recordings ---Writer/Prod
Ms. Alto-Sunrise/My First Love-Slang Recordings ---Writer/Prod
Liquid Soul-Evolution- Shanachie ---Writer/Prod
Yvonne Gage-Mirror Mirror/So Good- Slang Recordings ---Writer/Prod
Katia-Let Me Be Free- Slang Recordings ---Writer/Prod
Poundseven-Self Titled-Hatelove ---Album Prod
Felix Da Housecatt-I Know ElectricBoy- Emperor Norton ---Writer/Prod
Urban Knights IV- Clubland- Narada ---Writer/Prod
North Avenue - Solutions/Someday - Music101 ---Writer/Prod
MOB - Creepin/Breaks Em Off - PD Waxx ---Engineer
KoS - Take U There - Long Tall Salley ---Writer/Prod
KoS - Summer Nights - Long Tall Salley ---Writer/Prod
Vince Lawrence - The Night is Young - KTM/Tressor ---Writer/Prod
Vince Lawrence - Songs Without a Singer - KTM/Tressor ---Album Prod
Terminal White - The Colorline – White ---Album Prod
Donna Summer – What Is It You Want - Atlantic ---Writer/Prod
Richard Rodgers - Bed of Roses – Sam ---Writer/Prod
Bang Orchestra- Rush- Trax ---Writer/Prod
CCP - A Solution – Mute ---Writer/Prod
The Swans - Girl with a Gun – Mute ---Writer/Prod
Bang Orchestra - Sample That – Geffen ---Writer/Prod
Shay Jones – Time To Party – Trax ---Writer/Prod
Shay Jones – Feeling the Need – Trax ---Writer/Prod
Gwendolyn - Come to Me - Precision / Trax ---Writer/Prod
Cath Carroll - Too Good To Live ---Writer/Prod
LeNoiz - Wanna Dance – Trax ---Prod
Fresh - Dum Dum – Trax ---Prod
Farley Jackmaster Funk - Love Can't Turn – Trax ---Writer
Marshall Jefferson - Move Your Body – Trax ---Engineer/Prod
Virgo/Marshall Jefferson - VirgoTrax / Go Wild - Other Side ---Prod/Engineer
Dezz7 / 10City - Funny Love – Trax ---Prod
Darryl Pandy - Climax – Brightstar ---Prod
Ron Hardy - Sensation – Trax ---Writer/Prod
Grant - Dance – Trax ---Prod
Midnight - In a Heartbeat – Jessay ---Writer
The Homeboys – It's Your Night – Jessay ---Writer
Dr. Derelict - Undercover – Jessay ---Writer
Z Factor – Z Factor – Mitchbal ---Writer/Prod
Jesse Saunders – On & On ---Writer
Z Factor – Fast Cars ---Writer/Prod
