= Farley "Jackmaster" Funk =

American musician, DJ and record producer

- Also known as: Farley Keith
- Born: Farley Keith Williams; January 25, 1962 (age 64); Chicago, Illinois, United States
- Genres: House
- Occupations: Disc jockey, composer, music producer, remixer
- Years active: 1981–present
- Labels: Trax Records, House Records
- Website: twitter.com/FARLEYJMF

Farley "Jackmaster" Funk (born Farley Keith Williams; January 25, 1962) is an American musician, DJ and record producer of Chicago house and acid house music. He is notable for writing and producing a number of highly influential tracks in the mid and late 1980s.

He has released records under various aliases such as "Farley Funkin' Keith", "Rude Boy Farley Keith", "The Housemaster Boyz", "Jackmaster Dick" or "The Godfather of House".

== Career ==
Farley got his start in the music industry in 1981 as one of the original members of the Hot Mix 5, a DJ team at WBMX-FM 102.7 FM, Oak Park, Illinois (original members of Kenny "Jammin" Jason, Mickey "Mixin" Oliver, Scott "Smokin" Silz, Farley "Funkin" Keith and Ralphi "Rockin" Rosario). He was a guest DJ at the Warehouse nightclub, and was a resident DJ at The Playground, which later became the Candy Store

In 1985, together with Chip E., he started a record label named House Records whose first release was "Jack Trax" by Mirage & Chip E. Farley's own debut single, and catalogue number 2, was "Aw Shucks (Let's Go Let's Go)" in 1985, followed by "Funkin with the Drums" in the same year. The latter contained stripped down "beat tracks" composed with drums alone.

After that followed a series of influential house and acid house records on Chicago's Trax Records: In 1985, Farley's single "Jack the Bass" (along with Chip E.'s "Time to Jack" from the "Jack Trax" EP) ushered in the popular "jacking" dance craze in Chicago house. Also in 1985, he released "Funkin' with the Drums Again", followed in 1986 by "Give Yourself to Me" with vocals by Kevin "Jack N House" Irving and gospel singer Ricky Dillard.

In 1986, his roommate at the time, Steve "Silk" Hurley, who was an important house pioneer himself, had produced a cover of "I Can't Turn Around" by Isaac Hayes selling well in the Chicago area. Hearing Hurley's version of the song, Farley teamed up with Jesse Saunders to make his own version of the track. Keeping much of Hurley's instrumental arrangement, he changed the hook from "I Can't Turn Around" to "Love Can't Turn Around" and dropped the rest of Hayes' original lyrics, substituting new words by author Vince Lawrence. The lead vocals were performed by church singer Darryl Pandy who also performed the song on the British TV show Top of the Pops. The new version, "Love Can't Turn Around", reached number 10 in the UK Singles Chart in 1986. It holds an important place in the history of house music as the first record in the genre to make it into the UK Singles Chart and to popularize house music overseas.

Farley had several other follow-up hits during the late 1980s, most notably "House Nation" in 1986, credited to the House Master Boyz and the Rude Boy of House, which followed "Love Can't Turn Around" into the UK top ten.

The album No Vocals Necessary (1988) contained a 303 driven instrumental acid house track named "The Acid Life" that was successfully (but uncredited) covered by Technotronic as "Pump Up the Jam" (1989).

Apart from his own works, he did some remixing, producing and editing for other artists during this time. He also DJed and performed at many parties in the Chicago suburbs, and is still playing venues as a DJ as of September 2015.

== Discography ==
=== Albums ===
- No Vocals Necessary (1988)

=== Singles ===
List of singles, with selected chart positions, showing year released
Title	Year	Peak chart positions
Title	Year	UK
"Aw Shucks (Let's Go Let's Go)"	1985	—
"Funkin with the Drums"	1985	—
"Jack the Bass"	1985	—
"Funkin with the Drums Again"	1985	—
"Give Your Self to Me"	1986	—
"Thanks 4 the Trax U Lost" (credited as the Housemaster Boyz)	1986	—
"Love Can't Turn Around"	1986	10
"House Nation" (credited as the Housemaster Boyz and the Rude Boyz of House)	1986	8
"It's U" (with Ricky Dillard)	1987	—
"Hey Norton (Aw Shucks)"	1987	—
"U Ain't Really House"	1987	—
"U Ain't Really Acieed (House)"	1988	—
"As Always" (with Ricky Dillard)	1988	49
"Think!" (with Precious Red)	1989	76
"Free at Last"	1989	76
"Beat That Bitch with a Bat" (credited as Blackman)	1993	—
"Pray 4 Me"	1994	—
"Another Day"	1995	—
"Resurrection EP"	1996	—
"I Call on You"	2004	—
"—" denotes a recording that did not chart or was not released in that territory.

=== DJ mixes ===
- Real House: Hot Mix CD (1996)

=== Compilations ===
- Trax Classix (2005)
