= Mickey Oliver =

American house DJ

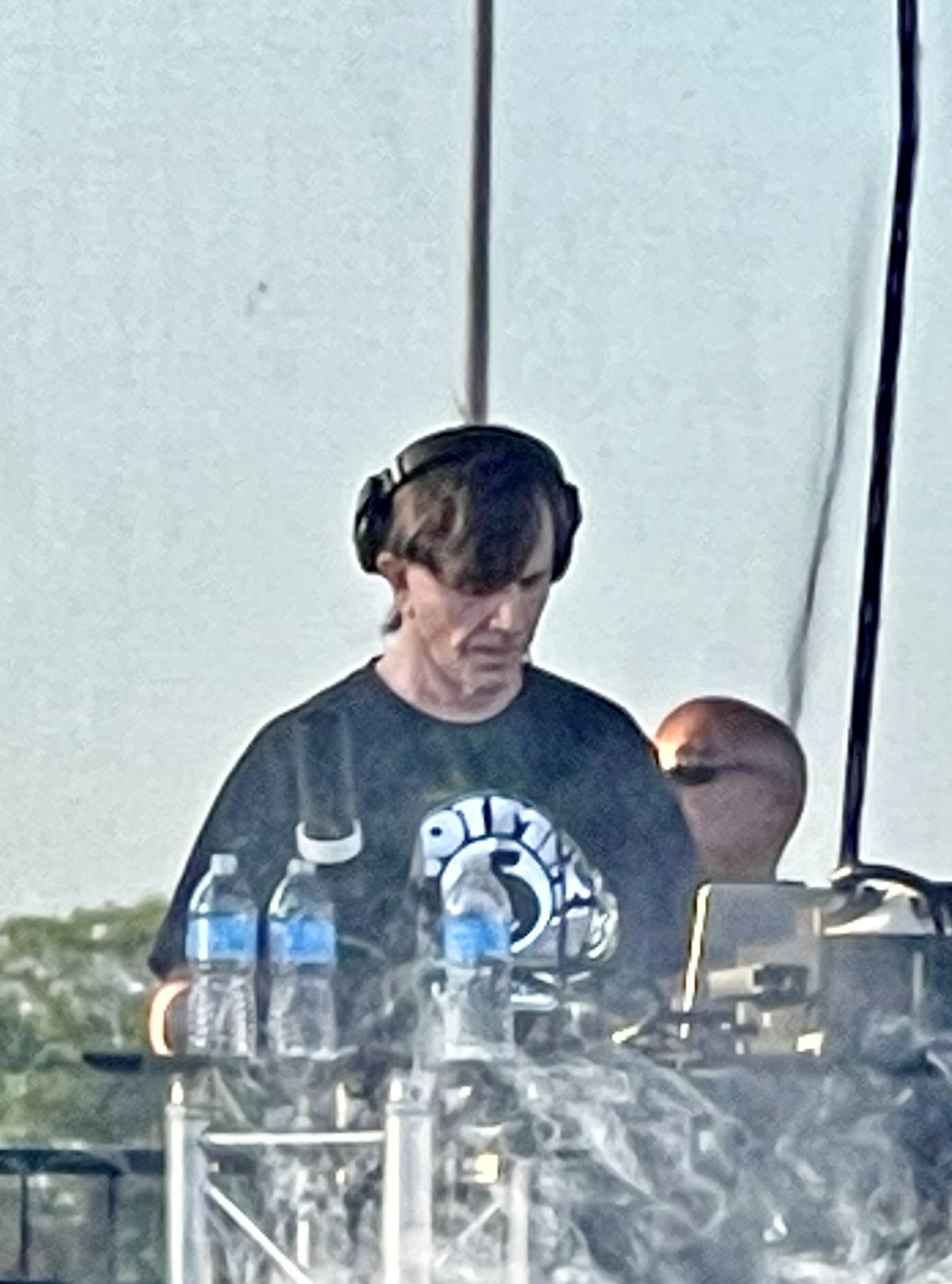
- Oliver on June 14, 2025 in Aurora, Illinois

Background information
- Born: Chicago, Illinois, United States
- Genres: House, dance, EDM
- Occupations: DJ; remixer; artist
- Instruments: Turntables, musical keyboard, voice
- Years active: 1981–present
- Labels: Hot Mix 5 Records, Universal Distribution
- Website: mickeyoliver.com

Mickey Oliver is an American musician born on the South Side of Chicago who played a significant role in popularizing house music. He gained prominence as a founding member of the Hot Mix 5 team, on the Chicago radio station 102.7 WBMX. Oliver eventually became the president of the group, which played a crucial role in shaping the early Chicago house music scene. The Hot Mix 5 team were the first to introduce and broadcast the new sound of house music, and the show attracted an impressive audience of over 2 million listeners, a record which still stands for major market radio.

In recognition of his accomplishments, the City of Chicago honored Mickey Oliver by naming a street after him, "Mickey Mixin Oliver Blvd" located on Belmont Avenue and Wilton Ave in Wrigleyville. One of his early releases, "In-Ten-Si-T" (1988), co-written and produced by Jim "Cheese" Romano, is regarded as one of the all-time Top 10 most influential house music records. Another notable success came in 1987 with the production of "Never Let Go," which became a hit. Oliver's works continue to be remixed and re-released by artists and producers worldwide.

In 2011, Oliver achieved chart success on Billboard Magazine's Dance Music Club Play chart with his single "As Days Go By," featuring singer Kim Smith from Baton Rouge. The track debuted at #46 on January 22, 2011, and reached #16 on the chart. This renewed recognition of Oliver's talent opened doors to more remixing opportunities. In 2012, he remixed the single "Zoon Baloomba," which peaked at #21 on the Billboard chart on November 18.

In 2010, Mickey Oliver premiered his Las Vegas theatrical show, Intensit-T, at the Planet Hollywood complex on the Vegas strip. Intensit-T was a dance revue variety show that showcased the influence of house music on other genres. In the same year, Oliver produced and starred in a Las Vegas TV show called Intensi-T TV, which aired on ABC Las Vegas, Direct TV, and Dish Network. The 10-episode entertainment/variety show explored Las Vegas culture and featured a weekly sketch comedy routine. While gaining an underground fan club, the show can still be viewed on demand on Roku.

Oliver also created a lighthearted musical theatre production "Revolution Chicago," which tells the story of how house music originated on the streets of Chicago and grew into a global phenomenon. Revolution Chicago premiered in September 2019.

Mickey Oliver continues to actively work as a DJ, producer, remixer, and television show creator.
