= Steve "Silk" Hurley =

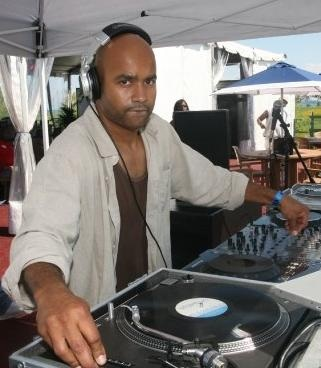

Background information
- Also known as: Steve Hurley; J. M. Silk; Jack Master Silk; Voices of Life; The Voices of Life; SilkMix.com
- Born: Steven W. Hurley; November 9, 1962 (age 63); Chicago, Illinois, U.S.
- Genres: House
- Occupations: DJ; record producer; remixer; singer; songwriter
- Years active: 1983–present
- Labels: RCA; Silk; Atlantic; InDaSoul; Underground
- Website: Steve "Silk" Hurley

Steve W. "Silk" Hurley (born November 9, 1962), also known as J. M. Silk (for "Jack Master Silk"), is an American club DJ, house music producer, and songwriter.

From 1985 to 1988, he had four top-10 singles on the US Dance chart, including the number-one hit "I Can't Turn Around", all released in collaboration with Keith Nunnally as J. M. Silk. With "Jack Your Body" (number 25 on the U.S. Billboard Hot Dance Music/Club Play), he topped the UK Singles Chart in January 1987 as a solo artist, while one of his later compositions, "Work It Out" from 1989, brought him his fifth top-10 record on the US Dance chart (at number three). To date, Hurley's last charting single is "The Word Is Love (Say the Word)", also known as "Silk's Anthem of Life" by The Voices of Life, which peaked at number 26 in 1997 in the UK.

Hurley is a four-time Grammy Award nominee; two times as Remixer of the Year, Non-Classical (in 1999 and 2000), and twice for Best Remixed Recording, Non-Classical (in 2002 and 2003).

== Early life ==
Hurley studied engineering at Robert Lindblom Math & Science Academy (originally named Lindblom Technical High School) in Chicago, Illinois, and later at junior college but dropped out by 1981 to concentrate on his music career full-time.

== Career ==
Hurley gained worldwide fame as a DJ on the Saturday Night Live Ain't No Jive Dance Party on WBMX in Chicago in the mid 1980s. Hurley's mixing style is different than the usual radio or club house DJ (such as Tony Humphries on WRKS in the early 1990s), since his style of mixing incorporates not only beatmatching, but advanced techniques only done by hip hop DJ's or turntablists such as scratching, beat juggling, cutting, needle dropping and back spinning. He released songs under the stage name of Steve "Silk" Hurley and, with vocalist Keith Nunnally, had many hits on the Billboard Dance Club Songs chart as J. M. Silk, including "I Can't Turn Around," which hit number one in 1986.

His song "Jack Your Body" was also a hit on the UK Singles Chart, reaching number one for two weeks in January and February 1987. This was the UK's first house music chart topper, achieving the number one spot with the distinction of never having been played on BBC Radio 1 other than on chart shows. In spite of "Jack Your Body"'s success, Hurley has had no further singles (under his own name) reach the UK charts, thus condemning him to one-hit wonder status. In 1988, he released an album titled Work It Out Compilation on Atlantic Records.

Hurley also worked as a prominent remixer, re-working tracks for Madonna, Michael Jackson, CeCe Peniston, New Order, Black Box, En Vogue, Janet Jackson and Inner City.

Hurley was nominated for a Grammy Award as Remixer of the Year, Non-Classical in 1998 and 1999, and for Best Remixed Recording, Non-Classical in 2002 and 2003.

Hurley's remixes could be heard on The Tom Joyner Morning Show every Tuesday and Thursday morning during the last half of the second hour of the nationally syndicated morning show, which originated from Dallas, Texas.

== Controversy ==
=== Steve Hurley vs Farley Keith ===
In 1986, WBMX DJ and house music producer Farley Keith had stunned the Chicago community when he hit the top-10 of the UK Singles Chart with "Love Can't Turn Around," released under the alias Farley "Jackmaster" Funk. Hurley claimed the track was a blatant theft of one of his own productions, and the two stopped speaking to each other. At that time, Farley Keith shared an apartment with Hurley, who came up with a cover of an Isaac Hayes' disco record, called "I Can't Turn Around", from 1975. Before Hurley could arrange to have the record licensed for overseas distribution, Keith produced his own version of the song, keeping much of Hurley's instrumental arrangement, dropping the rest of Hayes' original lyric, while Vince Lawrence supplied new words. The final result officially became the first ever Chicago house record to reach the music charts. Ironically, Hurley's version topped the US Dance chart and the producer later got his satisfaction by trumping Keith's success with the number one hit "Jack Your Body".

== Discography ==
=== Albums ===
Year	Title	Artist(s)
1987	Hold on to Your Dream: Release date: 1987; Record label: RCA Records; Formats: LP, CS	J. M. Silk
1989	Work It Out Compilation: Release date: 1989; Record label: Atlantic Records; Formats: LP, CD, CS	Steve "Silk" Hurley

=== Singles ===
Year	Title	Alias	Peak chart positions				Certifications	Album
Year	Title	Alias	IT	UK	US Dance	Hot Dance Singles Sales	Certifications	Album
1985	"Music Is the Key"	J. M. Silk	—	—	9	18		The House Sound of Chicago
1986	"Shadows of Your Love"	J. M. Silk featuring Steve "Silk" Hurley	—	—	3	40		Hold on to Your Dream
1986	"I Can't Turn Around" (by Isaac Hayes)	J. M. Silk	—	62	1	9		Hold on to Your Dream
1986	"Jack Your Body"	Steve "Silk" Hurley	—	1	25	37	BPI: Silver	Hold on to Your Dream
1987	"Let the Music Take Control"	J. M. Silk	—	47	2	8		Hold on to Your Dream
1987	"She's So Far Away"	J. M. Silk	—	80	—	—		Hold on to Your Dream
1987	"Heart of Passion"	J. M. Silk	—	—	—	—		Hold on to Your Dream
1987	"Cry of the Lonely"	J. M. Silk	—	—	50	—		Hold on to Your Dream
1988	"All in Vain"	J. M. Silk	—	—	—	—		Jack Trax: The Fifth Album
1988	"It's Percussion"	Steve "Silk" Hurley featuring M-Doc	—	—	—	—		
1989	"Work It Out"	Steve "Silk" Hurley featuring M-Doc	—	—	3	17		Work It Out Compilation
1989	"Chain of Fools"	Steve "Silk" Hurley featuring Risse	—	—	—	—		Work It Out Compilation
1989	"Cold World"	Steve "Silk" Hurley featuring Jamie Principle	—	—	22	36		Work It Out Compilation
1991	"Seasons of Love"^{[A]}	Keith Nunnally	—	—	—	—		
1992	"Melody"	Steve "Silk" Hurley	—	—	—	—		
1997	"The Word Is Love (Say the Word)"	The Voices of Life featuring Sharon Pass	15	26	—	—		
2000	"Dubs from the Dungeon Vol.1"	Steve "Silk" Hurley	—	—	—	—		
2002	"Don't Give Up"	The Voices of Life featuring Gordon Chambers	—	—	—	—		Non-album single
2003	"Stop Playin'"	SilkMix.com vs. 2 Live Crew	—	—	—	—		
2003	"Runnin' Away"	The Voices of Life featuring Sharon Pass	—	—	—	—		
2014	"Classic"	Steve "Silk" Hurley featuring Javante	—	—	—	—		
"—" denotes a single that did not chart or was not released in that region.

Notes

- A Steve Hurley was credited as one of backing vocalists on the Keith Nunnally's debut solo single. The other names were Sharon Pass, Kym Sims and Manny Mohr.

== Music awards and nominations ==
Award	Nominations	Wins
ASCAP Awards	3	3
Grammy Awards	4	0

ASCAP Award

- ASCAP Writer's Award for "Keep on Walkin'"
- ASCAP Writer's Award for "Too Blind to See It"
- ASCAP Writer's Award for "I'm Not Over You"

Grammy Award

Year	Nominated work(s)	Award	Result
1999	"If You Could Read My Mind (Silk's Uplifting Vocal)" by Stars on 54 "If You Could Read My Mind (Silk's House on 54 Mix)" by Stars on 54 "Nobody Else (Silk's House Revival)" by CeCe Peniston "Special Love (Silk's Special House Mix)" by Jestofunk feat. Jocelyn Brown "Where You Are (Silk's Old Skool Mix)" by Rashaan Patterson "The Word Is Love (Silk's Anthem 7)" by The Voices of Life	Remixer of the Year, Non-Classical	Nominated
2000	"Go Down Moses (Silk's Spiritual Anthem)" by Kelly G feat. Sharon Pass "He Loves Me 2 (Silk's 12" Mix)" by CeCe Peniston "Higher (Silk's Journey to Heaven Mix)" by Vernessa Mitchell "Jack Your Body 2000 (Silk's Y2K Mix)" by Steve "Silk" Hurley "Rollercoaster (Silk's Uplifting Extended Mix)" by B*Witched "Yeah Get Down (Silk's Disco Dub of Life)" by Maurice Joshua presents The Reunion Project	Remixer of the Year, Non-Classical	Nominated
2002	"Soul Shakedown (Silk's Downunder Mix)" by Bob Marley	Best Remixed Recording, Non-Classical	Nominated
2003	"What About Us? (SilkMix.Com Mix)" by Brandy	Best Remixed Recording, Non-Classical	Nominated

Other Awards

- Billboard Top Producer of 1994 (shared with LA Babyface, R. Kelly, Teddy Riley and Jam & Lewis)
- British Charity Award-UK as Remixer of the Year
- Winter Music Conference as Remixer of the Year

== See also ==
- List of UK number one singles
- List of number-one dance hits (United States)
- List of artists who reached number one on the US Dance chart
