= Jack Your Body =

1986 single by Steve "Silk" Hurley

Single by Steve "Silk" Hurley

from the album Hold on to Your Dream
- Released: 1986
- Genre: Chicago house
- Length: 3:13
- Label: Underground
- Songwriter: Steve Hurley
- Producer: Steve "Silk" Hurley

Steve "Silk" Hurley singles chronology
| "I Can't Turn Around" (1986) | "Jack Your Body" (1986) | "Let the Music Take Control" (1987) |

Alternative cover
- 2010 re-release cover

"Jack Your Body" is a song by American music producer Steve "Silk" Hurley, originally released as a single in 1986. It was included on the album Hold on to Your Dream (1987) under the alias J.M. Silk. The song topped the UK Singles Chart for two weeks in January 1987.

== History ==
One of the landmark records in the history of house music, "Jack Your Body" was composed and produced by Hurley. The title refers to jacking, an ecstatic dance style that emerged within the Chicago house scene in the early to mid 1980s. The song climbed to number 25 on the US Billboard Hot Dance/Disco Club Play chart and number 37 on the 12-inch Singles Sales chart. The song became a hit in the United Kingdom, reaching number one for two weeks in January 1987.

"Jack Your Body" was the first UK number one single to achieve the majority of its sales on the 12-inch format. Under the chart rules in place at the time, the 12-inch sales should not have counted toward the song's chart position, as its running time exceeded the then-current 25-minute limit. However, the 25-minute rule was not enforced, since the running time was not brought to the chart compilers' attention until the record was already at number one.

Hurley never promoted the track, as he was "under pressure" to complete the Hold on to Your Dream album. He did not know that the track had reached number one on the UK Singles Chart—when his manager mentioned, in passing, that the track had hit number one in the UK, he assumed this meant on the UK Dance Chart. In spite of the song's success, Hurley has had no further solo singles whatsoever (under his own name) on the UK Singles Chart. "Jack Your Body" was re-released, each time with new remixes, in 1987, 1992, 2000, and 2009.

== Impact and legacy ==
In 1996, Oliver Bondzio of German electronic music duo Hardfloor chose "Jack Your Body" as one of the tunes that changed his life, saying, "This was one of the first tracks I heard being played in Checkers, a club in Düsseldorf I went to for three years. It had the best sound system and DJs. It was the first to play house and acid house tunes. I like the way they sampled the 'jack' in the old skool way. You can't forget this one." In 2014, Rolling Stone featured it in their "20 Best Chicago House Records" list, adding, "Arriving a few years into house's existence, Hurley's "Jack Your Body" came out swinging with unapologetic experimentation — its Roland-centered electronic spine helping to touch off the acid house revolution in the U.K. Here was something far removed from disco's orchestral feel and entirely new. It was ultimately the first house song to hit Number One in the U.K."

In 2020, The Guardian ranked the song number 50 in their list of "The 100 greatest UK No 1s", writing, "It's hard to imagine now how strange and alien 'Jack Your Body' sounded in 1987. Other early house hits had at least come with a song or a hook attached, but this had neither: it may be the most minimal No 1 of all time. It isn't by any stretch of the imagination the best Chicago had to offer in 1987: as a signal of a vast shift in the way pop music sounded, it's unbeatable." In 2024, Classic Pop ranked it number 10 in their list of "Top 20 80s House Hits". In 2025, Billboard magazine ranked it number 36 in their list of "The 50 Best House Songs of All Time".

== Track listings ==
- 1986 7-inch single
1. "Jack Your Body" (edit) – 3:13
2. "Dub Your Body" (edit) – 3:35
- 1986 12-inch single
1. "Jack Your Body" (Club Your Body) – 6:50
2. "Jack Your Body" (Dub Your Body) – 6:25
3. "Jack Your Body" (Home Made) – 6:34
4. "Steve 'Silk' Hurley" – 7:03
- 1987 12-inch single
1. "Jack Your Body" (Monty 'House' remix) – 6:29 (remixed by Simon Harris)
2. "Jack Your Body" (Club Your Body) – 6:50
3. "Jack Your Body" (Dub Your Body) – 6:25
- "Back to Jack Your Body '92" (12-inch and CD single)
1. "Back to Jack Your Body" (remix) – 4:52 (remixed by Burger Industries)
2. "Jack Your Body" (Def-mix) – 6:47 (remixed by Burger Industries)
3. "Jack Your Body" (Ambient-remix) – 9:38 (remixed by The Bionaut)
- "Jack Your Body 2000" (12-inch single 1)
1. "Jack Your Body" (original 1986 mix—digitally re-produced & edited) – 9:17
2. "Jack Your Body" (Silk's Y2K mix) – 6:56
3. "Jack Your Body" (Silk's Y2K dub) – 5:31
- "Jack Your Body 2000" (12-inch single 2)
1. "Jack Your Body" (Jazz Yo Body dub)
2. "Jack Your Body" (Peppi & Kokki remix)
3. "Jack Your Body" (Kidd's Classic remix)
4. "Jack Your Body" (Swing Yo Body)
- "Jack Your Body" (2009 digital release)
1. "Jack Your Body" (Hardfloor radio edit) – 3:15
2. "Jack Your Body" (Hardfloor remix) – 6:52
3. "Jack Your Body" (Ambient remix by Burger Industries) – 5:03
4. "Jack Your Body" (original club mix) – 6:53

== Charts ==
=== Weekly charts ===
| Chart (1986–1987) | Peak position |
|---|---|
| Austria (Ö3 Austria Top 40) | 25 |
| Belgium (Ultratop 50 Flanders) | 18 |
| Europe (European Hot 100 Singles) | 9 |
| Ireland (IRMA) | 1 |
| Netherlands (Dutch Top 40) | 14 |
| Netherlands (Single Top 100) | 16 |
| UK Singles (Official Charts) | 1 |
| US 12-inch Singles Sales (Billboard) | 37 |
| US Dance/Disco Club Play (Billboard) | 25 |
| West Germany (GfK) | 14 |

=== Year-end charts ===
| Chart (1987) | Position |
|---|---|
| UK Singles (OCC) | 38 |

== Certifications ==
| Region | Certification | Certified units/sales |
|---|---|---|
| United Kingdom (BPI) | Silver | 250,000^{^} |
^{^} Shipments figures based on certification alone.

== See also ==
- Lists of UK Singles Chart number ones
