= Darryl Pandy =

American singer

Darryl Pandy (December 24, 1962 – June 10, 2011) was an American gospel and house music singer from Chicago.

== Music career ==
Coming from a Broadway and opera background, Pandy was a lead vocalist in the choir of Chicago's Church of Universal Awareness.

He is mostly known for performing one of the first international hits in house music, Farley "Jackmaster" Funk's 1986 song "Love Can't Turn Around", which he also sang live in a "flamboyant performance" on the British TV show Top of the Pops that made him famous. The record peaked No. 10 in the UK Single Chart and played an important role in the history of house music as it was the first house record being a major success overseas, especially regarding the fact that the U.K. developed their own and very influential hot spot of house and acid house in the so-called "second summer of love" between 1988 and 1989.

Pandy recorded numerous other house singles, many of them under his own name. In 1998, he released the album Darryl Pandy on Mirakkle Records.

Having been ill for 7 months before his death at age 48, there were several benefit shows for Pandy.

== Reception ==
In an article on the early Chicago house music scene from 1986, Barry Walters from SPIN magazine wrote about Pandy's performance of "Love Can't Turn Around":

"Darryl Pandy is an enormous man, a Refrigerator Perry gone disco diva. He comes from a Broadway and opera background and has a six and a half octave range. Ask him to prove it and he’ll gladly sing selections from Porgy and Bess, taking on both Porgy and Bess. On record, notably ‘Love Can't Turn Around’, Pandy resembles a possessed cross between his idols Yma Sumac and Minnie Riperton, with a dark trace of Loleatta Holloway. Like Doctor's Cat, Pandy sings with emotions endearingly inappropriate to the material. He begins ‘Love Can't Turn Around’ with all the hypermasculinity of an ill-fated Wagnerian baritone, to come back in the third verse as Screamin' Jay Hawkins. His dynamics are so ridiculously wrong by contemporary R&B standards that they become absolutely right for house. Pandy's histrionics are emblematic of the house scene in general. House is about the loss of decorum and control. From sexual extravagance to dance-floor excess, everything about house is geared towards losing it."
