= Warehouse (nightclub) =

Former nightclub in Chicago, Illinois, US

Coordinates: 41°52′44″N 87°38′34″W

- Interactive map of the Warehouse area

General information
- Location: 206 South Jefferson Street, Chicago, Illinois

Design and construction
- Known for: Birthplace of house music

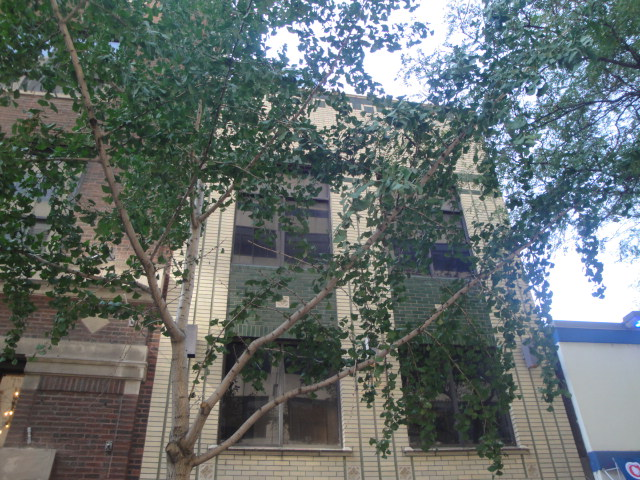
The Warehouse, on Honorary Frankie Knuckles Way

The Warehouse is a historic building located in Chicago, Illinois in the United States, best known for the nightclub of the same name catering to the gay and alternative communities that was established in 1977 under the direction of Robert "Robbie" Williams. It was Robbie Williams who on promotional posters would describe events at the Warehouse as 'house' parties or 'house' music. As such, the Warehouse is best known as the namesake for, and one of the origins of, house music. The Warehouse is specifically associated with Chicago house, and was the genre's birthplace under its first musical director, DJ Frankie Knuckles.

The building was designated as a Chicago Landmark on June 21, 2023.

== Description ==
A broad range of dance music was played at the Warehouse; however, the genres played first and foremost were R'n'B and Disco. Frankie Knuckles experimented with different possibilities of developing an original expression, mixing disco music with European electronic music. DJ History reports: "The style of music now known as house was so named after a shortened version of his [Knuckles'] club."

Located at 206 South Jefferson Street in Chicago, the club consisted of a three-story former factory. The Warehouse drew in around five hundred patrons from midnight Saturday to midday Sunday. The Warehouse was patronized primarily by gay black and Latino men, who came to dance to disco music played by DJ Knuckles. Admission was five dollars and the club offered free juice and water to dancers. The middle floor is where DJ Knuckles began to experiment with editing disco breaks on a reel-to-tape recorder. This technique would give birth to the Chicago house music genre.

The Warehouse became a hub for the people of Chicago, specifically black gay men. It was compared to a religious and spiritual experience. At the time, many black gay men felt excluded from the religious communities that they had been raised in. This contributed to the sexually open culture created at the Warehouse which was said to be "unusually free of aggression".

Chicago house was a specifically black gay genre in many ways and for many years the Warehouse was a space that cultivated that scene in a safe way. Black music was at the heart of the disco era and it is impossible to separate the roots of disco from the disenfranchised queer people of color that flocked to it. House is widely seen as a continuation of disco in that "it mutated the form, intensifying the very aspects of the music that most offended white rockers and black funkateers: the mechanic repetition, the synthetic and electronic textures, the rootlessness, the ‘depraved’ hypersexuality and ‘decadent’ druggy hedonism."

The Warehouse allowed house music to flourish under Frankie Knuckles, continuing the tradition of making music for the club over something that would be played on the radio or hit the top 40 charts. "The stomping four-to-the-floor kick-drum would become the defining mark of house music." Knuckles would alter songs by adding synthetic handclaps, special hi-hat patterns and bass loops, innovating the way a song can be manipulated to fit a club setting.

== Changes ==
After the Warehouse doubled its admission fee in late 1982, it grew more commercial. Knuckles decided to leave and start his own club the Power Plant, and later the Powerhouse, to which his devoted followers followed. In response, the Warehouse's owners founded the Music Box (located 326 N Michigan Ave, from 1983 until 1988) and hired a new DJ named Ron Hardy.

== Frankie Knuckles tributes ==
In 2004, the city of Chicago – which "became notorious in the dance community around the world for passing the so-called 'anti-rave ordinance' in 2000 that made property owners, promoters and deejays subject to $10,000 fines for being involved in an unlicensed dance party" – named a stretch of street in downtown Chicago after Knuckles, where the old Warehouse once stood, on Jefferson Street between Jackson Boulevard and Madison Street in Chicago's West Loop. On August 25, 2004, the city renamed the block "Frankie Knuckles Way"; the city also declared August 25 to be Frankie Knuckles Day. Future United States President Barack Obama was among the advocates for the change as an Illinois state senator.

== See also ==
- Chicago house
- List of electronic dance music venues
- Homophobia in the African-American community
