= House music =

Genre of electronic dance music

- Other names: House
- Stylistic origins: Disco; electronic; hi-NRG; electro; post-disco; synth-pop; boogie; chiptune; Euro disco; dub; jazz; post-punk
- Cultural origins: Early 1980s, Chicago, Illinois, U.S.
- Typical instruments: Drum machines; synthesizers
- Derivative forms: Alternative dance; budots; Eurodance; footwork; techno; trance

Subgenres
- Acid house; Afro house; afro tech; ambient house; amapiano; Balearic beat; big room house; deep house; diva house; electro house; funky house; future house; garage house; ghetto house; ghettotech; gqom; kwaito; Latin house; microhouse; outsider house; progressive house; tech house; tribal house; tropical house; UK hard house; bloghouse; (complete list)

Regional scenes
- Cancún; France; Ibiza; Italy; Russia; South Africa; Venezuela; Western Asia

Local scenes
- Chicago

Other topics
- List of house artists; African-American music

House music, or simply house, is a type of electronic dance music which is characterized by a repetitive four-on-the-floor beat and a typical tempo of 115–130 beats per minute. It was created in Chicago by DJs and music producers from the city's queer Black underground club culture and evolved slowly in the early/mid 1980s as DJs began altering disco songs to give them a more mechanical beat. By early 1988, house became mainstream and supplanted the typical '80s music beat.

House is one of the first forms of electronic dance music. It was created and pioneered by DJs and producers in Chicago such as Frankie Knuckles, Ron Hardy, Jesse Saunders, Chip E., Joe Smooth, Steve "Silk" Hurley, Farley "Jackmaster" Funk, Marshall Jefferson, Phuture, and others. House music then expanded to New York City, and internationally to cities such as London, and ultimately became a worldwide phenomenon.

House has a large influence on pop music, especially dance music. It was incorporated into works by major international artists including Whitney Houston, Janet Jackson, Madonna, Pet Shop Boys, Kylie Minogue, Lady Gaga and many others, and produced many mainstream hits such as "Pump Up the Jam" by Technotronic, "French Kiss" by Lil Louis, "Show Me Love" by Robin S., and "Push the Feeling On" by the Nightcrawlers. Many house DJs also did and continue to do remixes for pop artists. House music is popular on radio and in clubs while retaining a foothold on the underground scenes across the globe as well.

== Characteristics ==
House music demo
A full house music track.

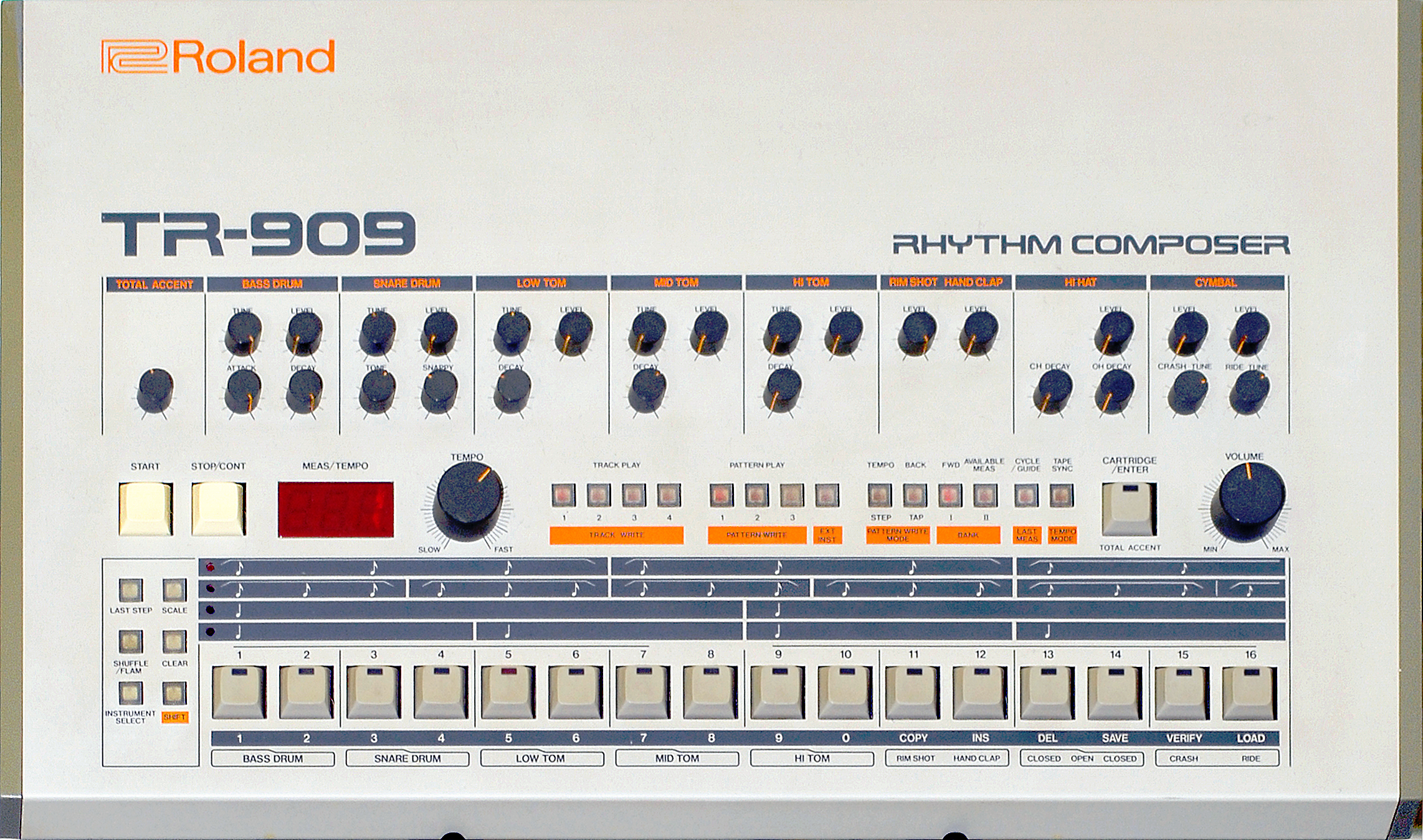

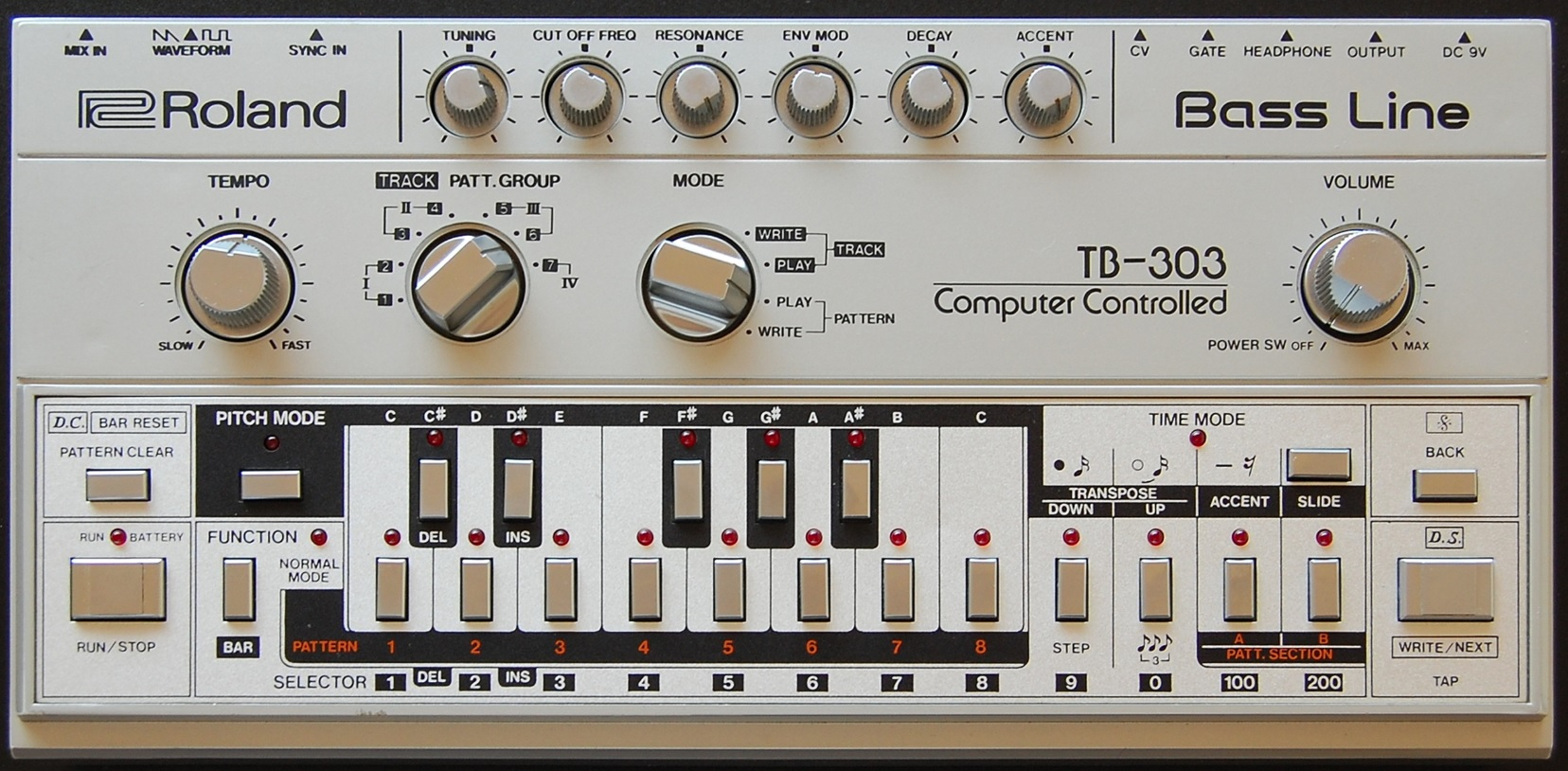
The TR-909 drum machine (top) and TB-303 synthesizer, instruments often used in house music

A house rhythm played on a Roland TR-909 drum machine, featuring a four-on-the-floor bass drum plus cymbal, claps, hi-hats and rimshots

In its most typical form, the genre is characterized by repetitive 4/4 rhythms including bass drums, off-beat hi-hats, snare drums, claps, and/or snaps at a tempo of between 120 and 130 beats per minute (bpm); synthesizer riffs; deep basslines; and often, but not necessarily, sung, spoken or sampled vocals. In house, the bass drum is usually played on beats one, two, three, and four, and the snare drum, claps, or other higher-pitched percussion on beats two and four. The drumbeats in house music are almost always provided by an electronic drum machine, often a Roland TR-808, TR-909, or a TR-707. Claps, shakers, snare drum, or hi-hat sounds are used to add syncopation. One of the signature rhythm riffs, especially in early Chicago house, is built on the clave pattern. Congas and bongos may be added for an African sound, or metallic percussion for a Latin feel.

Sometimes, the drum sounds are "saturated" by boosting the gain to create a more aggressive edge. One classic subgenre, acid house, is defined through the squelchy sounds created by the Roland TB-303 bass synthesizer. House music could be produced on "cheap and consumer-friendly electronic equipment" and used sound gear, which made it easier for independent labels and DJs to create tracks. The electronic drum machines and other gear used by house DJs and producers were formerly considered "too cheap-sounding" by "proper" musicians. House music producers typically use sampled instruments, rather than bringing session musicians into a recording studio. Even though a key element of house production is layering sounds, such as drum machine beats, samples, synth basslines, and so on, the overall "texture...is relatively sparse". Unlike pop songs, which emphasize higher-pitched sounds like melody, in house music, the lower-pitched bass register is most important.

House tracks typically involve an intro, a chorus, various verse sections, a midsection, and a brief outro. Some tracks do not have a verse, taking a vocal part from the chorus and repeating the same cycle. House music tracks are often based on eight-bar sections which are repeated. They are often built around bass-heavy loops or basslines produced by a synthesizer and/or around samples of disco, soul, jazz-funk, or funk songs. DJs and producers creating a house track to be played in clubs may make a "seven or eight-minute 12-inch mix"; if the track is intended to be played on the radio, a "three-and-a-half-minute" radio edit is used. House tracks build up slowly, by adding layers of sound and texture, and by increasing the volume.

House tracks may have vocals like a pop song, but some are "completely minimal instrumental music". If a house track does have vocals, the vocal lines may also be simple "words or phrases" that are repeated.

== Origins of the term house ==
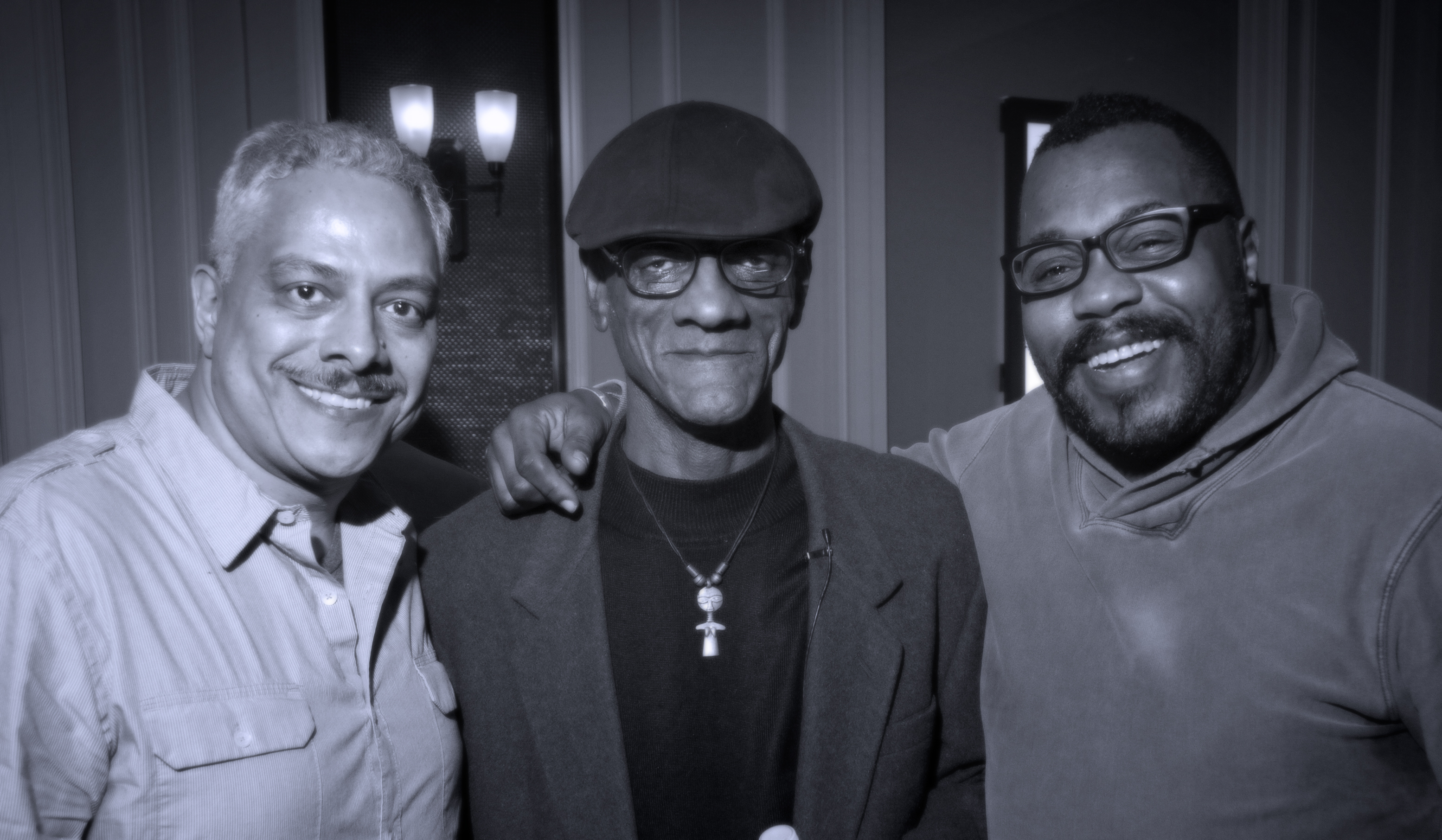
House music pioneers Alan King, Robert Williams and Derrick Carter

One book from 2009 states the name "house music" originated from a Chicago club called the Warehouse that was open from 1977 to 1982. Clubbers to the Warehouse were primarily black gay men, who came to dance to music played by the club's resident DJ, Frankie Knuckles, who fans refer to as the "godfather of house". Frankie began the trend of splicing together different records when he found that the records he had were not long enough to satisfy his audience of dancers. After the Warehouse closed in 1983, eventually the crowds went to Knuckles' new club, The Power House, later to be called The Power Plant, and the club was renamed, yet again, into Music Box with Ron Hardy as the resident DJ. The 1986 documentary, "House Music in Chicago", by filmmaker Phil Ranstrom, captured opening night at The Power House, and stands as the only film or video to capture a young Frankie Knuckles in this early era, right after his departure from The Warehouse.

In the Channel 4 documentary Pump Up the Volume, Knuckles remarks that the first time he heard the term "house music" was upon seeing "we play house music" on a sign in the window of a bar on Chicago's South Side. One of the people in the car joked, "you know that's the kind of music you play down at the Warehouse!" In self-published statements, South-Side Chicago DJ Leonard "Remix" Rroy claimed he put such a sign in a tavern window because it was where he played music that one might find in one's home; in his case, it referred to his mother's soul and disco records, which he worked into his sets.

Chicago house artist Farley "Jackmaster" Funk was quoted as saying, "In 1982, I was DJing at a club called The Playground and there was this kid named Leonard 'Remix' Rroy who was a DJ at a rival club called The Rink. He came over to my club one night, and into the DJ booth and said to me, 'I've got the gimmick that's gonna take all the people out of your club and into mine – it's called House music'. Now, where he got that name from or what made him think of it I don't know, so the answer lies with him".

Chicago artist Chip E.'s 1985 song "It's House" may also have helped to define this new form of electronic music. However, Chip E. himself lends credence to the Knuckles association, claiming the name came from methods of labeling records at the Importes Etc. record store, where he worked in the early 1980s. Bins of music that DJ Knuckles played at the Warehouse nightclub were labelled "As Heard at the Warehouse" in the store, shortened to "House". Patrons later asked for new music for the bins, which Chip E. implies was a demand the shop tried to meet by stocking newer local club hits.

In a 1986 interview, when Rocky Jones, the club DJ who ran Chicago-based DJ International Records, was asked about the "house" moniker, and he did not mention Importes Etc., Frankie Knuckles, or the Warehouse by name. However, he agreed that "house" was a regional catch-all term for dance music, and that it was once synonymous with older disco music before it became a way to refer to "new" dance music.

Larry Heard, a.k.a. "Mr. Fingers", claims that the term "house" came from DJs creating music in their house or at home using synthesizers and drum machines, such as the Roland TB-303, Roland TR-808, and TR-909. These synthesizers were used to create the acid house subgenre. Juan Atkins, a pioneer of Detroit techno, claims the term "house" reflected the association of particular tracks with particular clubs and DJs, considered their "house" records.

== Dance style ==
At least three styles of dancing are associated with early house music: jacking, footwork, and lofting. These styles include a variety of techniques and sub-styles, including skating, stomping, vosho, pouting cat, and shuffle steps (also see Melbourne shuffle). House music dancing styles can include movements from many other forms of dance, such as waacking, voguing, capoeira, jazz dance, Lindy Hop, tap dance, and even modern dance. House dancing is associated with a complete freedom of expression.

One of the primary elements in house dancing is "the jack" or "jacking" — a style created in the early days of Chicago house that left its trace in numerous record titles such as "Time to Jack" by Chip E. from the Jack Trax EP (1985), "Jack'n the House" by Farley "Jackmaster" Funk (1985) or "Jack Your Body" by Steve "Silk" Hurley (1986). It involves moving the torso forward and backward in a rippling motion matching the beat of the music, as if a wave were passing through it.

== Social and political aspects ==
Early house lyrics contained generally positive, uplifting messages, but spoke especially to those who were considered to be outsiders, especially African Americans, Latinos, and the gay subculture. The house music dance scene was one of the most integrated and progressive spaces in the 1980s; the black and gay populations, as well as other minority groups, were able to dance together in a positive environment.

House music DJs aimed to create a "dream world of emotions" with "stories, keywords and sounds", which helped to "glue" communities together. Many house tracks encourage the audience to "release yourself" or "let yourself go", which is further encouraged by the continuous dancing, "incessant beat", and use of club drugs, which can create a trance-like effect on dancers. Frankie Knuckles once said that the Warehouse club in Chicago was like "church for people who have fallen from grace". House record producer Marshall Jefferson compared it to "old-time religion in the way that people just get happy and screamin'". The role of a house DJ has been compared to a "secular type of priest".

Some house lyrics contained messages calling for equality, unity, and freedom of expression beyond racial or sexual differences (e.g. "Can You Feel It" by Fingers Inc., 1987, or "Follow Me" by Aly-Us, 1992). Later on in the 1990s, independently from the Chicago scene, the idea of Peace, Love, Unity & Respect (PLUR) became a widespread set of principles for the rave culture.

== History ==
=== Influences and precursors ===
One of the main influences of house was disco, house music having been defined as a genre which "...picked up where disco left off in the late 1970's". Like disco DJs, house DJs used a "slow mix" to "lin[k] records together" into a mix. In the post-disco club culture during the early 1980s, DJs from the gay scene made their tracks "less pop-oriented", with a more mechanical, repetitive beat and deeper basslines, and many tracks were made without vocals, or with wordless melodies. Disco became so popular by the late 1970s that record companies pushed even non-disco artists (R&B and soft rock acts, for example) to record disco songs. When the backlash against disco started, known as "Disco Demolition Night", held in Chicago, ironically the city where house music would be created a few years later, dance music went from being produced by major labels to being created by DJs in the underground club scene. That is until several years later by 1988, when major labels would begin signing acts from this new dance genre.

While disco was associated with lush orchestration, with string orchestra, flutes and horn sections, various later disco songs incorporated sounds produced with synthesizers and electronic drum machines, and some compositions were entirely electronic: one of the earliest examples includes Italian composer Giorgio Moroder's late 1970s productions such as Donna Summer's hit single "I Feel Love" (1977), or albums like Cerrone's Supernature (1977), Kraftwerk's The Man-Machine (1978), Yellow Magic Orchestra's synth- and disco-pop productions from Yellow Magic Orchestra (1978) or Solid State Survivor (1979), and several early 1980s productions by Hi-NRG groups like Lime, Trans-X and Bobby O.

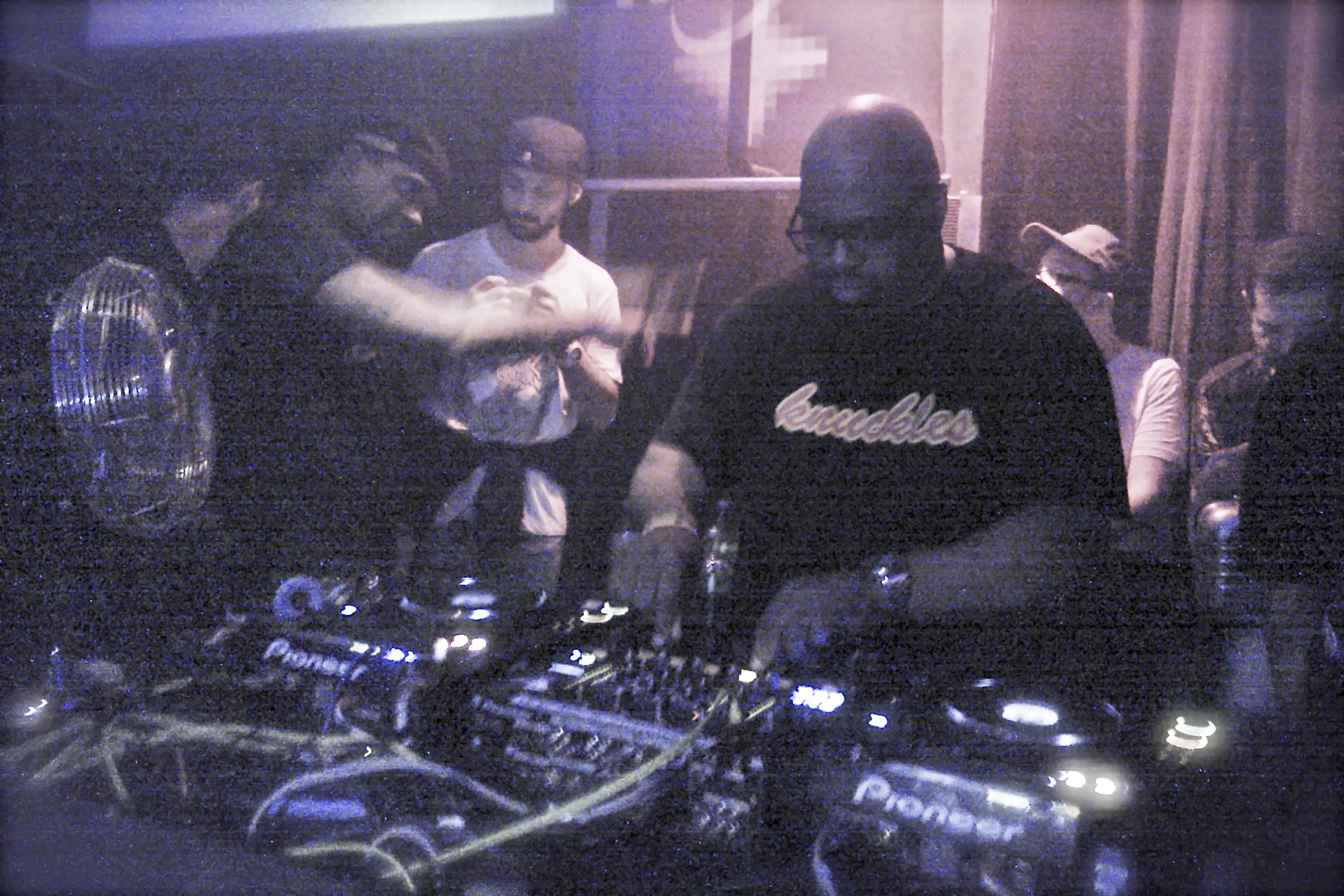
Frankie Knuckles (pictured in 2012) played an important role in developing house music in Chicago during the 1980s.

Also important for the development of house were audio mixing and editing techniques earlier explored by disco, garage house and post-disco DJs, record producers, and audio engineers such as Walter Gibbons, Tom Moulton, Jim Burgess, Larry Levan, M & M, and others.

While most post-disco disc jockeys primarily stuck to playing their conventional ensemble and playlist of dance records, Frankie Knuckles and Ron Hardy, two influential DJs of house music, were known for their unusual and non-mainstream playlists and mixing. Knuckles, often credited as "the Godfather of House" and resident DJ at the Warehouse club in Chicago from 1977 to 1982, worked primarily with early disco music with a hint of new and different post-punk or post-disco music. Knuckles started out as a disco DJ, but when he moved from New York City to Chicago, he changed from the typical disco mixing style of playing records one after another; instead, he mixed different songs together, including Philadelphia soul and Euro disco. He also explored adding a drum machine and a reel-to-reel tape player so he could create new tracks, often with a boosted deep register and faster tempos. Knuckles said: "Kraftwerk were main components in the creation of house music in Chicago. Back in the early '80s, I mixed our '80s Philly sound with the electro beats of Kraftwerk and the Electronic body music bands of Europe."

Ron Hardy produced unconventional DIY mixtapes which he later played straight-on in the successor of the Warehouse, the Music Box (reopened and renamed in 1983 after Knuckles left). Like Frankie Knuckles, Hardy "combined certain sounds, remixing tracks with added synths and drum machines", all "refracted through the futurist lens of European music". Marshall Jefferson, who would later appear with the 1986 house classic "Move Your Body (The House Music Anthem)" (originally released on Trax Records), describes how he got involved in house music after hearing Ron Hardy's music in the Music Box:

"I wasn't even into dance music before I went to the Music Box [...]. I was into rock and roll. We would get drunk and listen to rock and roll. We didn't give a fuck, we were like 'Disco Sucks!' and all that. I hated dance music 'cos I couldn't dance. I thought dance music was kind of wimpy, until I heard it at like Music Box volume."

— Marshall Jefferson

A precursor to house music is the Colonel Abrams' hit song "Trapped", which was produced by Richard James Burgess in 1984 and has been referred to as a proto-house track and a precursor to "garage house music", a subgenre also called "garage music" that actually consisted of the New York City/New Jersey scene of the main genre.

The electronic instrumentation and minimal arrangement of Charanjit Singh's Synthesizing: Ten Ragas to a Disco Beat (1982), an album of Indian ragas performed in a disco style and anticipated the sounds of acid house music, but it is not known to have had any influence on the genre prior to the album's rediscovery in the 21st century. According to Hillegonda C. Rietveld, "elements of hip hop/rap music can be found in contemporary house tracks", with hip hop acting as an "accent or inflection" that is inserted into the house sound.

The constant bass drum in house music may have arisen from DJs experimenting with adding drum machines to their live mixes at clubs, underneath the records they were playing.

=== 1980s: Chicago house, acid house and deep house ===
An honorary street name sign in Chicago for house music and the seminal DJ Frankie Knuckles

In the early 1980s, Chicago radio jocks Hot Mix 5 from WBMX radio station (among them Farley "Jackmaster" Funk), and club DJs Ron Hardy and Frankie Knuckles played a range of styles of dance music, including older disco records (mostly Philly disco and Salsoul tracks), electro funk tracks by artists such as Afrika Bambaataa, newer Italo disco, Arthur Baker, and John Robie, and electronic pop. Some DJs made and played their own edits of their favorite songs on reel-to-reel tape, and sometimes mixed in electronic effects, drum machines, synthesizers and other rhythmic electronic instrumentation.

The hypnotic electronic dance song "On and On", produced in 1984 by Chicago DJ Jesse Saunders and co-written by Vince Lawrence, had typical elements of the early house sound, such as the Roland TB-303 bass synthesizer and minimal vocals, as well as a Roland TR-808 drum machine and a Korg Poly-61 synthesizer. It also utilized the bassline from Player One's disco record "Space Invaders" (1979). "On and On" is sometimes cited as the "first house record", even though it was a remake of a Disco Bootleg "On and On" by Florida producer Mach. Other examples from around that time, such as J.M. Silk's "Music is the Key" (1985), have also been referred to as the first house tracks.

Starting in 1985 and 1986, more and more Chicago DJs began producing and releasing original compositions. These compositions used newly affordable electronic instruments and enhanced styles of disco and other dance music they already favored. These homegrown productions were played on Chicago radio stations and in local clubs catering mainly to black, Mexican American, and gay audiences. Subgenres of house, including deep house and acid house, quickly emerged and gained traction.

Deep house's origins can be traced to Chicago producer Mr. Fingers's relatively jazzy, soulful recordings "Mystery of Love" (1985) and "Can You Feel It?" (1986). According to author Richie Unterberger, it moved house music away from its "posthuman tendencies back towards the lush" soulful sound of early disco music.

Acid house, a rougher and more abstract subgenre, arose from Chicago artists' experiments with the squelchy sounds of the Roland TB-303 bass synthesizer that define the genre. Its origin on vinyl is generally cited as Phuture's "Acid Tracks" (Trax Records, 1987). Phuture, a group founded by Nathan "DJ Pierre" Jones, Earl "Spanky" Smith Jr., and Herbert "Herb J" Jackson, is credited with having been the first to use the TB-303 in the house music context. The group's 12-minute "Acid Tracks" was recorded to tape and played by DJ Ron Hardy at the Music Box, supposedly already by 1985. Hardy once played it four times over the course of an evening until the crowd responded favorably.

Club play of house tracks by pioneering Chicago DJs such as Ron Hardy and Lil Louis, local dance music record shops such as Importes Etc., State Street Records, Loop Records, Gramaphone Records and the popular Hot Mix 5 shows on radio station WBMX-FM helped popularize house music in Chicago. Later, visiting DJs and producers from Detroit fell into the genre. Trax Records and DJ International Records, Chicago labels with wider distribution, helped popularize house music inside and outside of Chicago.

The first major success of house music outside the U.S. is considered to be Farley "Jackmaster" Funk's "Love Can't Turn Around" (feat. Jesse Saunders and performed by Darryl Pandy), which peaked at number 10 in the UK singles chart in 1986. Around that time, UK record labels started releasing house music by Chicago acts, but as the genre grew popular, the UK itself became one of the new hot spots for house, acid house and techno music, experiencing the so-called second summer of love between 1988 and 1989.

==== Detroit and techno ====
In Detroit during the early and mid-1980s, a new kind of electronic dance music began to emerge around Juan Atkins, Derrick May and Kevin Saunderson, known as the Belleville Three. The artists fused eclectic, futuristic sounds into a signature Detroit dance sound that was a main influence for the later techno genre. Their music included strong influences from Chicago house, although the term "house" played a less important role in Detroit than in Chicago, and the term "techno" was established instead. In early 1983, a white-label single for Depeche Mode's single "Get the Balance Right!" found its way to Saunderson and May, who both played the single in clubs. Saunderson later said that the song was "the first house [music] record", although even the members of Depeche Mode itself were dubious and amused by that suggestion. One of their most successful hits was a vocal house track named "Big Fun" by Inner City, a group produced by Kevin Saunderson, in 1988.

Another major and even earlier influence on the Detroit artists was electronic music in the tradition of Germany's Kraftwerk. Atkins had released electro music in that style with his group Cybotron as early as 1981. Cybotron's best known songs are "Cosmic Cars" (1982) and "Clear" (1983); a 1984 release was titled "Techno City". In 1988, Atkins produced the track "Techno Music", which was featured on an influential compilation that was initially planned to be named "The House Sound of Detroit", but was renamed into "Techno! The New Dance Sound of Detroit" after Atkins' song.

The 1987 song "Strings of Life" by Derrick May (under the name Rhythm Is Rhythm) represented a darker, more intellectual strain of early Detroit electronic dance music. It is considered a classic in both the house and techno genre and shows the connection and the "boundary between house and techno." It made way to what was later known as "techno" in the internationally known sense of the word, referring to a harder, faster, colder, more machine-driven and minimal sound than house, as played by Detroit's Underground Resistance and Jeff Mills.

==== UK: Acid house, rave culture and the Second Summer of Love ====
A badge bearing a smiley, a symbol of the 1980s acid house scene in the UK

With house music already important in the 1980s dance club scene, eventually house penetrated the UK singles chart. London DJ "Evil" Eddie Richards spun at dance parties as resident at the Clink Street club. Richards' approach to house focuses on the deep basslines. Nicknamed the UK's "Godfather of House", he and Clink co-residents Kid Batchelor and Mr. C played a key role in early UK house. House first charted in the UK in Wolverhampton following the success of the Northern Soul scene. The record generally credited as the first house hit in the UK was Farley "Jackmaster" Funk's "Love Can't Turn Around", which reached number 10 in the UK singles chart in September 1986.

In January 1987, Chicago DJ/artist Steve "Silk" Hurley's "Jack Your Body" reached number one in the UK, showing it was possible for house music to achieve crossover success in the main singles chart. The same month also saw Raze enter the top 20 with "Jack the Groove", and several other house hits reached the top ten that year. Stock Aitken Waterman (SAW) expensively produced productions for Mel and Kim, including the number-one hit "Respectable", added elements of house to their previous Europop sound. SAW session group Mirage scored top-ten hits with "Jack Mix II" and "Jack Mix IV", medleys of previous electro and Europop hits rearranged in a house music style. Key labels in the rise of house music in the UK included:

- Jack Trax, which specialized in licensing US club hits for the British market (and released an influential series of compilation albums)
- Rhythm King, which was set up as a hip hop label but also issued house records
- Jive Records' Club Records imprint

In March 1987, the UK tour of influential US DJs such as Knuckles, Jefferson, Fingers Inc. (Heard), and Adonis on the DJ International Tour boosted house's popularity in the UK. Following the success of MARRS' "Pump Up The Volume" in October, from 1987 to 1989, UK acts such as The Beatmasters, Krush, Coldcut, Yazz, Bomb The Bass, S-Express, and Italy's Black Box opened the doors to house music success on the UK charts. Early British house music quickly set itself apart from the original Chicago house sound. Many of the early hits were based on sample montage, and unlike the US soulful vocals, in UK house, rap was often used for vocals (far more than in the US), and humor and wit was an important element.

The second best-selling British single of 1988 was an acid house record, the Coldcut-produced "The Only Way Is Up" by Yazz. One of the early club anthems, "Promised Land" by Joe Smooth, was covered and charted within a week by UK band The Style Council. Europeans embraced house, and began booking important American house DJs to play at the big clubs, such as Ministry of Sound, whose resident, Justin Berkmann brought in US pioneer Larry Levan.

The house music club scene in cities such as Birmingham, Leeds, Sheffield, Wolverhampton, and London were provided with dance tracks by many underground pirate radio stations. Club DJs also brought in new house styles, which helped bolster this music genre. The earliest UK house and techno record labels, such as Warp Records and Network Records (formed out of Kool Kat records), helped introduce American and later Italian dance music to Britain. These labels also promoted UK dance music acts. By the end of the 1980s, UK DJs Jenö, Thomas, Markie and Garth moved to San Francisco and called their group the Wicked Crew. The Wicked Crew's dance sound transmitted UK styles to the US, which helped to trigger the birth of the US west coast's rave scene.

The manager of Manchester's Factory nightclub and co-owner of The Haçienda, Tony Wilson, also promoted acid house culture on his weekly TV show. The UK midlands also embraced the late 1980s house scene with illegal parties and raves and more legal dance clubs such as The Hummingbird.

==== Chicago's second wave: Hip house and ghetto house ====
While the acid house hype spawned in the UK and Europe, in Chicago it reached its peak around 1988 and then declined in popularity. Instead, a crossover of house and hip-hop music, known as hip house, became popular. Tyree Cooper's single "Turn Up the Bass" featuring Kool Rock Steady from 1988 was an influential breakthrough for this subgenre, although the British trio the Beatmasters claimed having invented the genre with their 1986 release "Rok da House". Another notable figure in the hip house scene was Fast Eddie with "Hip House" and "Yo Yo Get Funky!" (both 1988). Even Farley "Jackmaster" Funk engaged in the genre, releasing "Free at Last", a song to free James Brown from jail that featured The Hip House Syndicate, in 1989, and producing a Real Hip House compilation on his label, House Records, in 1990.

The early 1990s saw new Chicago house artists emerge, such as Armando Gallop, who had released seminal acid house records since 1987, but became even more influential by co-founding the new Warehouse nightclub in Chicago (on 738 W. Randolph Street) in which he also was resident DJ from 1992 until 1994, and founding Warehouse Records in 1988.

Another important figure during the early to mid-1990s and until the 2000s was DJ and producer Paul Johnson, who released the Warehouse-anthem "Welcome to the Warehouse" on Armando's label in 1994 in collaboration with Armando himself. He also had part in the development of an entirely new kind of Chicago house sound, "ghetto house", which was prominently released and popularized through the Dance Mania record label. It was originally founded by Jesse Saunders in 1985 but passed on to Raymond Barney in 1988. It featured notable ghetto house artists like DJ Funk, DJ Deeon, DJ Milton, Paul Johnson and others. The label is regarded as hugely influential in the history of Chicago house music, and has been described as "ghetto house's Motown".

One of the prototypes for Dance Mania's new ghetto house sound was the single "(It's Time for the) Percolator" by Cajmere, also known as Green Velvet, from 1992. Cajmere started the labels Cajual Records and Relief Records, the latter combining the sound of Chicago, acid, and ghetto house with the harder sound of techno. By the early 1990s, artists of note on those two labels included Dajae, DJ Sneak, Derrick Carter, DJ Rush, Paul Johnson, Joe Lewis, and Glenn Underground.

==== New York and New Jersey: Garage house and the "Jersey sound" ====
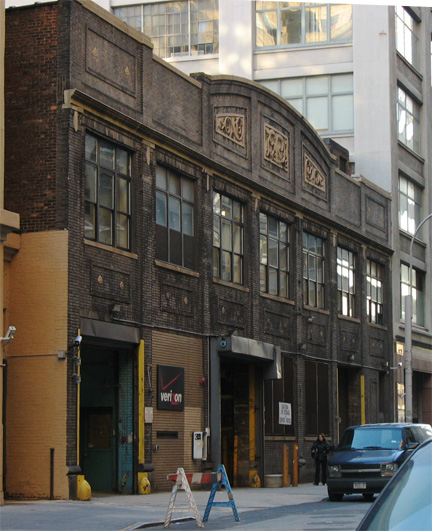
Building in New York City where the Paradise Garage nightclub was located

While house became popular in UK and continental Europe, the scene in the US had still not expanded beyond a small number of clubs in Chicago, Detroit, New York City, and Newark. In New York and Newark, the terms "garage house", "garage music", or simply "garage", and "Jersey sound", or "New Jersey house", were coined for a deeper, more soulful, R&B-derived subgenre of house that was developed in the Paradise Garage nightclub in New York City and Club Zanzibar in Newark, New Jersey, during the early-to-mid 1980s. It is argued that garage house predates the development of Chicago house, as it is relatively closer to disco than other dance styles. As Chicago house gained international popularity, New York and New Jersey's music scene was distinguished from the "house" umbrella.

In comparison to other forms of house music, garage house, and Jersey sound include more gospel-influenced piano riffs and female vocals. The genre was popular in the 1980s in the United States and in the 1990s in the United Kingdom. DJs playing it include Tony Humphries at Club Zanzibar, Larry Levan, who was resident DJ at the Paradise Garage from 1977 to 1987, Todd Terry, Kerri Chandler, Masters at Work, Junior Vasquez, and others.

In the late 1980s, Nu Groove Records launched and nurtured the careers of Rheji Burrell and Rhano Burrell, collectively known as Burrell (after a brief stay on Virgin America via Timmy Regisford and Frank Mendez). Nu Groove also had a stable of other NYC underground scene DJs. The Burrells created the "New York Underground" sound of house, and they did more than 30 releases on this label featuring this sound.

The emergence of New York's DJ and producer Todd Terry in 1988 demonstrated the continuum from the underground disco approach to a new and commercially successful house sound. Terry's cover of Class Action's "Weekend" (mixed by Larry Levan) shows how Terry drew on newer hip-hop influences, such as the quicker sampling and the more rugged basslines.

==== Ibiza ====
House was also being developed by DJs and record producers in the booming dance club scene in Ibiza, notably when DJ Alfredo, the father of Balearic house, began his residency at Amnesia in 1983. While no house artists or labels came from Ibiza at the time, mixing experiments and innovations done by Ibiza DJs helped to influence the house style. By the mid-1980s, a distinct Balearic mix of house was discernible. Several influential clubs in Ibiza, such as Amnesia, with DJ Alfredo at the decks, were playing a mix of rock, pop, disco, and house. These clubs, fuelled by their distinctive sound and copious consumption of the club drug Ecstasy (MDMA), began to influence the British scene. By late 1987, DJs such as Trevor Fung, Paul Oakenfold and Danny Rampling were bringing the Ibiza sound to key UK clubs such as the Haçienda in Manchester. Ibiza influences also spread to DJs working London clubs, such as Shoom in Southwark, Heaven, Future, and Spectrum.

==== Other regional scenes ====
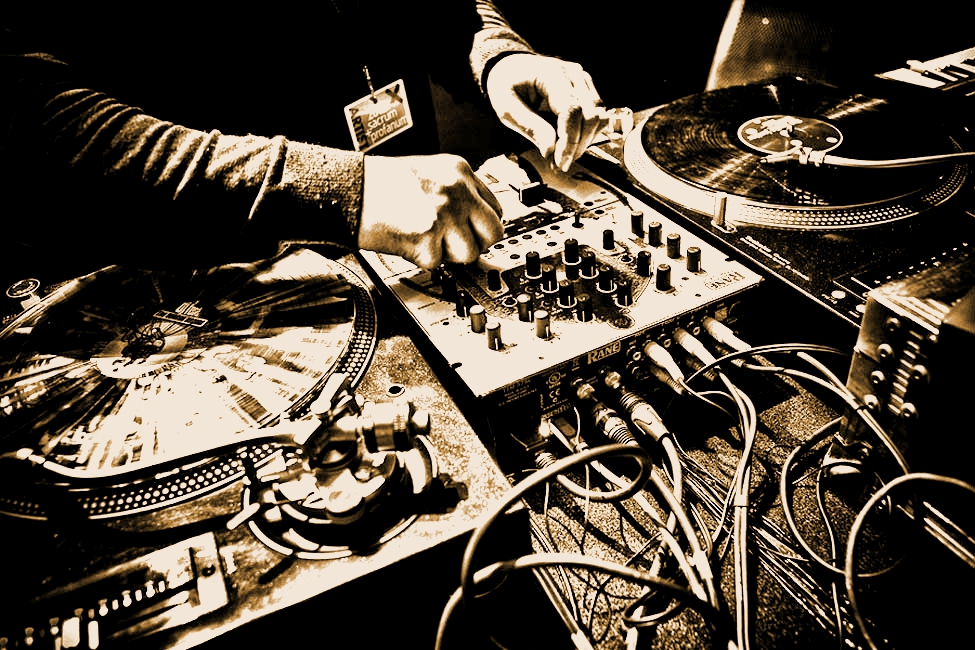
This photo of a deep house DJ shows the pair of turntables and the DJ mixer in between.

By the late 1980s, house DJing and production had moved to the US's west coast, particularly to San Francisco, Oakland, Los Angeles, Fresno, San Diego, and Seattle. Los Angeles saw an explosion of underground raves, where DJs mixed dance tracks. Los Angeles DJs Marques Wyatt and Billy Long spun at Jewel's Catch One. In 1989, the Los-Angeles-based former EBN-OZN singer/rapper Robert Ozn started indie house label One Voice Records. Ozn released the Mike "Hitman" Wilson remix of Dada Nada's "Haunted House", which garnered club and mix show radio play in Chicago, Detroit, and New York as well as in the UK and France. The record went up to number five on the Billboard Club Chart, marking it as the first house record by a white artist to chart in the US. Dada Nada, the moniker for Ozn's solo act, did his first releases in 1990, using a jazz-based deep house style. The Frankie Knuckles and David Morales remix of Dada Nada's "Deep Love" (One Voice Records in the US, Polydor in the UK), featuring Ozn's lush, crooning vocals and jazzy improvisational solos by muted trumpet, underscored deep house's progression into a genre that integrated jazz and pop songwriting and song forms (unlike acid house and techno). The Twilight Zone (1980–89) located on Richmond Street in Toronto's entertainment district was the first after hours club to regularly feature New York and Chicago DJs that first spun house music in Canada. The venue was the first international gig destination for both Frankie Knuckles and David Morales. One of the club's owners, Tony Assoon, would make regular trips to New York in order to purchase funk, underground disco and house records to play on his regular Saturday night slot.

==== The Montreal Scene ====
Historically deeply influenced by musical trends coming from England, France, and the US, Montreal has developed a distinct house music scene.

Shaped more specifically by the impact of UK's techno scene, France's French Touch movement, and American DJs and club owners such as Angel Moraes, David Morales, and Danny Tenaglia, the city has evolved to become a distinct dance music hub.

Ever since the middle of the 1990s and early 2000s, an ever-growing number of house music festivals take place in the city throughout the year, including Igloofest, Nuit blanche, Piknic Electronik, Mutek, Ile Soniq, Montréal Pride, and the Black and Blue festival.

==== South Africa ====
Kwaito was created during the 1980s, in South Africa during the collapse or near-end of the apartheid regime. It was popularized by the likes of Trompies, Mdu Masilela, Arthur Mafokate, Boom Shaka, Mandoza, Brown Dash, Oskido and many others. Brenda Fassie released a song titled, "Le Kwaito" and Boom Shaka, Bongo Maffin as well as TKZee performed in London.

=== 1990s ===
In 1990, Italo house group Black Box's big hit "Everybody Everybody" reached US Billboard Hot 100. In Britain, further experiments in the genre boosted its appeal. House and rave clubs such as Lakota and Cream emerged across Britain, hosting house and dance scene events. The 'chilling out' concept developed in Britain with ambient house albums such as The KLF's Chill Out and Analogue Bubblebath by Aphex Twin. The Godskitchen superclub brand also began in the midst of the early 1990s rave scene. After initially hosting small nights in Cambridge and Northampton, the associated events scaled up at the Sanctuary Music Arena in Milton Keynes, in Birmingham, and in Leeds. A new indie dance scene also emerged in the 1990s. In New York, bands such as Deee-Lite, with Bootsy Collins, furthered house's international influence.

In England, one of the few licensed venues was the Eclipse, which attracted people from up and down the country as it was open until the early hours. Due to the lack of licensed, legal dance event venues, house music promoters began organising illegal events in unused warehouses, aeroplane hangars, and in the countryside. The Criminal Justice and Public Order Act 1994 was a government attempt to ban large rave dance events featuring music with "repetitive beats", due to law enforcement allegations that these events were associated with illegal club drugs. There were a number of "Kill the Bill" demonstrations by rave and electronic dance music fans. The Spiral Tribe dance event at Castle Morten was the last of these illegal raves, as the bill, which became law in November 1994, made unauthorised house music dance events illegal in the UK. Despite the new law, the music continued to grow and change, as typified by Leftfield with "Release the Pressure", which introduced dub and reggae into the house sound.

A new generation of clubs such as Liverpool's Cream and the Ministry of Sound were opened to provide a venue for more commercial house sounds. Major record companies began to open "superclubs" promoting their own groups and acts. These superclubs entered into sponsorship deals initially with fast food, soft drink, and clothing companies. Flyers in clubs in Ibiza often sported many corporate logos from sponsors. A new subgenre, Chicago hard house, was developed by DJs such as Bad Boy Bill, DJ Lynnwood, DJ Irene, and Richard "Humpty" Vission, mixing elements of Chicago house, funky house, and hard house. Additionally, producers such as George Centeno, Darren Ramirez, and Martin "Nemesis" Cairo developed the Los Angeles Hard House sound. Similar to gabber or hardcore techno from the Netherlands, this was associated with the "rebel", underground club subculture of the time.

Towards the end of the 1990s and into the 2000s, French DJ/producers such as Daft Punk, Bob Sinclar, Stardust, Cassius, St. Germain and DJ Falcon began producing a new sound in Paris' club scene. Together, they laid the groundwork for what would be known as the French house movement. They combined the harder-edged-yet-soulful philosophy of Chicago house with the melodies of obscure funk records. By using new digital production techniques blended with the retro sound of old-school analog synthesizers, they created a new sound and style that influenced house music around the world.

Afro house (ostensibly or was also simply referred to as 'house' before being categorized or titled as an official sub-genre) was emerging in South Africa, during or slightly before this period according to various natives especially due to seemingly the emergence simultaneously during or shortly after kwaito and was being popularized globally in various locations such as in the United States. Former, kwaito artists such as Oskido and DJ Tira are also associated with, the genre.

=== 2000s ===
Chicago Mayor Richard M. Daley proclaimed 10 August 2005, to be "House Unity Day" in Chicago, in celebration of the "21st anniversary of house music" (actually the 21st anniversary of the founding of Trax Records, an independent Chicago-based house label). The proclamation recognized Chicago as the original home of house music and that the music's original creators "were inspired by the love of their city, with the dream that someday their music would spread a message of peace and unity throughout the world". DJs such as Frankie Knuckles, Marshall Jefferson, Paul Johnson, and Mickey Oliver celebrated the proclamation at the Summer Dance Series, an event organized by Chicago's Department of Cultural Affairs.

It was during this decade that vocal house became firmly established, both in the underground and as part of the pop market, and labels such as Defected Records, Roulé, and Om were at the forefront of the emerging sound. In the mid-2000s, fusion genres such as electro house and fidget house emerged. This fusion is apparent in the crossover of musical styles by artists such as Dennis Ferrer and Booka Shade, with the former's production style having evolved from the New York soulful house scene and the latter's roots in techno. Numerous live performance events dedicated to house music were founded during the course of the decade, including Shambhala Music Festival and major industry sponsored events like Miami's Winter Music Conference. The genre even gained popularity through events like Creamfields. In the late 2000s, house style witnessed renewed chart success thanks to acts such as Daft Punk, Deadmau5, Fedde Le Grand, David Guetta, and Calvin Harris.

Afro house increased in popularity in other regions such as London and the genre's solidified emergence accelerated, resulting in it becoming preeminent, it also appeared to have been attributed to "giving rise to" the UK funky, scene.

=== 2010s ===
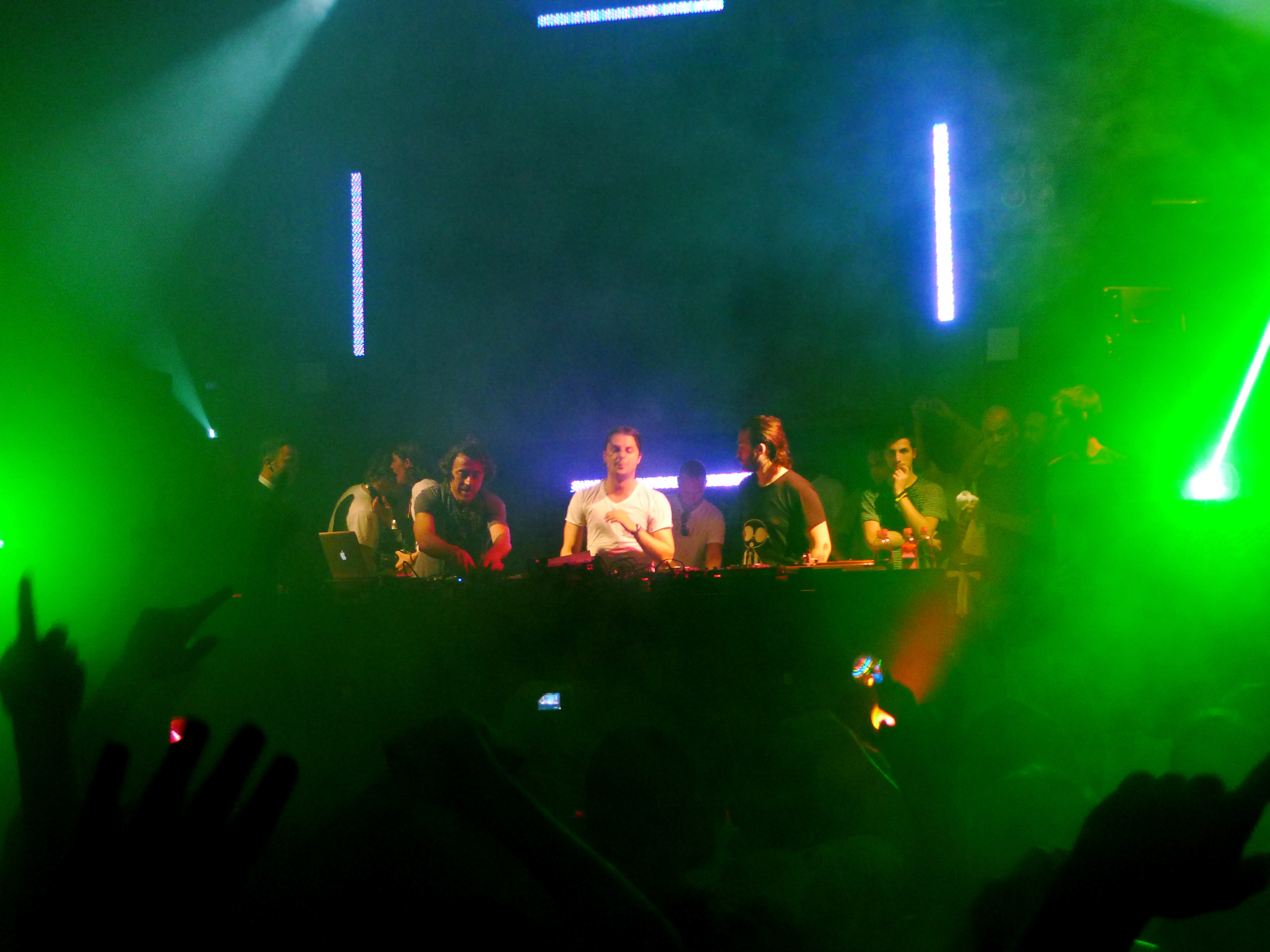
Swedish House Mafia and Italian DJ Benny Benassi performing in 2011.

During the 2010s, multiple new sounds in house music were developed by DJs, producers, and artists. Sweden pioneered the "Mainstage progressive house" genre with the emergence of Sebastian Ingrosso, Axwell, and Steve Angello. While all three artists had solo careers, when they formed a trio called Swedish House Mafia, it showed that house could still produce chart-topping hits, such as their 2012 single "Don't You Worry Child", which cracked the Billboard top 10. Avicii was a Swedish DJ/artist known for his hits such as "Hey Brother", "Wake Me Up", "Addicted to You", "The Days", "The Nights", "Levels", "Waiting for Love", "Without You", and "I Could Be the One" with Nicky Romero. Fellow Swedish DJ/artist Alesso collaborated with Calvin Harris, Usher, and David Guetta. In France, Justice blended garage and alternative rock influences into their pop-infused house tracks, creating a big and funky sound.

During the 2010s, in the UK and in the US, many records labels stayed true to the original house music sound from the 1980s. It includes labels like Dynamic Music, Defected Records, Dirtybird, Fuse London, Exploited, Pampa, Cajual Records, Hot Creations, Get Physical, and Pets Recordings.

From the Netherlands coalesced the concept of "Dirty Dutch", an electro house subgenre characterized by abrasive lead synths and darker arpeggios, with prominent DJs being Chuckie, Hardwell, Laidback Luke, Afrojack, R3hab, Bingo Players, Quintino, and Alvaro. Elsewhere, fusion genres derivative of 2000s progressive house returned, especially with the help of DJs/artists Calvin Harris, David Guetta, Zedd, Eric Prydz, Mat Zo, Above & Beyond, and Fonzerelli in Europe.

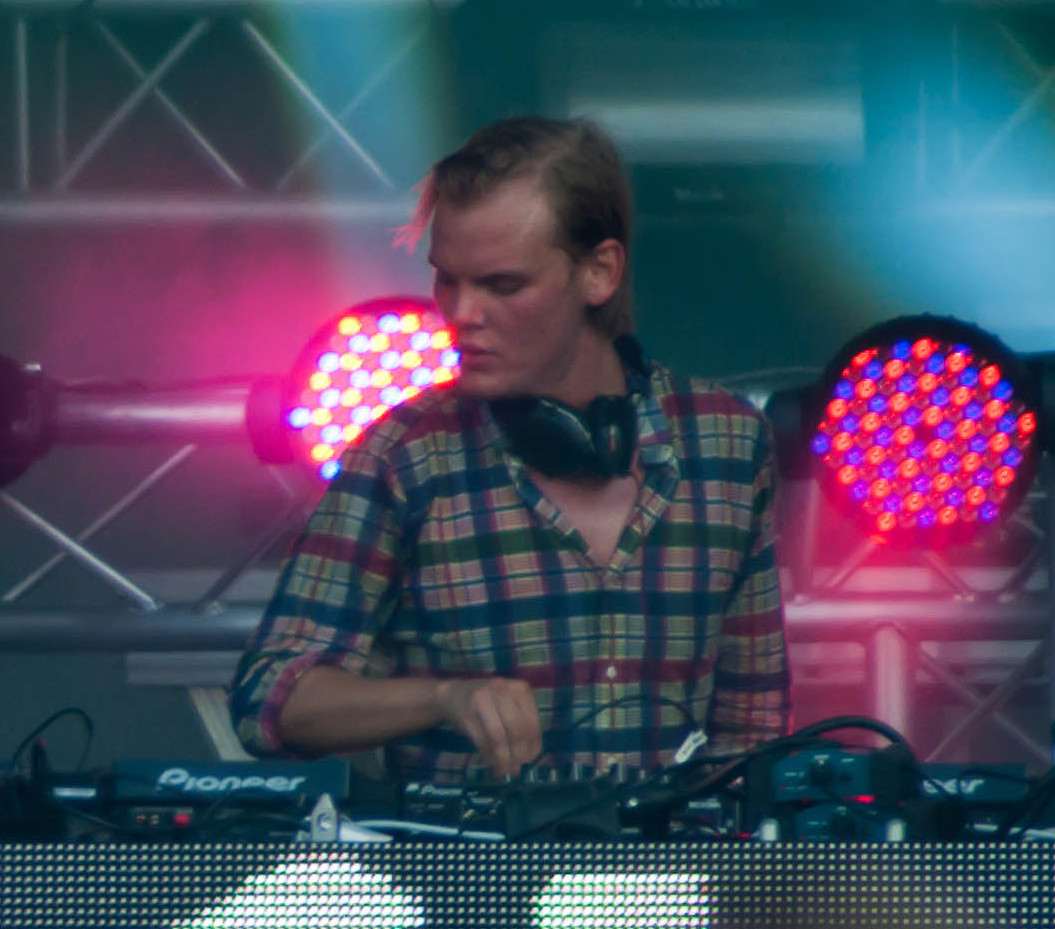
Avicii in 2011 in Paris

Diplo, a DJ/producer from Tupelo, Mississippi, blended underground sounds with mainstream styles. As he came from the southern US, Diplo fused house music with rap and dance/pop, while also integrating more obscure southern US genres. Other North Americans playing house music include the Canadian Deadmau5 (known for his unusual mask and unique musical style), Kaskade, Steve Aoki, Porter Robinson, and Wolfgang Gartner. The growing popularity of such artists led to the emergence of electro house and progressive house sounds in popular music, such as singles like David Guetta feat. Avicii's "Sunshine" and Axwell's remix of "In The Air".

Big room house became increasingly popular since 2010, through international dance music festivals such as Tomorrowland, Ultra Music Festival, and Electric Daisy Carnival. In addition to these popular examples of house, there has also been a reunification of contemporary house and its roots. Many hip hop and R&B artists also turned to house music to add a mass appeal and dance floor energy to the music they produce. Tropical house went onto the top 40 on the UK singles Chart in 2015 with artists such as Kygo and Jonas Blue. In the mid-2010s, the influences of house began to also be seen in Korean K-pop music, examples of this being f(x)'s single "4 Walls" and SHINee's title track, "View".

Later in the 2010s, a more traditional house sound came to the forefront of the mainstream in the UK, with Calvin Harris's singles "One Kiss" and "Promises", with the latter also incorporating elements of nu-disco and Italo house. These singles both went to No.1 in the UK.

Gqom was developed from kwaito predominantly in Durban, it was popularized globally as artists who popularized and pioneered the genre for instance Babes Wodumo and Distruction Boyz were nominated for the MTV Europe Music Award for Best African Act, collaborated with Major Lazer, featured on the Black Panther (soundtrack) and DJ Lag, The Lion King: The Gift, album.

Afro tech presumably began to initially emerge as artists like Black Coffee for example ostensibly started experimenting with what appeared to be a departed sound, similar to afro house however led by a more techno-like sound. Moreover, seemingly definitely not conventional techno nor deep house such as demonstrated in the song "We Dance Again" featuring Nakhane. The song won the Breakthrough of the Year award at the DJ Awards. The genre is both a sub-genre as well as fusion genre of afro house, there are also opinions that it is "still" afro house.

=== 2020s ===
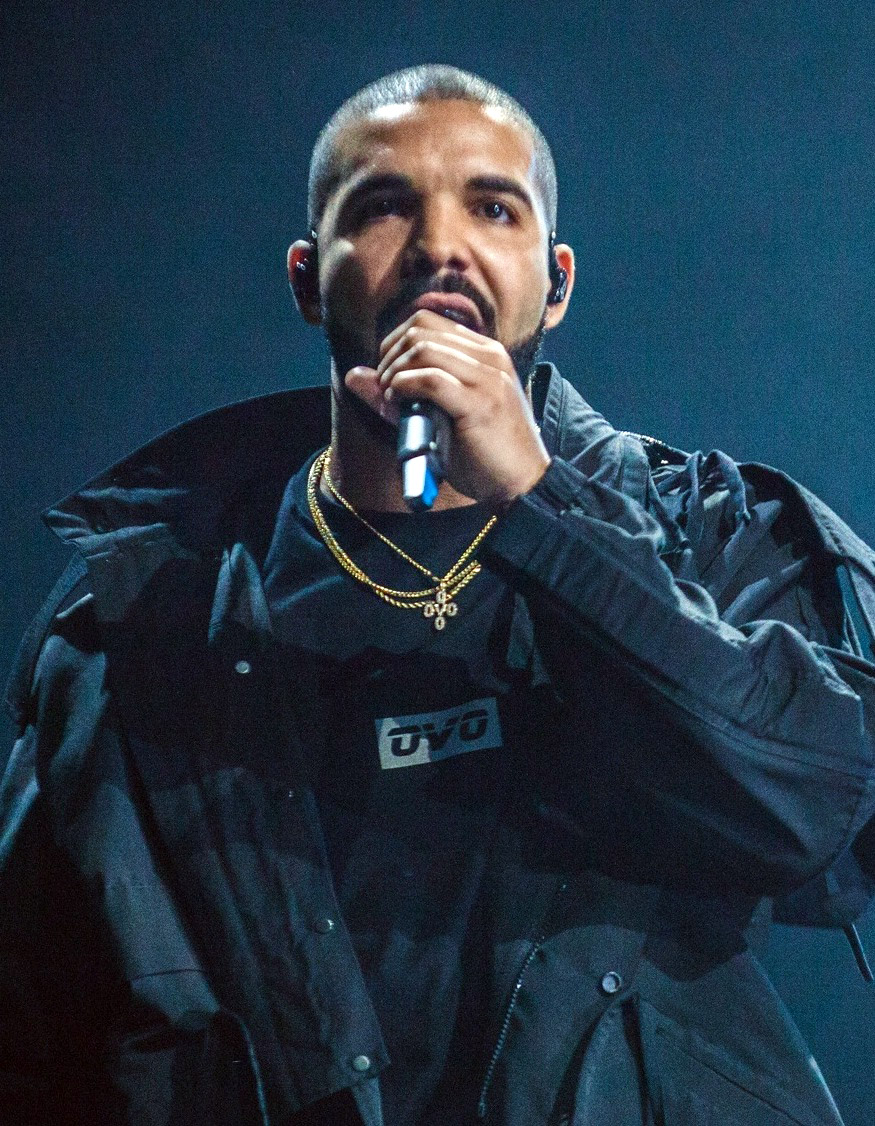
Drake (pictured in 2016) released a house album Honestly, Nevermind in 2022.

In the late 2010s and early 2020s, exacerbated by the COVID-19 pandemic, one of the South African offshoots of house music, called amapiano, became popular first in South Africa, and then later spread to London and elsewhere worldwide, largely due to online music distribution. Amapiano draws heavily from earlier kwaito house music of South Africa and from jazz and chill-out music. In 2022, the music portal Beatport added an "amapiano" genre to its catalogue.

During the late 2010s and early 2020s and partially due to YouTube music channels, closely related house subgenres Brazilian bass and slap house became popular worldwide, drawing from deep house and menacing basslines of tech house.

Fred Again, United Kingdom-born DJ, released a song in 2021 called Marea (We've Lost Dancing) about the pandemic. He wrote this song to express his sadness about losing the house music scene including clubs, music festivals, and being able to dance with one another. This is another example of how COVID-19 affected the house music scene.

In 2019, the DJ Awards introduced an additional new Afro house category. Da Capo won the award.

In 2020, American singer Lady Gaga released Chromatica, which was her return to her dance roots towards deep house, French house, electro house, and disco house.

In 2022, Canadian rapper Drake released Honestly, Nevermind, which was a departure from his signature hip hop, R&B, and trap music sound, and moved towards house music and its derivativates: Jersey club, and ballroom. South African, artist Black Coffee and German music producers, collective Keinemusik(Crue/Kloud) were amongst the list of co-producers on the album. American singer Beyoncé's album Renaissance, also released in 2022, incorporated ballroom house and gqom.

== See also ==
- List of electronic music genres
- List of house music artists
- Styles of house music
- Music of the United States
