= Chicago house =

Music genre

- Stylistic origins: Hi-NRG; Italo disco; post-disco; electro; Industrial music
- Cultural origins: 1983, Chicago, U.S.
- Derivative forms: Detroit techno; techno; acid house; deep house

Fusion genres
- Hip house; ghetto house; italo house

Other topics
- House music; Garage house; LGBTQ music

Chicago house refers to house music produced during the mid to late 1980s within Chicago. The term is generally used to refer to the original house music of DJs and producers from the area, such as Ron Hardy and Phuture.

== History and origins ==
=== Disco edits ===
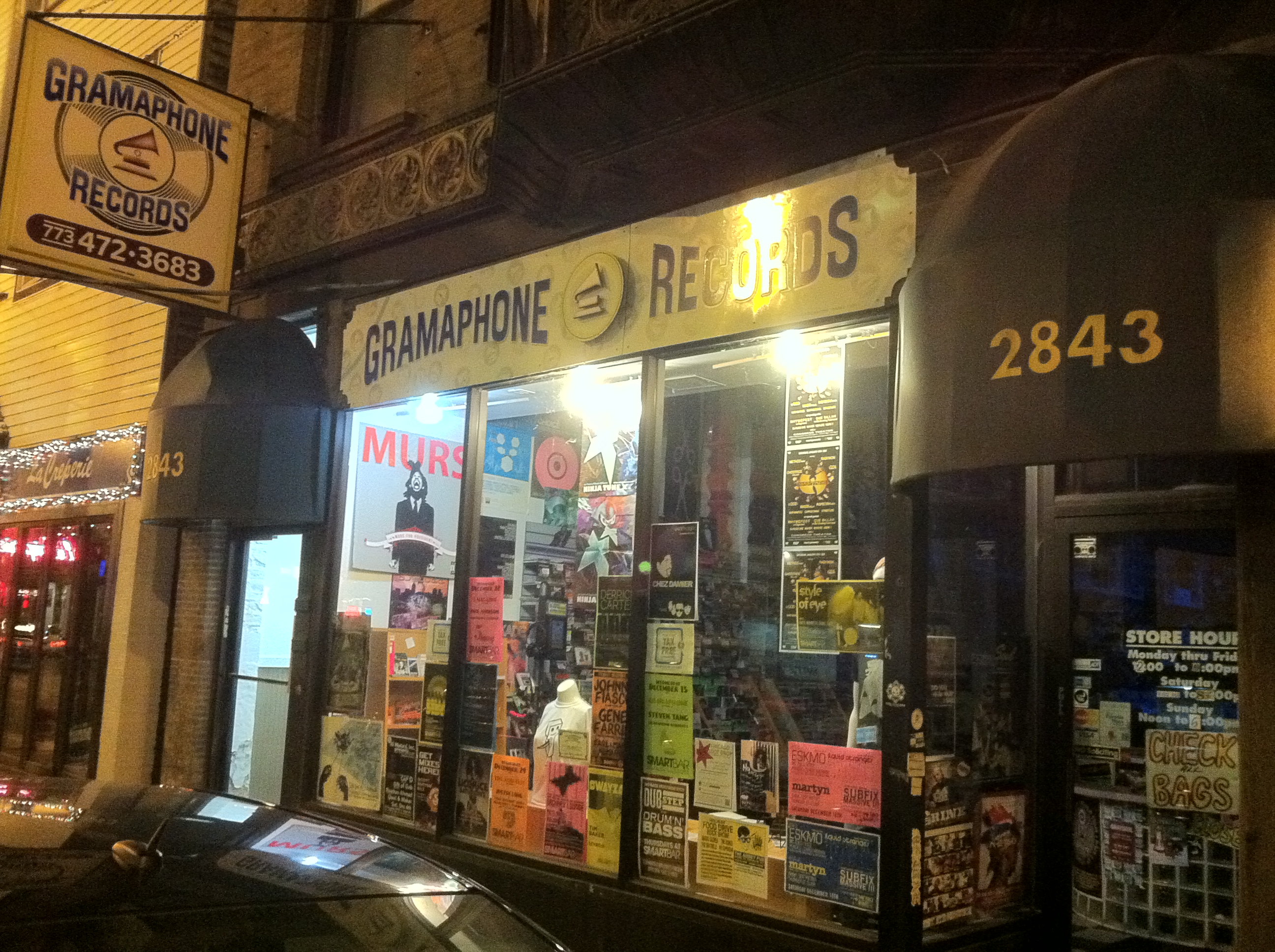
Gramaphone Records is known as the home of house records in Chicago.

Following Chicago's Disco Demolition Night in mid-1979, disco music's mainstream popularity fell into decline. In the early 1980s, fewer and fewer disco records were being released, but the genre remained popular in some Chicago nightclubs and on at least one radio station, WBMX-FM.

In this era, Chicago radio jocks The Hot Mix 5, and club DJs Ron Hardy and Frankie Knuckles played various styles of dance music, including older disco records, newer Italo disco, electro, EBM tracks, B-boy hip hop music by Man Parrish, Jellybean Benitez, Arthur Baker and John Robie as well as electronic pop music by Kraftwerk, Telex and Yellow Magic Orchestra.

Some of these DJs also made and played their own edits of their favorite songs on reel-to-reel tape, focusing on the portions of songs which worked well on the dancefloor. Some even mixed in effects, drum machines, and other rhythmic electronic instrumentation in an effort to give songs more appeal. These edits and remixes were rarely released to the public, and even then were available only on privately pressed vinyl records or on mixtapes.

=== European connection ===
The early house music sound was a "dialogue" between Hispanic, and Black American post-disco and European post-punk electronic music and their traditions with Italo-disco picked or, emulated the most, as the template for house music. Precursors include electro songs "Planet Rock", "Let the Music Play", Italo-disco (e.g. Klein + M.B.O.), on one hand; EBM (Liaisons Dangereuses; Deutsch Amerikanische Freundschaft on acid house) on another.

=== Original productions ===
What we did was gather all the right ingredients.

— Jesse Saunders

On the history, Farley "Jackmaster" Funk says "Jesse Saunders was first[.] He put out records before anyone conceived of doing it, got all the girls, and all the fame. Jesse wanted to be the next Motown." Screamin' Rachael, co-founder of Trax Records, describes the music the following way "[w]hat Trax did was really a combination of punk and industrial with a really great 4x4 dance beat. Today they want to call it EDM, but Chicago house is the mother of them all. A lot of people don’t want to recognize—I think people in the UK do, but others don’t. Part of it is that Chicago was never an industry town, and New York always likes to claim they did it first." In 1984, Saunders' label released, on 12-inch single, a song called "On and On". Saunders composed the track with Vince Lawrence to replace a record that had been stolen from Saunders' collection, the "On & On" bootleg disco megamix by Mach. That megamix, a pastiche of loops from several electronic disco records, particularly the bassline from Player One's "Space Invaders" (1979), had been Saunders' "signature" tune as a DJ; it was one that other DJs in the city did not play. Saunders and Lawrence added hypnotic lyrics and electronic instruments, utilizing a Roland TR-808 drum machine as electronic percussion as well as a Korg Poly-61 synthesizer and a Roland TB-303 bass synthesizer. In a 2010 interview, Saunders claimed the song sought to capture the essence of the style of disco that other local DJs were playing at the time, a style he says was already known locally as "house".

Saunders' success with the relatively unpolished "On & On" inspired other Chicago DJs to try their hand at producing and releasing original songs in a similar style, using electronic instrumentation. Early such recordings included Jamie Principle's and Frankie Knuckles' "Your Love" (1986); and Chip E.'s "Jack Trax" record (1985), featuring the songs "It's House" and "Time to Jack", each of which used complex rhythms, simple bassline, sampling technology, and sparse vocals. These producers were aided in their efforts by the availability of affordable, mass-produced electronic music instruments, especially those from the Japanese Roland Corporation, including the TR-909, TR-808 and TR-707 drum machines, TR-727 Latin percussion machine, Juno synthesizers, TB-303 bass module, and compact sequencers.

Although there are conflicting accounts of the term's etymology, by 1985, "house music" was synonymous with these homegrown dance music productions.

=== Increasing popularity and divergent styles ===
As with other dance music, DJs and local club-goers were the primary audience for this relatively noncommercial music, which was more conceptual and longer than the music usually played on commercial radio. Mainstream record stores often did not carry it, as the records were not available through the major record distributors. In Chicago, only record stores such as Importes Etc., State Street Records, JR's Music shop and Gramaphone Records were the primary suppliers of this music. Despite the music's limited commercial availability, house records sold in the tens of thousands, and the music was further popularized via radio station 102.7 WBMX-FM, where Program Director Lee Michaels gave airtime to the station's resident DJ team, the Hot Mix 5 (Ralphi Rosario, Mickey "Mixin" Oliver, Scott "Smokin" Silz, Kenny "Jammin" Jason, and Farley "Jackmaster" Funk). The Hot Mix 5 shows started with the station's launch in 1981, and was widely listened to by DJs and dance music fans in Chicago as well as visiting DJs and producers from Detroit.

Many of the songs that defined the Chicago house music sound were released primarily on vinyl by the labels DJ International Records and Trax Records, both of which had distribution outside of Chicago, leading to house's popularity in other cities, including New York and London.

Trends in house music soon became subgenres, such as the lush, slower-tempo deep house, and the stark, especially hypnotic acid house. Deep house's origins can be traced to Chicago producer Mr Fingers's jazzy, soulful recordings "Mystery of Love" (1985) and "Can You Feel It?" (1986), which, according to author Richie Unterberger, moved house music away from its "posthuman tendencies back towards the lush" soulful sound of early disco music.

Acid house arose from Chicago artists' experiments with the squelchy Roland TB-303 bass synthesizer, and the style's earliest release on vinyl is generally cited as Phuture's "Acid Tracks" (1987). Phuture, a group founded by Nathan "DJ Pierre" Jones, Earl "Spanky" Smith Jr., and Herbert "Herb J" Jackson, is credited with having been the first to use the TB-303 in the house music context. The group's 12-minute "Acid Tracks" was recorded to tape and was played by DJ Ron Hardy at the Music Box, where Hardy was resident DJ. Hardy once played it four times over the course of an evening until the crowd responded favorably. The track also utilized a Roland TR-707 drum machine.

Chicago house music was being licensed to UK Labels by DJ International, Trax, KMS and the Transmat record labels, and with that the music began to expand throughout Europe. Especially the "Jack Trax" compilations, starting in 1987, helped to make rare house records from the U.S. available cheaply in Europe.

Several house tracks became #1 hits on the UK Singles Chart, starting with Chicago musician Steve "Silk" Hurley's "Jack Your Body" (1987). The first house record considered to be a major hit overseas is "Love Can't Turn Around" by Farley "Jackmaster" Funk and Jesse Saunders featuring Darryl Pandy, which peaked at #10 in the UK Singles Chart in 1986.

== Relationship to Garage and Techno ==
At the same time as house was becoming big in Chicago, other related genres were forming in other major U.S. cities. Simon Reynolds' A Tale of Three Cities (the first chapter of his book Energy Flash) looked at the emergence of techno in Detroit, house in Chicago, and garage in New York City and the reasons why the cultures took off like they did. Detroit was a unique urban area where industrial jobs had placed blacks and whites in the same economic situations, and this led to the Europhilia of these black youths and popularity of techno music. It was an attempt "to distance themselves from the kids that were coming up in the projects, in the ghetto." (Reynolds, p. 5)

== Subculture ==
Chicago house aesthetic shared its look with other outsider hip hop and punk subcultures; however, the "indisputable sign of house-ness" came to be a "Ralph Lauren preppie meets English country gentleman style, with cardigans, woolen jodhpurs and riding boots."

=== The club scene ===
When these house clubs and parties started to appeal to a wider audience, it was similar to the past disco culture in New York City. Both genres originated catering to very specific subcultures and when the popularity grew it changed the whole scene. The posting of 'no jits' signs was "to make them feel unwanted. And that was when the scene started to self-destruct." However, even though there are definitely parallels between house and disco clubs, this seemed more like a reversal of roles. The more elitist house listeners did not want to dilute their clubs and culture. Pages 230–248 of Brewster & Broughton's Last Night a DJ Saved My Life also looked at the rise of the house scene in Chicago. Through showing Frankie Knuckles club, it gave a look at the club scene that was taking place and the energetic, sweaty, drug-fueled parties that house embodied. "House was a feeling, a rebellious musical taste, a way of declaring yourself in the know" (Broughton 242).

=== Dance styles ===
At least three styles of dancing are associated with house music: Jacking, Footwork, and Lofting. These styles include a variety of techniques and sub-styles, including skating, stomping, and shuffle steps (also see Melbourne Shuffle). House music dancing styles can include movements from many other forms of dance, such as and slamdancing, waacking, voguing, African, Latin, Brazilian (including Capoeira), jazz dance, Lindy Hop, tap dance, modern dance. House dancing is concerned with the sensuality of the body and setting oneself free in ecstasy—without the worry of outside barriers.

One of the primary elements in house dancing is "the jack" or "jacking"—a style created in the early days of Chicago house that left its trace in numerous record titles such as "Time to Jack" by Chip E. from the "Jack Trax" EP (1985), "Jack’n the House" (1985) by Farley "Jackmaster" Funk (1985) or "Jack Your Body" by Steve "Silk" Hurley (1986). It involves moving the torso forward and backward in a rippling motion matching to the beat of the music, as if a wave were passing through it. All footwork in house dancing is said to initiate from the way the jack moves the center of gravity through space.

== Influence and diaspora ==
An honorary street name sign in Chicago for house music and Frankie Knuckles

House, perhaps more than any other form of Black music, has birthed many offshoots and spread its sound far and wide. The prevalence of four on the floor beats in dance music is largely derived from house. It has influenced, in some capacity, garage house, jungle music, Eurodance, electropop, dubstep, and even certain elements of alternative rock and hip hop. More direct offshoots of house (e.g. acid house) are also notable for their own offshoots that extend the Chicago variant's family tree.

House also partakes in aspects of the musical traditions of other sounds. Most notable is the influence it takes from disco—genre progenitor Frankie Knuckles was himself a relocated New York Disco DJ. In many senses, house was a low-budget re-creation of disco, using synthesizers, sequencers, and samplers in the stead of orchestras and live performers. Disco also participated, to a less notable extent, in the soundsystem culture of typically Caribbean forms of dance music.

== See also ==
- Warehouse, Chicago
- Acid house
- Trax Records
- Club Zanzibar (black electronic-music venue in 1980s-era Newark, New Jersey)

General:

- Chicago record labels
