= Acid: Can You Jack? =

Compilation album by Various Artists
- Released: June 6, 2005
- Genre: Acid house
- Label: Soul Jazz
- Compiler: Stuart Baker

Acid: Can You Jack? is a 2005 compilation album released by Soul Jazz Records. The album compiles acid house music from the Chicago era from labels such as Trax and DJ International.

== Release ==
Acid: Can You Jack was released by Soul Jazz Records on June 6, 2005. The album was later re-released with a slightly altered track list and a digital download.

== Reception ==
Professional ratings
Review scores
Source	Rating
AllMusic	4.5/5 stars
Irish Times	4/5 stars
Pitchfork	(8.0/10)

From contemporary reviews, Daniel Siwek of XLR8R declared that the album "resembles a playlist from the Music Box, Ron Hardy's legendary club" declaring that "Phuture Jacks" and "I've Lost Control" were "just a few of the classics included" Justin Hopper of Pittsburgh City Paper commented that the album was a "highly listenable document" specifically praising the tracks by Phuture, Larry Heard and Marshall Jefferson. Hopper concluded that the album showed the genre "Leaving behind the million-dollar studio sound that house has become, this document is of a time when dance music's sensibility was raw, powerful, and purpose-driven" Jess Harvell of Pitchfork described the album as "is a strange mix of B-sides and lesser-known tracks with a few classics thrown in, but it still manages to hit most of the major acid tropes" and found that the genre "gets a little boring and samey in isolation and repetition" suggesting first-time listeners to try the Trax Records mix or Warp's Warp 10+1: Influences. Jim Carroll of the Irish Times gave the album four stars, noting that some tracks "are showing their age, but Soul Jazz's brilliantly compiled retrospective of acid's defining age highlight such flashbacks to relish as the subterranean stabs of Phuture's Acid Tracks, the hypnotic voodoo of Virgo Four's Take Me Higher and the dark, swirling pops of Tyree's Acid Over." Tom Leo of O Globo described the album as a collection of seminal songs that would trigger the acid house revolution in the United Kingdom.

== Tracklisting ==
Tracklisting adapted from the liner notes of the album.

Disc 1

No.	Title	Credited Performer	Length
1.	"This is Acid"	Maurice	4:52
2.	"Do You Want to Perculate?"	The Sweat Boyz (Adonis)	5:32
3.	"Go Wild Rhythm Track"	Virgo (Marshall Jefferson)	3:08
4.	"Beyond the Clouds"	Mr Fingers (Larry Heard)	7:56
5.	"Acid Crash"	Tyree	5:57
6.	"Phuture Crash"	Phuture (DJ Pierre / Spanky)	7:45
7.	"Dum Dum Part 2"	Fresh	7:06
8.	"Acid Bass"	Roy Davis Jnr.	4:53

Disc 2

No.	Title	Credited Performer	Length
1.	"I've Lost Control"	Sleezy D (Marshall Jefferson)	9:40
2.	"Take Me Higher"	Virgo Four	4:45
3.	"Box Energy"	DJ Pierre	5:12
4.	"Video Clash"	Lil' Louis	5:04
5.	"Acid Over"	Tyree	4:29
6.	"Explorer"	Green Velvet (Cajmere)	6:16
7.	"Like This"	Two of a Kind	4:23
8.	"Downfall"	Armando	4:47
9.	"Acid Tracks"	Phuture	12:20

== Credits ==
Credits adapted from the liner notes.

- Stuart Baker – compiler, interviewer
- Tim Lawrence – sleeve notes
- Angela Scott – licensing
- Adrian Self – sleeve design
- Qwaint Biskette – sleeve design
- Duncan Cowell – mastering
- Pete Reilly – mastering
- Pierce Smith – repro man
