= Virgo (album) =

Studio album by Virgo
- Released: 1989
- Studio: Rax Trax, Chicago, United States
- Genre: Chicago house
- Length: 36:56
- Label: Radical; Rush Hour (reissue)
- Producer: Eric Lewis; Merwyn Sanders

Virgo chronology
Virgo (1989)	Resurrection (2011)

Reissue cover
- Artwork for Rush Hour Recordings' 2010 reissue

Virgo is the debut studio album by American house music duo Virgo Four, released in 1989 on Radical Records in the United Kingdom. It compiles two 12" EPs released in the United States on Trax Records, Do You Know Who You Are? by Virgo Four and Ride by M.E.. Both were pseudonyms of Eric Lewis and Merwyn Sanders, two art students and childhood friends from Chicago. The album was first reissued in 2010 on Rush Hour Recordings.

While rooted in the Chicago house style, Virgo features a distinctive sound that is dreamier and more introspective than that of the duo's contemporaries, also incorporating elements of acid house and deep house. Although Lewis and Sanders made no effort to promote the album, its idiosyncratic music and the mystery surrounding the band's identity turned it into an underground cult classic over the years. Although it remains largely unknown, Virgo is now recognized as an essential release among house enthusiasts, and is considered by some as the greatest album of its genre.

== Background and production ==
Childhood friends Eric Lewis and Merwyn Sanders were born and raised in Chicago, United States. At first, they formed a band called Quadraphonics in middle school, with Lewis on guitar, Sanders on drums, DJ Calvin on bass, and "another friend named Edgwick" on guitar. In high school, only Lewis and Sanders stuck together, a time when they acquired a drum machine, a Moog synthesizer and other equipment used by the burgeoning Chicago house scene. They had discovered house music at high school parties (like Mendel Catholic High School) and nightclubs such as Ron Hardy's Muzic Box, the Power Plant and The Warehouse; the duo also frequented nightclubs in Toronto, Canada. Sanders recalls: "That was '80 or so, '81. We just started doing a bunch of music at home. At that time we got a 4-track. So, that's what we would do, go to school, and we would hang out and do music... and go shoot some ball, then work some more music."

Lewis and Sanders first approached Larry Sherman of Trax - a label that had a capital role in the development of house music - in 1984 or 1985, as the genre was beginning to take off. As titles in his catalogue were beginning to chart and the duo were unknown in the club scene, Sherman shrugged their demos off. State Street Records were also uninterested. At that time, the duo started attending the Art Institute of Chicago, and began to produce new music in its sound room. When they came back to Sherman in 1988 with additional material, he agreed to put it out. Sanders and Lewis produced the album at Rax Trax, where they met Rick Barnes (who ran the studio) and Derek Brand, members of the Nicholas Tremulis Band. Although Lidell Townsell was enlisted to help the duo with production, they ended up doing it themselves. Regarding the recording, Sanders stated: "Most of our stuff we played live except for the drum machine. Everything else we got so used to just playing, I guess just from the repetition, we didn't use a sequencer at all. We showed up at the studio, had our keyboards, hit "Record." It's kind of like a live session with the keyboards." They recorded all the songs in one live session, quickly moving on from track to track.

== Release and reception ==
When they approached Trax Records, Sanders and Lewis called themselves M.E., a reference to their initials, "with a possible nod to the Gary Numan tune of the same name as well." However, and despite Sanders' complaints, label head Larry Sherman insisted in releasing half of the material under the pseudonym Virgo Four as an effort to associate the duo with Virgo, a sort of supergroup consisting of Marshall Jefferson, Vince Lawrence, and Adonis. In 1989, the material was released as two 12" EPs in the United States - Do You Know Who You Are? by Virgo Four, and later Ride by M.E. The same year, the tracks were compiled and released as a CD album titled Virgo in the United Kingdom. It was licensed to Radical Records (also known as Radikal), the house offshoot of 80s urban label StreetSounds.

Neither Sherman nor Virgo made an effort to promote the album or contact other DJs. Reflecting on this, Gabriele of PopMatters felt that "it's testament to the emotional resonance of the music itself that it grew over the years into something of an underground classic. Sanders has said: "See Eric and I were so kinda, sometimes I actually kinda regret it, 'cause we were so detached from everything. [...] We were really just about the music. As soon as that was done, we were going back and still working on new stuff. We were looking at that as just a foot in the door to do something even bigger." As the Radical Records album was solely attributed to Virgo, confusion arose over the band's identity as it "gained traction over the ensuing years." Alexis Petridis stated that "no artist sums up the unknowability and mystique of the early house scene quite like Virgo."

More recently, tracks off the album have been featured on compilations from Warp and Soul Jazz Records. Virgo was remastered and re-released as a double 12" and CD in 2010 on Rush Hour Records, as part of their House of Trax reissue programme. This edition featured new artwork, "crisper highs and a slightly punchier low-end."

== Composition ==
"Do You Know Who You Are"
Originally released as "Do You Know Who You Are?" on Trax Records in 1989, and credited to Virgo Four.

A Chicago house album, Virgo's music draws elements from the local deep house and acid house styles, and bears influence and similitaries with the work of Larry Heard, Fingers Inc. and Armando. Parallels can be established between its "futuristic grooves" and other contemporary dance styles such as techno and Balearic beat. However, Virgo has been noted for its idiosyncratic sound, more introspective and dreamy than other mechanically intense styles from its era, Phuture's "Acid Trax" for example. In a 2009 interview, Merwyn Sanders stated: "We were into a lot of classic stuff, Kraftwerk and Gary Numan and a lot of jazz stuff. That’s what I grew up around, listening. My dad was a huge jazz fan, so that was just engrained in my head without me even knowing it. So I guess that’s what you get a little sense of with that album we did." Fact called it a "deep post-acid" album, and wrote that despite being similar to other contemporary house releases, "it stands alone, and its cerebral but generously groovy evocation of the urban nightscape has never been matched for elegance or acuity." Alexis Petridis of The Guardian described it as "music you might make the day after a drugged-out bacchanal – wistful and contemplative, shot through with a creeping, contagious melancholy." Joe Muggs described Virgo as "archetypal house music through and through: it is design as much as it is art, absolutely attuned to the proportions and metabolism of the human body in a technological society." He also noted that despite the "soulfulness and the spindly stripping down of its production", the album is not "less powerful than noisier, bassier or thicker music."

The first side of Virgo includes Virgo Four's Do You Know Who You Are? EP. Its opening track, "Do You Know Who You Are", features an "odd, nagging, guitar line" reminiscent of funk music. Following track "In a Vision" has been described as "strutting space-age bleep-house". Electro rhythms can be heard on "Take Me Higher", a track with "euphorically melancholic reggaematics". Richard Carnes of Resident Advisor felt that "Going Thru Life"'s "lolloping piano riff" showcases the duo's "visceral approach to music making." He also considered that the Ride material - included as the album's second side - "should really be looked upon as a different entity to the first half", as it features a "darker and more vocal-led direction to their first EP." He added that Ride "could easily slot into a set of contemporary techno." A "low-slung house" track, "School Hall" alludes to the high school parties were Lewis and Sanders were introduced to house music. "Never Want To Lose You" has been referred to as "jacking balladry". Closing track "All the Time" has been described as "a spirited attempt to introduce the sound of slap bass into the lexicon of house."

== Legacy ==
Despite not being a household name, Virgo is now recognized as an essential release among house enthusiasts and, according to Fact, it "is considered by many to be the greatest house record ever made." The publication listed Virgo as the second best album of the 1980s, with Joe Muggs writing: "It's a metaphor I've used before, but when you hear something as perfectly designed as this, it's like getting an amazing chair – one that is comfortable, beautiful, refined and usable every day. When you get something like that, regardless of its age, do you then abandon it or declare it obsolete or decide to attach a fifth leg to it just because your neighbours get a different chair made of some new construction material?"

Virgo was also included in The Guardian's 2007 list of the 1000 Albums to Hear Before You Die, which described it "as wistful and beautiful as house music ever got", as well as The Mojo Collection: The Ultimate Music Companion. In a retrospective review, Richard Carnes of Resident Advisor awarded the album four and a half out of five stars, calling Do You Know Who You Are? "the finest house music 12-inch ever created." He also considered "Take Me Higher" to be "one of the best electronic music tracks of all time." "In a Vision" was included in the 1999 compilation Warp 10+1: Influences, a compilation of music that influenced the founders and artists on Warp Records.

== Track listing ==
All tracks are written by Eric Lewis and Merwyn Sanders.

Side one
No.	Title	Length
1.	"Do You Know Who You Are"	4:45
2.	"In a Vision"	4:47
3.	"Going Thru Life"	4:37
4.	"Take Me Higher"	4:48

Side two
No.	Title	Length
5.	"Ride"	4:32
6.	"School Hall"	4:25
7.	"Never Want to Lose You"	4:43
8.	"All the Time"	4:19
Total length:		36:56

Notes

- "Do You Know Who You Are" listed as "Do You Know Who You Are?" (with question mark) on the label.
- "Never Want To Lose You" is misspelled "Never Want To Loose You" on the label.

== Personnel ==
Credits adapted from the liner notes of Virgo.

- Eric Lewis – producer
- Merwyn Sanders – producer
- Idest – artwork design
- Trax Records – phonographic copyright
- Sanlar Publishing – publisher
- Radical Records – marketing
- Spartan Records – distribution

== Release history ==
Region	Year	Format	Label	Artist	Title	N°
United States	1989	12" EP	Trax Records	Virgo Four	Do You Know Who You Are?	TX175
United States	1989	12" EP	Trax Records	M.E.	Ride	TX176
United Kingdom	1989	LP record	Radical Records	Virgo	Virgo	VIRGO1
United Kingdom	1989	CD	Radical Records	Virgo	Virgo	CDVIGO1
United Kingdom	1989	Cassette	Radical Records	Virgo	Virgo	ZCVIGO1
Germany	1989	LP record	Radical Records	Virgo	Virgo	VIRGO1
Netherlands	2010	2x12" record	Rush Hour Recordings	Virgo	Virgo	RH-TX1LP
Netherlands	2010	CD	Rush Hour Recordings	Virgo	Virgo	RH-TX1CD

== See also ==
- Frankie Knuckles
- Jamie Principle
- Detroit techno
- Rave music
