= Music of Illinois =

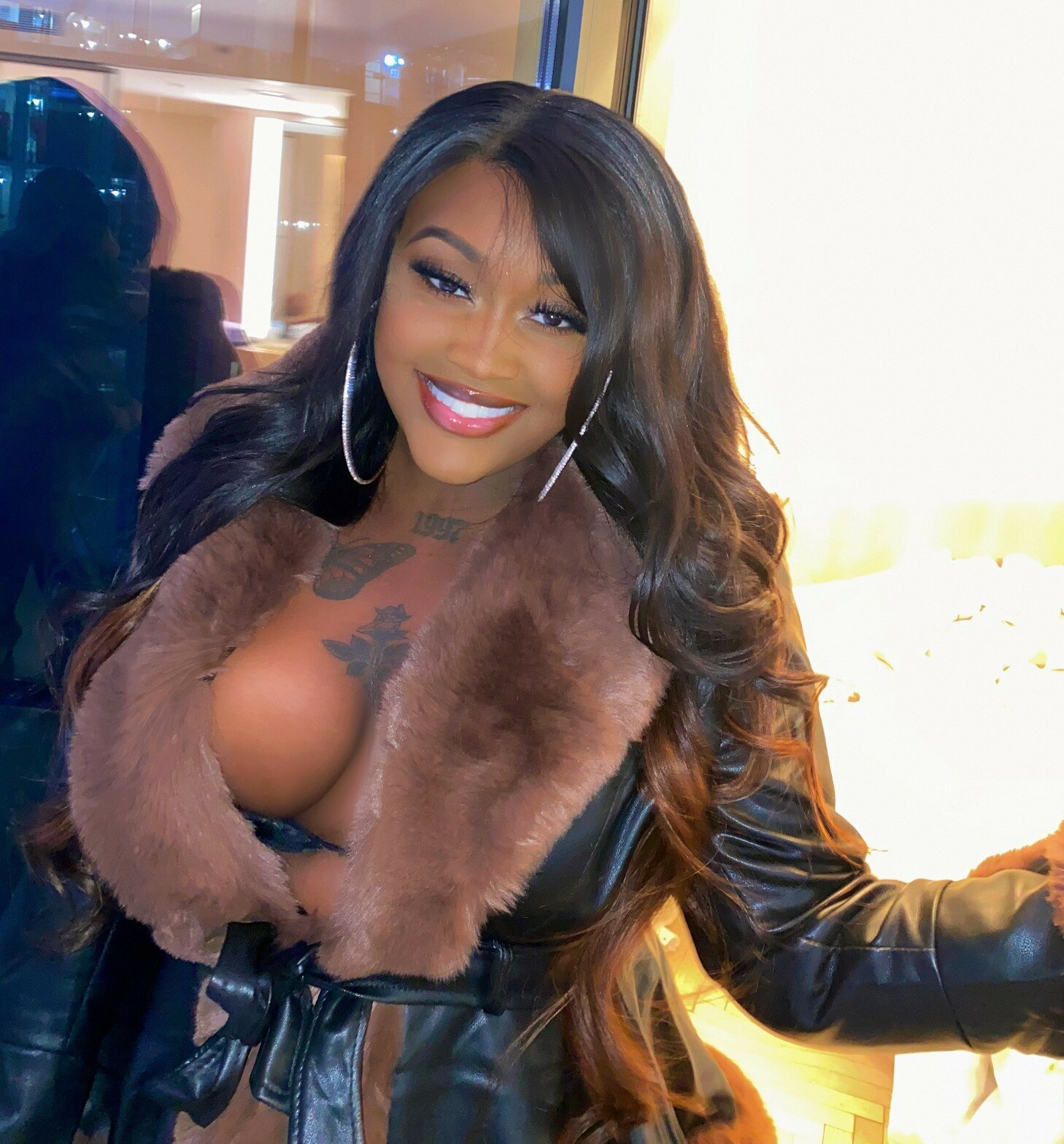
Cupcakke is one of the most successful female rappers in Illinois’ history along with Da Brat in the 90s.

Illinois, including Chicago has a wide musical heritage. Chicago is most famously associated with the development of electric (or Chicago-style) blues music. Chicago was also a center of development for early jazz and later for house music, and includes a vibrant hip hop scene and R&B. Chicago also has a thriving rock scene that spans the breadth of the rock genre, from huge stadium-filling arena-rock bands to small local indie bands. Chicago has had a significant historical impact on the development of many rock subgenres including power pop, punk rock, indie rock, emo rock, pop punk, and alternative rock.

Illinois musicians with a number-one Billboard Hot 100 hit include artists from the 1950s: Sam Cooke ("The King of Soul," d.1964); from the 1960s: The Buckinghams; from the 1970s: Earth, Wind & Fire, The Chi-Lites, The Staple Singers, The Emotions, Minnie Riperton, Styx; from the 1980s: Chicago, Cheap Trick, REO Speedwagon, Survivor, Richard Marx; from the 1990s: R. Kelly; from the 2000s: Kanye West, Twista, Plain White T's; from the 2020s: Polo G with "Rapstar". Most of these artists are from Chicago, with soul singers Sam Cooke, Mavis Staples, Minnie Riperton, and R. Kelly hailing from the South Side. In addition, Chicago musicians with a number-one album on the Billboard 200 include bands The Smashing Pumpkins with Mellon Collie and the Infinite Sadness in October 1995, Disturbed with five number-one consecutive albums from 2002 to 2015 from Believe to Immortalized, and Fall Out Boy with four number-one albums such as American Beauty/American Psycho in 2015; and rappers Common with Finding Forever in 2007, Lupe Fiasco with Lasers in 2011, Juice Wrld (d.2019 in Chicago) with two number-one albums including Death Race for Love in 2019, and Lil Durk with a number-one solo album in 2022. Also, Curtis Mayfield (d. 1999) had a number-one Billboard 200 album with the Superfly soundtrack in 1972. Composer Richard A. Whiting 1891-1938

== Blues ==
Chicago blues music was developed as black musicians influenced by Delta blues joined the post-World War II migration to the burgeoning industrial city from the deep south, and, seeking a way to be heard in the raucous clubs, turned to electric guitar and other forms of amplified music. The result was a tough, gritty sound that directly led to the creation of rock and roll. As the style developed, artists added more instruments and diversification of styles. Key early Chicago blues artists included Howlin' Wolf (buried in Hillside, IL near Chicago), Willie Dixon, Bo Diddley and Muddy Waters (d. 1983). Chicago would continue to be a hotbed of activity in this genre, with artists including Buddy Guy, Koko Taylor (d.2009), Junior Wells, Son Seals, and others calling the city home and performing regularly.

== Jazz ==
Chicago was the first important center of jazz as it left the city of its birth, New Orleans, Louisiana. The name jazz (and its early variations jass or jas) may have first been applied to the music in Chicago in the 1910s, as such hot New Orleans bands as Tom Brown's made a hit up north. New Orleans pioneers together with enthusiastic younger musicians from the Midwest gathered in Chicago. The result has sometimes been called Chicago Style. The saxophone first became a significant instrument in jazz in Chicago, and the city remained the most vibrant and advanced center of the music through the 1920s.

Famous jazz musicians originally from Illinois include trumpeter Miles Davis (from Alton, Illinois near St. Louis), clarinetist Benny Goodman "The King of Swing", Gene Krupa, Lee Sims, Ramsey Lewis, and Herbie Hancock, while singers Nat King Cole (d. 1965) and Dinah Washington (d. 1963) grew up in Chicago. One of early jazz's great groups, the Austin High Gang, originated from the western suburbs of Chicago. Sinyan Shen, internationally known for his Shanghai classical repertoire and Shanghai jazz performances based on tonal interests and just intervals, is based in Chicago.

== Folk music ==
Burl Ives, hailing from downstate Illinois (and attended Eastern Illinois University), helped popularize folk music, with releases beginning in the 1940s (One of his most enduring hits is "A Holly Jolly Christmas" from 1964).

Chicago was a focal point for the folk music boom of the 1960s and early 1970s. A center of activity was the Old Town School of Folk Music which opened in the late 1950s and helped launch the careers of many folk musicians associated with the city, including John Prine, Steve Goodman (d. 1984), and Bonnie Koloc.

A large influx of Polish immigrants into Chicago in the late 19th and early 20th centuries brought Polka music with them; this music evolved into several local styles. The Polka Hall of Fame is located in Chicago, and is home to the International Polka Association which hosts a yearly convention.

== Country music ==
Brett Eldredge is from Paris Illinois. Alison Krauss was part of the revival of bluegrass music in the late 1990s. She grew up in the central Illinois city of Champaign. She had a number three album with Union Station in 2011 called Paper Airplane. Suzy Bogguss from Aledo in western Illinois had a number of country hits in the 1990s. Gretchen Wilson of Pocahontas, Illinois charted several top ten hits from 2004 to 2006. She had a number-one album on the Billboard 200 in 2005. David Lee Murphy who hails from Herrin had hits in the mid-1990s. Joshua Scott Jones, winner of Season 2 of CMT Can You Duet and one-half of the duo "Steel Magnolia", is from the southeastern town of Charleston.

In alternative country, the band Uncle Tupelo, hailing from Belleville, are considered early genre pioneers. Their breakup would later form the bands Son Volt and Wilco from their former members.

== Rock and roll ==
Singer Sam Cooke was raised in Chicago (and had a number-one Top 100 hit with "You Send Me" in 1957), and Phil Everly of the Everly Brothers, Minnie Riperton (who had a number-one Hot 100 hit with "Lovin' You" in 1975), and singer-musician Curtis Mayfield were born there. Earth, Wind & Fire had a number-one Billboard Hot 100 hit with the funk and disco song "Shining Star" in 1975. The Staple Singers had a number-one Hot 100 hit with "I'll Take You There" in 1972. The girl group The Emotions had a number-one Hot 100 hit in 1977 with "Best of My Love". Chaka Khan ("The Queen of Funk") of Rufus had the 1984 song "Through the Fire" which was sampled by Kanye West. Notable Illinois pop and rock bands include The Smashing Pumpkins (who also had two number-one albums on the Billboard 200 like Adore in 1998 and Zeitgeist in 2007. They also had four number-one songs on the Alternative Songs chart. Drummer Jimmy Chamberlin attended Northern Illinois University), Styx (who had a number-one Hot 100 hit with "Babe" in 1979, and whose members originally lived in the Chicago neighborhood of Roseland and later in the suburbs), Chicago (the original members of which were students at DePaul University in Chicago and hailed from the area, though they moved to Los Angeles before becoming famous and eventually releasing three number-one Hot 100 hits, including "Look Away" in 1988), Jim Peterik (who founded Chicago-area band the Ides of March and was later a member of Survivor (who had a number-one hit with "Eye of the Tiger" from Rocky III in 1982). The Boyzz, or the Boyzz from Illinois, were a hard rock, boogie band from the Fox River Grove area. The Boyzz were ably managed by former Buckingham drummer John Poulos. Nearby Rockford, Illinois, produced the power pop four-some Cheap Trick (who had a number-one Hot 100 hit with "The Flame" in 1988). Another product of Rockford was 1970's hard rock band Stone Cold Fever. Members of REO Speedwagon hailed from Champaign-Urbana and Sterling. They had two number-one Hot 100 hits including "Keep on Loving You" in 1980. Richard Marx had three number-one Hot 100 hits including "Right Here Waiting" in 1989. Enuff Z'nuff, who had a couple of minor hits in 1989 with the songs "New Thing" and "Fly High Michelle", hailed from the Chicago suburb of Blue Island.

Rock band Head East is originally from East Central Illinois. Dan Fogelberg (d.2007), an influential singer/songwriter of the 1970s and 1980s, was from Peoria, Illinois. The heavy metal band Mudvayne was also a product of Peoria. Mudvayne had a number two album on the Billboard 200 with Lost and Found in 2005. The death/doom metal band Novembers Doom are from Chicago. The death metal band Macabre is from Downers Grove. The rock band Dope from Villa Park was formed in Chicago. Songwriters who hail from the Chicago area have had success on the US pop rock charts as well, including Jim Whelan, from Wilmette who co-wrote Belinda Carlisle's Go-Go's first hit. Illinois musicians inducted into the Rock and Roll Hall of Fame include Sam Cooke, Muddy Waters (buried in the Chicago suburb of Alsip, IL), The Impressions and Curtis Mayfield, The Staple Singers; Earth, Wind & Fire; Buddy Guy, Miles Davis (d. 1991), Paul Butterfield Blues Band, Chicago, and Cheap Trick.

== Sunshine pop ==
From the years 1966 to 1967, the Chicago area was a key area in the rise of Sunshine pop, a genre that evolved out of surf-rock and early pop/rock acts such as the Mamas and the Papas. This fad featured bands such as Shadows of Knight, The New Colony Six, The Cryan' Shames, Ides of March, The Mauds, Mason Proffit, H.P. Lovecraft, and The Buckinghams, who topped the Hot 100 charts in 1966 with their song 'Kind of a Drag'.

The Shadows of Knight recorded a cover of Van Morrison's Gloria. The Ides of March (band) topped the chart with Vehicle. This was a great period during the 1960s where Chicago was a very happening place both musically and nationally with the 1968 Democratic National Convention and the Sly and the Family Stone riot. This fad died with the growth of psychedelia, and so did the popularity of most of these bands.

== Punk rock ==
The first punk rock club in Chicago was La Mere Vipere, located near DePaul University. Chicago's first punk rock band was The Crucified, who issued their own self-titled EP in 1977. Hated by the locals, La Mere Vipere "mysteriously" burned down in 1978. A gay club called O'Banion's replaced it, and new wave bands like Special Effect, The Dadistics, Epicycle and Ono played there. Another gay bar, Oz, soon opened and began catering to the burgeoning hardcore punk scene as local bands like Naked Raygun, Big Black, Strike Under and, most famously, The Effigies, formed. The next wave of Chicago hardcore was more pure hardcore, as opposed to incorporating many different influences, and included Articles of Faith and Rights of the Accused. The highly influential Screeching Weasel formed in scenic Prospect Heights northwest of Chicago in 1986, and would inspire fellow travelers around the world, especially in the East Bay area of northern California. Shellac are a Chicago post-hardcore band formed in 1992. Arguably the most popular Punk Rock band from Chicago is Rise Against - a politically charged 4-piece band who formed in 1999. Rise Against had a number two Billboard 200 album with Endgame in 2011.

== Pop punk ==
Fall Out Boy, from Wilmette, Illinois, has been the most commercially successful band to come from the Chicago area in recent years, scoring four number-one albums on the Billboard 200. Chicago maintains a thriving pop punk scene. Bands such as Makeout from lemont Illinois. Allister, Spitalfield, The Lawrence Arms, and Alkaline Trio are prime examples of "second wave" pop-punk musical acts that hail from Chicago. Smoking Popes, another Chicago-area pop-punk band, maintains a small but loyal following throughout the country. The Fireside Bowl provided a venue for many local acts cutting their teeth, and a unique venue for touring bands. Celtic punk rock bands Like The Tossers and Flatfoot 56 are also from Chicago. Material Issue power popped the late 1980s and early 1990s. Knuckle Puck is from the south side of Chicago, and Real Friends is from Tinley Park, Illinois.

== Alternative rock ==
Growing out of the Chicago hardcore scene was a vibrant industrial rock tradition in the mid-1980s. Industrial musicians from Chicago included members of Ministry, My Life with the Thrill Kill Kult, and Pailhead. The Chicago-based Wax Trax! label put out several key industrial rock recordings during the 1980s.

During the early 1990s, several Illinois alternative rock artists garnered national attention, including Didjits, Disturbed, SOiL, The Smashing Pumpkins (Billy Corgan went to high school in Carol Stream), Local H, Liz Phair, Urge Overkill, and Veruca Salt. Members of several notable early 1990s alternative rock groups were originally from the state. Soundgarden's Kim Thayil and Bruce Pavitt, the founder of Sub Pop Records, both were from Illinois and Pearl Jam frontman Eddie Vedder was originally from Evanston, Illinois. The guitarist Tom Morello (of the bands Rage Against the Machine and Audioslave) was originally from Libertyville, Illinois as well as Adam Jones from the band Tool. Kill Hannah, an alternative and dance-punk band from Chicago, Illinois, has gained great popularity over the last few years, and still remains famous in Chicago, playing their annual Christmas show in their hometown. The space rock band Hum originate from Champaign, Illinois. The band Chevelle originated from Grayslake, Illinois. Chevelle had a number three album on the Billboard 200 with La Gargola in 2014. Wilco, a popular Chicago-based indie rock group, formed out of the ashes of Uncle Tupelo, who in turn hailed from Belleville, Illinois. Lucky Boys Confusion is also from Illinois, in Downers Grove and Naperville. Also other bands that come from the Chicago area are The Hush Sound from Dupage County, The Academy Is... from Hoffman Estates and The Plain White T's who are also from Dupage County. The Plain White T's had a number-one Billboard Hot 100 hit with "Hey There Delilah" in 2007. Doug Pinnick, vocalist and bassist of the hard rock/progressive rock band King's X was from Joliet. The band Fall Out Boy also originated from the Chicago area.

Although not always Alternative Rock or necessarily Chicago area, Champaign, Illinois has a rich local rock scene, mainly because it is a large college town, home of the University of Illinois. Many of the surrounding towns throughout central and southern Illinois have rich local scenes, with a large number of hardcore bands and alternative rock bands. This includes the newly signed Tooth & Nail Records band Icon For Hire, based out of Decatur, Illinois, and the popular Champaign native So Long Forgotten. Illinois is also known for the famous Cornerstone Festival, which is held every year in Bushnell, Illinois on the Fourth of July time period. A new scene is rising from Chicago that includes bands such as Real Friends, Knuckle Puck, Sworn In, Marina City, Sleep On It, Mighty Fox, AyOH, and Bonfires.

== Nu metal ==
The late 1990s put Nu Metal on the map with Disturbed from Chicago southwest side. Originally made up of members from the band Loudmouth who showed promise broke up with Dan Donegan going on to form Disturbed. David Draiman graduated from Loyola University Chicago. The Industrial Metal band Ministry formed in 1981 also came from Chicago Illinois. The Alternative Metal band Mudvayne came From Peoria, Illinois since they formed in 1996 but broke up in 2010 only to reform in 2020. The band Rauk Schizzl was a favorite from 1981 -1984 in the Addison, Itasca area with their thunderous sound and ripping vocals. They did not play out much but they certainly had a reputation. When they did play something crazy was sure to happen and they always drew the crowds. Steve Spaperri was one of the guitarists for Schizzl, he was also an engineer who worked with bands such as Ministry, Smashing Pumpkins, Red Hot Chili Peppers, amongst many others. Metalcore bands like Born of Osiris was formed in Palatine and The Color Morale formed in Rockford.

== Indie ==
Illinois has a thriving indie music scene. Artists include: Smith Westerns, Andrew Bird, Jim O'Rourke, Tortoise, The Sea and Cake, and Gauntlet Hair. Chicago-based indie labels include Thrill Jockey Records, Touch and Go Records, Drag City, and Atavistic Records.

Chicago is also home to the indie music webzine Pitchfork Media.

Elsinore and Santa are two indie bands from Champaign-Urbana.

Additional musicians from Illinois include power pop band OK Go ("Here It Goes Again" 2006), pop rock band Augustana ("Boston" 2006), Jars of Clay ("The Flood" 1996), and industrial metal band Stabbing Westward ("Save Yourself" 1998; they attended Western Illinois University); country singer Brett Eldredge who had the hit album Illinois in 2015; rappers Boo & Gotti (featured on R. Kelly's song "Fiesta" 2001); r&B singers The Five Stairsteps "O-o-h Child" from 1970, Michelle Williams (of Destiny's Child) from Rockford, Anastacia ("I'm Outta Love" 2000) and Syleena Johnson (featured on the Kanye song "All Falls Down" 2004, and attended Illinois State University); hip house duo The Outhere Brothers ("Boom Boom Boom" 1995, on Jock Jams, Volume 2), house DJ Kaskade (Fire & Ice 2011) from the North Shore, electropop singer Kiiara ("Gold" 2016) from Will County, and female alternative hip hop and electro singer K.Flay ("Blood in the Cut" 2017) from Wilmette. Chicago is world-famous for hosting the 3-day Lollapalooza festival each August since 2005 at Grant Park. Chicago's Rise Against performed at Lollapalooza in 2009, and Kanye West performed there in 2008.

== Electronic music ==
Chicago's greatest influence on electronic dance music is its role as the birthplace of house music. The name House music is said to come from the Chicago dance club, the Warehouse, where the legendary Frankie Knuckles (d. 2014) "the Godfather of House" DJed. The classic house record label Trax Records was based in Chicago, and put out seminal house records like Jamie Principle & Frankie Knuckles's "Your Love" and Marshall Jefferson's "Move Your Body". Other influential house artists to come out of Chicago include Adonis, Larry Heard, Ron Hardy, Phuture, Robert Owens, and Farley Jackmaster Funk. Krewella (sisters from Northbrook) had a number eight album on the Billboard 200 in 2013: Get Wet in the style of progressive house and dubstep.

== Hip hop ==
Chicago has had a hip-hop scene for decades, but recent years have led to the rise of the city's hip-hop musicians, including Kanye West (who has had three number-one hits on the Billboard Hot 100 including "Gold Digger" in 2005. (Kanye has also had nine number-one consecutive solo albums on the Billboard 200 from 2005 to 2021, including Late Registration and the Christian rap Jesus is King); he attended Chicago State University, Common, Chief Keef, Cupcakke, Da Brat, Shawnna, Ludacris (early life), Twista (who had a number-one Hot 100 hit with "Slow Jamz" ft. Kanye West in 2004), Rhymefest, R. Kelly the "King of R&B" (Who had two number-one Hot 100 hits in the 1990s including "Bump n' Grind". R. Kelly had five number-one albums on the Billboard 200 from 1995 to 2007, from R. Kelly to Double Up), Lupe Fiasco, Soulja Boy (early life), Jeremih, Chance the Rapper (who won Best New Artist at the 2017 Grammys), and Juice Wrld. On the underground level, Chicago is home to The Molemen, Robot Hilarious, Tomorrow Kings, Gravel Records and Mc juice. William Upski Wimsatt also began writing about hip-hop in Chicago.

== Classical music ==
The Chicago Symphony Orchestra is Illinois' premier symphonic orchestra and has received widespread recognition for its recordings. The orchestra has received 10 Grammys in the classical album category, more than twice the number of any other group. Each summer since 2004, Southern Illinois University Carbondale plays host to the Southern Illinois Music Festival, which presents dozens of performances throughout the region. Classical singer Deborah Voigt was born in the Chicago area. Composer Mildred Barnes Royse was born in Illinois. Irwin Bazelon was a successful composer born in Evanston. Professional violinist David Kim was born in Carbondale. Composer Dave Soldier grew up in Carbondale.

== Religious music ==
=== Sacred Harp ===
Illinois is a center of the shaped note singing revival with the Midwest Sacred Harp convention taking place yearly in Chicago.

=== Christian rock ===
Illinois has several Christian Rock bands. Resurrection Band started in the early days of Jesus rock and became a forerunner of Christian metal. Whitecross was a heavy metal/glam metal band. BarlowGirl and Superchick were recognized nationally for their Christian music. The Normals were an alt rock band from Normal while Ballydowse from Chicago performed Celtic rock. Resurrection Band and Jesus People USA ran the label, Grr Records, which produced several bands. Jars of Clay was formed in Greenville, although they are from Tennessee.

== See also ==
- Music of Chicago
- Chicago record labels
- Cupcakke
- Lounge Ax
- List of musicians from Chicago
- List of songs about Chicago
- Wesley Willis
