= The Night Writers =

House music group

- Also known as: The Knight Writers, The Nightwriters, Nightwriterz, The Night Riders
- Origin: Chicago, Illinois, United States
- Genres: Chicago House, Deep House, Disco, R&B, Soul
- Years active: 1987-1989
- Labels: Danica Records, Jack Trax, Ffrreedom, Danceteria Records, Phuture Trax Promotions, Mint Condition
- Past members: Jere McAllister, Riley Evans, Frankie Knuckles, Ricky Dillard

The Night Writers (also written as "The Nightwriters," "The Knight Writers," "Nightwriterz," and "The Night Riders") was a Chicago House group that was active from 1987 to 1989. Often considered an alias for Frankie Knuckles, who produced both of the group's landmark singles, the Night Writers' discography was also written by the lesser-known duo of Jere McAllister and Henry Riley Evans, with original vocals for "Let the Music Use You" performed by Ricky Dillard. "Let the Music Use You" was first released in 1987, with the subsequent release of "Over You" in 1989. Although the group dissolved following the release of "Over You," several individual members have released discography under variations of the same alias. McAllister briefly released music as The Knight Writers, while Evans used the alias Nitewriterz.

== Musical career ==
After its release in 1987, "Let the Music Use You" rose to widespread acclaim in both the United States and the United Kingdom. A second mash-up version of the single, "The Night Writers / BnC -- Let The Music (Use You) / House Ain't Givin Up" was released by Jack Trax later the same year. From 1987 to 2021, the track has been reissued, remastered, and remixed at least 14 times on labels such as Danica Records, Jack Trax, Ffrreedom, Danceteria Records, Phuture Trax Promotions, S12, and Mint Condition. In 1989 and 1990, Evans continued releasing records under the alias The Knight Writers, while In 1997, McAllister also briefly released music under the alias Nitewriterz. In 1989, the track was proceeded by its sonic sequel "Over You." Following the widespread acclaim of "Let the Music Use You," Ricky Dillard later created an the LP Let the Music Use You in 1989 under his personal name, with McAllister and Evans writing several of the tracks.

== Members and Contributors ==
=== Jere McAllister (Writer) ===
An underrecognized father of Chicago House, Jere McAllister (born Alan Walker) was a member of Steve "Silk" Hurley's ID Records and co-produced with Eric "E-Smoove" Miller. Michael Jackson, Janet Jackson, Dianna Ross, INXS, and Frankie Knuckles are a few of the Disco, House, R&B, and Soul artists he collaborated with. McAllister remains active in Chicago's music scene today, namely under the alias Mr. A.L.I. with Lavender Victor Bernard. An acronym for Afro-Latino Influence, Mr. A.L.I. brings authentic live mixing of Deep House back to the genre's home city for a new generation. Under the new alias, McAllister has released more recent works with Loveslap!, West End, and Unified Records.

=== Riley Evans (Writer) ===
Outside of his contributions under the alias of "The Night Writers," Riley Evans (born Henry Watson) remixed Mondee Oliver and Gallifre for Gherkin Records and co-wrote Lil Louis' hit track "Nyce & Slo". He is also known for producing and mixing the club vocal "Such As I have," printed in 1990 under Total Spectrum Records with featured artist TJ Slaughter. Born and raised on Chicago's South Side, he died from kidney and respiratory failure while visiting a friend in Maryland in 1991 at the age of 31.

=== Frankie Knuckles (Producer) ===
As the Godfather of Chicago House, Frankie Knuckles had many aliases throughout his lifetime. Although he produced both of the landmark singles for "The Night Writers," the immediately recognizable sound of Knuckles' signature production style has led many to mistakenly assume the tracks were created by him alone. However, McAllister, Evans, and Dillard all played pivotal roles in the co-creation of the group's discography.

A DJ and producer originally from New York, Knuckles was the resident DJ at the Warehouse in Chicago from 1977 to 1982 - the birthplace of House music and the origin of the genre's name. He later opened the Power Plant from 1983 to 1985. Throughout his career, Knuckles recorded with Trax Records, Danica, and eventually Virgin. He has worked with artists and producers such as FINGERS, INC, Marshall Jefferson, David Morales, Michael Jackson, Diana Ross, Chaka Khan, En Vogue, and Inner City.

=== Ricky Dillard (Vocalist) ===
Chicago native Ricky Dillard had musical influences in his teens both from the church and the club. Although he had initially wanted to break into Gospel, a primary influence in his start in Chicago's House scene was the Hot Mix 5, a DJ crew that played weekend mixes on local radio stations. At DJ International Records, he eventually met Godfather of House Frankie Knuckles, CEO Rocky Jones, and Farley "Jackmaster" Funk of Hot Mix 5, who began integrating Dillard's vocals on weekend radio hot mixes. His early connection to Frankie Knuckles led him to perform the vocals to the Night Writer's "Let the Music Use You" in 1987.

Under his own name, Dillard later released an LP also named Let the Music Use You in 1989, which included several tracks written by both McAllister and Evans. He subsequently retired from House to pivot back into Gospel, and has since been nominated for 6 Grammy Awards for Best Contemporary Soul Gospel Album (The Promise), Best Gospel Choir or Chorus Album (Unplugged... The Way Church Used to Be), Best Gospel Album (Amazing [Live]), Best Gospel Performance/Song ("Release [Live]"), and Best Gospel Album (Choirmaster). His most recent EP, Choirmaster: The Chicago House Remixes blends both genres as a testament to his early Chicago House roots as a teenager.

== Discography ==
=== Singles ===
Release year	Title	Format	Label	Country of release
1987	"Let the Music (Use You)"	12" 45 RPM	Danica Records	US
1987	"The Night Writers / BnC -- Let The Music (Use You) / House Ain't Givin Up"	12" 45 RPM	Jack Trax	US
1988	"Let the Music (Use You)"	12" 45 RPM	Jack Trax	UK
1988	"Let the Music (Use You)"	Stereo	Jack Trax	UK
1989	"Over You"	12" RPM (limited edition)	Jack Trax	US
1992	"Let the Music (Use You)"	12" 33 1/3 RPM	Danica Records	US
1992	"Let the Music (Use You)"	12" 45 RPM	Danica Records	US
1992	"Let the Music (Use You)"	12" 45 RPM, White Label	Danceteria Records, Phuture Trax Promotions	UK
2001	"Let the Music (Use You)"	12" 45 RPM	Danica Records	US
2004	"Let the Music (Use You)"	12" 45 RPM	S12	UK
2017	"Let the Music (Use You)"	12" 45 RPM, Reissue, Remastered	Mint Condition	UK
2021	Let the Music (Use You)	12" 45 RPM, Reissue, Remastered	Mint Condition	UK
