= Derrick Harris (musician) =

American musical producer (died 2019)

- Also known as: Sleezy D
- Born: Chicago, Illinois
- Died: June 13, 2019
- Genres: House, acid house, deep house
- Occupation: Music producer

Derrick Harris was a Chicago music producer and one of the pioneers of house music and acid house. He is known for the song "I've Lost Control", which was released as a 12" single on the Trax Records label, issue number TX 113. The song used a Roland TR-808 and a Roland TB-303 bass synthesizer to create the signature modulated waveform sound which would directly inspire acid house. The track is arguably the first to use this particular sound, and rose to cult underground popularity thanks to DJ Ron Hardy's Music Box club in Chicago.

Harris died on 13 June 2019, from kidney failure. Close friend and production partner on "I've Lost Control", Marshall Jefferson, paid tribute to Harris, who he called a "true pioneer". "Derrick was the life of every single party he went to," writes Jefferson, "dancing from the first song to the last every time. Anyone anywhere that calls themselves a raver has this man to thank for it." "He checked himself into the hospital and two days later was dead... just like that", Jefferson reflected afterwards. Harris is survived by his three sons. A crowd funding campaign was launched on GoFundMe by his family, to cover the funeral expense and hospital bills.

== Sleezy D ==
Derrick Harris took on the nickname 'Sleezy D' from his peers in adolescence, and preferred friends to call him by that name until his death. Close friend Marshall Jefferson told The Quietus in 2013: "If you ever met him, you’d never forget him. Oh man, he is… sleazy."

After Jesse Saunders released “On and On” in 1984, a Guitar Center salesperson talked Jefferson into buying thousands of dollars' worth of production gear. Jefferson and Harris experimented with the equipment, with Marshall secretly passing demo cassettes to a local club DJ, Ron Hardy at The Music Box, under the production credit pseudonym of Virgo. However, when Jefferson's work shift patterns changed, he was unable to take down the cassettes himself, so Harris took them to the club instead. Harris started claiming that he had made the recordings. “I couldn’t go to the Music Box as much as I wanted because [the club] was midnight to noon, and I was working midnight to 8:30,” Marshall Jefferson explains. “[When I] got down to the Music Box, all of the security guards [said to Harris], ‘Hey Sleezy, hey Sleezy, all right Sleezy!’. So I try to walk in with Sleezy. Thump!” – Jefferson slaps his chest – “‘Who the [heck] are you??’ They thought Sleezy was the one making all of the music!” Jefferson and Harris collaborated on several further productions, and Jefferson was often asked during his career if he was, in fact, Sleezy D.

== "I've Lost Control" (12" single) ==
Derrick Harris wrote about making this recording in a 2015 interview about Ron Hardy. “I’ll never forget: I came back from the Power Plant [club] one morning, at about ten or eleven o’clock – and I called Marshall,” said Sleezy. “I was like, ‘I’m feeling it, man, let’s lay down a track.’” Marshall Jefferson said “That song, it was just an 808 and a TB-303,” he recalled. “Sleezy got it right away. I wanted to basically put a nervous breakdown on vinyl.” Harris continues “I’m not going to say I was high as hell, but believe me, ‘I’ve Lost Control’ was inspired by the night I had,” he laughed.

The track was completed in 1984, but not published on vinyl until 1986, becoming Trax Records 13th released single. Marshall says “When Derrick made “I’ve Lost Control” in 1984, there was absolutely nothing like it anywhere. A completely new sound that inspired clubbers all over the world, peaking with the “Summer Of Love”. The song however largely remained underground. Harris did not produce any further records, although co-produced several, including the 2016 single 'Marshall Jefferson & Full Intention Present Sleezy D - Do You Believe'.

== Godfather of acid house ==
It is debated whether the first 'release' of a sound or the first 'use' of a sound constitutes 'first' status. While the 808 and 303 had been used before in other songs, "I've Lost Control" was arguably the first song to include a particular modulated waveform sound, which went on to be used extensively in the acid house musical genre. This includes the Phuture song "Acid Trax", which was written in 1985, but published in 1986, and was the first song to commercially popularise this sound. Marshall Jefferson suggested for Channel 4 that although Harris may have discovered the original sound, DJ Pierre of Phuture probably deserves the mantle of Godfather of Acid. "There has been 5,000 Acid House records after Acid Trax and nobody did it like Pierre. Pierre did it in a musical way; to follow the mood of the song; everybody else just turned knobs; maan its never been done like that."
