= Move Your Body (Marshall Jefferson song) =

Single by Marshall Jefferson
- Released: June 1986
- Genre: Chicago house
- Length: 7:38
- Label: Trax
- Songwriter: Virgo
- Producer: Virgo

"Move Your Body" is a 1986 house music song by American musician Marshall Jefferson. The track was released by Trax Records label, following several earlier tracks under aliases such as Virgo. After several popular tunes given to Chicago-based DJ Ron Trent, Jefferson released his first track "Go Wild Rhythm Tracks" on Trax Records and later became an A&R in 1986. Despite negative reception from his co-workers and Trax owner Larry Sherman, Jefferson's track "Move Your Body" became popular with patrons of Chicago dance music clubs in 1985 from cassette tapes, leading to the track's eventual release in June 1986.

"Move Your Body" opens with a piano chord and is among the earliest house music tracks to feature piano. The music recorded for the song was originally played much slower during the recording process and sped up by Jefferson for its final release. Outside Jefferson's involvement, the song features an uncredited vocal performance from his friend Curtis McClain that feature lyrics revolving ones enthusiasm and losing themselves in house music.

== Background ==
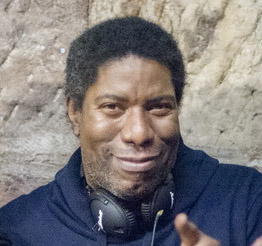
Marshall Jefferson in 2013. Jefferson produced and composed the song under his alias of "Virgo".

In 1985, Marshall Jefferson worked at a post office and went to a music store with his friend who was a guitarist. Jefferson was a fan of rock music, specifically noting bands such as Black Sabbath, Led Zeppelin and Deep Purple, stating he "bought the records with every penny [he had]," as well as attending the Music Box club in Chicago. At the store, a salesperson came up to him and showed him the Yamaha 284 synthesizer telling him it could play it like a professional keyboard player even if you never had lessons. Jefferson received a line of credit from his work and not only bought the sequencer along with a keyboard, drum machine and a mixer which totalled up to around $9,000. Jefferson took the equipment home and wrote his first song two days later. This equipment would also be used for making "Move Your Body".

Jefferson described the music as he played as being dance music that he felt would "sound right at the Music Box" despite not being able to attend due to working late hours at the post office. Derrick Harris, a friend of Jefferson's known as Sleezy visited him and asked for a cassette copy of the song Jefferson had created. Sleezy took Jefferson's music to the Music Box club where the DJ Ron Hardy would play, which led to Sleezy returning to Jefferson stating how popular his music had gotten at the club. This led to Jefferson completing more tracks leading to Jefferson proclaiming he had "like 15 songs playing in the Music Box". Lawrence eventually connected with Ron Hardy and continued to give him cassettes of his work, including tracks stated in an interview in 2005 that "were never put out."

Jefferson began developing records after looking at Jesse Saunders record and went to the address on the Trax Records and Precision Records labels. On meeting with Larry Sherman of Trax, he helped release Jefferson's first record of "Go Wild Rhythm Tracks" as Virgo. Jefferson spoke negatively about his work with Sherman, stating "it just fucked my head all the way up!" and later declared that Sherman "was like heading everybody off and stuff and trying to fuck them up, and make them quit the music business because he knew it was easy to make the music!" Jefferson explained that Sherman was predominantly keeping a low profile and worked with smaller labels distributors as he did not want a lot of attention brought to him as he was running a "chop shop" above Trax Records, a place where stolen cars were torn apart and had spare parts sold from them which was where Sherman larger profits came from. By 1986, Jefferson was the head of A&R for Trax Records.

=== Production ===
For "Move Your Body", Jefferson stated he wanted to have something on the track that would "drive the rack forward" and felt that a piano would do this. The song was developed with minor chords which Jefferson found easier to perform. Jefferson called two of his friends who were co-workers at the post office, Thomas Carr and Rudy Forbes, who went into the studio with him to make the record which Jefferson estimated had travel time, recording and mixing took about five or six hours. To play the piano intro, Jefferson recalled that he recorded the keyboards at about forty to forty-five beats per minute then sped it up. Jefferson did this for other tracks as well, such as playing the bassline at 40 beats per minute and then speeding it up to 122 beats per minute. To make it sound natural and not mechanically sped up, Jefferson linked the notes up and know how much I was going to lengthen each one by to be able to fit them together, which Jefferson commented that he "learned how to do that on the fly, too, because I had to." The vocals on "Move Your Body" were performed by Jefferson's friend Curtis McClain.

Jefferson was very enthusiastic about the track but his friends told him it was awful and it needed to be fixed, a reaction that surprised Jefferson. Jefferson received similar reactions to the track from his friends Mike Dunn, Tyree Cooper and Hugo Hutchinson who merely said that the track was OK. In August 1985, Jefferson took the track to Ron Hardy who was very enthusiastic about it and when Jefferson attended the Music Box it was played six times in a row to an enthusiastic crowd.

== Music ==
In his book Inner Sound: Altered States of Consciousness in Electronic Music and Audio-visual Media, Jonathan Weinel described the track as a Chicago house track began with piano chords over a 4/4 time signature. The track contains vocals declaring "Gimmie that house music to set me free / Lost in house music is where I wanna be" with a refrain of "Move Your Body / Rock Your Body". Weinel noted that the lyrics celebrate the "ecstatic revelry and physicality of losing oneself in dance" while critic Simon Reynolds reflected that "the social scene of Chicago house was one in which gay black men were able to find liberating communal experience of dance in response to their status as exiles from mainstream culture." Weinel reflected on this noting that these themes extended to other Chicago house tracks such as Joe Smooth's "Promised Land" and Fingers Inc.'s "Can You Feel It".

== Release ==
Despite having pressed the track early, "Move Your Body" was not released initially by Trax, with Jefferson recollecting that Sherman didn’t like it, proclaiming the song wasn’t house music. This response led to Jefferson adding the phrase "The House Music Anthem" to the title of the track. British journalists came to Chicago to report on the house music phenomenon which led to Sherman taking them to about five clubs with each DJ playing "Move Your Body" to a positive reaction which led to the track being released by Trax. It was released by Trax in June 1986 with Jefferson commenting that "It probably never would have come out but it had gotten so big in all the clubs in Chicago."

The label for the record listed Marshall Jefferson as the artist on the record opposed to his alias of Virgo as the creator which Jefferson reflecting that it "basically screwed up my Virgo nickname for the rest of my life because it was my biggest hit and I had to use Marshall Jefferson from then on. And it was a shame because I used to love that Virgo nickname. Everywhere I went people would be like “Virgo! Virgo! Virgo!” to me. But in one fell swoop, he wiped out my nickname. [laughs] Man! I really wish I’d had a nickname!" The track would be released under various alterations of the title, such as its subsequent releases on DJ International Records such as "Move Your Body — House Music Anthem". This version was a longer track, with Jefferson feeling that he “stupidly thought I could do a better version in a big studio". In 2005, Jefferson stated he received no publishing cheques from any of his songs including "Move Your Body", despite having paid the money to have "Move Your Body" pressed to vinyl. The rights to the track were eventually owned by Jefferson himself in 2012.

In 2019, Jefferson released a remix of the track with Manchester duo Solardo. The remix was certified gold by the British Phonographic Industry (BPI) in 2026.

== Reception and legacy ==
From contemporary reviews, Michael Freedberg of The Boston Phoenix referred to the song as among the three best house music songs, along with J.M. Silk's "I Can't Turn Around" and Jungle Wonz's "The Jungle". In the same newspaper, Jimmy Guterman gave the single a four star rating, calling Jefferson house music's "best lyricist" while acknowledging that the songs similarity to The Strikers song "Body Music". Guterman declared Jefferson's version to be an update with a ""Go to work!" howl with an exclamation point."

In DJ Mag's 100th issue in October 1993, the track was listed on their top five tracks by DJ Pierre and Kevin Saunderson. DJ Pierre would list the song as being among his choice of "classic cuts" in 1995, saying, "This is the ultimate party song, the most powerful I've ever heard. You and your friends will want to jump up and down and sing all the words. It's got the most dominant house piano chord progression in house today; everybody has stolen those chords. That chord progression is essential in house/garage music."

In 2011, The Guardian featured it in their "A History of Modern Music: Dance". In 2014, Rolling Stone magazine included it in their "20 Best Chicago House Records" list, adding, "This track's claim to fame is the first use of piano on a house record — and its barnstormer melody on the keys would be imitated for decades. Jefferson culled the song's vocalists — including lead crooner Curtis McClain — from his post-office graveyard shift. And, with his lyrics, he helped foment the long trend of the self-referential track: house music about house music itself."

In 2015, LA Weekly ranked it number 10 in their list of "The 20 Best Dance Music Tracks in History". In 2020, NME ranked it among "The 20 Best House Music Songs... Ever!". In 2021 and 2022, Rolling Stone ranked "Move Your Body" numbers 335 and eight in their lists of "The 500 Greatest Songs of All Time" and "200 Greatest Dance Songs of All Time" respectively. In 2024, DJ Mag featured it in their "40 Essential Tracks from 40 Years of House Music". Jefferson himself commented, "The house music anthem. They're still playing it, and every time it gets played, the hands are still in the air — 38 years!" In 2025, Billboard magazine ranked it number 58 and number one in their lists of "The 100 Best Dance Songs of All Time" and "The 50 Best House Songs of All Time".

== In popular culture ==
The song was featured in the 2004 video game Grand Theft Auto: San Andreas on the in-game house music station SF-UR.

== Track listing ==
- 12" single (TX117)
1. "Move Your Body" – 7:38
2. "Dub Your Body" – 7:30
3. "Drum Your Body" – 5:40
4. "House Your Body" – 7:38

== Credits ==
Credits adapted from the singles label sticker.

- Marshall Jefferson (as Virgo) – producer, arrangements, composer
- Ron Hardy – mixing
