= Phuture 303 =

Phuture 303 was an acid house music group founded in 1996 by DJ Spank Spank. Its members included Roy Davis Jr., Damon Neloms (a.k.a. Professor Trax), L.A. Williams, Ron Maney a.k.a. DJ Skull and Rio "The Musician" Lee.

Phuture 303 released several singles and two full-length albums "Alpha & Omega" in 1996 and "Survival's Our Mission" in 2001.

In 2014, Pierre and Smith reunited as PHUTURE with Lee.,

== Members ==
- Spanky, a.k.a. DJ Spank-Spank, (Earl Smith Jr.)
- DJ Skull (Ron Maney)
- Roy Davis Jr.
- L.A. Williams
- Lothario "Rio" Lee* Roy Davis Jr.
- Damon Neloms a.k.a. Professor Trax

== Discography ==
=== Singles and maxi-singles ===
- Acid Soul (1997)
- Phreedom! (1997)
- Hardfloor Will Survive (Hardfloor vs. Phuture 303) (1998)
- Thunder Part One (2000)
- Thunder Part Two (2000)
- Soulgers Of Tekkno (2000)

=== Albums ===
- Alpha & Omega (1996)
- Survival's Our Mission (2001)

=== Remixes ===
- DJ Pierre: Matrix Chamber (Phuture 303 Deep Underground Mix) (1999)
- Zzino vs. Filterheadz: No Weapons (Phuture 303 Remix) (2002)
