= DJ International Records =

Chicago record label

D.J. International Records
- Parent company: Universal Music Group
- Founded: 1985
- Founder: Rocky Jones / Benji Espinoza
- Status: active
- Distributor: UMC/UMe
- Genre: House music
- Country of origin: United States
- Location: Chicago, Illinois
- Official website: https://www.udiscovermusic.com/genre/dj-international/

D.J. International Records is a Chicago record label founded in 1985 that specializes in house music, a type of electronic dance music. In the 1980s, DJ International Records released music by key house innovators such as Frankie Knuckles, Ron Hardy (his 1986 remix of the It’s track “Donnie”), Hot Mix 5 member Farley "Jackmaster" Funk (his 1986 track "Love Can't Turn Around"), Steve “Silk” Hurley (his 1985 "Music Is The Key"), and Marshall Jefferson (his 1986 song "Move Your Body"). DJ International Records also released ESP’s song "It's You", Dymond's "Wild About Your Love", and Liz Torres' "What You Make Me Feel". The label also released acid house, such as Adonis's 1987 "The Poke" and Tyree's "Acid Over", as well as late 1980s hip house recordings, such as Fast Eddie's "Hip House" and "Yo Yo Get Funky". In the early 1990s, the label released Mike Dunn's song "Jass Yo Azz Off". Udiscover Music called the "history of DJ International...the history of house music, the very DNA of modern dance music."

In 2019, many of the label's master recordings were bought by Universal Music.

In August 2020, DJ International debuted a Frankie Knuckles track "Carefree (I Am A Star)" posthumously as the first release from the forthcoming Jackmaster 7 album, a follow-up to the six Jackmaster albums the label put out between 1987 and 1991.
