= Earl Smith Jr. =

American musician

Earl Smith Jr. (c.1965 – September 21, 2016), known as DJ Spank Spank or Spanky, was an American musician credited with inspiring the acid house music genre. He founded the group Phuture.

== Biography ==
He became involved in music production after dancing to house music played in Chicago by DJ Ron Hardy. In 1985 he formed Phuture with DJ Pierre and Herbert Jackson, and bought an old Roland TB-303 synthesizer which enabled him to create an "unusual burbling, squelchy" bass line. Smith said: "I knew that we needed something else than just beats. So we would try to make music together with keyboards and stuff like that, but it really didn't sound where we was confident that Ron Hardy would play it. It wasn't until we purchased the TB-303 that [we thought] this would be something that Ron Hardy would play in the club, which was 'Acid Tracks.'" After being circulated on cassettes, "Acid Tracks" was released by Trax Records in March 1987, and is sometimes claimed as the first acid house record. Smith remained with Phuture for further releases, before the group split up around 1990. As Spanky, he then issued tracks on various labels before Phuture reformed in 1996.

Smith died in September 2016, aged 51, after suffering a stroke earlier that year, leaving behind an unfinished album.
