= Derrick Harris =

Derrick Harris may refer to:

- Derrick Harris (American football), American football player
- Derrick Harris (musician), Chicago music producer of house music and acid house
- Derrick Harris, better known by his stage name True Master, American hip-hop record producer and rapper

== See also ==
- Derek Harris (disambiguation)
