= Acid Tracks =

Single by Phuture
- B-side: "Phuture Jacks", "Your Only Friend"
- Released: 1987
- Genre: Acid house
- Length: 12:15
- Label: Trax
- Songwriters: Herbert J; DJ Pierre; Earl "Spanky" Smith Jr.
- Producer: Marshall Jefferson

Phuture singles chronology
"Acid Tracks" (1987)	"We Are Phuture" (1988)

"Acid Tracks" is a 1987 acid house song by Phuture produced by Marshall Jefferson and released by Trax Records. Phuture consisted of Nathan Pierre Jones, better known as DJ Pierre, Earl Smith Jr (known as "Spanky"), and Herbert Jackson. Jones had been interested in developing dance music and became superficially interested in house music after Spanky had taken him to see DJ Ron Hardy perform in Chicago. The trio began developing tracks without finding anything that they felt was satisfying; Jones had heard a track made on the unpopular Roland TB-303 bass machine, which led the group to purchase one.

In 1985, the group developed a track initially known as "In Your Mind", which they gave to Ron Hardy to listen to. Hardy agreed to play it at the Muzic Box. Although the audience were not at first receptive, the song became more popular over the course of the night. "Acid Tracks" was bootlegged as "Ron Hardy's Acid Track", leading to Phuture seeking out a way to release it on vinyl. The group connected with Marshall Jefferson, then working for Trax Records, who released the popular house music song "Move Your Body". Jefferson assisted with the recording by slowing down the beats per minute and suggesting a vocal change on the B-side "Your Only Friend".

Following its release in 1987, its popularity expanded outside Chicago and it became a foundational acid house track in the United Kingdom.

== Development ==
=== Background ===
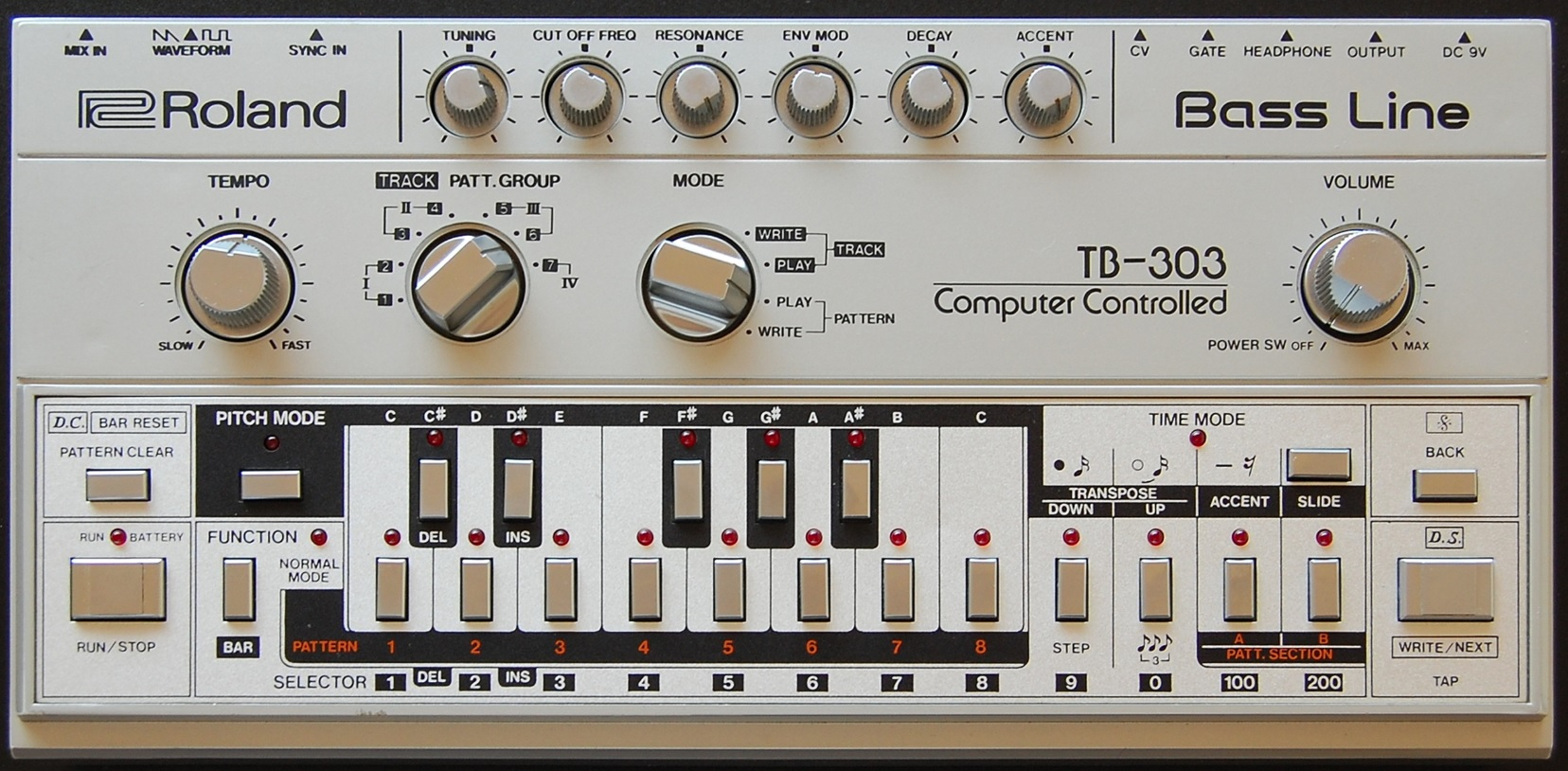
"Acid Tracks" was developed through experimentation on the Roland TB-303

Nathan Pierre Jones, better known as DJ Pierre, grew up in a musical family in Chicago suburb of University Park. He played drums and clarinet in school bands before getting into DJing and scratch mixing. Pierre became interested in music through listening to the Hot Mix 5 radio show, in particular the episodes hosted by Farley "Jackmaster" Funk. Jones was predominantly making break-dancing music, but changed styles after Spanky took him to a club called the Muzic Box, where DJ Ron Hardy performed. Jones described it as being "baptized into real house music by going there, I'd never seen anyone yell for a DJ before Ron Hardy. I mean, they were screaming his name. People were so passionate that they would start crying."

As Phuture, Jones, Earl Smith Jr. (known as "Spanky"), and Herbert Jackson began to experiment, but were not satisfied with any of the basslines they developed. Jones heard a friend's track; inspired by his bassline he created, he discovered that it had been developed using a Roland TB-303, a bass synth designed to provide an automatic bass accompaniment for solo guitarists. Jones recalled that Spanky had found the TB-303 at a second-hand shop for about $40, while Spanky recollected that he his initial search for the machine had no result until he found it second-hand for $200, which he "[spent his] last dime on". Following the purchase of the equipment, the group began experimenting on their first tracks.

=== Production ===
Herb and Spanky worked on the track from late 1985, using the 303 to create a "bleeping" noise which then led to Jones to start "turning the knobs up and tweaking it just like [Herb and Spanky] were". Spanky recollected that the group was pressing a button that was supposed to sound like a live bass guitar, but the imitation was poor and afterwards "began pushing buttons [he] didn't understand". Encouraged by his bandmates, Jones kept experimenting with the sound. When experimenting with the machine, Jones recalled that he "wanted to make something that sounded like things I'd hear in the Music Box, or I heard Farley play on the radio" and that "when we made 'Acid Tracks', that was an accident. It was just ignorance, basically. Not knowing how to work the damn 303."

The group sought a sound which Chicago DJs might use as an opening track. They took a cassette tape of the recording to the Muzic Box for Ron Hardy to play. They waited outside the club for two hours before giving it to him, believing that "he was the man. If he said he loved something, that was it. But if Ron Hardy had said he didn't like it, that would have been the end of acid." According to Jones, Hardy listened to the entire 30 minutes without saying anything. Jones recalled that they "were worried, because he didn't give us any indication that he liked it... and so we were just quiet. When it faded out he looked over at us and said, 'When can I get a copy?'"

Jones recalled that when "Acid Tracks" was first played by Hardy, everyone left the dance floor, leaving them to think he would never play the song again. He later played the song a number of times that night, getting a better reception each time; by the fourth performance around 4am, the crowd were "ecstatic". Jones recalled that "People were dancing upside down. This guy was on his back, kicking his legs in the air. It was like, 'wow!'" When originally conceived, the track was titled "In Your Mind". The track became a regular feature in Hardy's DJ sets, with fans resorting to bootlegging it on microcassette recorders. These fans began calling the track "Ron Hardy's Acid Track", leading to the track's title change. On the new title, Jones recollected that he was "very innocent" and was unfamiliar with the drug lysergic acid diethylamide, colloquially known as "acid", recalling that "sometimes things will go right over my head. I was like, acid makes a gritty sound. Like you know, you have battery acid, you'd always see the sign 'acid' and then they show somebody pouring something out of a tube onto metal and be melting it. And I thought, okay, this thing is gritty. It's like acidic! It's a tough sound! So that's what I thought." The relationship between the song and drug culture led to the group developing the track "Your Only Friend", a song with anti-drug lyrics, which Jones recalled "didn't even get across like that, people literally, in Chicago, would go get their drugs when that song came on. And I was thinking, Oh crap, you guys, I'm trying to tell you something."

== Re-recording and release ==
'Phuture – "Acid Tracks" (1987) (excerpt)

Unsure how to promote the track, Phuture approached Marshall Jefferson, a house music producer already known for the tracks such as "Move Your Body". Jefferson was performing "Move Your Body" at the Power House in Chicago. Pierre recalled that he wrote a note stating "My name is DJ Pierre. I'm in a group called Phuture, and we did a track called "Acid Tracks", and Ron Hardy has been playing this track off a reel. Could you help us make a record?" The group was in front of a stage where Marshall was performing "Move Your Body", trying to pass him the note. House producer Curtis McClain eventually took the note and passed it on to Jefferson.

Jefferson had recently taken over A&R at Trax Records following Vince Lawrence's departure, and agreed to mix the track, suggesting them to slow it from the original c. 130 beats per minute to about 120 bpm. Although the group initially resisted, Jefferson reassured then that if a DJ wanted to play it faster, they could speed up the record. Jones slowed it to 120 bpm and later claimed that Jefferson's contributions were limited to "setting levels and stuff. But as far as producing, he didn't add any new sounds to it or anything like that". Marshall also suggested changes to the track "Your Only Friend", having Spanky do the vocals instead of Jones, and added a harmonizer to make his voice deeper. Jefferson stated about the recording that he "sat in the studio and watched them", and that Larry Sherman of Trax did not want to put the record out unless Jefferson produced it. "Acid Tracks" was released in 1987.

The band were each paid $1500 from Trax, but were unaware of the track's popularity outside the Chicago area. Looking back, Jones says that the deal "kick-started our careers, so I never look back and complain. I state the fact that Trax is the most crooked label on the planet. But good came of it. Phuture was born, and DJ Pierre was here to stay." "Acid Tracks" was followed up with the single "We Are Phuture" in 1988.

== Reception and legacy ==
"Acid Tracks" became a pioneering song for the acid house movement, especially in the United Kingdom and the acid style became known for the distinctive sound created on the Roland TB-303 Bass Synthesizer. Following the release of "Acid Tracks", countless similar tracks were released.

The tune became popular in British clubs such as London's Shoom and The Haçienda in Manchester. By 1988, the British music press were describing the emerging rave scene as driven by acid house music. Bill Brewster and Frank Broughton, authors of Last Night a DJ Saved My Life, wrote that this scene had many listeners "ignorant of any distinctions", leading to acid house becoming a shorthand for any house music and techno becoming a blanket term in Britain for new electronic dance music. Matt Black, British DJ of Coldcut, described tracks such as "Acid Tracks" and Derrick May's "Nude Photo" having "a phenomenal impact" and that "even straight away you realised that here was a new form of energy that has materialised". British DJ Dave Dorrell recalled that "Acid Tracks" and Armando's "Frequency" and "Land of Confusion" were the first acid house records he got his hands on, stating that "acid house was so far out there that it was beyond anything. There were no direction signs."

Later reception included author Micah Salkind saying that "Acid Tracks" became "[o]ne of Trax Records's most iconic releases", while John Bush of AllMusic gave the song a four-and-a-half star rating out of five, describing it as an "incredibly raw cut ... Still, the superb acid squelch, ripe for the picking by DJs across the world, continued to impress long after the first hundred or so 'covers' and answer records flooded the dance racks." Critic Garry Mulholland noted that other tracks featured an acid house sound prior to the official release of "Acid Tracks", but still included "Acid Tracks" in his book The 500 Greatest Singles Since Punk and Disco, describing it as "the longest, the deepest, the headfuckingest. It fascinated anyone who wanted more than hard disco, and of course, it gave a name to the biggest pop-culture revolution in this book."

== Accolades ==
In 1999, Muzik magazine included the release on their list of the most influential records of all time. In 2015, LA Weekly ranked "Acid Tracks" number 16 in their list of "The 20 Best Dance Music Tracks in History". In 2022, Rolling Stone ranked it number 118 in their list of the "200 Greatest Dance Songs of All Time". In 2025, Billboard magazine ranked it numbers 87 and 34 in their lists of "The 100 Best Dance Songs of All Time" and "The 50 Best House Songs of All Time".

== Track listing ==
- 12" single (TX142)
1. "Acid Tracks" – 12:16
2. "Phuture Jacks" – 7:48
3. "Your Only Friend" – 4:48

== Credits ==
Credits adapted from the singles label sticker.

- Marshall Jefferson – producer, mixing
- DJ Pierre – writer
- Spanky – writer (on "Acid Tracks" and "Phuture Jacks")
- Herbert J – writer (on "Acid Tracks" and "Phuture Jacks")
