= Tyree Cooper =

American house music producer

- Also known as: Tyree
- Origin: Chicago, Illinois, US
- Genres: House, hip house, hip-hop
- Occupation: Record producer
- Years active: 1986–present
- Label: DJ International Records

Tyree Cooper, also known simply as Tyree, is an American house music producer from Chicago, Illinois. He is best known for the hip house track "Turn Up the Bass", which peaked at No. 12 on the UK Singles Chart in 1989.

== Biography ==
Tyree Cooper originally left high school in 1983 with a basketball scholarship, but decided to enter into producing house music, having also DJ'd. His first release was "I Fear the Night" in 1986 on the DJ International Records record label. In 1987, Tyree released what would become a classic of the acid house scene in "Acid Over".

In 1988, Tyree with rapper Kool Rock Steady released the hip house hit "Turn Up The Bass".

== In popular culture ==
Tyree was mentioned in Scooter single Posse (I Need You on the Floor)

== Discography ==
=== Albums ===
- Tyree's Got a Brand New House (DJ International Records, 1988)
- Nation of Hip House (CBS, 1989)
- The Time Iz Now! (DJ International, 1991)

=== Singles/EPs ===
- "I Fear the Night" (Underground, 1986)
- "The Whop" with Fast Eddie (Underground, 1987)
- "Acid Over" (Underground, 1987)
- "Turn Up the Bass" featuring Kool Rock Steady (DJ International Records, 1988)
- "Hardcore Hip House" (DJ International, 1989)
- "Let the Music Take Control" (Indisc, 1989)
- "Move Your Body" featuring J.M.D. (DJ International, 1989)
- "Lonely (No More)" (DJ International, 1990)
- "Rock the Discotech" (DJ International, 1991)
- "Da Butt" (Underground, 1995)
- Smoke 2 Dis E.P. (Dance Mania, 1995)
- "Future Recooped" (Dance Mania, 1997)
- "Say Your Prayer" with Sebastian Krieg (Brickhouse Records, 2001)
- "Green Peppermint Sticks" with Dreye (Sandy Records, 2002)
- Vibration E.P. with Stashrider (Frisbee Tracks, 2004)
- "Wonderland" with Denis Naidanow (Sure Player, 2008)
- "Happy People" with Movi-Starr (Groove Baby Records, 2008)
- "Lost" 2008 with Marc Romboy (Ovum Recordings, 2008)
- "I.C.U." (as ZlemTree) (Supa Dupa Records, 2008)

== See also ==
- Hip House
- List of artists who reached number one on the US Dance chart
