= Derek Harris =

Derek Harris may refer to:

- Dr Derek Harris, the founder of Aston Science Park
- Derek Devlen Harris (1926–1998), actor better known as John Derek
