= Ricky Dillard =

American musician (born 1965)

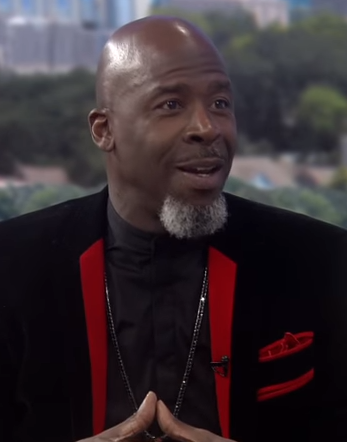
- Dillard in 2018

Background information
- Also known as: Dr. Ricky Dillard
- Born: Ricky Rydell Dillard; February 25, 1965 (age 61); Chicago, Illinois
- Genres: Contemporary Christian music, gospel, Christian R&B, urban contemporary gospel, black gospel, contemporary R&B, house music
- Occupations: Singer, songwriter, and choir director
- Instrument: Vocals
- Years active: 1987–present
- Labels: Muscle Shoals, Malaco, Crystal Rose, EMI Gospel, Light Records, Entertainment One, D.J. International Records, Trax Records, Jack Trax, Motown Gospel

Ricky Rydell Dillard (born February 25, 1965) is an American gospel songwriter, singer, and choir director. He started his music career, in 1987, as a Chicago house musician. His first Christian music album was Promise, by Muscle Shoals Records. His next album, A Holy Ghost Take-Over, was released in 1993 by Malaco Records. The subsequent album, Hallelujah, was released by them in 1995. Crystal Spring Records released, 1996's Work It Out, 2000's No Limit, and Unplugged in 2004. With EMI Gospel, he released, 7th Episode, that came out in 2007. He released, Keep Living, with Light Records in 2011. His next release, AMAZING, came out in 2014 with Entertainment One Music.

All of his Christian albums charted on the Billboard Gospel Albums chart. His No Limit album charted on the Christian Albums chart, and the album Unplugged charted on the Independent Albums chart along with the releases Keep Living, and AMAZING that also charted on The Billboard 200. He was nominated at the Grammy Awards twice, the first time in the Best Contemporary R&B Gospel Album category at the 34th Annual Grammy Awards for Promise, and the second time would come at the 57th Annual Grammy Awards in the category Best Gospel Album for Amazing.

== Early life ==
Dillard was born on February 25, 1965, in Chicago Heights, Illinois, as Ricky Rydell Dillard. His mother and grandmother imparted to him a love of gospel music, and he was raised in the church, singing in the choir at the age of five years, and eventually got the opportunity to direct the youth choir at St. Bethel Baptist Church. In 1981, he formed the first gospel choir at Bloom High School. Around that time, while working as a front desk clerk and later as a file clerk, he performed in a professional Backup band called Love, Salvation & Devotion (LSD) on the weekends. In 1984, he joined the late Milton Brunson's Thompson Community Singers. Also in 1984, he graduated from Bloom Township High School in Chicago Heights, Illinois.

== Music career ==
Dillard started his recording career in 1987 in Chicago house music, to which he was introduced by the "Godfather of House", DJ Frankie Knuckles, a few years ago. In this genre, he collaborated with notable record producers such as Farley "Jackmaster" Funk on It's You (D.J. International Records, 1987) and As Always (Trax Records, 1988). He also worked with deep house pioneer Larry Heard, who was the main producer of Dillard's first album, Let The Music Use You, which was released on Jack Trax in 1989.

With his gospel choir Ricky Dillard's New Generation Chorale, founded in 1988, Dillard released his first gospel album, Promise, on November 28, 1990, on Muscle Shoals Records. It charted on the Billboard Gospel Albums chart at No. 15, and was being nominated at the 34th Annual Grammy Awards in the Best Contemporary R&B Gospel Album category. His second album, A Holy Ghost Take-Over, was released by Malaco Records on May 20, 1993. It charted on the Gospel Albums chart at No. 3. The next album, Hallelujah with Malaco Records, released on May 2, 1995, and it charted at No. 10 on the Gospel Album chart. On October 15, 1996, he released Worked It Out with Crystal Springs Records, and again this would chart on the Top Gospel Albums at No. 8. His next album with them, No Limit, came out on July 18, 2000, and this charted on two Billboard chart the Gospel Albums at No. 10 and Christian Albums at No. 32. While his last release, Unplugged, on the label was released on March 16, 2004, which this charted on the Gospel Albums at No. 9, and this time around charted on the Independent Albums at No. 49. The next album, 7th Episode, came out on October 2, 2007, with EMI Gospel, and this charted at No. 7 on the Gospel Albums chart. Light Records released Keep Living on April 26, 2011, which this charted on the Gospel Albums at No. 3, Independent Albums at No. 9, and on The Billboard 200 at No. 58. He partnered with Entertainment One Music to release, Amazing, on June 10, 2014, and this album charted on The Billboard 200 at No. 28, No. 5 on the Independent Albums, while placing at the top of the Gospel Albums chart. On August 13, 2019, he signed a record deal with Motown Gospel. As an agreement, Dr. Dillard and his choir, New G, did their 11th live recording. On September 28, 2019, he recorded his 11th album, Choirmaster. Choirmaster was released on May 1, 2020. Choirmaster was nominated for two awards at the 63rd Annual Grammy Awards. Dillard also won Traditional Choir of The Year at the 36th Annual Stellar Awards. On July 9, 2021, Dillard recorded his second album with Motown Gospel, 13th of all albums, and 12th gospel album. On September 9, Dillard released his first single from the upcoming album "All of My Help". The song played at the top of every hour on all iHeartRadio gospel stations. On September 17, Dillard released the single on all music streaming platforms. A second single was released, entitled "Behold Christ the Lord", on October 29, 2021, on every music streaming platform. Since then he has released three more singles, "Breakthrough", "He Won't Fail" and "Making Room" on December 2, December 9, and January 6, respectively. On January 21, 2022, Dillard released his "Breakthrough: The Exodus" album. He later appeared on The Kelly Clarkson Show singing "All of My Help" on February 22. He was nominated for several Dove Awards and won for "Traditional Gospel Album of the Year". On September 9th, 2023, Dr. Dillard and New G, his choir, recorded their 13th album in Liberty Township, Ohio, just outside of Cincinnati. Dr. Dillard was honored with Congressional Recognition for 35 years of gospel music excellence by The Honorable Sheila Jackson-Lee. On November 3rd, he released the single from the recording titled "Hold On". A month later on December 1, he released a second single titled "When I Think". The full album titled "Choirmaster II" will be released on January 26, 2024. Ricky Dillard, in partnership with Ron Carter, recorded "Sweet, Sweet Spirit" at Fellowship Chicago Church in November 2025, and was consequently released in February 2026. The record blended Hymns and Traditional Gospel, with Jazz and R&B.

== Discography ==
List of albums, with selected chart positions
Title	Album details	Peak chart positions			
Title	Album details	US	US Gos	US Indie	US Christ
Let the Music Use You	Released: 1989; Label: Jack Trax; Formats: LP, CD	–	–	–	–
The Promise	Released: July 5, 1991; Label: Muscle Shoals; Formats: CD, digital download	–	15	–	–
A Holy Ghost Take-Over	Released: May 20, 1993; Label: Malaco; Formats: CD, digital download	–	3	–	–
Hallelujah!	Released: May 2, 1995; Label: Malaco; Formats: CD, digital download	–	10	–	–
Worked It Out	Released: October 15, 1996; Label: Crystal Spring; Formats: CD, digital download	–	8	–	–
No Limit	Released: July 18, 2000; Label: Crystal Spring; Formats: CD, digital download	–	10	–	32
Unplugged: The Way Church Used to Be	Released: March 16, 2004; Label: Crystal Spring; Formats: CD, digital download	–	9	49	–
7th Episode: Live in Toronto	Released: October 2, 2007; Label: EMI Gospel; Formats: CD, digital download	–	7	–	–
Keep Living	Released: April 26, 2011; Label: Light; Formats: CD, digital download	58	3	9	–
Amazing	Released: June 10, 2014; Label: Entertainment One; Formats: CD, digital download	28	1	5	–
10	Released: September 15, 2017; Label: Entertainment One; Formats: CD, digital download	143	1	–	–
Choirmaster	Released: May 1, 2020; Label: Motown Gospel; Formats: CD, digital download	_	2	_	_
Breakthrough:The Exodus	Released: January 21, 2022; Label: Motown Gospel; Formats: CD, digital download	_	6	_	_
Choirmaster ll: Live in Liberty Township, Ohio	Released: January 26, 2024; Label: Motown Gospel; Formats: CD, digital download	_	8	_	_
Sweet, Sweet Spirit (with Ron Carter)	Released: February 6, 2026; Label: Motown Gospel; Formats: CD, digital download	_	11	_	_

== Awards and nominations ==
=== GMA Dove Awards ===
The Dove Awards are awarded annually by the Gospel Music Association. Dillard has been inducted into the Hall of Fame and has also received 2 awards from 13 nominations.

Year	Category	Work	Result
2008	Traditional Gospel Recorded Song of the Year	"The Light" (with New G)	Nominated
2012	Traditional Gospel Recorded Song of the Year	"God Is Great" (with New G)	Nominated
2014	Traditional Gospel Recorded Song of the Year	"Amazing" (with New G)	Nominated
2015	Traditional Gospel Album of the Year	Amazing (with New G)	Nominated
2018	Traditional Gospel Album of the Year	10 (with New G)	Nominated
2018	Traditional Gospel Recorded Song of the Year	"I Survived It" (with New G)	Nominated
2021	Traditional Gospel Album of the Year	Choirmaster (with New G)	Nominated
2022	Traditional Gospel Album of the Year	Breakthrough: The Exodus (Live) (with New G)	Won
2022	Traditional Gospel Recorded Song of the Year	"All Of My Help (Live)" (with New G)	Nominated
2023	Traditional Gospel Recorded Song of the Year	"It Is Well" (as songwriter)	Won
2024	Traditional Gospel Recorded Song of the Year	"When I Think (Live)" (with New G)	Nominated
2024	Traditional Gospel Album of the Year	Choirmaster II: Live in Liberty Township, Ohio(with New G)	Nominated
2025	Gospel Music Hall of Fame	Himself	Inducted
2025	Traditional Gospel Recorded Song of the Year	"When I Think (Radio Edit / Live)"	Nominated

=== Grammy Awards ===
The Grammy Awards are awarded annually by the National Academy of Recording Arts and Sciences. Dillard has received 8 nominations.

Year	Category	Work	Result
1992	Best Contemporary Soul Gospel Album	The Promise	Nominated
2005	Best Gospel Choir Or Chorus Album	Unplugged... The Way Church Used To Be (with New G)	Nominated
2015	Best Gospel Album	Amazing (Live) (with New G)	Nominated
2021	Best Gospel Album	Choirmaster	Nominated
2021	Best Gospel Performance/Song	"Release (Live)"	Nominated
2023	Best Gospel Album	Breakthrough: The Exodus (Live)	Nominated
2025	Best Gospel Album	Choirmaster II (Live)	Nominated
2025	Best Gospel Performance/Song	"Hold On (Live)"	Nominated

=== Stellar Awards ===
The Stellar Awards are awarded annually by SAGMA. Dillard has received 1 honorary award and 14 competitive awards from 41 nominations.

Year	Category	Work	Result
2001	Choir of the Year	No Limit (with New G)	Nominated
2001	Contemporary Choir of the Year	No Limit (with New G)	Nominated
2005	Contemporary Choir of the Year	Unplugged: the Way Church Used To Be (with New G)	Nominated
2005	Male Vocalist of the Year	Unplugged: the Way Church Used To Be (with New G)	Nominated
2009	Choir of the Year	The 7th Episode: Live in Toronto (with New G)	Won
2009	Contemporary Choir of the Year	The 7th Episode: Live in Toronto (with New G)	Won
2009	Artist of the Year	The 7th Episode: Live in Toronto (with New G)	Nominated
2009	CD of the Year	The 7th Episode: Live in Toronto (with New G)	Nominated
2012	Choir of the Year	Keep Living (with New G)	Won
2012	Traditional CD of the Year	Keep Living (with New G)	Nominated
2012	Traditional Choir of the Year	Keep Living (with New G)	Nominated
2012	Music Video of the Year – Long Form	"Keep Living" (with New G)	Nominated
2015	Choir of the Year	Amazing (with New G)	Won
2015	Traditional CD of the Year	Amazing (with New G)	Won
2015	Traditional Choir of the Year	Amazing (with New G)	Won
2015	Artist of the Year	Amazing (with New G)	Nominated
2015	CD of the Year	Amazing (with New G)	Nominated
2015	Male Vocalist of the Year	Amazing (with New G)	Nominated
2015	Producer of the Year	Amazing (with New G)	Nominated
2015	Traditional Male Vocalist of the Year	Amazing (with New G)	Nominated
2018	Choir of the Year	10 (with New G)	Nominated
2018	Traditional CD of the Year	10 (with New G)	Nominated
2018	Traditional Choir of the Year	10 (with New G)	Nominated
2018	Traditional Male Vocalist of the Year	10 (with New G)	Nominated
2021	Traditional Choir of the Year	Choirmaster	Won
2021	Choir of the Year	Choirmaster	Nominated
2022	James Cleveland Lifetime Achievement Award	Himself	Honored
2022	Choir of the Year	Breakthrough: The Exodus	Won
2022	Traditional Choir of the Year	Breakthrough: The Exodus	Won
2022	Traditional Male Artist of the Year	Breakthrough: The Exodus	Won
2022	Song of the Year	"All My Help"	Nominated
2024	Choir of the Year	Choirmaster II	Won
2024	Traditional Choir of the Year	Choirmaster II	Won
2024	Album of the Year	Choirmaster II	Nominated
2024	Traditional Album of the Year	Choirmaster II	Nominated
2024	Traditional Artist of the Year	Choirmaster II	Nominated
2024	Traditional Male Artist of the Year	Choirmaster II	Nominated
2025	Choir of the Year	When I Think	Won
2025	Traditional Choir of the Year	When I Think	Won
2026	Traditional Duo/Chorus Group of the Year	Sweet, Sweet Spirit (with Ron Carter)	Nominated
2026	Traditional Album of the Year	Sweet, Sweet Spirit (with Ron Carter)	Nominated
2026	Special Event Album of the Year	Sweet, Sweet Spirit (with Ron Carter)	Nominated
