= DJ Pierre =

American DJ and house music producer

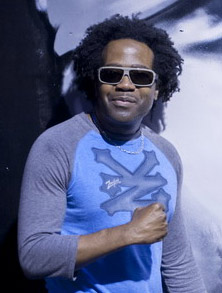
- DJ Pierre

Background information
- Born: Nathaniel Pierre Jones; Chicago, Illinois, U.S.
- Genres: Acid house, house, techno
- Occupations: Musician, DJ, record producer, remixer
- Years active: 1987–present
- Labels: Trax Records, Strictly Rhythm, Get Physical Music, Numbers, Afro Acid
- Member of: Phuture
- Website: https://www.facebook.com/djpierreacid

Nathaniel Pierre Jones, better known by his stage name DJ Pierre, is an American DJ and house record producer, based in Chicago.

== Musical career ==
=== Phuture ===
Jones has recorded Audio Clash, Darkman, Disco Fuhrer, DJ Pierre, DJ Pierre's Afro Acid Project, Doomsday, M & M, Nathaniel Pierre Jones, One Screaming Idiot, P-Ditty, Pfantasia, Photon Inc., Phugitive, Phuture Scope, Pierre's Pfantasy Club, Raving Lunatics, the Don, Time Warp, X Fade, and Yvette. He formed the group Phuture with his friends Spanky (Earl Smith Jr. –founder/technical producer) and Herb J (Herbert R Jackson Jr. - keyboards). During the late-1980s, the trio began using the squelch sound that became common in Acid House recordings after the group's initial experiments with a Roland TB-303 bass line synthesizer. Living in the Chicago area, they were exposed to many house artists, such as Hot Mix 5 artists (Farley "Jackmaster" Funk, Ralphi "The Razz" Rosario, Kenny "Jammin" Jason, Mickey "Mixin" Oliver, and Scott "Smokin" Silz) who were producing many tapes and vinyl recordings. Frankie Knuckles was DJing and the Warehouse club (from where house music may have derived its name).

=== First recordings ===
Pierre and Spanky had been to Chicago DJ Ron Hardy's club called The Music Box. The first Acid House track the group recorded was "Acid Tracks" (renamed by Ron Hardy from its original title, "In Your Mind"), which had a slow burning, bass-heavy, deep sound, and was over eleven minutes long. Their first track was put on tape and first played in the Music Box club in the late-1980s. Ron Hardy played it several times on its first night. It was rerecorded at Trax Records (produced by Marshall Jefferson) and released in 1986.

DJ Pierre went on to record many of the early Acid House tracks on Trax Records under the names Phuture, Phuture Pfantasy Club, Pierre's Pfantasy Club (with Felix Da Housecat), and Phortune with songs such as "Your Only Friend," "The Creator," "String Free," "Got the Bug," "Box Energy," "Dream Girl," "Mystery Girl," "Fantasy Girl," "We are Phuture," "Slam," and "Spank Spank." DJ Pierre's track "Your Only Friend" describes his addiction to drugs at the time.

=== Other releases ===
In 1990, DJ Pierre briefly moved from Chicago and joined Strictly Rhythm Records, where he was also briefly an A&R executive. DJ Pierre did not have a contract that stated if music he produced was licensed overseas to other record labels, he would share in this revenue. Other songs he released included "Generate Power" by Photon Inc, "Follow Me" by Aly-Us, and "The Horn Song" featuring Barbara Tucker, later released as "Everybody Dance (The Horn Song)." He is still DJing and producing; on January 14, 2007, he appeared on Pete Tong's Essential Mix on British BBC Radio 1. Tong inducted DJ Pierre into his dance music Hall of Fame in 2013. He appeared on the Essential Mix program again in 2017. In 2011, he released the Track "Alpha Omega" together with Kris Menace on the PIAS sub-label Different.
