= Trax Records =

Trax Records LTD
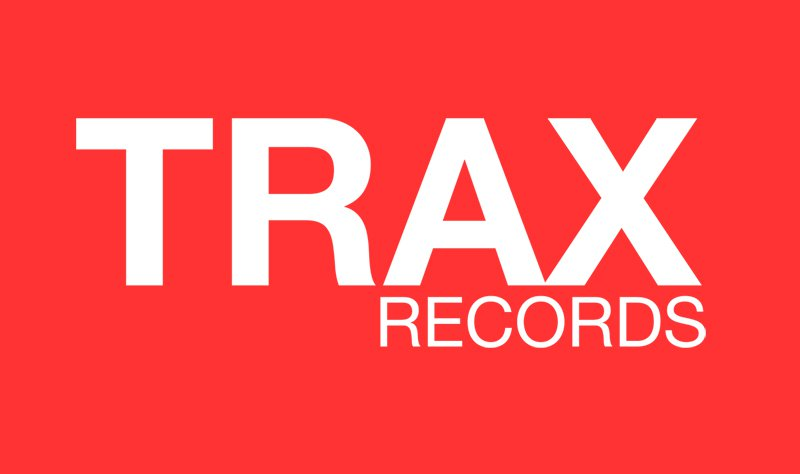
- Founded: 1984
- Founder: Larry Sherman
- Genre: House
- Country of origin: United States
- Location: Chicago, Illinois
- Official website: traxrecords.net

Trax Records is an American independent record label based in Chicago, Illinois, United States. It played a major part in the development of house music.

== History ==
Larry Sherman was originally a collector of vintage jukeboxes, and, frustrated with the limited range of records began operations in 1983 by purchasing Musical Products, a pressing plant in Chicago's Bridgeport neighborhood.. Though it is frequently said that Jesse Saunders and Vince Lawrence were co-founders there is no documentation to corroborate this. The initial artist signings were done by Vince Lawrence. The first release was "Wanna Dance/Certainly" by Le Noiz (a pseudonym of Jesse Saunders), release number TX-101.

Trax Records was an important outlet for house music in its early days, releasing many classics including "No Way Back" by Adonis (1986), Jamie Principle and Frankie Knuckles's "Your Love" (1988), Larry Heard's "Can You Feel It" (1986), and Marshall Jefferson's "The House Music Anthem (Move Your Body)" in the same year. This latter tune gave a massive boost to house music, extending recognition of the genre outside of Chicago.

In 1991, Trax declared bankruptcy when distributors owing Trax 4.5 million dollars went out of business.

In 2002, Trax Records formed a joint venture with Casablanca Media in Canada. Litigation started in 2004. By 2005 all of the classic materials ownership was awarded to Casablanca in Canada. Lawyers for the Creative Arts took Sherman & Cain’s case pro-bono, as they proved to have no funds, or be making any income from Casablanca who became the catalogue owners. They were represented by Rick Darke of the Duane Morris law firm.

In 2007, Sherman and his wife, Rachel Cain, who had married in 1995, divorced. Sherman received 50% of the Trax Records library. In 2008 Chicago court reversed the previous ruling under which Casablanca had seized Trax's assets, and they reverted to Sherman and Cain.

Many years of litigation finally ended on January 1, 2022. According to a statement posted to Facebook in 2022, royalty systems were being put in place by Cain.. There is also an amount of money held specifically in a trust for the artists who sign off from the exclusive Demon Records deal that Casablanca instituted.

Sherman was criticized for poor-quality vinyl pressings (partially due to the use of recycled vinyl), missing royalty payments, and a lack of interaction with the artists on his roster. DJ Pierre of Phuture once claimed “Trax never paid me royalties”, and Jamie Principle, who sang "Your Love", alleged he was not properly signed to the label, saying they “literally just stole my stuff”. Frankie Knuckles publicly criticized reissues of his former material, and distanced himself from the label. However, the Knuckles estate and their Attorney Jeffrey Becker subsequently worked with TRAX to preserve Knuckles' writing, productions and master recordings. Monies are currently on hold for the titles Knuckles did with Trax. Jamie Principle disputes Frankie Knuckles had any involvement. There are two judgements in favor of Knuckles credibility both in the United States and the UK.

In a 2014 statement, the label's former creative director Jorge Cruz acknowledged the numerous disputes, saying: "The reality is that the Trax Records name is making money but much of the money is not reaching the label or the artists. We cannot change the past or the legal battles that are tied to it."

In June 2020, Robert Owens and Larry Heard filed lawsuits against Trax, alleging as “musicians hungry for their first break,” Owens and Heard “were lulled into a business relationship with an unscrupulous record company.” The plaintiffs “signed away valuable rights to their music” for inadequate compensation, the filing continues, and Trax Records failed to pay the owed royalties and wages. Trax asserts and Heard admits that he signed a contract assigning the copyright in the music for his three biggest hits, Can You Feel It, Washing Machine and Beyond the Clouds.

Heard closed four contracts with the brand around 1985–1987, and though the lawsuit describes various issues and omissions with each (including missing signatures and not covering copyrights specifically), they centered mainly on his transferring the rights to hit songs for $3,000 apiece and, in some of the deals, a guarantee of 15 percent of sales revenue. More broadly, the label allegedly “exploited the artists’ other musical works” without permission (contractual or otherwise) throughout the last four or so decades, including by releasing unauthorized vinyl records and failing to turn over royalty payments. The lawsuit also describes the plight of different musicians who have allegedly been denied their due royalties from Trax Records, including Adonis, a pioneering acid house artist. The Chicago native received publicity for his quest to collect 34 years' worth of back pay from Trax, writing in 2020 that he still hasn't "received one word from that shameless label."

In November 2020, Trax filed to dismiss seven of the eight counts raised in Owens & Heard's complaint.

== Discography ==
=== 12" singles ===
- TX101—Le Noiz "Wanna Dance/Certainly"
- TX102—Jesse Velez "Girls Out On the Floor"
- TX103—Le Noiz "I'm Scared/Get Out"
- TX104 -- Jack Master Funk "Jack the Bass"
- TX105—Kevin Irvin "Ride the Rhythm [Remix]"
- TX106 -- Farley Jackmaster Funk "Funkin With Drums Again"
- TX107 -- Vince Lawrence "Virgo Tracks Again"
- TX108—Jesse Velez "Super Rhythm Trax"
- TX109 -- Ron Hardy "Sensation"
- TX110 -- Screamin' Rachael "My Main Man"
- TX111—Man Goes Disco "Sensuous Woman"
- TX112 -- Adonis "No Way Back"
- TX113 -- Sleezy D "I've Lost Control"
- TX114 -- Marshall Jefferson "Virgo/Free Yourself/R U Hot Enough"
- TX115—Fresh "Dum Dum Part Two"
- TX116 -- The Rude Boy Farley Keith "Give Yourself to Me"
- TX117 -- Marshall Jefferson "The House Music Anthem"
- TX118—Master C & J "When You Hold Me"
- TX119—Sweet D "Thank Ya/Do It"
- TX120 -- Adonis "We're Rockin Down the House"
- TX121—On the House "Ride the Rhythm [Original]"
- TX122—Willie Wonka: "What is House"
- TX123—Radio Fashion "You Get What You Deserve"
- TX124—Farm Boy: "Jackin’ Me Around"
- TX125—Fat Albert "Beat Me Til I Jack"
- TX126—Santos "Work the Box"
- TX127 -- Mr. Fingers: "Can U Feel It/Washing Machine"
- TX128—Sampson “Butch” Moore: "House Beat Box"
- TX129—Jungle Wonz: "The Jungle"
- TX130—Boris Badenough: "Hey, Rocky" (Artist was Dean Anderson though often mis-credited as Frankie Knuckles)
- TX131 -- Lidell Townsell: "Party People"
- TX132 -- Robert Owens: "Bringin’ Down the Wall"
- TX133—Terry Baldwin: "Housemaster"
- TX134—Two House People: "Move My Body"
- TX135—Jungle Wonz: "Time Marches On"
- TX136—On the House: "Give Me Back the Love"
- TX137—Mr. Lee "I Can't Forget"
- TX138—Mystery "Mystery Girl"
- TX139—Eric Bell "Your Love"
- TX140—Mr. Lee "Came to House"
- TX141—William S "I'll Never Let You Go"
- TX142 -- Phuture: "Acid Tracks"
- TX144—Dalis "Rock Steady"
- TX145—Kevin Irving "Children of the Night"
- TX146—Two of a Kind "Somewhere in West Hell"
- TX147—Pleasure Zone "Charley/House Nation"
- TX148—Dr. Derelict "Doctor"
- TX149—Dean Anderson "Don't Stop/Don't Dub"
- TX150 -- Frankie Knuckles Presents "Baby Wants to Ride/Your Love"
- TX151—Frankie Knuckles Presents "It's a Cold World"
- TX152 -- Hercules "Lost in the Groove"
- TX153—Dancer "Am a Dog/Boom Boom"
- TX154—Evie "Stay the Night"
- TX155—Rich Martinez "Are You Ready"
- TX156—Mr. Lee "House this House"
- TX157 -- Pierre's Phantasy Club "Got the Bug"
- TX158 -- Lidell Townsell "Get the Hole"
- TX159—Curtis McClaine "Let's Get Busy"
- TX160—Dancer "Number Nine"
- TX164—Pleasure Zone "Fantasy/I Can't Understand"
- TX165 -- Phuture "We Are Phuture EP"
- TX166—Mr. Lee "Pump Up Chicago/London/New York"
- TX167—Donald Rush "Knockin at my Door"
- TX168—Mike Wilson "Hit Tracks III"
- TX169 -- Maurice Joshua "I Gotta Big Dick/This is Acid"
- TX170 -- Lidell Townsell "Jack the House EP"
- TX171—Mr. Lee - "Acid Fantaslee"
- TX172 -- Farley "Jackmaster Funk" Presents Ricky Dillard – As Always"
- TX173—K.G.B. "Respect Rap"
- TX174—Kool Rock Steady "Power Move"
- TX175—Virgo Four "Virgo Vol. 4/Do You Know Who You Are"
- TX176—M.E. "Ride"
- TX177—Grand and Dezz "You're Too Good"
- TX178—Scamara "Kisses Never Lie"
- TX179—J.R. "It's About House"
- TX180—Samurai Sam "House Japanese"
- TX182—Kamia "Take Me I'm Yours"
- TX184 -- Maurice "Get Into the Dance"
- TX185—Kipetotec "Sex Sells"
- TX187—Gotham City "Bat Trax"
- TX190—Streetlife "Streetlife/I Will Survive"
- TX191—MTS & RTT "Native House"
- TX192—Streetlife "Glow of Love"
- TX193—Streetlife "Tearin Down the Walls"
- TX194—Marshall Jefferson "Move Your Body '90"
- TX195 -- Yvonne Gage "Bad Girls/Heartbreak Hotel"
- TX196—M.E. feat. Yvonne Gage "Winter Days/Summer"
- TX197—Humanoid "Slam"
- TX198—Bart Starr "Way To Go Homer" - written by Jesse Saunders
- TX199 -- Ralphi Rosario "Running Away"
- TX200—Over 2 U "Force of Habit"
- TX201—Humanoid "Crystal (Back Together)/The Deep"
- TX202 -- Lidell & The People "Another Lover"
- TX203—Bazz "Very Well"
- TX204—The Music Factory "It's Getting Late"
- TX205—Kevin Irving "Puppet/About That Time"
- TX301 -- Fast Eddie "Yeah Yeah Yeah"
- TX302 -- Black Man "Beat that Bitch with a Bat"
- TX303—Johnny Fiasco "Iz U Iz Or Iz You Ain't My Baby"
- TX304 -- Farley Jackmaster Funk / Housemaster Boys "Love Can't Turn Around/House Nation"
- TX305—Fast Eddie "No Other Love"
- TX306 -- Joe Smooth "Untitled"
- TX307 -- ???
- TX309 -- ???
- TX308 -- Amber "A Matter of Time"
- TX310—K. Kool (K. Alexi) "Hot Swing/Hot Summer Swing"
- TX311—The Fusion EP
- TX312 -- ???
- TX313—United Freaks of America "Get Up Off Your Ass"
- TX314—Hercules "Streetfighter"
- TX315—Jungle Wonz "Bird in a Gilded Cage"
- TX316—Ramovia "Your Love"
- TX317—Pound "Move Yo' Body Again"
- TX404—Adonis "Basement Jaxx Remixes"
- TX417—David Chong "There is no place / Our Last Chance"
- TX418—Hydraulic Funk "Flash Light/Godzilla/Godzilla Rap (Feat. Afrika Bambaataa & M.C. G.L.O.B.E.)"
- TX419—Dave Robertson "Liquidity & Warmth/Loss of a Love"
- TX420—Maurice "Desires"
- TX421—Frankie Knuckles "Waiting on my Angel" (2002)
- TX467—Various Artists "Best of Movi' Record Vol. 1"
- TX468—David Chong "Auto Ed"
- TX476—Mr. Fingers "The complete can you feel i(Martin Luther King RX)"
- TX481—Naked Soul "Keep On Movin'"
- TX486—Screamin' Rachel "Don't make me lonely"

=== LPs and EPs ===
- TX107/114—Virgo Tracks Again/Virgo "Free Yourself"
- TX5001—Various: “Chicago Trax Volume 1”
- TX5003—Various "Acid Trax Volume 1"
- TX5004—Various "Acid Trax Volume 2"
- TX5005 -- Steve Poindexter Featuring "Short Circuit"
- TX5007—Various "Acid Trax Volume 3"
- TX5011—Various "Frankie Knuckles Presents"
- TX5016 -- Armando Presents The New World Order
- TX5017—Acid Wash - Written by J. Lopez
- TX5018—Lost Trax - Previously unreleased tracks by Mr. Fingers
- TX5019—K. Kool (K. Alexi) "Trick Tracks"
- TX5020—Phurture (K. Alexi) "Lost Souls”
- TX5021—Ralph Rosario's Greatest Hits
- TX5022DP -- Joey Beltram Presents "Dance Generator" (Double pack)
- TX5023—XXX Tracks
- TX5024—Armando "The New World Order Level 3"
- TX5025—Kaay Alexi Shelby & Brazil 94 "Untitled"
- TX5027—The Beltram Re-releases 1989-1991
- TX5032—Armando Presents the New World Order 4 94
- TX5033 -- Steve Stoll "Octaves"
- TX5034 -- Frankie Bones "Bone Up!"
- TX5035—Steve Stoll "FM"
- TX5036 -- ???
- TX5037 -- ???
- TX5038 -- ???
- TX5039 -- ???
- TX5040 -- ???
- TX5041—Acid Trax IV (1996)
- TX5042 -- ???
- TX5043 -- ???
- TX5044 -- ???
- TX5045 -- DJ Rush "Klub Kidz" (1996)
- TX5085DP -- "Anyone Can Dance" by Crystal Distortion (Double Pack)
- TX5086DP -- "Contaminated 2G" by Gene Hunt (Double Pack)
- TX2007 -- "In The Beginning (Nic Sarno Remake) by Nic Sarno
- TX4563 -- "Freaks" by Sir Nenis
- TX1971 -- "The Flow" by Nic Sarno
- TX1360 -- "Every Night I Say A Prayer" by Little Boots
- TX10092011 -- "Don't Stop" by Sir Nenis & Roby Howler
- TX082603 -- "Purple Mountains Majestic" by Sir Nenis & Marked Man

=== CDs and compilations ===
- CDTX5001–20th Anniversary Collection by Various Artists
- CDTX5002–Next Generation by Various Artists (2004)
- CDTX5003–Acid Classics by Various Artists (2004)
- CDTX5004–Queer Trax — Coming in Loud and Queer by Various Artists (2004)
- CDTX5005–Rarities & B-Sides by Various Artists (2004)
- CDTX5006–Extacy by Screamin Rachael (2004)
- CDTX5010–Twilight Trax by Various Artists (2005)
- CDTX5011–Trax Classix by Armando (2005)
- CDTX5013–Trax Classix by Joey Beltram (2005)
- CDTX5016–Trax Classix by Phuture and DJ Pierre (2005)
- TX9725–Trax Records: The 25th Anniversary Collection by Various Artists (2011)
- TX062810–SUMMERTRAX by Various Artists (2012)
- TX062003–Screamin' Rachael: Queen of House by Screamin' Rachael (2013)
- TRX UK CD001–The House that Trax Built by Trax Records 1996

== See also ==
- List of record labels
