= Hot Mix 5 =

American DJ Group

The Hot Mix 5 are an American DJ team originating from Chicago, Illinois, who were chosen by WBMX Program Director, Lee Michaels in 1981 to create what was called, Hot Mixes for a radio show Lee named, "Saturday Night Live, Ain't no Jive". Founding team members included Farley "Funkin" Keith (later known as Farley "Jackmaster" Funk), Mickey "Mixin" Oliver, Ralphi Rosario, Kenny "Jammin" Jason, and Scott "Smokin", Silz,. The show rose to #1 in the Chicago radio ratings garnering over 2 million listeners. WBMX in turn rose from the last place music radio station to the Chicagoland #1 radio station. In 1984, Scott Silz was asked to leave the group and was replaced by Julian Perez. Perez's tenure lasted about a year and then after he was asked to leave, several Djs were invited to guest on the WBMX Hot Mix 5 mix show. Steve Hurley, Mario "Smokin" Diaz, Martin Luna and Frankie Hollywood were all guest Djs. The Hot mix 5 radio show switched to WGCI around 1986 where they quickly became the #1 show on WGCI. Mario "Smokin" Diaz, became a member of the group during the switch to WGCI as he had the longest tenure with the Hot Mix 5 throughout their radio dominance in Chicago.

== Background ==
The Hot Mix 5 were created as the resident DJs on Chicago FM radio station WBMX's Saturday Night Live Ain't No Jive mix show hosted by Armando Rivera. Shortly after, additional programming such as Friday Night Jams, Mini Mixes and specialty edited remixes were added. The Chicago house music scene grew as the Hot Mix 5 show and WBMX became the #1 radio show in Chicago which obtained over 2 Million viewers. Mickey Oliver became known by his editing and turntable skills, and Keith, Rosario and Jason each had their own unique styles.

The City of Chicago recognized the Hot Mix 5's contribution to the creation of house music and honored them by presenting each original member with an individual street named after them, and in addition a street called "Hot Mix 5 Way", which is located in downtown Chicago on the corner of Michigan Avenue and Balbo Drive. Mickey Oliver's street sign is located at the Belmont Red Line stop On Belmont & Wilton. Farley's street sign is located at 13th & Michigan. Kenny Jason was presented with a street sign which is called DJ Kenny Jammin Jason Boulevard, located on the corner of Kedzie and Logan Blvd near Logan Square in Chicago.

Mickey Oliver went on to have a major theatrical production at the Planet Hollywood casino in Las Vegas. Intensi-T, a Las Vegas live stage show, consisted of aerialists, musicians, dancers and Mickey singing his original classics as well as him performing live turntable antics. The show told the story of how House Music became a world wide genre that grew out of the streets of Chicago where it was aired on the #1 rated Chicago radio show, the Hot Mix 5 Mix show. The Hot Mix 5 show on WBMX aired the birth of this brand new genre. Chicago Underground musicians and the Hot Mix 5 created these new what they called tracks which led this new vibe to be called House Music. The genre became officially named House Music during the WBMX Hot Mix 5 show during the early to mid 80's.

Mickey went on to star as Actor #! on the TV show called Intensi-T TV, which aired on ABC Las Vegas, Direct TV and Dish Network.

The Guardian, widely known as the #1 publication in the world named the Hot Mix 5 as one of the top 10 DJs of all time. Voodoo Pizza, a pizza shop in London, has previously served a Hot Mix 5 themed pizza. ON September 27th, 2026, the Hot Mix 5 at the Harris Theater in downtown Chicago, were Inducted into the Illinois Rock and Roll Hall of Fame. This historic dedication recognizing the legacy of the Hot Mix 5 has cemented them into History along with the world's top musicians. The Hot Mix 5 DJs continue to perform globally.
