= Ron Hardy =

American musician

Background information
- Born: May 8, 1958
- Died: March 2, 1992 (aged 33) Chicago, Illinois, U.S.
- Genres: House, disco, soul, funk
- Occupations: DJ, music producer

Ron Hardy (May 8, 1958 – March 2, 1992) was an American, Chicago, Illinois-based DJ and record producer of early house music. He is well known for playing records at the Muzic Box, a Chicago house music club. Decades after his death, he is recognized for his innovative edits and mixes of disco, soul music, funk and early house music.

== Early career ==
Hardy started his career in 1974 in Chicago's gay club Den One. Here, with a set-up of two turntables, a mixer and a reel-to-reel tape-deck, he played long nights of underground dance music. Around 1977, he went to work in Los Angeles. At the end of 1982, when DJ Frankie Knuckles left the Warehouse to open the Power Plant, Ron Hardy DJed at the Warehouse's new location until Robert Williams renamed it "The Music Box." Producer Chip E. introduced Hardy to recording music in 1986 when the two mixed "Donnie" by The It (featuring Chip E., Larry Heard, Robert Owens, and Harri Dennis). From humble beginnings, Hardy's contributions to house music are considered influential.

== Mixing style ==
While Frankie Knuckles at the Warehouse (and later the Power Plant) had a smooth style of playing, Hardy had less regard for sound quality and would play with a manic energy, mixing everything from classic Philadelphia disco classics, Italo disco imports to new wave, disco and rock tracks. Hardy also pitched records up way more than Knuckles (pitch being the difference between normal speed and the speed at which the record is currently playing. Usually expressed as + or -, with 8 being maximum/minimum). Techno artist Derrick May remembers hearing Hardy playing a Stevie Wonder cut with the speed at +8.

Hardy's style incorporated constant tension met with release, with a pulsing narrative that enchanted the wild crowds of the Music Box. In contrast to Frankie Knuckles, Hardy's mark on house music was endless energy and using a variety of techniques to keep the audience on their toes. Most notably, when Hardy was playing at the Music Box, it was guaranteed to be loud, as evidenced by first-hand recollections of what a night there felt like: "The Music Box was so loud that anywhere in the club, the bass would physically move you-not just on the dancefloor, but anywhere in the club!" All of these factors, including Hardy's own emotional investment in the music, created an intense atmosphere on the dance floor.

== Trademarks ==
Hardy played a lot of reel-to-reel edits and was always tweaking the soundsystem and playing with the EQ. A Ron Hardy trademark was playing a track backwards. Theo Parrish and several others have said that he did this by turning the needle upside down and putting the record on a cylinder so the needle played the underside of the record, although Stacey Collins says that he did this by using a reel-to-reel. Hardy's residence-club The Music Box was also known for its loud sound.

== Favorite song selections in early 1980s ==
Hardy opened his nights with "Welcome to the Pleasuredome" by Frankie Goes to Hollywood. Among the classic disco that was a staple in Chicago clubs at the time, typical tracks one could also hear him play were Visage - "Frequency 7", Klein & MBO - "Dirty Talk", ESG - "Moody", Patrick Adams - "Big Phreek", Liquid Liquid - "Optimo", First Choice - "Let No Man Put Asunder", "Ain't No Mountain High Enough", Eurythmics - "Sweet Dreams" and Talk Talk - "It's My Life". Hardy also played electronic body music acts like Nitzer Ebb.

== Beginnings of Chicago house ==
In the first half of the 1980s, many Chicago DJs and clubgoers started experimenting with creating their own rhythm tracks. DJs would play these homemade tracks, and subsequently, house music was born in Chicago. Hardy would often get the hottest acetates and tapes. Chicago producers, including Marshall Jefferson, Larry Heard, Adonis, Phuture's DJ Pierre and Chip E., all debuted a lot of their compositions at The Muzic Box. When DJ Pierre and his friends Herb and Spanky created a weird squelching rhythm track from a Roland TB-303 bassline machine, they gave this track to Hardy. The first time he played it, the dancers left the floor. Hardy played the track three more times that night, and by the fourth time the audience was going crazy. The track became known as "Acid Tracks", and released under the band name Phuture.

Hardy continued a successful DJ-residency at The Music Box until the end of the 1980s and quickly changed his playlist to encompass more and more house music.

== Later life and death ==
In 1987, a city law requiring after-hours clubs to close nightly at the same time as bars (which has since been rescinded) was passed. The Music Box closed that year. After the closure of the club, Hardy continued to DJ at various events around Chicago. He also battled with heroin addiction. He died of an AIDS-related illness on March 2, 1992.

In 2004, two bootleg 12" records were released with "Ron's edits" and in 2005, Partehardy Records, run by his nephew Bill released authentic edits not heard in over 20 years. There is also another bootleg series of edits called "Music Box", containing either genuine Hardy re-edits or tributes by other DJs imitating his editing style. DJ Theo Parrish also made a series of tribute-remixes called "Ugly Edits" some of which bear a striking resemblance to Hardy's re-edits. These have been bootlegged too. Some of DJ Harvey's Black Cock edits records are tributes to Hardy's edits as well.

In addition to his DJ mixes, long-buried original productions have also come to light—among them, "Throwback 87", a collaboration between Ron Hardy and Gene Hunt.

Ron Hardy has a section dedicated to him on the second DVD of the DJ documentary Maestro.

== Sources ==
- Arnold, Jacob (May 18, 2015). "Ron Hardy at The Music Box". Red Bull Music Academy.
