= Roland TB-303 =

Bass synthesizer

Roland TB-303 Bass Line
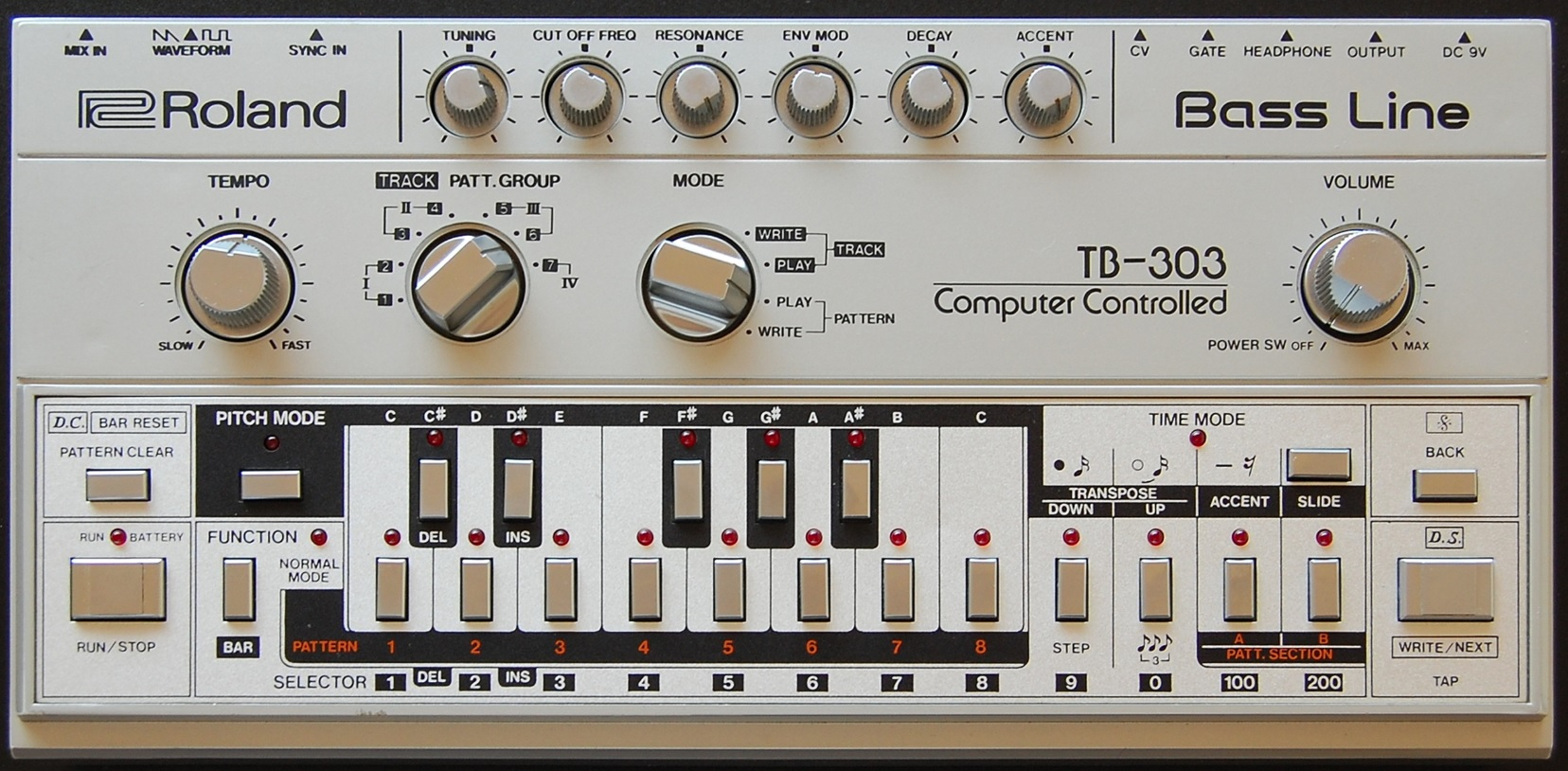
- TB-303 front panel
- Manufacturer: Roland
- Dates: 1981–1984
- Price: UK £238 (£918 in 2025), US $395 ($1399 in 2025)

Technical specifications
- Polyphony: monophonic
- Timbrality: multitimbral
- Oscillator: Sawtooth and square wave
- LFO: none
- Synthesis type: Analog subtractive
- Filter: 24 dB/oct low-pass resonant filter, non-self-oscillating
- Aftertouch expression: No
- Velocity expression: No
- Storage memory: 64 patterns, 7 songs, 1 track
- Effects: No internal effects.

Input/output
- Keyboard: 16 pattern keys

The Roland TB-303 Bass Line (also known as the 303) is a bass synthesizer released by Roland Corporation in 1981. Designed to simulate bass guitars, it was a commercial failure and was discontinued in 1984. However, cheap second-hand units were adopted by electronic musicians, and it became a foundation of electronic dance music genres such as acid house, Chicago house and techno. It has inspired numerous clones.

== Design and features ==
Example sounds produced by the 303

The 303 was manufactured by the Japanese company Roland. It was designed by Tadao Kikumoto, who also designed the Roland TR-909 drum machine. It was marketed as a "computerised bass machine" to replace the bass guitar.

The 303 can produce a sawtooth wave or a square wave. This is fed into a 24 dB/octave low-pass filter, which is manipulated by an envelope generator. Notes are programmed using the internal sequencer. MusicRadar described its sound as "squelchy".

== Release ==
The 303 was released in 1981 and retailed for US$395 (equivalent to $1,399 in 2025) or £234 (equivalent to £902 in 2025). In the US, Roland did not supply an English-language instruction manual, which made learning to program it difficult. The 303's unrealistic sound made it unpopular with its target audience, musicians who wanted to replace bass guitars. It was discontinued in 1984.

== Legacy ==
The Indian musician Charanjit Singh's 1982 album Synthesizing: Ten Ragas to a Disco Beat features an early use of a 303, alongside the TR-808 drum machine. It remained obscure until the early 21st century, when it was reissued and recognized as a precursor to acid house. The Bollywood music producer Bappi Lahiri used the 303 for several film songs released in 1983: "Koi Lutera" in Wanted: Dead or Alive, "Aah Ha Oonh Hun" in Do Gulaab, and "Tum Tum Tumba" in Karate.

"Rip It Up" (1983) by the Scottish band Orange Juice was the first song featuring the 303 to enter the top ten of the UK singles chart. That year, the Japanese musician Ryo Kawasaki used the 303 with a TR-808 and synth guitar in his electronic jazz album Lucky Lady (1983).

In the 1980s, the Chicago group Phuture bought a cheap 303 and began experimenting. By manipulating the synthesizer as it played, they created a unique "squelching, resonant and liquid sound". This became the foundation of the single "Acid Tracks" (1987), often credited as the first acid house track. With the 303's "squelchy bass loops" as a staple sound, acid house became popular worldwide, particularly as part of the UK's emerging rave culture known as the second summer of love.

In the late 1980s and early 1990s, as new acid styles emerged, the 303 was often overdriven, producing a harsher sound, such as on Hardfloor's 1992 EP "Acperience" and Interlect 3000's 1993 EP "Volcano". In 1995, the 303 was distorted and processed on Josh Wink's hit "Higher State of Consciousness" and on Daft Punk's "Da Funk". The English producer Fatboy Slim admired the simplicity of the controls, and named his first single "Everybody Needs a 303" (1996).

In 2011, the Guardian named the release of the 303 one of the 50 key events in the history of dance music. The popularity of acid caused a dramatic increase in the price of used 303 units. As of 2014, units sold for over £1,200.

== Successors ==
The 303 has inspired numerous software emulations and clones, such as the TD-3 by Behringer, released in 2019. In 2014, Roland released the TB-3 Touch Bassline, with a touchpad interface and MIDI and USB connections. In 2017, Roland released the TB-03, a miniaturized model featuring an LED display and delay and overdrive effects.
