= Acid house =

Subgenre of house music

- The smiley face was widely adopted as a symbol of the genre in the 1980s and 1990s
- Stylistic origins: Chicago house; hi-NRG; psychedelia
- Cultural origins: 1985, Chicago, U.S.
- Derivative forms: New beat; acid techno; acid trance; Goa trance; psychedelic trance; breakbeat hardcore; big beat; trance; electro house; techno; acid jazz; ambient house

Other topics
- Rave

Acid house (also simply known as just "acid") is a subgenre of house music developed around the mid-1980s by DJs from Chicago. The style is defined primarily by the squelching sounds and basslines of the Roland TB-303 electronic bass synthesizer-sequencer, an innovation attributed to Chicago artists Phuture and Sleezy D circa 1986.

Acid house soon became popular in the United Kingdom and continental Europe, where it was played by DJs in the acid house and later rave scenes. By the late 1980s, acid house had moved into the British mainstream, where it had some influence on pop and dance styles.

Acid house brought house music to a worldwide audience. The influence of acid house can be heard in later styles of dance music including trance, hardcore, jungle, big beat, techno and trip hop.

== Characteristics ==
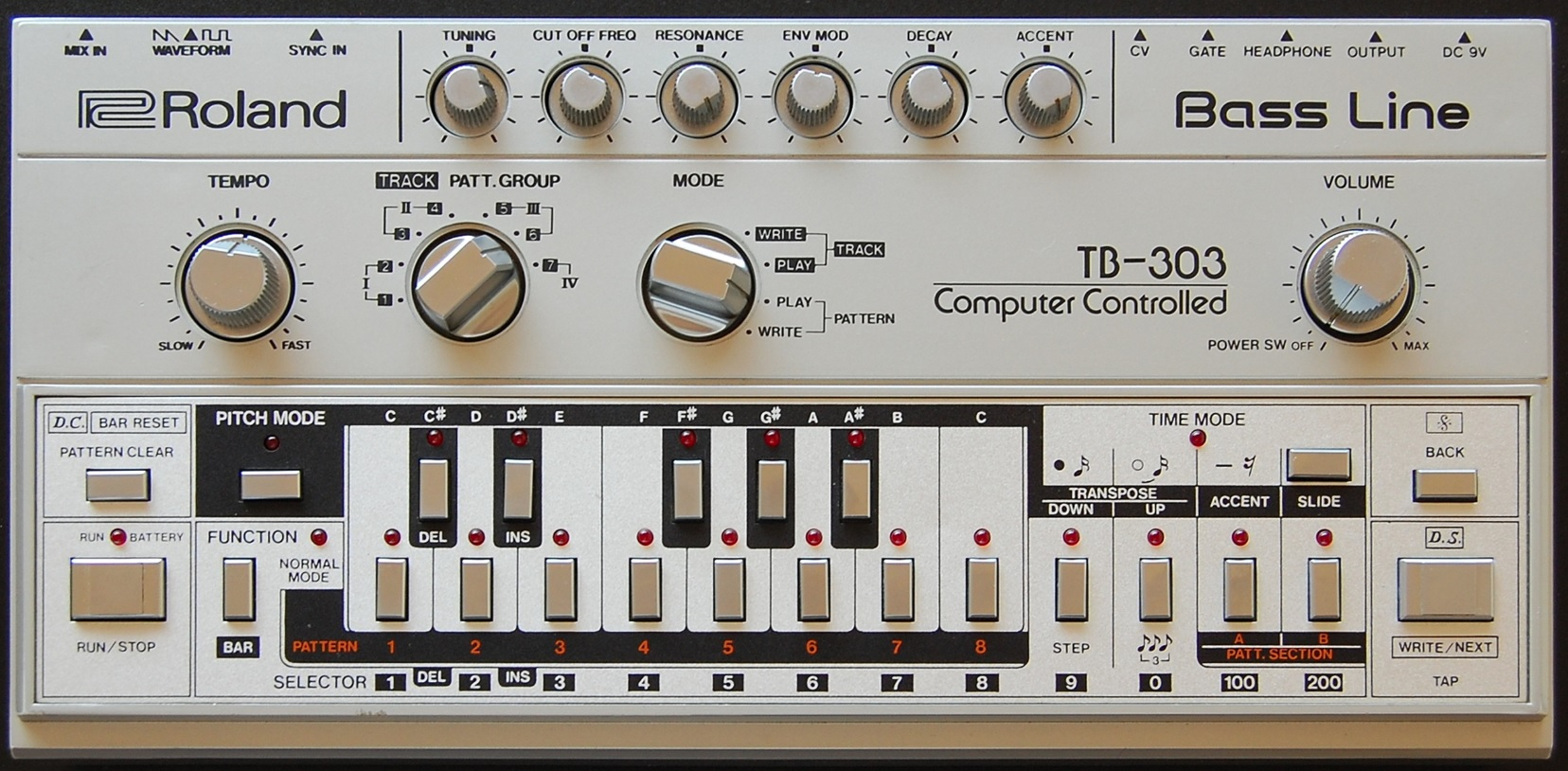
The Roland TB-303 bass synthesizer provided the electronic squelch sounds often heard in acid house tracks.

Acid house's minimalist sound combined house music's ubiquitous programmed four-on-the-floor 4/4 beat with the electronic squelch sound produced by the Roland TB-303 electronic synthesizer-sequencer. The sound is commonly produced by raising the filter resonance and lowering the cutoff frequency of the synthesizer, along with programming the 303's accent, slide, and octave parameters, to create variation in otherwise simple bass patterns. "Exploration of texture" is preferred over melody; "a refusal of the metaphysical priorities of western music discourse". Other elements, such as synthetic strings and stabs, were usually minimal. Sometimes tracks were instrumentals, such as Phuture's "Acid Tracks", or contained full vocal performances, such as DJ Pierre's Pfantasy Club's "Fantasy Girl", while others were essentially instrumentals complemented by the odd spoken word "drop-in", such as Phuture's "Slam".

== Etymology ==
Two simple TB-303 patterns
Two simple patterns on a synthesizer similar to the Roland TB-303 bass synthesizer. This is not the sound of an actual TB-303. The second pattern has had the filter EG attack time altered. Note that the TB-303 does not have an adjustment for envelope attack time, and envelopes aside, the real 303 creates an otherwise notably different sound to this one.

Overdriven TB-303 patterns varying resonance
Two simple overdriven patterns on the same synthesizer as in the previous clip. The second pattern has varying resonance to give a harsh screeching sound. Both patterns have gradual changes in cutoff frequency.

There are conflicting accounts about the origin of the term acid. One self-claimed account by members of Phuture points to their own "Acid Tracks". Before the song was given a title for commercial release, it was played by DJ Ron Hardy at a nightclub where psychedelic drugs were reportedly used. The club's patrons called the song "Ron Hardy's Acid Track" (or "Ron Hardy's Acid Trax"). The song was released with the title "Acid Tracks" on Larry Sherman's label Trax Records in 1987. Sources differ on whether it was Phuture or Sherman who chose the title; Phuture's DJ Pierre says the group did because the song was already known by that title, but DJ Pierre says he chose the title because the song reminded him of acid rock. Regardless, after the release of Phuture's song, the term acid house came into common parlance.

Some accounts say the reference to "acid" may be a celebratory reference to psychedelic drugs in general, such as LSD, as well as the popular club drug Ecstasy (MDMA). According to Professor Hillegonda Rietveld, a researcher specializing in electronic dance music, it was the house sensibility of Chicago, in a club like Hardy's The Music Box, that afforded it its initial meaning. In her view "acid connotes the fragmentation of experience and dislocation of meaning due to the unstructuring effects on thought patterns which the psychedelic drug LSD or 'Acid' can bring about". In the context of the creation of "Acid Tracks" it indicated a concept rather than the use of psychedelic drugs in itself.

Some accounts disavow psychedelic connotations. One theory, holding that acid was a derogatory reference towards the use of samples in acid house music, was repeated in the press and in the British House of Commons. In this theory, the term acid came from the slang term "acid burning", which the Oxford Dictionary of New Words calls "a term for stealing". In 1991, UK Libertarian advocate Paul Staines claimed that he had coined this theory to discourage the government from adopting anti-rave party legislation.

The name of acid jazz is derived from that of acid house, which served as one of the inspirations for the genre's development.

== History ==
=== Origins ===
Before the term "acid house" was introduced, rawer early acid house was "hi-NRG", a type of bassline-driven electronic music that began with disco music that discarded its funk element, starting with Giorgio Moroder productions for Donna Summer. However, the earliest recorded examples of acid house are a matter of debate.

Sleezy D's "I've Lost Control" (1986) was the first to be released on vinyl, but it is impossible to know which track was created first.

In the 21st century, attention was drawn to Charanjit Singh's album Synthesizing: Ten Ragas to a Disco Beat (1982), featuring Indian ragas fused with disco. The album released as early as 1982, featured a TB-303 prominently, Singh being one of the earliest musicians to use it on a commercial release. The record predates the famously known "Acid Trax" by 5 years. It was initially a commercial failure in India and eventually forgotten. Following its rediscovery and eventual re-release in early 2010 some music journalists compared the music to that of acid house music, even suggesting it might be the first example of the style. Suns of Arqa's Ark of the Arqans (1985) proved an influence on early acid house.

=== Chicago movement (mid-1980s–late 1980s) ===
The first acid house records were produced in Chicago, Illinois. Phuture, a group founded by Nathan "DJ Pierre" Jones, Earl "Spanky" Smith Jr., and Herbert "Herb J" Jackson, is credited with having been the first to use the TB-303 in house music (the instrument had been used earlier in disco records by the earlier mentioned Charanjit Singh in 1982, in hi-NRG, Alexander Robotnick in 1983). The group's 12-minute "Acid Tracks" was recorded to tape and was played by DJ Ron Hardy at the Music Box, where Hardy was resident DJ. Hardy once played it four times over the course of an evening until the crowd responded favorably.

Chicago's house music scene suffered a crackdown on parties and events by the police. Sales of house records dwindled and, by 1988, the genre was selling less than a tenth as many records as at the height of the style's popularity. However, house and especially acid house was beginning to experience a surge in popularity in Britain.

=== UK house scene (late 1980s–1990s) ===
==== London ====
London's club Shoom opened in November 1987 and was one of the first clubs to introduce acid house to the clubbing public of the UK. It was opened by Danny Rampling and his wife, Jenny. The club was extremely exclusive and featured thick fog, a dreamy atmosphere and acid house. This period began what some call the Second Summer of Love, a movement credited with a reduction in football hooliganism: instead of fights, football fans were listening to music, taking ecstasy, and joining the other club attendees in a peaceful movement that has been compared to the Summer of Love in San Francisco in 1967.

Another club called Trip was opened in June 1988 by Nicky Holloway at the Astoria in London's West End. Trip was geared directly towards the acid house music scene. It was known for its intensity and stayed open until 3 AM. The patrons would spill into the streets chanting and drew the police on regular occasions. The reputation that occurrences like this created along with the UK's strong anti-club laws started to make it increasingly difficult to offer events in the conventional club atmosphere. Considered illegal in London during the late '80s, after-hour clubbing was against the law. However, this did not stop the club-goers from continuing after-hours dancing. Police raided the after-hour parties, so the groups began to assemble inside warehouses and other inconspicuous venues in secret, hence also marking the first developments of the rave. Raves were well attended at this time and consisted of single events or moving series of parties thrown by production companies or unlicensed clubs. Two well-known groups at this point were Sunrise, who held particularly massive outdoor events, and Revolution in Progress (RIP), known for the dark atmosphere and hard music at events which were usually thrown in warehouses or at Clink Street, a South East London nightclub housed in a former jail. Promoters like (The Big Lad) Shane McKenzie and the gang back in 1987 were doing small parties in NW London, moving raves from the streets and the fields to the clubs of London 1990–2005 which saw the future of raves in clubs all over the UK and Spain.

The Sunrise group threw several large acid house raves in Britain which gathered serious press attention. In 1988 they threw "Burn It Up", 1989 brought "Early Summer Madness", "Midsummer Night's Dream" and "Back to the Future". They advertised huge sound systems, fairground rides, foreign DJs, and other attractions. Many articles were written sensationalizing these parties and the results of them, focusing especially on the drug use and out-of-control nature that the media perceived.

Once the term acid house became more widely used, participants at acid house-themed events in the UK and Ibiza made the psychedelic drug connotations a reality by using club drugs such as ecstasy and LSD. The association of acid house, MDMA, and smiley faces was observed in New York City by late 1988. This coincided with an increasing level of scrutiny and sensationalism in the mainstream press, although conflicting accounts about the degree of connection between acid house music and drugs continued to surface.

==== Manchester and 'Madchester' ====
The "Madchester" wordtype which appeared on the Happy Mondays' 1989 EP Madchester Rave On. It was later used to represent the entire Madchester movement

Acid house was also popular in Manchester. The Thunderdome (which was generally advertised as a techno night) in Miles Platting was at the epicenter of the scene and gave rise to acts like A Guy Called Gerald, 808 State, Jam MC's, Steve Williams and Jay Wearden. A Greater Manchester-based producer called Peter Ford teamed up with Richard Salt and recorded a record called "Oochy Koochy", regarded as the first British acid house track. Released by dance indie Rhythm King Records as "Oochy Koochy (FU Baby Yeah Yeah)" under the name Baby Ford, the record peaked at number 58 on the UK Singles Chart on September 24, 1988, and was followed by Baby Ford's "Chikki Chikki Ahh Ahh" hit.

The genre was extremely popular with the city's football hooligans. According to Manchester United football hooligan Colin Blaney in Hotshot: The Story of a Little Red Devil, the acid house venues were the only place where rival hooligan gangs would mix, without coming to blows with one another. According to Blaney, music journalist Simon Reynolds and others, ecstasy was instrumental in mellowing and bringing together rival hooligans.

The Madchester and baggy movements saw acid house influences bleed into the Mancunian rock scene. Prominent Madchester bands include the Stone Roses, Happy Mondays, the Charlatans and Inspiral Carpets.

==== Media attention ====
In the late 1980s and early 1990s, British news media and tabloids devoted an increasing amount of coverage to the hedonistic acid house/rave scene, focusing increasingly on its association with psychedelic drugs and club drugs. At first, promoters like Tony Colston-Hayter tried to monetize the scene by promoting his Apocalypse Now parties (organised with Roger Goodman) on the ITV News (ITN) in the same way that a latter-day popstar such as Gary Barlow would promote his album on the news (generally in the "...And Finally" part of the programme).

However, these reports soon changed from positive promotion to a negative viewpoint, with the sensationalist nature of the coverage contributing to the banning of acid house during its heyday from radio, television, and retail outlets in the United Kingdom. The moral panic of the press began in late 1988, when a UK 'red-top' tabloid called The Sun, which only days earlier on October 12 had promoted acid house as "cool and groovy" while running an offer on acid smiley face t-shirts, abruptly turned on the scene. On October 19, The Sun ran with the headline "Evils of Ecstasy", linking the acid house scene with the newly popular and relatively unknown drug. The resultant panic incited by the tabloids eventually led to a crackdown on clubs and venues that played acid house and had a profound negative impact on the scene. Any records that mentioned the word acid, such as Dancin' Danny D's record with scene promoter Gary Haisman (D Mob's "We Call It Acieed"), were taken off radio and television playlists just as they were climbing towards the top of the UK chart. By the time Colston-Hayter had invited another ITV news team down to promote his latest party (this time from Granada's current affairs show World in Action), acid house was being described as a "sinister and evil cult" that was just encouraging people to take drugs.

Despite this, one tune broke through into the mainstream in November 1988. "Stakker Humanoid", produced by Brian Dougans (later of Future Sound of London), was a hit not just at influential clubs like The Haçienda in Manchester or Shoom in London, but was championed by mainstream stalwarts such as BBC Radio DJ Bruno Brookes and record producer, Pete Waterman. It went on to reach number 17 in the UK in November 1988, leading to Dougans' appearance on Top of the Pops on December 1, 1988.

== See also ==
- Category:Acid house musicians
- Acid house party
- Balearic beat
