= Adonis (musician) =

Pioneering American acid house musician (born 1963)

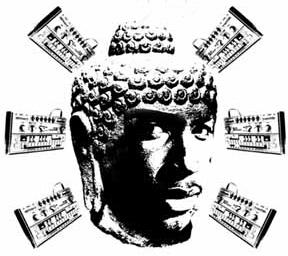

Background information
- Birth name: Michael A. Smith
- Also known as: Jack Frost, Acid Budda, Gentry Ice, The Endless Poker, Percy Richblood
- Born: January 4, 1963 (age 62)
- Origin: Chicago, Illinois, United States
- Genres: House; acid house
- Occupations: musician; producer; songwriter; DJ
- Years active: 1983–present
- Labels: D.J. International Records; Adonis Recordings
- Formerly of: Clockwork

Adonis (born Michael A. Smith, current legal name Adonis M. Smith; January 4, 1963) is a pioneering American acid house musician. Adonis is best known for his early Chicago house tracks "No Way Back" and "We're Rockin Down the House".

== Musical career ==
Born and raised on the West Side of Chicago, Adonis was introduced to music at a young age. He studied contemporary jazz at the American Conservatory of Music. Later on, he played bass guitar in several R&B bands and was eventually introduced to the house scene in Chicago through hearing Jesse Saunders' "On and On".

As Michael A. Smith, he was a member of the band Clockwork. They recorded "I'm Your Candy Girl" (1984), a post-disco boogie song.

In 1986, Adonis released "No Way Back", which is considered to be one of the most influential Chicago house tracks. The single, by estimate, sold over 100,000 copies and was selected as number 14 by on the 2014 Rolling Stone list of the 20 best Chicago house records.

== Partial discography ==
As Adonis

- "No Way Back" (single) (1987, Adonis Recordings)
- "We're Rocking Down the House" (single) (1987, Adonis Recordings)
- "Acid Poke" (single) (1988, Desire Records)
- "H.O.U.S.E." (featuring M. C. Kodak) (single) (1988, Black Market Records)
- "Do You Wanna Jack" (as Gentry Ice) b/w "Lost in the Sound" (single) (1989, Jack Trax)

With The Endless Poker's

- "! The Poke !" (single) (1987, D.J. International Records)

With Clockwork

- "I'm Your Candy Girl" (single) (1984, Private I Records)
- "Night Life" (single) (1985, The Network)
- "Feela-La-La" (single) (1987, City Street Records)

With Jack Frost & The Circle Jerks

- "Two The Max" lp (1988, Adonis Recordings)
