= Phuture =

American house music group

- Also known as: Phortune
- Origin: Chicago, Illinois, U.S.
- Genres: Acid house; deep house; house
- Years active: 1985–present
- Labels: Trax; Music Man; Strictly Rhythm; A1
- Members: Lothario "Rio" Lee; Fernando "Fher" Rivera; DJ Pierre

Phuture is an American house music group from Chicago, founded in 1985 by Earl "Spanky" Smith Jr., Nathaniel Pierre Jones a.k.a. DJ Pierre, and Herbert "Herb J" Jackson. The group is renowned for inventing and defining the sound of acid house, a subgenre of house music, with their 1987 release "Acid Tracks".

== History and background ==
Phuture's seminal "Acid Tracks" is considered to be the first acid house record and credited for inventing and defining the genre. The 12-minute instrumental composition was released on Trax Records in 1987. Originally, it was recorded to tape and played by DJ Ron Hardy at the Chicago nightclub Music Box, supposedly already in 1985. Its characteristic "acid" sound was derived from utilizing the Roland TB-303 bass synthesizer in a very particular way, using tone sequences modulated in real-time to produce a certain resonant and squelchy sound which is since then associated with the genre. The track also utilized Roland TR-707 and Roland TR-727 drum machines.

After "Acid Tracks", Phuture released a number of acid house and Chicago house tracks now considered classics of the genre, usually as 12-inch vinyl maxi singles. Their sound is gloomy and monotonous in nature; many tracks are very long, at times passing the 10-minute mark. The sparse lyrics occasionally reference drug use, such as the lyrics of "Your Only Friend" (1987), which describe cocaine addiction, or a simple chant, such as on "Spirit" (1994). The group has recorded under several pseudonyms, generally using the substitution of ph or pf for f, as, for example, in Phortune or Pfortune.

== Members ==
=== Current members ===
- Lothario "Rio" Lee
- Nathaniel Pierre Jones a.k.a. DJ Pierre (1985–1990; 2013–present)
- Fernando "Fher" Rivera a.k.a. Lessnoise

=== Former members ===
- Herb J (Herbert Jackson) (1985–1988)
- Jay Juniel (1990)
- Phill Little (1990)
- Roy Davis Jr. (1990–1997)
- DJ Skull (Ron Maney) (1996–1997)
- Earl Smith Jr. a.k.a. Spanky, DJ Spank Spank, or DeeJay Phuture (1985–2016)

== Discography ==
=== Singles and maxi-singles ===
- "Acid Tracks" (1987)
- "The Creator" (1988)
- "We are Phuture" (1988)
- "Do You Wanna Get Funky" (1989)
- "Rise from Your Grave" (1992)
- "Inside Out" (1993)
- "Mental Breakdown" (1994)
- "Spirit" (1994)
- "Acid Trax / String Free" (Phuture/Phortune) (1994)
- "Times Fade" (Phuture, the Next Generation) (1996)
- "Jack 2 Jack" (Robert Owens/Phuture) (1998)
- "Washing Machine / Got The Bug" (Mr. Fingers/Phuture) (2002)

=== Remixes ===
- Roy Davis Jr.: Heart Attack (Phuture’s Mix) (1994)
