= Marshall Jefferson =

American record producer and DJ

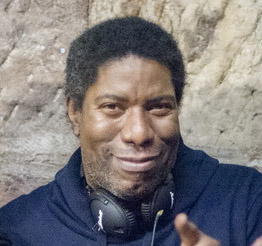
- Jefferson in 2013

Background information
- Born: Marshall Julius Jefferson; September 19, 1959 (age 67); Chicago, Illinois, U.S.
- Genres: House; Chicago house; deep house
- Occupation: Musician
- Member of: Ten City

Marshall Julius Jefferson (born September 19, 1959) is an American musician, working in the house music subgenres of Chicago house and deep house.

== Biography ==
Sometimes known as the father of house music, Jefferson was originally a record producer in the Universal Recording Studios in Chicago, where he met the owner of Trax Records, Larry Sherman. Jefferson's 1986 single for Trax, "Move Your Body", the first house song to use piano, was a popular and influential song in the genre. During the late-1980s heyday of house music, he recorded solo and collaborative material under various names such as Virgo, Jungle Wonz, Truth, and On the House. Jefferson's deep house productions include songs by CeCe Rogers and Sterling Void, and Ten City's first two albums. In March 1987, the British music magazine NME reported that Jefferson and Frankie Knuckles were in the UK for the first house-music tour.

"Move Your Body" appeared in the video game Grand Theft Auto: San Andreas, playing on house-music radio station SF-UR. This song also appeared in Michael Winterbottom's film 24 Hour Party People and in the 1991 documentary film Paris Is Burning.

Jefferson took a break from music in 1990, then returned to DJing in 1993. He moved to Billericay in Essex where he had a five-year residency with the Tribal Gathering and Big Love events.

Jefferson now lives in Manchester, England and released a remixed version of "Move Your Body" (credited to Marshall Jefferson x Solardo, with the latter being a Mancunian production duo made up of Mark Richards and James Eliot) in 2019. The remix was certified Silver by the British Phonographic Industry (BPI) in 2023.

In 2021, he teamed up again with Byron Stingily to release "Be Free", the first single in 25 years to be credited to Stingily's house music group Ten City.

Jefferson is featured in Episode 3 of the 2024 PBS series Disco: Soundtrack of a Revolution.
