= Wololo =

2016 song by Babes Wodumo

Single by Babes Wodumo featuring Mampintsha

from the album Gqom Queen, Vol. 1
- Language: Zulu language
- Released: 26 April 2016
- Recorded: 2016
- Genre: Gqom
- Length: 6:30
- Label: West Ink
- Songwriter: Busesikile Simelane
- Producer: Distruction Boyz

Babes Wodumo singles chronology
"Shut Up & Groove" (2016)	"Wololo" (2016)	"Wololo (Remix)" (2017)

Music video
- "Wololo (Official music video)" on YouTube

Official audio
- "Wololo" on YouTube

"Wololo" is the lead single by South African singer-songwriter and choreographer Babes Wodumo from her debut studio album Gqom Queen, Vol. 1 (2016). It was released on 26 April 2016 through West Ink Records and features a guest appearance from Mampintsha with production handled by Distruction Boyz.

The song received major recognition nationally, featured in Black Panther (2018), and was utmost nominated for multiple awards.

== Music video ==
The music video to "Wololo" was published YouTube on 24 June 2016. Directed by Pilot Films, it stars Babes Wodumo dancing at a party with Mampintsha, and Distruction Boyz behind the DJ decks, as it features cameo appearances from DJ Tira and Nay Maps. After surpassing 2.3 million views in 3 months, the music video was taken down for copyright infringement, and was later reinstated by the same company that had it removed after they were attacked by the public on social media. As of October 2023, the music video sits on 13.8 million views.

== Awards and nominations ==
Year	Award ceremony	Category	Recipient/Nominated work	Results	Ref.
2016	MTV Africa Music Awards	Song of the Year	"Wololo"	Nominated	
2017	Metro FM Music Awards	Song of the Year	"Wololo"	Nominated	
2017	South African Music Awards	Record of the Year	"Wololo"	Nominated	
2017	South African Music Awards	Remix of the Year	"Wololo (Remix)"	Nominated	
