= Black Panther (soundtrack) =

2018 soundtrack album by Kendrick Lamar and score by Ludwig Göransson

Black Panther: The Album

Soundtrack album by Kendrick Lamar and various artists
- Released: February 9, 2018
- Recorded: 2017
- Studio: Various: Windmark; No Excuses; Groovy Sounds; Ruff; Deuce Station; EastWest; The Grill; Conway; 5Star; West Ink; Empire; Low Key; Electric Lady; HOB
- Genres: Hip-hop; gqom; trap; R&B; ATM; pop rap
- Length: 49:19
- Labels: TDE; Aftermath; Interscope
- Producers: Kendrick Lamar; 30 Roc; Al Shux; Axelfolie; Baby Keem; BadBadNotGood; Cardo; Cubeatz; DJ Dahi; Doc McKinney; Frank Dukes; Illmind; Kurtis McKenzie; Ludwig Göransson; Matt Schaeffer; Mike Will Made It; Robin Hannibal; Rascal; Scribz Riley; Sounwave; Teddy Walton; Twon Beatz

Kendrick Lamar chronology
Damn (2017)	Black Panther: The Album (2018)	Mr. Morale & the Big Steppers (2022)

Singles from Black Panther: The Album
- 1. "All the Stars" Released: January 5, 2018; 2. "King's Dead" Released: January 11, 2018; 3. "Pray for Me" Released: February 2, 2018

Black Panther (Original Score)

Film score by Ludwig Göransson
- Released: February 16, 2018
- Recorded: October–November 2017
- Studios: Abbey Road Studios, London
- Genres: Orchestra; Traditional African
- Length: 95:07
- Labels: Hollywood; Marvel Music
- Producer: Ludwig Göransson

Ludwig Göransson chronology
Hasan Minhaj: Homecoming King (2017)	Black Panther (Original Score) (2018)	Death Wish (2018)

The soundtrack for the 2018 American superhero film Black Panther, based on the Marvel Comics character of the same name and produced by Marvel Studios, consists of an original score composed by Ludwig Göransson and original songs performed or curated by Kendrick Lamar. Göransson worked on all of director Ryan Coogler's previous films, while Lamar and Coogler had previously discussed collaborating and the musician agreed to perform several songs for the film after seeing an early version of it.

After reading the film's script, Göransson traveled to Africa to research traditional African music for the film. He went on tour with Senegalese musician Baaba Maal, and recorded performances by Maal and other African musicians for use in the score. Notably, Göransson used recordings of talking drums and a tambin for character themes in the film, while Maal sung an original song for the opening of the score. Göransson combined these traditional African elements with the classical orchestra that is often used in superhero films. The orchestra was recorded at Abbey Road Studios, along with a choir singing in the Xhosa language.

Wanting to match the film in terms of addressing important themes, Lamar decided to produce a full curated soundtrack album rather than just the few songs requested by Coogler. Because of the film's set release schedule, Lamar had less time to work on the album than he usually would. He began work with producer Sounwave while on tour, before completing the individual songs in collaboration with many different artists. One of these collaborators was Göransson, who worked on one of the songs and included elements from the album in the score. Coogler felt the album became its own piece of art rather than just a tie-in to the film.

Lamar's soundtrack was released as Black Panther: The Album by Interscope Records on February 9, 2018, to large sales, including the top position on the Billboard 200 chart. It was praised by many critics as a milestone for film soundtracks due to its ideas and lyrics, but it was considered by some to be weaker than Lamar's solo work. Göransson's score was released as Black Panther (Original Score) by Hollywood Records on February 16, and received praise for being unique among Marvel Cinematic Universe scores due to its authentic African elements and thematic material, though the album presentation was criticized as being too long. It won Best Original Score awards at the Academy Awards and the Grammy Awards, while the song "King's Dead" from Lamar's album also won a Grammy.

== Background ==
Ryan Coogler signed on to direct the film Black Panther for Marvel Studios in January 2016, and insisted that he bring collaborators from his previous films to work on Black Panther, to differentiate the film from others in the Marvel Cinematic Universe that Vulture's Kyle Buchanan described as often being created by "the same in-house people." This included composer Ludwig Göransson, who began working with Coogler at the University of Southern California and scored his earlier films Fruitvale Station and Creed.

Coogler had previously met with musician Kendrick Lamar and Anthony Tiffith of Top Dawg Entertainment to discuss each other's work and the potential for them to collaborate on a project. Coogler wanted Black Panther to include some original songs from Lamar, an idea that Marvel supported, and approached the musician with footage from the film after Lamar had completed work on his album Damn Lamar and producer Sounwave were "drawn in by the opening scene and the deep message this movie told." They wanted to match the film's "energy and raw emotions," but felt this would be difficult with the few songs Coogler requested and instead decided to create a full album. The soundtrack features songs that are heard in the film as well as others that are inspired by it.

== Original score ==
=== Research ===
As with his previous collaborations with Coogler, Göransson began work on the Black Panther score as early as possible, much earlier than any other composer on a Marvel Studios film according to producer Nate Moore. Göransson began discussing the film with Coogler immediately, and the director shared research he did in Africa while preparing for the film; Göransson read the first draft of the script as soon as Coogler was happy with it, and read comics from Ta-Nehisi Coates' run on Black Panther, which had just begun. Göransson acknowledged that he is an unlikely candidate to write African music given he is Swedish, and decided that he needed to go to Africa himself to do his own research. He noted that the fictional setting of the film, Wakanda, was never colonized and so the music found there would not have been influenced by Christian music. Coogler also wanted to use authentic African sounds, a first for a superhero film, and trusted Göransson to balance this with the "anthemic" quality of a traditional superhero score.

Göransson spent a month in Senegal, first travelling around with musician Baaba Maal for a week while he was on tour, and then spending several weeks working with local musicians to form the "base" of his score. After Senegal, Göransson went to South Africa and spent a week at the International Library of African Music in Grahamstown listening to thousands of recordings of music from different African tribes, and recording music on hundreds of instruments that "don't really exist anymore." He said, "To be able to go there, record the instruments and use them in the movie ... it was an incredible opportunity." Göransson then returned to Los Angeles where he planned to combine the African music he had discovered with his usual orchestral and modern production techniques to create the final score. He said it would be a challenge to do this while still having the music "feel African," and had to approach the score as infusing an orchestra, played in the tradition of African instruments, into actual African music.

=== Composition ===
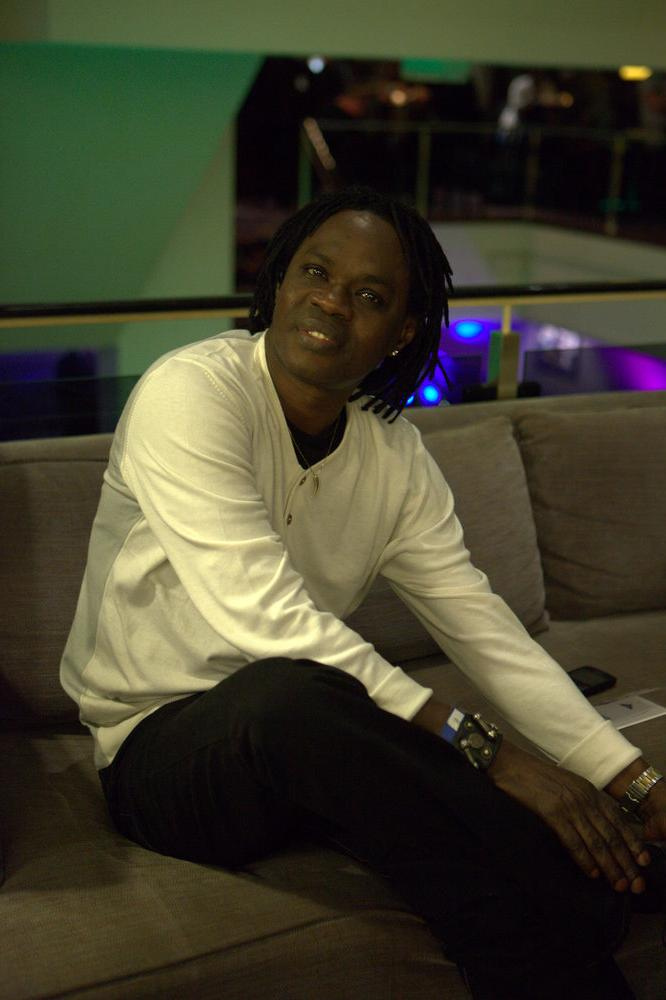
Senegalese musician Baaba Maal aided composer Ludwig Göransson with his research for the score, and provided his voice for it.

Göransson had initially approached the score with the idea that music in Wakanda could be anything due to its being a fictional country, but discovered that "music from Africa is a language" used for storytelling, with every instrument and different musical rhythm given meaning, and wanted to ensure that this was reflected since the country is still clearly in Africa. He wanted to specifically acknowledge existing African music that applied directly to scenes in the film, such as using rhythms that were created thousands of years prior to represent large battles during the big fight sequences in the film. Another example of this is the challenge scenes in the film, which include traditional challenge rhythms performed on a sabar drum by soloist Magatte Sow, along with "additional color" from a kora and a vuvuzela (an instrument often heard at sporting events).

In Senegal, Göransson was particularly drawn to the talking drum as a form of communication in addition to being a musical instrument. This became the first sound he used in the score to represent T'Challa / Black Panther, and he described it as "the first seed of how the instrumentation affected the process." T'Challa's theme consists of six talking drums being played together, with a solo talking drum performance by soloist Massamba Diop layered over those. These were combined with the sound of a talking drum mimicking the word "T'Challa" and a beat from a Roland TR-808 drum machine to "beef it up." Göransson used the base talking drum rhythm, 808 rhythm, solo talking drum, and "T'Challa" talking drum motif as the primary rhythm for T'Challa in the score. On top of this rhythm, Coogler and Göransson chose to use horns to make the character's theme sound more royal, with Göransson writing music for the horns that he felt was more rhythmic than melodic and allowed them to be interpreted as coming from the rhythm of the talking drums rather than a traditional western theme with drums in the background. Göransson did write a specific six-note melody for T'Challa, also played on the brass, which serves as the final piece of the character's main theme and also is used as a main theme for the film during scene transitions and for driving the overall story forward.

After hearing a musician in Senegal named Amadou Ba playing a tambin, or Fula flute, Göransson told him the backstory of villain Killmonger in the film and Ba played some music in response to the story. Göransson felt this music fit the character well, and it became the first element of Killmonger's theme for the film. Ba's performance revolved around a root note that Göransson gave him, and included singing, screaming, and laughing into the flute as he played it, with one of the words screamed being "Killmonger". Göransson described the performance as "sad but also aggressive, energetic and impulsive." The composer sent his recordings of the Fula flute to actor Michael B. Jordan to help him prepare for portraying Killmonger in the film. The Fula flute is used as a sample piece earlier in the film, but transitions to full performances of the flute as Killmonger takes over Wakanda, and represents the character's Wakandan origin and aspirations. It is paired with a piano melody for Killmonger that is mysterious at first, and accompanied by a harp to represent the character's intelligence. The piano then transitions to strings to show the suffering the character has endured, inspired by the works of Johann Sebastian Bach. Göransson also chose to use more modern production techniques, such as the 808 beats, for Killmonger's music than the rest of the score, with a "trap beat vibe," because the character is American and represents modernity in the film. Göransson used his experience with African-American music such as hip hop and rapping—which he gained as a producer for Donald Glover's "Childish Gambino" work—when developing the more modern elements of Killmonger's theme, and noted that these elements were similar in sound to the traditional African drums in the score, allowing him to move between the sounds of Killmonger and Wakanda in the final battle scene without taking the audience out of the film. The final element of the character's theme is a four-note "punctuation" with brass and choir that adds mystery and drama.

For the introduction to Wakanda in the film, Göransson was inspired by a "ceremonial outcall" that Maal began each of his shows on tour with. The composer collaborated with Maal on a song in this style which features the latter singing about the death of an elephant in the Fula language, symbolizing the death of T'Challa's father T'Chaka. When T'Challa visits the spirit of his father in the valley of the dead, Göransson felt the dialogue was so emotional that the instrumentation should be changed to reflect that, and so opted to focus on strings rather than percussion. This "ancestral theme" also serves as a theme for the relationship between T'Challa and Killmonger, with a broken down, "tiny piece" of the string motif heard in Killmonger's theme to show that "it's all related in a way, just as [the characters] are related by blood"; Göransson actually developed this familial theme for all the characters from the Killmonger flute motif, using part of the music originated by Ba. For T'Challa, it is played longer and with a full orchestra, and indicates that he is "trying to find his way in life." Other themes composed for the film include one for T'Challa's sister Shuri, which was played on a balafon, and one for the Dora Milaje warriors, consisting of a group of Senegalese women 'yipping' which Coogler described as a "chu chu" sound. The latter was supported by a female choir from London.

=== Recording ===
Because Coogler does not use a temp score (placeholder music included for editing purposes) for his films, Göransson began work without specific references for each scene. He had enough material by the time Coogler put together his initial four-hour cut of the film that he was able to fully score the cut. Göransson recorded many different elements of the score at Baal's studio in Senegal, including Baal himself for his part in the "Wakanda" song. The composer then recorded the rest of his score with a 92-piece Western classical orchestra and a 40-person choir in London at Abbey Road Studios for two weeks during October and November 2017. Göransson and John Ashton Thomas conducted the orchestra. The orchestral music was sometimes used as counterpoint to Göransson's recordings from Senegal, and other times was made to "echo the multiple layers of rhythms" heard in those recordings. The choir sung in the Xhosa language, including passages that sound like "T'Challa" for when he arrives at the Warrior Falls arena.

Coogler concluded that Göransson "really set the table for the emotion that we were trying to get across [in the film], whether it was excitement or reflection or sadness." Moore compared the work Göransson did in defining the sound of the film to the use of music by James Gunn in the Guardians of the Galaxy films, and said that it was something that would be further expanded on in a Black Panther sequel. He noted that Göransson took Marvel outside of their comfort zone on the film, but they were willing to defer to him after all of the research he did. Several times, Marvel executives questioned whether the score was leaning too close to traditional Western music only to have Göransson explain that the music they were questioning was recorded by traditional musicians in Africa and that it had simply been coopted by Western culture from Africa. Göransson agreed that Marvel was completely supportive of his work, and said he would never have been able to make the score without first spending time in Africa. Throughout all of his work on the score, Göransson aimed to recreate the feeling he had when first listening to Maal's music in Senegal, which he described as a mesmerizing "out-of-body experience".

== Curated soundtrack ==
=== Development ===
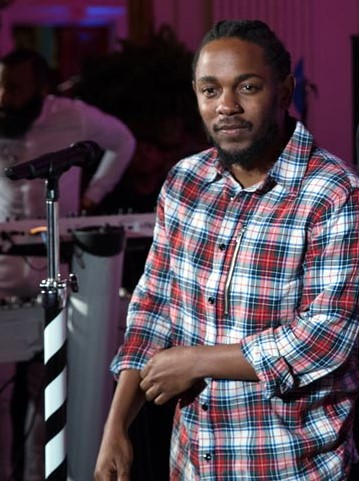
Kendrick Lamar curated the soundtrack album for Black Panther with Anthony Tiffith of Top Dawg Entertainment.

Coogler's thoughts on the soundtrack album were inspired by those created as tie-ins for 1990s films, where "artists would take themes [from the film] and make music inspired by the themes." Coogler's goal for the film was to explore "what it means to be African," and he felt that Lamar's artistic themes aligned with this goal. Sounwave praised Marvel for giving Top Dawg Entertainment creative control over the album and for Coogler's initial decision to combine the Black Panther character with Lamar's music. He said that the film is set in the modern day rather than the time the character was first introduced to comics, and "we want the whole soundtrack to sound like that too. I think it was a perfect marriage." Some of the specific moments where the final songs on the album crossover with the film include the album's eponymous track, which includes African drums and Lamar singing about the weight of being king, and the song "Seasons", which features verses sung in the Zulu language.

Sounwave explained that the album was different from the work he and Lamar usually did given they were following the story line of the film rather than creating their own. He said this allowed them to "tap into elements we normally wouldn't do." There was also a strict time limit to how long they could work on the album given the film's set release schedule, and so they began work while Lamar was on The Damn Tour in August 2017. During their time on the studio bus moving between performances, the pair would come up with "the production, the hooks and ideas" for the album. Sounwave estimated that around 80 percent of the album was completed at the end of the tour. Work on finishing the songs began the following month, with individual artists selected to collaborate on specific songs. Sounwave described these two months as the most vital during the making of the album. Some songs planned during the tour, including several that were intended to feature "big-name" artists, were ultimately not produced because they either did not fit with the overall concept of the album or could not be completed in time.

Lamar teased his involvement with the album in an easter egg in the music video for his single "Love" in late December, with a clapperboard reading "B.Panther soundtrack coming soon." After completing work on the album, Lamar praised the producers and artists who worked with him on it for allowing him to "execute a sound for the soundtrack." He added, "The concept of producing and composing a project other than my own has always been ideal," stating that he appreciated the experience. Coogler felt the album still related to the film, but had also become "more than that" and was its own piece of art that can be enjoyed separately. He noted that a lot of the artists who collaborated on the soundtrack did so without knowing what the film was, agreeing to work with Lamar rather than on a tie-in to Black Panther.

=== Collaborations ===
Coogler discussed with Lamar who he wanted to be involved with the album, with many of the names Coogler brought up being artists that Lamar had worked with or heard of before. The artists ultimately involved in the songs were chosen for their match to the different "aesthetic and vibe" that was wanted for each song, and included the majority of "top-billing names" under Top Dawg Entertainment. Coogler described the roster as "mind-blowing". A particularly important group for Coogler was SOB x RBE, who come from the San Francisco Bay Area where Coogler grew up. SOB x RBE had been approached by Lamar's manager Dave Free, and found that Lamar had extensively researched the group. Lamar had already written an introduction for their song, leaving the members of the group to write their own verses and perform them. Lamar contacted singer Khalid while he was performing with Lorde in Norway, and asked if he wanted to work on the project. The song that Khalid was chosen for, "The Ways", was written by Lamar and Swae Lee as an ode to the strong female characters in the film. Khalid called it "an acknowledgment and appreciation of how many strong women across the board—women of color, especially—are the backbone of everything ... I'm so blessed to have my own personal superhero mom who inspired me." After first meeting with Lamar, Jorja Smith was left to sing over a beat that Lamar had written with Sounwave until Lamar felt "that's it." He then worked with Smith to write "I Am" over a four-hour session.

Several artists from South Africa worked on the album, including Babes Wodumo, Sjava, Yugen Blakrok, and Saudi. Sounwave explained that he and Lamar had spent months listening to a playlist of South African music in preparation for producing the album because they wanted to "go inside their world to get an organic sound, sonically and emotionally." The pair subsequently became fans of the music. Sjava agreed to join the album because he personally wanted to work with Lamar, but also because "this is going to help inspire the nation [and] the whole continent." Saudi said that in his art, he "chose to stand for and fully represent my ethnicity and my origin," and was proud to continue that for "a song from the track list of the first and most anticipated black superhero movie." With the success that his song would find through the Black Panther album release, Saudi added that "it wasn't supposed to happen like this; I was told that that I wouldn't appeal to an international audience but here I am. I'm so grateful." Additionally, Göransson worked with Lamar and Sounwave during the filmmaking process, spending time with them in their studio to create "collaborative excerpts" for throughout the film. He contributed to the song "Opps" that is played during a car chase in the film. Coogler praised this collaboration, especially how Göransson was able to weave elements from Lamar's songs "in and out of the orchestral stuff that he was already doing." Sounwave noted that it was a challenge to balance all of the different styles of artists on the album, like the "kerosene beats" of SOB x RBE with "Afrofuturist rapper" Vince Staples, while remaining consistent with Lamar's previous work and also being accessible to all potential filmgoers.

== Release ==
=== Singles ===
Lamar released the first single from his soundtrack album, "All the Stars", on January 4, 2018, in which he collaborated with fellow Top Dawg artist SZA. Shortly after, a new trailer for the film featured "Opps" by Lamar and Vince Staples. A second song by Lamar with Jay Rock, Future, and James Blake called "King's Dead" was released later in the month. On February 2, "Pray for Me" by Lamar and the Weeknd was released as the album's third and final single.

=== Black Panther: The Album ===
Lamar's soundtrack was released as Black Panther: The Album on February 9, 2018. The album features artwork by Nikolas A. Draper-Ivey, an artist known online for his fan art based on Disney intellectual property such as Black Panther and Spider-Man. Draper-Ivey was surprised when he was approached about providing artwork for the album by Interscope Records, but was excited to join the project and produced an initial mock-up within a day. He then refined the piece with input from the studio, and noted that it was much more minimalistic than his usual work, with a focus on hinting at power rather than overstating. A vinyl version of the album was released in early May 2018.

==== Track listing ====
Credits adapted from liner notes and digital booklet:

No.	Title	Writer(s)	Producer(s)	Length
1.	"Black Panther" (performed by Kendrick Lamar)	Kendrick Duckworth; Mark Spears; Kevin Gomringer; Tim Gomringer; Matt Schaeffer	Kendrick Lamar; Sounwave; Cubeatz	2:11
2.	"All the Stars" (performed by Kendrick Lamar and SZA)	Duckworth; Solána Rowe; Spears; Al Shuckburgh; Anthony Tiffith	Sounwave; Al Shux	3:56
3.	"X" (performed by Schoolboy Q, 2 Chainz, and Saudi)	Quincy Hanley; Tauheed Epps; Anele Mbisha; Duckworth; Spears; Tiffith; Ramon Ibanga, Jr.	Sounwave; Illmind	4:27
4.	"The Ways" (performed by Khalid and Swae Lee)	Khalid Robinson; Khalif Brown; Duckworth; Spears; Matthew Tavares; Chester Hansen; Leland Whitty; Alexander Sowinski	Sounwave; BadBadNotGood; Kendrick Lamar	3:59
5.	"Opps" (performed by Vince Staples and Yugen Blakrok)	Vincent Staples; Spears; Duckworth; Ludwig Göransson	Sounwave; Göransson	3:01
6.	"I Am" (performed by Jorja Smith)	Jorja Smith; Duckworth; Spears; Tobias Breuer; Troy Chester	Sounwave; Kendrick Lamar	3:29
7.	"Paramedic!" (performed by SOB X RBE, Kendrick Lamar, and Zacari)	Juwon Lee; Graham Harris; Wayman Barrow; Jabbar Brown; Zacari Pacaldo; Duckworth; Dacoury Natche; Spears; K. Gomringer; T. Gomringer	DJ Dahi; Sounwave; Cubeatz	3:39
8.	"Bloody Waters" (performed by Ab-Soul, Anderson Paak & James Blake)	Herbert Stevens IV; Brandon Anderson; James Litherland; Duckworth; Spears; Robin Braun	Sounwave; Kendrick Lamar; Robin Hannibal	4:32
9.	"King's Dead" (performed by Jay Rock, Kendrick Lamar, Future, and James Blake)	Johnny McKinzie; Duckworth; Nayvadius Wilburn; Litherland; Tiffith; Michael Williams II; Travis Walton; Spears; Samuel Gloade; Antwon Hicks; Axel Morgan	Sounwave; Mike Will Made It; Teddy Walton; 30 Roc; Twon Beatz; Axlfolie	3:50
10.	"Redemption Interlude" (performed by Zacari)	Pacaldo; Duckworth; Hykeem Carter, Jr.; Tiffith	Baby Keem; Kendrick Lamar	1:25
11.	"Redemption" (performed by Zacari and Babes Wodumo)	Pacaldo; Kurtis McKenzie; Mike Riley; Bongekile Simelane; Mandla Maphumulo; Duckworth; Walton	McKenzie; Walton; Scribz Riley	3:42
12.	"Seasons" (performed by Mozzy, Sjava, and Reason)	Timothy Patterson; Jabulani Hadebe; Robert Gill; Duckworth; Spears; Adam Feeney	Sounwave; Kendrick Lamar; Frank Dukes	4:02
13.	"Big Shot" (performed by Kendrick Lamar and Travis Scott)	Duckworth; Jacques Webster II; Tiffith; Ronald LaTour; Brock Korsan; K. Gomringer; T. Gomringer; Spears	Cardo; Cubeatz	3:42
14.	"Pray for Me" (performed by The Weeknd and Kendrick Lamar)	Abel Tesfaye; Duckworth; Feeney; Martin McKinney	Frank Dukes; Doc McKinney	3:31
Total length:				49:19

Notes

- Kendrick Lamar contributes vocals to every track, including additional vocals on those he is not credited on.
- "Redemption" features uncredited vocals by Mampintsha.
- "Big Shot" contains an uncredited interpolation of "New Freezer" by Rich the Kid featuring Kendrick Lamar.

==== Additional personnel ====
Credits adapted from digital booklet:

Musicians

- Ezinma – string arrangement (tracks 1, 2)
- Sounwave – string arrangement (tracks 1, 2)
- Bēkon – additional strings (tracks 6, 12)
- Rascal – original sample (track 6)
- Knukuth – original sample (track 6)
- James Blake – additional keys (track 8)
- Rob Gueringer – additional bass and guitar (track 12)

Technical

- Matt Schaeffer – recording (tracks 1–9, 11, 13), mixing (tracks 1–10)
- Sam Ricci – recording (track 2)
- James Hunt – recording (track 3)
- Ruff Nkosi – recording (Saudi, track 3; Sjava, track 12)
- Nolan Presley – recording (2 Chainz, track 3)
- Michael Law Thomas – recording (Vince Staples, track 5)
- LMNZ – recording (Yugen Blakrok, track 5)
- Max Perry – recording (SOB X RBE, track 7)
- Joshua Smith – recording (James Blake, track 8)
- Nevin J. Thomas – recording (Anderson Paak, track 8)
- Eric Manco – recording (Future, track 9)
- Baby Keem – recording (track 10)
- Zacari – recording (track 10)
- Mandla Maphumulo – recording (Babes Wodumo, track 11)
- DaveO – recording (Mozzy, track 12)
- Mark "Keitel" Lowe Jr. – recording (Reason, track 12)
- Jimmy Cash – recording (Travis Scott, track 13)
- Beatriz Artola – recording (Kendrick Lamar, track 14)
- Shin Kamiyama – recording (The Weeknd, track 14)
- Mike Sonier – production and recording (The Weeknd, track 14)
- Doc McKinney – recording (Samrawit Hailu, track 14)
- Barry McCready – assistant engineering (track 14)
- Derek "MixedByAli" Ali – mixing (tracks 11, 13)
- Jaycen Joshua – mixing (track 14)
- Cyrus Taghipour – mixing assistance (tracks 11, 13)
- David Nakaji – mixing assistance (track 14)
- Mike Bozzi – mastering (all tracks)
- Mike Dean – mastering (track 13)
- Chris Athens – mastering (track 14)

=== Black Panther (Original Score) ===
An album featuring Göransson's score was released digitally by Hollywood Records on February 16, 2018. A vinyl version of the score album was released on May 18.

==== Digital release ====
All music composed by Ludwig Göransson:

No.	Title	Length
1.	"Wakanda Origins"	1:44
2.	"Royal Talon Fighter"	4:00
3.	"Wakanda" (featuring Baaba Maal)	2:20
4.	"Warrior Falls"	4:06
5.	"The Jabari"	1:08
6.	"Waterfall Fight"	4:03
7.	"Ancestral Plane"	4:27
8.	"Killmonger"	2:55
9.	"Phambili"	2:31
10.	"Casino Brawl"	3:32
11.	"Busan Car Chase"	2:49
12.	"Questioning Klaue"	3:32
13.	"Outsider"	2:07
14.	"Is This Wakanda?"	2:46
15.	"Killmonger's Challenge"	5:07
16.	"Killmonger vs. T'Challa"	3:30
17.	"Loyal to the Throne"	1:35
18.	"Killmonger's Dream"	3:15
19.	"Burn It All"	3:24
20.	"Entering Jabariland"	2:42
21.	"Wake Up T'Challa"	6:08
22.	"The Great Mound Battle"	3:48
23.	"Glory to Bast"	6:06
24.	"The Jabari, Pt. II"	2:22
25.	"A Kings Sunset" (featuring Baaba Maal)	4:28
26.	"A New Day"	1:47
27.	"Spaceship Bugatti"	1:23
28.	"United Nations / End Titles"	7:32
Total length:		1:35:07

==== Vinyl release ====
All music composed by Ludwig Göransson:

Side A
No.	Title	Length
1.	"Wakanda" (featuring Baaba Maal)	2:20
2.	"Warrior Falls"	4:06
3.	"Waterfall Fight"	4:03
4.	"Ancestral Plane"	4:27
5.	"Killmonger"	2:55
6.	"Casino Brawl"	3:32
7.	"Busan Car Chase"	2:49
Total length:		24:12

Side B
No.	Title	Length
1.	"Killmonger's Challenge"	5:07
2.	"Killmonger vs. T'Challa"	3:30
3.	"Burn It All"	3:24
4.	"The Great Mound Battle"	3:48
5.	"Glory to Bast"	6:06
6.	"A Kings Sunset" (featuring Baaba Maal)	4:28
Total length:		26:23

=== Live performance ===
From September 10–12, 2021, the Los Angeles Philharmonic along with Maal, Massamba Diop, Magatte Saw, and an ensemble of African drummers performed the film's score at the Hollywood Bowl. Göransson had been urging Disney and Marvel to do this for some time, and was thrilled that the Philharmonic agreed to do it and that Maal and the African musicians were able to travel to Los Angeles during the COVID-19 pandemic. The choral and music-production elements of the score were played from the original tracks during the performance against the live orchestra and soloists, with Thomas Wilkins conducting. The orchestra also played a version of "All the Stars".

== Reception ==
=== Commercial performance ===
The soundtrack album debuted at number one on the US Billboard 200 with 154,000 equivalent album units, including 52,000 from pure album sales. It remained at the number one spot in its second week, moving 131,000 equivalent album units with 40,000 from pure album sales.

Weekly chart positions for Black Panther: The Album
Chart (2018)	Peak position
Australian Albums (ARIA)	2
Austrian Albums (Ö3 Austria)	13
Belgian Albums (Ultratop Flanders)	8
Belgian Albums (Ultratop Wallonia)	35
Canadian Albums (Billboard)	1
Danish Albums (Hitlisten)	1
Dutch Albums (Album Top 100)	2
Finnish Albums (Suomen virallinen lista)	2
French Albums (SNEP)	18
German Albums (Offizielle Top 100)	12
Italian Compilation Albums (FIMI)	4
New Zealand Albums (RMNZ)	2
Norwegian Albums (VG-lista)	1
Swiss Albums (Schweizer Hitparade)	7
UK Compilations Chart (OCC)	9
US Billboard 200	1
US Top R&B/Hip-Hop Albums (Billboard)	1
US Soundtrack Albums (Billboard)	1

Chart (2025)	Position
Nigerian Albums (TurnTable)	96

Year-end chart positions for Black Panther: The Album
Chart (2018)	Position
Australian Albums (ARIA)	20
Belgian Albums (Ultratop Flanders)	53
Belgian Albums (Ultratop Wallonia)	196
Canadian Albums (Billboard)	11
Danish Albums (Hitlisten)	26
Dutch Albums (MegaCharts)	55
Estonian Albums (IFPI)	11
French Albums (SNEP)	100
Icelandic Albums (Plötutíóindi)	30
New Zealand Albums (RMNZ)	11
US Billboard 200	12
US Top R&B/Hip-Hop Albums (Billboard)	8
US Soundtrack Albums (Billboard)	2

Chart (2019)	Position
US Billboard 200	184
US Soundtrack Albums (Billboard)	6

Chart (2020)	Position
US Soundtrack Albums (Billboard)	14

Chart (2021)	Position
US Soundtrack Albums (Billboard)	11

Chart (2022)	Position
US Soundtrack Albums (Billboard)	14

Chart (2023)	Position
US Soundtrack Albums (Billboard)	13

Chart (2024)	Position
US Soundtrack Albums (Billboard)	18

Chart (2025)	Position
US Top R&B/Hip-Hop Albums (Billboard)	96
US Soundtrack Albums (Billboard)	8

Decade-end chart positions for Black Panther: The Album
Chart (2010–2019)	Position
US Billboard 200	93

Certifications for Black Panther: The Album

Region	Certification	Certified units/sales
Australia (ARIA)	Gold	35,000^{‡}
Canada (Music Canada)	2× Platinum	160,000^{‡}
Denmark (IFPI Danmark)	Platinum	20,000^{‡}
France (SNEP)	Platinum	100,000^{‡}
New Zealand (RMNZ)	3× Platinum	45,000^{‡}
Singapore (RIAS)	Gold	5,000^{*}
United Kingdom (BPI)	Silver	60,000^{‡}
United States (RIAA)	Platinum	1,000,000
^{*} Sales figures based on certification alone.^{‡} Sales+streaming figures based on certification alone.

Chart positions for Black Panther (Original Score)
Chart (2018)	Peak position
Belgian Albums (Ultratop Flanders)	193
US Billboard 200	64
US World Albums (Billboard)	1

=== Critical response ===
==== Soundtrack ====
Professional ratings
Aggregate scores
Source	Rating
AnyDecentMusic?	7.5/10
Metacritic	80/100
Review scores
Source	Rating
AllMusic	4/5 stars
Consequence of Sound	B+
Clash	4/5 stars
The Guardian	4/5 stars
Highsnobiety	4/5
HipHopDX	4.5/5
The Independent	4/5 stars
NME	4/5 stars
Pitchfork	7.5/10
Rolling Stone	4/5 stars

Aggregator Metacritic, which uses a weighted average, assigned Black Panther: The Album a score of 80 out of 100 based on 14 critics, indicating "generally favorable reviews". AnyDecentMusic? found the album had an average score of 7.5 out of 10.

Matt Miller of Esquire said the album was a "stunning moment in film history ... an absolute milestone," feeling that the fact that "these topics can even be breached on a [Disney] platform like this seems like progress might be possible." Clayton Purdom at The A.V. Club felt the Black Panther soundtrack was one of the best rap albums in 2018, saying the individual songs "play it safe, but the project itself does not, an audacious exertion of energy from one of the planet's most universally revered musicians... the album doesn't need the film; it works on its own." He compared it to other artist-driven soundtracks for films like Tron: Legacy, Coffy, and 8 Mile. Writing for Vice, Robert Christgau called the music "sneakily experimental pop-rap" and credited Lamar for "marking every [song] with a verse or chorus or hook defined by the least regal of the great rap flows, unassumingly slurred while making every word count."

Andy Kellman gave the soundtrack four stars out of five for AllMusic, calling it an "unprecedented convergence of the mainstream film industry with an uncompromising musician thriving commercially and artistically." He felt that the majority of the album's guest artists treated it as a Kendrick Lamar album rather than a soundtrack, but thought it served both purposes well. Larry Bartleet also gave the album four stars in his review for NME. Bartleet called it the new gold standard for Marvel soundtracks, and said it was difficult to pick a standout moment. He highlighted how Lamar's lyrics reflect the viewpoints of T'Challa and Killmonger at different times, matching the film's "empathetic understanding of both characters." Reviewing the album for Pitchfork, Sheldon Pearce said it "is finely-tuned, aware of its audience, its objectives, and the stakes." Pearce felt the album was convoluted and generic at time, but ultimately it "delivers on its promise, much like the larger comic world it now occupies." Kathleen Johnston at GQ described the album as worth celebrating, stating that what it lacks "in pure aural aestheticism, it more than makes up for in intent." She felt the South African artists included made the soundtrack "a fully fledged celebration of pan-continental black talent," echoing the film's message of representation as opposed to "mere tokenism". Johnston praised the album, alongside the film, as "the ultimate celebration of black excellence. [It] will go down as a historic landmark in the diversification of popular culture."

At Rolling Stone, Jody Rosen felt the album was a fascinating entry to Lamar's discography. He wrote that the elements from the Black Panther mythology that were included in the soundtrack were "goofy," but that they aligned with the themes of Lamar's other work, and also praised the female artists featured, specifically naming SZA, Jorja Smith, and Yugen Blakrok. Jon Parelis at The New York Times stated that all of the symbolic weight attached to the film extended itself to the album as well, and felt that the product was almost as densely packed with ideas as any of Lamar's solo works. Parelis praised Sounwave's efforts as producer on the album, but noted that a majority of the guest artists treated their songs like music for California rather than the African setting of the film. For Thrillist, Dan Jackson said the album is not "an exercise in auteur-driven control like Prince's brilliantly odd Batman soundtrack, but it's not purely a cynical cash-in either." Jackson praised the rap-heavy moments and the segments dedicated to Killmonger's perspective, but felt that it may be too similar to previous albums released by Top Dawg Entertainment in terms of aesthetic and concluded that there are "limits to the album and the film's audacity." Alexis Petridis of The Guardian called the soundtrack enjoyable rather than essential, but acknowledged that this could be due to the high standards set by Lamar's previous work. He was positive of Lamar not letting the MCU "reign in" his style, but did think the album was less consistent than some of Lamar's other work.

Also writing for Vice, Lawrence Burney criticized the number of non-American artists featured on the album, lamenting that it could have been "so much more" if it had represented more global black communities. He concluded that "there is room to wonder what the outcome would have been if Kendrick and the rest of TDE swapped out James Blake and a few American rappers for artists like Jamaica's Spice [or] Brazil's Karol Conká ... It could have made an equally-remarkable accompanying musical piece to Black Panther. But if those chances are never taken, especially with platforms as big as Marvel in support, we may not get to see what an artistic coming-together could really do for diasporic relations." Dustin Seibert was excited for the album's release, but in his review of it for The Grio he expressed disappointment, finding many of the songs to be mediocre and especially criticizing Lamar's supportive work which he felt detracted from some of the guest performances. Seibert also criticized lyrics that he found to be demeaning to women or even "basic scumbag gangster bars," which he saw as clashing with the themes of the film. He stated his hope that the film itself be better than the underwhelming soundtrack album.

==== Score ====
Brian Josephs at Pitchfork praised Göransson's "spectacular" score, feeling the composer was not simply "ticking off the diasporic boxes" by rooting the African elements of his music in the emotions of the film. Josephs noted the care and development that Göransson displays in the song "Wakanda" and in Killmonger's theme, such as the unique elements used in the latter that serve to disrupt the music of Wakanda when that character arrives in the country. Jonathan Broxton for Movie Music UK credited Göransson for his research and commitment to faithfully conveying African music in the score, rather than just using "indeterminate ethnic drumming"; he suggested that this could be "all for nothing if the final score doesn't act as a good and appropriate film score in its own right," but "Göransson's composing chops are strong, and as a result the score for Black Panther soars." Broxton particularly praised the different layers of the themes for T'Challa and Killmonger, and how Göransson was able to deconstruct them and use their elements throughout the score. He concluded that the score is "culturally appropriate, instrumentally fascinating ... and has an intelligent thematic architecture that is worthy of overt praise."

Reviewing the score for AllMusic, Neil Z. Yeung gave it four out of five stars, calling it triumphant and highlighting the moments where the African elements were combined with traditional orchestra and modern hip-hop. Luke Martin of Fortitude Magazine said the score "blows other Marvel soundtracks out of the water," calling it rich in African sounds that add gravity to "every aspect of the story, rooted in an emotional context." He also highlighted the brass music for royalty as well as the use of modern music in Killmonger's theme. Sean Wilson at mfiles compared the score to Jerry Goldsmith's "masterpiece" The Ghost and the Darkness, calling it "authentic, moving and inspiring." He did think it was close to being "overly lengthy" on album, but felt the music overcame this in its "dynamic and vibrant" textures, combining Hollywood heroism with authentic Senegalese music to become a score that Wilson felt could not be accused of lacking in personality as other MCU scores have been. Bekah Burbank at Laughing Place praised the score as "remarkably unique," finding it to be one of Marvel's best. She particularly praised "Wakanda" as passionate and emotive, comparing it to The Lion King's "Circle of Life" as "our introduction to the country and people ... you are instantly transported there." Burbank was also positive of the action music, such as during the Casino fight sequence.

Mihnea Manduteanu, on his website Soundtrack Dreams, praised the score as a breath of fresh air compared to previous MCU film scores. Highlighting the many different styles of music that Göransson combined, he stated, "I haven't heard film music quite like this. It's a fusion of styles and moods like no other." He concluded that where the film is a game-changer for the industry, the score is a game-changer for MCU soundtracks. Filmtracks.com's Christian Clemmensen gave the score four stars out of five, calling it "one of the most striking and potentially dizzying scores of this generation," with Göransson generally succeeding in combining the various elements of his music. Clemmensen praised the use of percussion and vocals in the score, and called it thematically "quite well developed"—in particular, Clemmensen praised the main fanfare as "an easily identifiable theme to combat all the other elements of the score, not to mention" Lamar's soundtrack. Still, he thought the best work in the score was Killmonger's theme, which provides "the score's most heartfelt expressions." Conversely, Clemmensen felt passages featuring the Jabari theme were "intellectually interesting but ... borderline intolerable," and was also disappointed in some of the general electronic elements used. He added that the album "definitely needs some trimming," but overall compared the score to Mark Mothersbaugh's for Thor: Ragnarok in being "another fantastic diversion from the norm in the Marvel Cinematic Universe without sacrificing the genre's core necessities."

Anton Smit of Soundtrack World was surprised by the score, expecting to hear standard superhero music and instead finding something fresh that "really uses genuine African elements, not just sounds that come out of a computer." Smit praised the combination of African, orchestral, and electronic music, as well as Göransson's use of leitmotifs. He noted how the percussion usually found in a "bombastic" Hollywood score is replaced here with performances that do not "seem brainless at all as you can feel the soul the African musicians put into their play," and concluded that Göransson lived up to the African tradition of telling stories through music. Pete Simons on Synchrotones's Soundtrack Reviews found the score to be fun, describing it as "a rousing superhero score and an outlandish ethnic score rolled into one." He highlighted the action music, and called the use of talking drums to sound out T'Challa's name and the screaming of "Killmonger" in that character's theme both "nice touches." However, Simons did think the score was somewhat repetitive, that Göransson may have tried to add too many elements to the music, and that the album presentation featured some inconsistent mixing. James Southall of Movie Wave thought Göransson had devised some good ideas, especially Killmonger's theme which he thought was both surprising and fascinating, but that they were stretched too thin on the album. He called this presentation a shame, feeling that the score had the potential to earn a four star (out of five) score but in reality deserved two stars due to the album length.

=== Industry impact ===
Lamar's soundtrack, along with that of the film The Greatest Showman (2017), was named as proof of a "soundtrack renaissance" with growing public interest in albums tied to films. Atlantic Records president Kevin Weaver said that "when the right music is aligned to the right media, especially with these new means of music distribution, primarily streaming, it's created a whole new world for soundtracks that didn't previously exist." Interscope Records executive Manny Smith felt that Black Panther: The Album stood out because of the strong direction from Coogler and Lamar, adding, "I think it'll spark people to make more culturally relevant music and be more aware. That's always our goal." David Bakula, Vice President of Analytics at Nielsen Entertainment, said the album was "much bigger than just a music release. It's much bigger than just a compilation album." MIDiA research analyst Zach Fuller added that the success of the album could be "indicative of streaming bringing people back to this [soundtrack-centric] model ... it may well be the film industry that leads the way in preserving the album as an artistic medium." He compared this possible trend to the way Bollywood films affect popular music in India.

=== Accolades ===
Year	Award	Category	Recipient(s)	Result	Ref(s)
2018
2018	Billboard Music Awards	Top Soundtrack	Black Panther: The Album	Nominated	
2018	BET Awards	Album of the Year	Black Panther: The Album	Nominated	
2018	Saturn Awards	Best Film Music	Ludwig Göransson	Nominated	
2018	Teen Choice Awards	Choice Music: Collaboration	"Pray for Me"	Nominated	
2018	Teen Choice Awards	Choice Music: R&B/Hip-Hop Song	"All the Stars"	Nominated	
2018	MTV Video Music Awards	Best Visual Effects	"All the Stars" (Loris Paillier for BUF Paris)	Won	
2018	iHeartRadio Much Music Video Awards	Best Collaboration	"All the Stars"	Nominated	
2018	iHeartRadio Much Music Video Awards	Best Collaboration	"Pray for Me"	Nominated	
2018	American Music Awards	Top Soundtrack	Black Panther: The Album	Won	
2018	World Soundtrack Awards	Best Original Song Written Directly for a Film	"Black Panther"	Won	
2018	Hollywood Music in Media Awards	Original Score – Sci-Fi/Fantasy/Horror Film	Ludwig Göransson	Won	
2018	Hollywood Music in Media Awards	Original Song – Sci-Fi/Fantasy/Horror Film	"All the Stars"	Won	
2018	Hollywood Music in Media Awards	Soundtrack Album	Black Panther: The Album	Won	
2018	Hollywood Music in Media Awards	Outstanding Music Supervision – Film	Dave Jordan	Nominated	
2018	African American Film Critics Association	Best Original Song	"All the Stars"	Won	
2018	Washington D.C. Area Film Critics Association Awards	Score	Ludwig Göransson	Nominated	
2019	Houston Film Critics Society	Best Score	Ludwig Göransson	Nominated	
2019	Houston Film Critics Society	Best Song	"All the Stars"	Nominated	
2019	Online Film Critics Society	Best Score	Ludwig Göransson	Nominated	
2019	Satellite Awards	Best Original Song	"All the Stars"	Nominated	
2019	Golden Globe Awards	Best Original Score	Ludwig Göransson	Nominated	
2019	Golden Globe Awards	Best Original Song	"All the Stars"	Nominated	
2019	Critics' Choice Movie Awards	Best Song	"All the Stars"	Nominated	
2019	Critics' Choice Movie Awards	Best Score	Ludwig Göransson	Nominated	
2019	Art Directors Guild	Commercial and Music Video	"All the Stars" (Ethan Tobman)	Nominated	
2019	Black Reel Awards	Outstanding Original Song	"All the Stars"	Won	
2019	Black Reel Awards	Outstanding Original Song	"Pray for Me"	Nominated	
2019	Black Reel Awards	Outstanding Score	Ludwig Göransson	Nominated	
2019	Grammy Awards	Album of the Year	Black Panther: The Album	Nominated	
2019	Grammy Awards	Record of the Year	"All the Stars"	Nominated	
2019	Grammy Awards	Song of the Year	"All the Stars"	Nominated	
2019	Grammy Awards	Best Rap Performance	"King's Dead"	Won	
2019	Grammy Awards	Best Rap/Sung Performance	"All the Stars"	Nominated	
2019	Grammy Awards	Best Rap Song	"King's Dead"	Nominated	
2019	Grammy Awards	Best Score Soundtrack for Visual Media	Black Panther: The Score	Won	
2019	Grammy Awards	Best Song Written for Visual Media	"All the Stars"	Nominated	
2019	Guild of Music Supervisors Awards	Best Song/Recording Created for a Film	"All the Stars"	Nominated	
2019	Guild of Music Supervisors Awards	Best Music Supervision for Film Budgeted over $25 Million	Dave Jordan	Nominated	
2019	International Film Music Critics Association	Composer of the Year	Ludwig Göransson	Nominated	
2019	International Film Music Critics Association	Score of the Year	Ludwig Göransson	Nominated	
2019	International Film Music Critics Association	Best Original Score – Fantasy/Science Fiction/Horror Film	Ludwig Göransson	Nominated	
2019	Academy Awards	Best Original Song	"All the Stars"	Nominated	
2019	Academy Awards	Best Original Score	Ludwig Göransson	Won	
2019	Juno Awards	Single of the Year	"Pray for Me"	Nominated	
2019	NAACP Image Awards	Outstanding Duo, Group or Collaboration	"All the Stars"	Won	
2019	NAACP Image Awards	Outstanding Soundtrack/Compilation	Black Panther: The Album	Won	

== Black Panther: Wakanda Remixed ==
Black Panther: Wakanda Remixed

EP by Various Artists
- Released: August 16, 2018
- Length: 12:11
- Labels: Hollywood; Marvel Music

=== Background ===
On August 16, 2018, Hollywood Records and Marvel Music released an extended play titled Black Panther: Wakanda Remixed, featuring remixes of five cues from Göransson's score. Göransson worked with several other artists to create the remixes. Music videos for each of the remixes were also released to Marvel Music's Vevo channel on YouTube.

=== Track listing ===
No.	Title	Length
1.	"Wakanda (DJ Dahi Remix)" (Featuring Baaba Maal)	2:48
2.	"Killmonger (WondaGurl Remix)"	3:12
3.	"Ancestral Plane (Uzowuru and Kleinman Remix)"	2:44
4.	"Waterfalls (Ludwig Göransson Remix)"	2:10
5.	"Black Panther (Ludwig Göransson Remix)" (Featuring Ame Kora)	1:17
Total length:		12:11

=== Reception ===
James Whitbrook of io9 praised the EP as improving Göransson's already "sublime" score, calling the remixes "all pretty great, chill takes" on the existing music. Whitbrook particularly praised the new take on the "Black Panther" theme as a "stirring choral anthem ... while still keeping that electrifying drumbeat that made the original one of the best character themes on a Marvel movie soundtrack." Hoair-Tran Bui at /Film said the EP was unlikely to become as popular as the main score or soundtrack albums, but felt that it provided "the perfect capper for the summer, and an energizing vehicle for Black Panther to ride through Oscar season." For Complex, Joshua Espinoza recommended the remixes to fans of the score and soundtrack albums, and also described them as "chill tunes."
