= Gqom =

South African electronic dance music genre

- Other names: Igqomu; gqom tech; sgubhu; 3-step; G.Q.O.M
- Stylistic origins: Durban kwaito; isicathamiya; house; afro house; mbube; techno; broken beat; sgxumseni
- Cultural origins: Early 2010s, Durban, KwaZulu-Natal, South Africa
- Typical instruments: Vocals; drone; keyboards; whistle; drum pads; ululation
- Derivative forms: Amapiano; bérite club; cruise; street pop; UK gqom

Subgenres
- Afrikaans gqom (gqom Afrikaans); core tribe; electro gqom music (EGM); gqom 2.0; gqom gospel (Cape Town gqom/gospel gqom); gqom tech; gqom trap; isqinsi; mbumbulu style; sgubhu; taxi kick; 3-step; uThayela; umgido; unti style

Fusion genres
- Amapiano; bérite club; cruise; street pop; quantum sound

Local scenes
- Cape Town; East London; Gqeberha; Johannesburg; Limpopo; Mpumalanga

Gqom (Zulu: [ᶢǃʱòm]), igqomu ([iᶢǃʱòmu]), gqom tech, sgubhu, 3-step or G.Q.O.M is a South African electronic dance music genre and subgenre of house music, that emerged in the early 2010s from Durban, pioneered and innovated by music producers Naked Boyz, Rudeboyz, Sbucardo, Griffit Vigo, Nasty Boyz, DJ Lag, Menzi Shabane, Distruction Boyz and Citizen Boy.

Unlike other South African electronic music, traditional gqom is typified by minimal, raw and repetitive sound with heavy bass but without the four-on-the-floor rhythm pattern.

Music industry personnel who were pivotal in accelerating the genre's international acclaim in the genre's initial developmental phases included the likes of South African rapper Okmalumkoolkat, Italian record label Gqom Oh owner Nane Kolè, as well as other South Africans, including event curator and public relations liaison Cherish Lala Mankai, Afrotainment record label owner DJ Tira, Babes Wodumo, Mampintsha and Busiswa.

Gqom song
A raw 2-minute gqom beat

== Lexicology and morphology ==
The word gqom derives from an onomatopoeic combination of click consonants in the Zulu language (isiZulu) which could be interpreted as a "hitting drum", "ricochet" or "bang". Gqom's isiZulu pronunciation is pronounced with an alveolar click followed by a guttural "om". The word itself in a literal sense resembles the sound produced by a kick drum.

It is also expressed as GQOM (stylization), gqom tech, sgubhu, qgom, igqom, gqomu or variants thereof. Alternative names that later developed into subgenres are Sgubhu and 3 Step. Isgubhu and igqom are IsiZulu words to describe a drum sound or beat emanating from speakers, that became synonymous with Durban kwaito. The term "three-step" (3 step) was coined in the mid-2010s by gqom record producers Sbucardo and Citizen Boy to describe gqom music not only as a name, moreover attributed to a specific beat structure or pattern of gqom music preceding developing into a distinct subgenre of gqom.

== Characteristics ==
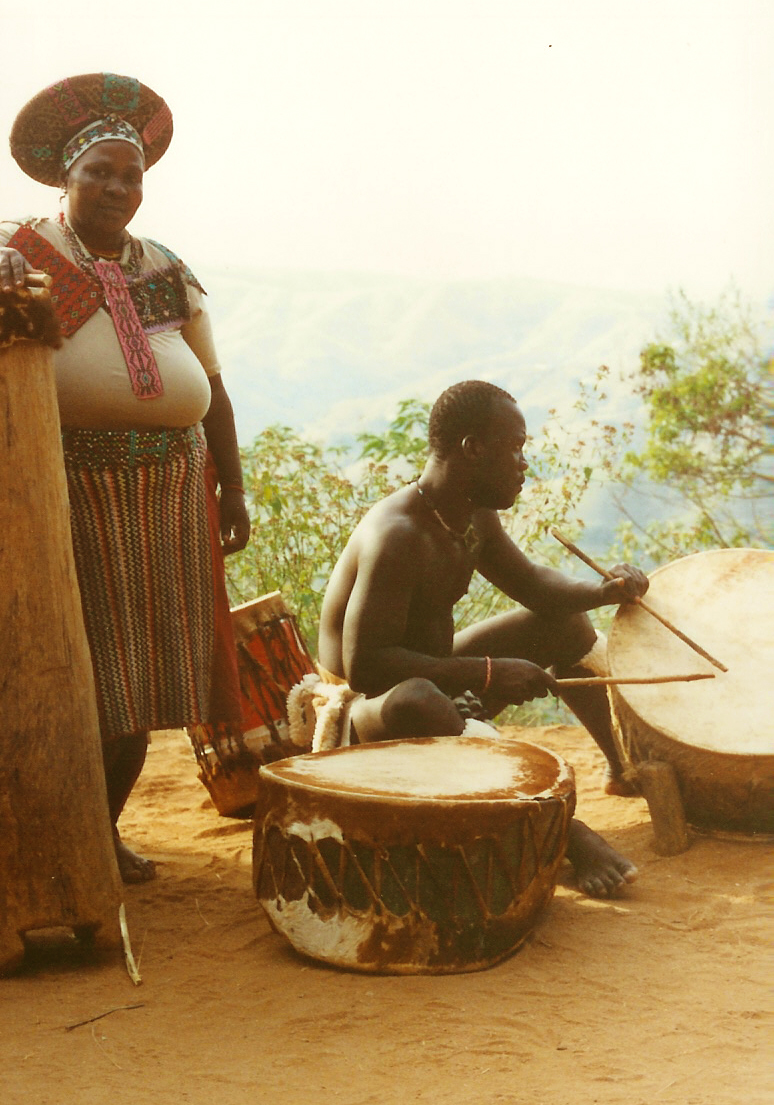
Traditional Zulu, drummer

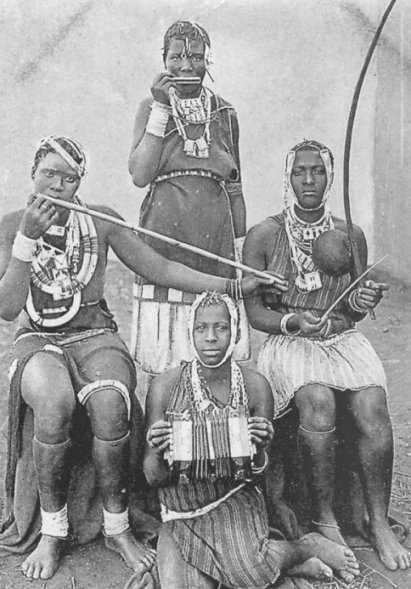
Zulu musicians, 1900

Gqom is known for its beats which have a minimal, raw and repetitive sound with heavy bass as well as incorporations of techno, Durban kwaito, kwaito, maskandi, afro house, breakbeat, tribal house and broken beat. Traditional gqom is mainly described as having a dark and hypnotic club sound. The style of beats does not primarily use the four-on-the-floor rhythm pattern which is often heard in other house music. Typical lyrical themes include nightlife. It often uses one phrase or a few lines which are repeated numerous times in the song. Gqom was developed by a young generation of technologically skilled DJs producing in D.I.Y. fashion with software such as FL Studio and often self distributing their music on file sharing platforms. Griffit Vigo is credited for pioneering the 'sweep' sound used within the genre, described as having a sound that resembles "the sound of a broom". Other notable sounds include, tom rolls and Zulu chants.

=== Gqom production and mixing ===
In 2018, Rudeboyz noted that they occasionally blend gqom with an array of other genres such as hip hop and pop. Gqom musicians often blend (gqom and afro-tech), together. Additionally, DJs commonly blend gqom with a conspicuous combination of sgubhu and hip hop during their sets. Sgubhu employs the typical elements found in gqom music production, however what sets it apart is the kick pattern. In sgubhu, the kick follows a consistent 4-beat pattern reminiscent of traditional house music and deep house. In 3-Step, a predominant 3-beat pattern or beats are commonly arranged in groups of three. Gqom 2.0, is characterized by a slower tempo, infused with other elements such as amapiano. Gqom exhibits variances in rhythm, for instance such as a 3-step (three-step), 4-step (four-step) and two-step tempo patterns.

== History ==
Gqom emerged in the early 2010s. Influences in the 2010s, cite acts such as Naked Boyz, prominently known for producing the track "Ithoyizi" which appeared on Afrotainment signee DJ Cndo's compilation as well as music producers Blaq Soul and Culoe de Song's inclination towards tribal house which involved experimenting with beat formations. Additionally, in certain Durban nightclubs, early gqom and tribal house seamlessly alternated in DJ sets, while the music of Durban kwaito, Pretoria (bacardi house) and Eastern Cape (isjokojoko) record producers like DJ Spoko, Machance, DJ Mujava, DJ Mthura and DJ Soso as well as sgxumseni (attributed to DJ Clock and DJ Gukwa) were prevalent during the era.

From the mid-2010s, the genre gained prominence abroad, especially in the cities of Lagos and London. Gqom entered commercial mainstream in the late 2010s and continued to grow in popularity, while also maintaining its "underground music and culture" existence.

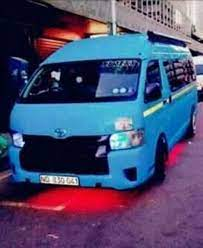
A common sight in South Africa is the customized and enhanced subwoofer-equipped mini van taxi such as a Toyota Quantum (referred to locally as ibomba), frequently blasting gqom at high volumes with amplified bass speakers.

Gqom also plays its part in increasing business profit for local taxis as people established a day to specifically celebrate gqom called "gqom explosion" that is mostly known as I-Nazoke. It is celebrated by people from the city of Durban, however eventually other cities and towns in KwaZulu-Natal started celebrating it, too.

"We had these artists signed on our label called TLC FAM. They have a taxi business and they have their own taxis. And so yeah, I had been with them on a Saturday night and it was crazy because we were going around Durban and we stop in the taxi rank where there was a lot of taxis playing gqom. It was crazy. The energy was like on another level. All these young kids on a Saturday night. It was amazing, amazing. And sometimes they put lights, like disco lights inside the taxi so it's like, proper mini club."

— FNK

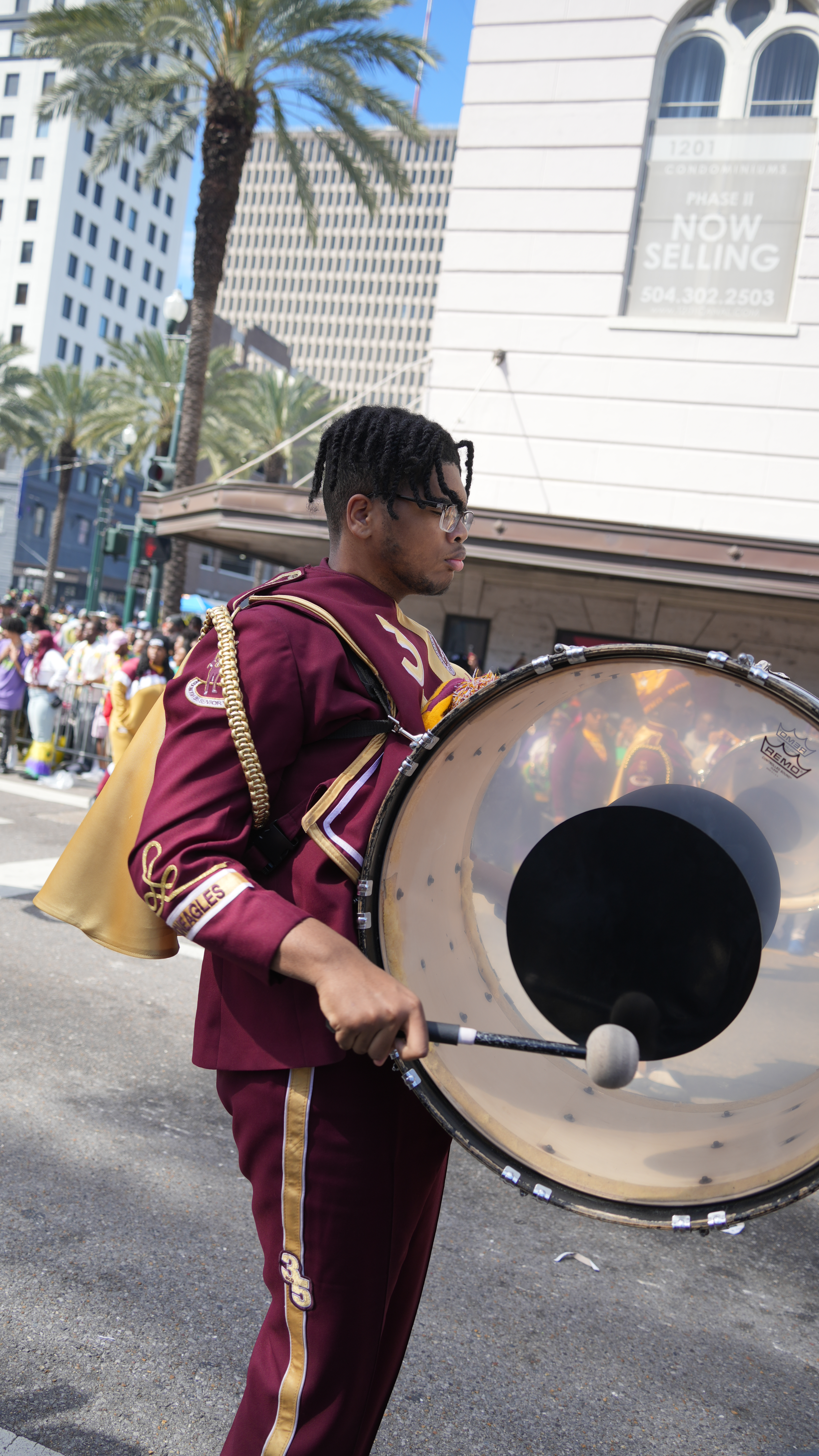
Drummer, at the Zulu parade (Zulu Social Aid & Pleasure Club) Mardi Gras in New Orleans, in 2024

As the genre gained international traction, this made way for increased international collaborations as well as popularization. In 2017, lead Empire (2015 TV series), actor Jussie Smollett was sighted dancing to and what appeared to be enjoying, the song "Omunye" by Distruction Boyz featuring Benny Maverick and Dlala Mshunqisi. Smollett described the song as "my jam".

"Wololo" singer and choreographer, Babes Wodumo, received a nomination for the BET Awards, BET Award for Best International Act: Africa, category.

In 2018, Babes Wodumo made an appearance on the Marvel Comics, Black Panther:Soundtrack album compilation by Kendrick Lamar showcasing a gqom vocal style delivery on the song "Redemption", additionally Wodumo collaborated with American electronic dancehall-reggae group Major Lazer on "Orkant/Balance Pon It" and displayed gqom dance moves in the official music video.

Duo, FAKA's (comprising Desire Marea and Fela Gucci) music from their "Amaqhawe" EP was enlisted by Italian fashion luxury designer Donatella Versace for the Versace Spring 2019 Menswear Collection, fashion show.

Both Distruction Boyz (comprising Que DJ and Goldmax) as well as Babes Wodumo were nominated for the MTV Europe Music Award for Best African Act, the ceremonies took place in London (2017) and Spain (2018). In the same year, Distruction Boyz were nominated at the BET Awards for BET Award for Best International Act: Africa additionally the duo performed at Sónar an arts, design and music festival in Spain.

In 2019, DJ Lag produced the song "My Power" for Beyoncé featuring various artists inclusive of songwriter and singer Busiswa and musician as well as dancer Moonchild Sanelly, the song was on the track list of The Lion King–inspired album, titled The Lion King: The Gift. At the 62nd Annual Grammy Awards, The Lion King: The Gift received a nomination for Best Pop Vocal Album. DJ Lag performed at the African Giants party which celebrated all the 2020 Grammy nominees from Africa. In October, during the rapper, poet, actress and songwriter Sho Madjozi's The Kelly Clarkson Show, performance WWE wrestler, John Cena made a surprise guest appearance performing the song, "John Cena" alongside her.

Thabo Ramokoena founded the Annual South African Gqom Awards. The awards honor various facets of gqom across different domains, including fashion and music, featuring 25 categories. The inaugural ceremony was held at the ICC Arena on 20 April 2019.

In 2021, the South African Music Awards, officially introduced separate categories for gqom and amapiano, which had previously been awarded under the Best Kwaito Album category.

Kizazi Moto: Generation Fire "Surf Sangoma" 2023 (Disney+)

In 2023, Disney Plus released an afrofuturism, sci-fi animated series Kizazi Moto: Generation Fire, which includes Surf Sangoma set in year 2050 in Durban directed by Spoek Mathambo (Nthato Mokgata) and Catherine Green. The animation film's soundtrack was gqom-inspired created by music producer Aero Manyelo.

DJ Lag won the Best Gqom album at the South African Music Awards.

== Subgenres ==
=== Afrikaans gqom ===
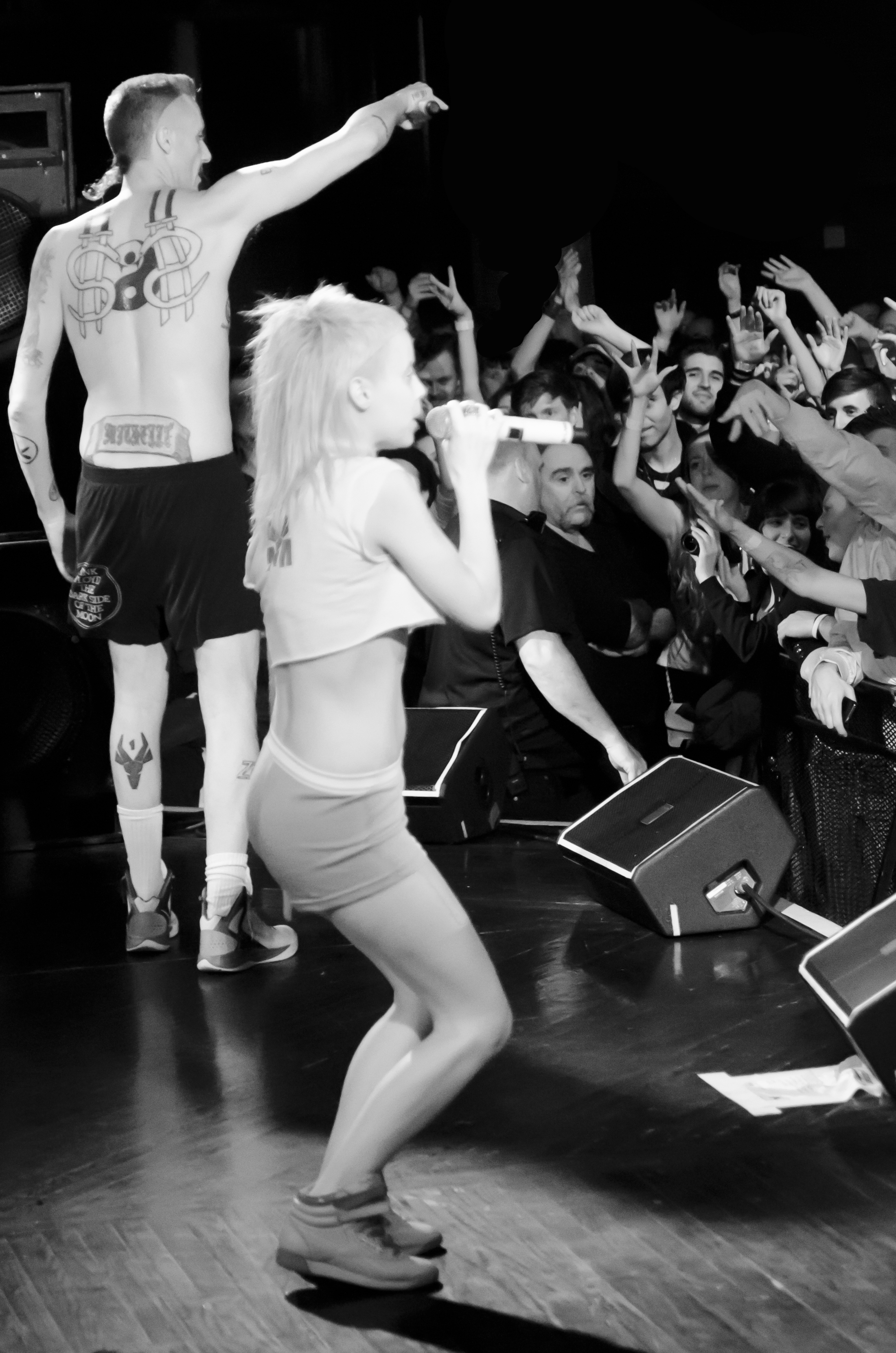
Die Antwoord

Afrikaans gqom (also Gqom Afrikaans) integrates Afrikaans language associated with Afrikaans culture and musical influences. It merges the distinctive beats and rhythms of gqom with Afrikaans lyrics and themes and appeals to Afrikaans-speaking audiences. Zef, rap-rave duo Die Antwoord and rapper Slagysta's "Baita Jou Sabela" 2019 single displayed a combination of Afrikaans, English and Sabela rap vocal-delivery. Some yaadt music producers ( a type of Afrikaans musical style originating in Cape Town) for instance Darryl Davids who produced "Baita Jou Sabela" are influenced musically by Distruction Boyz and Babes Wodumo's music. Prominent Afrikaans gqom musicians include Barkie Vieslik, Temple Boys Cpt, Weh Sliiso, Jay Music and Dlala ikamva Badlalele ikamva.

=== Core tribe ===
Core tribe gqom is characterized as frequent use of triplets (tresillio rhythm) as well as a blend of percussion patterns with tribal vocalizations. Syncopation plays a significant role in the production style, emphasizing drums over melodies. Illustrations of core tribe gqom music are Da Soul Boyz' Welcome To Durban EP and Dominowe's "Darbuka Tribe (Core Tribe)", single.

=== Electro gqom music (EGM) ===
Electro gqom music, abbreviated and referred to as "EGM" was introduced by Distruction Boyz and Griffit Vigo. It is characterized as upbeat and incorporates percussion instrument elements. EGM is described as dark, futuristic, esoteric and spiritually evocative. From the Streets to the World, an album by Distruction Boyz released in November 2019, demonstrated EGM.

=== Gqom 2.0 ===
Gqom 2.0 is characterized by decelerated beats and incorporates elements of amapiano, afrohouse, and afrotech.

=== Cape Town gqom ===
Cape Town gqom also referred to as gqom gospel or gospel gqom pioneered by Mr Thela, Mshayi and Cairo CPT in the 2020s incorporates gospel music and sgubhu elements interwoven with gqom in the form of a "church keyboard"-driven sound.

As a preacher's kid, Mr Thela played the keyboard every Sunday and listened to the "forbidden" gqom music with his friends later and became hooked to the sound.

— Velani Ludidi and Chuma Nontsele

=== Gqom tech ===
Gqom tech blends traditional gqom with elements of tech house and electro. The genre features a diverse array of musicians, including notable figures such as Menchess and singer, Sykes.

=== Gqom trap ===
Gqom trap, blending elements of gqom and trap music, arose in the 2010s, pioneered by the Durban hip hop collective Witness The Funk. In 2018, Record producer, DJ Maphorisa's BlaqBoyMusic EP, was an amalgamation of gqom and trap. The EP's opening song "Walk ye Phara" featured DJ Raybel, rapper and songwriter K.O., Moonchild Sanelly and ZuluMakhathini. BlaqBoyMusic included other various rappers, singers, record producers, and guest appearances by musicians such as Bontle Smith, A-Reece, Lerato Kganyago, Wichi 1080 and Lucasraps. Trap and amapiano rapper Costa Titch's Gqom Land EP released in 2019, comprised three songs, whereas the rapper delivered his verses over gqom beats.

=== Sgubhu ===
Sgubhu, a variant of gqom and a form of house music, shares certain characteristics with gqom but distinguishes itself through its beat structure. In a 2019 Afropop Worldwide interview transcript, Citizen Boy described sgubu as featuring a three-step esque kick pattern and the incorporation of synthesizers, citing DJ Maphorisa, Shimza and Moonchild Sanelly's "Makhe" single, as an example. Unlike typical gqom, sgubhu features a significantly steadier kick drum pattern often following a consistent 4-beat rhythm, resembling traditional house music and infused with elements of deep house. In praise of an Emo Kid song (regarded as one of the pioneers of sgubhu), Griffit Vigo remarked:

This track takes you back to a time before gqom. It's kind of like a tribal sgubhu, I think his mission was to show people where gqom started and where it led us as gqom producers.

— Griffit Vigo

=== Taxi kick ===
Taxi kick, is characterized by a heavily distorted kick, crash cymbals and triplets. It was created to specifically attract taxi passengers for taxi business owners and drivers. TLC Fam, a Newlands West musical collective comprising 23 record producers, disc jockeys, dancers and emcees developed as well as popularized the taxi kick, sound alongside other producers spanning the late 2010s and early 2020s.

=== 3-step ===
Following the introduction of the term "three-step" as an additional name for gqom music and a gqom beat structure associated with triple time coined by gqom producers in the 2010s, subsequent to the genre gaining mainstream popularity in the late 2010s and early 2020s, Emo Kid, DJ Lag, Ben Myster, and Menzi introduced, pioneered and developed a distinct variation of gqom known as "3-step" (also referred to as 3 step, three-step, and similar spelling variants). 3 step music is characterized by its gqom elements combined with triple time and broken beat features. Producers often blend 3-step with various other production styles and musical genres.

Like next month I'm releasing an EP under Goon Club Allstars, it's a record label from London. On that EP it's like strictly gqom. It's just three-step beats.

— DJ Lag, Afropop Worldwide

Triple metre, also referred to as triple time or American triple metre, is a musical time signature distinguished by its primary division of three beats per bar. This is typically indicated by a 3 (for simple) or a 9 (for compound) in the upper figure of the time signature, with examples such as 3/4, 3/8 and 9/8 being most prevalent. In 3-step, beats are often organized in sets of three, which gives rise to a triple metre characteristic in the music or song. 3 step emerged alongside sgubhu and gqom 2.0 another variant of gqom featuring a ritardando tempo, in contrast to traditional gqom, with integrations of afrohouse, afrotech and amapiano. An illustration being DJ Lag's Meeting With The King, album. In 2017, DJ Biza released a song titled, "3 Step". Dlala Thukzin's 2021, single "Phuze (remix)" featuring rapper Mpura, Zaba, Sir Trill and Rascoe Kaos showcased the fusion of gqom and amapiano together, possibly exponentially accelerating the subgenre's popularity. Thukzin is renowned for incorporating elements from amapiano as well as afrotech and merging them with gqom.

In 2023, Dlala Thukzin and Kabza De Small collaborated for the release of a single titled, "Magical Ideas" featured on Thukzin's, Permanent Music 3, EP. DJ Tira, Heavy-K, singer Makhadzi, Afro Brothers and Zee Nxumalo's 2024 single, "Inkululeko" (meant to be interpreted as "freedom") was inspired by June 16, 1976 the Soweto uprising which were student-lead protests during apartheid which accelerated the resistance of the regime both locally as well as internationally. The Rebellion album by DJ Lag incorporated elements of 3-step, afrotech, amapiano, hip hop and drill.

=== uThayela ===
uThayela, meaning "corrugated iron" symbolizes its ability to induce the physical shaking of objects (often cited as a roof) in the literal sense due to its bass-heavy broken beat gqom sound, crafted specifically for nightclub environments. The EP Uhuru by DJ Lag exemplifies this style of gqom. The genre was pioneered by Uniticipated Soundz.

== Derivative and fusion genres ==
=== Amapiano ===
Amapiano, combines elements of house, piano melodies, kwaito, gqom, deep house, jazz, soul and lounge music. Amapiano sample packs often feature sounds curated from gqom music. Initially known as iNumba the genre derives its name from IsiZulu which translates to "the pianos". Amapiano is thought to have evolved in various Johannesburg townships as well as introduced, pioneered and popularized by a plethora of various producers and DJs for instance The Soul Dictators, MFR Souls, Arasoul, Gabba Cannal, DJ Stokie, Kabza De Small, Luu Nineleven, Busisiwa, Sphectacula and DJ Naves, DJ Maphorisa and Sha Sha.

=== Bérite club ===
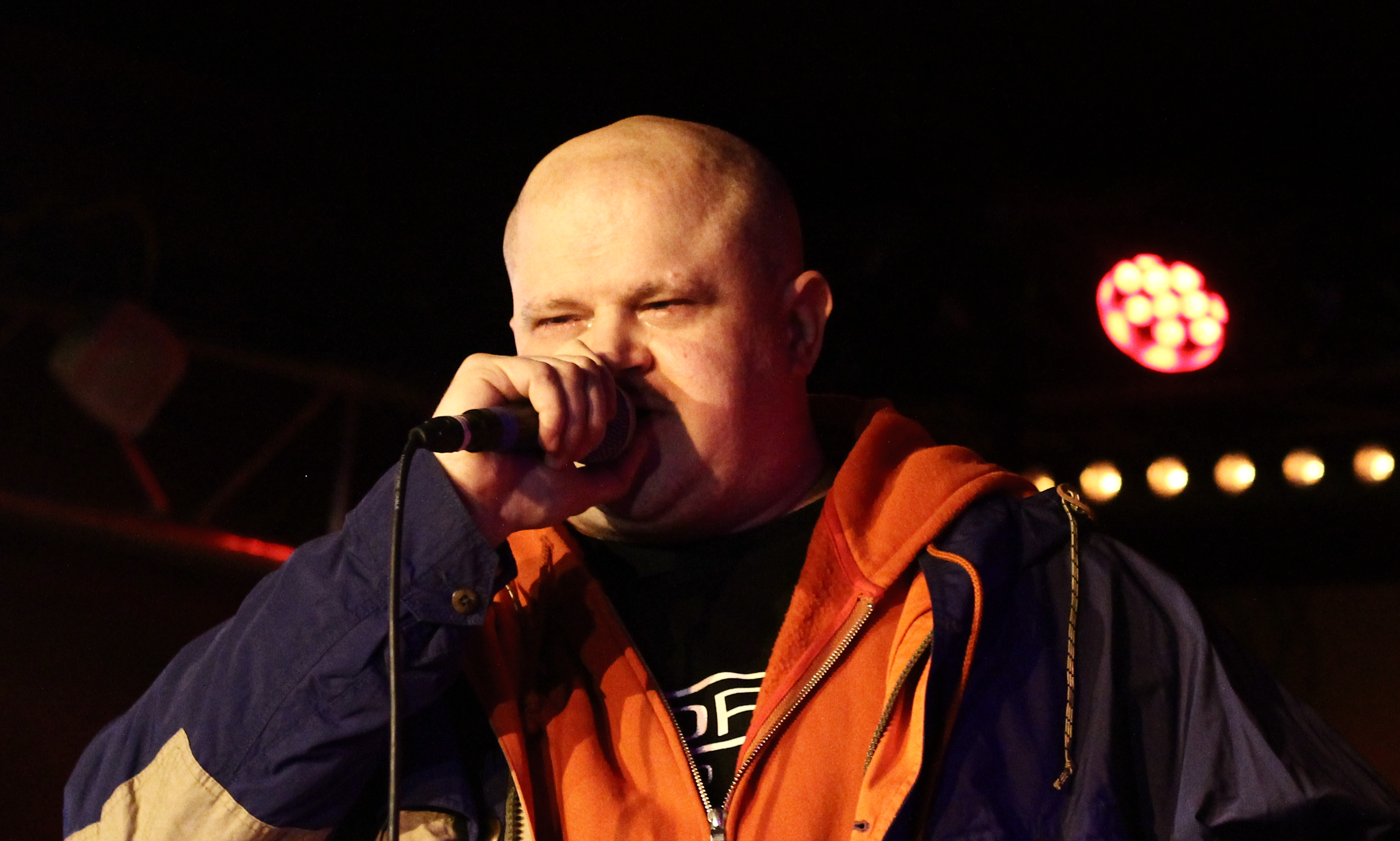
Teki Latex

In France, in 2016, musical artist Teki Latex and various other French record producers introduced a new French club music sound, dubbed "bérite club" blending elements from genres gqom, afro trap, Baltimore house, ballroom house, kuduro and grime.

=== Cruise (Nigerian cruise) ===
In the 2020s, a new musical phenomenon emerged in Nigeria known as Nigerian cruise, also referred to simply as "cruise" or "freebeat". The genre's name was coined by the WhatsApp generation. A typical cruise song encompasses a blend of gqom and amapiano, integrated with elements of techno, melodies with afrobeats influences, sharp percussion, rapid tempo and often vocal samples featuring Nollywood actors, politicians, or snippets from social media and televangelists. Original recordings are often remixed by dancers who accelerate the tempo of the music, filming themselves dancing to the beat, and subsequently sharing these videos on TikTok. In 2022, MOVES Recordings, Cruise, compilation showcased the Nigerian cruise sound. It featured artists DJ Stainless, DJ Elede, DJ Yk Mule (pioneer of Nigerian cruise), DJ West, Fela 2, and DJ OP Dot. Notably, in 2020, "Zazu Beat" by DJ Yk Mule and Portable was released, while "ZaZoo Zehh," released in 2022 by Poco Lee, Portable, YBNL Nation founder and rapper Olamide, made an entry into the Billboard Global 200.

=== Street pop ===
Street pop (also known as street hop) is an experimental vocal-rap musical style, which originated in Lagos, evolving from a fusion of Nigerian hip hop, popular music, Afropop, afrobeats and Nigerian street music. It was influenced by artists like Danfo Drivers, Baba Fryo and Daddy Showkey (known for galala, a dance and music genre derived from the efforts of Nigerian reggae musicians in the 1990s) as well as shaku shaku, originally a Nigerian dance style influenced by gqom, which later evolved into a distinct music genre. Street pop is distinguished by its upbeat tempos and its incorporation of gqom, highlife, pop, hip hop and other EDM elements. Although, street pop songs typically feature a rapid tempo, slower-paced street pop music is also common. It features a fusion of melodious arrangements, urban colloquial language, Pidgin, Yoruba, singing as well as indigenous and Western rap. Lyrically, it frequently explores themes of improvement of quality of life and spiritual devotion across various religions. Variants of street pop are neo-fuji, shaku shaku and zanku. Notable musicians of the street pop genre include Marlian Records label founder and rapper Naira Marley, Slimcase, Mr Real, Olamide, Idowest, Reminisce, Rexxie, Zlatan Ibile (Zanku records), 9ice, Lil Kesh, Zinoleesky, MohBad, T.I Blaze, Poco Lee, Asake, Portable, Bella Shmurda, Balloranking, Seyi Vibez, DJ Kaywise and Sarz.

=== Quantum sound ===
Quantum sound is a taxi-kick influenced genre and it is characterized by its re-editing style. Musicians ascribed to the genre include RealShaunMusiq, Sizwe Nineteen and Nandipha808.

=== UK gqom ===
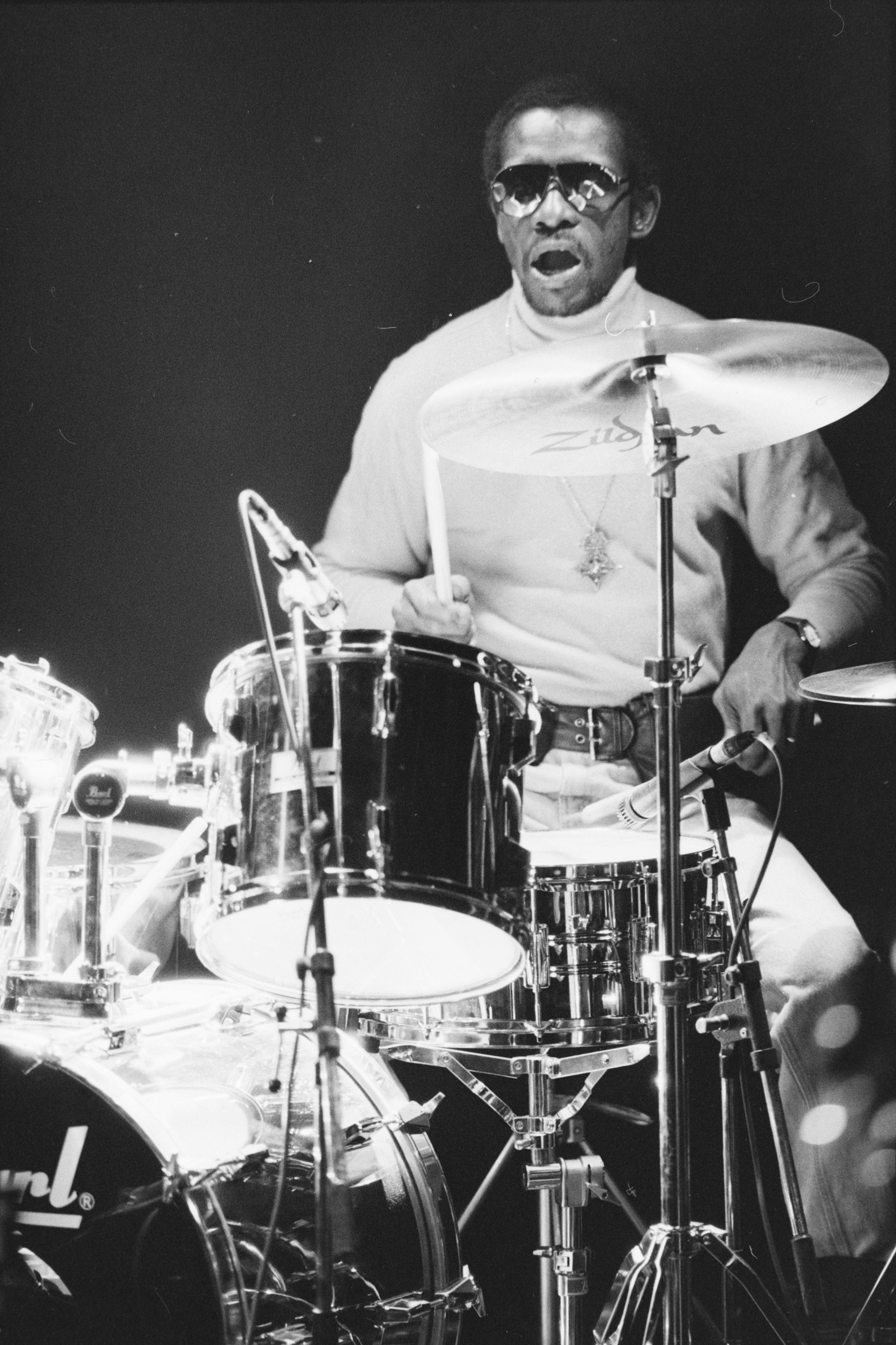
Tony Allen performing in Haarlem, 1988

Scratcha DVA envisioned UK Gqom as a unique offshoot of gqom, influenced by British club culture, particularly the UK funky sound. An illustration of UK gqom is KG & Scratchclart's EP The Classix. Other notable releases include the EPs & Baga Man and Touch by KG & Sctratcha DVA.

Notably musician, Kode9 (Steve Goodman a pioneer of dubstep) as well as head of the electronic music label Hyperdub exhibited a heightened interest in gqom in the mid-2010s. Various British record labels such as Gqom Oh!, Hyperdub and Goon Club All Stars, released gqom records by gqom pioneers and record producers such as Mafia Boyz, Dominowe, Cruel Boyz, Angrypits Fam, DJ Lag, Julz Da Deejay, Formation Boyz, 3D & Untifam, DJ Mabheko, Angelic Fam, Forgotten Souls, Chaostee, Swag Fam, Mosthatedboyz, Untichicks, Formation Chix, TLC Fam, Unticipated Soundz, Emo Kid and Okzharp.

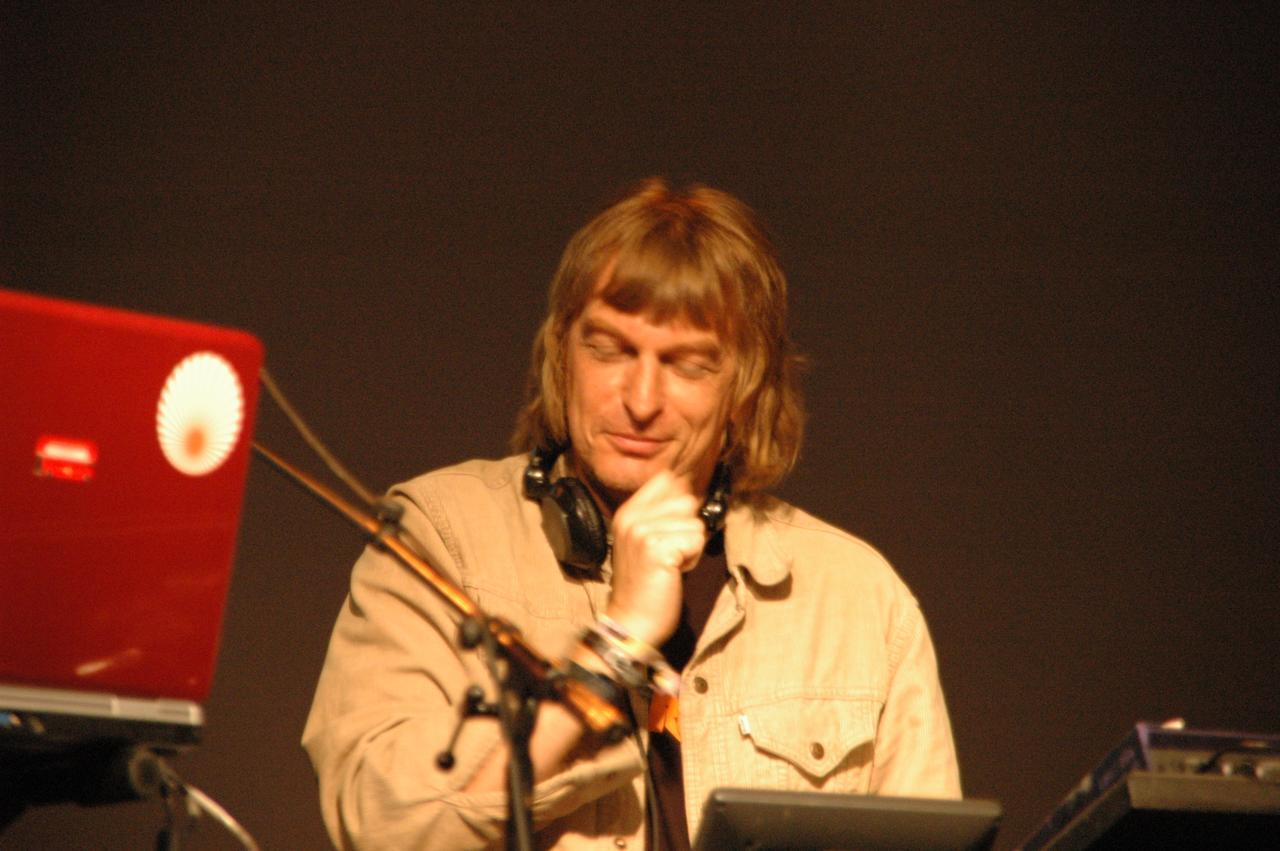
Matt Black

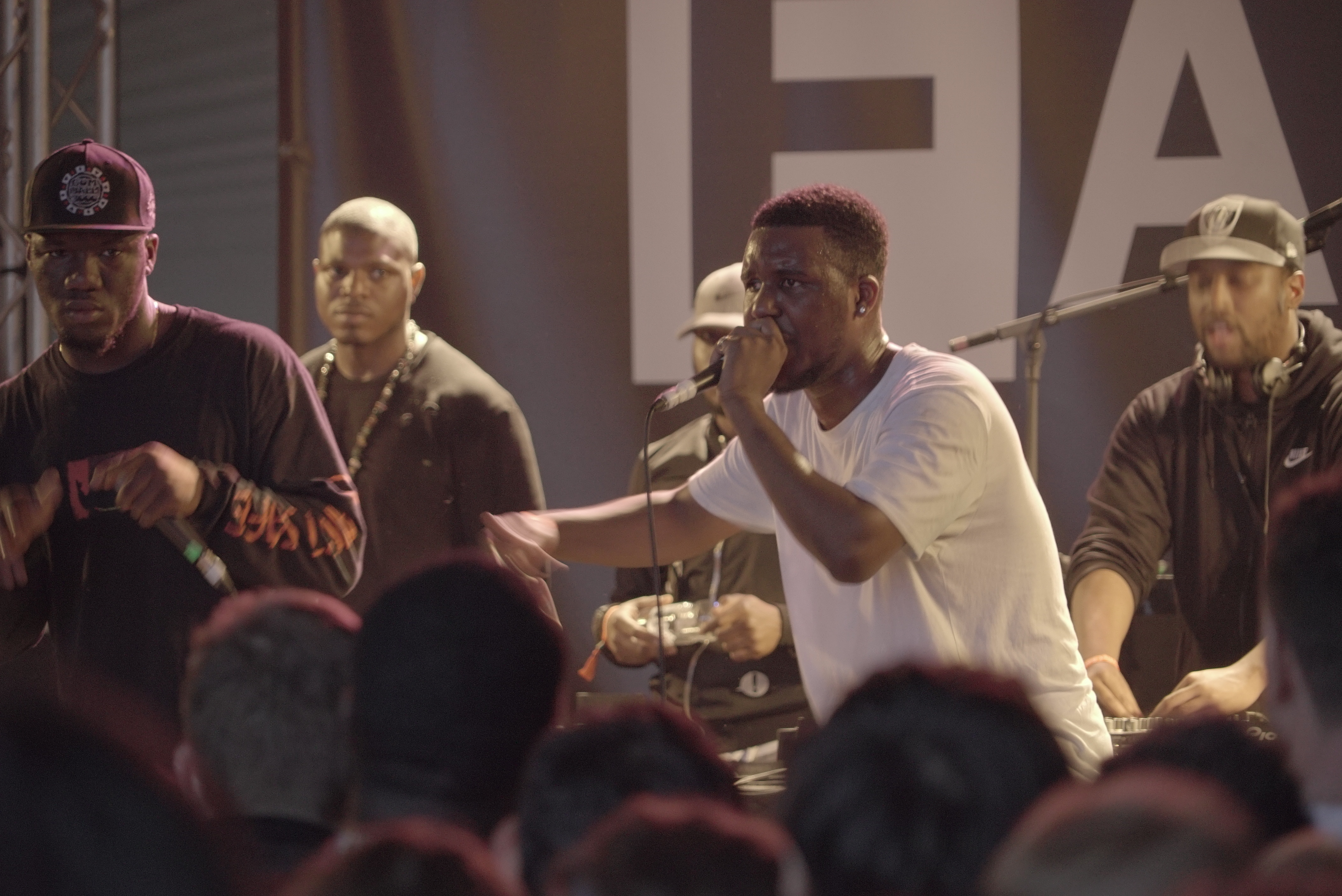
Novelist

In 2020, electronic music duo Coldcut (comprising Matt Black and Jonathan More), the founders of Ninja Tune record label and credited as pioneers of pop sampling, collaborated with South African and Nigerian musicians to produce the album Keleketla! (meaning "response") for the In Place of War charity, organization. The album featured a blend of various styles, incorporating gqom beats and afrobeat percussion by Nigerian-French musician Tony Allen (a pioneer of afrobeat), constructed upon a jazz base. In 2021, Abeka Bugatti, the debut joint EP by Bryte and Mina, showcased five songs infused with elements of gqom, afrobeats, UK funky and dancehall. In 2023, Scratcha had a back-to-back, mixset with gqom pioneer and Durban native Menzi Shabane. DJ Lag collaborated with British grime record producer and MC, Novelist on a single, titled Bulldozer. KG,'s Red EP marked the first release from her imprint label, Rhythm In The City (RITC), and was described as "... an extension of the label boss' production signature that embodies a multitude of styles, UK funky, alté R&B, afro alté, gqom, amapiano, highlife and afrohouse".

== Alternative gqom ==
In 2017, electronic rapper Okmalumkoolkat's "Gqi" alongside Amadando was produced by Rudeboyz (comprising Menchess and Massive Q).

Stiff Pap, a Cape Town-based duo comprising rapper Ayema Probllem and Jakinda, gained recognition with their debut EP Based On a Qho Story. The EP received critical acclaim and comprised a blend of gqom, kwaito, house and industrial music.

Sho Madjozi's Limpopo Champions League album was a mixture of gqom, hip hop, shangaan electro, trap, afrobeats, house, pop, reggae, dancehall, R&B, and EDM. The album featured musical acts such as Makhadzi and rapper Kwesta.

In 2019, DJ Tira's self-produced album, Ikhenani (meaning "Canaan") consisted of a blend of genres gqom, maskandi, gospel, amapiano, trap and hip hop. The album featured several guest appearances including Chymamusique, Duncan, Skye Wanda, Dlala Mshunqisi, Kwesta, Hlengiwe Mhlaba and Tipcee.

"Bum Bum" by El Maestro featuring TP integrated components of afrobeat, gqom, amapiano and ragga.

In 2020, commercial gqom duo Worst Behaviour enlisted Okmalumkoolkat, DJ Tira, rapper Beast RSA, DJ Lag and Tipcee for the remix of their breakout single "Samba Ngolayini". R&B, pop and amapiano singer Tyla, DJ Lag additionally Kooldrink collaborated for song, "Overdue". The song incorporated elements of gqom and popiano.

In 2022, The Natal Piano Movement's gqom album, The Legendary Edition was a fusion of gqom, deep house and amapiano.

Moonchild Sanelly's Phases album inclusive of a guest appearance by Blxckie showcased a mix of kwaito, gqom and amapiano interwoven with constituents of hip hop, jazz, pop, R&B and trap which Sanelly refers to as "future ghetto funk".

=== Australia ===
Rapper Teether and producer Kuya Neil, described their musical style as "future-focused rap" influenced by gqom along with other genres such as bass music and footwork. Teether and Kuya Neil's nine-track album titled, Stressor was released in 2023.

=== Austria ===
In 2024, Franchise released, "Satisfaction".

=== Brazil ===
Brazilian and other producers established a bridge between gqom and baile funk (funk carioca), as seen with examples such as JLZ's GQOM IDEIAS EP and State OFFF's "I Need Some Baile-GQOM", song.

=== Canada ===
In 2021, musical artist Jessy Lanza's contemporary house and techno DJ-Kicks album incorporated elements of gqom, footwork and funk carioca.

=== China ===
In 2019, Chinese DJ and producer Terry Zhong, known for his gqom and afro house style, collaborated with Canadian electronic music record label Monstercat to release his debut song which featured Conro, "Play It Cool".

=== Dominican Republic ===
In the late 2010s, musical artist Kelman Duran explored musical styles originating from the African and Afro-Caribbean diasporas, including gqom, reggaetón, dancehall, kuduro, and hip hop. Duran's 13th Month album encompassed gqom, batida and dembow beat.

=== France ===
The Gqommunion collective was initiated in 2017 by Sebastien Forrester and Amzo, the latter associated with the Gqom Oh!, record label. In 2019, Forrester released the gqom-inspired EP Salvo, which additionally employed coupé-décalé rhythms.

=== Greece ===
In 2020, Greek duo Bang La Decks and Dutch producer Wiwek collaborated on a single titled "GQOM". The duo and producer paid tribute to gqom while expressing their admiration for Guinean vocalist Mory Kanté by incorporating Kanté's vocal from his 1987, single "Yé ké yé ké" into the record's production.

=== India ===
In the 2020s, musician Ravish Momin blended acoustic instruments with mechanical sounds to create a fusion influenced by gqom, kuduro and mahraganat (a type of Egyptian electronic dance music). A notable song, "Song For The Zanzi" paid homage to the Zanzi (or Siddi) people, an African diasporic community.

=== Indonesia ===
In 2024, Bandung DJ and music producer REYY released a song titled, "Tokyo Gqom", a remix of Teriyaki Boyz' 2006 single,"Tokyo Drift (Fast & Furious)".

=== Japan ===
In Japan, a gqom scene emerged, spearheaded by DJ and producer KΣITO, who was initially involved in the Japanese footwork scene. The record producer's interest in gqom grew in the mid-2010s. In 2016, KΣITO released Hatagaya an EP which incorporated gqom. Various other projects by KΣITO, such as Jakuzure Butoh, drew inspiration from gqom music.

Additionally, the producer established the USI KUVO record label, which serves as a hub for the Japanese gqom scene as well as released gqom records by Durban gqom artists such as Loktion Boyz. Some Japanese producers such as Indus Bonze, blend gqom with gorge, an experimental Japanese music style.

=== Mexico ===
In 2021, N.A.A.F.I ( Mexican DJ collective and record label) music producer OMAAR's, Drum Temple album was inspired by gqom among other genres such as UK funky. Single, "Drum Dance" was described as "a rapturous reinterpretation of gqom and techno, at once resembling an ancient ritual and an intense strength-training session" by Isabelia Herrera of Pitchfork.

=== Nigeria ===
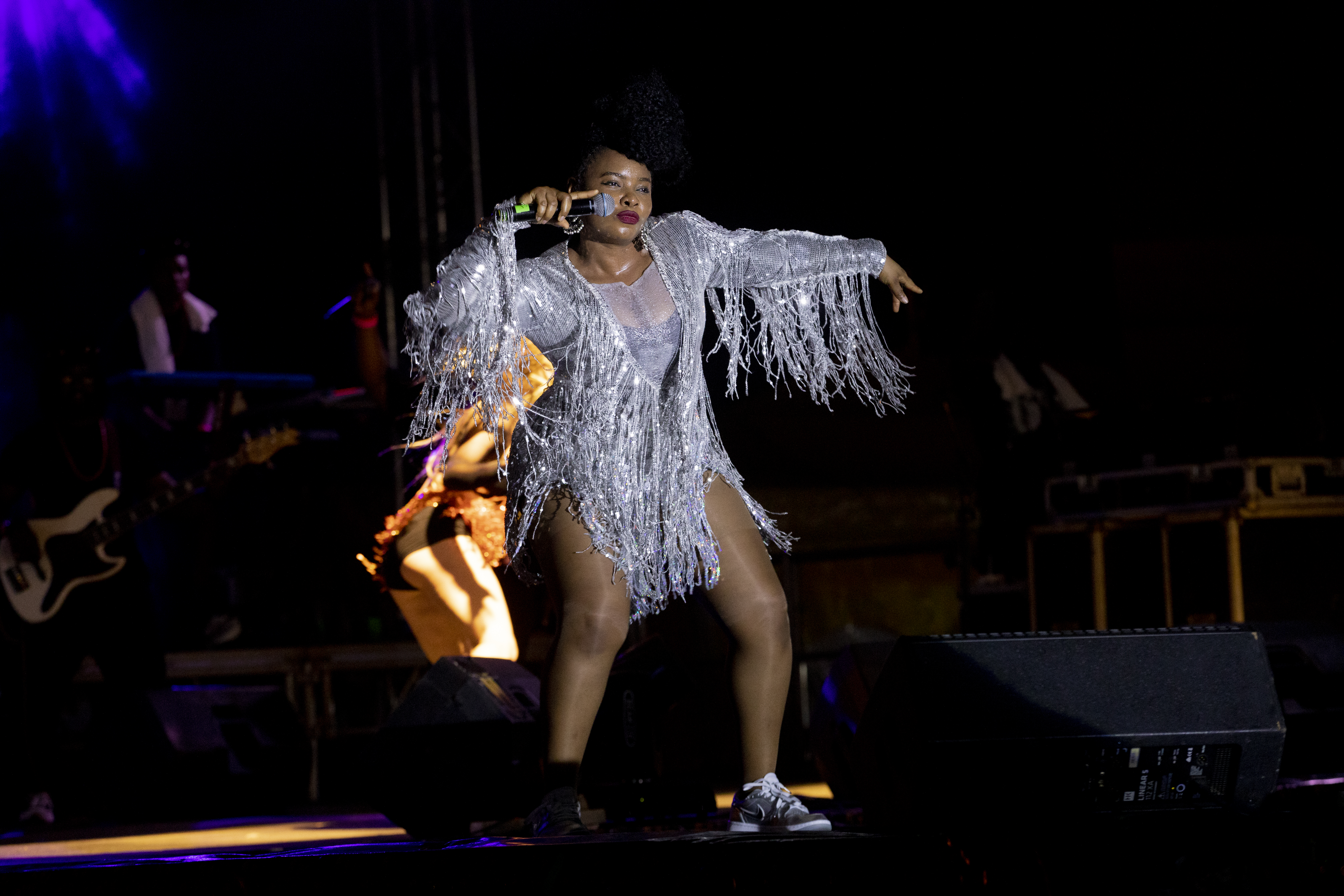
Yemi Alade

Reggae-dancehall musician Patoranking's 2017, released single "Available" fused afrobeats and gqom, the song produced by South African musicians DJ Catzico and Vista was described as "Patoranking proves how powerful gqom can sound in a pop setting" by Mike Steyels writing for Pitchfork. In 2018, Citizen Boy, collaborated with Nigerian singer Dapo Tuburna on the afrobeats and gqom single, "Alala". The song was featured on the B side of Citizen Boy's EP titled, Gqom Fever. "Container" by CKay was a fusion of gqom, jazz, afrobeats and trap. Songwriter and singer Yemi Alade featured on "My Power" in, 2019.

=== South Korea ===
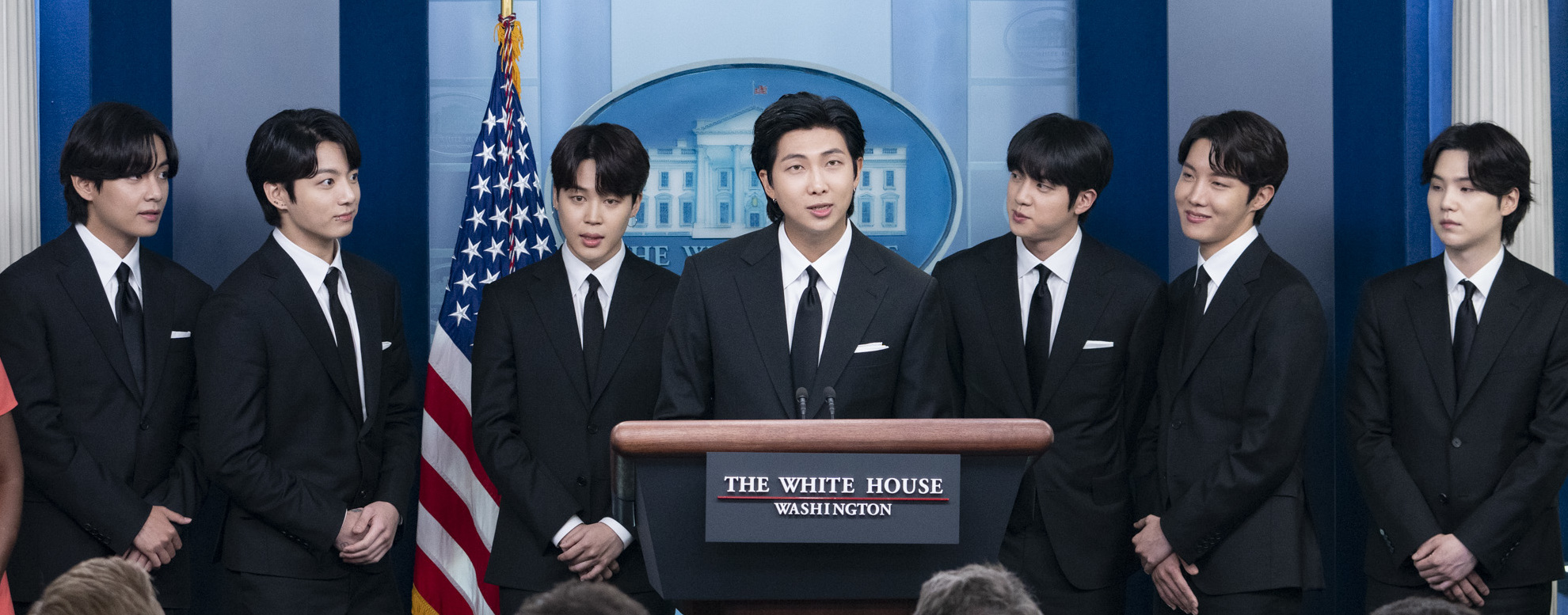
BTS

In 2018, boy band BTS released "Idol" from their Love Yourself: Answer album. The song served as the album's opening track, drawing inspiration from and incorporating gqom rhythmic elements. Moreover, the band promoted an alternate, digital-only version of the song featuring Trinidadian-American rapper and singer, Nicki Minaj. In 2022, gqom trio Phelimuncasi (consisting of Malathon as well as twin vocalists Makan Nana and Khera) enlisted, NET GALA to produce their song "Dlala Ngesinqa".

=== Uganda ===
Ugandan, record label Nyege Nyege Tapes, released gqom records featuring gqom pioneers, gqom record producers and vocalists such as Menzi Shabane, Phelimuncasi, Ugandan DJ Scoturn, DJ Ndakx and DJ Nhlekzin.

=== United States ===
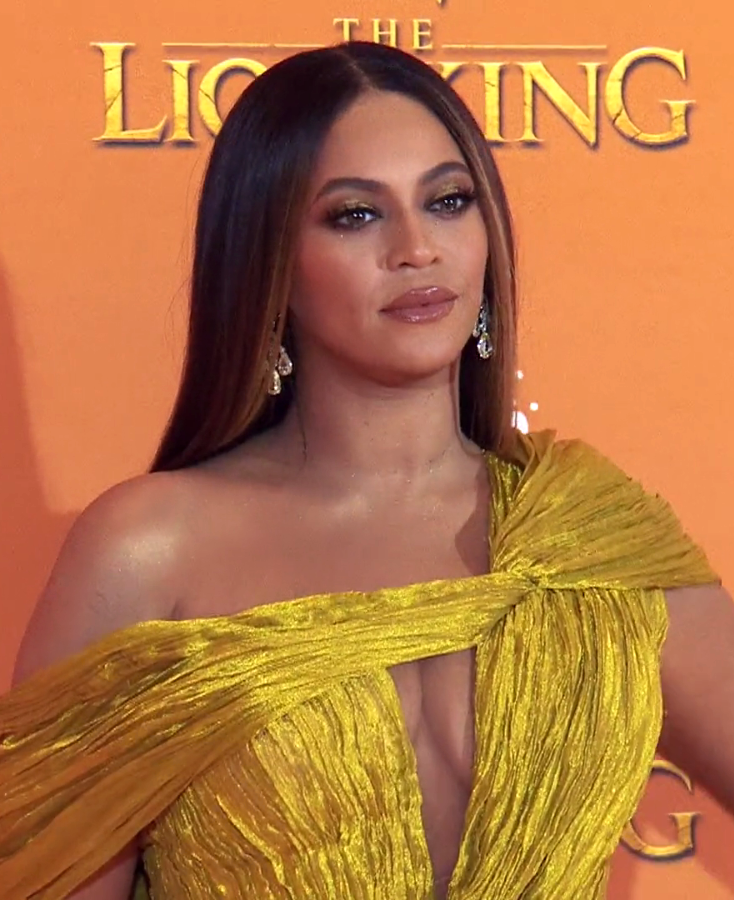
Beyoncé

In 2018, Nicki Minaj collaborated with BTS on "Idol". In 2019, American rapper and singer Tierra Whack and record producer as well as songwriter Nija Charles featured on Beyoncé's "My Power". Beyoncé's, 2022 Renaissance studio album, incorporated gqom among other genres. In March 2024, Skrillex, Ahadadream and Priya Ragu released the track "Taka", which integrated elements of gqom and South Asian music.

=== Zimbabwe ===
In 2017, DJ Tira teamed up with rapper Awa for a single featured on the rapper's debut album, African Women Arise. The song was recorded in Germany. In 2019, house musician DJ Juta and Bhizer, the record producer behind "Gobisiqolo" collaborated for a single titled "Ngiceli Space" which translates to "give us space to shine."

== Gqom dance ==
Gqom music is associated with a number of distinctive dance moves, including gwara gwara, vosho and bhenga.

=== Gwara gwara ===
Rihanna and backup dancers, performing the gwara gwara at the 60th Annual Grammy Awards, 2018

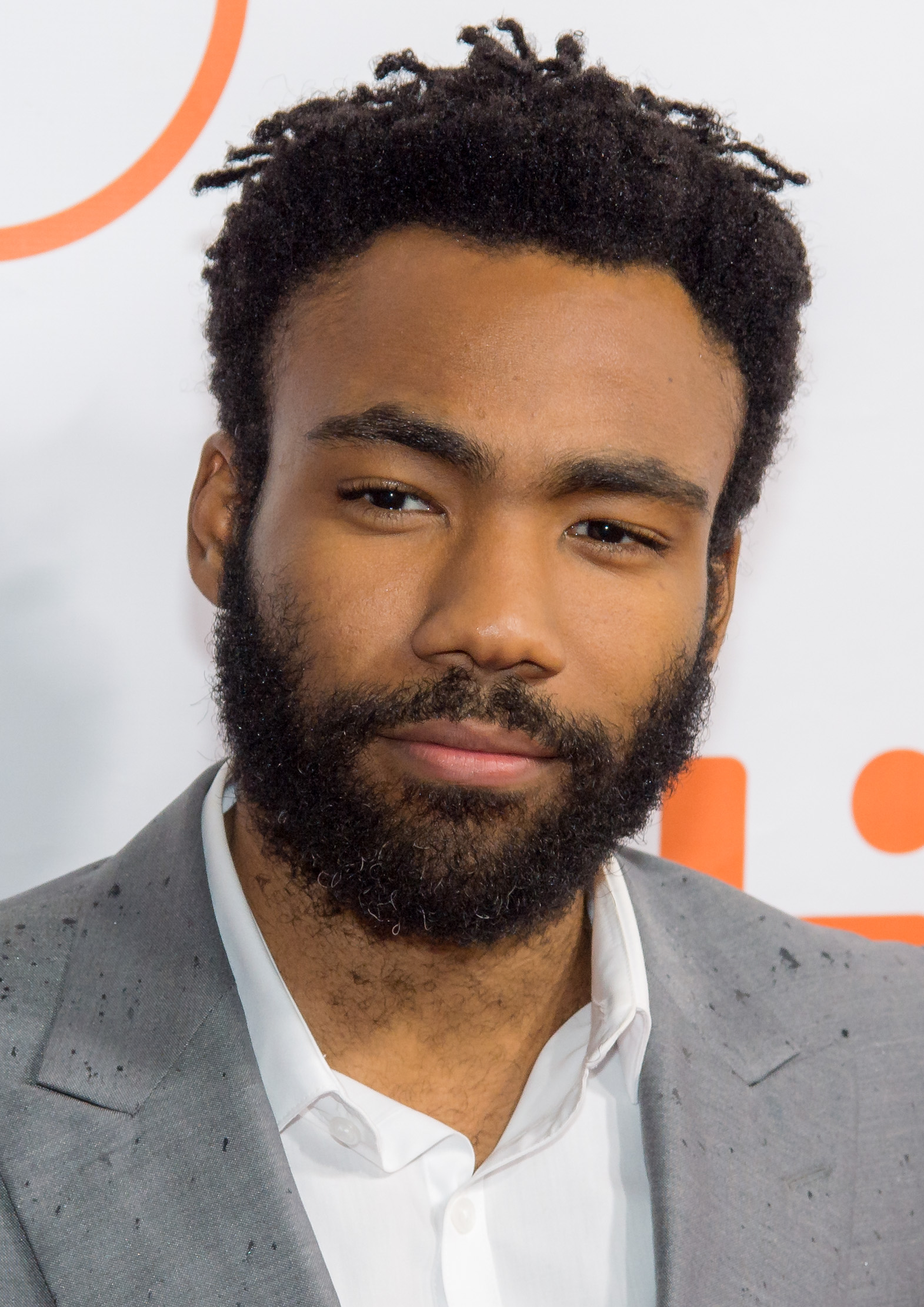
Childish Gambino

Gwara gwara is performed by rolling and swinging the arm and the elbow in terms of making a circle, and one of the leg moves in connection with the arm's rhythm. It appears to have some similarities to the stanky legg, however it is distinct from it. Gwara gwara was made famous by South Africans DJ Bongz and musician Babes Wodumo. The dance move was created by disc jockey and producer DJ Bongz, and was heavily performed and popularized in the mid-2010s. It also received widespread popularity globally as the choreography was adopted by notable musicians such as Rihanna, who performed the dance move while performing "Wild Thoughts" at the 60th Annual Grammy Awards in 2018. Childish Gambino performed the dance in the video of his song "This Is America". BTS performed the dance in the choreography for their song "Idol".

== See also ==
- Azonto
- Afro fusion
- Bongo Flava
- Jaiva
- List of musical genres of the African diaspora
- Triple step
- Triple step (music)
- Tsapiky
- Singeli
