= Four on the floor (music) =

Rhythm used in contemporary music

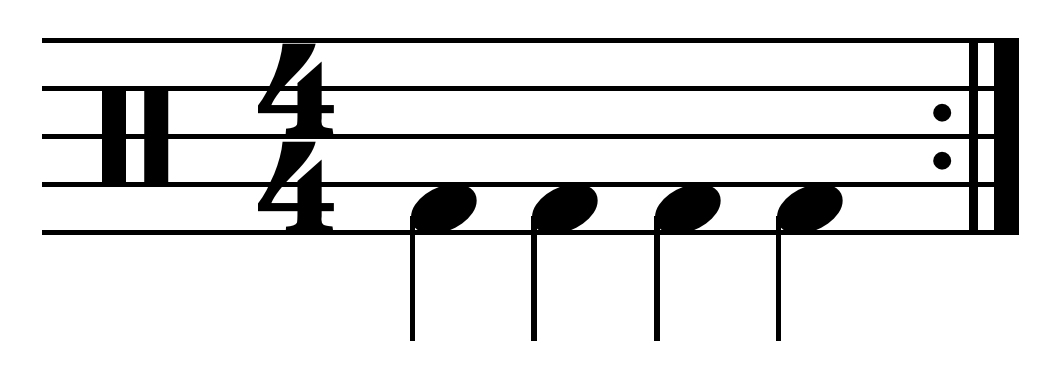
"Four on the floor" on the bass drum and

Four-on-the-floor (or four-to-the-floor) is a rhythm used primarily in dance genres such as disco and electronic dance music. It is a steady, uniformly accented beat in 4/4 time in which the bass drum is hit on every beat (1, 2, 3, 4). This was popularized in the disco music of the 1970s and the term four-on-the-floor was widely used in that era, since on a drum set, the beat is played with the pedal-operated, drum-kit bass drum.

Four on the floor was common in jazz drumming until bebop styles expanded rhythmic roles beyond the basics in the 1940s. Garage rock bands of the 1960s such as the Troggs and the Seeds used four-on-the-floor on some of their hits.

Many styles of electronic dance music use this beat as an important part of the rhythmic structure. Sometimes the term is used to refer to a 4/4 uniform drumming pattern for any drum.

A form of four-on-the-floor is also used in jazz drumming. Instead of hitting the bass drum in a pronounced and therefore easily audible fashion, it is usually struck very lightly (referred to as "feathering") so that the sound of the drum is felt instead of heard by the listener. Typically, this is combined with a ride cymbal and hi-hat in syncopation. When a string instrument makes the rhythm (rhythm guitar, banjo), all four beats of the measure are played by identical downstrokes.

In reggae drumming, the bass drum usually hits on the third beat but sometimes drummers play four on the floor. Sly Dunbar from Sly and Robbie was one of the reggae drummers who played mostly in this style. Carlton Barrett from Bob Marley and the Wailers played four on the floor on several hits by the Wailers like "Is This Love" and "Exodus". In reggae, four on the floor usually goes by the hand with a low end and powerful bassline. Four on the floor can be found in more modern reggae derivative styles such as dancehall, while it is less common to find it in roots reggae. In the roots context, it is generally referred to as a "steppers" rhythm.

== Stylistic differences ==
=== In South African music ===
Sgubhu, a variant of gqom and a type of South African electronic dance music, shares some traits with gqom but sets itself apart with its beat structure. Unlike standard gqom, sgubhu is characterized by a much steadier kick drum pattern although having a kick pattern reminiscent of the three-step rhythm, often adhering to a consistent four-on-the-floor rhythm, which aligns more closely with traditional four-on-the-floor electronic dance music. There were several pioneers of the sgubhu genre, including record producer Emo Kid.
