= Distruction Boyz =

South African gqom music duo

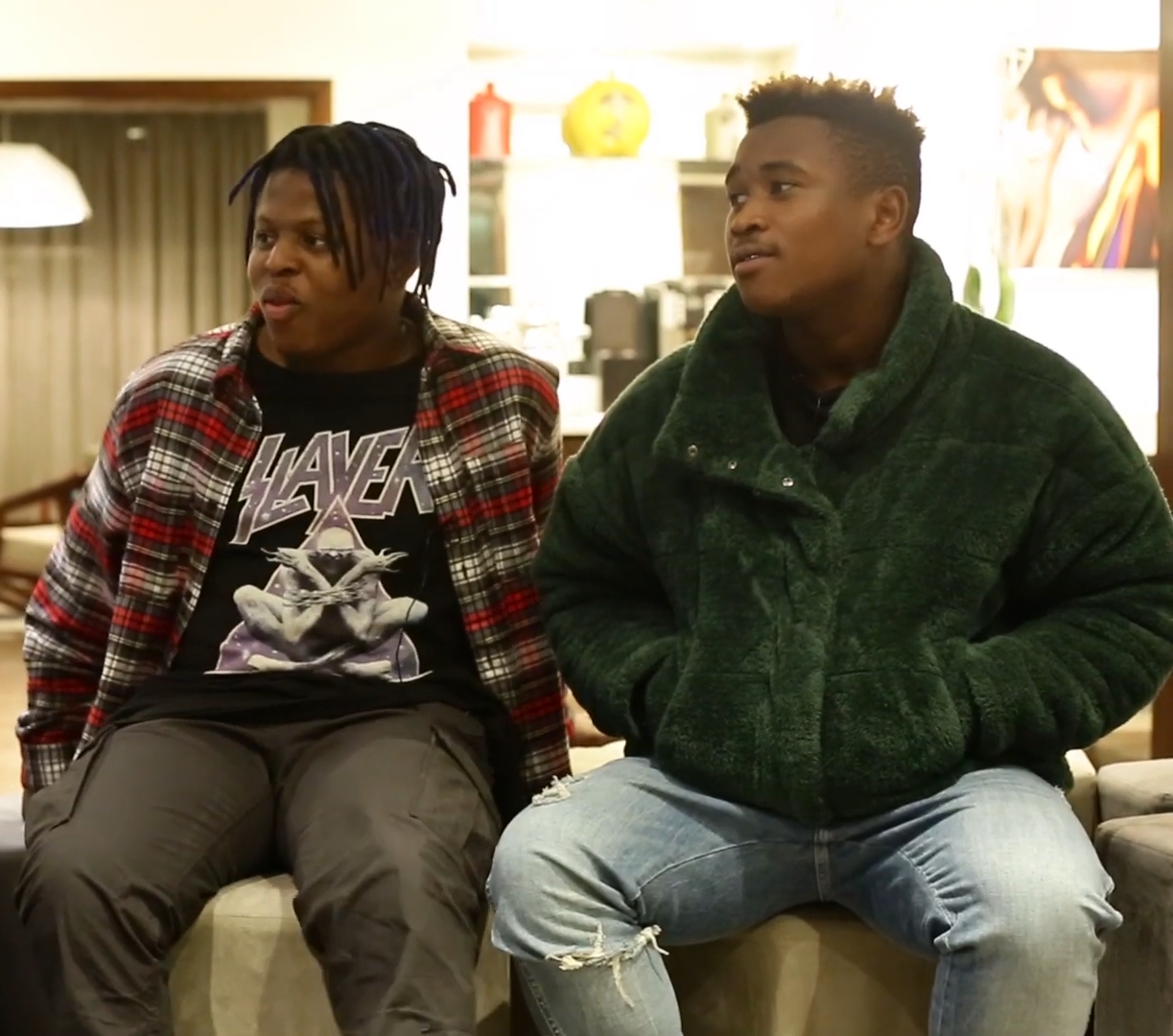
- Distruction Boyz during a 2018 interview

Background information
- Origin: Durban, South Africa
- Genre: Gqom
- Years active: 2015–present
- Label: Distruction Boyz Records
- Members: Thobani “Que” Mgobhozi; Zipho “Goldmax” Mthembu

Distruction Boyz is a Gqom music duo from Durban, South Africa which consists of recording artists and record producers Thobani “Que” Mgobhozi and Zipho “Goldmax” Mthembu. Their debut album Gqom Is the Future was certified gold by RISA.

== Early life ==
Goldmax and Que were born in KwaMashu, the second biggest township in Durban. They established themselves by jamming to their own gqom and house sets at local taverns and shisa nyama's in and around KwaMashu. Having run into each other a lot and appreciated each other's playing styles at these kinds of local gigs, they then decided to merge their skills and form Distruction Boyz.

== Career ==
Distruction Boyz released their breakout single titled "Omunye" which features Benny Maverick & Dladla Mshunqisi. The song was certified gold by the Recording Industry of South Africa. The duo then released their debut studio album titled, Gqom Is The Future on October 20, 2017, which was certified gold by RiSA on December 18, 2017. At the 2018 Dstv Mzansi Viewers Choice Awards the duo was nominated for Favourite Music Artist/Group. On November 1, 2019, they released a single "Nevermind" featuring Zhao. In 2023, Distruction Boyz announced a temporary split to briefly focus on and hone their solo careers.

== Discography ==
=== Singles ===
Pakisha

=== As lead artists ===
List of singles as lead artists, with selected chart positions and certifications, showing year released and album name
Title	Year	Peak chart positions	Certification	Album
Title	Year	South Africa (EMA)	Certification	Album
"Ngoma Yam’" (featuring Danger & Efelow)	2016	—		Non-album singles
"Madness" (featuring Tipcee)	2017	—		Non-album singles
"Shut Up & Groove" (featuring Babes Wodumo & Mampintsha)	2017	—		Non-album singles
"Omunye" (featuring Benny Maverick & Dladla Mshunqisi)	2017	1	RiSA: Gold	Gqom Is The Future
"—" denotes a recording that did not chart or was not released in that territory.

=== Studio albums ===
List of studio albums, with selected information
Title	Album details	Certification
Gqom Is The Future	Released: 20 October 2017; Label: Distruction Boyz Records; Formats: CD, Digital download	RiSA: Gold
It Was All A Dream	Released: 19 October 2018; Label: Distruction Boyz Records; Formats: CD, Digital download	

== Production discography ==
=== Singles produced ===
Year	Title	Artist	Album
2016	"Wololo"	Babes Wodumo (featuring Mampintsha)	Gqom Queen, Vol. 1
2017	"Shut Up & Groove"	Distruction Boyz (featuring Babes Wodumo & Mampintsha)	Non-album singles
2017	"Midnight Starring"	DJ Maphorisa (featuring DJ Tira, Busiswa & Moonchild)	Non-album singles
2017	"Omunye"	Distruction Boyz (featuring Benny Maverick & Dladla Mshunqisi)	Gqom Is The Future
2018	"Pakisha"	Dladla Mshunqisi (featuring Dj Tira & Distruction Boyz)	Non-album single

== Awards and nominations ==
Distruction Boyz awards and nominations
Awards and nominations
Award	Wins	Nominations
South African Music Awards	1	1
Soundcity MVP Awards Festival	1	1
BET Awards	0	1
Namibia Annual Music Awards	1	1
MTV European Music Awards	0	1
Dstv Mzansi Viewers Choice Awards	0	1

Totals (Note: Certain award groups do not simply award one winner. They acknowledge several different recipients, have runners-up, and have third place. Since this is a specific recognition and is different from losing an award, runner-up mentions are considered wins in this award tally. For simplification and to avoid errors, each award in this list has been presumed to have had a prior nomination.)
- Wins: 3
- Nominations: 6

=== South African Music Awards ===
Year	Nominee / work	Award	Result
2017	Distruction Boys - Wololo (Dbanj Remix)	Remix of the Year	Nominated
2018	Distruction Boys - Omunye	Record of the Year	Won

=== Soundcity MVP Awards Festival ===
Year	Nominee / work	Award	Result
2018	Themselves	Best Group/Duo	Won

=== BET Awards Festival ===
Year	Nominee / work	Award	Result
2018	Themselves	Best International Act	Nominated

=== Dstv Mzansi Viewers Choice Awards ===
Year	Nominee / work	Award	Result
2018	"Omunye"	Favourite Song Of the Year	Nominated
