= Babes Wodumo =

South African singer and choreographer

- Born: Bongekile Mildred Simelane; March 25, 1994 (age 32); Durban, South Africa
- Genres: Gqom
- Occupations: singer; songwriter; dancer; choreographer
- Years active: 2016–present
- Labels: West Ink; Afrotainment

Bongekile Mildred Simelane (born 25 March 1994) prominently known as Babes Wodumo (also gqom queen), is a South African singer-songwriter and choreographer. She rose to fame following the release of her debut album Gqom Queen, Vol. 1 (2016) and furthermore subsequently being nominated at the MTV Europe Music Award for Best African Act.

Babes Wodumo is a part of the music connoisseurs who were pivotal in influencing the gqom genre's international acclaim. She appeared on the Black Panther: The Album compilation by Kendrick Lamar on a song titled "Redemption". In 2017, Wodumo was nominated for the BET Award for Best International Act: Africa. In July 2020, she released her second album Idando Kazi which included the hit song,"eLamont" featuring Mampintsha (former Big Nuz member) as well as Skillz.

== Life and career ==
=== 1994-2013: Early childhood ===
Bongekile Mildred Simelane was born in March 25, 1994 in Lamontville, Durban. Her father Welcome Simelane is a Bishop.

=== 2014-2019: Career beginnings, breakthrough, Black Panther ===
She released her first song titled "Desha" produced by Sir Bubzin, In 2014. After she signed a record deal with West Ink, one of her hit singles "Wololo" featuring Mampintsha was released in December 2015 in South Africa. The song earned her a nomination for Best Breakthrough Artist and Song of the Year at MTV Africa Music Awards.

Her debut gqom studio album Gqom Queen Vol. 1 proceeded with three singles "Wololo", "Umgan Wami" and "Mercedes". Upon its release the song surpassed 28 million streams and debuted at number 3 on iTunes charts. The album was certified platinum by the South African record industry trade association (RISA).

Subsequently she was featured on the Black Panther(soundtrack) compilation by Kendrick Lamar.

=== 2020-present: Idando Kazi ===
In July of year 2020, she released her sophomore studio album Idando Kazi via West Ink Records featuring Mampintsha, Skillz, T.N.S, Madanon, Worst Behavior and many others. "eLamont" was released as the lead single of the album which debuted at number 3 on the South African iTunes charts.

The album was nominated at the 27th South African Music Awards. In 2021 herself and her husband premiered their reality TV show Uthando Lodumo which aired on Showmax.

== Personal life ==
=== Domestic violence case ===
In 2019, reports surfaced that Wodumo's boyfriend and manager Mandla "Mampintsha" Maphumulo had physically assaulted her. Wodumo broadcast the incident on Instagram Live. Mampintsha was arrested on suspicion of assault. Even though the relationship between the two had appeared to be over, both parties agreed to counselling and reconciled and later on appeared to be on good terms. Mampintsha later on featured on her second album, Idando Kazi.

=== Marriage and children ===
Babes Wodumo married Mandla Maphumulo in 2020. In 2021 they had their first child. Her husband and long-time collaboration partner later died in December 2022, as reported due to a stroke.

=== SAMAs ===
In 2017, Wodumo was the most nominated artist at the 23rd South African Music Awards. However, she did not win any award, and this led to an altercation after the singer accused the personnel from the SAMA 23 of buying awards.

== Discography ==
=== Studio albums ===
- Gqom Queen Vol.1
- Indando Kazi
- Mabhesingo

List of studio albums
| Title | Album details | Certification |
|---|---|---|
| Gqom Queen Vol.1 | Released: 2016; Format: Digital download, CD, streaming | RiSA: Gold |
| Indando Kazi | Released: 2020; Format: Digital download, CD, streaming | |

=== Singles ===
| Artist | Featuring | Title |
|---|---|---|
| Babes Wodumo | featuring Mampintsha and Sklliz | eLamont |
| Babes Wodumo | featuring Mampintsha, TNS and Skillz | Abadala |
| Babes Wodumo | featuring Rhythm Soundz, Dladla Mshunqisi and Tipcee | Angeke |
| Babes Wodumo | featuring Mampintsha and Worst Behavior | Corona |
| Babes Wodumo | featuring Mampintsha and Drega | Dankie Jack |
| Babes Wodumo | featuring Mampintsha, Madanon and Drega | Intombi Yesgebengu |
| Babes Wodumo | featuring Mampintsha, RockBoy, Cultivated Soulz and Sizwe Mdlalose | Izitha |
| Babes Wodumo | feat. Native Life, Madanon and Mampintsha | Levels |
| Babes Wodumo | featuring Drega and Sizwe Mdlalos | MaTen Ten |
| Babes Wodumo | featuring RockBoy, Madanon and Benzy | Umzimba |
| Babes Wodumo | featuring RockBoy, Madanon and Benzy | Umzimba |
| Babes Wodumo | featuring RockBoy, Madanon and Benzy | Umzimba |
| Babes Wodumo | featuring Newlandz Finest | Ungangyeki |

== Awards and nominations ==
| Year | Nominee / work | Award | Result |
|---|---|---|---|
| 16th Metro FM Music Awards | Gqom Queen Vol.1 | Best Dance Album | Nominated |
| 16th Metro FM Music Awards | Gqom Queen Vol.1 | Best Female Album | Nominated |
| 16th Metro FM Music Awards | Wololo (feat. Mampintsha & Distruction Boyz | Song Of The Year) | Nominated |
| 23rd South African Music Awards | Herself | Newcomer Of The Year | Nominated |
| 23rd South African Music Awards | Female Artist Of The Year | Herself | Nominated |
| 23rd South African Music Awards | Wololo (feat. Mampintsha & Distruction Boyz) | Record Of The Year | Nominated |
| 23rd South African Music Awards | Gqom Queen Vol.1 | Album of the Year | Nominated |
| 23rd South African Music Awards | Female Artist Of The Year | Herself | Nominated |
| MTV Africa Music Awards 2016 | Song Of The Year | Wololo (feat. Mampintsha and Distruction Boyz) | Nominated |
| BET Awards 2017 | Herself | Best International Act: Africa | Nominated |
| Dance Music Awards 2017 | Gqom Queen Vol.1 | Best Dance Female Artist | Won |
| 2017MTV EMA | Herself | Best African Act | Nominated |
| All African Music Awards 2018 | Herself | Best Female Artiste in Southern Africa | Nominated |
| South African Gqom Awards 2019 | Ka Dazz | Song Of The Year | Nominated |
| South African Gqom Awards 2019 | Herself | Best Female | Won |
| South African Gqom Awards 2019 | Ka Dazz | Best Music Video | Nominated |
| South African Gqom Awards 2019 | Ka Dazz | Best Music Video Director | Nominated |
| 27th South African Music Awards | Idando Kazi | Best Gqom Album | Nominated |
