= Sabela =

South African linguistic register

- Pronunciation: Afrikaans pronunciation: [sabɛilɑː]
- Created by: –
- Setting and usage: South Africa
- Purpose: Communication between inmates

Language codes
- ISO 639-3: –

Sabela is a covert communication dialect of several major South African languages formed by the Numbers gang. Sabela was originally developed in the mines during the early 1900's as a means of communication between the members of The Numbers Gang but as the gang's influence grew in various South African prisons, the language became eminent in prison and since then, released inmates have introduced it to the general populace of South Africa. UkuSabela means to respond in various Nguni languages.

== Structure ==
Sabela inherits most of its vocabulary, phonology, and syntax from Xhosa and Zulu. Due to the Xhosa and Zulu influence, Sabela contains click consonants.

== Words in Sabela ==
Examples of Words in Sabela
Sabela	IPA	English Literal Translation	Meaning	
Phakamisa	[pəkəmisə]	Confirmation / Agreement	Used to show general approval or interest	
Baitela	[bəitelə]	Gangster	To leave something	To leave a situation or an item
Biteeza	[bajtizʌ]	Food	Food	
Chise	[tʃajs]	Receive or to get / speak to someone	Any situation in which one needs to get something	
Lyn	[līn]	Line	To go somewhere	
Skrif	[skrɪf]	Writing	An item that is significant or important	
Nombor	[nomɘr]	Number	In agreement in respect to the laws and ethics of the number. An object or situation of importance. (Direct allusion to The Numbers Gang)	
Skombizo	[skɘmbizo]	Gangster	"A member of the 27 number gang"	
Hom	[hom]	Gangster	To make you aware	

== In popular culture ==
=== Die Antwoord ===
Sabela is often used by groups associated with the Zef movement, such as Die Antwoord. The group's 2019 gqom single "Baita Jou Sabela" (featuring Slagysta) contains lyrics partially written in Sabela that talk about the South African prison system. The song's music video showcases the corruption present in the South African prison system.
