= BET Award for Best International Act: Africa =

American entertainment award category

BET Awards for Best International Act: Africa
- Awarded for: Wizkid
- Country: United States
- Presented by: BET Awards
- First award: 2010
- Currently held by: Wizkid (2017)

Highlights
- Most wins: Wizkid (2)
- Most nominations: Wizkid (4)

The BET Award for Best International Act: Africa was an award given to honor the outstanding achievements of international artists from Africa every year before being combined with other BET Award international acts. Wizkid holds the record for most wins in this category.

In 2015, several African and UK artists criticized BET's treatment of them, saying that their awards were presented to them in a pre-recorded segment backstage. Nigerian popstar Yemi Alade called for an end to the category. BET's Rights & Research Administrator for Business & Legal Affairs, Lilian Blankson, responded to the criticism in a series of tweets, denying that the award was given out backstage in a pre-recorded segment.

== Winners and nominees ==
Winners are listed first and highlighted in bold.

=== 2010s ===
Best International Act
- **Dizzee Rascal** (UK) - Winner
  - Kojo Antwi (Ghana)
  - Chipmunk (UK)
  - Estelle (UK)
  - Hip Hop Pantsula(HHP) (South Africa)
  - K'NAAN(Somalia/Canada)
  - M.I (Nigeria)
  - P-Square(Nigeria)
  - Corinne Bailey Rae (UK)
  - Sade (UK)

Year	Artist	Country	Ref
2011
2011	**2face Idibia**	**Nigeria**	
2011	**D'banj**	**Nigeria**	
2011	D-Black	Ghana	
2011	Fally Ipupa	DR Congo	
2011	Angélique Kidjo	Benin	
2011	Teargas	South Africa	
2012
2012	**Sarkodie**	**Ghana**	
2012	**Wizkid**	**Nigeria**	
2012	Camp Mulla	Kenya	
2012	Ice Prince	Nigeria	
2012	Lira	South Africa	
2012	Mokobé	Mali	
2013
2013	**Ice Prince**	**Nigeria**	
2013	2face Idibia	Nigeria	
2013	Toya Delazy	South Africa	
2013	Donald	South Africa	
2013	Goodlyfe Crew	Uganda	
2013	R2Bees	Ghana	
2014
2014	**Davido**	**Nigeria**	
2014	Diamond Platnumz	Tanzania	
2014	Mafikizolo	South Africa	
2014	Sarkodie	Ghana	
2014	Tiwa Savage	Nigeria	
2014	Toofan	Togo	
2015
2015	**Stonebwoy**	**Ghana**	
2015	AKA	South Africa	
2015	Yemi Alade	Nigeria	
2015	Fally Ipupa	DR Congo	
2015	Sarkodie	Ghana	
2015	Sauti Sol	Kenya	
2015	The Soil	South Africa	
2015	Wizkid	Nigeria	
2016
2016	**Black Coffee**	**South Africa**	
2016	AKA	South Africa	
2016	Yemi Alade	Nigeria	
2016	Serge Beynaud	Ivory Coast	
2016	MzVee	Ghana	
2016	Cassper Nyovest	South Africa	
2016	Diamond Platnumz	Tanzania	
2016	Wizkid	Nigeria	
2017
2017	**Wizkid**	**Nigeria**	
2017	AKA	South Africa	
2017	Davido	Nigeria	
2017	Mr Eazi	Ghana	
2017	Nasty C	South Africa	
2017	Stonebwoy	Ghana	
2017	Tekno	Nigeria	
2017	Babes Wodumo	South Africa	

== Multiple wins and nominations ==
=== Most Wins ===
2 wins

- Wizkid

=== Nominations ===
4 nominations

- Wizkid
- Sarkodie

3 nominations

- AKA

2 nominations

- Yemi Alade
- Davido
- Ice Prince
- Fally Ipupa
- Diamond Platnumz
- Stonebwoy

== See also ==
- BET Award for Best International Act: UK
