= Tambin =

Type of flute

The tambin (also sereendu, fulannu or Fula flute) is a diagonal diatonic flute without a bell, made from a conical vine, with three finger-holes and a rectangular embouchure with two wings on either side. It is considered the national instrument of the Fula people of West Africa and is similar in its sound and quality to the Middle Eastern ney. The flute has a two and a half octave range, achieved by overblowing to different overtones. It is traditionally tuned to an approximately equidistant heptatonic scale. Players often employ a technique of singing alternately or simultaneously to blown notes. The flute was used in the 2018 Marvel movie Black Panther.
