= Big Nuz =

South African musical trio

- Origin: Durban
- Genres: kwaito
- Years active: 2002–2022
- Labels: Gallo Records; Afrotaiment
- Past members: Danger; R.Mashesha; Mampintsha

Big Nuz was a South African Kwaito trio from Durban, KwaZulu-Natal, founded in 2002. The group was composed of three members known by their stage names Mampintsha, R Mashesha, and Danger.

== History ==
=== 2003–2006: Early years ===
The founding members grew up together in the township of Umlazi. The naming of the group was inspired by "NUZ", which is the number plate or licence plate prefix for all vehicles registered in Umlazi. The group consisted of three members: Mandla Maphumulo (a.k.a. Mampintsha) deceased [2022.12.24], Mzi (a.k.a. Danger) and Sbu (a.k.a. Mashesha) deceased [2015] and was formed in 2002 when they moved from Durban to Johannesburg to secure a recording contract. In 2002, they performed a jingle Backstage on e.tv. With little success in securing a recording contract, the group collaborated with Koloi Lebone and Beatmaker recording songs that have not been released. In 2004, another collaboration with Kwaito artist Ishmael featured them in the song "Boom Boom". In 2006, the group secured a recording contract with Gallo Records and released their debut album titled Zozo in collaboration with Kid Mokoena of Why Not Entertainment. The album did poorly and Gallo Records was criticised for poor management.

=== (2007–2008): 2nd round Knockout ===
In 2007, the group returned to Durban to work with DJ Tira to record and release the track "Uyoysholo Wena". In 2008, the group signed with the Afrotainment recording label and released their second studio album 2nd Round Knockout. The album was a commercial success selling over 20,000 copies in South Africa with the single "Ubala" seeing substantially more airtime. The track was nominated for Song of The Year at the 2008 South African Music Awards where the group also performed during the opening ceremonies. In 2008, "2nd Round Knockout" won the Metro FM Best Kwaito Award and was nominated at the 2008 Channel O Awards. The group continued to work on other projects such as the theme songs for KZN Department of transport and Nedbank Cup. In 2009, they performed at President Jacob Zuma's Inauguration.

=== (2009–2010): Undisputed ===
In the winter of 2009 the group returned to the studio to record their third studio album titled Undisputed, in collaboration with DJ Fisherman and DJ Tira. The album features the song "Umlilo" which received the Song of The Year Award from the South African Music Awards. The album also received the award for best album. Other hit singles included "Newlands West" and "Siyagijima". The album went Platinum.

=== (2011–2012): Pound For Pound ===
In August 2011, the group released their fourth studio album Pound for Pound. The album is a two disc album with 25 songs. The album sold over 40,000 copies and was certified platinum by the Recording Industry of South Africa (RISA). In 2012 "Pound for Pound" received The Best Kwaito Album Award at the South African Music Awards. Hit singles included "Sting Ray", "Ntombenhle", "Serious" and "Emahlanyeni".

=== (2013–2014): Made in Africa ===
Made in Africa was the group's fifth album and was released on 12 July 2013. It features the singles "Hawaii", "Inazo" and "Incwadi Yothando". The album received the Best Kwaito Award from the South African Music Awards. Big Nuz performed the single "Inazo" at the 2014 MTV Africa Music Awards along with a guest appearance by Dj Tira. Made in Africa reached Platinum with over 40,000 copies sold.

=== (2015–2017): For The Fans ===
For The Fans was released in 2015 and features the singles "Osisi Bendawo", "Do You Still Remember", "Phaqa" and "Tsege Tsege". On Friday 7 August, founding member R. Mashesha died at the age of 34 due to surgical complications relating to an undisclosed illness. This was the same day as the release of the album. Big Nuz proceeded with the launch of the album in honour of Mashesha. The album received the award for Best Kwaito album and brought the group the award for Best Duo or Group of the year. The group posthumously dedicated both awards to Mashesha.

=== 2022–present: R Mashesha ===
Following a seven-year hiatus, Mandla announced the return of the band and they began working on an album.

Their seventh studio album R Mashesha was released on 25 November 2022. Their song 'Ngeke' won song of the year on the Zulu radio station UKhozi FM.

Band member Mampintsha died from a stroke on 24 December 2022, at the age of 40.

== Band members ==
- Sbu (2002-2015; his death)
- Mandla (2002-2022; his death)
- Mzi (2002–present)

== Discography ==
=== Albums ===
| Album title | Album details |
|---|---|
| Zozo | Released: 2006; Label: Gallo/Why Not Entertainment; Formats: CD, Digital download |
| 2nd Round Knockout | Released: 13 March 2008; Label: Afrotainment/Kalawa Jazmee Records; Formats: CD, Digital download |
| Undisputed | Released: 30 October 2009; Label: Afrotainment; Formats: CD, Digital download |
| R Mashesha | Released: 25 November 2022; Label: Afrotainment; Formats: Streaming, Digital download |

== Awards and nominations ==
| Year | Award Ceremony | Category | Work/Recipient | Result | Ref. |
|---|---|---|---|---|---|
| 2008 | 9th AMFA | Best Kwaito Album | "2nd Round Knockout" | Won | |
| 2008 | Channel O Music Awards | Best Kwaito Album | "2nd Round Knockout" | Nominated | |
| 2010 | 16th SAMA | Album of the Year | "Undisputed" | Won | |
| 2010 | 16th SAMA | Best Kwaito Album | "Undisputed" | Won | |
| 2010 | 16th SAMA | MTN Record of the Year | "Umlilo" | Won | |
| 2010 | MTV Africa Music Awards | Best Anglophone | | Nominated | |
| 2014 | MTV Africa Music Awards | Best Group/Duo | | Nominated | |
| 2016 | 22nd South African Music Awards | Duo/Group of the Year | For the Fans | Won | |
| 2022 | South African Music Awards | Song of the Year | R Mashesha | Won | |
| 2023 | Metro FM Music Awards | Song of the Year | "Ngeke" | Nominated | |
| 2024 | Metro FM Music Awards | Best Kwaito/Gqom | "Hello" | Won | |
