= A-Trak discography =

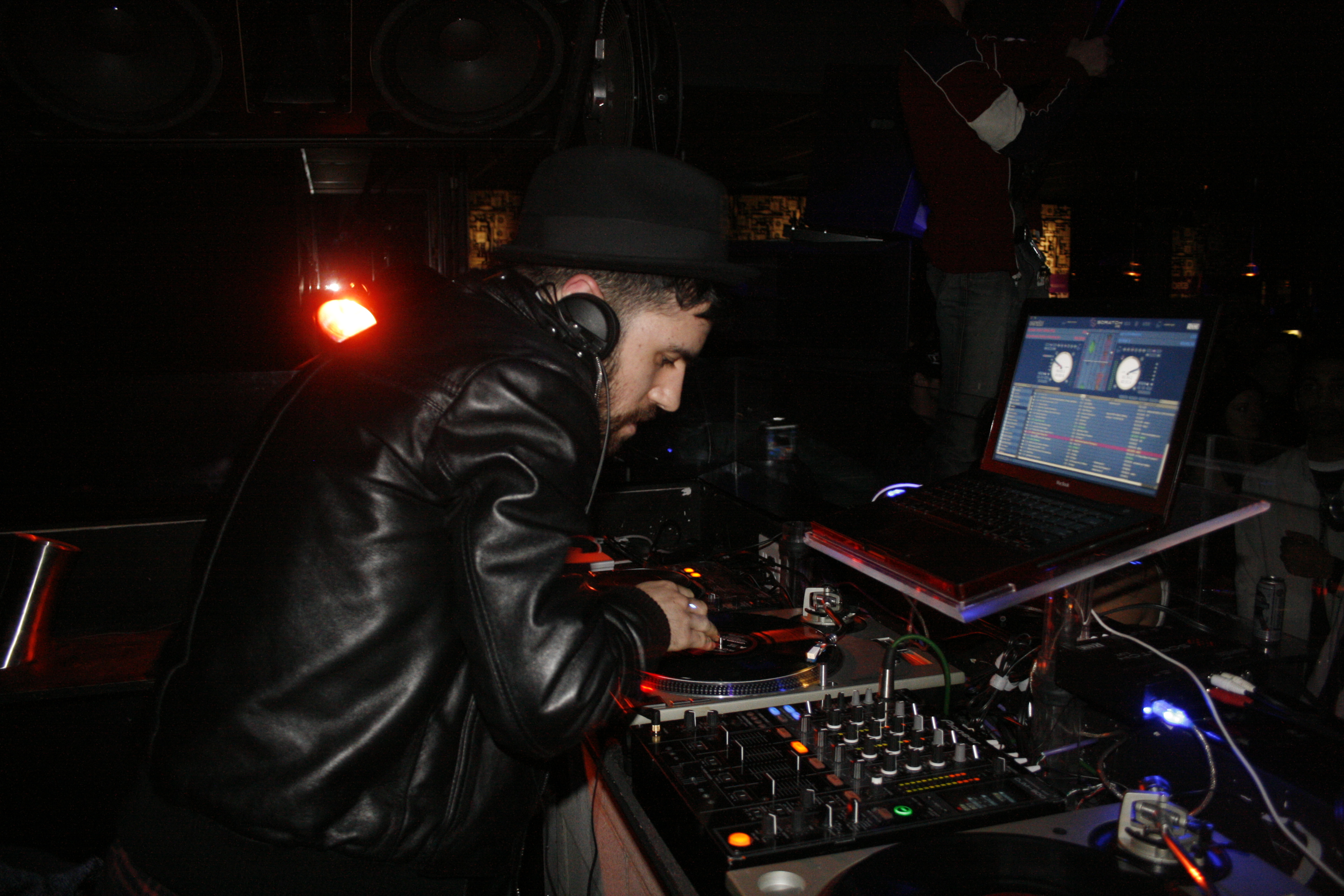
- A-Trak performing at Beta Nightclub in Denver, Colorado in 2008
- Studio albums: 2
- EPs: 1
- Compilation albums: 1
- Singles: 24

Canadian DJ and producer A-Trak has released seven full-length DJ mixtapes, one EP, and dozens of singles of original music as a solo artist; he has remixed hundreds of tracks as a DJ. A collaborator since the beginning of his career, A-Trak has focused on co-producing music with other artists since the early 2000s and has been part of musical groups The Brothers Macklovitch (2020–present), Duck Sauce (2009–present), Low Pros (2014), DJ crew The Allies (1998–2000), and hip hop crew Obscure Disorder (1997–2000).

== Charting records ==
=== Charted albums ===
Title	Year	Peak chart positions	
Title	Year	US Dance	US Heat.
Running Man: Nike+ Original Run	2008	20	—
Tuna Melt (EP)	2012	21	35

=== Charted singles ===
==== As lead artist ====
Title	Year	Peak chart positions				
Title	Year	CAN	US	US Dance	BEL	NZ Hot
"Out the Speakers" (with Milo & Otis featuring Rich Kidz)	2015	—	98	10	—	—
"We All Fall Down" (featuring Jamie Lidell)	2015	—	—	27	30	—
"Push" (featuring Andrew Wyatt)	2015	86	—	—	—	—
"Work It Out"	2019	—	—	—	—	37
"What Can I Do" (with Loods)	2019	—	—	—	—	34
"—" denotes a recording that did not chart or was not released.

==== As featured artist ====
Title	Year	Peak chart positions
Title	Year	NZ
"Warrior" (Kimbra featuring Mark Foster and A-Trak)	2012	22

== Albums ==
=== As solo artist (DJ mixes) ===
- Oh No You Didn't: Live in Vancouver – Disque Primeur (2006)
- Sunglasses Is A Must – Audio Research (2006)
- Dirty South Dance – Obey Records (2007)
- Running Man: Nike+ Original Run – Nike+ Sport Music (2008)
- Infinity + 1 – Thrive Records (2009)
- FabricLive.45 – Fabric Records (2009)
- Dirty South Dance 2 – Fool's Gold (2010)

=== As part of Obscure Disorder ===
- Full Circle: 1997-2002 Retrospective – Audio Research (2018) (compilation)

=== As part of The Allies ===
- D-Day – Asphodel (2000)

=== As part of Duck Sauce ===
- Quack – Fool's Gold (2014)

== Extended plays ==
=== As solo artist ===
- Tuna Melt EP – Fool's Gold (2012)

=== As part of Low Pros ===
- Low Pros – Fool's Gold (2014)

=== As part of Duck Sauce ===
- Greatest Hits – Fool's Gold (2009)
- Duck Droppings – self-released (2014)

== Singles ==
=== As solo artist ===
- "Umbilical Chord" – London/FFFR (1999)
- "Enter Ralph Wiggum" – Stones Throw (1999) [7"]
- "All Hail To My Hands" – Asphodel (2000)
- "Gangsta Breaks" –Ammo (2001) [12"]
- "Monkeyboy Breaks" – Ammo (2003) [12"]
- "Don't Fool With The Dips" featuring J.R. Writer, Hell Rell and 40 Cal. – Audio Research (2005) [12"]
- "Sunglasses Is A Must" – Smelly Fatso/Monkey Studies Records (2006) [12"]
- "Step Off" featuring Little Brother – Audio Research (2006) [12"]
- "Knucklehead" – Audio Research (2006) [7"]
- "Quitte La Piste" featuring TTC – (2006)
- "Mastered (Me & My Sneakers)" featuring Lupe Fiasco – Nike+ (2007)
- "Running Man"– Nike+ (2007)
- "Say Whoa" – Kitsuné (2007) [12"]
- "Ray Ban Vision" featuring CyHi Da Prince – Fool's Gold (2010)
- "Piss Test" featuring Juicy J and Danny Brown – Fool's Gold (2012)
- "Piss Test Remix" featuring Juicy J, Jim Jones, Flatbush Zombies, El-P, and Flosstradamus – Fool's Gold (2013) [Label Compilation]
- "Out the Speakers" featuring Rich Kidz – Green Label Sound (2015)
- "Ibanez" featuring Cory Enemy and Nico Stadi – Spinnin' Records (2015)
- "Push" featuring Andrew Wyatt – Fool's Gold (2015)
- "We All Fall Down" featuring Jamie Lidell – Fool's Gold (2015)
- "Parallel Lines" featuring Phantogram – Fool's Gold (2016)
- "Believe" featuring Quavo and Lil Yachty – Fool's Gold (2017)
- "Work It Out" – Fool's Gold (2019)
- "What Can I Do" featuring Loods – Fool's Gold (2019)
- "Blaze" with Friend Within – Fool's Gold (2019)

=== As collaborative artist ===
- with Herve: "Roll With The Winners" – Cheap Thrills (2008)
- with Laidback Luke: "Shake It Down" – Fool's Gold/Mixmash (2008)
- with Zinc: "Like The Dancefloor" featuring Natalie Storm – Rinse (2008)
- with Zinc: "Stingray" – Fool's Gold (2011)
- with Mark Foster and Kimbra: "Warrior" – Converse (2012)
- with Dillon Francis: "Money Makin'"– Fool's Gold (2012)
- with GTA : "Landlines 2.0" – Fool's Gold (2013)
- with Laidback Luke: "Shake It Down" – Fool's Gold (2013)
- with Oliver: "Zamboni" – Fool's Gold (2013)
- with Cam'ron and Federal Reserve: "Dipshi*ts" featuring Juelz Santana – Federal Reserve (2014)
- with ZHU and Keznamdi: "As Crazy As It Is" – Columbia Records (2015)
- with Zoofunktion: "Place on Earth" – Spinnin' Records (2015)
- with Tommy Trash: "Lose My Mind" – Fool's Gold (2016)
- with Baauer: "Fern Gully" b/w "Dumbo Drop" – Fool's Gold (2017)
- with Falcons: "Ride for Me" featuring Young Thug and 24hrs – Fool's Gold (2018)
- with Yehme2: "Prayer Hands" – Fool's Gold (2018)
- with Todd Terry: "DJs Gotta Dance More" – Fool's Gold (2018)
- with Ferreck Dawn: "Coming Home" – Club Sweat (2020)
- with Ferreck Dawn: "My Own Way" – Fool's Gold Records (2021)
- with Wongo (music producer) featuring Ladybug Mecca: "Querida" – Fool's Gold Records (2021)

=== As part of Obscure Disorder ===
- "Lyrically Exposed" – Audio Research (1997)
- "Maintain the Focus" b/w "Small Talk" – Audio Research (1998)
- "2004" b/w "The Entree" – Audio Research (1999)
- "The Grill" b/w "Like" – Audio Research (2002)

=== As part of Duck Sauce ===
- "aNYway" – Ministry of Sound/Fool's Gold (2009)
- "Barbra Streisand" – 3Beat/Downtown/Fool's Gold (2010)
- "Big Bad Wolf" – Big Beat (2011)
- "Radio Stereo" – Duck Sauce/Universal (2013)
- "It's You" – Duck Sauce/Universal (2013)
- "NRG" – Fool's Gold (2014)
- "Ring Me" – Fool's Gold (2014)
- "Get to Steppin" b/w "Smiley Face – Duck Sauce (2020)
- "Captain Duck" b/w/ "I Don't Mind" – Duck Sauce (2020)

=== As part of The Brothers Macklovitch ===
- "Give Love to Get Some" – Fool's Gold (2020)
- "I Can Call You" feat. Leven Kali – Fool's Gold (2020)

=== As featured artist ===
- with Gidas and Masaya: "Like Woah" Alex Gopher Edit – Kitsuné (2008)
- with Lifelike: "Don't Stop" – Kitsuné (2012)
- with Madeaux: "Lost in Translation" – Fool's Gold (2015)
- with ZHU: "As Crazy As It Is" – Columbia (2015)
- with Wolfgang Garter: "Up in Smoke" also featuring Jesse Boykins III – Armada Music (2016)
- with Tommy Trash: "Lover" – Fool's Gold (2016)
- with Calvin Harris: "Prayer's Up" also featuring Travis Scott – Sony (2017)
- with The Cool Kids: "T.D.A." also featuring Reese LAFLARE and Larry June – Propelr Music (2017)
- with Injury Reserve: "Koruna & Lime" – Seneca Village Recordings (2019)
- with Common: "Leaders (Crib Love)" – Common (2019)
- with Travis Thompson: "Don't Run" – Epic Records/Sony (2019)

== Remix discography ==
=== Compilations ===
- In the Loop: A Decade of Remixes – Fool's Gold (2016)

=== Singles ===
Non-exhaustive discography

- D-Styles – "Felonious Funk" (2003)
- Bonde Do Role – "Melo Do Tabaco" (2006)
- Architecture In Helsinki – "Heart It Races" (2007)
- Bumblebeez – "Dr. Love" (2007)
- Scanners – "Bombs" (2007)
- James Pants – "Kash" (2007)
- Simian Mobile Disco – "Hustler" (2007)
- Digitalism – "Idealistic" (2007)
- Kanye West – "Stronger" (2008)
- Boys Noize – "Oh!" (2008)
- Count & Sinden – "Beeper" (2008)
- Daft Punk – "Robot Rock" (2009)
- MSTRKRFT featuring NORE – "Bounce" (2009)
- Sébastien Tellier – "Kilometer" (2009)
- Yeah Yeah Yeahs – "Heads Will Roll" (2009)
- Justice – "D.A.N.C.E." (2010) (from "DJ Hero 2")
- Tiga – "What You Need" (2010)
- Robyn – "Indestructible" (2010)
- DJ Sneak – "U Can't Hide From Your Bud" (2010)
- The Rapture – "How Deep Is Your Love" (2011)
- Laidback Luke and Sander Van Doorn – "Who's Wearing The Cap" (2011)
- Martin Solveig – "The Night Out" (2012)
- Martin Solveig – "The Night Out" with Martin Solveig (2012)
- Surkin – "Never Let Go" (2012)
- Justice – "New Lands" (2012)
- Zedd – "Spectrum" with Clockwork (2012)
- Cerrone – "Misunderstanding" with Codes (2012)
- Kavinsky — Odd Look (2013)
- Phoenix – "Trying to Be Cool" (2013)
- Jack Beats – "Just A Beat" (2013)
- Alesso featuring Roy English – "Cool" (2014)
- The Chainsmokers featuring Great Good Fine Ok – "Let You Go" (2015)
- Disclosure featuring Lorde – "Magnets" (2015)
- Bob Moses – "Tearing Me Up" – Domino (2016)
- Dillon Francis – "Anywhere" (2016)
- Maroon 5 featuring SZA – "What Lovers Do" (2017)
- Charlotte Gainsbourg – "Sylvia Says" (2018)
- Ferreck Dawn and Robosonic -–"In Arms" (2018)
- ABBA – "Voulez-Vous" (2018)
- Showtek — "Listen To Your Momma" (2019)
- Axwell — "Nobody Else" (2019)
- The Magician — "Ready to Love" (2019)
- Phantoms featuring Anna Clendening – "Say It" (2019)
- Weiss and Harry Romero - "Where Do We Go?" (2020)

== Production discography ==
Selected discography

- "Overdose Music" by Obscure Disorder – Audio Research (2000)
- "All Hail To My Hands" by The Allies – Asphodel (2000)
- "The Grill" by Obscure Disorder – Audio Research (2000)
- "Felonius Funk" b/w "The Murder Faktory by D-Styles – Audio Research (2002)
- "Gold Digger" Kanye West featuring Jamie Foxx – Roc-A-Fella Records (2005)
- "Chi State of Mind" by GLC – GOOD Music (2006)
- "Regarde-Les" by Dabaaz – Disque Primeur (2006)
- "Stronger" by Kanye West – Roc-A-Fella Records (2007)
- "Damn Girl" by Kid Sister – Fool's Gold (2007)
- "Pro Nails" by Kid Sister – Fool's Gold (2007)
- "RoboCop" by Kanye West – Roc-A-Fella Records (2008)
- "Get Fresh" with XXXChange by Kid Sister – Downtown (2008)
- "You Ain't Really Down" by Kid Sister – Downtown (2009)
- "H Town" with Oligee by Dizzee Rascal – Dirtee Stank (2012)
- "Smokin & Drinkin" with JMIKE by Danny Brown – Fool's Gold (2013)
- "Champions" with Lex Luger by Kanye West, Travis Scott, Big Sean, Desiigner, Quavo, 2 Chainz, Gucci Mane – (2016)
- "Kitana" with Lex Luger by Princess Nokia – Rough Trade (2017)
- "Adlibbin’ Crazy" with Danny Brown by Index (Inhansed & Nick XL) – (2018)

== Credits for scratches ==
- "Lyrically Exposed" by Obscure Disorder (1997)
- "Soul Pleureur (Part 2)" by Dubmatique (1997)
- "Tale of Five Cities" by Peanut Butter Wolf (1998) (with others)
- "Think Twice" by Shades of Culture (1998)
- "Do The Math" by D-Shade (1998)
- "Maintain the Focus" & "Small Talk" by Obscure Disorder (1998)
- "Superior Raps" featuring Obscure Disorder by Hundred Strong (1999)
- "2004,"The Entree," & "Full Circle" by Obscure Disorder (1999)
- "Les Rues Sont Énervées" by Yvon Krevé (2000)
- "All Hail To My Hands" by The Allies (2000)
- "Mindblowin" by Troy Dunnit (2001)
- "Cult Leader" by Non Phixion (2002)
- "Go!" by Common by Geffen (2005)
- "Gold Digger" by Kanye West – Roc-A-Fella/Def Jam (2005)
- "Do What You Do" by Consequence (2006)
- "Regardes-Les" by Dabazz (2007)
- "Control" by Kid Sister (2009)
- "Make Her Say" by Kid Cudi featuring Kanye West & Common (2009)
- "Show Me A Good Time" by Drake (2010)
- "Side A (Old)" by Danny Brown (2013)
- "Acceptance Speech" by Ill Bill (2013)
- "Prayers Up" by Calvin Harris (2017)
