= Quack (album) =

Studio album by Duck Sauce
- Released: April 14, 2014
- Genre: Nu-disco; funky house
- Length: 54:28
- Label: Fool's Gold
- Producer: Duck Sauce

Duck Sauce chronology
Greatest Hits (2010)	Quack (2014)

Singles from Quack
- 1. "Anyway" Released: October 25, 2009; 2. "Barbra Streisand" Released: September 10, 2010; 3. "It's You" Released: June 25, 2013; 4. "Radio Stereo" Released: October 12, 2013; 5. "NRG" Released: April 8, 2014

Professional ratings
Aggregate scores
Source	Rating
Metacritic	76/100
Review scores
Source	Rating
AllMusic	3.5/5 stars
Pitchfork	(7.5/10)
PopMatters	7/10 stars
Rolling Stone	4/5 stars
Spin	(5/10)

Quack is the only studio album by American DJ duo Duck Sauce. It was released on April 14, 2014, by Fool's Gold Records.

== Track listing ==
Adapted from iTunes and Qobuz.

No.	Title	Writer(s)	Producer(s)	Length
1.	"Chariots of the Gods" (featuring Rockets)	Armand van Helden; Alain Macklovitch; Oliver Goldstein; David Macklovitch; Christian Le Bartz	Duck Sauce; David Macklovitch^{[a]}; Vaughn Oliver^{[a]}	5:55
2.	"Charlie Chazz & Rappin Ralph"	van Helden; A. Macklovitch; J. Weider; Terry McFaddin; J Footman	Duck Sauce; David Macklovitch^{[a]}; Vaughn Oliver^{[a]}	4:57
3.	"It's You"	van Helden; A. Macklovitch; Bruce Patch; Alan Sanchez	Duck Sauce; David Macklovitch^{[a]}; Vaughn Oliver^{[a]}	3:10
4.	"Goody Two Shoes"	van Helden; A. Macklovitch; Bruce Ley; William Morrison	Duck Sauce	4:29
5.	"Radio Stereo"	van Helden; A. Macklovitch; Nigel Bennett	Duck Sauce; David Macklovitch^{[a]}; Vaughn Oliver^{[a]}	4:20
6.	"Anyway"	van Helden; A. Macklovitch; Stafford Floyd; Jonathan Floyd; Reginald Brown	Duck Sauce	5:02
7.	"NRG"	George Michael Elian; Charles Edward Halstead; Janis Tunnell	Duck Sauce; David Macklovitch^{[b]}	3:31
8.	"Everyone" (featuring Teddy Toothpick)	van Helden; A. Macklovitch; D. Macklovitch; S. Stills; C. Stills	Duck Sauce; David Macklovitch^{[a]}; Vaughn Oliver^{[a]}	4:59
9.	"Ring Me"	van Helden; A. Macklovitch; K Van Haaren; Tony Hendrick	Duck Sauce	4:23
10.	"Barbra Streisand"	van Helden; A. Macklovitch; Frank Farian; Fred Jay; Heinz Huth; Juergen Huth	Duck Sauce	4:24
11.	"Spandex"	van Helden; A. Macklovitch; Alides Hidding	Duck Sauce	4:28
12.	"Time Waits for No-One"	Martin Page; Brian Fairweather	Duck Sauce; Vaughn Oliver^{[a]}	4:42

Notes

- ^{^[a]} signifies additional producer
- ^{^[b]} signifies is a co-producer

== Charts ==
Chart performance for Quack
Chart (2014)	Peak position
US Independent Albums (Billboard)	50
US Top Dance/Electronic Albums (Billboard)	10

== Release history ==
Region	Date	Format	Label
United States	April 15, 2014	Digital download	Fool's Gold
United States	May 19, 2014	CD	Fool's Gold
