= Macklovitch =

Macklovitch is a surname. Notable people with the surname include:

- Alain Macklovitch (born 1982), better known as A-Trak, Canadian DJ and musician
- David Macklovitch (born 1978), better known as Chromeo, Canadian musician and singer
