= 2012 MTV Video Music Awards =

Award ceremony

- Date: Thursday, September 6, 2012
- Location: Staples Center (Los Angeles, California)
- Country: United States
- Hosted by: Kevin Hart
- Most awards: One Direction (3)
- Most nominations: Rihanna and Drake (5 each)

Television/radio coverage
- Network: MTV
- Produced by: Amy Doyle; Garrett English; Jesse Ignjatovic; Dave Sirulnick
- Directed by: Hamish Hamilton

The 2012 MTV Video Music Awards, hosted by Kevin Hart, took place on Thursday, September 6, 2012, honoring the best music videos from the previous year. The awards were broadcast from the Staples Center arena at L.A. Live in Downtown Los Angeles. Nominations were announced on July 31, 2012. Rihanna and Drake were the most nominated artists that year, with five nominations apiece, followed by Katy Perry and Beyoncé, who received four.

One Direction was the biggest winner of the night winning their three nominations, including Best New Artist, and Rihanna went on to win Video of the Year. Both M.I.A. and Chris Brown won two awards each.

The awards ceremony, with an average of 6.1 million viewers, was the least-watched VMA show since 2007. The major factor which contributed to the drop in ratings was most likely altering the program's broadcast date to Thursday instead of Sunday, the day MTV had been using since 2004, with the exception of the 2006 ceremony. MTV also moved up the telecast to 8pm instead of 9pm, to avoid competing with President Barack Obama's speech at the 2012 Democratic National Convention. This was somewhat early for MTV's targeted audience. Best Special Effects renamed Best Visual Effects.

== Performances ==
Artist(s)	Song(s)
Pre-show
Demi Lovato	"Give Your Heart a Break"
Main show
Rihanna; ASAP Rocky; Calvin Harris	"Cockiness (Love It)" (Remix) "We Found Love"
Pink	"Get The Party Started" (intro) "Blow Me (One Last Kiss)"
Frank Ocean	"Thinkin' Bout You"
One Direction	"One Thing"
Lil Wayne; 2 Chainz	"Yuck!" "No Worries"
Green Day	"Let Yourself Go"
Alicia Keys; Nicki Minaj	"Girl on Fire" (with Gabby Douglas)
Taylor Swift	"We Are Never Ever Getting Back Together"

House artist

- Calvin Harris

== Presenters ==
=== Pre-show ===
- Sway Calloway – presented Best Video with a Message
- James Montgomery – presented Best Electronic Dance Music Video
- Jim Cantiello and Ton Do-Nguyen – presented Most Share-Worthy Video
- Christina Garibaldi – Red Carpet

=== Main show ===
- Katy Perry – presented Best Pop Video
- Dwight Howard – chatted with host Kevin Hart and introduced the next set of presenters
- Miley Cyrus and Mac Miller – introduced P!nk
- Demi Lovato and Rita Ora – presented Best Male Video
- Zoe Saldaña – introduced Frank Ocean
- Rashida Jones and Andy Samberg – presented Best Hip-Hop Video
- The Wanted and Rebel Wilson – presented Best Female Video
- Psy – appeared and danced to his "Gangnam Style" on stage with host Kevin Hart while he introduced the next presenters
- Ezra Miller and Emma Watson – introduced Green Day
- Peter Facinelli, Elizabeth Reaser, Bill Condon, Robert Pattinson, Taylor Lautner and Jackson Rathbone – introduced an exclusive Breaking Dawn: Part 2 sneak peek preview
- Kesha and Wiz Khalifa – presented Best New Artist
- The Fierce Five (Aly Raisman, Gabby Douglas, Jordyn Wieber, Kyla Ross and McKayla Maroney) – introduced Alicia Keys
- Kevin Hart – presented Video of the Year and introduced Taylor Swift

== Winners and nominees ==
Nominees were announced on July 31, 2012.

Video of the Year	Best Male Video
Rihanna (featuring Calvin Harris) – "We Found Love"; Drake (featuring Rihanna) – "Take Care"; Gotye (featuring Kimbra) – "Somebody That I Used to Know"; M.I.A. – "Bad Girls"; Katy Perry – "Wide Awake"	Chris Brown – "Turn Up the Music"; Justin Bieber – "Boyfriend"; Drake (featuring Rihanna) – "Take Care"; Frank Ocean – "Swim Good"; Usher – "Climax"
Best Female Video	Best New Artist
Nicki Minaj – "Starships"; Beyoncé – "Love on Top"; Selena Gomez & the Scene – "Love You Like a Love Song"; Katy Perry – "Part of Me"; Rihanna (featuring Calvin Harris) – "We Found Love"	One Direction – "What Makes You Beautiful"; fun. (featuring Janelle Monáe) – "We Are Young"; Carly Rae Jepsen – "Call Me Maybe"; Frank Ocean – "Swim Good"; The Wanted – "Glad You Came"
Best Pop Video	Best Rock Video
One Direction – "What Makes You Beautiful"; Justin Bieber – "Boyfriend"; fun. (featuring Janelle Monáe) – "We Are Young"; Maroon 5 (featuring Wiz Khalifa) – "Payphone"; Rihanna (featuring Calvin Harris) – "We Found Love"	Coldplay – "Paradise"; The Black Keys – "Lonely Boy"; Imagine Dragons – "It's Time"; Linkin Park – "Burn It Down"; Jack White – "Sixteen Saltines"
Best Hip-Hop Video	Best Electronic Dance Music Video
Drake (featuring Lil Wayne) – "HYFR"; Childish Gambino – "Heartbeat"; Jay-Z and Kanye West – "Paris"; Nicki Minaj (featuring 2 Chainz) – "Beez in the Trap"; Kanye West (featuring Pusha T, Big Sean and 2 Chainz) – "Mercy"	Calvin Harris – "Feel So Close"; Avicii – "Levels"; Duck Sauce – "Big Bad Wolf"; Skrillex – "First of the Year (Equinox)"; Martin Solveig – "The Night Out"
Best Direction	Best Choreography
M.I.A. – "Bad Girls" (Director: Romain Gavras); Coldplay (featuring Rihanna) – "Princess of China" (Director: Adria Petty and Alan Bibby); Duck Sauce – "Big Bad Wolf" (Director: Keith Schofield); Jay-Z and Kanye West (featuring Otis Redding) – "Otis" (Director: Spike Jonze); Frank Ocean – "Swim Good" (Director: Nabil Elderkin)	Chris Brown – "Turn Up the Music" (Choreographer: Anwar "Flii" Burton); Avicii – "Levels" (Choreographers: Richy Greenfield and Petro Papahadjopoulos); Beyoncé – "Countdown" (Choreographers: Danielle Polanco, Frank Gatson, Beyoncé and Anne Teresa De Keersmaeker); Jennifer Lopez (featuring Pitbull) – "Dance Again" (Choreographer: JR Taylor); Rihanna – "Where Have You Been" (Choreographer: Hi-Hat)
Best Visual Effects	Best Art Direction
Skrillex – "First of the Year (Equinox)" (Visual Effects: Deka Brothers and Tony "Truand" Datis); David Guetta (featuring Nicki Minaj) – "Turn Me On" (Visual Effects: Alex Frisch, Joe Harkins, Scott Metzger and Vico Sharabani); Linkin Park – "Burn It Down" (Visual Effects: Ghost Town Media); Katy Perry – "Wide Awake" (Visual Effects: Ingenuity Engine); Rihanna – "Where Have You Been" (Visual Effects: BAKED FX)	Katy Perry – "Wide Awake" (Art Director: Benji Bamps); Lana Del Rey – "Born to Die" (Art Directors: Anna Brun and Audrey Malecot); Drake (featuring Rihanna) – "Take Care" (Art Director: Jeff Higinbotham); Of Monsters and Men – "Little Talks" (Art Director: Mihai Wilson and Marcella Moser); Regina Spektor – "All the Rowboats" (Art Director: Anthony Henderson)
Best Editing	Best Cinematography
Beyoncé – "Countdown" (Editors: Alexander Hammer and Jeremiah Shuff); ASAP Rocky – "Goldie" (Editor: Samantha Lecca); Gotye (featuring Kimbra) – "Somebody That I Used to Know" (Editor: Natasha Pincus); Jay-Z and Kanye West – "Paris" (Editors: Alexander Hammer, Peter Johnson and Derek Lee); Kanye West (featuring Pusha T, Big Sean and 2 Chainz) – "Mercy" (Editor: Eric Greenburg)	M.I.A. – "Bad Girls" (Director of Photography: André Chemetoff); Adele – "Someone Like You" (Director of Photography: David Johnson); Coldplay (featuring Rihanna) – "Princess of China" (Director of Photography: Stéphane Vallée); Lana Del Rey – "Born to Die" (Director of Photography: André Chemetoff); Drake (featuring Rihanna) – "Take Care" (Director of Photography: Kasper Tuxen)
Best Video with a Message	Most Share-Worthy Video
Demi Lovato – "Skyscraper"; Kelly Clarkson – "Dark Side"; Gym Class Heroes (featuring Ryan Tedder) – "The Fighter"; K'naan (featuring Nelly Furtado) – "Is Anybody Out There?"; Lil Wayne – "How to Love"; Rise Against – "Ballad of Hollis Brown"	One Direction – "What Makes You Beautiful"; Beyoncé – "Countdown"; Justin Bieber – "Boyfriend"; Gotye (featuring Kimbra) – "Somebody That I Used to Know"; Carly Rae Jepsen – "Call Me Maybe"
Best Latino Artist
Romeo Santos; Juanes; Jennifer Lopez; Pitbull; Wisin & Yandel

== Artists with multiple wins and nominations ==
Artists who received multiple awards
Wins	Artist
3	One Direction
2	Chris Brown
2	M.I.A.

Artists who received multiple nominations
Nominations	Artist
5	Drake
5	Rihanna
4	Beyoncé
4	Katy Perry
3	Coldplay
3	Frank Ocean
3	Gotye
3	Jay-Z
3	Justin Bieber
3	M.I.A.
3	One Direction
2	Avicii
2	Carly Rae Jepsen
2	Chris Brown
2	Duck Sauce
2	fun.
2	Jennifer Lopez
2	Kanye West
2	Lana Del Rey
2	Linkin Park
2	Nicki Minaj
2	Skrillex

== Music Videos with multiple wins and nominations ==
Music Videos that received multiple awards
Wins	Artist	Music Video
3	One Direction	"What Makes You Beautiful"
2	Chris Brown	"Turn Up the Music"
2	M.I.A.	"Bad Girls"

Music Videos that received multiple nominations
Nominations	Artist	Music Video
4	Drake (featuring Rihanna)	"Take Care"
3	Beyoncé	"Countdown"
3	Frank Ocean	"Swim Good"
3	Gotye (featuring Kimbra)	"Somebody That I Used to Know"
3	Justin Bieber	"Boyfriend"
3	Katy Perry	"Wide Awake"
3	M.I.A.	"Bad Girls"
3	One Direction	"What Makes You Beautiful"
3	Rihanna (featuring Calvin Harris)	"We Found Love"
2	Avicii	"Levels"
2	Carly Rae Jepsen	"Call Me Maybe"
2	Chris Brown	"Turn Up the Music"
2	Coldplay (featuring Rihanna)	"Princess of China"
2	Duck Sauce	"Big Bad Wolf"
2	fun. (featuring Janelle Monáe)	"We Are Young"
2	Jay-Z and Kanye West	"Paris"
2	Kanye West (featuring Pusha T, Big Sean and 2 Chainz)	"Mercy"
2	Lana Del Rey	"Born to Die"
2	Linkin Park	"Burn It Down"
2	Rihanna	"Where Have You Been"
2	Skrillex	"First of the Year (Equinox)"

== See also ==
- 2012 MTV Europe Music Awards
