= List of Kanye West live performances =

Kanye West live performances
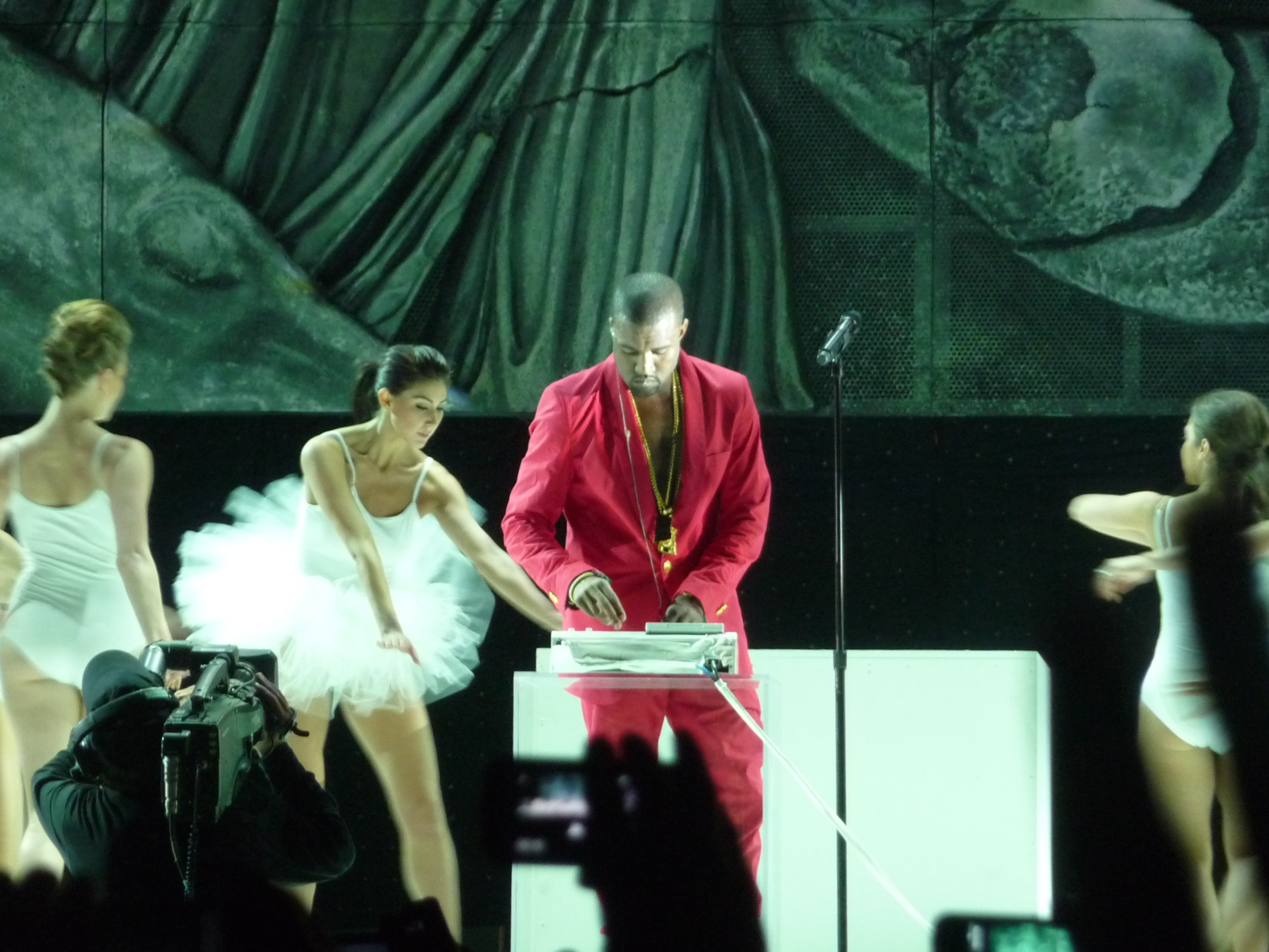
- West performing at Coachella Festival in 2011.
- ↙Tours: 7
- ↙Residencies: 3
- ↙Operas: 2
- ↙Award shows: 28
- ↙Television Shows: 52
- ↙Specials: 30
- ↙Festivals: 91
- ↙Other: 30

Kanye West, an American hip-hop artist and record producer, has headlined six concert tours and delivered live performances at numerous award ceremonies and television events.

== Concert tours ==
Year	Title	Duration	Shows
2004	School Spirit Tour	March 16, 2004 – May 5, 2004 (North America)	34
The School Spirit Tour was Kanye West's first headline tour, taking place in 2004. The tour featured a collegiate theme. Not only did it kick off at Virginia Tech, it hit a number of college towns across the states—from Pace University in New York to George Washington University in DC, ending with three shows at House of Blues in West's hometown, Chicago. The tour was opened by Dilated Peoples, and featured John Legend as the pianist and signer, along with A-Trak as tour DJ. Onstage, West paced in front of seven slim LED-screens, with the Chicago cityscape as his background.
2005	Touch the Sky Tour	October 12, 2005 – December 11, 2005 (North America)	48
The Touch the Sky Tour was announced on September 15, 2005, and started off with a few hiccups, as West was making changes right down to the last minute. For example, West scrapped the Touch the Sky Tour's entire lighting plan just two weeks before the opening show in Miami. West got Es Devlin to redo the tour. Meanwhile, just days before West was meant to start touring, opening act Common landed an acting role and couldn't make it. This left West with Fantasia and Keyshia Cole for his opening acts, but Common would appear when his schedule allowed. The stage show was accompanied by a six-piece string section and featured live video of the show projected behind the stage. Positive reviews of his music and character were projected behind the stage, and he wore six different costume pieces (designer blazers). There was a UK leg of the tour in February 2006 in the cities of Manchester, Glasgow, London, Cardiff and Birmingham, and an Australia tour commenced in late March and early April 2006.
2008	Glow in the Dark Tour	April 16, 2008 – December 7, 2008 (Worldwide)	88
The Glow In The Dark Tour took place in more than 50 arena and festival shows in the U.S., Canada, and the U.K. before heading to Mexico and South America and to the Far East and Europe. The tours opening acts included Lupe Fiasco, N.E.R.D., and Rihanna, along with tour and stage DJ's A-trak and Tommy Switch. The concept pitted West as the pilot of a spaceship hitting a meteor storm, landing on a desolate planet of dry ice, and trying to find his way home through tracks from The College Dropout, Late Registration, Graduation, and latterly 808s & Heartbreak, which was released prior to the final leg of the tour in Australia and New Zealand. With design again done by Es Devlin, in collaboration with Martin Phillips and John McGuire, the stage was transformed into a barren series of landscapes—one resembling a giant moon—and fantastical glow-in-the-dark features: a giant, glowing-eyed monster and a robot moved within the haze, women shimmered in gold paint for the track "Gold Digger", and stunning multi-colored light sequences lit up the often smoke-filled stage. West himself wore sci-fi themed threads, glow-in-the-dark accessories, his signature shutter shades, and gloves. The performance tour was captured in the book of photography Glow in the Dark by Nabil Elderkin.
2011–12	Watch the Throne Tour	October 29, 2011 – June 12, 2012 (North America & Europe)	68
The Watch the Throne Tour with Jay-Z was in support of the pairs collaborative album Watch the Throne. The concert had no opening act and featured the two performers perched on massive video cubes showing sharks, rottweilers, crows, and tigers in a sea of darkness punctuated only by cellphone lights and piercing lasers. "Attenborough BBC wildlife content and lasers" was the brief given to stage designer Es Devlin by West for the tour. Devlin used hundreds of laser beams to create a myriad of different frames to this alternate world of geometric shapes, cascading light, wild animals, and its stars: West and Jay Z. Their habit of playing the smash hit "Niggas in Paris" eight, nine, or ten times in a row quickly became the stuff of legend. On the tour visits in the city of Paris, the song was played 11 and 12 times. They partnered up with Givenchy for the clothing and the two donned t-shirts and leather pants. The tour grossed $95 million, and became the highest grossing hip-hop tour of all time.
2013	The Yeezus Tour	October 19, 2013 – September 15, 2014 (North America & Australia)	45
The Yeezus Tour served as West's first solo concert tour in five years, and featured a man-made mountain, diamond encrusted masks, and a catwalk. It was this tour that had the New York Post reviewer praising "an extravaganza of music and theater that gives the world windows into [West’s] erratic persona." This visual feast was created through collaboration between set designer Es Devlin, West's design company DONDA, fashion house Maison Margiela, artist Vanessa Beecroft, and more. West staged the reincarnation of Jesus and delivered sermons on the state of the world on this tour. The Yeezus stage set and concept—featuring a giant mountain that occasionally turned into a volcano, West wore a custom-made Margiela mask that obscured his whole face. West worked closely with Maison Margiela to curate the show, and his wardrobe for the Tour was composed of 10 couture pieces, 20 ready-to-wear pieces, and an exclusive pair of sneakers, as well as the famous masks. Onstage, Devlin had constructed a mountain, which was sometimes wreathed in flames, sometimes covered with women in long white dresses. At times it would split in two halves, or become a volcano. There was an iceberg, 12 nude-nylon clad dancers, and a catwalk, alluding back to the fashion show created with Margiela. The speeches also became a key part of the Yeezus show.
2016	Saint Pablo Tour	August 25, 2016 – November 21, 2016 (North America)	41
The Saint Pablo Tour in support of The Life of Pablo featured a "floating stage" suspended by a network of cables. West spent the entire set hovering above the crowd, performing on the stage while audiences with floor "seats" mosh and listen from below. The show took more than eight months of planning as he traveled across the world to get insights from some of the best stage designers. On the later visits on this tour, West would go on rants about people including Jay-Z and Mark Zuckerberg instead of performing songs. This culminated in the tour being cancelled on November 21, along with West's admission to Ronald Reagan UCLA Medical Center.
2026–2027	Ye Live Concert Tour	April 1, 2026 – March 19, 2027	21
The Ye Live Concert Tour in support of Bully featured a globe-like stage. The tour commenced in Los Angeles, California at SoFi Stadium on April 1 and 3. The first night grossed over $18 million, making it one of the highest-grossing single shows in live music history. West was planned to headline Wireless Festival in Finsbury Park, London, from July 10-12; on April 7, after Prime Minister Keir Starmer, along with other British politicians, condemned West's planned appearances, the Home Office announced that West was blocked from visiting the United Kingdom. Wireless later announced the cancellation of the entire festival for 2026. On May 30, West held a concert at Atatürk Olympic Stadium in Istanbul, Turkey. The concert had over 118,000 people in attendance, making it West's largest performance of his career. West claimed that he had broken the record for the "largest stadium performance of all time."

== Concert residencies ==
Dates	Location	Shows	Country	Notes
July 6–7, 2012	Revel Casino Hotel Atlantic City	2	United States	West played two exclusive shows at Atlantic City's Revel Resort and Casino's Ovation Hall in time for the opening of its 40,000-square-foot HQ Nightclub. The performance was divided into three acts. Pusha T was the only guest, coming out during "Runaway" on the first night, and "New God Flow" on the second night.
December 28–30, 2012	Revel Casino Hotel Atlantic City	4	United States	The performances featured widescreen projections of nature scenes, which also served as interludes with their sound effects. He wore two masks: a diamond encrusted one and a yeti one. On this tour, West announced publicly that his partner Kim Kardashian was pregnant.
March 7–10, 2015	Louis Vuitton Foundation	4	France	The funds raised went to two charity associations: "Nos quartiers ont des talents" and Donda's House.

== Operas ==
Name	Date	Location	Country	Notes
Nebuchadnezzar	November 24, 2019	Hollywood Bowl	United States	Directed by Vanessa Beecroft and featuring the Sunday Service Choir, The plot centered on the religious text about Babylonian king, Nebuchadnezzar, from the Book of Daniel. The performance was livestreamed by Tidal. It was narrated by West and starred Sheck Wes in the lead role.
Mary	December 8, 2019	Miami Marine Stadium	United States	Once again directed by Vanessa Beecroft and featuring the Sunday Service Choir. Kanye and the choir performed on a floating barge at the Key Biscayne waterfront, where they stood between sand-colored mounds and reenacted excerpts from the books of Matthew and Luke, everyone was head-to-toe in silver—even their faces and hands were coated in metallic paint. Kanye read gospel passages aloud, much like he did in Nebuchadnezzar, except this time he was among the performers. Mary featured new arrangements of older Kanye songs that were paired with the plot. The show lasted for approximately one hour.

== Promotional concerts ==
Year	Title	Duration	Shows
2015	808s & Heartbreak at the Hollywood Bowl	September 25, 2015 – September 26, 2015 (Los Angeles, California)	2
808s & Heartbreak at the Hollywood Bowl was a two-day event hosted by Kanye West on September 25 and 26, 2015. West performed the entirety of his fourth studio album, 808s & Heartbreak (2008), at the Hollywood Bowl in Los Angeles, California.
2024	Vultures Listening Experience	August 23 – September 28, 2024	3
The events were held at the Wuyuan River Sports Stadium in Haikou, Hainan province, China And Goyang Stadium in Seoul, South Korea.
2026	Bully Listening Events	March 26 – April 23, 2026	
West held multiple listening events around the world in support of his twelfth studio album, Bully. The first events in South Korea and China were cancelled due to West mastering the album. West live streamed the album's listening party in Los Angeles on March 27, the day the album was supposed to release, with most songs from the album being played. Bully released a day later on March 28. A listening event in Jakarta took place on April 23, with a concert in Indonesia being announced at the event.

== Performances at festivals ==
Date	Event	Country	Notes	Ref.
June 12, 2004	Summer Jam	United States	West was backed by a gospel choir and supported by John Legend, who played the keyboard and provided backup vocals.	
July 23, 2004	Reggae Sumfest	Jamaica		
May 18, 2005	Sasquatch! Music Festival	United States		
June 5, 2005	Summer Jam	United States	West brought out Jay-Z during his performance of "Diamonds From Sierra Leone".	
August 14, 2005	Marc Ecko's Getting Up Festival	Canada		
April 29, 2006	Coachella Festival	United States	West was added to the lineup only two days before the festival.	
May 27, 2006	HFStival	United States		
June 30, 2006	Rock Werchter	Belgium		
July 1, 2006	Roskilde Festival	Denmark		
July 4, 2006	Quart Festival	Norway		
July 7, 2006	Open'er Festival	Poland		
July 16, 2006	North Sea Jazz Festival	Netherlands		
July 20, 2006	Stockholm Jazz Festival	Sweden	West, backed by a twenty-person string orchestra, performed selected hits and a variety of covers, including Gnarls Barkley's "Crazy", The Beatles' "Eleanor Rigby", Al Green's "Let's Stay Together", The Verve's "Bittersweet Symphony", and a-ha's "Take on Me".	
July 21, 2006	Pori Jazz	Finland		
August 4, 2006	Street Scene Festival	United States		
August 5, 2006	Lollapalooza	United States	West brought out GLC, Twista, Common and Lupe Fiasco. Also, his string section covered Gnarls Barkley's "Crazy" and The Verve's "Bittersweet Symphony".	
September 3, 2006	Bumbershoot	United States		
June 3, 2007	Summer Jam	United States	West had a beat battle with Swizz Beatz.	
March 31 – April 1, 2007	Springroove	Japan		
July 13, 2007	Festival d'été de Québec	Canada		
July 14, August	Ottawa Bluesfest	Canada		
August 11, 2007	Way Out West	Sweden		
August 12, 2007	Marktrock	Belgium		
August 18–19, 2007	V Festival	United Kingdom	West paid tribute to Amy Winehouse, who pulled out of the festival due to exhaustion.	
October 25, 2007	Desert Rhythm Festival	United Arab Emirates		
February 9, 16, 17, 2008	Good Vibrations Festival	Australia		
April 5, 2008	Springroove	Japan	Part of "World Wide Bape Heads Show 2008 (Reprise) in Springroove".	
June 1, 2008	Summer Jam	United States	West came out during Lil Wayne's set to perform his remix of Wayne's song "Lollipop". During his set, he brought out Consequence and Young Jeezy. Towards the end of his set, West apologized for not living up to his own high standards.	
June 14, 2008	Bonnaroo Music Festival	United States	West arrived on stage over an hour and a half late, and was thoroughly booed and jeered. There were massive complications with the stage setup. On his blog, West described the ordeal as "the worst insult I've ever had in my life".	
July 4, 2008	Essence Music Festival	United States		
July 25, 2008	Global Gathering	United Kingdom		
August 3, 2008	Lollapalooza	United States		
August 10, 2008	Virgin Festival	United States	West came out during Lil Wayne's set to perform his remix of Wayne's song "Lollipop".	
October 22 & October 24, 2008	Tim Festival	Brazil		
March 21, 2009	South by Southwest	United States	The event was a G.O.O.D. Music showcase, and featured Common, Erykah Badu, Kid Cudi, Mr Hudson, Fonzworth Bentley, 88 Keys, Big Sean, Consequence, GLC and Really Doe.	
July 2, 2009	Roskilde Festival	Denmark		
July 3, 2009	Main Square Festival	France		
July 4, 2009	Eurockéennes	France		
July 5, 2009	Wireless Festival	United Kingdom		
July 7, 2009	Apple Music Festival	United Kingdom	West came out during Mr Hudson's set and performed "Heartless", "Paranoid" and "Supernova".	
July 8, 2009	Live at the Marquee	Ireland	West paid tribute to the recently passed Michael Jackson.	
July 10, 2009	Openair Frauenfeld	Switzerland		
June 11, 2010	Isle of Wight Festival	United Kingdom	Jay-Z brought West out to perform "Run This Town".	
August 4, 2010	Singfest	Singapore		
March 20, 2011	South by Southwest	United States	The performance was billed as: VEVO Presents: G.O.O.D. Music, and was opened by Mos Def, Big Sean, Pusha T, Mr Hudson, Cyhi the Prynce and John Legend. Jay-Z then came out later.	
April 3, 2011	Lollapalooza Chile	Chile	The first year of the festival.	
April 17, 2011	Coachella Festival	United States	West became the first rapper to close the festival.	
May 20, 2011	Mawazine Festival	Morocco		
June 30, 2011	Summerfest	United States	Kid Cudi came out to perform "Erase Me" and "Make Her Say".	
July 2, 2011	Essence Music Festival	United States		
July 16, 2011	The Brooklyn Hip-Hop Festival	United States	West made a surprise appearance during Q-Tip's performance. He performed "Dark Fantasy", "All of the Lights", "Can't Tell Me Nothing", and "Award Tour" with Q-Tip.	
July 29, 2011	Splendour in the Grass	Australia		
August 3–5, 2011	Meo Sudoeste	Portugal		
August 6, 2011	The Big Chill	United Kingdom	West paid tribute to the recently deceased Amy Winehouse, performing covers of her songs "Back to Black" and "Tears Dry on Their Own".	
August 9, 2011	Bergen Calling Festival	Norway		
August 10–11, 2011	Øyafestivalen	Norway		
August 11, 2011	Tivoli Gardens	Denmark		
August 13, 2011	Way Out West Festival	Sweden		
August 14, 2011	Flow Festival	Finland		
August 20, 2011	Coke Live Music Festival	Poland		
September 16, 2011	Austin City Limits Music Festival	United States		
November 11, 2011	SWU Music & Arts Festival	Brazil	Fergie came out to perform "All of the Lights".	
June 23, 2012	BBC Radio 1's Big Weekend	United Kingdom	West was a surprise guest during Jay-Z's headlining performance, the duo performed "Otis", "Gotta Have It", "Who Gon Stop Me", "No Church in the Wild", "Lift Off" and "Niggas in Paris".	
January 22, 26, 29, 2012	Big Day Out	Australia		
September 1, 2012	Made in America Festival	United States		
June 9, 2013	Governors Ball Music Festival	United States	Live debut of "On Sight", "Send It Up" and "I Am a God".	
August 5, 2013	OVO Fest	Canada	West said Drake inspired him and Jay-Z to make Watch the Throne due to the pressure he was putting on them.	
November 9, 2013	Camp Flog Gnaw Carnival	United States	West made a surprise appearance during Tyler, the Creator's set. He opened with "New Slaves" before performing "Late" for the first time in six years alongside Tyler, the Creator, who stated it was his favorite West song.	
June 7, 2014	X Games	United States		
June 13, 2014	Bonnaroo Festival	United States		
June 28, 2014	Bråvalla Festival	Sweden		
July 2, 2014	Marlay Park	Ireland		
July 4–6, 2014	Wireless Festival	United Kingdom	West filled in for Drake, who suffered an illness. West made infamous rants during his three performances.	
August 8, 2014	Outside Lands	United States		
August 30–31, 2014	Made in America Festival	United States	West headlined both the Philadelphia and Los Angeles incarnations.	
September 21, 2014	AAHH! Fest	United States	The first annual AAHH! Fest, West was a surprise performer.	
October 24, 2014	Life Is Beautiful Festival	United States		
February 12, 2015	Roc City Classic	United States	The first annual Roc City Classic, West performed with Travis Scott, Big Sean, Pusha T, 2 Chainz, and bought out Fetty Wap to perform "Trap Queen".	
April 18, 2015	Coachella Festival	United States	West made a surprise appearance during The Weeknd's headlining set. He performed "Can't Tell Me Nothing", "I Don't Like (Remix)", "All Day" and "Black Skinhead".	
May 9, 2015	Wango Tango	United States		
May 16, 2015	Power 106 Powerhouse	United States		
June 20, 2015	Atlanta Birthday Bash	United States	2 Chainz came out to perform "Mercy" and "Birthday Song".	
June 27, 2015	Glastonbury Festival	United Kingdom	West became the second rapper, after Jay-Z in 2009, to headline the festival. Over 100,000 people signed an online petition to prevent West from headlining the festival.	
July 10, 2015	Ottawa Bluesfest	Canada		
August 2, 2015	OVO Fest	Canada		
August 22, 2015	FYF Fest	United States	West was only announced as the festival's Saturday night headliner on Thursday evening after Frank Ocean pulled out of his performance. Travis Scott came out and performed "Upper Echelon"’ and "Antidote" during the set. Rihanna sang the hook for "FourFiveSeconds" while in the pit, and later joined him on stage for a performance of "All of the Lights".	
September 18, 2015	iHeartRadio Music Festival	United States	West's first performance at the festival.	
September 27, 2015	Summer's End Festival	United States	Vic Mensa and Travis Scott both made appearances on stage with West. Scott and West played "Piss On Your Grave" for the first time.	
April 9, 2016	Paradise International Music Festival	Philippines	This was the first year of the festival.	
June 6, 2016	Summer Jam	United States	This was a last minute replacement performance as West was due to perform at Governors Ball instead, but it was cancelled due to adverse weather conditions. The performance was a G.O.O.D. Music showcase, featuring Big Sean, Pusha T, 2 Chainz, Travis Scott and Desiigner all on stage together.	
July 30, 2016	OVO Fest	Canada	West was a surprise performer, he also teased a collaboration album with Drake.	
September 24, 2016	Magnificent Coloring Day Festival	United States	West was made a surprise appearance and caused pandemonium with his arrival, he performed "Gold Digger", "Can't Tell Me Nothing", "All Day", "Black Skinhead", "Father Stretch My Hands, Pt. 1 and Pt. 2", "All Falls Down" and "Ultralight Beam".	
October 2, 2016	The Meadows Music & Arts Festival	United States	West cut his performance short after being informed that his wife, Kim Kardashian, had been robbed at gunpoint in Paris.	
November 1, 2018	Camp Flog Gnaw Carnival	United States	The first official Kids See Ghosts performance, West later tweeted that the festival made him delay the release of his next album, Yandhi.	
April 21, 2019	Coachella Festival	United States	West made an appearance during Kid Cudi's headlining set on Saturday night, before hosting a special "Sunday Service" set on the morning of Easter Sunday. The set, which took place on a large grass hill created for the performance, featured West's Sunday Service Choir and an accompanying band, as well as appearances by Kid Cudi, Teyana Taylor, and Chance the Rapper. DMX delivered a spoken-word prayer towards the end of the set.	
November 9, 2019	Astroworld Festival	United States	West made a surprise appearance during Travis Scott's headlining set, performing "Follow God" and "Can't Tell Me Nothing".	
December 12, 2021	Rolling Loud California	United States	West made a surprise appearance during Future's headlining set.	
July 22, 2022	Rolling Loud Miami	United States	Ye was supposed to headline but canceled shortly before, and Kid Cudi became the headliner. Cudi's performance was booed and shut down after 20 minutes. Lil Durk ended up bringing out Ye to perform "Father Stretch My Hands, Pt. 1".	
August 7, 2023	Circus Maximus	Italy	Ye made a surprise appearance at Travis Scott's "Circus Maximus" performance in Rome, Italy. He performed "Praise God" and "Can't Tell Me Nothing" with Scott.	
March 14, 2024	Rolling Loud California	United States	West performed together with collaborator Ty Dolla Sign, performing songs from their recently released collaborative album Vultures 1. Ye and Ty Dolla Sign performed most of the tracks off of the aforementioned album, with Ye later playing his own songs such as "Father Stretch My Hands, Pt. 1", "Can't Tell Me Nothing", "Runaway" and "Niggas In Paris".	

== Award show performances ==
Date	Event	Country	Performed song(s)	Ref.
June 19, 2004	2004 MuchMusic Video Awards	Canada	"Jesus Walks"	
June 29, 2004	2004 BET Awards	United States	"Jesus Walks" (with Yolanda Adams)	
August 14, 2004	2004 MTV Video Music Awards	United States	"Jesus Walks", "All Falls Down", "Through the Wire" (with Chaka Khan)	
August 27, 2004	2004 BMI Awards	United States	Unknown	
September 15, 2004	2004 World Music Awards	United States	Unknown	
November 14, 2004	2004 American Music Awards	United States	"The New Workout Plan", "Slow Jamz" (with Twista & Jamie Foxx)	
February 13, 2005	2005 Grammy Awards	United States	"I'll Fly Away", "Jesus Walks" (with Mavis Staples, John Legend & The Blind Boys of Alabama)	
August 28, 2005	2005 MTV Video Music Awards	United States	"Gold Digger" (with Jamie Foxx)	
September 26, 2005	2005 VH1 Hip Hop Honors	United States	"Gold Digger", "Hypnotize" (The Notorious B.I.G. Cover)	
February 8, 2006	2006 Grammy Awards	United States	"Gold Digger", "Touch the Sky"	
February 14, 2006	2006 Brit Awards	United Kingdom	"Diamonds from Sierra Leone", "Gold Digger", "Touch the Sky"	
September 9, 2007	2007 MTV Video Music Awards	United States	"Stronger", "Touch the Sky", "Champion","Can't Tell Me Nothing", "I Wonder", "Good Life" (with T-Pain), "Gold Digger" (with Jamie Foxx)	
October 13, 2007	2007 BET Hip Hop Awards	United States	"Can't Tell Me Nothing", "Good Life" (with T-Pain)	
February 10, 2008	2008 Grammy Awards	United States	"Stronger" (with Daft Punk), "Hey Mama"	
June 24, 2008	2008 BET Awards	United States	"Put On" (with Jeezy)	
September 7, 2008	2008 MTV Video Music Awards	United States	"Love Lockdown"	
November 6, 2008	2008 MTV Europe Music Awards	United States	"Love Lockdown", "American Boy" (with Estelle)	
November 23, 2008	2008 American Music Awards	United States	"Heartless"	
February 8, 2009	2009 Grammy Awards	United States	"American Boy" (with Estelle), "Swagga Like Us" (with Jay-Z, T.I. & Lil Wayne)	
June 27, 2010	2010 BET Awards	United States	"Power"	
November 7, 2010	2010 MTV Europe Music Awards	Spain	"Hurricane" (with Thirty Seconds to Mars), "Power"	
November 10, 2010	2010 MTV Video Music Awards	United States	"Runaway" (with Pusha T)	
August 28, 2011	2011 MTV Video Music Awards	United States	"Otis" (with Jay-Z)	
July 1, 2012	2012 BET Awards	United States	"Mercy" (with Big Sean, Pusha T & 2 Chainz), "Cold", "New God Flow"	
August 25, 2013	2013 MTV Video Music Awards	United States	"Blood on the Leaves"	
February 8, 2015	2015 Grammy Awards	United States	"FourFiveSeconds" (with Rihanna & Paul McCartney), "Only One"	
February 25, 2015	2015 Brit Awards	United Kingdom	"All Day" (with Theophilus London & Allan Kingdom)	
May 17, 2015	2015 Billboard Music Awards	United States	"All Day", "Black Skinhead"	

== Performances on television shows ==
Date	Event	Country	Performed song(s)	Ref.
May 9, 2003	Def Poetry Jam	United States	"Self Conscious"	
February 6, 2004	106 & Park	United States	"Through the Wire"	
February 12, 2004	106 & Park	United States	"Slow Jamz" (with Twista & Jamie Foxx)	
February 16, 2004	Late Show with David Letterman	United States	"All Falls Down" (with Miri Ben-Ari, Syleena Johnson & John Legend)	
February 20, 2004	Last Call with Carson Daly	United States	"Through the Wire" (with Miri Ben-Ari & John Legend)	
March 3, 2004	Chappelle's Show	United States	"The Food" (with Common)	
March 31, 2004	Total Request Live	United States	"All Falls Down" (with Syleena Johnson)	
March 31, 2004	Chappelle's Show	United States	"Two Words" (with Freeway & Mos Def)	
April 28, 2004	106 & Park	United States	"This Way" (with Dilated Peoples)	
June 18, 2004	Top of the Pops	United Kingdom	"All Falls Down" (with Syleena Johnson)	
June 26, 2004	Jimmy Kimmel Live!	United States	Unknown	
July 25, 2004	Def Poetry Jam	United States	"18 Years"	
October 1, 2004	Later... with Jools Holland	United Kingdom	"All Falls Down" (with Miri Ben-Ari, Syleena Johnson & John Legend)	
July 11, 2005	Top of the Pops	United Kingdom	"Diamonds From Sierra Leone"	
July 22, 2005	Def Poetry Jam	United States	"Bittersweet"	
August 18, 2005	Wild 'n Out	United States	"Diamonds From Sierra Leone"	
September 9, 2005	The Oprah Winfrey Show	United States	"Hey Mama"	
October 1, 2005	Saturday Night Live	United States	"Gold Digger", "Touch the Sky", "Heard 'Em Say" (with Adam Levine)	
May 1, 2006	Late Show with David Letterman	United States	Unknown	
May 5, 2006	Ellen in the Park	United States	"Impossible" (with Twista & Keyshia Cole)	
May 11, 2006	The Tonight Show with Jay Leno	United States	"Impossible" (with Twista & Keyshia Cole)	
August 4, 2006	Good Morning America	United States	"Number One" (with Pharrell Williams)	
August 4, 2006	The Early Show	United States	"Number One" (with Pharrell Williams)	
January 26, 2007	Music Station	Japan	"I Still Love H.E.R." (with Teriyaki Boyz)	
August 8, 2007	106 & Park	United States	Unknown	
September 6, 2007	Today	United States	Unknown	
September 11, 2007	106 & Park	United States	"Big Brother"	
September 14, 2007	The Ellen DeGeneres Show	United States	"Stronger"	
September 29, 2007	Saturday Night Live	United States	"Stronger", "Good Life", "Champion", "Everything I Am"	
September 29, 2008	The Ellen DeGeneres Show	United States	"Love Lockdown"	
October 15, 2008	Jimmy Kimmel Live!	United States	"Love Lockdown", "Champion", "Good Life"	
November 24, 2008	Late Show with David Letterman	United States	"Love Lockdown"	
November 24, 2008	106 & Park	United States	"Amazing" (with Young Jeezy)	
November 25, 2008	Good Morning America	United States	"Heartless", "Touch the Sky"	
November 26, 2008	Late Night with Conan O'Brien	United States	"Heartless"	
December 13, 2008	Saturday Night Live	United States	"Love Lockdown", "Heartless", "Pinocchio Story"	
March 12, 2009	American Idol	United States	"Heartless"	
May 4, 2009	Late Show with David Letterman	United States	"Knock You Down" (with Keri Hilson)	
July 12, 2009	Alan Carr: Chatty Man	United Kingdom	"Supernova" (with Mr Hudson)	
September 14, 2009	The Tonight Show with Jay Leno	United States	"Run This Town" (with Jay-Z & Rihanna)	
October 2, 2010	Saturday Night Live	United States	"Power", "Runaway" (with Pusha T)	
April 21, 2011	American Idol	United States	"E.T." (with Katy Perry)	
April 21, 2011	106 & Park	United States	"Marvin & Chardonnay" (with Big Sean)	
November 9, 2011	Victoria's Secret Fashion Show 2011	United States	"Stronger", "Niggas in Paris" (with Jay-Z)	
May 18, 2013	Saturday Night Live	United States	"Black Skinhead", "New Slaves"	
September 10, 2013	The Tonight Show Starring Jimmy Fallon	United States	"Bound 2"	
March 6, 2014	The Arsenio Hall Show	United States	"Sanctified" (with Big Sean & Rick Ross)	
September 23, 2013	Le Grand Journal	France	"Black Skinhead"	
September 23, 2013	Later... With Jools Holland	United Kingdom	"Bound 2", New Slaves, Blood on the Leaves	
September 25, 2014	Late Night with Seth Meyers	United States	"Jesus Walks", "Touch The Sky", "Stronger", "Heartless", "All of the Lights", "Mercy", "Black Skinhead"	
February 15, 2015	Saturday Night Live	United States	"Jesus Walks", "Wolves" (with Vic Mensa & Sia), "Only One"	
February 27, 2015	Skavlan	Norway	"Only One"	
March 15, 2015	The Jonathan Ross Show	United Kingdom	"Only One"	
February 13, 2016	Saturday Night Live	United States	"Highlights" (with Young Thug), "Ultralight Beam" (with Chance the Rapper, Kirk Franklin, Kelly Price & The-Dream)	
September 29, 2018	Saturday Night Live	United States	"I Love It" (with Lil Pump), "We Got Love" (with Teyana Taylor), and "Ghost Town" (with Kid Cudi & 070 Shake)	
October 25, 2019	Jimmy Kimmel Live	United States	"Closed On Sunday"	

== Performances on specials ==
Date	Event	Country	Notes	Ref.
July 17, 2004	Pepsi Smash	United States	"Jesus Walks", "Through the Wire"	
July 7, 2004	Nokia Presents: Hard Rock Live	United States	Unknown	
September 18, 2004	Dave Chappelle's Block Party	United States	"Get Em High", "Spaceship" "Jesus Walks", "All Falls Down"	
February 3, 2005	Pepsi Smash Super Bowl Bash	United States	Unknown	
July 2, 2005	Live 8 concert, Philadelphia	United States	"Diamonds (From Sierra Leone)", "All Falls Down", "Jesus Walks"	
September 7, 2005	MTV2 $2 Bill Concert Series	United States	Unknown	
September 8, 2005	NFL Kickoff Game	United States	"Heard 'Em Say" (with Maroon 5)	
September 9, 2005	Shelter from the Storm: A Concert for the Gulf Coast	United States	"Jesus Walks"	
September 21, 2005	Late Orchestration	United Kingdom		
September 26, 2005	2nd VH1 Hip Hop Honors	United States	"Gold Digger" and "Hypnotize" (The Notorious B.I.G. cover)	
December 5, 2005	MTV's Life & Rhymes of Kanye West	United States		
December 31, 2005	MTV New Year's	United States	Unknown	
February 1, 2007	Pepsi Smash Super Bowl Bash	United States	Unknown	
July 1, 2007	Concert for Diana	United Kingdom	"Gold Digger", "Touch the Sky", "Stronger", "Diamonds from Sierra Leone", "Jesus Walks"	
July 1, 2007	Live Earth Concert	United States	"Heard 'Em Say", "All Falls Down", "Gold Digger", "Stronger", "Diamonds from Sierra Leone", "Can't Tell Me Nothing", "Jesus Walks" and "Touch the Sky"	
August 21, 2007	BET Presents: The Education of Kanye West	United States		
November 7, 2007	Vodophone TBA - Kanye West	United Kingdom		
February 28, 2009	VH1 Storytellers	United States		
June 29, 2009	Ellen's Bigger, Longer & Wider Show	United States	"Stronger", "Heartless"	
July 7, 2009	iTunes Festival	United Kingdom	"Heartless", "Paranoid", "Supernova" (all with Mr Hudson)	
July 25, 2009	Fuse Presents: Kanye West Live from The Chicago Theatre	United States	This was a "Stay in School" benefit concert, sponsored by the Kanye West Foundation S.H.O.W. (Students Helping Our World), a charity organization established in the honor of West's late mother, Dr. Donda West. West's Foundation S.H.O.W. partners with schools and community organizations to give underprivileged youth access to music production and academic support programs.	
September 11, 2009	Jay-Z Live from Madison Square Garden: Answer the Call	United States	"Run This Town" (with Jay-Z & Rihanna), "Can't Tell Me Nothing", "Good Life"	
November 25, 2010	Macy's Thanksgiving Day Parade	United States	"Lost in the World"	
February 20, 2011	2011 NBA All-Star Game	United States	"All of the Lights" (with Rihanna)	
December 21, 2012	12-12-12: The Concert for Sandy Relief	United States	"Clique", "Mercy", "Power", "Jesus Walks", "All of the Lights", "Run This Town", "Diamonds from Sierra Leone", "Diamonds Remix", "Touch the Sky", "Gold Digger", "Good Life", "Runaway", "Stronger"	
December 2, 2014	U2's World AIDS Day Concert	United States	"Power", "Black Skinhead", "Stronger","Jesus Walks", "Touch the Sky"	
July 26, 2015	2015 Pan American Games	Canada	"Stronger", "Power", "Black Skinhead", "Can't Tell Me Nothing"", "Gold Digger," "Touch the Sky", "All of the Lights", "Good Life"	

== Other performances ==
Date	Event	Country	Notes	Ref.
December 11, 2004	Grammy Jam	United States	West performed "September" with Raphael Saadiq, during an evening of performances by a variety of musicians, celebrating the musical group Earth, Wind & Fire in support of music and arts education.	
December 6, 2005	Z100 Jingle Ball 2005	United States	West was backed by a harpist and a string section during the performance.	
December 12, 2008	Z100 Jingle Ball 2008	United States		
December 14, 2008	KROQ Almost Acoustic Christmas	United States		
January 20, 2009	Youth Inaugural Ball	United States	West dedicated changed lyrics to numerous songs to pay tribute to then newly elected 44th President of the United States, Barack Obama.	
August 5, 2009	G-Shock The World	United States		
September 13, 2010	The Home & Home Tour	United States	Jay-Z brought out West during the second of two shows of The Home & Home Tour at Yankee Stadium. The two performed "Run This Town", "Power Remix", "Monster", "Can't Tell Me Nothing" and "Good Life".	
November 12, 2010	2010 Abu Dhabi Grand Prix	United Arab Emirates	West's first live performance of "All of the Lights".	
November 23, 2010	Secret Bowery Ballroom Show	United States	This was a celebration of the just released My Beautiful Dark Twisted Fantasy. West performed the album in its entirety to a crowd of 575 people. Nicki Minaj, Rick Ross, Justin Vernon, Teyana Taylor, Pusha T, and John Legend made appearances. Tickets went on sale at noon on the day of the performance, driving secondary-market prices into the thousands.	
November 25, 2010	Fool's Gold Records Third anniversary party	United States		
June 9, 2011	G.O.O.D Music Heineken Red Star Access show	United States	The performance was for the launch of the Heineken Red Star Access tour, an annual summer program that showcases music's hottest and freshest experiences nationwide.	
September 3, 2011	Call of Duty: Experience 2011	United States	Kid Cudi came out during "All of the Lights".	
October 24, 2012	Samsung Galaxy Note II Launch	United States	French Montana, T.I., Kid Cudi, Meek Mill, Jennifer Hudson were in the audience. West brought out 2 Chainz to perform "Birthday Song".	
May 6, 2013	Met Gala	United States	West debuted "I Am a God".	
May 15, 2013	Private Adult Swim Upfront Event	United States	West performed the unreleased song "Awesome".	
June 20, 2014	Dave Chappelle stand-up at Radio City Music Hall	United States	West made a surprise appearance at Dave Chappelle's Radio City Music Hall gig, performing "New Slaves", "Jesus Walks" and "Gold Digger".	
January 31, 2015	DirecTV Super Saturday Night 2015	United States	West made surprise appearance during Rihanna's performance, coming out to perform "All of the Lights" and "Run this Town" with Rihanna, who then left the stage for West to do a ten-minute set, before she rejoined the stage for a performance of "Diamonds Remix". West acted as hype man for several of Rihanna solo performances. The concert also saw the live debut of West's single "Only One".	
February 7, 2015	Big Sean Pre-GRAMMY Concert	United States	West performed "I Don't Like (Remix)", "Blessings" and "Clique" with Big Sean, before performing "Black Skinhead" and "Can't Tell Me Nothing".	
March 4, 2015	Secret Koko London show	United Kingdom	The show was announced only hours prior to the performance. West shared the stage with local grime artists Skepta, JME, Novelist and Meridian Dan, as well as, Cyhi the Prynce, Big Sean, Vic Mensa and Raekwon.	
April 12, 2015	Armenian Swan Lake	Armenia	He performed a medley of his greatest hits. Armenian Police shut down the impromptu free concert after West jumped into a lake, causing fans to chase after him.	
April 21, 2015	Time 100	United States	West performed a 20-minute medley consisting of "All Day", "Black Skinhead", "New Slaves", "Blood on the Leaves", "Runaway", "Only One", "Gold Digger", "Good Life" and "Touch the Sky". He started the set with James Brown's "It's a Man's Man's Man's World", and was surrounded by naked men covered in chalk.	
May 10, 2015	Chicago Bulls vs Cleveland Cavaliers Playoff Game	United States	West performed "All Day" during a timeout in the first quarter.	
May 12, 2015	Chance the Rapper's Open Mike	United States	West performed "All Day" and "We Don't Care" alongside Chance the Rapper and Vic Mensa during Chance the Rapper's closed-door open mic event for high schoolers of Chicago.	
September 25–26, 2015	808s & Heartbreak at Hollywood Bowl	United States	West performed 808s & Heartbreak in its entirety during two nights at Hollywood Bowl. The performance featured a full orchestral string section, background singers, an electronic band and 14 women dressed in solemn chador-style garments. Album guest's Kid Cudi and Mr. Hudson were present on both nights, Young Jeezy appeared the first night, Caroline Shaw provided background vocals for a bulk of the songs. The show featured constant fireworks, a large array of chalk painted men, and a gold painted Zoë Kravitz.	
October 10, 2015	Ramat Gan Stadium	Israel	West performed the entirety of "Jesus Walks" while on his knees as a sign of respect.	
October 10, 2015	DNC Fundraiser	United States	The fundraiser was billed as "an afternoon concert" that was hosted at the Warfield—a 2,300 seat venue—with tickets selling for between $250 and $10,000.	
December 6, 2018	XXXTentacion Skins Album Release Party	United States	West made a surprise appearance at the release party. West performed "One Minute" for the first time, alongside "Black Skinhead", "Can't Tell Me Nothing", "Father Stretch My Hands", and "Blood on the Leaves."	
December 9, 2021	Free Larry Hoover Benefit Concert	United States	West performed numerous songs along with special guest Drake at the L.A. Coliseum to raise awareness for Larry Hoover. The event was livestreamed by Amazon via Prime Video and Twitch, along with theatrical screenings.	
August 23, 2024	Vultures Listening Experience	South Korea	West performed numerous songs along with his ¥$ partner Ty Dolla Sign. West's daughters, North and Chicago, also made a special appearance on the stage. The performance was livestreamed on West's YouTube channel.	
September 15–28, 2024	Vultures Listening Experience	China	The event was held at the Wuyuan River Sports Stadium in Haikou, Hainan province	
July 12, 2025	Ye Live in China	China	Held at Shanghai Stadium	
July 26, 2025	Ye Live in Korea	South Korea	Held at Goyang Stadium	
November 7, 2025	Circus Maximus Tour	Japan	West made a surprise appearance at Travis Scott's concert in Tokyo, Japan as part of Scott's Circus Maximus Tour, performing the songs "Flashing Lights", "Stronger", "Runaway", "Can't Tell Me Nothing", "All of the Lights", "Through the Wire", "Heartless", "Father Stretch My Hands Pt. 1" and "Carnival".	
January 30–31, 2026	Ye Live in Mexico	Mexico	The two concerts were held at the Monumental Plaza de Toros in Mexico City. West performed numerous songs of his discography, while his daughter North made special appearances on the stage, debuting her single "Piercing on My Hand". Both dates were livestreamed by TelevisaUnivision via Vix.	
October 5, 2026	ComplexCon	United States	West performed as a special guest to Playboi Carti's set, performing "Can't Tell Me Nothing", "Carnival", and "Off the Grid".	

== Surprise/guest performances ==
Date	Event	Country	Notes	Ref.
October 3, 2004	Truth Tour	United States	West came out and perfrmed his verse on the Confessions Part II remix at the State Farm Arena. The concert was filmed and released on DVD; The Truth Tour: Behind The Tour.	
