= It's You (Duck Sauce song) =

Song by American–Canadian DJ duo Duck Sauce

Single by Duck Sauce

from the album Quack
- Released: June 25, 2013
- Recorded: 2013
- Genre: Nu-disco; electro swing; funky house
- Length: 3:10 (album version); 2:40 (video edit)
- Label: Republic; Casablanca; 3 Beat; Fool's Gold
- Songwriters: Alain Macklovitch; Armand Van Helden
- Producer: Duck Sauce

Duck Sauce singles chronology
"Big Bad Wolf" (2011)	"It's You" (2013)	"Radio Stereo" (2013)

Music video
- "It's You" on YouTube

"It's You" is a song by American–Canadian DJ duo Duck Sauce. The song was released as a single on June 25, 2013. A music video was uploaded to the duo's Vevo channel on YouTube on the same day. A slightly altered and longer version of the song was later featured on the duo's debut studio album Quack. The song has peaked at number 46 on the Belgian Flanders Tip singles chart, number 19 on the Belgian Wallonia Tip singles chart, and number 47 on the French Singles Chart. The song samples "It's You" by Bruce Patch.

== Composition ==
The song is in the key of C major and is played at 128 beats per minute.

The composition centers around the sample of It's You by Bruce Patch, a barbershop-style 12-bar blues song also in C major. The sample is sped up to double time of 256 BPM, meaning 4 beats of the original sample last 2 beats of the finished song. Synthesized instruments and drums support the sample and make the sound richer and more electronic.

Parts of the sample are repeated to align the 12-bar sections into the expected 8-bar structure of an EDM track. In the vocal portions, the 9th and 10th bars are repeated two more times, resulting in a chord progression of C-C-C-C-F-F-C-C-G-F-G-F-G-F-C-C. In contrast, in the instrumental portions, the 1st to 4th measures are duplicated after the 8th measure, resulting in a chord progression of C-C-C-C-F-F-C-C-C-C-C-C-G-F-C-C.

== Music video ==
The official music video for the song was uploaded on June 25, 2013, to the duo's Vevo channel on YouTube. The video takes place in a barbershop and is simply centered around the happenings of the barbershop. Chris Martins of Spin states that the video, "begins mundanely enough, with our musical hosts behind the clippers, trimming the ‘dos of various customers. But as the beat picks up, the hair begins to move with the rhythm — eyeballs, too, and soon the entire salon transforms. Eventually a disco ball emerges from a sizable Afro, black-light head designs are revealed, and rising foam envelops the clientele." The video received a nomination under the Best Visual Effects category at the 2013 MTV Video Music Awards, but it eventually lost to "Safe and Sound" by Capital Cities.

== Track listing ==
=== Digital download ===
Single release
No.	Title	Length
1.	"It's You"	3:00

=== Remixes ===
It's You – Remixes
No.	Title	Length
1.	"It's You" (Ridiculous Mix)	3:55
2.	"It's You" (Chris Lake Remix)	4:42
3.	"It's You" (Gregor Salto Remix)	3:11
4.	"It's You" (LiL TExAS Remix)	2:57
5.	"It's You" (Pascal & Pearce Remix)	5:02
6.	"It's You" (Suicide Kings Remix)	4:11
7.	"It's You" (DJ Snake Remix)	5:37
8.	"It's You" (DJ Godfather Ghetto Trap Remix)	3:01
9.	"It's You" (NT89 Feat. Jeff Fresco Remix)	5:07
10.	"It's You" (_@#! Remix)	3:49

== Charts ==
=== Weekly charts ===
Chart (2013)	Peak position
Belgium (Ultratip Bubbling Under Flanders)	46
Belgium (Ultratip Bubbling Under Wallonia)	19
France (SNEP)	32
US Hot Dance/Electronic Songs (Billboard)	21
US Dance Club Songs (Billboard)	6

=== Year-end charts ===
Chart (2013)	Position
US Hot Dance/Electronic Songs (Billboard)	86

== Release history ==
Region	Date	Label	Format	Catalogue no.
United States	June 25, 2013	Republic; Casablanca	Digital download (single)	—
United States	July 28, 2013	3 Beat	Digital download (remixes EP)	3BEAT143D
