= Duck Sauce =

Electronic music superduo

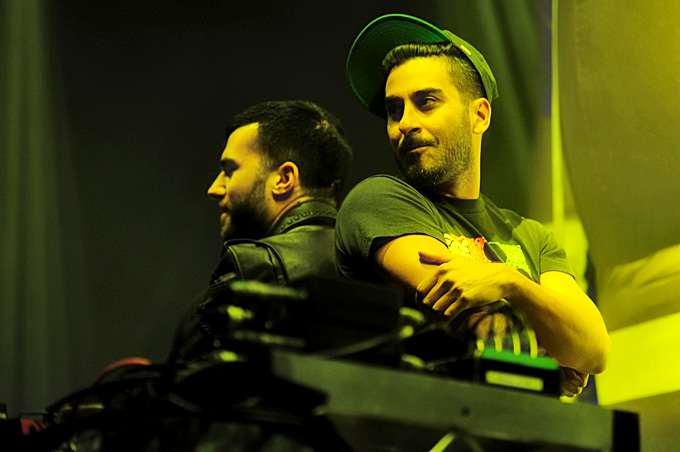
- Duck Sauce performing in 2011

Background information
- Origin: New York City, U.S.
- Genres: House; nu-disco; funky house
- Years active: 2009–present
- Labels: Fool's Gold; D4 D4NCE; Defected; Casablanca; Republic; 3 Beat; Spinnin'; Big Beat; All Around the World; Data
- Members: Armand van Helden; A-Trak
- Website: www.ducksaucenyc.com

Duck Sauce is an electronic music superduo, formed in 2009 in New York City. The duo consists of American DJ Armand van Helden and Canadian DJ A-Trak. They are best known for their 2010 single "Barbra Streisand".

The duo released a mixtape named Duck Tape in October 2013, and their album Quack in April 2014. Awards the duo has won are the Best Underground Dance Track in 2011 and 2012, and Best Dance Video – International in 2011.

== History ==
Duck Sauce's first tracks are "aNYway" and "You're Nasty". The track "aNYway" capitalizes "NY" to signify the duo's New York origins. The song was originally called "A New York Way" but was later shortened. The song samples "I Can Do It" by Final Edition. Duck Sauce's debut EP Greatest Hits was released on July 15, 2010.

In the summer of 2010, Duck Sauce released a track, "Barbra Streisand", named after the singer of the same name. The track heavily samples the 1979 song "Gotta Go Home" by Boney M., which itself is based upon "Hallo Bimmelbahn" by the German band Nighttrain, 1973. The famous hookline is written by Heinz Huth. "Barbra Streisand" was first played at Miami Winter Music Conference in 2010 and gained heavy DJ and radio support in the UK, Ireland, Germany, Norway, Austria, Poland, France, Finland, Romania, Australia, New Zealand, South Africa, and Sri Lanka. The song peaked at No. 3 on the UK Singles Chart and reached No. 1 on the Australian ARIA Club Chart as of 12 September 2010. For the Billboard week ending December 18, 2010, the song reached the #1 position on the Dance/Club Play Songs chart. On April 26, 2011, the song was featured in the musical television series Glee's 18th episode of their second season. The song was also featured in the Vitamin Water Revive commercial. The "Barbra Streisand" music video reached over 100 million total views.

"Big Bad Wolf" was released by Duck Sauce in 2011 on BBC Radio and samples wolves howling. The music video features genitalia replaced by human heads. A-Trak notes "When Keith came up with this idea of 'crotchfaces,' we just thought it was hilarious."

On June 6, 2013, announced via Facebook, a preview of the song "It's You" was shown, with the full song released on June 25, 2013. "It's You" samples the track of the same name from FirstCom's OneMusic library. The music video features a barber shop transformed into a surreal dance party which comes to life with the beat of the song. The music video earned Duck Sauce a nomination at the 2013 MTV Video Music Awards.

In October of the same year they released "Radio Stereo". The song is a rework of "Radio", a 1982 hit by UK punk act The Members. The original chorus, "We listen to the radio! It's better than the stereo", is looped over a driving, funky bass and playful sampling. Songwriter Nigel Bennett of The Members was quoted saying that he was happy that Duck Sauce discovered his song and loved what they've done with "Radio Stereo".

On October 12, 2013, they appeared on BBC Radio 1's Essential Mix. The first hour of that mix, which contained many unreleased demos, was later released as a mixtape titled Duck Tape. Four of these demos were released in January 2014 on the Duck Droppings EP.

On the Essential Mix broadcast Duck Sauce announced a full album, Quack, to be released through Fool's Gold Records in early 2014. The album features twelve songs by the duo, including "Barbra Streisand", "aNYway", "It's You", and "Radio Stereo". The album's lead single "NRG" samples Melissa Manchester's 1985 track "Energy" and was named Zane Lowe's "Hottest Record in the World" on April 3, 2014. The album was released on April 14, 2014.

On January 1, 2020, member A-Trak teased a comeback of Duck Sauce on his Twitter account. Later that week, it was revealed that the duo were to perform at Coachella that April. This ended up not taking place due to the cancellation of the event as a result of the COVID-19 pandemic. They subsequently performed at the 2022 edition of Coachella.

== Discography ==
=== Albums ===
Title	Details
Quack	Released: 14 April 2014; Label: Fool's Gold Records; Formats: Download, CD, LP

=== Extended plays ===
Title	Details
Greatest Hits	Released: 15 June 2010; Label: Fool's Gold Records; Formats: 12"
Duck Droppings	Released: 20 January 2014; Label: Fool's Gold Records; Formats: Download
Put The Sauce On It	Released: 20 April 2022; Label: D4 D4NCE, Defected Records; Formats: Download

=== Mixtapes ===
Title	Details
Duck Tape	Released: 30 October 2013; Label: Fool's Gold Records; Formats: Download, cassette

=== Singles ===
Year	Single	Peak chart positions											Certifications	Album
Year	Single	CAN	US	AUS	AUT	BEL (FL)	FRA	GER	IRE	NL	SWI	UK	Certifications	Album
2009	"aNYway"	—	—	56	—	26	38	—	—	49	—	22		Quack
2010	"Barbra Streisand"	35	89	9	1	1	3	3	2	1	1	3	ARIA: Platinum; BPI: Platinum; BVMI: Platinum; IFPI DEN: Platinum; IFPI FIN: Gold; MC: Platinum; RIAA: Gold	Quack
2011	"Big Bad Wolf"	—	—	—	—	16	—	—	—	—	—	79		Non-album single
2013	"It's You"	–	—	—	—	146	47	—	—	—	—	—		Quack
2013	"Radio Stereo"	—	—	—	—	—	—	—	—	—	—	—		Quack
2014	"NRG"	—	—	—	—	—	—	—	—	—	—	—		Quack
2020	"Smiley Face" / "Get to Steppin"	—	—	—	—	—	—	—	—	—	—	—		Non-album singles
2020	"Captain Duck" / "I Don't Mind"	—	—	—	—	—	—	—	—	—	—	—		Non-album singles
2021	"Ask Me" / "Mesmerize"	—	—	—	—	—	—	—	—	—	—	—		Put The Sauce On It EP
2021	"Nonchalant"	—	—	—	—	—	—	—	—	—	—	—		Put The Sauce On It EP
2023	"LALALA"	—	—	—	—	—	—	—	—	—	—	—		TBA
2024	"Clap Your Feet" / "2 Da Face"	—	—	—	—	—	—	—	—	—	—	—		TBA
2024	"Fallin' in Love"	—	—	—	—	—	—	—	—	—	—	—		TBA
"—" denotes a single that did not chart or was not released in that territory.

== Music videos ==
Title	Year	Director(s)
"aNYway"	2009	Eran Creevy
"Barbra Streisand"	2010	So Me
"Big Bad Wolf"	2011	Keith Schofield
"It's You"	2013	Philip Andelman
"NRG"	2014	Dugan O’Neal
"Mesmerize"	2020	Keith Schofield
"Nonchalant"	2021	Freeka Tet
"Clap Your Feet" (feat. Fuzzy Cufflinxxx)	2024	Harrison Fishman

== Awards and nominations ==
=== International Dance Music Awards ===
Year	Nominee / work	Award	Result
2011	"Barbra Streisand"	Best Break-Through Artist	Nominated
2011	"Barbra Streisand"	Best Best House/Garage Track	Nominated
2011	"Barbra Streisand"	Best Underground Dance Track	Won
2012	"Big Bad Wolf"		
2012	"Big Bad Wolf"	Best Music Video	Nominated
2012	"Big Bad Wolf"	Best Artist - Group	Nominated
2012	"Big Bad Wolf"	Best Underground Dance Track	Won

=== Grammy Awards ===
Year	Nominee / work	Award	Result
2012	"Barbra Streisand"	Best Dance Recording	Nominated

=== MTV Video Music Awards ===
Year	Nominee / work	Award	Result
2012	"Big Bad Wolf"	Best Electronic Dance Music Video	Nominated
2012	"Big Bad Wolf"	Best Direction	Nominated
2013	"It's You"	Best Visual Effects	Nominated

=== UK Music Video Awards ===
Year	Nominee / work	Award	Result
2011	"Barbra Streisand"	Best Dance Video - International	Won
2012	"Big Bad Wolf"	Best Dance Video - International	Won
2012	"Big Bad Wolf"	Best Art Direction	Nominated
2012	"Big Bad Wolf"	Best VFX	Nominated

=== Berlin Music Video Awards ===
Year	Nominee / work	Award	Result
2021	Mesmerize	Most Trashy	Won
