= Ride for Me =

Single by A-Trak and Falcons featuring Young Thug and 24hrs
- Released: February 7, 2018
- Genre: Trap
- Length: 4:01
- Label: Fool's Gold Records
- Songwriters: Alain Macklovitch; David Macklovitch; Jeffery Williams; Kevin Vincent; Michael Graham Oatman; Niels Kirk; Robert Davis; Ronald Spencer, Jr.
- Producers: A-Trak; Falcons; Dave 1; Ronny J

"Ride for Me" is a song by Canadian DJ A-Trak and producer Falcons. It features American rappers Young Thug and 24hrs. It was released as a single via A-Trak's Fool's Gold Records on February 7, 2018.

== Background ==
Rolling Stone described Thug's vocals as "eclectic, cartoonish and erratic".
