= Anyway (Duck Sauce song) =

Single by Duck Sauce

from the album Greatest Hits and Quack
- Released: October 25, 2009
- Recorded: 2009
- Genre: Funky house; nu-disco
- Length: 5:02 (Album version); 5:25 (Single version); 2:35 (Radio edit)
- Label: Data; Fool's Gold
- Songwriter(s): Reginald Brown; Jonathan Floyd; Stafford Floyd; Alain Macklovitch; Armand Van Helden
- Producer(s): Duck Sauce

Duck Sauce singles chronology
"Anyway" (2009)	"Barbra Streisand" (2010)

"Anyway" (stylized as "aNYway") is the debut single by American–Canadian DJ duo Duck Sauce. It was released in the United Kingdom on October 25, 2009 by digital download. It peaked at number 22 on the UK Singles Chart, number 1 on the UK Dance Chart and number 1 on the UK Indie Chart. On October 9, 2009, the 1970s style music video was uploaded on YouTube.

"Anyway" largely samples the 1979 song "I Can Do It (Anyway You Want)" by Final Edition.

== Critical reception ==
David Balls of Digital Spy gave the song a positive review stating:

From his 1999 chart-topper 'You Don't Know Me' to his recent collaboration with Dizzee Rascal on 'Bonkers', Armand Van Helden has always been a DJ with crossover appeal. So when he formed Duck Sauce with fellow New Yorker A-Trak - Kanye West's turntablist of choice - the ripples of excitement were quick to make their way across the, ahem, pond.

First offering 'aNYway' finds the pair on a mission to put some "oogie in your boogie" as they dish up a club banger inspired by their hometown. Blending funky '70s disco - courtesy of a sample from Final Edition's 'I Can Do It' - with throbbing house beats, 'aNYway' works a cool retro vibe while still making sense in the present. It's the closest most of us will come to Nights On Broadway this autumn, but it's none too shabby a substitute.

== Track listings ==
Digital download
No.	Title	Length
1.	"Anyway" (Radio Edit)	2:35
2.	"Anyway" (Club Mix)	5:25

== Charts ==
Chart (2009–10)	Peak position
Australia (ARIA)	56
Belgium (Ultratop 50 Flanders)	26
France (SNEP)	38
Netherlands (Single Top 100)	49
UK Dance (OCC)	1
UK Indie (OCC)	1
UK Singles (OCC)	22

== Release history ==
Region	Date	Format	Label
United Kingdom	October 25, 2009	Digital download	Data Records
