= Barbra Streisand (song) =

2010 single by Duck Sauce

Single by Duck Sauce

from the album Quack
- Released: September 10, 2010
- Genre: Nu-disco; house
- Length: 5:00 (original mix); 4:25 (album version); 2:22 (UK radio edit)
- Label: All Around the World; Fool's Gold; Spinnin'
- Songwriters: Frank Farian; Heinz Huth; Jürgen Huth; Fred Jay; Hans Blum; Alain Macklovitch; Armand van Helden
- Producer: Duck Sauce

Duck Sauce singles chronology
"Anyway" (2009)	"Barbra Streisand" (2010)	"Big Bad Wolf" (2011)

Audio sample
- "Barbra Streisand": file; help

Music video
- "Barbra Streisand" on YouTube

Audio
- "Barbra Streisand" (album version) on YouTube
- "Barbra Streisand" (original mix) on YouTube

"Barbra Streisand" is a song by Canadian-American DJ duo Duck Sauce. It was released on September 10, 2010. The song topped the charts in Austria, Belgium, Finland, the Netherlands, Norway, Scotland, and Switzerland and peaked within the top ten of the charts in Australia, Denmark, France, Germany, Israel, Italy, Ireland, Spain, Sweden, and the United Kingdom. On November 30, 2011, the song received a nomination at the 54th Grammy Awards for Best Dance Recording. It is also included in Just Dance 3 for the Wii and Kinect.

== Background and composition ==
The song, named after the American singer and actress Barbra Streisand, relies almost entirely on a sample replay of German disco group Boney M.'s 1979 international hit single "Gotta Go Home", which in turn borrows content from the 1973 German song "Hallo Bimmelbahn" by the band Nighttrain (the brothers Heinz and Jürgen Huth and Michael Holm; the hookline was written only by Heinz Huth). The sample replay of "Gotta Go Home" was produced by Mark Summers at SCORCCiO Replays. The song's lyrics consist entirely of the name "Barbra Streisand" being spoken throughout the piece.

The single's artwork is modeled directly after Streisand's own 1980 album Guilty, which features a photograph of her and Barry Gibb embracing on the sleeve. For the "Barbra Streisand" cover, she and Gibb are instead presented in the form of a black and white line drawing, with duck beaks superimposed over their otherwise blank faces.

== Music video ==
The music video is set in New York City (where Barbra Streisand was born) and it features many prominent and affiliated artists making cameo appearances, such as Kanye West, Pharrell Williams, André 3000, Ryan Leslie, Buckshot, Cocoa Brovaz, DJ Premier, Todd Terry, Chromeo, DJ Mehdi, So Me (who also directed the video), Diplo, Ezra Koenig, Santigold, Yelawolf, Questlove and Fafi and The Fat Jew of Team Facelift. Barbra Streisand herself is not present in the music video, but it features her impersonator, Gayle Robbins.

== Critical reception ==
Nick Levine of Digital Spy gave the song five out of five stars, stating, "... 'Barbra Streisand' actually kinda suits the track, a sassy, no-messin' disco-house dazzler which tips its trilby in the direction of Studio 54 circa 1979 – happily enough, just when Babs was enjoying her own dancefloor dalliance with 'The Main Event' / 'Fight' and 'No More Tears'. Lack of lyrics notwithstanding, it's deliriously catchy, endlessly danceable and ultimately so uplifting that it could even cheer you up after watching the denouement of The Way We Were."

Jason Lipshutz from Billboard gave the song a positive review, describing it as "one of the weirdest, most intoxicating dance anthems in recent memory," and wrote: "The most surprising thing about this collaboration ... is its richness in sound in between the beat-stopping utterances of Streisand's name. Guitar licks collide with heavy doses of synthesizers as a fist-pumping beat refuses to let up. The busy instrumentation is brilliantly paired with overly simple vocals: An upbeat chorus of 'oohs' instantly lodges inside the listener's brain, and 'Barbra Streisand' morphs into an inexplicable command to start dancing." Michael Cragg of The Guardian called the song "an insanely catchy slice of disco house."

== Chart performance ==
The song peaked at number eighty-nine on the Billboard Hot 100 in May 2011, and number one on the Billboard Hot Dance Club Songs chart for the week ending on December 18, 2010.

In the United Kingdom, the song debuted and peaked at number three on the UK Singles Chart on October 17, 2010 ― for the week ending date October 23, 2010 ― selling 67,000 copies in its first week. It also topped the UK Dance Chart.

In the Netherlands, the song debuted at number twenty-five on the Dutch Top 40. It rose up to number two, staying there for several weeks. It broke the record for the most time spent in the second position, without ever reaching the first place.

== Use in other media ==
- The song was featured in the Glee second-season episode titled "Born This Way".
- An official TV spot for the 2012 film The Guilt Trip includes a clip of Streisand and co-star Seth Rogen listening to the song in the car, with Streisand muting it when her name is uttered to instead shout "Me!"
- South Korean Hip-Hop boy band Phantom sampled the song in 2012's "Ice" (하이트광고음악).
- The song was prominently used in Tourism Philippines's 2012 "It's More Fun in the Philippines" publicity campaign.
- The song was used in The Smurfs Dance Party (it was credited as "Barbara Streisand") and later in Just Dance 3.
- The song and music video was used in DanceStar Party for the PlayStation 3 in 2011.
- The song was used in a Mexican Entertainment TV show called "Venga la alegría". The song was modified, replacing the name “Barbra Streisand” with the name of the show's hosts, as the entrance song for a while.

== Track listing ==
- UK CD single
  1. "Barbra Streisand" (UK Radio Edit) – 2:20
  2. "Barbra Streisand" (Extended Mix) – 4:54
  3. "Barbra Streisand" (Afrojack Ducky Mix) – 5:09
  4. "Barbra Streisand" (Afrojack Meaty Mix) – 5:08
- UK digital download
  1. "Barbra Streisand" (UK Radio Edit) – 2:20
  2. "Barbra Streisand" (Original Mix) – 5:00
  3. "Barbra Streisand" (Afrojack Ducky Mix) – 5:09
  4. "Barbra Streisand" (Afrojack Meaty Mix) – 5:08
  5. "You're Nasty" (Vocal Mix) – 5:03
- German CD single
  1. "Barbra Streisand" (Radio Edit) – 3:14
  2. "Barbra Streisand" (Original Mix) – 4:54
- US digital download
  1. "Barbra Streisand" – 5:00
- Australian digital download
  1. "Barbra Streisand" (Radio Edit) – 3:14
  2. "Barbra Streisand" – 5:00
- Dutch digital download
  1. "Barbra Streisand" (Radio Edit) − 2:43
  2. "Barbra Streisand" (UK Radio Edit) − 3:14
  3. "Barbra Streisand" (Original Mix) − 5:00
  4. "Barbra Streisand" (Afrojack Meaty Mix) − 5:07
  5. "Barbra Streisand" (Afrojack Ducky Mix) − 5:08

== Charts ==
=== Weekly charts ===
Chart (2010–2011)	Peak position
Australia (ARIA)	9
Austria (Ö3 Austria Top 40)	1
Belgium (Ultratop 50 Flanders)	1
Belgium (Ultratop 50 Wallonia)	1
Canada Hot 100 (Billboard)	35
CIS Airplay (TopHit)	5
Czech Republic Airplay (ČNS IFPI)	1
Denmark (Tracklisten)	2
Europe (European Hot 100 Singles)	2
Finland (Suomen virallinen lista)	1
France (SNEP)	3
Germany (GfK)	3
Hungary (Dance Top 40)	1
Hungary (Rádiós Top 40)	33
Ireland (IRMA)	2
Israel International Airplay (Media Forest)	3
Italy (FIMI)	4
Luxembourg Digital Songs (Billboard)	1
Netherlands (Dutch Top 40)	2
Netherlands (Single Top 100)	1
New Zealand (Recorded Music NZ)	11
Norway (VG-lista)	1
Poland Airplay (ZPAV)	1
Poland (Dance Top 50)	6
Poland (Video Chart)	3
Romania Airplay (UPFR)	8
Russia Airplay (TopHit)	5
Scottish Singles Sales (Official Charts)	1
Slovakia Airplay (ČNS IFPI)	8
Spain (Promusicae)	6
Sweden (Sverigetopplistan)	8
Switzerland (Schweizer Hitparade)	1
UK Dance (Official Charts)	1
UK Singles (Official Charts)	3
Ukraine Airplay (TopHit)	6
US Billboard Hot 100	89
US Dance Club Songs (Billboard)	1

2025–2026 weekly chart performance for "Barbra Streisand"
Chart (2025–2026)	Peak position
Moldova Airplay (TopHit)	61
Ukraine Airplay (TopHit)	100

=== Year-end charts ===
Chart (2010)	Position
Australia (ARIA)	57
Austria (Ö3 Austria Top 40)	26
Belgium (Ultratop 50 Flanders)	8
Belgium (Ultratop 50 Wallonia)	23
CIS (TopHit)	151
Denmark (Tracklisten)	41
Europe (European Hot 100 Singles)	91
France (SNEP)	59
Germany (Official German Charts)	27
Hungary (Dance Top 40)	43
Italy (FIMI)	91
Netherlands (Dutch Top 40)	40
Netherlands (Single Top 100)	15
Russia Airplay (TopHit)	127
Sweden (Sverigetopplistan)	57
Switzerland (Schweizer Hitparade)	27
UK Singles (OCC)	62

Chart (2011)	Position
Austria (Ö3 Austria Top 40)	32
Belgium (Ultratop 50 Flanders)	90
Belgium (Ultratop 50 Wallonia)	92
CIS (TopHit)	55
France (SNEP)	61
Germany (Official German Charts)	59
Hungary (Dance Top 40)	15
Italy (Musica e dischi)	48
Netherlands (Dutch Top 40)	96
Polish Dance Singles Chart	19
Romania (Romanian Top 100)	63
Russia Airplay (TopHit)	53
Spain (PROMUSICAE)	33
Sweden (Sverigetopplistan)	55
Switzerland (Schweizer Hitparade)	22
Ukraine Airplay (TopHit)	30

== Certifications ==
Region	Certification	Certified units/sales
Australia (ARIA)	2× Platinum	140,000^{^}
Austria (IFPI Austria)	Platinum	30,000^{*}
Belgium (BRMA)	Platinum	30,000^{*}
Canada (Music Canada)	Platinum	80,000^{*}
Denmark (IFPI Danmark)	Platinum	30,000^{^}
Finland (Musiikkituottajat)	Gold	5,878
Germany (BVMI)	Platinum	300,000^{^}
Italy (FIMI)	Platinum	30,000^{*}
New Zealand (RMNZ)	Platinum	15,000^{*}
Spain (Promusicae)	Gold	20,000^{*}
Sweden (GLF)	Platinum	40,000^{‡}
United Kingdom (BPI)	Platinum	600,000^{‡}
United States (RIAA)	Gold	500,000^{‡}
Streaming
Denmark (IFPI Danmark)	Gold	50,000^{†}
^{*} Sales figures based on certification alone.^{^} Shipments figures based on certification alone.^{‡} Sales+streaming figures based on certification alone.^{†} Streaming-only figures based on certification alone.

== Release history ==
Region	Date	Format	Label
Belgium	September 10, 2010	Digital download	ARS
Luxembourg	September 10, 2010	Digital download	ARS
Australia	September 24, 2010	Digital download	etcetc
United Kingdom	October 10, 2010	Digital download	3 Beat; All Around the World
United Kingdom	October 17, 2010	CD single	3 Beat; All Around the World
United States	October 12, 2010	Digital download	Downtown
Denmark	October 22, 2010	Digital download	disco:wax
Germany	October 29, 2010	CD single; digital download	Embassy of Music
Netherlands	November 6, 2010	Digital download	Spinnin'

== See also ==
- "Stars on 45" (song), with a similar vocal part
