= Running Man: Nike+ Original Run =

Mixtape by A-Trak
- Released: June 24, 2008
- Recorded: 2008
- Genre: Hip Hop, Electro
- Length: 43:00
- Label: Nike+ Sport Music (only available at the iTunes Store)
- Producer: A-Trak

Professional ratings
Review scores
Source	Rating
Pitchfork	6.5/10 stars
Allmusic	(reviewed)
Campus Circle	A

Running Man: Nike+ Original Run is the fourth mix in the Nike+ Original Run series. On this album, young DJ and turntablist A-Trak, from Canada (who won DMC World DJ Championship at the age of 15 - the youngest ever winner), now working as a touring DJ for Kanye West, debuted as a producer and composer. The mix was completed as a promotional piece for the Nike + Human Race, a tenth anniversary running event, which took place on 31 August 2008.

The mix includes various hip hop and electro tracks, composed and produced by A-Trak and mixed in one continuous piece. "Making a 45-minute piece was interesting in terms of arrangement," A-Trak said in a short video interview, which is available at the official project's site. "Here, a guy is running and it's all about pacing. You want to keep him in the zone, you want to keep his attention, but at the same time there's much more room to spread out than on a record I might produce for a club." Digital Magazine XLR8R notes, "for a first full-length effort crafted for such a focused audience, A-Trak gets the job done."

Simultaneously with releasing the album at the Nike+ Sportmusic section of the iTunes Store, the promotional website was launched. It contains press-release with detailed information about the project, photos, short video interviews with A-Trak and a free single "Say Whoa" - the first track from the album as a club remix.

== Track listing ==
1. "Running Man" – 43:00
