= Scanners (band) =

English alternative rock band

- Origin: London, England
- Genres: Alternative rock, indie rock
- Years active: 2005–present
- Label: Dim Mak
- Members: Matthew Mole; Sarah Daly; Amina Bates; Ben Grillon; Harry Lane

Scanners are an alternative rock band from London, England formed around 2004.

== History ==
The band was initially formed by Matthew Mole (vocals, guitar, synthesizer) and Sarah Daly (vocals, bass guitar, violin) around 2004, who after writing songs together played their early gigs backed by a drum machine. The line-up was later expanded with the addition of Amina Bates (guitar, keyboards, background vocals), and Tom Hutt (drums). Signed by label owner and DJ Steve Aoki to his indie label Dim Mak. They have supported The Horrors, Devo, The Mystery Jets, The Charlatans, Silversun Pickups, The Wedding Present, Electric Six, Juliette and the Licks, The Presidents of the United States of America (band) and Forward Russia. Their debut album, Violence Is Golden, was released on Dim Mak in 2006, and saw them hailed as "a contender for this summer’s best new act" by Aversion. They have toured the United Kingdom, Europe and North America (including a show as part of the SXSW festival). They have been blogged by Perez Hilton with the title "Perez Pushes The Scanners". and in April 2007 they appeared on Last Call with Carson Daly to perform their single "Lowlife". They also headlined the Les 3 Elefants Festival after Air in France. In October 2007 they recorded a live session for XFM, with another in January 2008. Violence is Golden was released in the UK on 22 February 2008 (on Dim Mak/Influx records) and Dim Mak also released an EP of remixes of "Bombs" with work from A-Trak, LA Riots, The Teenagers and Uffie, and others on 22 January 2008. Their second album Submarine was released in 2010 to a warm critical reception. Scanners third album, Love is Symmetry, was released in 2012 on Dim Mak and Unterschaften records. They toured the States and Europe throughout 2013.

== Use of music in television, film, and video games ==
Their music has been used in US TV shows, motion pictures, and computer games. "Raw" appeared in NBC's Life, episode 218, "Air164" in HBO's Entourage, season 5, episode 7, "Got to Look Up to Get Down" and "In My Dreams" on One Tree Hill season 4 episode 18. "Lowlife" has appeared in motion pictures Mamma's Boy and Endgame which was aired at Sundance Festival 2009 and Human Rights Watch International Film Festival and also shown on UK's Channel 4. A remix of "Bombs" by Le Castle Vania was used for a Brazilian Renault car advert. "Raw" has become a hit with EA Gamers of NHL 08', Also the song was featured in ATV Offroad Fury Pro. "Salvation" was featured in Gossip Girl - "It’s a Dad, Dad, Dad, Dad World" ( Season 3, Episode 20 ). "Baby Blue" is featured in an episode of the U.S. version of Shameless (Season 1 Episode 9 at very end) and so is "Sick Love" (Season 1 Episode 12 when Karen told Lip they should stop seeing each other.) "Jesus Saves" is featured in an episode of the U.S. version of Skins (Season 1 Episode 9).

== Discography ==
=== Singles ===
- "Raw" (2006), Motel
- "Lowlife" (2006), Tigertrap
- "Raw" (2007), (download only)
- Bombs Remixes EP (2008), Dim Mak
- "Lowlife" (2008), Influx/Dim Mak
- "Salvation" (2010), Dim Mak/Unterschaften
- "Baby Blue"/"Salvation" (2011), Puncture/Dim Mak/Unterschaften
- "State of Wonder" (2013), Puncture/Dim Mak/Unterschaften

=== Albums ===
- Violence Is Golden (2006), Dim Mak (US), released in the UK (2008) Dim Mak/Influx
- Submarine (2010), Dim Mak LLC
- Love Is Symmetry (2013), Unter Schafen

== Videos ==
- "Raw"
- "Lowlife"
- "Bombs"
- "Look What You Started"
- "Salvation"
- "Baby Blue"
- "We Never Close Our Eyes"
- "Control"
- "Mexico"
- "State of Wonder"
- "Charmed Life"
