= Mathematics (album) =

Studio album by Melissa Manchester
- Released: April 1985
- Studios: Le Gonks West (West Hollywood, California); Ocean Way Recording and The Sound Factory (Hollywood, California); Schnee Studios and Mama Jo's Recording Studios (North Hollywood, California); The Complex and Lion Share Studios (Los Angeles, California); Ground Control Studios and Starlight Studio (Burbank, California)
- Genres: Pop; synth-pop; dance-pop
- Length: 39:09
- Label: MCA
- Producers: George Duke; Brock Walsh; Robbie Nevil; Robbie Buchanan; Trevor Veitch; John Van Tongeren

Melissa Manchester chronology
Emergency (1983)	Mathematics (1985)	Tribute (1989)

Mathematics (styled Ma+hema+ics) is the twelfth studio album by singer-songwriter Melissa Manchester, issued in April 1985.

== Details ==
The album was Manchester's first studio album since leaving Arista Records, her label for ten years, after her 1983 album Emergency. Signed to MCA Records, the album was a progression of that last album, in that it relied more on a synth-pop/new wave sound rather than on her earlier singer-songwriter-styled records.

Roughly half the songs on the record were produced by George Duke, with the rest produced by Brock Walsh and a then-unknown Robbie Nevil. Robbie Buchanan produced the song "Thunder in the Night" (a song co-written by Martin Page and Diane Warren), and Trevor Veitch produced the song "Energy". Veitch also produced the song "So Full of Yourself", which was only released as the b-side to all three singles off the album. Quincy Jones served as executive producer on four songs on the LP.

The song "Just One Lifetime" was sung by Barbra Streisand to James Brolin during their wedding in 1998, and she recorded it for her 1999 album A Love Like Ours. Streisand liked the chorus of the song but not the verses, so it was asked that original songwriters Tom Snow and Manchester herself wrote new lyrics for the verses before recording it, which they duly did.

The album spawned three singles: the uptempo title track "Mathematics" was the first single and peaked at #74 in the Billboard Hot 100, becoming Manchester's last entry to date on that chart. The next two singles, the Hi-NRG track "Energy" (the only one to have a music video) and the ballad "Just One Lifetime", failed to chart. The album itself had limited success and continued Manchester's chart decline, peaking at a low No. 144 in the USA. To date, it is her last album to chart in that country.

On June 17, 2014 Geffen Records released a digital version of the album through iTunes. The album was released on compact disc on November 2, 2018, by Real Gone Music, as a 2-CD set, with the second Disc containing extended mixes of singles, unreleased songs and other material from her MCA years, such as "The Music of Goodbye", a duet with Al Jarreau.

This would be Manchester's only album with MCA Records. Her only other release with the label was in early 1986, when Manchester recorded the song "The Music of Goodbye", a duet with Al Jarreau, for the soundtrack of the film Out of Africa, which was also released as a single. She left the label not long after.

== Track listing ==
No.	Title	Writer(s)	Producer(s)	Length
1.	"Victims of the Modern Heart"	Roy Freeland; Tom Snow	George Duke	4:16
2.	"Mathematics"	Brock Walsh; Robbie Nevil; Melissa Manchester	Walsh; Robbie Nevil	4:03
3.	"Energy"	Chip Halstead; George Michael Elian; Janis Tunnell	Trevor Veitch	3:41
4.	"Shocked"	Walsh; Nevil	Walsh; Nevil	3:36
5.	"All Tied Up"	Walsh; Nevil	Walsh; Nevil	3:54
6.	"The Dream"	Billy Livsey; Manchester; Walsh	Duke	4:19
7.	"Restless Love"	Manchester; Walsh; Nevil	Walsh; John van Tongeren	3:40
8.	"Thunder in the Night"	Martin Page; Diane Warren	Robbie Buchanan	3:54
9.	"Night Creatures"	Page; Jon Lind	Duke	4:00
10.	"Just One Lifetime"	Manchester; Snow	Duke	4:04
Total length:				39:09

== Personnel ==
Musicians and Vocalists

- Melissa Manchester – lead vocals (1–5, 7–10), all vocals (6), backing vocals (9)
- George Duke – Yamaha DX7 (1, 10), Prophet-5 (1, 6, 10), Memorymoog (1, 6, 9), Synclavier II (6, 9, 10), Yamaha PF15 (6), backing vocals (9), acoustic piano (10)
- Tommy Faragher – synthesizers (2, 5, 7)
- Brock Walsh – synthesizers (2, 4, 7), drums (2, 4, 5, 7), backing vocals (2, 4, 5)
- Larry Williams – synthesizers (2), saxophones (2, 5)
- Richard Gibbs – keyboards (3), synthesizers (3)
- Greg Mathieson – keyboards (3), synthesizers (3)
- Robbie Buchanan – keyboards (8), drum programming (8)
- Paul Jackson Jr. – guitars (1, 6, 9)
- Robbie Nevil – guitar programming (2, 4, 5, 7), drum programming (2, 4, 5, 7), backing vocals (2, 4, 5, 7)
- Michael Landau – guitars (3)
- Lee Ritenour – guitars (3)
- Trevor Veitch – guitars (3)
- Steve Lukather – guitar solo (6)
- Dann Huff – guitars (8)
- Michael Sembello – guitar solo (10)
- Abraham Laboriel – bass guitar (3)
- Freddie Washington – bass guitar (10)
- Carlos Vega – drums (3)
- John Robinson – drums (6, 9, 10)
- Martin Page – drum programming (8)
- Paulinho da Costa – percussion (1, 9)
- Danny Pelfrey – saxophone solo (2)
- Bill Reichenbach Jr. – trombone (2, 5)
- Gary Grant – trumpet (2, 5), flugelhorn (2), piccolo flute (2)
- Jerry Hey – trumpet (2, 5)
- Julia Tillman Waters – backing vocals (2, 5)
- Maxine Waters Willard – backing vocals (2, 5)
- Steve George – backing vocals (3)
- Richard Page – backing vocals (3)
- Andraé Crouch – backing vocals (7)
- Maxi Anderson – backing vocals (7)
- Rose Banks – backing vocals (7)
- Jean Johnson – backing vocals (7)
- Tata Vega – backing vocals (7)
- Tommy Funderburk – backing vocals (8)
- Tom Kelly – backing vocals (8)
- Carl Carwell – backing vocals (9)
- Lynn Davis – backing vocals (9)
- Marcy Levy – backing vocals (9)
- Petsye Powell – backing vocals (9)

Music arrangements

- George Duke – rhythm arrangements (1), arrangements (6, 9, 10)
- Tom Snow – rhythm arrangements (1)
- Melissa Manchester – vocal arrangements (1, 6, 9, 10)
- Jerry Hey – horn arrangements (2, 5)
- Robbie Nevil – arrangements (2, 4, 5, 7)
- Greg Mathieson – arrangements (3)
- John Van Tongeren – synthesizer and string arrangements (7)
- Andraé Crouch – BGV arrangements (7)

Strings on "Just One Lifetime"

- George Del Barrio – string arrangements
- Ronald Cooper, Douglas Davis, Ray Kelly and Earl Madison – cello
- Dorothy Remsen – harp
- Rollice Dale, Roland Kato, Janet Lakatos and Virginia Majewski – viola
- Brenton Banks, Arnold Belnick, Stuart Canin, Bonnie Douglas, Assa Drori, David Frisnia, Ed Green, Reg Hill, Alexander Horvath, Karen Jones, Irma Neumann and Paul Shure – violin

== Production ==
- Quincy Jones – executive producer (2, 4, 5, 7)
- Alice Murrell – production assistant (1, 6, 9, 10)
- Jolie Levine – production coordinator (2, 4, 5, 7)
- Larry Vignon – art direction, design
- Brian Aris – photography
- Michael Lippman – management

Technical

- Tommy Vicari – recording (1, 6, 9, 10), remixing (1, 6, 9, 10)
- Francis Buckley – recording (2, 4, 5, 7), mixing (2, 4, 5, 7)
- Scott Singer – mixing (2, 4, 5, 7), additional engineer (2, 4, 5, 7)
- Don Murray – recording (3)
- David Leonard – mixing (3)
- Jack Joseph Puig – recording (8), mixing (8)
- Paul Ratajzak – additional engineer (2, 4, 5, 7)
- Mitch Gibson – assistant engineer (1, 6, 9, 10)
- Tom Fouce – assistant mix engineer (1, 6, 9, 10)
- Brent Avrill – technical assistant (1, 6, 9, 10)
- Bino Espinoza – assistant engineer (2, 4, 5, 7)
- Paul Erickson – assistant engineer (2, 4, 5, 7)
- Elmer Flores – assistant engineer (2, 4, 5, 7)
- Jim Cassell – recording assistant (8), mix assistant (8)
- Steve Ford – recording assistant (8), mix assistant (8)
- Dan Garcia – recording assistant (8), mix assistant (8)
- Steve MacMillan – recording assistant (8), mix assistant (8)
- Judy Clapp – assistant string engineer (10)

== Charts ==
Chart	Date	Position
US Billboard 200	1985	No. 144
