= Big Bad Wolf (Duck Sauce song) =

Single by Duck Sauce
- Released: September 29, 2011
- Genre: House
- Length: 2:58
- Label: Big Beat; Spinnin'
- Songwriter(s): Alain Macklovitch, Armand van Helden
- Producer(s): Duck Sauce

Duck Sauce singles chronology
"Barbra Streisand" (2010)	"Big Bad Wolf" (2011)	"It's You" (2013)

"Big Bad Wolf" is a song by American–Canadian DJ duo Duck Sauce. It was released on 29 September 2011 by Spinnin' Records. The song peaked at number seventy-nine on the UK Singles Chart.

== Music video ==
Billboard described it as "the most disturbing video of 2011". The magazine also described it as "the most frightening video of 2011". Directed by Keith Schofield, the video features different people with human heads as their genitalia.

== Usage in media ==
In the 2011-12 season after Jason Roberts signed for Reading, the song became his (and the clubs) unofficial anthem. Being played before every home game during April as well as during their lap of honour and in the changing rooms when celebrating promotion.

The song also became the unofficial anthem of the Red Bull Racing Formula One team. During their successful 2011 season, upon winning that weekend's Grand Prix, the team's mechanics would play the song at a very high volume during the packing up. This would often interrupt broadcasters during their post race shows.

In 2016, the song was used in an advertising campaign for Money Supermarket.

== Track listing ==
US Digital download

1. "Big Bad Wolf" (Radio Edit) - 2:58
2. "Big Bad Wolf" (Gesaffelstein Remix) - 5:22

UK Digital download

1. "Big Bad Wolf" (UK Radio Edit) - 2:06
2. "Big Bad Wolf" (Original Mix) - 4:53
3. "Big Bad Wolf" (Gesaffelstein Mix) - 5:22
4. "Big Bad Wolf" (Toddla T Radio Edit) - 3:29
5. "Big Bad Wolf" (Toddla T Mix) - 4:21
6. "Big Bad Wolf" (Dada Life Remix) - 5:14

Dutch digital download

1. "Big Bad Wolf" - 4:53

== Charts ==
Chart performance for "Big Bad Wolf"
Chart (2011)	Peak position
Belgium (Ultratop 50 Flanders)	16
Belgium (Ultratop 50 Wallonia)	44
UK Singles (OCC)	79
UK Dance (OCC)	15

== Release history ==
Region	Date	Format	Label
Netherlands	29 September 2011	Digital download	Spinnin'
United States	18 October 2011	Digital download	Big Beat
United Kingdom	23 October 2011	Digital download	All Around the World Productions
Denmark	16 January 2012	Digital download	disco:wax
