= A-Trak =

Canadian DJ and musician (born 1982)

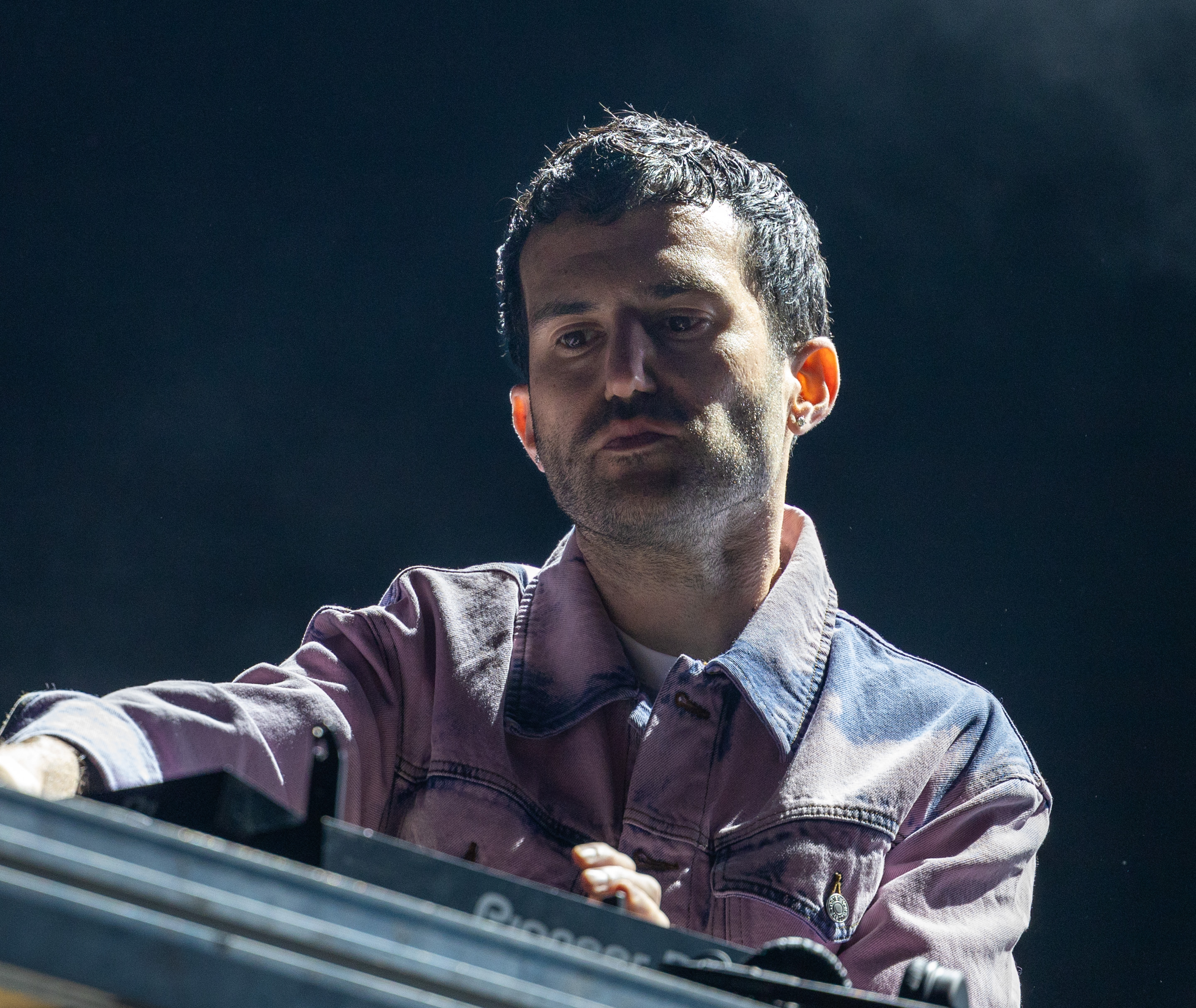
- A-Trak performing in 2024

Background information
- Also known as: A-Trak; DJ A-Trak; Trizzy
- Born: Alain Macklovitch; March 30, 1982 (age 44)
- Origin: Montreal, Quebec, Canada
- Genres: Electro house; hip hop
- Occupations: DJ, record producer, record executive
- Years active: 1997–present
- Labels: Fool's Gold, Audio Research
- Member of: Duck Sauce
- Formerly of: Invisibl Skratch Piklz
- Website: Official website

Alain Macklovitch (born March 30, 1982), known professionally as A-Trak, is a Canadian DJ, record producer, and record executive. He came to prominence in 1997 after winning the World DMC scratching champs at only 15 years old. He started in the 2000s as an international club DJ and remix artist, known for incorporating highly technical turntable skills and scratching into his genre-spanning work. He is also president of the record label Fool's Gold, which was founded in 2007, and is credited for developing the careers of artists such as Kid Cudi, Danny Brown, and Flosstradamus. Among other collaborative projects, he is part of the DJ duo Duck Sauce with Armand Van Helden and was nominated for a Grammy in 2012 for their song "Barbra Streisand".

A-Trak's professional career has spanned over two decades and is built off his early success as a World Champion turntablist as well as Kanye West's original tour DJ. He was named one of the 50 Most Important People in EDM by Rolling Stone and has been called the Global Ambassador of DJ Culture, appearing on the covers of Billboard and Complex magazines.

== Early life ==
Alain Macklovitch was born on March 30, 1982, in Montreal, and was raised in the borough of Outremont. His mother Lison, is a professional translator of Moroccan Jewish descent, while his father Elliot Macklovitch was a professor of linguistics and machine language researcher of Ashkenazi Jewish descent. His older brother, David "Dave 1" Macklovitch, is one-half of the electro-funk duo Chromeo. While his family was 'casually Jewish,' Macklovitch had a bar mitzvah. When he was 18 years old, his mother took him and his brother to Morocco to connect with their roots. In the early 2000s, he studied physics part-time at McGill University.

A-Trak began his interest in music around the age of ten, listening to Beastie Boys, Cypress Hill, and other early 1990s hip hop artists on cassettes his brother would bring home. Wanting to find his own instrument to create music on, he experimented with scratching records on his parents' turntable and quickly became fixated on becoming a good turntablist, finding mentors in local Montreal DJs Kid Koala and DJ Devious.

== Career ==
=== 1997–2002: Champion scratch DJ ===
A-Trak rapidly rose to prominence when he won the DMC World DJ Championship in 1997 at the age of 15, making him the youngest and first Canadian winner of the competition. A-Trak, who had been involved in the Montreal turntable and hip hop scene for a year or so at this point, was hailed by the international community as a highly technical and accomplished turntablist during the height of the scratch DJing in the 1990s. Between 1997 and 2000, he competed as a DJ internationally. A-Trak was the first DJ to win all three major DJ competition titles (DMC, ITF and Vestax), as well as the first DJ to win five World Championships. While he retired from competition in 2000, he continued to showcase his turntable skills in important DJ forums. A-Trak played the first Coachella Music Festival in 1999.

External videos
- A-Trak's DMC World Champion 1997 Winning Set (October 7, 2009)

Also in 1997, A-Trak and his brother Dave, along with creative director Willo Perron, founded the Montreal-based record label Audio Research. Audio Research released a series of turntable and hip hop records and compilations, mostly as 12" records. The label was officially dissolved in 2011. In the late 1990s, A-Trak developed a notation system for scratching. He gave a lecture about it at the Skratchcon 2000 conference and published an article in Tablist Magazine.

==== Obscure Disorder and DJ crews ====
In 1995, A-Trak, with brother Dave 1 and hip hop artists Troy Dunnit, Eclipse, and Logik, formed the hip hop crew Obscure Disorder as an after-school project. The group was part of the Montreal underground hip hop scene in that late 1990s and began releasing their music through Audio Research Records in 1997. The group released a series of singles until they split up in 2002.

A-Trak was an honorary member of the pioneering, and now defunct, DJ crew Invisibl Skratch Piklz. He was also a member of the DJ crew The Allies alongside frequent collaborator DJ Craze, as well as DVLP, Infamous, Spictakular, and J-Smoke; they released an album D-Day in 2000. The crew performed as a competitive turntable team from around 1998 until 2000.

=== 2002–2007: Touring DJ ===
After leaving the competitive DJ scene, A-Trak was interested in DJing for touring artists. A-Trak deejayed at clubs and festivals and released DJ mixes. In the spring of 2006, A-Trak embarked on his first headline tour, titled the Sunglasses Is A Must Tour. It was also around this time that A-Trak began more seriously producing music.

==== Work with Kanye West ====
In 2004, Kanye West recruited A-Trak as his tour DJ. They first met earlier that year when A-Trak was playing a show at a tiny record shop in London where Kanye West came to support John Legend who was also playing in the same show. For the following three years, A-Trak worked closely with West, including at performances alongside the rapper at MTV specials, the Grammy Awards, multiple MTV Video Music Awards, and worldwide stadium shows; this included West's first two headlining tours which ran almost continuously from March 2004 until April 2006. A-Trak also recorded scratches on West's second and third studio albums Late Registration (2005) and Graduation (2007) and was an influence on the overall sound of the latter. A-Trak's most notable Kanye West credit is for the scratches on the 2005 single "Gold Digger." Near the end of 2007, A-Trak split with Kanye West to pursue the founding of his record label.

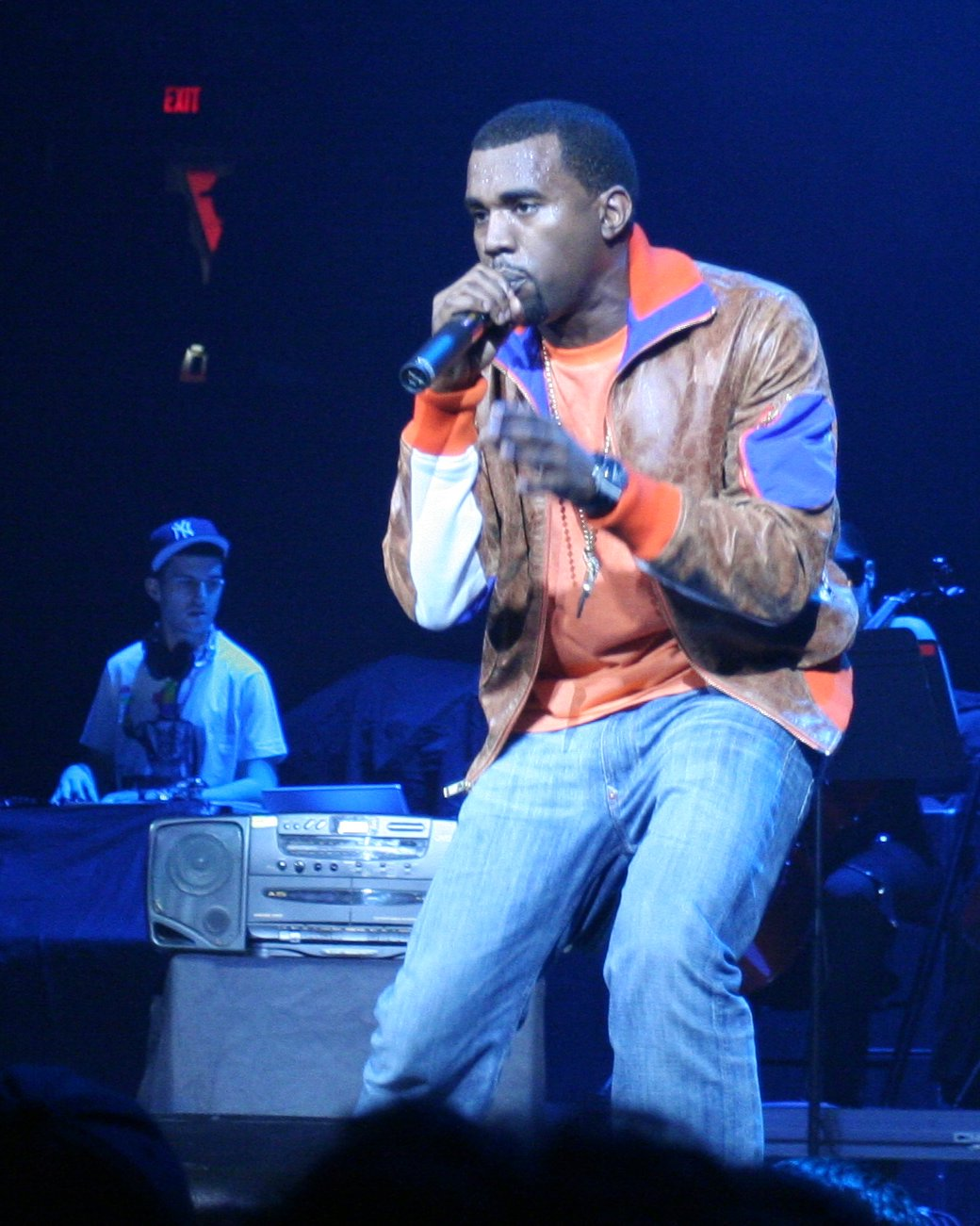
Kanye West performing backed by A-Trak in Portland, Oregon, 2005

=== 2007–2014: Rise to the mainstream ===
After leaving behind his more backstage role as a touring turntablist, A-Trak would become one of the poster boys of the electronic dance music boom of the late 2000s/early 2010s, both due to his original music and highly popular remixes, as well as his curation sense and prowess as a music executive of his label. Since 2010, he has been a fixture on the international EDM music festival circuit and has noted that he is one of the few popular DJs who uses turntables and scratching in his live sets.

In 2012, A-Trak was featured on the cover of Billboard Magazine alongside Diplo and Skrillex; during this period he also appeared on the covers of other magazines including URB (twice), BPM, and Status.

==== Original music and remixes ====
In 2007, A-Trak released popular remixes of Architecture in Helsinki's "Heart It Races," Scanners' "Bombs," and Digitalism's "Idealistic," among others. He sometimes releases his bootlegs and remixes under his alias Trizzy. He also released the original singles "Say Whoa" on the French label Kitsuné. In 2008, A-Trak collaborated with Nike to create the 'soundtrack' Running Man: Nike+ Original Run; as part of his collaboration with Nike he also released the singles "Mastered (Me & My Sneakers)" featuring Lupe Fiasco and "Running Man." That year, he also collaborated with Laidback Luke for the first time, releasing the single "Shake It Down" and co-produced the track" Like The Dancefloor" featuring Natalie Storm with DJ Zinc. One of A-Trak's prominent remixes, a mix of Boys Noize's "Oh!," was also released in 2008.

In 2009, A-Trak released his full-length album DJ mix Infinity + 1. The follow-up record as a solo artists was 2012's Tuna Melt EP, released by Fool's Gold. The video for "Tuna Melt" was nominated in the Best Cinematography category at the MTV Video Music Awards.

Notable releases by A-Trak between these two records include: "Ray Ban Vision" featuring CyHi Da Prince (2010), "Warrior" with Mark Foster and Kimbra for Converse's 3 Artists, 1 Song project (2012), "Money Makin'" with Dillon Francis (2012), and remixes of Daft Punk's "Robot Rock" (2009), Sébastien Tellier's "Kilometer" (2009), Justice's "D.A.N.C.E." (2010), The Rapture's "How Deep Is Your Love" (2011), and Surkin's "Never Let Go" (2012). On June 8, 2010, A-Trak released his remix of the Yeah Yeah Yeahs' track "Heads Will Roll", which was also featured on the Project X soundtrack.

In 2013, collaborated with GTA, Laidback Luke, and Oliver, and released popular remixes of Phoenix's "Trying to Be Cool" and Odd Look by Kavinsky. In February 2013, A-Trak released the video for his "Piss Test" remix off of the Fool's Gold album. The video features appearances by Jim Jones, Juicy J, A$AP Ferg, El-P, Flatbush Zombies, and Flosstradamus and was directed by Shomi Patwary.

In 2008, A-Trak played a series of high-profile music festivals including Coachella and Glastonbury. He had sets at Primavera Sound, Lollapalooza, and Parklife in Australia the following year. He also headlined his 10,000LB Hamburger Tour and a series of Bacardi B-Live sets. In February 2010, it was announced that A-Trak would perform live shows with Travis Barker, who had previously worked with their mutual friend, the late DJ AM. That year, he also played many EDM music festivals including Ultra, Electric Daisy Carnival, and Electric Zoo. The following decade, A-Trak continually at prominent music festivals and clubs. In 2011, he embarked on another headline tour, The Magic 8 Ball Tour and played again at Coachella. In 2012, he deejayed at Ultra and Electric Zoo and at similar festivals the following two year.

==== Fool's Gold founding ====
After moving to Williamsburg, he founded the label Fool's Gold Records with Nick Catchdubs and artist Dust La Rock in 2007. A-Trak and Catchdubs, both DJs, curated a multi-genre roster and have been integral in supporting the rise of many prominent hip hop and electronic artists. A-Trak has said he does not make a salary from the label and instead says its most important function for him is as a creative conduit. Since 2010, A-Trak has been performing at Fool's Gold's Day Off events, which occur about four times a year.

In 2011, A-Trak launched Fool's Gold Radio on the SiriusXM station Electric Area. The show continued for a few years. Also, in 2011, A-Trak opened a shop named Fool's Gold in Williamsburg. The shop closed in early 2017 and reopened on May 20 of the same year at a larger location nearby.

==== Duck Sauce ====
In 2009, A-Trak collaborated with Armand Van Helden to form a disco house production duo under the name Duck Sauce. They released the song "Anyway" in October on Ministry of Sound. Duck Sauce has achieved success worldwide including reaching the top chart position in twelve countries and attaining the number one spot on the US Dance Billboard charts for their song "Barbra Streisand". "Big Bad Wolf" was released by Duck Sauce in 2011 on BBC Radio and samples wolves howling.

Following the announcement of a debut album, Duck Sauce released the singles "It's You" and "Radio Stereo". They released their first album, 'Quack', in 2014. Duck Sauce has been on the cover of DJ Mag twice, most recently in March 2020. In 2020, they also returned with two new singles, the first since 2014, "Smiley Face" and "Captain Duck".

=== 2014–present: New collaborations and ventures ===
Since the EDM explosion brought A-Trak to the forefront of electronic music in the 2010s, he has continued to evolve and innovate as both a producer and music executive, securing his position "of elder statesman of the culture." From the early 2010s to presently, A-Trak has been a fixture on the international electronic music festival scene. In August 2019, A-Trak joined the board of managers at Beatsource as an advisor. The company is the largest record promotion pool in the U.S. and serves the open-format DJ community with curated music from worldwide labels. He is also an investor and minority partner in Montreal-based imprint SAINTWOODS, which operates venues, a marketing agency and a clothing line.

==== New collaborations ====
Coming off a series of releases with Duck Sauce, A-Trak continued to collaborate with other artists, especially artists on Fool's Gold. In January 2014, A-Trak teamed up with Cadillac in a campaign to introduce their new logo and the 2015 ATS Coup. On November 25, 2014, A-Trak released his Push EP, featuring his single "Push", (featuring Andrew Wyatt). The song was included in FIFA 15 and received a companion remix album featuring remixes from The Chainsmokers, Cazzette, René LaVice, DallasK, among others, in 2015.

A-Trak received much publicity and released a string of singles in 2015. These included his remix of Alesso's song "Cool" and his single "We All Fall Down" (featuring Jamie Lidell), as well as remixes by Volt & State, CID and Jarreau Vandal. A-Trak was featured on Zhu's 2015 EP Genesis Series for his track "As Crazy as It Is" and was also featured on Disclosure's Magnets [The Remixes] EP, for his remix of "Magnets" (featuring Lorde). At the end of the year, A-Trak's "Place on Earth" single with ZooFunktion was released on Spinnin' Records.

A-Trak was featured on the 2016 Fool's Gold Records compilation album Fool's Gold Presents: Night Shift, for his song "Only One" with Ookay. On May 3, 2016, A-Trak premiered his single "Parallel Lines" (featuring Phantogram) on Zane Lowe's Beats 1 Radio show. A-Trak embarked on an Australian Tour with fellow producer What So Not on June 30, 2016. With Kanye West and Lex Luger, he also co-produced the song "Champions".

In 2017, A-Trak released "Believe" featuring Quavo and Lil Yachty, collaborated with Baauer for two singles, "Fern Gully" and "Dumbo Drop," and produced the song "Kitana" for Princess Nokia. He was also featured on tracks by Calvin Harris and The Cool Kids. In 2018, the single "Ride for Me" was released as a collaboration by A-Trak, Falcons, Young Thug and 24hrs via A-Trak's record label Fool's Gold.

In 2019, A-Trak released two singles, the disco-house track "Work It Out" in April and the Loods collaboration "What Can I Do" later that year, as well as a handful of VIP reworks on his recent A-Trak Bootleg Series, an informal collection of free releases he's made for his DJ sets. It was rumored that the producer was to release larger collection of music later in 2019 or in 2020.

In 2020, he began formally collaborating with his brother Dave 1 under the moniker The Brothers Macklovitch. They released two original singles that year, "Give Love to Get Some" and "I Can Call You."

==== Expansion of Fool's Gold ====
A-Trak's label began growing and his duties for it with it. Additionally, he began his own weekly two-hour radio show on Beats 1, listened to via Apple Music Connect, named Day Off Radio on July 4, 2015.

==== Goldie Awards ====
A-Trak helped to found a new DJ award in 2017 called the Goldie Awards. His hope is to create a new forum for DJ battles and contemporary scratch DJing. The annual awards competition takes place in New York every year and A-Trak is an integral part of the affair.

== Sound and equipment ==
Over the years, A-Trak has endorsed several brands including Serato Scratch Live and Rane DJ equipment. He was the first artist to ever endorse Serato and influenced many other DJs to use the software.

He is known for merging the sounds of rap and electronic music through his remix work, his 2007 CD Dirty South Dance, his production for Kid Sister and Lupe Fiasco, and his remixes for electronic artists including MSTRKRFT and Boys Noize. However, some of his production displays a separation of his electronic and hip hop identities, with releases such as "Piss Test" featuring Juicy J and collaborations with Tommy Trash on "Tuna Melt". Another hip hop production, "Ray Ban Vision", was used in the 2012 movie Project X.

== Personal life ==
After residing in Brooklyn for many years, Macklovitch moved to Los Angeles in late 2014, and relocated back to New York City after the pandemic.

== Awards ==
A-Trak was the 1999 YTV Achievement Awards Special Performance winner. In 2011, he was nominated for a Grammy Award alongside co-producer Armand Van Helden for their production and mixing of the track "Barbra Streisand". In 2012, Duck Sauce's "Big Bad Wolf" was nominated for a VMA for Best Electronic Dance video. In 2013, A-Trak's video for "Tuna Melt" was nominated in the Best Cinematography category at the MTV Video Music Awards. In 2017, A-Trak was nominated for DJ of the Year at the Electronic Music Awards. In 2018, he won Regional Open Format Club DJ of The Year (Northeast) at the Global Spin Awards.

=== The Grammy Awards ===
Year	Nominated work	Award	Result	Ref.
2012	"Barbra Streisand" (with Duck Sauce)	Grammy Award for Best Dance Recording	Nominated	

=== DJ Magazine Top 100 DJs ===
Year	Peak position	Notes	Ref.
2017	124	Out	
2018	136	Out (Down 12)	

=== DJ Competitions ===
- 1997 : Technics / DMC World Champion (15 years old – youngest ever)
- 1998 : Technics / DMC World 2nd Runner Up
- 1999 : ITF World Champion (Advancement category)
- 1999 : ITF Western Hemisphere Scratching Champion
- 1999 : Vestax World DJ Extravaganza Champion
- 2000 : ITF World Champion (Advancement category)
- 2000 : DMC Team Champion (with DJ Craze)

== See also ==
- Disco Mix Club
- List of Quebec musicians
- Duck Sauce
- Fool's Gold Records
