= Fool's Gold Records =

American independent record label

- Founded: 2007
- Founder: Alain Macklovitch; Nick Barat
- Distributor: Virgin Music Group
- Genre: Electronic, hip hop
- Country of origin: United States
- Location: Brooklyn, New York
- Official website: foolsgoldrecs.com

Fool's Gold Records is an independent record label based in Brooklyn, New York, United States. The label is known for its annual series of Day Off concerts across the US and Canada.

== History ==
Fool’s Gold Records was founded in 2007 by DJs A-Trak and Nick Catchdubs. It established itself with releases bridging the worlds of all music genres together to the world while being dubbed an "indie innovator" by Billboard and a "tastemaker" label by The New York Times, and "one of the most influential indies in the music business" by Pitchfork. It moved to Universal Music Group & Virgin Music for new distribution.

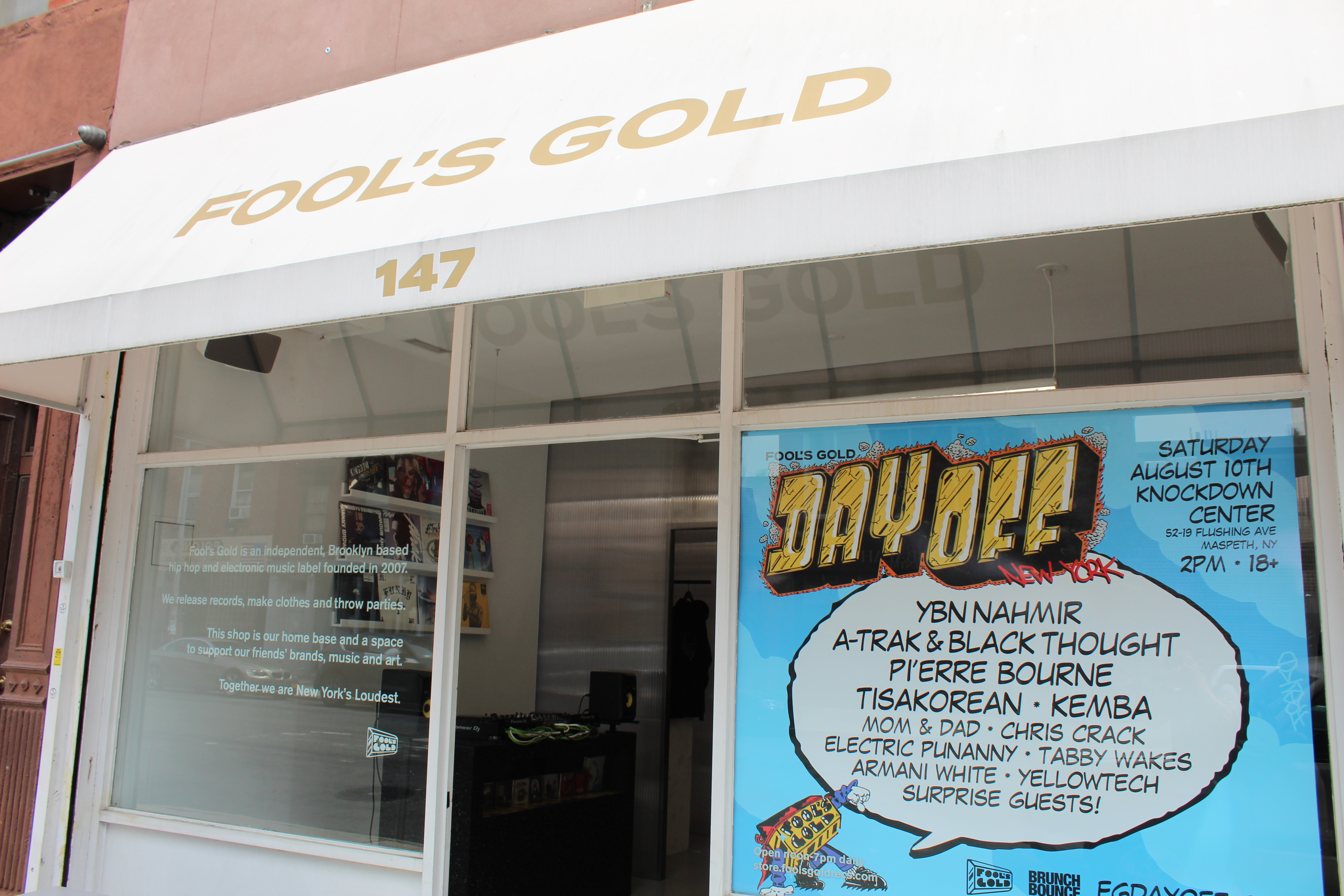
Front Of Fools Gold Space

== Roster ==
Roster
- 100s
- A-Trak
- Alexander Robotnick
- Alvin Risk
- Anna Lunoe
- Ape Drums
- Bag Raiders
- Cardo
- Brockhampton
- Carnage
- Chromeo
- Chris Crack
- Congorock
- The Count & Sinden
- Crookers
- Cubic Zirconia
- D.O.D
- Danny Brown
- Donnis
- Duck Sauce
- Flosstradamus
- Giraffage
- Jokers of the Scene
- Just Blaze
- Kavinsky
- Kid Cudi
- Kid Sister
- Laidback Luke
- Lil B
- McLane
- Meyhem Lauren
- NAPT
- Nick Catchdubs
- Oliver
- Onra
- Party Supplies
- Ricky Blaze
- RL Grime
- Rome Fortune
- Run the Jewels
- Sleepy Tom
- Style of Eye
- Sweet Valley
- Ta-ku
- Tchami
- The Cool Kids
- The Suzan
- Tommy Trash
- Trackademicks
- Treasure Fingers
- World's Fair

== 2016 Concert Series ==
The New York Edition of the 2016 Concert Series features included Migos, A-Trak, Lil Yachty, Dave East, Juelz Santana, Leaf and Nick Catchdubs. The New York event commenced on August 20, then Miami on September 17, and LA on September 25.
