= Armand van Helden discography =

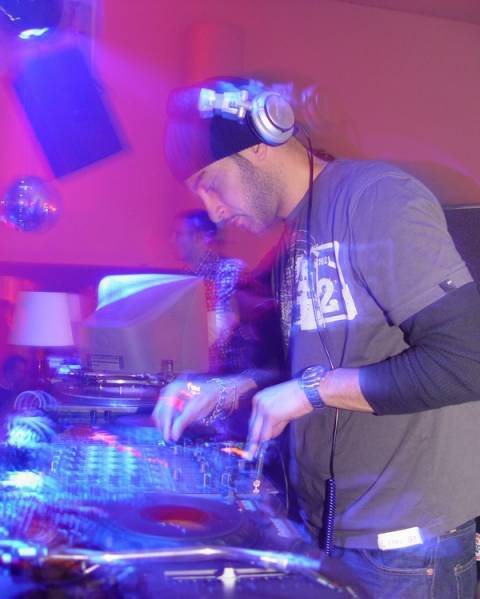
- Studio albums: 9
- Extended plays: 16
- Compilation albums: 11
- Singles: 62
- Music videos: 19

American music producer and DJ Armand van Helden has released seven studio albums, ten compilation albums, two remix albums, eight DJ mix albums, sixteen extended plays (EPs) and sixty singles.

== Albums ==
=== Studio albums ===
List of studio albums, with selected chart positions and certifications
Title	Album details	Peak chart positions						Certifications
Title	Album details	AUS	BEL	FRA	NOR	NZ	UK	Certifications
Old School Junkies: The Album	Released: October 8, 1996; Label: Henry Street; Formats: CD, LP, cassette, digital download	—	—	—	—	—	—	
Sampleslaya: Enter the Meatmarket	Released: November 10, 1997; Label: Ruffhouse; Formats: CD, LP, cassette, digital download	—	—	—	—	—	—	
2 Future 4 U	Released: November 30, 1998; Label: Armed; Formats: CD, LP, cassette, digital download	73	39	30	36	50	22	BPI: Silver
Killing Puritans	Released: June 6, 2000; Label: Armed; Formats: CD, LP, cassette, digital download	170	49	—	—	—	38	
Gandhi Khan	Released: October 2, 2001; Label: Armed; Formats: CD, LP, cassette, digital download	—	—	—	—	—	—	
Nympho	Released: July 4, 2005; Label: Southern Fried; Formats: CD, LP, digital download	88	46	—	—	—	—	
Ghettoblaster	Released: April 24, 2007; Label: Southern Fried; Formats: CD, digital download	—	97	—	—	—	—	
Extra Dimensional	Released: November 25, 2016; Labels: Spinnin'; Formats: CD, digital download	—	—	—	—	—	—	
"—" denotes a recording that did not chart or was not released in that territory.

=== Compilation albums ===
- Best of Armand Van Helden (1994)
- Da Club Phenomena (1997)
- The Collection (1997)
- Greatest Hits (1997)
- The Funk Phenomena (1997)
- The Armand Van Helden Phenomena (1999)
- Funk Phenomena The Album (2002)
- The Funk Phenomena & Old School Junkies: The Complete Sessions (2003)
- Armand (2005)
- You Don't Know Me: The Best of Armand Van Helden (2008) #41 (UK)
- Masterpiece (2015)
- House Masters (2016)

=== Remix albums ===
- Nympho: The Remixes (2006)
- Ghettoblaster Remixes (2009)

=== DJ mix albums ===
- Get Up (1994)
- Live from Your Mutha's House (1994)
- Armand Van Helden's Nervous Tracks (1999)
- Repro (2001)
- New York: A Mix Odyssey (2004) #109 AUS
- New York Loft Party (2004)
- New York: A Mix Odyssey 2 (2008)
- Armand Van Helden & A-Trak Present Duck Sauce (2009)

=== Extended plays ===
- Pirates of the Caribbean (1992)
- The Funky Shell Toes (1992)
- Pirates of the Caribbean Vol. II (1993)
- Pirates of the Caribbean Vol. III (1994)
- The Buddha Baboons (1994)
- Armand Van Helden EP (1994)
- Old School Junkies (1995)
- Old School Junkies Pt. 2 (1996)
- Hardsteppin Disko Selection (1996) (with DJ Sneak)
- 2 Future 4 U EP (1998) #92 (UK)
- Redneck Revenge (2001) (as Klobber)
- Phunhouse EP (2001) (as Klobber)
- Stupid Fresh #1 (2002)
- Stupid Fresh #2 (2002)
- Stupid Fresh #3 (2002)
- Greatest Hits (2009) (as Duck Sauce)

== Singles ==
=== List of singles ===
As main artist

- 1994: "Witch Doktor"
- 1996: "Ain't Armand"
- 1996: "Cha Cha"
- 1996: "The Funk Phenomena"
- 1997: "Ultrafunkula"
- 1998: "Pushem' Up"
- 1999: "You Don't Know Me" (featuring Duane Harden)
- 1999: "Flowerz" (featuring Roland Clark)
- 1999: "Entra Mi Casa" (featuring Mita)
- 1999: "Necessary Evil"
- 1999: "Mother Earth"
- 1999: "The Boogie Monster"
- 2000: "Koochy"
- 2000: "Full Moon" (featuring Common)
- 2000: "Fly Away Love"/"Little Black Spiders"
- 2001: "Why Can't You Free Some Time"
- 2002: "Kentucky Fried Flow"
- 2002: "Gandhi Kahn"
- 2002: "Sell deh Pussy"
- 2003: "I Can Smell You"
- 2003: "Let Me Lead You"
- 2003: "Wasn't the Only"
- 2004: "Hear My Name" (featuring Spalding Rockwell)
- 2004: "My My My"
- 2005: "Into Your Eyes"
- 2005: "When the Lights Go Down"
- 2006: "Sugar"
- 2006: "My My My" (featuring Tara McDonald)
- 2007: "Touch Your Toes" (featuring Fat Joe and BL)
- 2007: "NYC Beat"
- 2007: "I Want Your Soul"
- 2008: "Je t'aime" (featuring Nicole Roux)
- 2008: "Shake That Ass" (featuring Team Facelift)/"Ski Hard" (featuring Christian Rich)
- 2009: "Illin' n Fillin' It" (featuring Netic)
- 2009: "Bonkers" (with Dizzee Rascal)
- 2010: "Brrrat!" (with Steve Aoki)
- 2013: "I Know a Place" (with Spank Rock)
- 2014: "Power of Bass" (with Hervé)
- 2016: "Wings"
- 2016: "Know Thyself"
- 2017: "I Need a Painkiller" (with Butter Rush), BPI: Silver
- 2020: "Give Me Your Loving" (with Lorne)
- 2020: "Power of Bass" (with Solardo and Herve)
- 2020: "The Answer" (with Chris Lake featuring Arthur Baker and Victor Simonelli)
- 2021: "Thunder In My Heart Again" (with Meck featuring Leo Sayer)
- 2022: "My Life" (with Wh0 feat. Joe Killington)

Other aliases

- 1992: "Stay on My Mind"/"The Anthem" (as Deep Creed)
- 1993: "Move It to the Left"/"Dance Together" (as Sultans of Swing)
- 1993: "Love Thang" (as Banji Boys)
- 1993: "Indonesia"/"Mamba Mama" (as Circle Children)
- 1994: "Zulu" (as Circle Children)
- 1994: "Can You Feel It"/"Warrior's Dance" (as Deep Creed)
- 1994: "Loves Ecstasy"/"Egyptian Magician" (as Jungle Juice)
- 1994: "Gonna Set Ya Free"/"Fantasy" (as Wizzard of Wax)
- 1994: "Watch It Now Star (*)" (as Armand and the Banana Spliffs)
- 1994: "New York Express" (as Hardhead)
- 1995: "Demon Dreams" (as Hardhead)
- 1995: "The Only One" (as Cappuccino)
- 1996: "Break Night"/"Ocean" (as The Mole People)
- 1996: "Aw Yeah" (as Chupacabra)
- 1996: "From da East" (as Subspecies)
- 1996: "Spark da Meth" (as Da Mongoloids)
- 1996: "Psychic Bounty Killaz" (with DJ Sneak)
- 1998: "Ghetto House Groove" (with The Horse)
- 2001: "You Can't Change Me" (with Roger Sanchez and N'Dea Davenport)
- 2001: "Grand Rapids" (as Klobber)
- 2002: "1985"/"Dance of a Lifetime" (as Stupid Fresh)
- 2003: "Everytime I Feel It" (as Sahara)
- 2009: "aNYway"/"You're Nasty" (as Duck Sauce)
- 2010: "Barbra Streisand" (as Duck Sauce)
- 2010: "Brrrat!" (with Steve Aoki)
- 2011: "Big Bad Wolf" (as Duck Sauce)
- 2013: "I Know A Place" (featuring Spank Rock)
- 2013: "It's You" (as Duck Sauce)
- 2013: "Radio Stereo" (as Duck Sauce)
- 2014: "NRG" (as Duck Sauce)

=== Charted singles ===
==== As lead artist ====
Year	Title	Peak chart positions										Certifications	Album
Year	Title	US Dance	AUS	BEL	FIN	GER	IRE	NED	NZ	SWE	UK	Certifications	Album
1994	"Witch Doktor"	3	—	48	—	—	—	46	—	—	79		Armand Van Helden EP
1996	"Cha Cha"	10	—	—	—	—	—	—	—	—	180		Non-album single
1996	"The Funk Phenomena"	—	—	37	—	51	—	67	—	—	38		Old School Junkies: The Album
1997	"Ultrafunkula"	—	178	—	—	—	—	—	—	—	46		Sampleslaya: Enter the Meatmarket
1999	"You Don't Know Me" (featuring Duane Harden)	2	15	13	—	40	11	14	15	27	1	ARIA: Gold; BPI: Platinum; RMNZ: Gold	2 Future 4 U
1999	"Flowerz" (featuring Roland Clark)	—	—	57	—	—	—	—	24	—	18		2 Future 4 U
2000	"Koochy"	—	71	38	—	—	29	—	—	—	4		Killing Puritans
2000	"Full Moon" (featuring Common)	—	154	—	—	—	—	—	—	—	133		Killing Puritans
2001	"Why Can't You Free Some Time"	—	197	—	—	—	—	—	—	—	34		Gandhi Khan
2004	"Hear My Name" (featuring Spalding Rockwell)	7	32	44	—	84	—	—	—	—	34		Nympho
2004	"My My My"	2	6	5	—	—	36	18	—	—	15	ARIA: Gold; BPI: Platinum; RMNZ: Platinum	Nympho
2005	"Into Your Eyes"	—	28	31	20	—	—	53	—	—	48		Nympho
2005	"When the Lights Go Down"	—	52	60	8	—	—	89	—	—	70		Nympho
2006	"Sugar"	—	144	—	5	—	—	—	—	—	103		Nympho
2006	"My My My" (featuring Tara McDonald)	—	—	—	—	—	25	—	—	—	12		Nympho: The Remixes
2007	"Touch Your Toes" (featuring Fat Joe and BL)	—	93	—	6	—	—	—	—	38	145		Ghettoblaster
2007	"NYC Beat"	—	36	—	—	—	—	—	—	—	22		Ghettoblaster
2007	"I Want Your Soul"	—	85	64	10	—	100	—	—	13	19		Ghettoblaster
2008	"Je t'aime" (featuring Nicole Roux)	—	127	70	—	—	—	—	—	—	163		Ghettoblaster
"—" denotes releases that did not chart.

==== As featured artist ====
Year	Title	Peak chart positions								Album	Certifications
Year	Title	AUS	BEL	EU Hot 100	IRE	NED	NZ	SWI	UK	Album	Certifications
2001	"You Can't Change Me" (with Roger Sanchez and N'Dea Davenport)	45	53	—	—	78	—	86	25		First Contact
2009	"Bonkers" (with Dizzee Rascal)	13	6	6	3	63	12	88	1	ARIA: 3× Platinum; RMNZ: 3× Platinum	Tongue n' Cheek
"—" denotes releases that did not chart.

== Music videos ==
Year	Title	Director(s)
1995	"Witch Doktor"	Margaret Malandruccolo
1996	"The Funk Phenomena"	
1999	"You Don't Know Me"	
2000	"Koochy"	Sam Brown
2000	"Full Moon"	
2001	"Why Can't You Free Some Time"	Howard Shur
2001	"You Can't Change Me"	Philippe Andre
2004	"Hear My Name"	Alex & Liane
2004	"My My My"	
2005	"Into Your Eyes"	Waverly
2005	"When the Lights Go Down"	Waverly
2007	"Touch Your Toes"	
2007	"NYC Beat"	
2007	"I Want Your Soul"	Va$htie
2008	"Shake That Ass"	McRich
2008	"Ski Hard"	Dave Aspinall
2009	"Bonkers"	Popcore
2010	"Brrrat!"	Ace Norton

== Remixes ==
=== 1990s ===
- 1990: Mike "Hitman" Wilson featuring Shawn Christopher – "Another Sleepless Night"
- 1990: Aftershock – "She Loves Me, She Loves Me Not"
- 1991: C+C Music Factory – "Here We Go (Let's Rock & Roll)"
- 1991: Device – "What Is Sadness"
- 1991: Tracie Spencer – "This House"
- 1991: Midnight Star – "Freak-A-Zoid"
- 1991: Guy – "Do Me Right"
- 1991: Deee-Lite – "Good Beat"
- 1991: B Angie B – "I Don't Wanna Lose Your Love"
- 1991: Enigma – "Mea Culpa"
- 1991: Jazzy Jeff and the Fresh Prince – "Summertime"
- 1991: B.G., the Prince of Rap – "This Beat is Hot"
- 1991: Grooveline – "Heatwave"
- 1991: Crystal Waters – "Makin' Happy"
- 1991: Cola Boy – "7 Ways to Love"
- 1991: Vanessa L. Williams – "Running Back to You"
- 1991: C+C Music Factory – "Just a Touch of Love"
- 1991: PM Dawn – "Set Adrift on Memory Bliss"
- 1991: Bell Biv Devoe – "Word to the Mutha!"
- 1991: Ce Ce Peniston – "Finally"
- 1991: Chic – "Le Freak"
- 1992: Lil' Louis – "Club Lonely"
- 1992: Ce Ce Peniston – "Keep On Walkin'"
- 1992: Tito Puente – "Para Los Rumberos"
- 1992: Snap! – "Rhythm Is a Dancer"
- 1992: Lidell Townsell and M.T.F. – "Get With U"
- 1992: Pamela Fernandez – "Kickin in the Beat"
- 1992: Das EFX – "Mic Checka"
- 1992: Shabba Ranks – "Mr. Loverman"
- 1992: Bizarre Inc – "I'm Gonna Get You"
- 1993: B-Tribe – "Nadie Entiende (Nobody Understands)"
- 1993: Urban Cookie Collective – "The Key The Secret"
- 1993: Bizarre Inc – "Took My Love"
- 1993: Captain Hollywood Project – "More and More"
- 1993: Onyx – "Slam"
- 1994: Barbara Tucker – "I Get Lifted"
- 1994: Cappella – "Move on Baby"
- 1994: Sagat – "Luvstuff"
- 1994: Reality – "Wanna Get Busy"
- 1994: Fresh Tunes – "Do You Know What I Mean?"
- 1994: Rednex – "Cotton Eye Joe"
- 1994: Deep Creed – "Warrior's Dance"
- 1994: Geoffrey Williams – "Sex Life"
- 1994: Reel 2 Real – "Raise Your Hands"
- 1994: Kim English – "Nite Life"
- 1994: Ace of Base – "Living in Danger"
- 1994: Veda Simpson – "Oohhh Baby"
- 1994: Kathy Brown – "Turn Me Out"
- 1994: M.C. Sar & the Real McCoy – "Another Night"
- 1995: New Order – "Bizarre Love Triangle"
- 1995: 4th Measure Men – "The Keep"
- 1995: Barbara Tucker – "Stay Together"
- 1995: Bananarama – "Every Shade of Blue"
- 1995: Blondie – "Atomic"
- 1995: Chazz – "A Mover La Colita"
- 1995: M People – "Open Your Heart"
- 1995: Doubleplusgood – "The Winding Song"
- 1995: 2 in a Room – "Carnival"
- 1995: The Moonwalkers featuring Ultra Naté – "10,000 Screamin' Faggots (A Poem)"
- 1995: 2 in a Room – "Giddy-Up"
- 1995: M.C. Sar & the Real McCoy – "Run Away"
- 1995: Kenny "Dope" Gonzalez presents The Bucketheads – "The Bomb! (These Sounds Fall Into My Mind)"
- 1995: Sunscreem – "When"
- 1995: Sara Parker – "My Love Is Deep"
- 1995: Ace of Base – "Lucky Love"
- 1995: Yaki-Da – "I Saw You Dancing"
- 1995: Ghost Town DJ's – "My Boo"
- 1995: M.C. Sar & the Real McCoy – "Automatic Lover (Call for Love)"
- 1995: Jimmy Somerville – "Heartbeat"
- 1995: Deep Forest – "Marta's Song"
- 1995: Reel 2 Real featuring The Mad Stuntman – "Conway"
- 1995: Vanessa L. Williams – "The Way That You Love"
- 1995: 3*D – "Georgy Porgy"
- 1995: Vida Simpson – "Oohhh Baby"
- 1995: Sagat – "Get Outta My Face"
- 1995: Skeeta Ranx – "I Like"
- 1996: Tori Amos – "Professional Widow"
- 1996: Daft Punk – "Da Funk"
- 1996: Trancesetters – "The Search"
- 1996: Apollo 440 – "Ain't Talkin' 'bout Dub"
- 1996: 2 Unlimited – "Jump for Joy"
- 1996: CJ Bolland – "Sugar Is Sweeter"
- 1996: Reign – "Indestructible"
- 1996: Real McCoy – "Ooh Boy"
- 1996: 2 in a Room – "Carnival"
- 1996: Johnny 'D' and Nicky P. – "Magic"
- 1996: Sneaker Pimps – "Spin Spin Sugar"
- 1996: F.Y.C. – "The Flame"
- 1996: Nuyorican Soul featuring India – "Runaway"
- 1996: Ce Ce Peniston – "We Got a Love Thang"
- 1996: 2 Unlimited – "Twilight Zone"
- 1996: Doubleplusgood – "The Winding Song"
- 1996: Hard House Café – "Hurt Me...Hard!"
- 1997: The Rolling Stones – "Anybody Seen My Baby?"
- 1997: Faithless – "Insomnia"
- 1997: Janet Jackson featuring Q-Tip And Joni Mitchell – "Got 'til It's Gone"
- 1997: Goldie featuring KRS-One – "Digital"
- 1997: Aaliyah – "One in a Million"
- 1997: Gat Decor – "In the Head"
- 1997: Sash! featuring La Trec – "Stay"
- 1997: Genaside II – "Narra Mine"
- 1997: Puff Daddy and The Family – "It's All About the Benjamins"
- 1997: Nuyorican Soul – "It's Alright, I Feel It!"
- 1997: Jarvic 7 – "Reach Out!"
- 1998: Locust – "No One in the World"
- 1998: Wamdue Project – "Where Do We Go"
- 1999: War – "Slippin' into Darkness"
- 1999: Skunk Anansie – "Secretly"

=== 2000s ===
- 2002: Kelli Ali – "Kids"
- 2002: Modjo – "On Fire"
- 2003: Nelly Furtado – "Força"
- 2003: Lacquer – "Behind"
- 2003: Space Cowboy – "Crazy Talk"
- 2003: Ashanti – "Rock wit U (Awww Baby)"
- 2003: Blue Man Group featuring Gavin Rossdale – "The Current"
- 2004: Felix da Housecat – "Watching Cars Go By"
- 2004: Enrique Iglesias – "Not In Love"
- 2004: Britney Spears – "My Prerogative"
- 2004: Britney Spears – "Toxic"
- 2004: Javine – "Don't Walk Away"
- 2004: Cerrone – "Je Suis Music"
- 2004: Gwen Stefani – "What You Waiting For?"
- 2004: Sugababes – "Hole in the Head"
- 2004: DJ Sneak – "Funky Rhythm"
- 2004: Jason Downs – "Dirty Mind"
- 2004: Basement Jaxx featuring JC Chasez – "Plug It In"
- 2004: Despina Vandi – "Opa Opa"
- 2004: Aloud – "Bob O'Lean"
- 2006: The Boy Least Likely To – "Monsters"
- 2006: Justin Timberlake – "SexyBack"
- 2006: Tarkan – "Bounce"
- 2006: Moby feat. Debbie Harry – "New York, New York"
- 2007: Simian Mobile Disco – "Hustler"
- 2007: Felix Da Housecat – "Like Something 4 Porno!"
- 2007: Therese – "Feelin' Me"
- 2007: Wu Tang Clan – "C.R.E.A.M."
- 2008: Shinichi Osawa – "Star Guitar"
- 2008: Hervé – "Cheap Thrills"
- 2008: Lisa Miskovsky – "Still Alive"
- 2008: Retro Kidz - "New Era"
- 2008: Ayumi Hamasaki – "Inspire"
- 2009: Ou Est le Swimming Pool – "Dance The Way I Feel"
- 2009: MPHO – "Box N Locks"
- 2009: Bloc Party – "Signs"
- 2009: Jack Peñate – "Be the One"

=== 2010s ===
- 2010: David Guetta featuring Kid Cudi – "Memories"
- 2010: Uffie featuring Pharrell Williams – "ADD SUV"
- 2010: Katy Perry – "California Gurls"
- 2011: Bag Raiders – "Sunlight"
- 2014: Sam Smith – "I'm Not the Only One"
- 2014: Jungle 70 and Majestic – "Creeping In The Dark"
- 2015: Twin Shadow – "Old Love / New Love"
- 2015: Snakehips – Forever
- 2015: Petite Meller – Baby Love
- 2015: Madonna – "Ghosttown"
- 2015: Disclosure – Holding On
- 2015: Jack Ü – Skrillex and Diplo – To Ü
- 2016: Jodie Abacus – "Hot Kitchen"
- 2017: High Contrast featuring Boy Matthews – "Questions"
- 2017: Le Youth – "Clap Your Hands"
- 2018: Galantis featuring Max – "Satisfied" (Armand Van Helden and Cruise Control Remix)

=== 2020s ===
- 2020: Jonas Blue and Max – "Naked"
- 2021: Silk City and Ellie Goulding - "New Love"
- 2022: LF System – "Afraid to Feel"

== Productions ==
- Tonja Dantzler – "In and Out of My Life" (1994)
- Reel 2 Real – Are You Ready for Some More? (1996) ("Do Not Panic")
- DJ Sneak – Blue Funk Files (1997)
- The Last Emperor – Music, Magic, Myth (2003) ("Shine")
- La the Darkman – "Gunz Don't Kill" (2004)
- Northstar – Bobby Digital Presents Northstar (2004) ("Luv Allah", "Nuttin")
- Princess Superstar – My Machine (2005) ("I Like It a Lot")
