= You Don't Know Me: The Best of Armand Van Helden =

Greatest hits album by Armand Van Helden
- Released: October 25, 2008
- Recorded: 1996–2008
- Genre: Electronic; house
- Label: Southern Fried Records
- Producer: Armand Van Helden

Armand Van Helden chronology
Ghettoblaster (2007)	You Don't Know Me: The Best of Armand Van Helden (2008)

Professional ratings
Review scores
Source	Rating
AllMusic	4.5/5 stars

You Don't Know Me: The Best of Armand Van Helden is a greatest hits album by American electronic music producer and DJ Armand Van Helden, released on October 25, 2008 through the label Southern Fried Records. The album peaked at number 41 on the UK Albums Chart. The album includes all of Armand Van Helden's biggest hits. For the Australian release of the album it came with a bonus DVD featuring eleven music videos.

== Track listing ==
You Don't Know Me: The Best Of Armand Van Helden
No.	Title	Writer(s)	Album	Length
1.	"You Don't Know Me" (featuring Duane Harden)	Armand Van Helden	2 Future 4 U (1998)	4:02
2.	"The Funk Phenomena"	Armand Van Helden, Method Man	Old School Junkies: The Album (1996)	6:58
3.	"My My My" (featuring Tara McDonald)	Armand Van Helden, Andreas S. Jensen, Barry Mann, Cynthia Weil, Gary Wright, Joe Killington	Nympho (2005)	3:04
4.	"I Want Your Soul"	China Burton, Nick Straker	Ghettoblaster (2007)	3:11
5.	"NYC Beat"	Armand Van Helden	Ghettoblaster (2007)	3:06
6.	"Full Moon" (featuring Common)	Armand Van Helden, Lonnie Lynn, James Bedford	Killing Puritans (2000)	4:21
7.	"Witch Doktor"	Armand Van Helden	Strictly Rhythm EP 6 (1994)	3:24
8.	"Koochy"	Armand Van Helden, Gary Numan	Killing Puritans (2000)	3:20
9.	"Ultrafunkula"	Armand Van Helden	Sampleslaya: Enter the Meatmarket (1997)	5:40
10.	"Touch Your Toes" (featuring Fat Joe and Bl)	Armand Van Helden, Joseph Cartagena, Bryan LaMontagne	Ghettoblaster (2007)	5:32
11.	"Hear My Name" (featuring Spalding Rockwell)	Armand Van Helden, Mary Louise "ML" Platt, Nicole "Nikki" Lombardi	Nympho (2005)	3:29
12.	"This Ain't Hollywood" (featuring 'Tha Wiz' Lemay)	Armand Van Helden, William John Lemay	Ghettoblaster (2007)	3:50
13.	"Playmate" (featuring Roxy Cottontail and Lacole 'Tigga' Campbell)	Armand Van Helden, Andrea Summers	Ghettoblaster (2007)	4:25
14.	"Je T'aime" (featuring Nicole Roux)	Armand Van Helden, Nicole Roux	Ghettoblaster (2007)	3:33
15.	"Shake That Ass" (featuring Team Facelift)	Armand Van Helden	Shake That Ass / Ski Hard (2008)	3:25
16.	"Flowerz" (featuring Roland Clark)	Armand Van Helden, Roland Clark	2 Future 4 U (1998)	4:43
17.	"Ski Hard" (featuring Christian Rich)	Armand Van Helden	Shake That Ass / Ski Hard (2008)	2:59
18.	"Sugar" (featuring Jessy Moss)	Armand Van Helden, Jessy Moss	Nympho (2005)	3:27
19.	"Into Your Eyes"	Armand Van Helden, Andy Taylor	Nympho (2005)	2:49
20.	"When the Light Go Down"	Armand Van Helden, James McCulloch, Nick Gilder	Nympho (2005)	2:54
21.	"Illin' 'N' Fillin It" (featuring Netic From Game Rebellion)	Armand Van Helden	New York: A Mix Odyssey 2 (2008)	3:05

Disc 2 - Commissioned Remixes

1. "Professional Widow (It's Got to Be Big)" - Tori Amos
2. "Spin Spin Sugar" - Sneaker Pimps
3. "What You Waiting For" - Gwen Stefani
4. "Bizarre Love Triangle" - New Order
5. "Sugar Is Sweeter" - CJ Bolland
6. "Toxic" - Britney Spears
7. "Digital" - Goldie
8. "SexyBack" - Justin Timberlake & Timbaland
9. "Plug It In" - Basement Jaxx
10. "Da Funk" - Daft Punk

== Charts ==
Chart (2008)	Peak position
United Kingdom (UK Albums Chart)	41

== Release history ==
Country	Release date	Format	Label	Catalogue
Australia	October 25, 2008	CD Album	Liberator Music	LIB54CD
