= Thomas Gandey =

- Also known as: Cagedbaby, MATOM
- Born: Thomas Gandey; 21 March 1976 (age 50); Brighton, England
- Genres: Ambient; chillout; IDM; electro; house; alternative dance; electropop; techno; dance; electronic
- Occupations: Record producer; DJ; vocalist
- Instrument: Keyboards
- Labels: Southern Fried; Planet E Communications

Thomas Gandey (born 21 March 1976) is an English electronic music producer, composer, vocalist, keyboard player and former DJ, known for work under his own name as well as under his Cagedbaby pseudonym. He has released over 150 remixes to date including for Shirley Bassey, Ocean Colour Scene, Empire of the Sun, Fatboy Slim, The Temper Trap and Grace Jones, and DJed and performed live shows at many of the world's best-known clubs and festivals, including Womb, Glastonbury Festival, Fuji Rock Festival, and Tokyo's Big Beach Festival. He has been a resident at We Love Space Ibiza and Barcelona's Razzmatazz. He lived in the UK until 2006, and now splits his time between Bordeaux and Brighton.

== Early life and career ==
Born in Brighton, England, Gandey grew up under the musical influence of his grandfathers, one of whom was an orchestral conductor, the other a ragtime and boogie-woogie piano player. He learned to play the piano from the age of four, and after living next door to a church at the age of six where he practiced the organ; he began playing the instrument in school assemblies.

His first efforts at making a career out of music were as part of progressive rock band, Airport, and Brighton punk band, Thrillcreem. He discovered electronic music while working as a sound engineer at festivals, and soon took his musical endeavours in this direction. Meanwhile, his piano playing talents saw him become a session and touring keyboard player for many acts.

== 2004 - current: Cagedbaby ==
After spending several years playing keyboards for musicians, Gandey decided to pursue his love of electronic music with his own project. Gandey chose the name Cagedbaby for his first major electronic music project. "Either it's something to do with being linked to the earth, chained to Mother Nature by an unseen umbilical chord" he said in one interview in 2005. "Or I chose it because my releases would end up being next to The Chemical Brothers in the racks at HMV." In another interview in the same year, he claimed "the actual truth is that it was my email address on Hotmail when Hotmail first came out."

In 2002, he took some demos of his music to the Winter Music Conference in Miami and gave them to Fatboy Slim, who was suitably impressed with his music to sign him to his own Southern Fried Records label. His debut album Will See You Now was released in 2005, receiving a 4-star review from UK newspaper The Guardian and was followed by a stream of singles and remixes for pop and underground artists alike. The success of his album led him to becoming a tour DJ for Fatboy Slim, The Chemical Brothers and Underworld. 2006 saw him mix BBC Radio 1's Essential Mix show. He began contributing vocals to other producers' and bands' projects in 2009, when he appeared on a track by Italian duo Analog People In A Digital World. 2009 also saw him play the main stage at Scotland's RockNess festival, and take part in a collaborative art project with photographer Rankin for Youth Music.

Following a hiatus of several years, Cagedbaby returned with the Synthwave EP in December 2021. Attention from the EP was chosen by Lauren Laverne as her Record Of The Week on her BBC Radio 6 Music show. A new album Music for Somewhere Else will be released on his own label Uncaged Recordings in August 2022

Cagedbaby tracks have been released on labels including Innversions, Southern Fried Records, KOMPAKT and Planet E Communications. As A DJ, Gandey held residencies as Cagedbaby at Space Ibiza, Womb in Tokyo and Razzmatazz in Barcelona and recorded an episode of BBC Radio 1's Essential Mix.

== 2010 - current: Thomas Gandey ==
Gandey has been producing records and providing vocals under his own name since 2010 and as a producer and engineer for many other artists. He released further tracks on his 'home' label Southern Fried Records, German house/techno label Get Physical Music and on BBC Radio 1 DJ/producers Andy George & Jaymo's Moda Black. He has provided vocals for producers including Hot Since 82, Blond:ish and German Brigante.

He was also a writer and producer for the 11-times Lucille Lortell Awards nominated Imelda Marcos musical Here Lies Love, created by David Byrne and Fatboy Slim, and worked as a producer, programmer and keyboardist on Jeff Wayne's Musical Version of The War of the Worlds – The New Generation; a project, also featuring Gary Barlow and Liam Neeson. and continues to tour as keyboardist in the Arena Tours since 2012 up to the 2025 tour.

In 2012, he created a guest mix for Annie Nightingale's long running BBC Radio 1 show.

He has provided vocals for a track on UK house music producer Huxley's debut album Blurred, called "Never Easy", released in October 2014.

== 2012 - current: MATOM ==
MATOM is Gandey's techno project alongside fellow English producer Matt Edwards, which came to being after the duo were asked by Red Bull Music Academy to collaborate for a special live set at Berlin's Berghain club in September 2012. Follow-up shows were booked in Berlin, France and Poland, and the duo have produced an album that was released on Carl Craig's Planet E Communications in 2014.

== Selected discography ==
=== Albums ===
- Will See You Now (2005)

=== Singles and EPs ===
- Cagedbaby - Star (2003)
- Cagedbaby - 10 Inches Of Blue Eyed Soul w/ Grandadbob (2004)
- Cagedbaby - 16 Lovers (2005)
- Cagedbaby - Disco Biscuit (2005)
- Cagedbaby - Golden Triangle (2005)
- Cagedbaby - Hello There (2005)
- Cagedbaby - Bordeaux w/ Infusion (2006)
- Cagedbaby - Medicine (2009)
- Cagedbaby - Attention (2021)
- Cagedbaby - Amnesia w/ Radio Slave (2023)
- Thomas Gandey - Behind The Mask / Here's What You Do (2010)
- Thomas Gandey - Get It On / Mercy Hump (2010)
- Thomas Gandey - That Piano Track (2012)
- Thomas Gandey - The Organ Track (2012)
- Maxxi Soundsystem & Thomas Gandey - Shake Your Head (2012)
- Thomas Gandey & Zeb Wayne - Trust Me EP (2012)
- Thomas Gandey & Zeb Wayne - Breathe (2013)
- Thomas Gandey - The Cube EP (2013)
- Cagedbaby - That's The Trouble (2014)
- Cagedbaby & The Young Punx - Loving You Baby (2015)
- Thomas Gandey - Love Machine - (2016)
- Thomas Gandey - Pieces Of Me (2017)
- Thomas Gandey - To Find Reason (2017)
- Ghost Vision - Saturnus (2018)
- Ghost Vision - Sakuhachi (2018)
- Ghost Vision - Ozen (2019)
- Thomas Gandey & Mia Mendi - Cultum (2020)
- Cagedbaby & Dorothys Fortress - Attention (2021)
- Thomas Gandey & Mia Mendi - Ubi (2021)
- Thomas Gandey - We Survive (2021)
- Thomas Gandey & Santiago Garcia - On Two Strangers

=== Remixes ===
- Armand Van Helden - My My My (Cagedbaby Pace Mix) (2004)
- Sugababes - Red Dress (Cagedbaby Remix) (2006)
- MJ Cole feat. Laura Vane - Badboy (2006)
- 2 Bit Pie - Here I Come (Cagedbaby Remix) (2006)
- Shirley Bassey - Get The Party Started (2007)
- Ocean Colour Scene - I Told You So (Caged Baby Remix) (2007)
- Tracey Thorn - Raise The Roof (Cagedbaby Remix) (2007)
- The Brighton Port Authority feat. David Byrne & [Dizzee Rascal] - Toe Jam (Cagedbaby Remix) (2008)
- Empire Of The Sun - We Are the People (Cagedbaby Remix) (2009)
- The Temper Trap - Sweet Disposition (Caged Baby Paradise 54 Disco Mix (2009)
- Grace Jones - Love You To Life (Cagedbaby & Guy Williams Paradise 45 Rework) (2010)
- Howling - Signs (Radio Salve and Thomas Gandey Remix) (2015)
- Myd - Together We Stand (Thomas Gandey & Radio Slave Remix) (2020)
- Sailor & I - Thinking About You (Thomas Gandey Remix) (2021)

=== Vocals ===
- Analog People In A Digital World feat. Cagedbaby - Circus (2009)
- Blond:ish feat. Thomas Gandey - Strange Attractions EP (2012)
- Hot Since 82 - Things You Do To Me (2013)
- Thodoris Triantafillou & CJ Jeff feat. Thomas Gandey - Body Clock (2014)
- KatrinKa feat. Thomas Gandey - The Nameless One EP (Chapter 24 Records, 2016)

=== Compilations ===
- Southern Fried & Tested w/ The Mighty Dub Katz (2007)
- Thomas Gandey - 2010 Collection (2010)
- Southern Fried & Tested 3 w/ The 2 Bears (2011)
