= You Don't Know Me =

You Don't Know Me or U Don't Know Me may refer to:

== Music ==
=== Albums ===
- You Don't Know Me (George Cables album), 2008
- You Don't Know Me (Thomas Chapin album), 1995
- You Don't Know Me: The Best of Armand Van Helden, 2008
- You Don't Know Me: Classic Country, by Crystal Gayle, 2019
- You Don't Know Me: The Songs of Cindy Walker, by Willie Nelson, 2006
- You Don't Know Me, by Mickey Gilley, 1981
- U Don't Know Me (EP), by Brandy, 1999

=== Songs ===
- "You Don't Know Me" (Armand Van Helden song), 1999
- "You Don't Know Me" (Ben Folds song), 2008
- "You Don't Know Me" (Cindy Walker song), 1956; first recorded by Eddy Arnold, covered by several performers
- "You Don't Know Me" (Jax Jones song), 2016
- "U Don't Know Me" (Basement Jaxx song), 2005
- "U Don't Know Me" (T.I. song), 2005
- "U Don't Know Me (Like U Used To)", by Brandy, 1999
- "You Don't Know Me", by Apparat from Walls, 2007
- "You Don't Know Me", by Ariana Grande from My Everything, 2014
- "You Don't Know Me", by Autozamm, 2004
- "You Don't Know Me", by Caetano Veloso from Transa, 1972
- "You Don't Know Me", by Carole Bayer Sager from Sometimes Late at Night, 1981
- "You Don't Know Me", by Elizabeth Gillies from Victorious 3.0: Even More Music from the Hit TV Show, 2012
- "You Don't Know Me", by Gwen Stefani from This Is What the Truth Feels Like (non-album track), 2016
- "You Don't Know Me", by Jade Valerie from Out of the Box, 2007
- "You Don't Know Me", by Jay Sean from Me Against Myself, 2004
- "You Don't Know Me", by Luísa Sonza from Escândalo Íntimo, 2023
- "You Don't Know Me", by Meghan Trainor from Treat Myself, 2020
- "You Don't Know Me", by SOJA from Get Wiser
- "You Don't Know Me", by Son Lux from Bones, 2015
- "You Don't Know Me", by Suede from the Japanese CD edition of Autofiction, 2022
- "You Don't Know Me", by Tinashe from Nightride, 2016
- "You Don't Know Me", by Tracy Bonham from Down Here, 2000
- "U Don't Know Me", by Kid Rock from The Polyfuze Method, 1993

== Other uses ==
- You Don't Know Me (novel), a 2001 novel by David Klass
- You Don't Know Me, a 2017 novel by Imran Mahmood
- You Don't Know Me (TV series), a 2021 British series based on Imran Mahmood's novel
- "You Don't Know Me" (RuPaul's Drag Race), a television episode

== See also ==
- You Don't Know (disambiguation)
