= The Face (EP) =

EP by Disclosure
- Released: 4 June 2012
- Genre: Balearic beat; UK garage; dubstep; techno
- Length: 20:16
- Label: Greco-Roman
- Producer: Disclosure

Disclosure chronology
Carnival (2011)	The Face (2012)	Control (2013)

Singles from The Face
- 1. "Boiling" Released: 13 April 2012

The Face is the second extended play of British electronic music duo Disclosure, consisting of Guy and Howard Lawrence. It was released on 4 June 2012, by the Greco-Roman label, its remix EP, which features a re-cut of "Control" by Hot Chip's Joe Goddard, distributed in September 2012. The four-track record, which contains musical styles of balearic beat, UK garage, dubstep and techno, features vocal contributions from Sinéad Harnett and Ria Ritchie. It was described by one reviewer as more a "youthful" release of a dubstep and techno scene consisting of artists like James Blake and Little Dragon. The EP is a big departure from their previous works in terms of musical style, its few post-dubstep elements to be the only ones that were also present on their past releases. Promoted one single, "Boiling", and one music video for "Control", The Face garnered critical acclaim, major praises being towards the quality of the EP's musical style and song structures.

== Composition ==
The Face fuses the styles of balearic beat, UK garage, dubstep and techno. A DIY magazine critic, described The Face as a more "youthful" part of a dubstep and techno scene consisting of acts like James Blake and Little Dragon. XLR8R reviewer Glenn Jackson, noted that the EP's post-dubstep elements were the only ones on the record to have also been included on the duo's earlier works.

"Boiling", which starts The Face, opens with a R&B-infused landscape of "bruised color" synths, which are mostly associated with the works of future garage artists such as Jacques Greene, backing alto vocals by Sinéad Harnett. Big keyboard sounds, a deep house bassline, percussion including finger snaps and hi-hats commonly found in early 1990s garage music then pop into the song, as well as reverb effects on the vocals, before some bubbly synth textures "unravel" the song. "What's In Your Head" contains chops of high-pitched voice samples, a "distorted-beyond-recognition orgasm sample," and "spacey" "sun-bleached" synthesizers. The later part of the track consists of a harsh drum beat, stuttering vocal chops and "vamping" synth lines. According to The 405's James West, the song includes pop music elements similar to those in Be Strong, an album by duo The 2 Bears. Writing for Resident Advisor, Phillip Sherburne described the song's vocal snippets as cleaner versions of those found in the 1997 track "Fly Life" by Basement Jaxx.

"Control", with its main instrumental element identical to that of the beginning of "What's in Your Head", contains an "ethereal" arrangement of restrained synth sounds, bass drops mostly associated with those in tracks by El-B and M. J. Cole, "fidgety" drums, and staccato note singing from Ria Ritchie. The track starts flowing into a "widescreen reverb heavy fog" containing sustained and echo-filtered vocals before the instrumental turns minimalist again, a structure compared by Simon Edmunds of contactmusic.com to the "old loud/quiet/loud trick" that was prominent in many tracks by rock band Nirvana. "Control" is the only cut on the release to have a 2-step drum rhythm, unlike the EP's three other tracks that are driven by four-on-the-floor drum beats. The Face closes with the most playful cut on the EP, the balearic techno song "Lividup". Including chopped voice samples similar to those of artists like XXXY and Hot City, West analyzed the track's "upbeat euphoria is pasted over a backdrop of endless sunsets and bleary winkless nights."

== Release and promotion ==
"Boiling" was released as The Face's only single on 13 April 2012. The extended play was released on 4 June 2012 worldwide, by the Greco-Roman label. The remix EP features four re-cuts of songs from The Face, one of them being a remix by Hot Chip's Joe Goddard. On 29 June 2012, Noisey premiered the music video for "Control", directed by Ben Murray and Ross McDowell and produced by Drew O'Neill. Pigeons & Planes described the video as a "sort of stylish instructional video" in how to dance. The song was also played on Zane Lowe's Radio 1 show as the "Hottest Record in the World".

== Critical reception ==
Professional ratings
Review scores
Source	Rating
The 405	8/10
Beats per Minute	83%
DIY	8/10
Drowned in Sound	4/10
Resident Advisor	4/5
XLR8R	8/10

The Face garnered generally positive reviews from music journalists upon its release, later landing at number two and nine on the year-end lists of publications Beats per Minute and Pretty Much Amazing, respectively. Edmunds said that "releasing music of this quality at such an early age and so early into their career only makes one excited as to what the future holds for them", concluding his review that "The Face acts as a reminder to other producers to stay at the top of their game, because the kids are coming up from behind". Will Ryan, writing for Beats per Minute, called the record's four songs to be some of the best club tracks of all time, labeling it a "complete statement that overloads all possible cylinders, as vital as the ages of the producers behind it might suggest, delivered by a duo whose rise can only just qualify as meteoric". Sherburne, when interviewing Disclosure for Spin magazine, honored the EP as the duo's "best and most varied" release, noting its production to be "yielding a high-end that’s filigreed with crystal and compression so pneumatic that it seems to suck the air from your lungs".

DIY magazine highlighted the "effortless" aspect in how Disclosure made the tracks, stating that "there is a coherence that flows throughout without becoming stagnant which personifies the understanding the Lawrence brothers have not only for their desired results but for each other". West wrote that The Face was on the same level as the works of Jamie xx, Bobby Tank and SBTRKT, making Disclosure "the country's most exciting new producers". He also honored the EP for being one of the few releases to combine different styles together "cleverly". Jackson also compared The Face to SBTRKT's material, given that the record successfully works for both a club environment and a mainstream pop audience. However, his major criticisms were that all the tracks were too similar to each other, a problem further hurt by the EP's longer-than-20-minute runtime, and the vocal features were "underwhelming". One negative review from a Drowned in Sound critic called The Face a "disappointing miscalculation of overegged trends with little real personality of its own" that could only be enjoyed in a club setting, writing that the same "soulfulness" that was a major part of music by Joy Orbison was hard to find on the EP.

== Track listing and credits ==
All tracks written, mixed and produced by Disclosure and mastered by Miles Showell at Metropolis Mastering in London. Mastered for vinyl by Shane McEnhill at Finyl Tweek in London. Additional writing credits are noted in the track list.

The Face – Standard version
No.	Title	Additional writer(s)	Length
1.	"Boiling" (featuring Sinéad Harnett)	Sinéad Harnett	3:48
2.	"What's In Your Head"	Harnett	5:32
3.	"Control" (featuring Ria Ritchie)	Ria Ritchie	4:49
4.	"Lividup"		6:07
Total length:			20:16

The Face – Remixes EP
No.	Title	Length
1.	"Boiling" (Dixon remix featuring Sinéad Harnett)	9:34
2.	"What's In Your Head" (Mak & Pasteman remix)	6:37
3.	"Control" (Joe Goddard remix featuring Ria Ritchie)	4:45
4.	"Boiling" (Medlar remix featuring Sinéad Harnett)	5:53
Total length:		26:49

== Release history ==
Region	Date	Format(s)	Label
Worldwide	4 June 2012	Digital download	Greco-Roman
United Kingdom	9 July 2012	Vinyl	Greco-Roman
United Kingdom	September 2012	Vinyl – Remixes EP	Greco-Roman
