= Be Strong =

Be Strong may refer to:

== Music ==
=== Albums ===
- Be Strong (album), 2012 studio electronic album by The 2 Bears
- Be Strong, reggae album by Midnite
- Be I Strong, 1999 reggae song by Sizzla

=== Songs ===
- "Be Strong" (song), song by Delta Goodrem
- "Be Strong", reggae song by Frankie Paul
- "Be Strong", 1970 reggae song by Solomon Jones (musician)
- "Be Strong Now", song on Let It Come Down (James Iha album)
- "Be Strong", song on the 2 Bears album Be Strong

== See also ==
- Be Strong, Geum-soon!
