= Bear Hug =

Single by The 2 Bears

from the album Be Strong
- Released: 29 May 2011
- Genre: Tech house
- Length: 2:33
- Label: Southern Fried
- Songwriters: Joe Goddard, Raf Rundell

The 2 Bears singles chronology
| "Bear Hug" (2011) | "Work" (2012) |

"Bear Hug" is the debut single by British musical duo the 2 Bears. It was released on 29 May 2011 as a digital download in the United Kingdom. The song peaked to number 187 on the UK Singles Chart. The song features on the duo's 2011 Extended Play Bearhug and their album Be Strong.

Rolling Stone named the song the 42nd best song of 2012.

== Music video ==
A music video to accompany the release of "Bear Hug" was uploaded to YouTube on 20 June 2011 at a total length of three minutes and forty-eight seconds. The video was recorded at the same beach house as Armand Van Helden's "My My My" video.

== Chart performance ==
Chart performance for "Bear Hug"
| Chart (2011) | Peak position |
|---|---|
| UK Singles (The Official Charts Company) | 187 |
| UK Dance (Official Charts) | 26 |
| UK Indie (Official Charts) | 13 |

== Release history ==
Release history and formats for "Bear Hug"
| Region | Date | Format | Label |
|---|---|---|---|
| United Kingdom | 29 May 2011 | Digital download | Southern Fried |
