= What You Don't Know =

What You Don't Know may refer to:

- "What You Don't Know" (David Belbin novel), second in 'Bone and Cane' sequence
- What You Don't Know (Exposé album)
  - "What You Don't Know" (Exposé song), its title track
- What You Don't Know (Jon Randall album)
- "What You Don't Know" (Monrose song)
- "What You Don't Know", a song by Jonatha Brooke, the theme song for the TV series Dollhouse

== See also ==
- You Don't Know (disambiguation)
