= Bear Hug (disambiguation) =

"Bear Hug" is a 2011 single by The 2 Bears.

Bear Hug may also refer to:

- Bear hug, a move in wrestling
- Bear Hug, a play by Robin French
- Bear Hug, a 1964 Loopy De Loop cartoon
- "Bear Hug", a 1996 song by Fun Lovin' Criminals from Come Find Yourself
