= Why Can't You Free Some Time =

- CD single cover

Single by Armand Van Helden

from the album Gandhi Khan
- Released: 2001
- Genre: Electronic, house
- Length: 7:39
- Label: Southern Fried Records
- Songwriter(s): Dave Mason, Armand Van Helden
- Producer(s): Armand Van Helden

Armand Van Helden singles chronology
"Full Moon" (2000)	"Why Can't You Free Some Time" (2001)	"Hear My Name" (2004)

"Why Can't You Free Some Time" is a song by American electronic musician and producer Armand Van Helden, taken from his fifth album, Gandhi Khan, released in 2001. The song samples the track "Takin' the Time to Find" by Dave Mason.

== Charts ==
Chart (2001)	Peak position
Australia (ARIA)	197
Australian Club Chart	14
UK Singles (OCC)	22
