= Work (The 2 Bears song) =

Single by The 2 Bears

from the album Be Strong
- Released: 1 January 2012
- Genre: Electronic
- Length: 3:10
- Label: Southern Fried
- Songwriter(s): Joe Goddard, Raf Rundell

The 2 Bears singles chronology
"Bear Hug" (2011)	"Work" (2012)

"Work" is a song by London-based musical duo the 2 Bears. It was released as a single on 1 January 2012 as a digital download in the United Kingdom. The song is from their debut studio album Be Strong.

== Music video ==
A music video to accompany the release of "Work" was uploaded to YouTube on 12 January 2012 at a total length of three minutes and fourteen seconds.

== Track listing ==
Digital download

1. "Work" (Radio Edit) - 3:10
2. "Work" - 4:12
3. "Work" (Oliver $ Remix) -5:28
4. "Work" (Toddla T Remix)[feat. Trim, Scrufizzer & Trigganom] - 3:29
5. "Work" (Supabeatz Remix) - 5:01
6. "Work" (Franky Rizardo Remix) - 6:18

== Chart performance ==
Chart (2011)	Peak position
Belgium (Ultratip Bubbling Under Flanders)	49

== Release history ==
Region	Date	Format	Label
United Kingdom	1 January 2012	Digital Download	Southern Fried Records
