= Take a Look Around =

Take a Look Around may refer to:

- "Take a Look Around" (song), a song by Limp Bizkit
- Take a Look Around (album), an album by Masta Ace, or the title song
- "Take a Look Around", a song by The Temptations from Solid Rock
- "Take a Look Around", a song by James Gang from Yer' Album
- "Take a Look Around", song by the 2 Bears from Be Strong
