= Nympho (album) =

Studio album by Armand Van Helden
- Released: July 4, 2005
- Genre: House; electronic; nu-disco; big beat
- Length: 63:34
- Label: Southern Fried

Armand Van Helden chronology
New York: A Mix Odyssey (2004)	Nympho (2005)	Ghettoblaster (2007)

Professional ratings
Review scores
Source	Rating
AllMusic	2.5/5 stars
Pitchfork	3.9/10

Nympho is the sixth studio album by American electronic dance music producer Armand Van Helden, released in 2005.

== Track listing ==
1. "Nympho" (featuring Virgin Killer) – 4:15
2. "Come Play with Me" (featuring Créme Blush) – 3:52
3. "Into Your Eyes" – 3:59
4. "Sugar" (featuring Jessy Moss) – 5:33
5. "Brainwashing" (featuring Virgin Killer) – 6:04
6. "Hear My Name" (featuring Spalding Rockwell) – 3:27
7. "Hot City Nites" – 5:20
8. "Jenny" (featuring Spalding Rockwell) – 6:23
9. "When the Lights Go Down" – 5:10
10. "Juicy Juicy" (featuring Virgin Killer) – 4:38
11. "My My My" – 3:02
12. "Got Over You" (featuring Virgin Killer) – 4:52
13. "The Tear Drop" (featuring Tim Holtom) – 6:58

== Charts ==
Chart (2005)	Peak position
Australian Albums Chart	88
Belgian Albums (Ultratop Flanders)	46
UK Dance Albums (OCC)	20
UK Independent Albums (OCC)	27

== Release history ==
Country	Release date	Format	Label	Catalogue
Australia	July 4, 2005	CD	Southern Fried	ECB79CD
United Kingdom	July 4, 2005	CD	Southern Fried	
United States	August 2, 2005	CD	Southern Fried	
