= Chapter 24 Records =

English record label

Chapter 24 is an English record label based in London, England. Its three founders are Sam Pauli, Marcus Blacker and Paul Nolan. Their artists belong to the house and techno scene. The label's main theme is storytelling through electronic music.

== Collaborations ==
- Original cover artwork by Simon Vaeth
- Remixes of their tracks by Dave Seaman, Jonas Saalbach, Raphael Cerato, David Alexander, Van Did, Miyagi, Danny Oliveira, Luis Leon, Patlac, Petar Dundov...
- Events with Electric Dodo UK
- When We Dip showcases featuring Malbetrieb, Miyagi
- Amsterdam Dance Event (ADE)
- Moodroom : Gather Round events in London

== Artists ==
- Sam Pauli
- Paul Nolan
- KatrinKa
- Malbetrieb
- Miss Melera : DJ and producer of Dutch House and Techno (Amsterdam, Netherlands).
- Sezer Uysal
- Miyagi : DJ and producer of techno, tech-house and deep-house from Hamburg
- Third Son
- Oliver Schories
- Luis Leon : producer and DJ from Peru
- Javier Orduna; producer and DJ from Spain
- Kurt Baggaley
- Atapy

== Discography ==
RELEASES :

- [CH001] The Owl EP - Twelve Minds
- [CH002] Crystals EP - Quartz
- [CH003] Implications EP - Sam Pauli
- [CH004] Echo Gnomic EP - KatrinKa
- [CH005] Stargazer EP - Danny Oliveira
- [CH006] Goodbye EP - The White Shadow
- [CH007] Aspice EP - Sam Pauli & Reiver
- [CH008] Spiral EP - Kurt Baggaley
- [CH009] Lumina EP - David Durango
- [CH010] Lost Valleys EP - Several Definitions
- [CH011] Magenta EP - Miss Melera (15/01/2016)
- [CH012] Winterland EP - Kurt Baggaley (22/04/16)
- [CH013] North Sea EP - Häxeri
- [CH014] Atoms EP - Sam Pauli & Paul Nolan (26/02/2016)
- [CH015] Rho Persei EP - Sezer Uysal (18/03/2016)
- [CH016] Meun EP - Malbetrieb
- [CH017] Polyhymnia EP - AFFECT! & MAXIMILLION (03/06/16)
- [CH018] Distance EP - Rafael Cerato & The White Shadow
- [CH019] Redub EP - Atapy (05/08/16)
- [CH020] Artik EP - Oliver Schories (26/08/16)
- [CH021] The Nameless One EP - KatrinKa feat. Thomas Gandey (14/10/16)
- [CH022] Schwerkraft EP - Luis Leon (04/11/16)
- [CH023] Erretica EP - Javier Orduna (25/11/16)
- [ED001] - KatrinKa, Danny Oliveira, The WHite SHadow, Twelve Minds, Sam Pauli, Reiver
- [ED002] - KatrinKa, Billie Fountain, Rafael Cerato, Danny Oliveira, David Alexander, The WHite SHadow, Van Did, Twelve Minds, Naveen G, Sam Pauli & Reiver, Anton Dhouran
- [ED003] - The WHite SHadow, PHCK, Several Definitions, David Granha, Sezer Uysal, Luis Leon, Sam Pauli & Paul Nolan, Luke Garcia & Th3 Oth3r, KatrinKa feat. Thomas Gandey, Dan Grassler, Miss Melera, Jonas Saalbach, Kurt Baggaley, Petar Dundov, AFFECT! & Maximillion, David Durango, Camel Power Club, Reiver

MIXES :

- ADE Showcase MIX - Malbetrieb (21/10/16)

SEVEN STORIES SERIES (Compilations) :

- [SS001] Overcoming The Monster
- [SS002] Rags to Riches : featuring Oliver Schories, Darin Epsilon, Jobe, Roundhead, Christopher Ivor, KatrinKa, Shade of Light
- [SS003] The Quest : featuring Nhar, Dan Grassier, KnowKontrol, Alex Zed, Teho, Machino, Melodule, Van Did

SEVEN STORIES x The Techno Kittens : featuring Mano Le Tough, DkA, Yoram, Terranova, Kurt Baggaley, Kalipo, Roisin Murphy, Tom Demac
