= Sugar (Armand Van Helden song) =

- CD single cover

Single by Armand Van Helden

from the album Nympho
- Released: May 3, 2006
- Genre: Dance; house
- Label: Southern Fried Records
- Songwriters: Jessy Moss, Armand Van Helden

Armand Van Helden singles chronology
"When the Lights Go Down" (2005)	"Sugar" (2006)	"Touch Your Toes" (2007)

"Sugar" is the fifth and final single from American DJ Armand Van Helden's sixth album Nympho. It is written and sung by Jessy Moss.

== Track listing ==
CD Single

No.	Title	Length
1.	"Sugar (Radio Edit)"	3:30
2.	"Sugar (Original Club Mix)"	7:44
3.	"Sugar (Paper Faces Remix)"	6:35
4.	"Sugar (Paper Faces Dub)"	6:34
5.	"Sugar (Cagedbaby's Sugar Baby Remix)"	8:30
Total length:		32:53

== Charts ==
Chart (2006)	Peak position
Australia (ARIA)	144
UK Singles Chart	103
Finnish Single Charts	5

== Release history ==
Country	Release date	Format	Label	Catalogue
Australia	May 8, 2006	CD Single	Shock	ADICT159CD
