= Into Your Eyes =

2005 single by Armand Van Helden

- CD single cover

Single by Armand Van Helden

from the album Nympho
- Released: June 5, 2005
- Length: 3:59
- Label: Southern Fried
- Songwriter(s): Armand Van Helden, Andy Taylor
- Producer(s): Armand Van Helden

Armand Van Helden singles chronology
"Hear My Name" (2004)	"Into Your Eyes" (2005)	"When the Lights Go Down" (2005)

"Into Your Eyes" is the third single from American DJ Armand Van Helden's sixth album, Nympho (2005). The song's refrain is lifted from "I Might Lie", a 1987 rock hit by Andy Taylor.

== Music video ==
The music video parodies John Carpenter's 1988 film They Live, replacing the aliens by dancing women. In a key twist, however, the protagonist discovers at the end that he, too, is an alien dancing girl.

== Track listing ==
Australian CD single

1. "Into Your Eyes" (radio edit)
2. "Into Your Eyes" (original mix)
3. "Into Your Eyes" (Sant and Matteo Esse Remix)
4. "Into Your Eyes" (Sebastien Leger Remix)
5. "Into Your Eyes" (The Droyds Delinquent Remix)
6. "Into Your Eyes" (Savant Remix)

== Charts ==
Weekly chart performance for "Into Your Eyes"
Chart (2005)	Peak position
Australia (ARIA)	28
Belgium (Ultratop 50 Flanders)	31
Belgium (Ultratip Bubbling Under Wallonia)	11
Denmark (Tracklisten)	14
Finland (Suomen virallinen lista)	20
Greece (IFPI Greece)	25
Hungary (Dance Top 40)	3
Netherlands (Single Top 100)	53
Scotland (OCC)	47
UK Singles (OCC)	48
UK Indie (OCC)	4

== Release history ==
Region	Release date	Format	Label	Catalogue	Ref.
Australia	June 6, 2005	12-inch single; CD single	Southern Fried	ECB78CD	
