= David Belbin =

English novelist

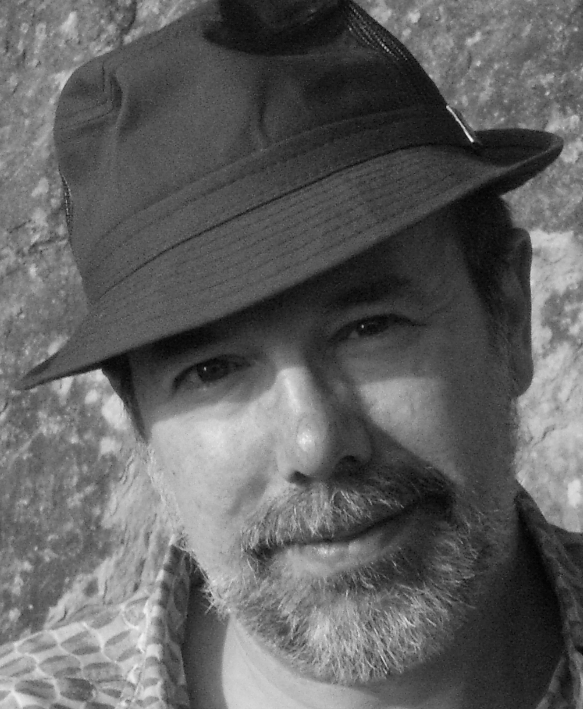
- Born: 1958 (age 67–68); Sheffield

David Lawrence Belbin (born 19 January 1958) is an English novelist.

He was born in Sheffield, Yorkshire and has lived in Nottingham since attending the University of Nottingham where he earned a degree in English Literature and American Studies. After university, he taught English and Media Studies in Nottingham before becoming a full-time writer in 1994. Since 2002, he has worked part-time at Nottingham Trent University, where he teaches Creative Writing.

Belbin began his career by writing Young Adult Fiction, where his work is known for breaking boundaries and dealing responsibly with difficult social issues that affect teenagers. He first attained success with a number of books for Scholastic's Point Crime series. One of these, Avenging Angel, led to his own popular series, The Beat, which followed a group of young police officers through their two-year probationary period, culminating in the adult novel length Fallen Angel in 2000. The series dealt with racism, rape, paedophilia and homosexuality as well as conventional crimes, often of the kind committed by teenagers.

Belbin's best-known Young Adult novel is Love Lessons, which was published in 1998. "It is a full-length novel which examines the machinations and morality of a sexual affair between a male English teacher and a fifteen-year-old female student," Belbin has said. "I wrote the first draft as an adult novel. The young-adult version took me nearly ten years and a brave editor to get right, but it turned out to be a better book for it." Denial, published in 2004, deals with a similar theme—a teacher accused of molesting a student—in the first person, and many readers found it even more shocking. His most popular novels this century are Festival (2002) about the Glastonbury Pop Festival, and The Last Virgin (2003) which is a wide ranging book about teenage sexuality: 'The author always chooses to understand rather than condemn. He has written numerous novels about young adults but this is his most outspoken.'

Since the publication of Nicked! in 1999, Belbin has written a string of short novels for 'reluctant' readers, often dealing with the same kind of edgy themes as his full-length work. Stray (2006) is about a girl gang and drug dealing, while Shouting at the Stars (2005) about the nervous breakdown of a disabled teenage singer/songwriter is one of many books that reflect Belbin's interest in popular music.

Belbin's fiction for adults reflects many of the same concerns as his work for teenagers, but without the limits dictated by Young Adult Fiction's place in Children's Literature. Witchcraft (Ambit magazine, 1989) is about ritual sexual abuse of children. Different Ways of Getting Drunk looks at a young woman's experiments with drugs and bisexuality. Vasectomy (Horizon magazine, 2008) shows a philandering Labour MP in the run up to the Iraq war. His first 'adult' novel, The Pretender (Five Leaves) was about literary forgery. He has also written an early guide to eBay and edited the Crime Express series of novellas which features work by both major and emerging crime writers.

Belbin's work has been translated into more than twenty-five languages. He had one of the world's first author websites (since 2000) and was an early user of Twitter, joining in 2007. He has written several comics on social issues for UNICEF including 'Cry Me A River', about globalisation. His 2015 contribution to the Dawn of The Unread graphic stories series, 'Shelves', is about his friendship with the novelist Stanley Middleton and the Nottingham novel.

In 2004, Belbin organised Turning Point, the UK's first national conference on Young Adult Fiction. It featured many significant Young Adult Fiction authors, including Kevin Brooks, Melvyn Burgess, Anne Cassidy, Keith Gray, Graham Marks, Nicola Morgan, Beverley Naidoo and Bali Rai. From 2012-19, he was a trustee of Nottingham Playhouse. For seven years, he chaired the company that successfully bid for Nottingham to become a Unesco City of Literature, the city receiving the award in December, 2015.

In 2011, Belbin began publishing a series of Nottingham-based novels about crime and politics, Bone And Cane, which follows a New Labour MP, Sarah Bone, and her ex-lover, convicted cannabis producer, Nick Cane, from 1997 onwards. The second novel in the sequence, "What You Don't Know" appeared in 2012. The same year saw his novel "Student", which chronicles the undergraduate years of a young woman in Nottingham and has been described as belonging to the emerging New-adult fiction genre. The third Bone and Cane novel, "The Great Deception" (Freight Books), appeared in 2015. Some scenes in this novel predate the previous two, filling in the mysterious back story of Sarah's family, including her Labour minister grandfather and father, who died of AIDS. The presumed final book in the sequence, "Death in the Family" appeared in 2022.

In 2016, Belbin was awarded a PhD by Published Works in Creative Writing and published 'Provenance', which collected short stories written between 1987 and 2015. His 2022 memoir, 'Don't Mention the Night', mainly set in the 1970s, weaves Belbin's story together with those of singer/songwriters Nick Drake, Kevin Coyne and Nottingham group, Gaffa.

In 2023, Belbin entered a civil partnership by special license with his partner of forty years, poet and educationalist, Sue Dymoke, four days before her death from cancer.

== List of notable works ==
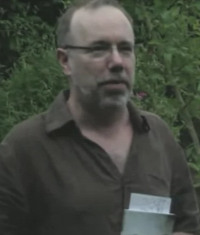
David Belbin on the book launch of Secret Gardens

=== Novels ===
- The Pretender (2008)
- Bone And Cane (2011)
- What You Don't Know (2012)
- Student (2012)
- The Great Deception (2015)
- Death in the Family (2022)
- Greeneland (2025-6)

=== Young Adult novels ===
- The Foggiest (1990)
- Shoot The Teacher (1993)
- Avenging Angel (1993)
- Final Cut (1994)
- Break Point (1995)
- Deadly Inheritance (1996)
- Dark Journey (1997)
- Love Lessons (1998)
- Dying For You (1999)
- Dead Guilty (2000)
- Festival (2001)
- The Last Virgin (2002)
- Denial (2004)

=== 'The Beat' series ===
- Missing Person (1995)
- Black and Blue (1995)
- Smokescreen (1996)
- Asking for It (1996)
- Dead White Male (1996)
- Losers (1997)
- Sudden Death (1997)
- Night Shift (1998)
- Victims (1998)
- Suspects (1999)
- Fallen Angel (2000)

=== Reluctant Reader novels ===
- Nicked (1999)
- Runaway Train (2000)
- Harpies (2001)
- Witness (2001)
- Gambler (2002)
- Coma (2004)
- Stray (2006)
- Shouting at the Stars (2005, abridged version 2008)
- China Girl (2009)
- Secret Gardens (2011)

=== Other books ===
- The Right Moment (1999, historical children's novel)
- Haunting Time (1999, short stories)
- Boy King (2002, historical children's novel)
- The eBay Book (2004, revised edition 2005)
- Provenance: New and Collected Stories (2016, short stories)
- Don't Mention the Night: a memoir (2023)

=== Books edited ===
- City of Crime (1997, short stories by writers connected with Nottingham)
- Middleton at Eighty (1999, with John Lucas, Festschrift for Booker Prize–winning Nottingham author)
- Harris's Requiem by Stanley Middleton (2006, new edition of Middleton's second novel, with introduction)
- 25: Celebrating 25 Years of NTU's MA in Creative Writing (2019, with Rory Waterman, poetry & prose anthology)
