= Da Club Phenomena =

Studio album by Armand Van Helden
- Released: 14 May 1997
- Genre: House music

Armand Van Helden chronology
Old School Junkies: The Album (1996)	Da Club Phenomena (1997)	Live From Ya Mutha's House (1996)

Da Club Phenomena is the first remix album by Armand Van Helden.

== Track listing ==
CD album

1. "Funk Phenomena" [Original Version]
2. "Witch Doktor"
3. "Psychic Bounty Killas" [Remix]
4. "Donkey"
5. "Break da 80's"
6. "Allright"
7. "Hey Baby"
8. "I Feel It"
9. "Work Me Gadamit '96"
10. "Funk Phenomena 2K" [Santos PandEmonio Remix]
11. "Funk Phenomena" [da Hool Remix]

== Release history ==
Country	Release date	Format	Label	Catalogue
United Kingdom	14 May 1997	CD Album		
