= When the Lights Go Down (Armand Van Helden song) =

2005 single by Armand Van Helden

- CD single cover

Single by Armand Van Helden

from the album Nympho
- Released: September 12, 2005
- Length: 5:10 (album version); 3:02 (radio edit)
- Label: Southern Fried
- Songwriters: Armand Van Helden; Nick Gilder; James McCulloch
- Producer: Armand Van Helden

Armand Van Helden singles chronology
"Into Your Eyes" (2005)	"When the Lights Go Down" (2005)	"Sugar" (2006)

"When the Lights Go Down" is the fourth single released from American DJ Armand Van Helden's sixth album, Nympho. It features samples from Nick Gilder's song "Rockaway", so he and James McCulloch are given writing credits. The song was released in Australia on September 12, 2005, and reached number 52 on the ARIA Singles Chart. In Europe, the song stalled at number 70 in the United Kingdom but entered the top 10 in Finland, where it reached number eight.

== Track listing ==
UK and Australian CD single

1. "When the Lights Go Down" (radio edit)
2. "When the Lights Go Down" (original club mix)
3. "When the Lights Go Down" (Deepgroove's Dirty House dub remix)
4. "When the Lights Go Down" (Backstage Sluts Drama remix)
5. "When the Lights Go Down" (Paul Masterson's Subway remix)
6. "When the Lights Go Down" (Trophy Twins Digital dub remix)

== Charts ==
Chart (2005)	Peak position
Australia (ARIA)	52
Belgium (Ultratip Bubbling Under Flanders)	10
Finland (Suomen virallinen lista)	8
Hungary (Dance Top 40)	12
Netherlands (Single Top 100)	89
Scotland Singles (Official Charts)	66
UK Singles (Official Charts)	70
UK Dance (Official Charts)	8
UK Indie (Official Charts)	8

== Release history ==
Country	Release date	Format(s)	Label(s)	Catalogue	Ref(s).
Australia	September 12, 2005	CD	Shock	ECB85CDS	
United Kingdom	September 19, 2005	CD	Southern Fried	ECB85CDS	
