= Je t'aime (Armand Van Helden song) =

Single by Armand Van Helden featuring Nicole Roux

from the album Ghettoblaster
- Released: January 26, 2008 (Australia)
- Recorded: 2007
- Genre: Electronic
- Length: 3:37 (Radio Edit)
- Label: Southern Fried Records
- Songwriters: Nicole Roux, Armand Van Helden

Armand Van Helden singles chronology
"I Want Your Soul" (2007)	"Je t'aime" (2008)	"Ski Hard" (2008)

Je t'aime is a song by American record producer and DJ Armand Van Helden, which is the fourth single taken from his seventh studio album, called Ghettoblaster. It features Nicole Roux on vocals. It samples heavily from the song 'Can You Dance' by Kenny 'Jammin' Jason and DJ Fast Eddie Smith, from 1987.

== Track listing ==
Australian CD Single

1. "Je T'Aime" (Radio Edit) - 3:37
2. "Je T'Aime" (Original Mix) - 7:21
3. "Je T'Aime" (Digital Dog Remix) - 7:27
4. "Je T'Aime" (Switch Remix) - 5:24
5. "Je T'Aime" (SMD Remix) - 7:25
6. "Je T'Aime" (Cagedbaby Remix) - 6:08

== Charts ==
Chart (2008)	Peak position
Australia (ARIA)	127
UK Single Charts	163

== Release history ==
Country	Release date	Format	Catalogue
Australia	January 26, 2008	CD Single	LIB33CD
