= Ghettoblaster (Armand Van Helden album) =

Studio album by Armand Van Helden
- Released: April 30, 2007
- Genre: House; freestyle; big beat
- Label: Southern Fried
- Producer: Armand Van Helden

Armand Van Helden chronology
Nympho (2005)	Ghettoblaster (2007)	You Don't Know Me: The Best of Armand Van Helden (2008)

Professional ratings
Review scores
Source	Rating
AllMusic	4.5/5 stars

Ghettoblaster is the seventh studio album by Armand Van Helden. The vocals on "I Want Your Soul" were sampled from "Do You Want It Right Now" by Siedah Garrett. The album was released in a special edition two-disc set as well as the standard edition. Some of the tracks are throwbacks to freestyle music which was popular in the 1980s.

== Track listing ==
Standard edition/Special edition disc 1

1. "Go Crazy!" (featuring Majida) – 6:50
2. "Touch Your Toes" (original 12-inch; featuring Fat Joe and BL) – 5:32
3. "I Want Your Soul" – 6:37
4. "NYC Beat" – 6:29
5. "Playing House" (featuring Kudu) – 6:01)
6. "This Ain't Hollywood" (featuring Will 'Tha Wiz' Lemay) – 3:50)
7. "Still in Love" (featuring Karmen) – 6:02
8. "Playmate" (featuring Roxy Cottontail & Lacole 'Tigga' Campbell) – 4:25
9. "Je T'Aime" (featuring Nicole Roux) – 7:18
10. "To Be a Freak" (featuring George Llanes) – 6:41
11. "All Night" (featuring La Rocka) – 4:31
12. "A Track Called Jack" – 6:17

Special edition disc 2

1. "NYC Beat" (MSTRKRFT Remix)
2. "I Want Your Soul" (TV Rock Remix)
3. "Touch Your Toes" (Stretch Armstrong 12")
4. "NYC Beat" (Detroit Mix)
5. "I Want Your Soul" (Tommy Trash Remix)
6. "Touch Your Toes" (featuring Fat Joe and BL)
7. "I Want Your Soul" (Wizard's Breaks Mix Featuring Mc Ivory)
8. "A Track Called Jack" (Jahawi's Jackin' Off Remix)
9. "Playmate" (featuring Roxy Cottontail + Lacole 'tigga' Campbell; Jesse Rose Remix)
10. "NYC Beat" (Emperor Machine Remix)
11. "Touch Your Toes" (Serge Santiago Remix)

== Charts ==
Chart (2007)	Peak position
Australian Dance Albums (ARIA)	23

== Release history ==
Country	Release date	Format	Edition	Label	Catalogue
Australia	April 28, 2007	CD	Standard	Warner	LIB17CD
Australia	September 22, 2007	CD	Special	Warner	LIB17CDX
