= Full Moon (Armand Van Helden song) =

2000 single by Common and Armand Van Helden

Single by Armand Van Helden featuring Common

from the album Killing Puritans
- Released: June 19, 2000
- Length: 4:22
- Label: Armed
- Songwriter(s): Armand Van Helden, Lonnie Lynn, James Bedford
- Producer(s): Armand Van Helden

Armand Van Helden singles chronology
"Koochy" (2000)	"Full Moon" (2000)	"Why Can't You Free Some Time" (2001)

Common singles chronology
"The 6th Sense" (2000)	"Full Moon" (2000)	"The Light" (2000)

"Full Moon" is the second single from Armand Van Helden's fourth studio album Killing Puritans (2000).

== Formats and track listings ==
CD single

1. "Full Moon" (clean radio edit) – 3:39
2. "Full Moon" – 4:22
3. "Koochy" (edit) – 3:22
4. "Koochy" (video) – 3:41

12" single

1. "Full Moon"
2. "Full Moon" (dub)

== Personnel ==
- Armand Van Helden – producer, mixing
- Common – vocals

Production

- Neil Petricone – executive producer
- Nilesh Patel – mastering

== Chart performance ==
Chart (2000)	Peak position
Australia (ARIA)	154
UK Singles Chart	133
