= Touch Your Toes =

Single by Armand Van Helden featuring Fat Joe & BL

from the album Ghettoblaster
- Released: April 21, 2007
- Genre: Electrohop, dance
- Length: 3:13
- Label: Southern Fried Records
- Songwriters: Armand Van Helden, Joseph Cartagena, Bryan LaMontagne
- Producer: Armand Van Helden

Armand Van Helden singles chronology
"Sugar" (2006)	"Touch Your Toes" (2007)	"NYC Beat" (2007)

"Touch Your Toes" is the first single from producer/DJ Armand Van Helden's seventh studio album, Ghettoblaster. It features Fat Joe and BL.

== Track listing ==
Australian CD single

No.	Title	Length
1.	"Touch Your Toes (Clean Radio Edit)"	3:07
2.	"Touch Your Toes (Dirty Radio Edit)"	3:13
3.	"Touch Your Toes (Original 12")"	5:36
4.	"Touch Your Toes (Lost Daze 12")"	6:45
5.	"Touch Your Toes (Stretch Armstrong 12")"	5:51
6.	"Touch Your Toes (Serge Santiago 12")"	6:47
7.	"Touch Your Toes (Audio Booty's 12")"	7:45
Total length:		39:04

== Charts ==
Chart performance for "Touch Your Toes"
Chart (2007)	Peak position
Australia (ARIA)	93
Finland (Suomen virallinen lista)	6
Sweden (Sverigetopplistan)	38
UK Singles Chart	145
