= I Want Your Soul =

Single by Armand Van Helden

from the album Ghettoblaster
- Released: September 29, 2007 (Australia)
- Recorded: 2007
- Length: 3:15
- Label: Southern Fried Records
- Songwriters: China Burton; Nick Straker
- Producer: Armand Van Helden

Armand Van Helden singles chronology
"NYC Beat" (2007)	"I Want Your Soul" (2007)	"Je t'aime" (2008)

"I Want Your Soul" is a song by American record producer and DJ Armand Van Helden, and the third single from his seventh studio album, Ghettoblaster. It contains a sample of "Do You Want It Right Now" by Siedah Garrett.

== Track listing ==
Australian CD single

1. "I Want Your Soul" (radio edit) – 3:15
2. "I Want Your Soul" (original) – 6:39
3. "I Want Your Soul" (TV Rock Remix) – 6:41
4. "I Want Your Soul" (Crookers Remix) – 5:01
5. "I Want Your Soul" (Hipp-E's Bonus Remix) – 1:22
6. "I Want Your Soul" (Fake Blood Remix) – 5:28

== Charts ==
Chart (2007)	Peak position
Australian ARIA Club Chart	1
Australian ARIA Singles Chart	85
Finnish Singles Chart	10
Hungary (Dance Top 40)	15
Hungary (Editors' Choice Top 40)	24
Swedish Singles Chart	13
UK Singles (Official Charts)	19
UK Dance Chart	1
US Billboard Hot Dance Airplay	3

Chart (2026)	Peak position
Ireland (IRMA)	100
Netherlands (Single Tip)	23

== Certifications ==
Region	Certification	Certified units/sales
United Kingdom (BPI)	Platinum	600,000^{‡}
^{‡} Sales+streaming figures based on certification alone.
