= Ria Ritchie =

English pop singer (born 1987)

- Born: Ria Ritchie; 23 September 1987 (age 38); Lowestoft, Suffolk, England
- Genres: R&B; neo soul; soul; acoustic
- Occupations: Singer; songwriter; musician
- Instruments: Vocals; guitar
- Years active: 2012–present
- Label: Unsigned
- Website: riaritchie.com

Ria Ritchie (/riˈɑː/ ree-AH; born 23 September 1987) is an English singer-songwriter and recording artist. Signed to Takeover Entertainment in 2011, she released her debut single, entitled "Only One", in May 2012.

== Life and career ==
=== Early life ===
Ria Ritchie was born and grew up in Lowestoft, a seaside resort and resort town on the North Sea coast of England and the most easterly point of the United Kingdom. Her father is South African and her mother is English. She is the younger sister of actor Reece Ritchie, actor in the American films 10,000 BC and Prince of Persia: The Sands of Time.

=== Career: 2012–present ===
Ria Ritchie released videos of her covering other artists songs with the guitar, receiving over 11 million views on YouTube. In December 2009, Ria began writing songs with Plan B, then in 2010, she created a studio partnership with songwriter Ruth-Anne Cunningham, who co-wrote Pixie Lott's debut album Turn It Up.

In 2010, Ria began talks with the discoverer of Rihanna and Ne-Yo, Jay Brown – business partner to rapper and entrepreneur Jay-Z. Ria was signed in 2011 by Takeover Entertainment who signed a contract with Jay-Z's entertainment company, Roc Nation.

In May 2012, Ria Ritchie released her first single, "Only One", and an extended play in 2012, with a debut album released in February 2013.

== Artistry ==
=== Musical style ===
Ria Ritchie's style of music yearned from when she started singing from the age of 12. She taught herself the guitar from the age of 17. She grew up listening to a lot of Motown and soul music and her music is influenced by artists such as Alicia Keys, Beyoncé, Keisha White, John Legend, Aretha Franklin, Lauryn Hill, Plan B, Marvin Gaye, Stevie Wonder, and Al Green. She has done a few covers from some of these artists on her YouTube page.

=== Voice ===
Ria Ritchie is an alto lyric coloratura soprano with a vocal range type spanning more than four octaves (scientific pitch notation: E3–D7).

== Discography ==
=== Singles ===
Year	Title	Peak chart positions		Album
Year	Title	UK	US	Album
2012	"Only One"	—	—	—N/a

=== As featured artist ===
Year	Title	Peak chart positions	Album
Year	Title	UK	Album
2012	"Control" (Disclosure feat. Ria Ritchie)	—	The Face

=== Music videos ===
Year	Title	Director	Ref.
2012	"Only One"	Luke Monaghan, James Barber	
2012	"Control" (with Disclosure)	Ben Murray, Ross McDowell	
