= Koochy =

2000 single by Armand van Helden

- US 12-inch single artwork

Single by Armand van Helden

from the album Killing Puritans
- B-side: "Phreeknik"
- Released: May 8, 2000
- Length: 3:19
- Label: Armed
- Songwriters: Armand van Helden; Gary Numan
- Producer: Armand van Helden

Armand van Helden singles chronology
"Flowerz" (1999)	"Koochy" (2000)	"Full Moon" (2000)

"Koochy" is a song by American DJ Armand van Helden. It was released on May 8, 2000, as the lead single from his fourth studio album, Killing Puritans (2000). It heavily samples Gary Numan's 1979 single "Cars".

== Track listings ==
US 12-inch single

A. "Koochy"
B. "Phreeknik"

UK CD1

1. "Koochy" (edit)
2. "Koochy" (long version)
3. "Phreeknik"

UK CD2

1. "Koochy" (edit)
2. "U Don't Know Me" (edit)
3. "Reservoir Dogs"

UK cassette single

1. "Koochy" (edit)
2. "U Don't Know Me" (edit)

Australian CD single

1. "Koochy" (edit)
2. "Koochy" (long version)
3. "Phreeknik"
4. "U Don't Know Me" (edit)

== Charts ==
=== Weekly charts ===
Weekly chart performance for "Koochy"
Chart (2000)	Peak position
Australia (ARIA)	71
Belgium (Ultratop 50 Flanders)	38
Belgium (Ultratip Bubbling Under Wallonia)	4
Canada Dance/Urban (RPM)	5
Ireland (IRMA)	29
Scottish Singles Sales (Official Charts)	7
UK Singles (Official Charts)	4
US Dance Singles Sales (Billboard)	24

=== Year-end charts ===
Year-end chart performance for "Koochy"
Chart (2000)	Position
UK Singles (OCC)	174
