= Flowerz =

1999 single by Armand van Helden

- US and Canadian cover

Single by Armand van Helden featuring Roland Clark

from the album 2 Future 4 U
- Released: April 19, 1999
- Length: 9:38
- Label: FFRR
- Songwriters: Armand van Helden; Roland Clark
- Producer: Armand van Helden

Armand van Helden singles chronology
| "U Don't Know Me" (1999) | "Flowerz" (1999) | "Koochy" (2000) |

Alternative covers
- UK cover

"Flowerz" is a song by American record producer Armand van Helden featuring vocals from American musician Roland Clark. The song samples from Donald Byrd's 1974 track "Think Twice" from his Stepping into Tomorrow album. "Flowerz" was released on April 19, 1999, as the follow-up single to van Helden's "You Don't Know Me".

== Track listings ==
UK CD single

1. "Flowerz" (radio edit)
2. "Flowerz" (12-inch version)
3. "Flowerz" (dubstrumental version)

US CD single

1. "Flowerz" (radio edit)
2. "Summertime"
3. "Flowers" (TV track)
4. "Flowerz" (original mix)

== Charts ==
=== Weekly charts ===
| Chart (1999) | Peak position |
|---|---|
| Belgium (Ultratip Bubbling Under Flanders) | 7 |
| Canada Dance/Urban (RPM) | 1 |
| Europe (Eurochart Hot 100) | 61 |
| France (SNEP) | 77 |
| New Zealand (Recorded Music NZ) | 24 |
| Scottish Singles Sales (Official Charts) | 17 |
| UK Singles (Official Charts) | 18 |
| UK Dance (Official Charts) | 6 |

=== Year-end charts ===
| Chart (1999) | Position |
|---|---|
| Canada Dance/Urban (RPM) | 22 |

== Release history ==
| Region | Date | Format(s) | Label(s) | Ref. |
|---|---|---|---|---|
| United Kingdom | April 19, 1999 | 12-inch vinyl; CD; cassette | FFRR | |
| Canada | May 25, 1999 | CD | SPG | |
