= NYC Beat =

Single by Armand Van Helden

from the album Ghettoblaster
- Released: 2 July 2007
- Genre: House
- Length: 3:14
- Label: Southern Fried Records
- Songwriter(s): Armand Van Helden
- Producer(s): Armand Van Helden

Armand Van Helden singles chronology
"Touch Your Toes" (2007)	"NYC Beat" (2007)	"I Want Your Soul" (2007)

"NYC Beat" is a song by Armand Van Helden. It was released on 2 July 2007 as the second single from his seventh studio album, Ghettoblaster (2007). It is a cover/sample of the early 1980s single "New York City Beats", performed by Fenton Bailey and Randy Barbato, performing as the Fabulous Pop Tarts.

== Music video ==
At the beginning of the video, the date circled is Wednesday 10 June, the next time those dates fall into the calendar at the time was 2009.

The video stars Daisy Lowe (brunette) and Leah Hibbert (from Shipwrecked: Battle of The Islands) and another unidentified blond model partaking in a variety of apple-related activities.

== Track listings ==
Australia CD single

1. "NYC Beat" (Radio Edit) – 3:14
2. "NYC Beat" (Original) – 6:27
3. "NYC Beat" (MSTRKRFT Remix) – 4:58
4. "NYC Beat" (Emperor Machine Remix) – 8:03
5. "NYC Beat" (Detroit Remix) – 8:09
6. "NYC Beat" (Prince Language Remix) – 7:15

12"

1. NYC Beat (Original)
2. NYC Beat (MSTRKRFT Remix)
3. NYC Beat (Emperor Machine Dub)

== Chart history ==
Chart (2007)	Peak position
Australia (ARIA)	36
UK Singles (OCC)	22
