= Gandhi Khan =

Album by Armand Van Helden

Studio album by Armand van Helden
- Released: June 14, 2002
- Genres: Electronic; house
- Label: Armed Records Inc.

Armand van Helden chronology
| Killing Puritans (2000) | Gandhi Khan (2002) | New York: A Mix Odyssey (2004) |

Gandhi Khan is the fifth studio album by the American electronic musician Armand Van Helden, released on June 14, 2002. The album contains the song "Why Can't U Free Some Time" which reached number 34 on the UK Singles Chart.

== Track listing ==
| No. | Title | Length |
|---|---|---|
| 1. | "Karma Knowledge" | 0:13 |
| 2. | "Gandhi Khan" | 4:32 |
| 3. | "I Can Smell U" | 7:27 |
| 4. | "Mongoloid Sessions" | 0:43 |
| 5. | "Why Can't U Free Some Time" | 7:37 |
| 6. | "Don Chiconelli Pt. 1" | 0:57 |
| 7. | "The Robots Are Cumming" | 6:35 |
| 8. | "Kentucky Fried Flow" | 6:35 |
| 9. | "Oxtail and Curried Goat" | 0:29 |
| 10. | "Doovoodoo" | 4:24 |
| 11. | "Don Chiconelli Pt. 2" | 0:21 |
| 12. | "(Girl) You Got Me" | 5:09 |
| 13. | "Scarface Wiggle" | 0:18 |
| 14. | "Chocolate Covered Cherry" | 7:09 |
| 15. | "The Great Serpent God" | 0:21 |
| 16. | "Heed the White Seed" | 5:15 |
| 17. | "Flyaway Love Pt. 2" | 8:37 |
| 18. | "Good Whoman Being" | 1:02 |
| Total length: | | 67:44 |

== Release history ==
| Country | Release date | Format | Label | Catalogue |
|---|---|---|---|---|
| United Kingdom | June 14, 2002 | CD Album | Southern Fried | ARM19CD |
| Australia | August 5, 2002 | CD Album | London | 0927410462 |
