= The Funk Phenomena =

Single by Armand van Helden

from the album Old School Junkies: The Album
- Released: 1996
- Genre: Hip house; funk
- Label: Henry Street Music
- Songwriters: Armand van Helden; Method Man
- Producer: Armand van Helden

Armand van Helden singles chronology
"Cha Cha" (1996)	"The Funk Phenomena" (1996)	"Ultrafunkula" (1997)

Music video
- "The Funk Phenomena" on YouTube

"The Funk Phenomena" is a single from American DJ, record producer, remixer and songwriter Armand van Helden's debut studio album, Old School Junkies: The Album (1996). It was released in 1996 by label Henry Street Music, and uses samples from "How High" by Method Man & Redman, "Who Is He (And What Is He to You)" by Creative Source and "Don't Throw My Love Around" by Cooly's Hot Box. In 2025, Billboard magazine ranked "The Funk Phenomena" number 66 in their list of "The 100 Best Dance Songs of All Time".

== Formats and track listings ==
- CD single (1)
1. "The Funk Phenomena"
2. "The Funk Phenomena" (radio edit 1)
3. "The Funk Phenomena" (radio edit 2)
- CD single (2)
1. "The Funk Phenomena" (original mix)
2. "The Funk Phenomena" (radio edit)
3. "The Funk Phenomena" (Johnickennydope Mastermix)
4. "The Funk Phenomena" (Edge Factor dub)
5. "The Funk Phenomena" (Ras mix)
6. "The Funk Phenomena" (Ms. T's Phenomenal mix)
7. "The Funk Phenomena" (Johnick Manhattan Special mix)
8. "The Funk Phenomena" (X-Mix remix)
- 12" single (1)
1. "The Funk Phenomena" (Johnickennydope Mastermix)
2. "The Funk Phenomena" (original mix)
3. "The Funk Phenomena" (Matthias edit 1)
4. "The Funk Phenomena" (Matthias edit 2)
5. "The Funk Phenomena" (Ras mix)
6. "The Funk Phenomena" (Ras mix 2)
7. "The Funk Phenomena" (Ms. T's Phenomenal mix)
8. "The Funk Phenomena" (Edge Factor dub)
- 12" single (2)
1. "The Funk Phenomena" (Johnick Manhattan Special mix)
2. "The Funk Phenomena" (X-Mix remix)
3. "The Funk Phenomena" (Ms. T's Phenomenal Mix)
4. "The Funk Phenomena" (radio edit)
5. "The Funk Phenomena" (Johnickennydope Mastermix)
6. "The Funk Phenomena" (original mix)
7. "The Funk Phenomena" (Ras mix)
8. "The Funk Phenomena" (Edge Factor dub)
- Amazon.com Exclusive
1. "The Funk Phenomena" (Da Hool Remix)
2. "The Funk Phenomena" (Mo-Ryn's Electrobreaker Remix)
3. "The Funk Phenomena" (Santos Pandemonium Remix)
4. "The Funk Phenomena" (Sound Bluntz Remix)
5. "The Funk Phenomena" (X-Mix Remix)

== Personnel ==
- Armand Van Helden – producer

=== Sample credits ===
- "How High" by Method Man & Redman
- "Who Is He (And What Is He to You)" by Creative Source
- "Don't Throw My Love Around" by Cooly's Hot Box.

== Charts ==
Chart (1996–2003)	Peak position
Belgium (Ultratop 50 Wallonia)	37
Canada (Nielsen SoundScan)	19
Canada Dance/Urban (RPM)	1
France (SNEP)	39
Germany (GfK)	51
Netherlands (Single Top 100)	67
UK Singles (OCC)	38
US Billboard Bubbling Under Hot 100	2
