= Womb (nightclub) =

Nightclub in Tokyo, Japan

Womb is a nightclub in Tokyo, Japan that is featured in the film Babel.

== History ==
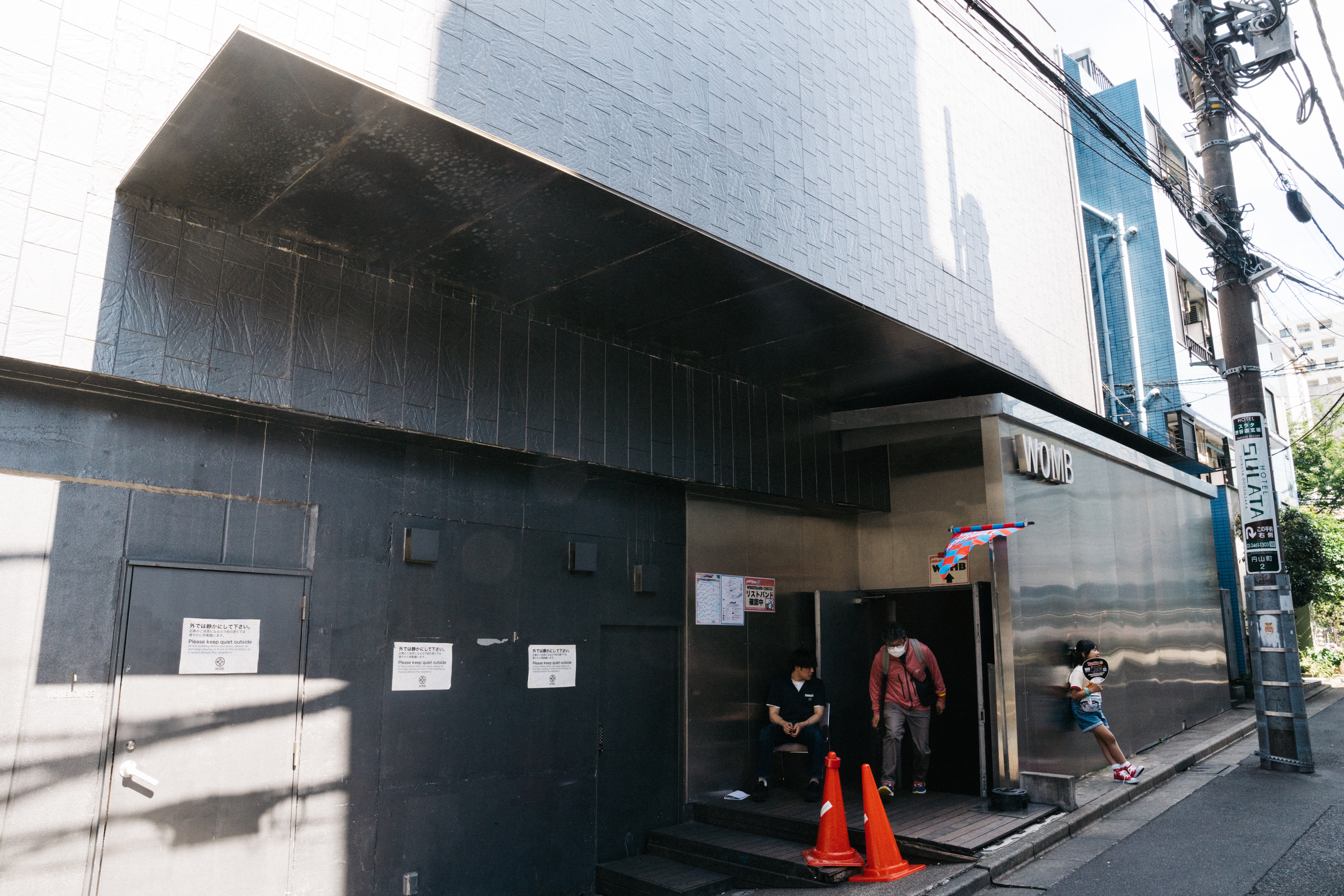
Entrance of Womb (2023)

Womb opened in April 2000 with a Junior Vasquez party and is located at 2-16 Maruyama-cho Shibuya-ku.

The main floor, with a giant mirror ball, is on the second floor of the premises, while a small bar is located at the rear of the dance floor. The main DJ booth overlooks the main floor and for select artists, the DJ booth is relocated onto the actual dance floor. In addition to the DJ booth, another bar, with open windows that look down onto the dance floor, also exists.

Giant Mirror Ball

On the fourth floor is another bar, a chill-out lounge and a DJ usually plays here as well. The fourth floor features glass walls, which do not open for safety reasons, that look down onto the dance floor two floors below.

== Visiting artists ==
The list of musical artists who have performed at Womb include:

- Mark Knight
- Luca Torre
- Surgeon
- Ken Ishii
- Jeff Mills,
- Ben Sims
- Paul Mac
- 2manydjs
- The Chemical Brothers
- Aaron Benjamin
- John Digweed
- Danny Howells
- Miss Kittin
- Sasha
- Deep Dish
- Richie Hawtin
- Shibachoff
- Sven Väth
- Paul Oakenfold
- Steve Aoki
- Muscles (Live)
- Magda
- Ambivalent
- Gaiser
- Nathan Fake
- Diplo
- DJ Hype
- Dexpistols
- DJ Sega
- Shinichi Osawa
- Little Nobody
- Pendulum (drum and bass band)
- Deadmau5
- Laurent Garnier

== Record label ==
The Womb Recordings music label was founded in 2006 and is managed by the Arights Music Entertainment Company. However, Womb Recordings recordings were released prior to 2006, with the release of Christian Smith's Live @ Womb 01: The Sound Of Tronic Treatment, a live mix recorded at the club, in April 2003.

The last release from the label was recorded by Chris Liebing in 2006, who recorded a live mix at the club that was also released on his own CLR music label. Titled Live @ Womb 03, the recording features three tracks that were remixed by Liebing himself: "Plutonium" by Cave; "Sweetbox" by Motor; and "Tresor West" by The Advent.

== Management ==
According to the Womb website, the management arm of the company manages a total of seven artists: AKR, AKI, Dexpistols, Dr.Shingo, Naohiro Yako, Ohnishi and Techriders.

== See also ==
- List of electronic dance music venues
