= What You Don't Know (David Belbin novel) =

What You Don't Know is the second novel in the Bone and Cane sequence by David Belbin and was published in 2012. It was partly inspired by real life events in the late 1990s when Nottingham's Crack Awareness team (which Belbin calls the 'Crack Action Team') was run by one of the city's biggest drug dealers. Belbin sets his novel in the aftermath of this scandal, rather than the scandal itself. The novel also deals with prostitution in the city's care homes, where protagonist Nick Cane is tutoring Jerry, the underage girlfriend of a dealer. Belbin's other protagonist, Sarah Bone, MP, meanwhile, is suspected of murder, putting her ministerial career at risk.

Reviewing the novel in The Guardian, Cathi Unsworth wrote "It's a story rich in resonance: of how New Labour sold out, leaving the children of cities such as Nottingham easy prey for organised crime; and a perceptive study of how the abuse of girls like Jerry is fuelling one almighty tinderbox." Joan Smith in The Times described it as "a smart novel that recreates the heady atmosphere of Labour’s first months in power".

In an essay about the book, Belbin describes how he avoided naming the Labour Home Secretary and discusses the ethics of using living figures in a novel. He talks about the assistance he was given by serving and former Labour MPs and reveals that one storyline was inspired by a girl he taught in the 1990s.
