= 2 Future 4 U =

Studio album by Armand van Helden
- Released: November 30, 1998
- Genre: House
- Length: 74:03
- Label: Tinted
- Producer: Armand van Helden; Neil Pettricone

Armand van Helden chronology
Greatest Hits (1997)	2 Future 4 U (1998)	Armand Van Helden's Nervous Tracks (1999)

Singles from 2 Future 4 U
- 1. "U Don't Know Me" Released: January 25, 1999; 2. "Flowerz" Released: April 19, 1999

Professional ratings
Review scores
Source	Rating
AllMusic	4/5 stars

2 Future 4 U is the third studio album by American record producer Armand Van Helden. It was released on November 30, 1998, by Tinted and includes the singles "U Don't Know Me" and "Flowerz".

== Track listing ==
All tracks are written by Armand Van Helden, except where noted.

2 Future 4 U track listing
No.	Title	Writer(s)	Length
1.	"Mother Earth" (featuring Tekitha)	Van Helden; Tekitha Washington	9:50
2.	"The Boogie Monster"		7:06
3.	"Business as Usual"		2:06
4.	"Psychic Bounty Killaz" (featuring DJ Sneak)		7:44
5.	"Rock Da Spot" (featuring Mr Len)		5:28
6.	"U Don't Know Me" (featuring Duane Harden)		8:03
7.	"Alienz"		7:49
8.	"Summertime" (featuring Mi Madre)		3:56
9.	"Yeast"		0:16
10.	"Necessary Evil"		4:25
11.	"Entra Mi Casa" (featuring Mita)		7:26
12.	"Flowerz" (featuring Roland Clark)	Van Helden; Roland Clark	9:38

== Charts ==
Chart performance for 2 Future 4 U
Chart (1998–1999)	Peak position
Australian Albums (ARIA)	73
Belgian Albums (Ultratop Flanders)	39
French Albums (SNEP)	30
New Zealand Albums (RMNZ)	50
Norwegian Albums (VG-lista)	36
UK Albums (OCC)	22

== Release history ==
Release history and formats for 2 Future 4 U
Country	Release date	Format	Label
Australia	May 4, 1999	CD	Tinted
