= Be Strong (album) =

Studio album by The 2 Bears
- Released: 30 January 2012
- Recorded: 2010–2011
- Genre: Electronic
- Label: Mercury

The 2 Bears chronology
Be Strong (2012)	The Night Is Young (2014)

Singles from Be Strong
- 1. "Bear Hug" Released: 29 May 2011; 2. "Work" Released: 1 January 2012

Professional ratings
Aggregate scores
Source	Rating
Metacritic	8.0
Review scores
Source	Rating
Beats Per Minute	78%
Clash	8/10
Consequence of Sound	C-
DIY	7/10
Drowned in Sound	8/10
The Guardian	4/5 stars
NME	7/10
The Observer	4/5 stars
Pitchfork	7.3/10
State	4/5 stars

Be Strong is the debut studio album by English electronic musical duo The 2 Bears. It was released on 30 January 2012 through Southern Fried Records. The album includes the singles "Bear Hug" and "Work". Commercially, album peaked at number 35 on the UK Albums Chart.

== Singles ==
- "Bear Hug" was released as the album's lead single on 29 May 2011. The song peaked to number 187 on the UK Singles Chart, number 13 on the UK Indie Chart and number 26 on the UK Dance Chart.
- "Work" was released as the album's second single on 1 January 2012.

== Track listing ==
Be Strong track listing
No.	Title	Length
1.	"The Birds & the Bees"	4:21
2.	"Be Strong"	4:42
3.	"Bear Hug"	4:05
4.	"Work"	4:12
5.	"Warm & Easy"	3:02
6.	"Take a Look Around"	5:16
7.	"Ghosts & Zombies"	4:04
8.	"Time in Mind"	3:07
9.	"Increase Your Faith"	4:20
10.	"Heart of the Congos"	5:04
11.	"Get Together"	3:53
12.	"Church"	6:01
13.	"Shakedown"	10:55

== Chart performance ==
Chart performance for Be Strong
Chart (2012)	Peak position
Australian Albums (ARIA)	83
Australian Dance Albums (ARIA)	14
UK Albums Chart	35

== Release history ==
Release history for Be Strong
Country	Release date	Format(s)	Label
United Kingdom	30 January 2012	Digital download	Southern Fried
