= Hear My Name =

- CD single cover

Single by Armand Van Helden featuring Spalding Rockwell

from the album Nympho
- Released: June 7, 2004
- Label: Southern Fried Records
- Songwriters: Armand Van Helden, Mary Louise Platt and Nicole Lombardi
- Producer: Armand Van Helden

Armand Van Helden singles chronology
"Why Can't You Free Some Time" (2001)	"Hear My Name" (2004)	"My My My" (2004)

Spalding Rockwell singles chronology
"Hear My Name" (2004)

"Hear My Name" was the first single from Armand Van Helden's mix album, New York: A Mix Odessey, and his fifth album, Nympho. The track features vocals by duo Spalding Rockwell (Nicole Lombardi, Mary Louise Platt). It was also made into a music video featuring the female duo Spalding Rockwell spanking various men and women.

== Track listing ==
Australian CD Single

1. Hear My Name (Radio Edit)
2. Hear My Name (Original 12' Mix)
3. Hear My Name (Solid Groove Hear My Rub Mix)
4. Hear My Name (Solid Groove Hear My Dub Mix)

== Chart performance ==
The single was a worldwide Dance and Club hit, and a minor success in Single charts.

Chart (2004)	Peak position
Australia (ARIA)	32
Belgium (Ultratop 50 Flanders)	44
Germany (GfK)	84
Italy (FIMI)	58
UK Singles (The Official Charts Company)	34
US Billboard Hot Dance Music/Club Play	7

== Release history ==
Country	Release date	Format	Label	Catalogue
Australia	June 7, 2004	CD Single	Epic	674998.2
