= Killing Puritans =

Studio album by Armand van Helden
- Released: June 26, 2000
- Length: 73:41
- Label: Armed

Armand van Helden chronology
Armand Van Helden's Nervous Tracks (1999)	Killing Puritans (2000)	Gandhi Khan (2002)

Killing Puritans is the fourth studio album by Armand van Helden released in 2000. It was released as CD and as quadruple vinyl.

== Controversy ==
The album's cover art prominently featured an African child soldier, prone, aiming a rifle. The image was controversial enough to threaten the album to be banned worldwide. Eventually, UK versions of the album were sold in a plain brown cardboard sleeve that concealed the offending image.

== Critical reception ==
Professional ratings
Review scores
Source	Rating
AllMusic	3/5 stars
NME	3.5/5 stars
The Village Voice	(dud)

Critical reception to the album was varied, with coverage ranging from mostly positive, to mixed to significantly negative.

A reviewer for AllMusic felt that the music was better suited to nightclubs rather than personal listening, with heavy club themes alongside freestyle rapping and "diva theatrics". The music was generally considered to be an enjoyable blend of several different genres but lacking in anything to make it a true hit.

An NME review was generally positive towards the music quality of the songs played, again noting of the skill set across multiple genres. However it was criticized for its attempts to claim social relevance, particularly in relation to Armand's claims to breaks taboos, while failing to make any clear-cut social indication and is instead similar to the dance industry most criticized by the author.

A critic for LA Weekly called Killing Puritans "a very bad album, both in its politics and its sound", indicating that the mix of genres complimented elsewhere in fact reduced any coherence of the album, rendering it as a mixture of songs - with further criticism of the quality of most.

A review in Exclaim! gave a mixed analysis of Killing Puritans. Many of the songs have their musical competence complimented "eclectic, energetic and full of attitude", but the review contrasts them with stodgy performance elsewhere. Several songs come in for particular criticism lyrically as standard dance culture, not up to prior music by Armand.

== Track listing ==
No.	Title	Writer(s)	Length
1.	"Killing Puritans"	Armand Van Helden	2:06
2.	"Little Black Spiders" (featuring Fiona Marr)	Armand Van Helden, Klaus Meine, Herman Harebell, Rudolph Schenker	8:15
3.	"Breakdancers Call"	Armand Van Helden	6:21
4.	"House Boxing" (featuring Lord Sear)	Armand Van Helden	2:05
5.	"Full Moon" (featuring Common)	Armand Van Helden, Lonnie Lynn, James Bedford	4:19
6.	"Koochy"	Armand Van Helden, Gary Numan	8:07
7.	"Watch Your Back" (featuring Herbie Hancock and N'Dea Davenport)	Bill Summers, Paul Jackson, Mike Clark, Bennie Mauphin, N'Dea Davenport, Trevant Hardson	8:23
8.	"Hybridz" (featuring The Mongoloids)	Armand Van Helden, E. Sanchez, Michael Smith	10:01
9.	"Flyaway Love"	Armand Van Helden	9:08
10.	"Swamp Thang"	Armand Van Helden	5:49
11.	"Conscience" (featuring Tekitha)	Armand Van Helden, Tekitha Washington	9:07

== Charts ==
Chart (2000)	Peak position
Australian Albums (ARIA)	170
Belgian Albums Chart	49
UK Albums Chart	38

== Release history ==
Country	Release date	Format	Label	Catalogue
Australia	May 29, 2000	CD	London	8573833195
United States	October 1, 2005	CD		
