= You Don't Know =

You Don't Know may refer to:

- "You Don't Know" (702 song), 1999
- "You Don't Know" (Berlin song), 1986
- "You Don't Know" (Cyndi Lauper song), 1997
- "You Don't Know" (Helen Shapiro song), 1961
- "You Don't Know" (Kierra Sheard song), 2004
- "You Don't Know" (Eminem song), featuring 50 Cent, Lloyd Banks, and Cashis, 2006
- "You Don't Know" (Scarlett & Black song), a US top 20 hit for Scarlett & Black in 1987
- "You Don't Know" (Smoove & Turrell song), 2009
- "You Don't Know", a song by Big Sean from Hall of Fame, 2013
- "You Don't Know", a song by KC and the Sunshine Band from Do It Good, 1974
- "You Don't Know", a song by Milow, 2006
- "You Don't Know", a song by Missy Elliott from Da Real World, 1999
- "You Don't Know", a song by Scarlett and Black, 1986
- "You Don't Know", a song by Westlife from World of Our Own, 2001
- "You Don't Know", a song from the musical Next to Normal, 2008
- You Don't Know, a sampler album issued by Ninja Tune, 2008
