= My My My (Armand Van Helden song) =

2004 single by Armand van Helden

- 2004 cover art

Single by Armand van Helden

from the album Nympho
- Released: August 30, 2004
- Length: 6:20 (original); 3:06 (radio edit)
- Label: Southern Fried
- Songwriters: Barry Mann, Cynthia Weil, Armand van Helden, Gary Wright, Andreas S. Jensen, Joe Killington
- Producer: Armand van Helden

Armand van Helden singles chronology
"Hear My Name" (2004)	"My My My" (2004)	"Into Your Eyes" (2005)

Alternative covers
- Cover art for the 2006 version featuring Tara McDonald

Tara McDonald single singles chronology
"MyMyMy" (2006)	"Delirious" (2008)

"My My My" is a song by American producer and DJ Armand van Helden. The song contains a sample of the song "Comin' Apart" by Gary Wright from the 1981 studio album The Right Place. The track was produced in 2004 and included on the album Nympho. When released as a single, it became a top-10 success in Australia, Flemish Belgium, Denmark and Norway, while reaching number 15 on the UK Singles Chart.

An alternative version of "My My My", stylized as "MyMyMy" and featuring vocals from Tara McDonald, was released in 2006 and peaked at number 12 in the United Kingdom, three places above the original. It was also more successful than the original in Ireland, reaching number 25 compared to the original's peak of number 36.

== Music video ==
The music video features a dream sequence of a geeky man (Beeny Royston), who is sunbathing on the beach wearing a raincoat and orange speedos. He spots a young woman in her bikini in a beach house behind him, and she invites him into the house, into an all-girls' party. At the end of the video the viewer finds out that he was daydreaming and that when he appeared to be kissing a girl he was actually kissing his dog.

== Charts ==
=== Weekly charts ===
Chart (2004–2005)	Peak position
Australia (ARIA)	6
Australian Club Chart (ARIA)	1
Australian Dance (ARIA)	2
Belgium (Ultratop 50 Flanders)	5
Belgium (Ultratip Bubbling Under Wallonia)	6
Denmark (Tracklisten)	5
Hungary (Dance Top 40)	1
Ireland (IRMA)	36
Ireland Dance (IRMA)	4
Netherlands (Dutch Top 40)	14
Netherlands (Single Top 100)	18
Norway (VG-lista)	9
Scottish Singles Sales (Official Charts)	26
UK Singles (Official Charts)	15
UK Dance (Official Charts)	1
UK Independent (Official Charts)	1
US Dance Club Songs (Billboard)	2
US Dance Singles Sales (Billboard)	3
US Dance Airplay (Billboard)	19

Chart (2006)	Peak position
Hungary (Single Top 40)	4
Ireland (IRMA)	25
Scottish Singles Sales (Official Charts)	16
UK Singles (Official Charts)	12
UK Dance (Official Charts)	1
UK Independent (Official Charts)	1

=== Year-end charts ===
Chart (2004)	Position
Australian Club Chart (ARIA)	4
Australian Dance (ARIA)	11
Belgium (Ultratop 50 Flanders)	51
Netherlands (Dutch Top 40)	65
UK Singles (OCC)	166

Chart (2005)	Position
US Dance Club Play (Billboard)	11

Chart (2006)	Position
UK Singles (OCC)	100

== Certifications ==
Region	Certification	Certified units/sales
Australia (ARIA)	Gold	35,000^{^}
New Zealand (RMNZ)	Platinum	30,000^{‡}
United Kingdom (BPI)	Platinum	600,000^{‡}
^{^} Shipments figures based on certification alone.^{‡} Sales+streaming figures based on certification alone.

== Release history ==
Region	Version	Date	Format	Label	Catalog	Ref.
United Kingdom	Original	August 30, 2004	12-inch single	Southern Fried	ECB67	
United Kingdom	Original	August 30, 2004	12-inch single	Southern Fried	ECB67R	
United Kingdom	Original	August 30, 2004	CD single	Southern Fried	ECB67CDS	
Australia	Original	October 25, 2004	CD single	Southern Fried	675163.5	
Germany	Original	September 6, 2004	12-inch single	Southern Fried	B0002FE2SY	
United Kingdom	Remix	June 11, 2006	Digital download	Southern Fried	—N/a	
United Kingdom	Remix	June 12, 2006	CD single	Southern Fried	ECB97CDS	
United Kingdom	Remix	June 12, 2006	12-inch single	Southern Fried	ECB97	
