= The 2 Bears =

British musical duo

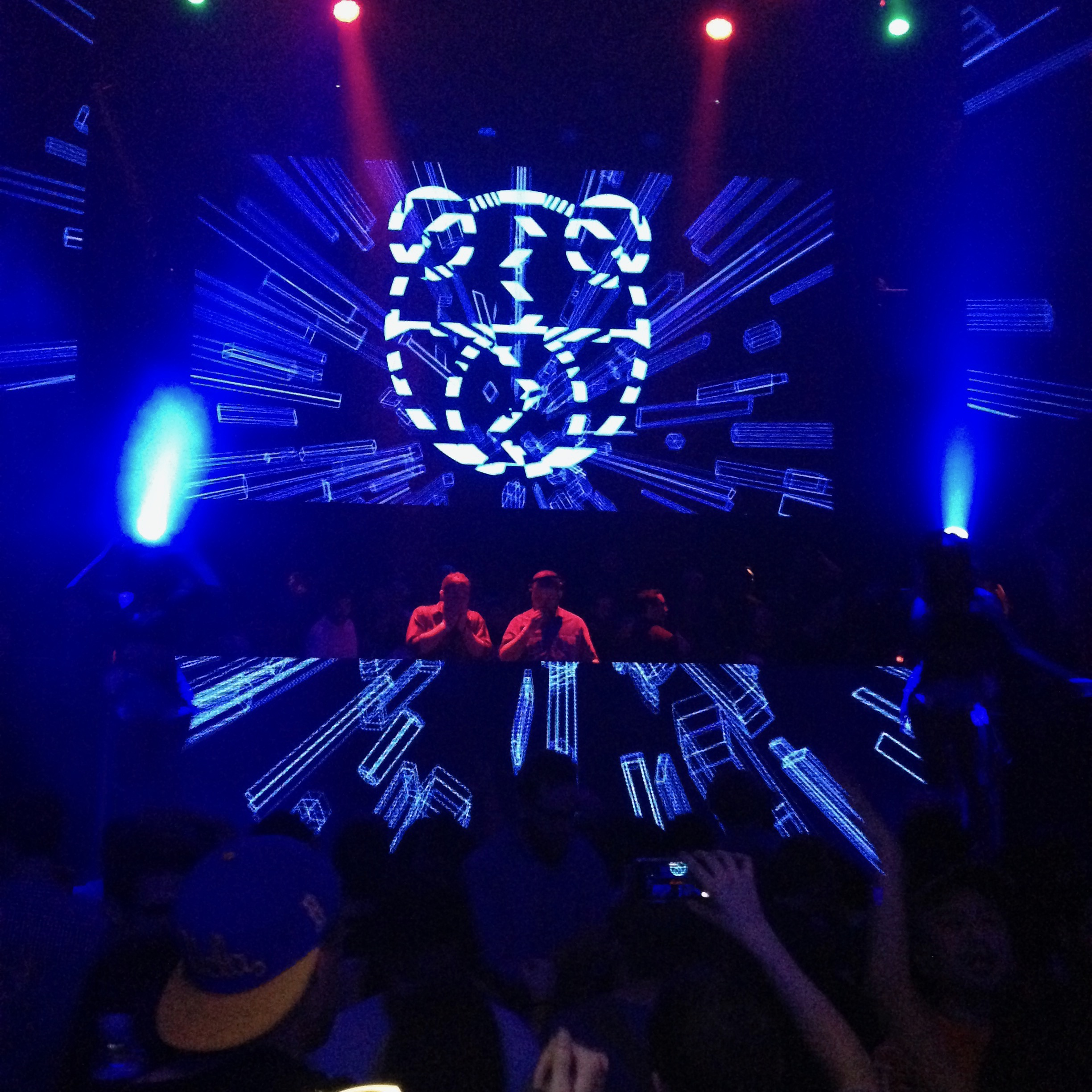
- The duo performing, with their logo projected above

Background information
- Origin: London, United Kingdom
- Genres: Indietronica; house; alternative dance
- Years active: 2009–present
- Labels: Southern Fried; DFA
- Members: Joe Goddard; Raf Rundell

The 2 Bears are a British musical duo formed in 2009, composed of Joe Goddard (of electronic band Hot Chip) and Raf Rundell (previously of 1965 Records). The duo produces original material amalgamating various styles, including 2-step, house, and soul, and also hosts a radio show on Ministry of Sound Radio entitled Follow the Bears. Critics offer various descriptions of The 2 Bears' sound, including "pop-hip-house", "liquid-bmore-house-step" and "rave-garage". The duo has produced remixes for several established artists including Santigold, Metronomy, Toddla T and the View.

== History ==
Raf Rundell, a former press officer, and Joe Goddard, one-fifth of electronic music band Hot Chip, met while working together at the Greco-Roman soundsystem parties. Joe has told how the band originated from the suggestion of a friend who proposed that he, Rundell, and Joe Mount (from the band Metronomy) form a band called 'The 3 Bears'. The band ultimately formed as a two-piece without Joe Mount.

During their formative studio sessions Rundell and Goddard created the tracks "Mercy Time" and "Be Strong", which went on to appear on their first EP Follow The Bears, released by Southern Fried Records in early 2010. Follow The Bears was supported by a subsequent remix EP featuring contributions from Derrick Carter and Supabeatz. The 2 Bears went on to release a further two EPs on Southern Fried Records, Curious Nature EP in the latter part of 2010 and Bearhug EP in early 2011. Both were accompanied by further remix EPs with contributors including Maxxi Soundsystem and Midland.

The 2 Bears' first complete album Be Strong was released on 29 January 2012 and was preceded by the single "Work" on 2 January. The single was included on the XFM playlist. They also made a mix album, 2 Bears 1 Love which featured Wiley, Toddla T, and remixes from the 2 Bears. Their second LP titled The Night Is Young was released in October 2014 on Southern Fried Records.

== Discography ==
=== Albums ===
Title	Album details	Peak chart positions	
Title	Album details	UK	AUS
Be Strong	Released: 30 January 2012; Label: Southern Fried; Formats: CD, vinyl, digital download	35	83
The Night Is Young	Released: September 2014; Label: Southern Fried; Formats: Digital download	53	—

=== Remix albums ===
Title	Album details
The Night Is Young (remixed)	Released: 6 November 2015; Label: Southern Fried; Formats: CD, vinyl, digital download
Bears in Space	Released: 11 May 2015; Label: Southern Fried; Formats: CD, vinyl, digital download

=== Extended plays ===
Title	EP details
Follow the Bears EP	Released: 2010; Label: Southern Fried; Formats: Vinyl, digital download
Curious Nature EP	Released: 2010; Label: Southern Fried; Formats: Vinyl, digital download
Bear Hug EP	Released: 2011; Label: Southern Fried; Formats: Vinyl, digital download
Lambs Bread and Weepers EP	Released: 2014; Label: Southern Fried; Formats: Digital download
Nowadays EP	Released: 2025; Label: Ursounds; Formats: Digital download

=== Singles ===
Year	Single	Peak chart positions			Album
Year	Single	UK	UK Dance	UK Indie	Album
2011	"Bear Hug"	187	26	13	Be Strong
2012	"Work"	— (Note: "Work" did not enter the UK Singles Chart, but peaked at number 47 on the UK Physical Singles Chart Top 100.)	—	—	Be Strong
2014	"Angel (Touch Me)"	—	—	—	The Night Is Young
2014	"Not This Time"	—	—	—	The Night Is Young
