= Spalding Rockwell =

American band

- Genres: Punk, electro, pop
- Years active: 2002-2005
- Labels: Defend
- Members: Mary Louise Platt; Nicole Lombardi
- Website: Official Spalding Rockwell website Nicole Lombardi from Spalding Rockwell's Official website

Spalding Rockwell is a band composed of Mary Louise Platt "ML" and Nicole Lombardi "Nikki". They are known for their collaboration with Armand Van Helden entitled "Hear My Name" and are featured in the music video. They are also known for their critically acclaimed record entitled KATE. "Hear My Name" reached number 7 on the Billboard dance chart, was top 30 on world and internet charts, made number 34 in the UK Singles Chart, and reached number 32 in the Australian Singles Chart. "Hear My Name" was also made a into a music video featuring Mary Louise Platt and Nicole Lombardi (Spalding Rockwell) that was a MTV Europe hit. Spalding Rockwell is self-described as being "equal parts punk, electro and pop.

== Biography ==
This group originally appeared in New York City as a punk-hybrid collective composed of Mike Linn (drums), Cezhan Ambrose (guitar), Joe Fiorentino (guitar), Nicole Lombardi (vocals, bass), and ML Platt (vocals). The group was eventually renamed "Daughter" after Platt and Lombardi continued on as the duo "Spalding Rockwell". ML Platt grew up in New York City. ML was primarily influenced by hip hop, especially Black Sheep, Cypress Hill and Wu-Tang Clan. Later she was inspired by the likes of Jimi Hendrix. Nicole Lombardi grew up in Washington, D.C. Nicole was influenced by the city's music and arts communities, frequently attending live performances at local venues including the 9:30 Club, and Tracks. The duo originally met in high school. Spalding Rockwell first gained attention as a featured act on Larry Tee’s electroclash circuit. Their full-length LP Kate distributed by Defend Music in 2004 was entirely written, performed, produced, and sound engineered by ML and Nicole in their New York recording studio. Most successful were their hit single collaborations with Armand Van Helden, "Hear My Name" which appeared on Van Helden's record "New York: A Mix Odyssey" in 2004 (released by Sony Southern Fried Records) and "Jenny" in 2005 (released by Ultra Records).

== Discography ==
=== Albums ===
- Skin (as Daughter) (2003)
- Kate (2004)

=== Singles/EPs ===
- "Hear My Name" (2004) (with Armand Van Helden)
- "Je T'Appelle / Hear My Name" (2004) (with Armand Van Helden)
- "The Kate Remixes" (2005)
- "Jenny" (2005) (with Armand Van Helden)
