= You Don't Know Me (Armand van Helden song) =

1999 single by Armand van Helden

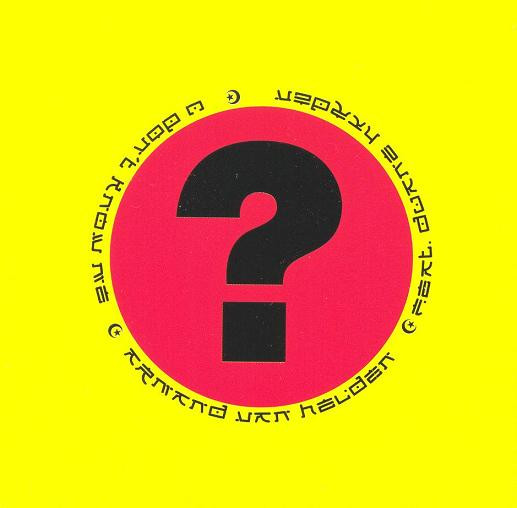

Single by Armand van Helden featuring Duane Harden

from the album 2 Future 4 U
- B-side: "Alienz"; "Rock da Spot"
- Released: January 25, 1999
- Genre: House; garage
- Length: 8:10 (original version); 3:59 (radio edit)
- Label: Armed
- Songwriters: Duane Harden; Armand van Helden; Kossi Gardner
- Producer: Armand van Helden

Armand van Helden singles chronology
"Ultrafunkula" (1997)	"You Don't Know Me" (1999)	"Flowerz" (1999)

Audio sample
- "U Don't Know Me": file; help

"You Don't Know Me" (originally titled "U Don't Know Me") is a song by American record producer Armand van Helden featuring vocals from American singer Duane Harden. It was released on January 25, 1999, as the lead single from Helden's third studio album, 2 Future 4 U (1998). The creation of the song came about when Helden created a looping track composed of several music samples and left Harden to write and record the lyrics alone.

The song peaked at number two on the US Billboard Dance Club Play chart and reached number one on the UK Singles Chart in February 1999. "You Don't Know Me" additionally reached the top 10 in France, Greece, and Italy and topped the Canadian RPM Dance chart.

== Background ==
In a 2023 interview, vocalist Duane Harden explained that he was working as a computer engineer at UPS in New York when he was first approached to collaborate with Armand van Helden. Harden recalled that van Helden played him several loops, and he was immediately drawn to the string sample from Carrie Lucas’s “Dance with You.” Van Helden gave Harden strict instructions that the lyrics should not focus on romance, which shaped the conversational, confrontational tone of the finished vocal. Harden wrote the lyrics in roughly fifteen minutes late at night, before recording them directly over the instrumental track that van Helden had left for him.

== Content ==
The strings featured in this song are courtesy of Carrie Lucas's "Dance with You", also used in Phats and Small's "Music for Pushchairs". The drums are sampled from Jaydee's "Plastic Dreams". The full version of the track features a dialogue from the Dial M for Monkey segment of Cartoon Network's Dexter's Laboratory. The episode was "Simion", where the title character (voiced by Maurice LaMarche) provided the spoken intro.

== Critical reception ==
NME praised it as “a classic slice of New York house given a glossy edge,” highlighting Harden’s vocal as crucial to its crossover appeal. Billboard magazine described the track as “a seductive, string-driven house cut” and singled it out as one of van Helden’s most accessible productions to date.

== Legacy ==
In 2014, English DJ and music producer Duke Dumont ranked "U Don't Know Me" number 10 in his list of "The 10 Best UK Number One Singles", saying, "I remember seeing this on Top Of The Pops, and, alongside songs like Daft Punk's 'Da Funk', it stuck out from the dross of the manufactured acts that were in abundance. Duane Harden's vocal over the instrumental is the element that makes this song." In 2016, Vice magazine ranked the song number eight in their list of "The Ten Best Samples in the History of House Music". In 2025, Billboard ranked it number 13 in their list of "The 50 Best House Songs of All Time".

== Track listings ==
- US maxi-CD single
1. "U Don't Know Me" (original mix)
2. "Alienz"
3. "Rock da Spot" (featuring Mr. Len)
4. "U Don't Know Me" (dubstrumental)
5. "U Don't Know Me" (radio edit)
- Canadian maxi-CD single
1. "U Don't Know Me" (radio edit)
2. "Alienz"
3. "Rock da Spot" (featuring Mr. Len)
4. "U Don't Know Me" (dubstrumental)
5. "U Don't Know Me" (original mix)
- US 12-inch single

A. "You Don't Know Me"
B. "You Don't Know Me" (Raw mix)

- UK CD and cassette single, Australasian CD single
1. "You Don't Know Me" (radio edit) – 3:59
2. "You Don't Know Me" – 8:10
3. "Rock da Spot" (featuring Mr. Len) – 5:50
- UK 12-inch single and European CD single
1. "You Don't Know Me" – 8:10
2. "Rock da Spot" (featuring Mr. Len) – 5:50

== Charts ==
=== Weekly charts ===
Chart (1999)	Peak position
Australia (ARIA)	15
Belgium (Ultratop 50 Flanders)	13
Belgium (Ultratop 50 Wallonia)	26
Belgium Dance (Ultratop Flanders)	2
Canada (Nielsen SoundScan)	11
Canada Dance/Urban (RPM)	1
Denmark (IFPI)	17
Europe (Eurochart Hot 100)	6
France (SNEP)	7
Germany (GfK)	40
Greece (IFPI)	2
Iceland (Íslenski Listinn Topp 40)	26
Ireland (IRMA)	11
Italy (Musica e dischi)	7
Netherlands (Dutch Top 40)	11
Netherlands (Single Top 100)	14
New Zealand (Recorded Music NZ)	15
Scottish Singles Sales (Official Charts)	2
Spain (Promusicae)	18
Sweden (Sverigetopplistan)	27
Switzerland (Schweizer Hitparade)	16
UK Singles (Official Charts)	1
UK Dance (Official Charts)	1
US Dance Club Songs (Billboard)	2

Chart (2020)	Peak position
Hungary (Dance Top 40)	7

=== Year-end charts ===
Chart (1999)	Position
Australia (ARIA)	80
Belgium (Ultratop 50 Flanders)	84
Belgium (Ultratop 50 Wallonia)	90
Canada Dance/Urban (RPM)	8
France (SNEP)	37
Netherlands (Dutch Top 40)	111
UK Singles (OCC)	44
UK Airplay Top 50 (Music Week)	27
US Dance Club Play (Billboard)	10

Chart (2020)	Position
Hungary (Dance Top 40)	32

Chart (2021)	Position
Hungary (Dance Top 40)	41

== Certifications ==
Region	Certification	Certified units/sales
Australia (ARIA)	Gold	35,000^{^}
New Zealand (RMNZ)	Gold	15,000^{‡}
United Kingdom (BPI)	Platinum	600,000^{‡}
United Kingdom (BPI) "U Don't Know Me"	Silver	200,000^{‡}
^{^} Shipments figures based on certification alone.^{‡} Sales+streaming figures based on certification alone.
