= Armand van Helden =

American DJ (born 1970)

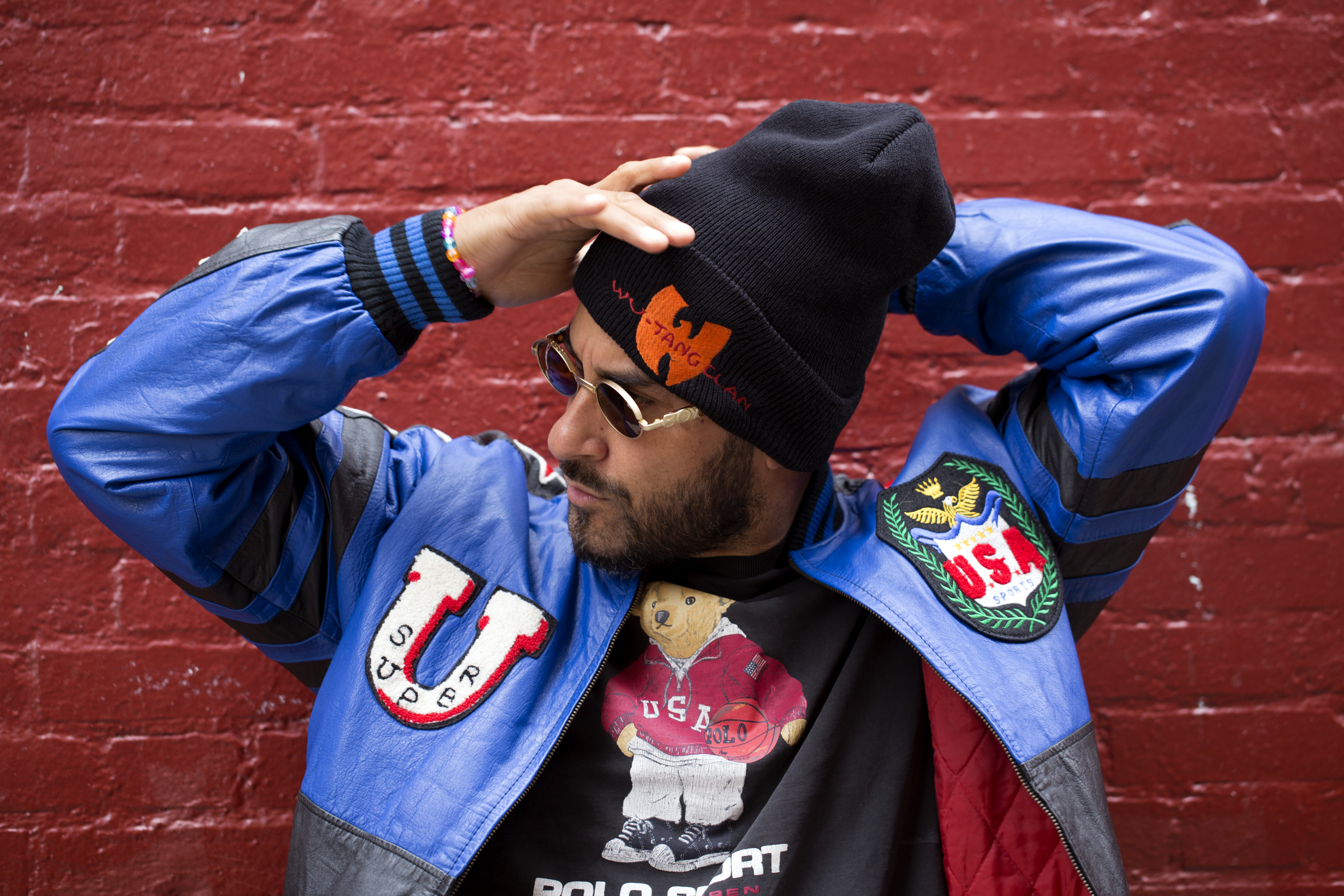
- Armand van Helden in 2013

Background information
- Also known as: Deep Creed; Sultans of Swing; Banji Boys; Circle Children; Old School Junkies; Jungle Juice; Armand & The Banana Spliffs; Hardhead; Wizzards of Wax; The Mole People; Chupacabra; Duck Sauce
- Born: February 16, 1970 (age 56)
- Origin: Boston, Massachusetts, U.S.
- Genres: Electronic; house; nu-disco; hip hop; speed garage; garage house; big beat; breakbeat
- Occupations: DJ; record producer; remixer; songwriter
- Works: Armand van Helden discography
- Years active: 1990–present
- Labels: AV8 (1992–1996); Nervous (1992–1999); Strictly Rhythm (1993–1997); ZYX (1993–2002); Henry Street (1994–1996); FFRR (1994–2001); Armed (1999–2004); Southern Fried (2004–present)
- Member of: Duck Sauce
- Website: armandvanhelden.com

Armand van Helden (Dutch pronunciation: [vɑn ˈɦɛldən]; born February 16, 1970) is an American DJ, record producer, remixer and songwriter from Boston, Massachusetts. His career has spanned beyond three decades.

Van Helden's singles include "You Don't Know Me", "I Want Your Soul", "My My My" featuring Tara McDonald, and "Bonkers" featuring Dizzee Rascal, all of which became No. 1 on the UK Dance Chart and reached No. 2 on the Billboard Dance Chart.

In 2009 Van Helden formed the DJ duo Duck Sauce with Canadian DJ A-Trak, receiving a nomination at the 54th Grammy Awards for Best Dance Recording for their song "Barbra Streisand", which topped the charts in 12 countries. The duo also released the singles "Anyway", which reached No. 1 on the UK Dance Chart, "Big Bad Wolf" and "NRG".

Though much of his chart success has been in Europe, particularly in the United Kingdom, Van Helden has been linked to the electronic music scene of New York since the early to mid- 1990s. He was nominated for a Grammy Award for Best Remixed Recording in 1998. Van Helden often remixes and uses samples of funk, soul, R&B and hip hop. He also uses filters and dub progressions, as in NYC beat, dancehall and reggae samples. Among his remixes are the songs "Spin Spin Sugar" by Sneaker Pimps, "The Bomb! (These Sounds Fall into My Mind)" by The Bucketheads, "Sugar Is Sweeter" by C. J. Bolland and "Professional Widow" by Tori Amos.

Van Helden was a pioneer of the speed garage genre and has continued remixing various artists such as Katy Perry, Van Halen, Daft Punk, Pharrell Williams, Britney Spears, Enrique Iglesias, David Guetta, Sam Smith, Bloc Party, Janet Jackson, Juliet Roberts and KRS-One in this genre. Releases include the singles "I Need a Painkiller" and "Wings" produced in 2018 and 2016 respectively.

== Early life ==
Van Helden was born in 1970 to an Indonesian-Dutch father and a French mother of Lebanese descent. He moved around the world as a child, spending time in the Netherlands, Latvia, Turkey, and Italy because his father was a member of the U.S. Air Force. At the age of 13, he got his first DJ gig at a Valentine's Day dance and around the same time, he bought a drum machine.

== Career ==
From circa 1986–1988, Van Helden was in a rap group, named Define because they considered themselves "de finest around" and accordingly "defined" rap music. His name was DJ AVH, and fellow crew members were Sir Beat and Lopoka. They performed across Europe and helped hone his DJ skills.

Van Helden returned to Boston in 1988, moonlighting as a DJ in Boston clubs. He attended college in Boston. He quit his legal-review job in 1991 to work as a remixer under the management of Neil Petricone and X-Mix. He took up a DJ residency at the Loft, a top Boston nightclub at the time. He released his first official single, a mix of Deep Creed's "Stay On My Mind" through Nervous Records.

Van Helden released "Move It To the Left" (credited to Sultans of Swing) in 1992 on the Strictly Rhythm label, which became a moderate club hit and led to a string of singles released under several monikers for that label. His first track to make the Billboard Hot Dance Music/Club Play chart was "Witch Doktor", which made the top 5 in 1994, and led to opportunities to remix New Order, Deep Forest, Jimmy Somerville, Deee-Lite, and Faithless.

However, it was the "Professional Widow" remix that established Van Helden and became a dance hit around the world and as a number-one hit in the United Kingdom. Van Helden stated of his compensation for the remix: "it was like $10,000, and that was a little below what I was making back then for a remix, but I had the time." However, it led to work remixing the Rolling Stones, Janet Jackson, Katy Perry, Britney Spears, Puff Daddy, Daft Punk and Sneaker Pimps, adding to his reputation as one of the world's top house-music musicians.

In 1996, Van Helden collaborated with Thomas Bangalter of Daft Punk and Junior Sanchez as Da Mongoloids, releasing "Spark da Meth" on the Strictly Rhythm label. A year later Van Helden's track "Ten Minutes of Funk" was featured on the Daft Punk live album Alive 1997.

"Cha Cha" was another top-ten dance hit from Van Helden's first album, Old School Junkies: The Album, which was released in 1996, along with "The Funk Phenomena". A greatest hits album appeared the next year, followed by a breakbeat album later in 1997. "You Don't Know Me" was a number two hit on the Billboard dance chart, a number one hit in the United Kingdom, and a top 20 single on the pop charts in Australia and Canada. The song was the breakout track from his 2Future4U album, which was released stateside on Armand's own label, Armed Records.

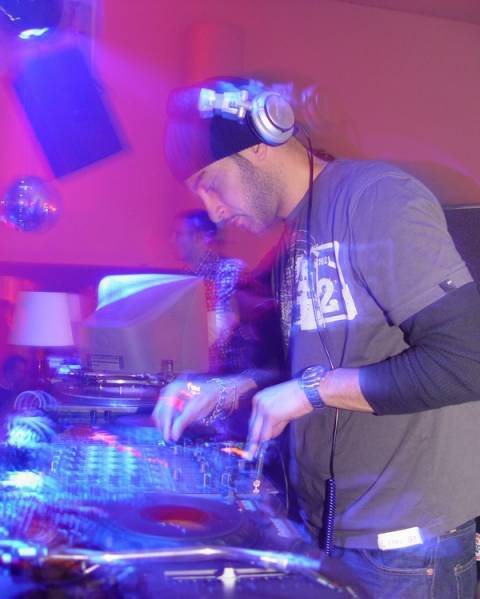
Armand van Helden in 2004

Van Helden released the Killing Puritans album in 2000 (also on Armed Records), which contained the hit "Koochy". The track was based around Gary Numan's five times UK chart hit, "Cars". His single "Why Can't You Free Some Time" made it to number 34 in the UK in 2001. His New York: A Mix Odyssey album released in March 2004 produced two hits: "Hear My Name", a collaboration with Spalding Rockwell that reached number 7 on the Billboard dance chart, number 34 in the UK, and the top 40 in Australia; and "My My My" featuring Tara McDonald, which reached number 4 on the world internet charts, number 5 in the Belgian and Dutch charts, number 6 in Australia, number 15 in the UK, and top 30 in the world dance charts. In April 2004, he provided a mix for BBC Radio 1's Essential Mix show.

In 2005, Van Helden released the album Nympho, featuring the singles "Into Your Eyes", "My My My", "Hear My Name", and "When the Lights Go Down". The album reached the top 30 in Australia, and number 48 in the UK. "When The Lights Go Down" reached No. 52 on the ARIA Charts in Australia, and was a dance and club hit.

Van Helden was the featured DJ in the Southern Fried tent at Get Loaded in the Park at Clapham Common on the August Bank Holiday in 2005.

In 2006, Van Helden re-released "My My My" featuring the British singer Tara McDonald, which reached number 12 on the UK Singles Chart and number 1 in the UK dance charts. Remixes included the Funktuary radio edit and Stonebridge remix. In 2007, Van Helden released his new album, Ghettoblaster, from which he released the singles "NYC Beat," which reached number 22 on the UK chart, and "I Want Your Soul," which reached number 19. In 2008, Van Helden gained more commercial success by remixing "INSPIRE", a No. 1 hit by the Japanese pop star Ayumi Hamasaki. This remix was released on the album Ayu-mi-x 6: Gold. Also in 2008, Van Helden released two albums, You Don't Know Me: The Best of Armand Van Helden and a mix album titled New York: a Mix Odyssey 2. When discussing this mix in a 2009 interview with 5mag.net, Armand said, "I just went back to hip-hop. I put my head where I used to be when I was 19. It was a blast making it. Hip-house was just so great."

In May 2009, Van Helden collaborated with British rapper Dizzee Rascal on his single "Bonkers". It peaked at number one in the United Kingdom, where it stayed for two weeks and became Van Helden's third chart-topper in Britain. Later in 2009, Van Helden worked with A-Trak to create "aNYway" which was released in October under the name Duck Sauce. The duo later gained chart success with the song "Barbra Streisand", which peaked at number three in the United Kingdom and within the top ten of the charts in other European markets.

Van Helden teamed up with American DJ/producer Steve Aoki in 2011 to produce the song "Brrrat!", which featured on Godskitchen's album. In early 2011, Van Helden stated that he had planned an album for 2014.

Van Helden teamed up with fellow DJ/producer A-Trak in 2011 to form Duck Sauce. The duo scored hits with "Barbra Streisand" and "The Big Bad Wolf". In 2013, Duck Sauce released the song "It's You", a hit on the dancefloor throughout the world, and has been nominated for the MTV Video Awards. In October of the same year, they presented two new songs, "Stereo Radio" with Duck Sauce and "I Know A Place" (featuring Spank Rock). In 2014, Van Helden collaborated with Cheap Thrills label boss and DJ Hervé to release their recent song "Power of Bass" Duck Sauce, released their debut album, Quack, released on April 15 through Fool's Gold Records. The album features the duo's long chain of singles. The new Duck Sauce video for "NRG" is filmed as an infomercial.

In August 2014, Sam Smith's "I'm Not the Only One" featured a remix by Van Helden. In September 2014, Van Helden remixed for Jungle 70 and Majestic with Creeping In The Dark.

In April 2015, London-based Snakehips released Forever Pt. II EP, which spurred a series of well-received remixes, including a Duck Sauce remix of their song "Forever".

Van Helden returned in March 2020 with a new song, "Give Me Your Loving" with Lorne.

== Personal life ==
Van Helden married Brittney Landstrom (aka Brittles) in May 2024.

== Discography ==
Studio albums

- Old School Junkies: The Album (1996)
- Sampleslaya: Enter the Meatmarket (1997)
- 2 Future 4 U (1998)
- Killing Puritans (2000)
- Gandhi Khan (2002)
- Nympho (2005)
- Ghettoblaster (2007)
- Extra Dimensional (2016)

== Awards and nominations ==
=== International Dance Music Awards ===
Year	Nominee / work	Award	Result
1998	Armand Van Helden	Best Remixer	Won
2005	My My My	Best House/Garage Track	Nominated
2011	Brrrat! w/Steve Aoki	Best Underground House Track	Nominated
2011	Brrrat! w/Steve Aoki	Best Electro Tech/House Track	Nominated
2011	"Barbra Streisand"	Best Break-Through Artist	Nominated
2011	"Barbra Streisand"	Best Best House/Garage Track	Won
2011	"Barbra Streisand"	Best Underground Dance Track	Won
2012	"Big Bad Wolf"	Best Underground Dance Track	Won
2012	"Big Bad Wolf"	Best Music Video	Nominated
2012	"Big Bad Wolf"	Best Artist - Group	Nominated
2015	NRG	Best Dubstep/Drum & Bass Track	Won

=== Grammy Awards ===
Year	Nominee / work	Award	Result
1998	Armand Van Helden	Grammy Award for Best Remixed Recording, Non-Classical	Nominated
2012	"Barbra Streisand"	Best Dance Recording	Nominated

=== MTV Video Music Awards ===
Year	Nominee / work	Award	Result
2012	"Big Bad Wolf"	Best Electronic Dance Music Video	Nominated
2012	"Big Bad Wolf"	Best Direction	Nominated
2013	"It's You"	Best Visual Effects	Nominated

=== UK Music Video Awards ===
Year	Nominee / work	Award	Result
2011	"Barbra Streisand"	Best Dance Video - International	Won
2012	"Big Bad Wolf"	Best Dance Video - International	Won
2012	"Big Bad Wolf"	Best Art Direction	Nominated
2012	"Big Bad Wolf"	Best VFX	Nominated

== DJ Magazine Top 100 DJs ==
Year	Peak position	Notes	Ref.
1997	23	New Entry	
1998	96	Down 73	
1999	32	Up 64	
2000	79	Down 47	
2001	77	Up 2	
Hiatus
2004	84	Re Entry	
2005	61	Up 23	
2006	138	Exit (Down 77)	
2007	86	Re Entry (Up 52)	
2008	119	Exit (Down 33)	
2009	103	Out (Up 16)	
2010	180	Out (Down 77)	
