= Southern Fried Records =

- Founded: 1994
- Founder: Norman Cook
- Distributors: Believe Music; The Orchard; ST2 Music
- Genre: House, electro, breaks, techno, indie, dance
- Country of origin: England
- Location: London
- Official website: southernfriedrecords.com

Southern Fried Records is a London-based independent electronic dance music record label founded and owned by Norman Cook, better known by his stage name, Fatboy Slim. The label was created by Cook in 1994 to publish and market his and other artists' releases that major labels would deem not commercial enough for mass release.

The label's roster has featured scene leaders such as Cook himself (often under his Mighty Dub Katz pseudonym, among others), as well as electro funk pioneer Kurtis Mantronik. Currently, the label has expanded its range of releases to include more album-based artists alongside club music producers, including Callum McDonald, Armand Van Helden, DJ Touche, Cagedbaby, The Black Ghosts, The Whip, Crookers, The Shoes, The 2 Bears, Kashii, Music for the Deaf and The BPA (a.k.a. The Brighton Port Authority).

Cook's first release on the label was Live on Brighton Beach.

== See also ==
- List of record labels
- List of independent UK record labels
