= 1999 in British music charts =

This is a summary of 1999 in music in the United Kingdom, including the official charts from that year.

== Summary ==
The most successful album, Come on Over by Shania Twain, spent a cumulative total of ten weeks at the top, followed by Boyzone's By Request with nine weeks in total.

In the singles chart Ricky Martin's "Livin' La Vida Loca", Eiffel 65's "Blue (Da Ba Dee)" and Cliff Richard's "The Millennium Prayer" all topped the singles charts for three weeks, the joint longest time at number one during 1999.

Teen pop singer Christina Aguilera made her debut with her hit single "Genie in a Bottle" which was #1 for 2 weeks in the UK and was one of the best selling singles of the year.

This year also saw the return of American Rock/New Wave band Blondie and their number one single "Maria". The teenage pop singer Britney Spears' "...Baby One More Time" was the highest selling single of the year.

One of the first number one singles of the year came from music producer, Fatboy Slim who topped the charts for one week with his single "Praise You". January became a very successful month for the DJ, real name Norman Cook, a former member of Hull-based band The Housemartins, his new album You've Come A Long Way Baby topped the charts for 4 weeks. The album produced many other hit singles, the follow-up to his chart topper "Right Here Right Now" peaking at number two, marking his third consecutive top three hit.

== Developments ==
=== Girl groups ===
1999 emphasised the trend away from girl groups, with solo acts and boy bands dominating the charts. B*Witched, with a fourth and final release from their début self-titled album, "Blame It On The Weatherman" became the first (and as of April 2011 only) girl group for their first four releases to début at #1; their success declined quickly thereafter. The Spice Girls, with four remaining members, reached number one with their first single without Geri Halliwell, claiming the official number one Christmas single at the end of 1998 with "Goodbye"; it was the group's third consecutive number one Christmas single. As for other girl groups, Cleopatra scored one Top 30 hit with "A Touch Of Love", peaking at number 24, Their T.V sitcom was a smash hit and was No1 in its time slot. Hepburn and the Thunderbugs, both girl bands who played their own instruments, had lesser success. Neither the Spice Girls nor All Saints, both popular in the previous year, released a single in 1999.

=== Boy bands ===
Boyzone topped the charts twice, first with a remake of a Billy Ocean song, "When the Going Gets Tough", made for Comic Relief and then with a remake of Canadian singer Anne Murray's hit "You Needed Me". Their album By Request, containing both chart-toppers along with the million-selling "No Matter What" from 1998, topped the albums chart for nine weeks and became the most successful album in their career. With six #1 singles to their name, they unofficially disbanded with both Ronan Keating and Stephen Gately going on to solo success. Keating reached #1 with his début single "When You Say Nothing At All" later in the year; it was featured in the soundtrack to the hit film Notting Hill.

5ive scored their first number one single with "Keep On Movin'" after numerous consecutive top ten hits. Their peak of popularity as a boy band was short-lived as many more successful groups eclipsed them. A1 were another British boy band who joined the music scene during the year, scoring three top ten singles, including "Be The First To Believe" and "Summertime Of Our Lives". Their album fared less well, only reaching number 20 on the charts.

American boy bands were also very successful in the UK during the course of the year, with *NSYNC scoring two top ten hits, though their album only made number 30. With seven consecutive top ten singles behind them, The Backstreet Boys made number one with "I Want It That Way". The song was taken from their album, Millennium which sold millions worldwide and made number two in the UK.

Despite these successes, all boy bands paled in comparison to Westlife, managed by Ronan Keating. Their first four singles ("Swear It Again", "If I Let You Go", "Flying Without Wings" and "I Have a Dream/Seasons in the Sun") all entered the charts at number one, equalling the record set by B*Witched earlier in the year. "Flying Without Wings" was voted The Record of the Year by the public in the annual ITV poll, and Westlife's début self-titled album reached number two in the charts.

=== From film to music ===
Two successful actresses launched successful singing careers. Jennifer Lopez, having scored a number one hit in the US with "If You Had My Love", had two top five hits in the UK. Martine McCutcheon, who left her role as Tiffany in the BBC soap opera EastEnders to begin singing topped the UK charts for two weeks with her second single "Perfect Moment". Her singing career was relatively short-lived and she soon returned to acting.

=== American successes ===
Many acts during the year managed to be successful in the UK, but did not manage to match the chart topper they had scored in the US. Mariah Carey clocked up her 14th number one single in the US, with "Heartbreaker", a collaboration with rapper Jay-Z, which made number five in the UK. Her newest album Rainbow could only make it to number eight in the UK and sold just 12 million copies worldwide – her lowest global count at the time. TLC topped the US charts twice during the year with "No Scrubs" and "Unpretty". They had their most successful year in the UK since 1995, and "No Scrubs" became their highest-peaking single making number three. R&B trio, Destiny's Child topped the US charts for the first time with "Bills, Bills, Bills". It made number six in the UK charts and set them on course for massive success in the new millennium. Enrique Iglesias also topped the US charts with his début single, "Bailamos", which made number four in Britain – he was to become much more successful in the UK in the new millennium.

White rapper, Eminem was very successful with his début in the UK; his début single "My Name Is" peaking at number two and his follow-up also hitting the top five. He was much more successful in the US, however his success grew in both countries and he quickly made a name for himself based on controversy through his lyrics and music videos. Southern Californian band, The Offspring are also not as successful in the US as they are in the UK, with their number one single being scored in January with "Pretty Fly (For A White Guy)". They followed it up with a number two hit and went on to great success around the world.

=== Movie soundtracks ===
Film music remained popular throughout the year. In addition to than Ronan Keating reaching number one with his song from Notting Hill, Madonna and Will Smith both reached number two with soundtrack singles: Madonna with "Beautiful Stranger" from Austin Powers: The Spy Who Shagged Me, and Will Smith with his US chart-topping single, "Wild Wild West", taken from the film of the same name. Another member of the cast of The Fresh Prince of Bel-Air, Tatyana Ali (who played Ashley Banks), reached number three with her second single "Boy You Knock Me Out", a follow-up to her debut "Daydreamin'", which had been number six the previous November. Her third single released in June fared less well, peaking at number 20. Will Smith also made number two in the UK with a follow-up release to "Wild Wild West": "Will 2K" became his last UK top three hit until 2003.

=== Latin and Europop ===
Two main crazes began in the UK during the year – the summer Latino craze and high demand for Europop and Eurodance. As a result, many acts in these styles of music received great success. Ricky Martin became an international star after releasing his massively successful single "Livin' La Vida Loca". Heading up the summer Latino craze in the UK and the US, he hit number one in several countries and topped the charts on both sides of the Atlantic. He became a phenomenon in the US; his début self-titled album even went on to appear in the Top 100 best selling albums of all time in the US. Lou Bega scored success with his only UK single "Mambo No.5". Still used in Cricket matches as their title song, it managed to hit #31 on import sales alone and topped the charts for two weeks when officially released in the UK.

The biggest success to come out of the Europop phenomenon was "Blue (Da Ba Dee)" by Eiffel 65. Topping the UK charts for three weeks, the song managed to sell a million copies and remained in the charts until 2000. It had also managed to make #39 on import sales. Their follow-up single "Move Your Body" made number three in 2000, saving them from one-hit-wonder status though some still consider them candidates. Dutch based multi-national dance act The Vengaboys followed up their 1998 number four début "Up and Down" with four consecutive top three singles, the first three of which made the Top 40 best-selling singles of the year list: "We Like To Party" (which hit number three early on in the year), "Boom, Boom, Boom, Boom!!" and "We're Going to Ibiza" (both one-week chart toppers for the group) and "Kiss (When The Sun Don't Shine)" (another number three hit for the group in December). Those songs filled European holiday discos throughout the year.

=== Novelty acts ===
Novelty acts found great success during 1999. Chef, a character from the popular animated television show, South Park hit number one in early January for one week with a special release "Chocolate Salty Balls". The voice on the track is the voice of Chef in the cartoon, Isaac Hayes, who had previously courted the UK singles chart way back in 1971 with "Theme from Shaft". Australian film director, Baz Luhrmann also scored a number one hit with a song explaining the way you should live life, passing on advice. "Everybody's Free (To Wear Sunscreen)". He was already massively successful as a director with films such as Strictly Ballroom and Romeo and Juliet. He was later to direct the hugely successful Moulin Rouge!. The song was based on "Desiderata", a number seven hit for Les Crane in 1972. Probably the most successful novelty act of the year was French act Quentin Dupieux, who under the name of Mr. Oizo scored a number one single, "Flat Beat". First featured in a television advert for Levi's Jeans, its wobbly bass riff catapulted it to the top of the charts for two weeks. The accompanying cuddly toy featured in the video also sold well.

=== Electronic music acts ===
Dance acts enjoyed great success on the singles chart during the year. In particular, a wave of Trance acts from Europe entering the Top 40 throughout the year, some of which initially entered the lower reaches of the Top 100 on import. Shaft hit number two with the Latin house remake "(Mucho Mambo) Sway". US producer Chris Brann created the dance track "King Of My Castle" under his moniker Wamdue Project. The remix version named "Roy Malone's King Edit" topped the UK charts for a week towards the end of the year. The two biggest production team hits came from Shanks & Bigfoot and ATB. Shanks & Bigfoot were British production duo Stephen Meade and Daniel Langsman who hit the top for two weeks with their release "Sweet Like Chocolate". Vocals on the track were provided by Sharon Woolf. ATB is German producer André Tanneberger, whose single "9pm (Till I Come)" hit number one for two weeks. It is widely regarded as the first trance track to reach the top spot in the UK. Both this and "Sweet Like Chocolate" were in the top ten best selling singles of the year. Alice Deejay also scored two top 5 hits with "Better Off Alone" and "Back In My Life". Mr Oizo, Armand Van Helden, Fatboy Slim, Vengaboys and Eiffel 65 all had chart toppers this year. Production number ones and Latin/Europop/Eurodance number ones showed the variety of countries chart-toppers were coming from during the year – Germany, France, America, Italy, The Netherlands, Ireland & Australia.

Basement Jaxx also enjoyed great success during this year. Only having charted once before in 1997, they scored two consecutive top five hits and one top 15 hit during the year. Their album release Remedy is also their highest peaking throughout their career, making #2.

Other successful acts were DJ Sakin & Friends, Chemical Brothers, Fatboy Slim, Artful Dodger, Chicane, Yomanda, Emmie, Wiseguys, Phats & Small, DJ Jean, Moloko, William Orbit, Ann Lee, amongst others.

=== Solo Spices ===
Ex-Spice Girl Mel B was Melanie G throughout the year, having been recently married; she reverted to her maiden name the following year. Her solo career was slowly dying out with her follow-up single to her 1998 chart topper making a mere number 14. The single, "Word Up" was a remake of Cameo's number three hit from 1986. Emma Bunton hit the charts for the first time, being featured on Tin Tin Out's single "What I Am". The single made number two and her success was only to grow from here.

Melanie C released her début solo single, "Goin' Down", which made number four and was the follow-up to her number three duet with Bryan Adams from the previous year. Her album, Northern Star made number four on the charts, and is the biggest selling solo album by a Spice Girl with over 3 million copies sold worldwide. The title track from the album also made number four later on in the year. She would experience greater success with her singles the following year.

Geri Halliwell was by far the most successful Spice Girl during the year. Having quit the group, the previous year, she announced she would be back. She came back to the music scene with a new image and a new sound. Her début single "Look at Me", only made number two, however she scored two chart toppers by the end of the year. "Mi Chico Latino" cashed in on the mood of the moment and hit the top for a week during the summer Latino craze of 1999. "Lift Me Up" became a second chart topper for the ex-Spice Girl and is perhaps Geri's strangest song, with an equally weird music video, in which she befriends a group of aliens and helps them fix their ship. Her début album, Schizophonic peaked at number four in the albums chart, and was well received in the UK and sold over two million copies worldwide.

=== BRIT awards ===
The BRIT Awards ceremony of 1999 was seen as the last one of the millennium, and a special song combining some of the hottest acts of the moment was released. B*Witched, Steps, Tina Cousins, Cleopatra and Billie joined forces to create "Thank ABBA For The Music", which reached number four in the charts, ending B*Witched's run of consecutive entries at the top. ABBA were at their peak of popularity again this year, despite not being around with the A-Teens, an ABBA tribute band making their mark on the UK charts with two top 20 hits, remakes of two previous #1 hits for the Swedish quartet, "Super Trouper" and "Mamma Mia".

The British artist whose success grew more than any other during the year (who was not a débuting act) was Robbie Williams. His second album, I've Been Expecting You returned to the top of the charts for one week and he also scored a second chart topping single with "She's The One". The single became strongly associated with the video in which Williams is a skating instructor of a man and woman, and has to replace the man in the competition after an injury. The chart-topper followed two number four hits, "Strong" and "No Regrets" which were all taken from his second album.

The Eurythmics won the BRIT Award for "Most Outstanding Contribution to British Music", giving Annie Lennox a ninth BRIT Award. Eurythmics re-united for the night, performing with Stevie Wonder, and announced they were re-uniting for a new studio album, Peace.

=== Female artists ===
Compiling the greatest songs of what had been a very successful decade in music for her was Celine Dion, with her chart topping greatest hits package All the Way... A Decade of Song. Whitney Houston had her most successful year on the singles chart since 1992. Following the success of her 1998 collaboration with Mariah Carey on "When You Believe", she scored a further three consecutive top five singles, each stalling a place higher than the previous; 4 to 3 to 2. "My Love Is Your Love" marked the first time she had been in the top two of the UK singles chart for over 6 years.

Britney Spears and Christina Aguilera both started their careers and released their début singles. In February Spears released her début single, "...Baby One More Time", which sold 1.45 million copies in the UK, becoming the second biggest-selling single by a female solo artist and also the fastest selling single by a female solo artist, with 0.46 million copies shifted in its first week of sale. Her début album of the same name was massively successful, and has sold over 25 million copies worldwide. It only managed to reach number four on the albums chart in the UK, but it did spawn two other top five hits during the year – the pop ballad "Sometimes" (number three) and the upbeat dance tune "(You Drive Me) Crazy" (number five). Christina Aguilera released her début single, "Genie in a Bottle" in October. Like "...Baby One More Time" it also spent two weeks at number one.

Macy Gray was one of the most successful female artists of the year. She kick-started her career in the UK with the long-running Top 10 hit, I Try, which entered the singles chart at #10 and eventually made its way up to #6. Her début, On How Life Is, found success both in the UK (#3) and the US (#4). In spite of her initial success, momentum swiftly tailed off and she has yet to enjoy another UK Top 10 hit.

Pop singer Shania Twain became an international sensation this year. She was back on the music scene with her third album, Come On Over. Her previous album, The Woman in Me had set various records for country albums and female artists, however Come On Over exceeded those records and became one of the biggest selling albums in the world ever. It spanned hits such as the orchestral "From This Moment On", the upbeat "Man! I Feel Like a Woman!", "That Don't Impress Me Much" and the soft love ballad "You're Still the One". All reaching the Top 10 in the UK, the most successful of these singles was a remix of "That Don't Impress Me Much", which despite only reaching number three in the singles chart became the seventh biggest selling single of the year. The album itself is the 11th biggest selling album in the UK with over 3 million copies sold and the second largest selling by a female solo artist, after Alanis Morissette's Jagged Little Pill. The album has sold 29 million copies worldwide and is her most successful album to date, making her a superstar in her own right. The album also topped the charts for a total of ten weeks during the year (11 weeks in total) and took the Christmas number one album position.

=== Pop acts ===
S Club 7 reached the top with their début single "Bring It All Back" in June and quickly became the most successful mixed pop group since ABBA. The only thing they failed to achieve was international success, despite making and releasing 4 successful TV series' three of which were filmed in different locations in the US. The group seemed to peak at #2 non-stop throughout the rest of the year with their two follow up singles and their début album all reaching this position.

British pop singer Lolly (real name Anna Kumble) was very successful scoring three Top 10 hits (two of which went Top 5) and her album also went Top 25. Her songs are well remembered for being criticised everywhere for being "cheesy", however still being very successful.

1970s punk rock band Blondie also made a surprise resurgence at the very beginning of the year, making #1 18 years after their previous Top 10 hit (and 19 years after their previous #1). "Maria", the band's sixth #1, was the first track taken from their #3 album, No Exit. The band started fresh as member differences and conflicts outside of the group had all been settled. Lead singer Debbie Harry continued to pursue acting as well as being a member of the group. She is the oldest female to make number one at 54 years of age, however Cher still holds the record for oldest solo female to reach the top. Despite topping the charts in several countries "Maria" never made number one in their US homeland.

=== Albums of 1999 ===
The albums to top the chart during the year were from a balance of genres. Although usually it is a domination of pop acts, rock and other acts were starting to top the charts more which were the first signs of a change towards wider appeal of other genres of albums to the public which continued to grow in the new millennium – 2004's album charts for example being dominated by rock bands. Blur, Stereophonics, Catatonia, Suede, Texas, Jamiroquai, The Chemical Brothers, Travis & Leftfield all hit number one on the albums chart, showing how rock, dance, and adult pop could also be big album sellers

Despite resistance from other genres, pop was not kept completely off the top. Steps' new album, Steptacular containing the million selling single "Tragedy", which hit #1 for one week in January topped the albums chart for 4 weeks and sold very well. A third re-issue of ABBA Gold: Greatest Hits pushed up sales of the album to over 3.6 million. Today it is the second biggest selling album of all time in the UK. Continuing the success of their album from 1998 were The Corrs with "Talk On Corners", which topped the charts for a further 4 weeks during 1999, making its total count 10 weeks.

=== Christmas number one ===
This particular Christmas number one was seen of great importance because it would be the one which would span into the new millennium. Many acts fought to claim this position including the likes of S-Club, Artful Dodger, Vengaboys and Steps, however only one act could claim it. Even John Lennon's 1981 #1 hit "Imagine" was re-issued, upon which it made #3. With strong desire to claim the Christmas number one that would span into the new millennium due to his longstanding association with Christmas chart toppers and Christmas releases, Cliff Richard shot straight to the top of the charts in early December with his special millennium release "The Millennium Prayer". It topped the UK charts for three weeks and everyone expected him to make the Christmas number one, however in Christmas week, the position he strongly desired to maintain was stolen from him by new phenomenon boyband, Westlife. Their covers of ABBA's #2 hit from 1979, "I Have A Dream" and Terry Jacks' #1 hit from 1974 "Seasons In The Sun", saw them steal the Christmas #1 spot and have their longest stay at the top of the charts – a four-week stay.

=== The rise of imports ===
1999 was notable for the number of number one hits that had already charted on import. The Vengaboys "We're Going to Ibiza", Lou Bega's "Mambo No 5", Christina Aguilera's "Genie in a bottle", Wamdue Project's "King of My Castle" and Eiffel 65's "Blue (Da Ba Dee)" all charted within the Top 75 prior to their UK release, with Eiffel 65 entering the Top 40 on import. Without doubt the most impressive performance on import was ATB's "9 PM (Till I Come)" which saw three separate imports charting within the Top 75 in addition to subsequent single "Don't Stop!" also entering the Top 75 on import before the UK release of 9pm.

Many other singles, particularly of the trance genre, also managed to reach the Top 200 prior to their official UK release.

== Charts ==
=== Number-one singles ===
Chart date (week ending)	Song	Artist(s)	Sales
2 January	"Chocolate Salty Balls"	Chef	320,000
9 January	"Heartbeat" / "Tragedy"	Steps	98,000
16 January	"Praise You"	Fatboy Slim	80,913
23 January	"A Little Bit More"	911	75,400
30 January	"Pretty Fly (For a White Guy)"	The Offspring	140,000
6 February	"You Don't Know Me"	Armand Van Helden featuring Duane Harden	118,500
13 February	"Maria"	Blondie	128,000
20 February	"Fly Away"	Lenny Kravitz	123,000
27 February	"...Baby One More Time"	Britney Spears	463,722
6 March	"...Baby One More Time"	Britney Spears	231,000
13 March	"When the Going Gets Tough"	Boyzone	213,000
20 March	"When the Going Gets Tough"	Boyzone	197,000
27 March	"Blame It on the Weatherman"	B*Witched	90,000
3 April	"Flat Beat"	Mr. Oizo	283,000
10 April	"Flat Beat"	Mr. Oizo	184,000
17 April	"Perfect Moment"	Martine McCutcheon	200,000
24 April	"Perfect Moment"	Martine McCutcheon	140,000
1 May	"Swear It Again"	Westlife	102,000
8 May	"Swear It Again"	Westlife	80,000
15 May	"I Want It That Way"	Backstreet Boys	93,000
22 May	"You Needed Me"	Boyzone	142,901
29 May	"Sweet Like Chocolate"	Shanks & Bigfoot	251,000
5 June	"Sweet Like Chocolate"	Shanks & Bigfoot	141,000
12 June	"Everybody's Free (To Wear Sunscreen)"	Baz Luhrmann	206,000
19 June	"Bring It All Back"	S Club 7	190,000
26 June	"Boom, Boom, Boom, Boom!!"	Vengaboys	134,279
3 July	"9pm (Till I Come)"	ATB	270,000
10 July	"9pm (Till I Come)"	ATB	108,000
17 July	"Livin' la Vida Loca"	Ricky Martin	131,000
24 July	"Livin' la Vida Loca"	Ricky Martin	125,000
31 July	"Livin' la Vida Loca"	Ricky Martin	96,600
7 August	"When You Say Nothing at All"	Ronan Keating	197,565
14 August	"When You Say Nothing at All"	Ronan Keating	100,000
21 August	"If I Let You Go"	Westlife	90,491
28 August	"Mi Chico Latino"	Geri Halliwell	132,000
4 September	"Mambo No. 5 (A Little Bit of...)"	Lou Bega	224,000
11 September	"Mambo No. 5 (A Little Bit of...)"	Lou Bega	175,000
18 September	"We're Going to Ibiza"	Vengaboys	142,809
25 September	"Blue (Da Ba Dee)"	Eiffel 65	226,500
2 October	"Blue (Da Ba Dee)"	Eiffel 65	164,500
9 October	"Blue (Da Ba Dee)"	Eiffel 65	141,000
16 October	"Genie in a Bottle"	Christina Aguilera	172,600
23 October	"Genie in a Bottle"	Christina Aguilera	123,000
30 October	"Flying Without Wings"	Westlife	92,000
6 November	"Keep On Movin'"	Five	137,000
13 November	"Lift Me Up"	Geri Halliwell	139,000
20 November	"She's the One" / "It's Only Us"	Robbie Williams	120,000
27 November	"King of My Castle"	Wamdue Project	148,000
4 December	"The Millennium Prayer"	Cliff Richard	147,000
11 December	"The Millennium Prayer"	Cliff Richard	158,000
18 December	"The Millennium Prayer"	Cliff Richard	159,000
25 December	"I Have a Dream" / "Seasons in the Sun"	Westlife	213,000

=== Number-one albums ===
Chart date (week ending)	Album	Artist	Sales
2 January	Ladies and Gentlemen: The Best of George Michael	George Michael	350,000
9 January	Ladies and Gentlemen: The Best of George Michael	George Michael	80,000
16 January	I've Been Expecting You	Robbie Williams	39,000
23 January	You've Come a Long Way, Baby	Fatboy Slim	37,500
30 January	You've Come a Long Way, Baby	Fatboy Slim	41,600
6 February	You've Come a Long Way, Baby	Fatboy Slim	
13 February	You've Come a Long Way, Baby	Fatboy Slim	30,000
20 February	I've Been Expecting You	Robbie Williams	38,000
27 February	Talk on Corners	The Corrs	42,041
6 March	Talk on Corners	The Corrs	65,800
13 March	Talk on Corners	The Corrs	60,000
20 March	Performance and Cocktails	Stereophonics	119,954
27 March	13	Blur	92,000
3 April	13	Blur	33,000
10 April	Talk on Corners	The Corrs	
17 April	ABBA Gold: Greatest Hits	ABBA	26,000
24 April	Equally Cursed and Blessed	Catatonia	60,000
1 May	Gold – Greatest Hits	ABBA	35,000
8 May	Gold – Greatest Hits	ABBA	56,000
15 May	Head Music	Suede	32,884
22 May	The Hush	Texas	92,000
29 May	Gold – Greatest Hits	ABBA	70,000
5 June	Gold – Greatest Hits	ABBA	59,000
12 June	By Request	Boyzone	329,176
19 June	By Request	Boyzone	145,000
26 June	Synkronized	Jamiroquai	98,000
3 July	Surrender	The Chemical Brothers	70,000
10 July	By Request	Boyzone	38,000
17 July	By Request	Boyzone	54,000
24 July	By Request	Boyzone	52,000
31 July	By Request	Boyzone	44,000
7 August	By Request	Boyzone	40,000
14 August	By Request	Boyzone	39,000
21 August	By Request	Boyzone	34,000
28 August	The Man Who	Travis	45,000
4 September	The Man Who	Travis	48,000
11 September	Come On Over	Shania Twain	57,000
18 September	Come On Over	Shania Twain	62,000
25 September	Come On Over	Shania Twain	70,072
2 October	Rhythm and Stealth	Leftfield	74,000
9 October	Reload	Tom Jones	80,000
16 October	Come On Over	Shania Twain	72,700
23 October	Come On Over	Shania Twain	59,000
30 October	Come On Over	Shania Twain	58,500
6 November	Steptacular	Steps	111,000
13 November	Steptacular	Steps	84,000
20 November	Steptacular	Steps	67,000
27 November	All the Way... A Decade of Song	Céline Dion	74,000
4 December	Steptacular	Steps	108,000
11 December	Come On Over	Shania Twain	105,000
18 December	Come On Over	Shania Twain	175,000
25 December	Come On Over	Shania Twain	184,000

=== Number-one compilation albums ===
Chart date (week ending)	Album
2 January	Now 41
9 January	Now 41
16 January	Now 41
23 January	Clubber's Guide to 99
30 January	The Best Club Anthems 99...Ever
6 February	Clubber's Guide to 99
13 February	Euphoria
20 February	Love Songs
27 February	Euphoria
6 March	Kiss House Nation
13 March	Kiss House Nation
20 March	Especially for You
27 March	Dance Nation 6 – Tall Paul/B Block
3 April	New Hits 99
10 April	Now 42
17 April	Now 42
24 April	Now 42
1 May	Now 42
8 May	Now 42
15 May	Now 42
22 May	Now 42
29 May	Trance Nation
5 June	Trance Nation
12 June	Trance Nation
19 June	Clubbers Guide to Ibiza – Summer '99
26 June	Clubbers Guide to Ibiza – Summer '99
3 July	Fresh Hits 99
10 July	Fresh Hits 99
17 July	Fresh Hits 99
24 July	Best Dance Album in the World...Ever 9
31 July	Now 43
7 August	Now 43
14 August	Now 43
21 August	Now 43
28 August	Ibiza Annual 99
4 September	Big Hits 99
11 September	Big Hits 99
18 September	Kiss Ibiza 99
25 September	Kiss Ibiza 99
2 October	Kiss Ibiza 99
9 October	Top of the Pops '99 – Volume 2
16 October	Trance Nation 2
23 October	Land of My Fathers
30 October	Now Dance 2000
6 November	Huge Hits 99
13 November	Huge Hits 99
20 November	Huge Hits 99
27 November	Huge Hits 99
4 December	Now 44
11 December	Now 44
18 December	Now 44
25 December	Now 44

== Year-end charts ==
Data based on sales from 3 January 1999 to 1 January 2000.

=== Best-selling singles ===
No.	Title	Artist	Peak position	Sales
1	"...Baby One More Time"	Britney Spears	1	1,445,300
2	"Blue (Da Ba Dee)"	Eiffel 65	1	956,100
3	"The Millennium Prayer"	Cliff Richard	1	860,900
4	"Mambo No. 5 (A Little Bit of...)"	Lou Bega	1	850,200
5	"9 PM (Till I Come)"	ATB	1	791,500
6	"Livin' La Vida Loca"	Ricky Martin	1	775,700
7	"That Don't Impress Me Much"	Shania Twain	3	763,000
8	"Sweet Like Chocolate"	Shanks and Bigfoot	1	706,700
9	"Flat Beat"	Mr Oizo	1	678,000
10	"When the Going Gets Tough"	Boyzone	1	671,400
11	"Bring It All Back"	S Club 7	1	
12	"Better Off Alone"	DJ Jurgen presents Alice Deejay	2	
13	"Genie in a Bottle"	Christina Aguilera	1	
14	"Perfect Moment"	Martine McCutcheon	1	
15	"Boom, Boom, Boom, Boom!!"	Vengaboys	1	
16	"No Scrubs"	TLC	3	
17	"If I Could Turn Back the Hands of Time"	R. Kelly	2	
18	"When You Say Nothing at All"	Ronan Keating	1	
19	"Heartbeat"/"Tragedy"	Steps	1	
20	"I Try"	Macy Gray	6	500,000
21	"2 Times"	Ann Lee	2	
22	"My Love Is Your Love"	Whitney Houston	2	493,000
23	"Beautiful Stranger"	Madonna	2	
24	"Turn Around"	Phats & Small	2	
25	"It's Not Right but It's Okay"	Whitney Houston	3	485,000
26	"I Have a Dream"/"Seasons in the Sun"	Westlife	1	
27	"Witch Doctor"	Cartoons	2	
28	"King of My Castle"	Wamdue Project	1	
29	"We Like to Party! (The Vengabus)"	Vengaboys	3	
30	"Pretty Fly (For a White Guy)"	The Offspring	1	
31	"Everybody's Free (To Wear Sunscreen)"	Baz Luhrmann	1	
32	"Wild Wild West"	Will Smith	2	
33	"Maria"	Blondie	1	
34	"Sometimes"	Britney Spears	3	
35	"I Want It That Way"	Backstreet Boys	1	
36	"Keep On Movin'"	Five	1	
37	"Re-Rewind (The Crowd Say Bo Selecta)"	The Artful Dodger featuring Craig David	2	
38	"We're Going to Ibiza!"	Vengaboys	1	
39	"Tender"	Blur	2	
40	"You Get What You Give"	New Radicals	5	
41	"My Name Is"	Eminem	2	
42	"Mi Chico Latino"	Geri Halliwell	1	
43	"The Launch"	DJ Jean	2	
44	"You Don't Know Me"	Armand van Helden featuring Duane Harden	1	
45	"(Mucho Mambo) Sway"	Shaft	2	
46	"Swear It Again"	Westlife	1	
47	"Man! I Feel Like a Woman!"	Shania Twain	3	
48	"She's the One"/"It's Only Us"	Robbie Williams	1	
49	"You Needed Me"	Boyzone	1	
50	"Fly Away"	Lenny Kravitz	1	

=== Best-selling albums ===
No.	Title	Artist	Peak position	Sales
1	Come On Over	Shania Twain	1	2,201,837
2	By Request	Boyzone	1	1,516,547
3	The Man Who	Travis	1	1,410,158
4	Gold: Greatest Hits	ABBA	1	1,253,187
5	Performance and Cocktails	Stereophonics	1	1,046,433
6	I've Been Expecting You	Robbie Williams	1	1,000,402
7	Steptacular	Steps	1	890,240
8	Talk on Corners	The Corrs	1	
9	Westlife	Westlife	2	
10	On How Life Is	Macy Gray	3	770,000
11	The Hush	Texas	1	
12	All the Way... A Decade of Song	Celine Dion	1	
13	You've Come a Long Way, Baby	Fatboy Slim	1	
14	...Baby One More Time	Britney Spears	4 (Note: Reached number 2 in 2000)	
15	My Love Is Your Love	Whitney Houston	4	
16	Step One	Steps	3 (Note: Reached number 2 in 1998)	
17	The Miseducation of Lauryn Hill	Lauryn Hill	2	
18	Songs from the Last Century	George Michael	2	
19	Forgiven, Not Forgotten	The Corrs	2	
20	The Party Album!	Vengaboys	6	
21	S Club	S Club 7	2	459,000
22	Ladies & Gentlemen: The Best of George Michael	George Michael	1	
23	Reload	Tom Jones	1	
24	Synkronized	Jamiroquai	1	
25	You Me & Us	Martine McCutcheon	2	
26	Greatest Hits III	Queen	5	
27	Invincible	Five	4	
28	FanMail	TLC	7	
29	Ray of Light	Madonna	7 (Note: Reached number 1 in 1998)	
30	The Greatest Hits	Cher	7	
31	Unplugged	The Corrs	9	
32	This Is My Truth Tell Me Yours	Manic Street Preachers	4 (Note: Reached number 1 in 1998)	
33	Life thru a Lens	Robbie Williams	8 (Note: Reached number 1 in 1998)	
34	Surrender	The Chemical Brothers	1	
35	Ricky Martin	Ricky Martin	2	
36	Charlotte Church	Charlotte Church	8	
37	Millennium	Backstreet Boys	2	
38	Gran Turismo	The Cardigans	8	
39	Schizophonic	Geri Halliwell	4	
40	Turn It On Again: The Hits	Genesis	4	
41	Willennium	Will Smith	10	
42	The Very Best of Dean Martin: The Capitol & Reprise Years	Dean Martin	5	
43	13	Blur	1	
44	The Best of Me	Bryan Adams	12	
45	Sogno	Andrea Bocelli	4	
46	Where We Belong	Boyzone	3 (Note: Reached number 1 in 1998)	
47	Equally Cursed and Blessed	Catatonia	1	
48	Believe	Cher	7	
49	Twenty Four Seven	Tina Turner	9	
50	Americana	The Offspring	10	

=== Best-selling compilation albums ===
No.	Title	Peak position	Sales
1	Now 44	1	1,442,000
2	Now 42	1	725,000
3	Now 43	1	661,000
4	Huge Hits 99	1	552,000
5	ABBAmania	2	483,000
6	Music of the Millennium	2	
7	The Annual: Millennium Edition	2	
8	Music to Watch Girls By	2	
9	Hits 2000	2	
10	Big Hits 99	1	406,000

== See also ==
- List of UK Dance Singles Chart number ones of 1999
- List of UK Independent Singles Chart number ones of 1999
