= List of UK Dance Singles Chart number ones of 1999 =

These are The Official UK Charts Company UK Dance Chart number one hits of 1999. The dates listed in the menus below represent the Saturday after the Sunday the chart was announced, as per the way the dates are given in chart publications such as the ones produced by Billboard, Guinness, and Virgin.

Issue date	Song	Artist
2 January	"What Ya Got 4 Me"	Signum
9 January	"1999"	Prince
16 January	"Praise You"	Fatboy Slim
23 January	"Cassius 1999"	Cassius
30 January	"Greece 2000"	Three Drives
6 February	"You Don't Know Me"	Armand Van Helden
13 February	"Can't Get Enough"	Soulsearcher
20 February	"Protect Your Mind (For the Love of a Princess)"	DJ Sakin & Friends
27 February	"What U Do"	Colours featuring Stephen Emmanuel & Eska
6 March	"Warhead/DNA"	Krust/Bio Mechanics
13 March	"Playing with Knives"	Bizarre Inc
20 March	"Bambatta"	Shy FX
27 March	"Everybody Get Up"	Capriccio
3 April	"Flat Beat"	Mr Oizo
10 April	"Turn Around"	Phats & Small
17 April	"Funk on Ah Roll"	James Brown
24 April	"Taboo"	Glamma Kid featuring Shola Ama
1 May	"Red Alert"	Basement Jaxx
8 May	"Red Alert"	Basement Jaxx
15 May	"Big Love"	Pete Heller
22 May	"What You Need"	Powerhouse featuring Duane Harden
29 May	"Sweet like Chocolate"	Shanks & Bigfoot
5 June	"Saltwater"	Chicane featuring Maire Brennan
12 June	"Hey Boy Hey Girl"	The Chemical Brothers
19 June	"Hey Boy Hey Girl"	The Chemical Brothers
26 June	"Cream"	Blank & Jones
3 July	"9 PM (Till I Come)"	ATB
10 July	"9 PM (Till I Come)"	ATB
17 July	"9 PM (Till I Come)"	ATB
24 July	"Synth & Strings"	Yomanda
31 July	"Better Off Alone"	Alice Deejay
7 August	"Straight from the Heart"	Doolally
14 August	"Rendez-Vu"	Basement Jaxx
21 August	"Rendez-Vu"	Basement Jaxx
28 August	"1999"	Binary Finary
4 September	"Sing It Back"	Moloko
11 September	"The Launch"	DJ Jean
18 September	"Afrika Shox"	Leftfield
25 September	"Toca Me"	Fragma
2 October	"Destination Sunrise"	Balearic Bill
9 October	"The Awakening"	York
16 October	"B with U"	Junior Sanchez featuring Dajae
23 October	"Out of Control"	The Chemical Brothers
30 October	"In and Out of My Life"	Onephatdeeva
6 November	"Buddy X 99"	Dreem Teem vs. Neneh Cherry
13 November	No Chart Published	No Chart Published
20 November	No Chart Published	No Chart Published
27 November	"King of My Castle"	Wamdue Project
4 December	No Chart Published	No Chart Published
11 December	"Re-Rewind (The Crowd Say Bo Selecta)"	Artful Dodger
18 December	"Barber's Adagio for Strings"	William Orbit
25 December	"A Little Bit of Luck"	DJ Luck & MC Neat

== See also ==
- 1999 in music
