= List of UK R&B Singles Chart number ones of 1999 =

The UK R&B Chart is a weekly chart that ranks the 40 biggest-selling singles and albums that are classified in the R&B genre in the United Kingdom. The chart is compiled by the Official Charts Company, and is based on physical and other physical formats like Compact Cassette and LP record. This is a list of the UK's biggest R&B hits of 1999.

== Number ones ==
Key
†	Best-selling R&B single of the year

Issue date	Single	Artist
3 January	"End of the Line"	Honeyz
10 January	"End of the Line"	Honeyz
17 January	"I Want You For Myself"	Another Level featuring Ghostface Killah
24 January	"Westside"	TQ
31 January	"These Are the Times"	Dru Hill
7 February	"Boy You Knock Me Out"	Tatyana Ali featuring Will Smith
14 February	"Changes"	2Pac featuring Talent
21 February	"Ex-Factor"	Lauryn Hill
28 February	"It's Not Right but It's Okay"	Whitney Houston
7 March	"It's Not Right but It's Okay"	Whitney Houston
14 March	"It's Not Right but It's Okay"	Whitney Houston
21 March	"It's Not Right but It's Okay"	Whitney Houston
28 March	"No Scrubs"	TLC
4 April	"My Name Is"	Eminem
11 April	"My Name Is"	Eminem
18 April	"My Name Is"	Eminem
25 April	"What's It Gonna Be?!"	Busta Rhymes
2 May	"No Scrubs"	TLC
9 May	"No Scrubs"	TLC
16 May	"No Scrubs"	TLC
23 May	"Sweet like Chocolate" †	Shanks & Bigfoot
30 May	"Sweet like Chocolate" †	Shanks & Bigfoot
6 June	"Sweet like Chocolate" †	Shanks & Bigfoot
13 June	"Sweet like Chocolate" †	Shanks & Bigfoot
20 June	"Sweet like Chocolate" †	Shanks & Bigfoot
27 June	"My Love Is Your Love"	Whitney Houston
4 July	"Wild Wild West"	Will Smith
11 July	"Wild Wild West"	Will Smith
18 July	"Bills, Bills, Bills"	Destiny's Child
25 July	"My Love Is Your Love"	Whitney Houston
1 August	"Wild Wild West"	Will Smith
8 August	"Guilty Conscience"	Eminem
15 August	"Guilty Conscience"	Eminem
22 August	"Unpretty"	TLC
29 August	"Summertime"	Another Level
5 September	"Unpretty"	TLC
12 September	"Unpretty"	TLC
19 September	"All n My Grill"	Missy Elliott featuring Big Boi and Nicole Wray
26 September	"All n My Grill"	Missy Elliott featuring Big Boi and Nicole Wray
3 October	"I Try"	Macy Gray
10 October	"Give It To You"	Jordan Knight
17 October	"I Try"	Macy Gray
24 October	"If I Could Turn Back the Hands of Time"	R. Kelly
31 October	"Heartbreaker"	Mariah Carey featuring Jay-Z
7 November	"If I Could Turn Back the Hands of Time"	R. Kelly
14 November	"Will 2K"	Will Smith featuring K-Ci
21 November	"Will 2K"	Will Smith featuring K-Ci
28 November	"I Try"	Macy Gray
5 December	"Turn Your Lights Down Low"	Bob Marley featuring Lauryn Hill
12 December	"I Try"	Macy Gray
19 December	"I Try"	Macy Gray
26 December	"I Try"	Macy Gray

== See also ==
- List of UK Dance Singles Chart number ones of 1999
- List of UK Independent Singles Chart number ones of 1999
- List of UK Rock & Metal Singles Chart number ones of 1999
- List of UK R&B Albums Chart number ones of 1999
