= Lenny Fontana =

American DJ

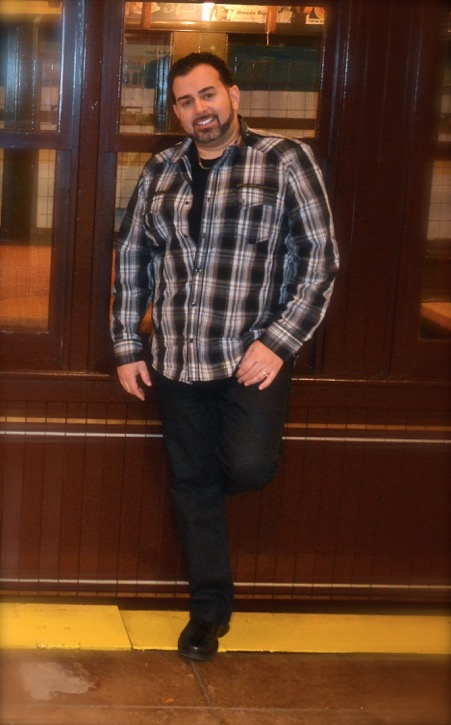

Background information
- Also known as: Powerhouse
- Born: Leonard Fontana; New York City, United States
- Genres: House, disco house
- Occupations: DJ, producer, remixer
- Instruments: Drum machine, synthesizer, electronic keyboards, sequencer
- Years active: 1985–present
- Labels: Karmic Power Records, FFRR, Strictly Rhythm
- Website: www.lennyfontana.com

Lenny Fontana is an American house music DJ from New York City.

== Biography ==
Fontana first began deejaying professionally in the mid-1980s, playing at clubs such as Studio 54 and The Underground NYC. His first major exposure was with the track "A Mystical Journey", which hit #30 on the US Billboard Hot Dance Club/Play chart in 1996. He won international recognition as part of the production team for Powerhouse featuring Duane Harden, who scored a #1 dance hit in the US with "What You Need"; the song also hit #13 on the UK Singles Chart. In 2000, he returned to the UK chart with "Chocolate Sensation" (featuring DJ Shorty), peaking at #39. He continues to make international appearances regularly. His 2008 single "Wait 4 U" (a collaboration with UK producer Ridney and vocalist Larisa) was released through the Ministry of Sound (Germany) in June that year. The track had already been used on Germany's Next Top Model 2008, and Ministry's. 2011 Reportage "A Tribute To Larry Levan" The show was first broadcast on BBC 6 Music in July 2011 as a 6 part series, 10 hour documentary. It has now been broadcast three times on BBC Radio 6 Music. In 2015 Lenny Fontana & D Train (music group) "Raise Your Hands" (Karmic Power Records) was a huge success as WMC Miami (Winter Music Conference) including remixes by David Morales.

In 2016, D-Train's follow-up single "When You Feel What Love Has" (Karmic Power Records) received worldwide attention and hit the #4 position on the Music Week Club Chart UK. With over 650 spins a week on daytime radio rotation in the US, the song hit the #31 position on the Nielsen Billboard Indicator Radio Chart (USA). In 2019, Fontana has worked with Chris Willis (the voice of David Guetta on a collaboration called “Top Of the World” (Double Up Records).

In 2021, Bucks Music Group has signed house DJ Lenny Fontana to a worldwide exclusive songwriting deal.

== True House Stories interview series (podcast) ==
In the summer of 2020, Lenny Fontana launched his weekly Facebook Live Stream show "True House Stories". Since the end of 2020, the podcast "True House Stories" series is available on YouTube, Spotify, Apple Podcast, Deezer, Amazon, Google Podcast, iHeart Radio etc.

The following artists have been interviewed by Lenny Fontana: Carl Cox, DJ Sneak, Little Louie Vega, David Morales, Danny Tenaglia, Marshall Jefferson, Mousse T., Norman Jay, Michael Gray and many more.

== True House Stories Podcast ==
Episodes

Episode	Guest	Year
142	Colin Dale	2025
141	Trevor Fung	2024
140	Mark James	2024
139	Paul Scott	2024
138	Tall Paul	2024
137	Mark Knight (Toolroom)	2024
136	Andy Van & John Course (Vicious Music)	2024
135	Gordon Mac	2024
134	Smokin Jo	2024
133	Paul Oakenfold	2024
132	LF System	2024
131	Norris Da Boss Windross	2024
130	DJ Spoony	2024
129	MC Creed	2024
128	WhO	2024
127	Leroy Gomez (Santa Esmeralda)	2023
126	Roland Clark	2023
125	Robert Coleman	2023
124	DJ Supa D	2023
123	Burrell Brothers	2023
122	Da Hofnar	2023
121	Jovonn	2023
120	Robert Clivilles (C & C Music Factory)	2023
119	Booker T	2023
118	Phil Fuldner	2023
117	Simon Dunmore	2023
116	Mark London	2023
115	Merlin Bob	2023
114	Disco Donnie	2023
113	Nick Hussey	2023
112	CINIMIN	2023
111	Craig Bartlett	2023
110	Paul Ibiza	2023
109	Steve Silk Hurley	2023
108	Terry Spame	2023
107	DJ Disciple	2023
106	Georgie Porgie	2023
105	Ricky Morrison	2023
104	Sam Divine (Defected Records)	2023
103	Bobby Shaw	2023
102	Melba Moore	2023
101	Robert Kool Bell (Kool & The Gang)	2023
100	Kathy Sledge (Legendary Lead Voice of Sister Sledge)	2022
099	EDX	2022
098	Mr.C	2022
097	Jim Shaft Ryan	2022
096	Erique Dial	2022
095	Fish Go Deep	2022
094	Tom Silverman (Tommy Boy Records)	2022
093	Bobby & Steve	2022
092	Victor Simonelli & Eric Kupper & Sunlight Square	2022
091	DJ Boris	2022
090	Crazy P	2022
089	Colin Hudd	2022
088	Benny Soto	2022
087	Dr. Packer	2022
086	Harry Romero	2022
085	Man Parrish	2022
084	DJ Meme	2022
083	Joe Causi	2022
082	Joe Smooth	2022
081	Dave Beer	2022
080	Mike Dunn	2022
079	Ken Walker aka Ken@Work	2022
078	Nicky Siano	2022
077	Steve Raine	2022
076	Jon Mancini	2022
075	Mark Farina	2022
074	JaBig	2021
073	Chad Jackson (DJ)	2021
072	Kayper	2021
071	Crystal Waters	2021
070	Johnny “D” De Mairo	2021
069	Ray Pinky Velazquez	2021
068	Jens Lissat	2021
067	Ron Carroll	2021
066	Darryl Payne	2021
065	Pedro Mondesir	2021
064	Eric Martin / Me One (Technotronic)	2021
063	Freddy Bastone	2021
062	Jazzy M	2021
061	Tim Lawrence	2021
060	Dave Darlington	2021
059	Nick Halkes	2021
058	Mousse T.	2021
057	Bob Blank	2021
056	Kym Mazelle	2021
055	Felipe Rose (Former Original Native Of Village People)	2021
054	DJ Paulette	2021
053	Alison Limerick	2021
052	Mark Riley (American radio host)	2021
051	Maurice Joshua	2021
050	Billie Ray Martin	2021
049	Ultra Naté	2021
048	Cerrone	2021
047	Linda Clifford	2021
046	Frankie Foncett	2021
045	Bruce Forest	2021
044	Hippie Torrales	2021
043	Richard Earnshaw	2021
042	Alex Lowes	2021
041	DJ Disciple	2021
040	Nicky Holloway	2021
039	Brandon Block & Alex P	2021
038	Ralphie Dee	2021
037	Ashley Beedle	2021
036	Teddy Douglas (The Basement Boys)	2021
035	A Dancer in Paradise	2021
034	Tyree Cooper	2021
033	Birdee	2021
032	Victor Simonelli	2021
031	Marsha Stern & Robbie Leslie	2021
030	Freddy Turner	2021
029	Graeme Park (DJ)	2021
028	Leee John	2021
027	David Morales	2021
026	Derrick McKenzie (Jamiroquai)	2021
025	Farley & Heller	2021
024	Ben Liebrand	2021
023	Greg Wilson (DJ)	2020
022	Little Louie Vega	2020
021	Tony Prince	2020
020	John Morales (Morales and Munzibai)	2020
019	Eric Kupper	2020
018	Byron Stingily (Ten City)	2020
017	The Ritchie Family	2020
016	E-Smoove	2020
015	Love To Be	2020
014	Gladys Pizarro	2020
013	Kathy Brown	2020
012	K Klass	2020
011	JKriv	2020
010	Mark Lower	2020
009	Seamus Haji	2020
008	Norman Jay	2020
007	Andy Williams	2020
006	Toney Lee	2020
005	D.C. LaRue	2020
004	Ce Ce Rogers	2020
003	Natasha Kitty Katt	2020
002	Michael Gray (DJ)	2020
001	Marshall Jefferson	2020

== True House Stories Podcast (Special Shows) ==
Episode	Guest	Year
006	Danny Tenaglia	2021
005	A Tribute To Michael Procter	2021
004	Carl Cox	2021
002	DJ Spen	2021
001	DJ Sneak	2021

== Discography ==
Singles (selection)

Year	Title	Label
2022	Lenny Fontana & Vangela Crowe – Hell Yeah (David Morales NYC Remixes)	Karmic Power Records
2022	Lenny Fontana & Vangela Crowe – Hell Yeah	Karmic Power Records
2022	Lenny Fontana – Give It To Me	Karmic Power Records
2021	Lenny Fontana – Love Affection	Karmic Power Records
2021	Lenny Fontana – Spinning Around	Karmic Power Records
2021	Lenny Fontana – Music Makes Love To You	Karmic Power Records
2021	Lenny Fontana – Turn the Horn Upside Down	Karmic Power Records
2021	Lenny Fontana – Everybody Reach	Karmic Power Records
2020	Lenny Fontana & Leee John – Could Have Been You	Karmic Power Records
2020	Lenny Fontana & Kristen Gray – Mighty Love	Karmic Power Records
2020	Lenny Fontana Feat. New York Thunder – Holler	Odyssey Records
2020	Lenny Fontana & Tonya Wynne – Here's My Love	Karmic Power Records
2020	Lenny Fontana & Black Sun – Spread Love	Skint Records / BMG
2020	Lenny Fontana – Feelin Happy	Karmic Power Records
2020	Lenny Fontana & Nemah – Stand Up And Believe	Karmic Power Records
2020	Lenny Fontana – Space Walker	Karmic Power Records
2019	Chris Willis & Lenny Fontana – Top Of The World	Double Up Records / Karmic Power Records
2019	Lenny Fontana & DJ Alexia – Love Disco	Karmic Power Records
2018	Lenny Fontana & Shirley Lites – Fire (Dr. Packer Remixes)	Midnight Riot Records / Karmic Power Records
2018	Lenny Fontana & Shirley Lites – Fire	Karmic Power Records
2018	Lenny Fontana & Alison Limerick – Bye Bye	Karmic Power Records
2017	Reuben Keeney & Lenny Fontana – Larry	Freakin909
2016	Lenny Fontana Pres. The Starletts – On His Mind	Karmic Power Records
2016	Lenny Fontana feat. D Train (music group) – When You Feel What Love Has	Karmic Power Records
2016	Lenny Fontana feat. Karla Brown – I'm Gonna Get You	Karmic Power Records
2015	Lenny Fontana – Twilight	Soulful Legends
2015	Lenny Fontana – Bump	Good For You Records
2015	Lenny Fontana feat. Tommy Rando – Hope For The World	Karmic Power Records
2015	Lenny Fontana feat. Paula P´Cay – On My Own	Karmic Power Records
2015	Lenny Fontana feat. D-Train – Raise Your Hands	Karmic Power Records // RFC Records
2015	Lenny Fontana – Chocolate Sensation	CR2 // Karmic Power Records
2015	Lenny Fontana – I Get A Good Feeling	Karmic Power Records
2014	Lenny Fontana & Marcus Knight feat. Carole Syvlan – I'm So High	Karmic Power Records
2014	Lenny Fontana – Feel It	Karmic Power Records
2014	Lenny Fontana & Lorenzo Perrotta – You Got The Feeling	Karmic Power Records
2014	Lenny Fontana – Believe	Nervous Records // Karmic Power Records
2014	Lenny Fontana – Wickey	Karmic Power Records
2014	Lenny Fontana – Oh Baby Baby	Karmic Power Records
2014	Lenny Fontana feat. Keva The Diva – I Don't Want You Back	Vamos Music // Karmic Power Records
2014	Lenny Fontana – We The People	Karmic Power Records
2013	Lenny Fontana – Everybody Put Your Hands Up	Karmic Power Records
2013	Lenny Fontana pres. Dee Wiz & Universal Sounds Band – Music Makes You Wanna	Karmic Power Records
2011	Lenny Fontana & D Train – Invincible	Caus-N-ff-ct
2010	Lenny Fontana & Revi – Gone	Caus-N-ff-ct
2009	Jean Claude Ades vs. Lenny Fontana feat. Tyra – Nite Time	Swing / Kontor Records
2009	James Talk & Ridney feat. Lenny Fontana & Jason Walker – What You Need	CR2
2008	Lenny Fontana & Ridney pres. Larisa –Wait 4 U	Ministry of Sound/Hard2Beat Records/Net's Work International
2008	Lenny Fontana feat. Carla Prather – One Day	Raisani Records
2008	Lenny Fontana – Blood Vibe	Bottom Line Records
2008	Lenny Fontana Feat. Krista – Prove Me Wrong	Paprika Beat / Henry Street Music
2007	Lenny Fontana & Mike Morin – Brooklym Medlom	Mashtronic
2007	Lenny Fontana & Mike Morin – Electrix	Odyssey Records
2007	Lenny Fontana Feat. Annbee – I'm Addicted	Odyssey Records
2007	Lenny Fontana & Mike Morin – Terminal	Odyssey Records
2007	Lenny Fontana & Mike Morin – Champion Of Love / Quadrant Mechanic	Odyssey Records
2006	Lenny Fontana & Joi Cardwell – Make It Alright	Stalwart
2005	Lenny Fontana pres. Octahvia – The Way	Defected Records
2005	Lenny Fontana Presents Byron Stingily – I'll Give You	Odyssey Records
2005	Lenny Fontana – The Way You Love Me	Odyssey Records
2005	Lenny Fontana feat. Carla Prather – One Day	Odyssey Records
2005	Lenny Fontana feat. Black Masses – U Know How To Love Me	Odyssey Records
2005	Lenny Fontana – Give It Up / Scat 'Til It Feels Good	Odyssey Records
2005	Lenny Fontana & Jonathan Trattner – Puma Fied	Odyssey Records
2004	Lenny Fontana feat. Leee John – Could Have Been You	Reelhouse
2004	Lenny Fontana pres. Zhana – Are You Ready	Odyssey Records
2004	Lenny Fontana pres. Cassioware – You're So Beautiful	Odyssey Records
2003	Lenny Fontana pres. Barrio Children – Latin Quarter	Samba2
2003	Lenny Fontana pres. Carla Sylvan – Everybody Say Yeah	Odyssey Records
2002	Lenny Fontana pres. Byron Stingily – Light My Fire	Reelhouse / Odyssey Records
2002	Lenny Fontana feat. Darryl D'Bonneau – Can We Do It	Odyssey Records
2001	Lenny Fontana feat. Darryl D'Bonneau – Pow Pow Pow	Strictly Rhythm
2000	Lenny Fontana pres. Black Sun – Work To Do	Estereo
2000	Lenny Fontana pres. The Exclusive Club feat. Sonya Rogers – Touch & Go	Distance
1999	Powerhouse feat. Duane Harden – What You Need	Strictly Rhythm
1999	Lenny Fontana & DJ Shorty – Chocolate Sensation	FFRR
1999	Lenny Fontana Presents The Exclusive Club Feat. Freddy Turner – Thinkin' About Your Love	Distance
1999	Lenny Fontana Presents Black Sun – Spread Love	Estereo
1998	Lenny Fontana pres. Lifeline – Stompin In America	Azuli Records
1998	Lenny Fontana pres. Black Sun – Spread Love	Estereo
1997	Lenny Fontana Presents Harvest – Spirit Of The Sun	Public Demand
1997	Lenny Fontana Presents The East Side Movement – Inner City	Nite Grooves
1996	The Sound Of One – Do You Want It	Underground Music Movement
1996	Lenny Fontana pres. Carole Sylvan – Everything You Do	Kult
1996	Lenny Fontana Presents The Fontana Sextet Featuring Angee Blake – Reach For The Sky	Centrestage Records
1995	Lenny Fontana Presents Galaxy People – A Mystical Journey	Clear Music NYC
1995	Lenny Fontana – Get Down And Get Funky	Waako Records
1994	Mass Production – Do It To The Music	Kult Records
1994	Loco Motion – Ritmo Loco	Sumo Records
1994	Tension Feat Anthony Molloy – Love Me, Hold Me	Azuli
1994	Cloud Burst – A Day In The Shade	Thumpin!
1994	Lenny Fontana & Michael Paternostro pres. Overload – I Believe/C'Mon Get With It	Cutting Records
1993	Frontline Symphony – Love & Affection	Strictly Rhythm
1993	Lenny Fontana – A Day In May	50/50 Records
1993	Eruption – Keep It Goin`/ Feel It	Thumpin!
1993	The Funky Fusion Band – EP	Eightball Records
1993	Tension – A Place Called Heaven	Azuli Records
1993	Devastating Feat Barbara Dixon – Wanna Be With You	Bottom Line Records
1992	Butch Quick – Higher	Strictly Rhythm
1992	Lenny Fontana – Black Jazz E.P	Velvet City Records
1992	Fontasia – Happy Moments / Blood Vibe	Bottom Line Records
1991	T. Solomon Feat. Tony Moss – I Got U	Partners INC
1989	Lenny Fontana – Badudah House	White Label

Remixes (selection)

Year	Title	Label
2021	Lomax & Michael Procter – I Got Love (Lenny Fontana’s True House Stories Remix)	Quantize Recordings
2021	Gregory Sigma & Benji Adeyemo – Love On A Mountain (Lenny Fontana & True House Story Vocal Remix)	Electronic Friends Music
2020	Eddie Amador & Coco Street – When I First Felt House (Lenny Fontana's NYC House Remix)	Nu Soul Records
2020	David Corbell – We Are Love (Lenny Fontana True House Story Remix)	Rework Records
2020	Beat Rivals & Lifford – Stay In The Groove (Lenny Fontana True House Story Remix)	Rival Beat Records
2020	GMGN & Saucy Lady – It's Time (Lenny Fontana Space Disco Mix)	toucan sounds
2019	Sulene Fleming – Solo (Lenny Fontana NYC Remix)	Future Spin Records
2019	Dion Todd Feat. Maya – Be Alright (Lenny Fontana Vocal Remix)	Shyre
2019	HeadRocka Feat. Darcelle – Mine (Lenny Fontana Remix)	City Heat Productions
2018	Alex Poet & Eddy Queens – Brighter Days (Lenny Fontana Remix)	Hot Slice Recordings
2018	Keith Nunnally – So Satisfied (Lenny Fontana Remix)	Quantize Recordings
2018	Flauschig – House Music (Lenny Fontana Remix)	Karmic Power Records
2017	Darren Sains & Dashi – Come On Let's Go (Lenny Fontana Remix)	Karmic Power Records
2017	Sky Keegan Vs. DJ Sonarm – Dust Of A Dream (Lenny Fontana Remix)	inYRface Recordings
2017	Chris "The Greek" Panaghi – Breathe (Lenny Fontana Radio Mix)	DJG Records
2016	Jonathan Trattner – In Too Deep (Lenny Fontana Remix)	Hilo
2016	Andrea Marr – Grateful (Lenny Fontana Nyc Classic Club Remix)	Generation Entertainment
2015	Oliver Gunning & Dharshana – Outlines (Lenny Fontana Remix)	Karmic Power Records
2015	Jerk In The Box – Sugar (Lenny Fontana Remix)	Karmic Power Records
2015	Darryl D'Bonneau & Kenny Bobien – Heaven (Lenny Fontana Remix) (Lenny Fontana Remix)	Atwork Records
2015	Daniele Sexxx Feat. Paula P'Cay – Lift Me Up (Lenny Fontana Remix) (Lenny Fontana Remix)	Karmic Power Records
2014	Jack Shakes – Only You (Lenny Fontana Remix)	Karmic Power Records
2014	Alessandro Otiz – Just Be My Self (Lenny Fontana Remix)	Karmic Power Records
2014	Elusiv3 – My Soul (Lenny Fontana Remix)	Karmic Power Records
2014	Holy Deep – Puma Punku (Lenny Fontana Remix)	Karmic Power Records
2014	Lorenzo Perrotta feat. Karmen Novko – Burning (Lenny Fontana Remix)	Karmic Power Records
2013	House Of Virus & Marshall Jefferson Feat. Soliaris – Believe In Love (Lenny Fontana Remix)	Karmic Power Records
2013	Luyo – Hungry For Love (Lenny Fontana Remix)	Double Cheese Records
2013	Michele McCain – Your Love (Lenny Fontana & Gabi Newman Classic Mix)	Grooveland Music
2012	Brothers In Progress – Giosiana (Marcus Knight & Lenny Fontana Remix)	Monique Speciale
2011	Countess Luann – Chic C'est La Vie (Lenny Fontana & Gabi Newman Remix)	Ultra Records
2011	Carolyn Harding – Superstar (Lenny Fontana Vocal Mix)	Easy Street
2011	Danny Clark & Jay Benham Feat. Natasha Watts – Feel My Beat (Lenny Fontana & Gabi Newman Mix)	Solid Ground Recordings
2010	Luke Lawson – History (The Whiteliner vs. Lenny Fontana Remix)	Join Hands Records
2010	Toni Granello Feat. Linda Lee Hopkins – Too Much Pressure (Lenny Fontana Remix)	MAP Dance
2010	Dj DLG & Giorgio Moroder – From Here to Eternity (Lenny Fontana vs. The Whiteliner Remix)	Caus-N-ff-ct
2010	Calvin Bosco & Chris Bekker Feat. Giorgio Moroder – The Chase (Lenny Fontana Versus The Whiteliner Mix)	Raboisen Records
2010	Nogales & Maniera – Trompetentanz (Lenny Fontana Remix)	Caus-N-ff-ct
2010	A.C.K. & Simon Point – Welcome To My World (Lenny Fontana Remix)	Mylo Germany
2009	Stephanie Cooke – I Thank You (Lenny Fontana Remix)	King Street Sounds
2009	Eric Tyrell feat. Carl Avory – Wheels of Industry (The Whiteliner vs. Lenny Fontana Mix)	Housesession Records
2009	Salah Feat. Isaac – Shine Through (The Whiteliner vs. Lenny Fontana Mix)	GaGa Records
2009	Massi & De Leon ft. Breathwaite – Livin The Bass Life (Lenny Fontana Remix)	Hilo Records
2008	Benji Candelario feat. Arnold Jarvis – Learn To Give (Lenny Fontana Remix)	Transitori Music
2007	House Dawgs – Praise Him (Lenny Fontana Remix)	Nervous Records
2005	Mila – Show Your Feelings Inside (Lenny Fontana Remix)	Kult Records
2003	Spanky Wonderland – How Many Times (Lenny Fontana Remix)	Map Dance
2002	Kings of Tomorrow – Tear it up (Lenny Fontana Remix)	Distance
2002	Orange Soul Feat. Angie Brown – Tower Of Love (Lenny Fontana Remix)	Milk & Sugar Recordings
2002	Moses McClean Pres. Carolyn Harding – Superstar (Lenny Fontana Vocal Mix)	Easy Street
2001	DJ Chus & David Penn (DJ) Feat. Darren J. Bell – Sunshine (Lenny Fontana's Classic Remix)	Black Vinyl Records
2001	Cerrone Feat. She Belle – Supernature (Lenny Fontana's Down Under Vocal Mix)	Urban (Universal Music)
2001	Plutonic – Addicted (Lenny Fontana Soul Addiction Remix)	Solo Recordings
2001	Upside Feat. Tanya Louise – People (Lenny Fontana Remix)	Movin' Records
2001	Spike – A Moment Of Love (Lenny Fontana Remix)	Zeitgeist
2001	Filur Feat. Nellie Ettison – Shame (Lenny Fontana Vocal Mix)	disco:wax
2001	Sunseeker feat. Crystal Waters – Nights In Egypt (Lenny Fontana Vocal Remix)	Deep Culture
2001	Pound Boys Feat. RaSheen Houston – Shine (Lenny Fontana Remix)	Rekorde Of Interest
2000	Angels of Love – One Night Love Affair (Lenny Fontana's Sensational Vocal Mix)	Neo
1999	Hannah Jones – Was That All It Was – Funky People (Lenny's Powerhouse Remix)	Nervous Records (US)
1999	Marcel Krieg & Kid Batchelore – Spring Affair (Lenny Fontana's Retro Disco Remix)	Caus-N-ff-ct Records
1999	Blaze pres. Funky People feat. Cassio Ware – Funky People (Lenny Fontana Vocal Mix)	Universal Records GmbH / Universal Music Group
1999	The Rise – Love Is Gonna Be There (Lenny Fontana Remix)	Multiply
1999	Shazz Feat. Ken Norris – Innerside (Lenny Fontana Remix)	Distance Records
1999	Sister Soul – How Long Can I Wait Around (Lenny Fontana Remix)	Slip'N'Slide Records
1999	Crispin J Glover Presents Philip Ramirez – It's Music (Lenny Fontana Classic Vocal Remix)	Nitelife
1999	Frank 'O Moiraghi Featuring Amnesia – Turn Your Love Around (Lenny Fontana Remix)	Le Club
1998	Deep Swing – I Am Somebody (Lenny Fontana Remix)	Kult Records
1998	Elements of Soul Feat. Richard Rogers – Come With Me (Lenny Fontana Remix)	Soulshine
1998	Underground Dwellers Pres. Ja´Nel – I'm A Queen (Lenny Fontana Garage Remix)	Yellorange
1998	Hinda Hicks – If You Want Me (Lenny Fontana's System Vocal Remix)	Island Records / Polygram
1997	Hidden Talent – Bee Gee (Lenny's Slam Da Floor Mix)	DiFFUSION
1997	DJ Romaine – Justified (Lenny Fontana Remix)	Raise the Roof Productions
1997	House Dawgs – Praise Him (Lenny Fontana Deep In The System Mix)	Nervous Records
1997	Rivera & Trattner Pres. Peaceable Kingdom – Dance Of Passion (Lenny Fontana Remix)	Hilo
1997	Deep Bros. Feat. Michael Watford – You Got It (Lenny Fontana Deep In The System Mix)	Azuli
1996	Nu Colours – I Wanna Go Back (To When) (Lenny Fontana Remix)	Wildcard
1996	NYC Peech Boys – Stay With Me (Lenny Fontana Remix)	Free Bass
1996	Rebekah Ryan – You Lift Me Up (Lenny Fontana Remix)	MCA Records
1996	Rhythm Of Soul Feat. Freddy Turner – Wanna Live 4 U (Lenny Fontana Remix)	Clear Music NYC
1995	DJ Spen Pres. Jasper Street Company – A Feeling (Lenny Fontana Authentic Vocal Remix)	Azuli
1995	West End – Love Rules (Lenny Fontana Anthem Remix)	BMG / Bertelsmann Music Group
1995	One Family – We Got Love (L&V Classic Anthem Mix)	Public Demand
1995	Janet Rushmore – Try My Love (Lenny Fontana Remix)	Dig It International
1995	The Undergraduates – Hipswinger (Lenny Fontana Remix)	Big Big Trax
1995	Soul Corporation Feat. Connie Harvey – Make It Happen (Victor Simonelli & Lenny Fontana Remixes)	Bassline Records
1995	V.P.D. – Celebrate The World (Lenny Fontana Dub Of Misery)	PWL Records
1995	Jasper Street Company – A Feeling (Lenny Fontana Authentic Vocal Mix)	Azuli Records
1995	Fibre Foundation – Free Your Mind (Lenny Fontana Remix)	Kult
1994	Project 4007 Feat. James Howard & Joe Wormly – It's Our Turn (Turn It Out Drum)	Emotive Records

== See also ==
- DJ UCH, American radio presenter, mixshow DJ, and house music producer
