= Sing-A-Long =

Single by Shanks & Bigfoot

from the album Swings and Roundabouts
- Released: 17 July 2000
- Genre: UK garage
- Length: 3:29
- Label: Jive, Zomba
- Songwriters: Danny Langsman, Steven Meade
- Producers: Shanks & Bigfoot

Shanks & Bigfoot singles chronology
"Watch This Space" (2000)	"Sing-A-Long" (2000)	"Trust in Me" (2001)

"Sing-A-Long" is a song by the UK garage duo Shanks & Bigfoot, released on 17 July 2000. The song did not match the success of their previous UK number-one hit, "Sweet like Chocolate", but was still a hit single, peaking at number 12 on the UK Singles Chart and number one on both the UK Dance and Independent charts. Terri Walker provides vocals on the song.

== Track listing ==
European CD maxi-single

1. "Sing-A-Long" (Shanks & Bigfoot original 7-inch) – 3:29
2. "Sing-A-Long" (Wideboys vocal remix) – 4:43
3. "Sing-A-Long" (Mutiny dub) – 6:21
4. "Sing-A-Long" (Junkie XL dub) – 10:25
5. "Sing-A-Long" (Shanks & Bigfoot original extended) – 6:44
6. "Sing-A-Long" (Mutiny vocal) – 8:56

== Charts ==
=== Weekly charts ===
Weekly chart performance for "Sing-A-Long"
Chart (2000)	Peak position
Australia (ARIA)	84
Europe (Eurochart Hot 100)	51
Scotland Singles (OCC)	29
UK Singles (OCC)	12
UK Dance (OCC)	1
UK Indie (OCC)	1

=== Year-end charts ===
Year-end chart performance for "Sing-A-Long"
Chart (2000)	Position
UK Singles (OCC)	182
