= Nightclubbing =

Nightclubbing may refer to:

- Nightclubbing (Grace Jones album), 1981
- Nightclubbing (Blank & Jones album), 2001
- "Nightclubbing" (song), a 1977 song by Iggy Pop, from the album The Idiot
- Nightclubbing: The Birth of Punk Rock in NYC, a 2022 documentary film
- Nightclubbing, going out to a nightclub
