= List of UK Independent Singles Chart number ones of 1999 =

These are the Official Charts Company's UK Official Indie Chart number-one hits of 1999.

Issue date	Song	Artist
2 January	"Heartbeat/Tragedy"	Steps
9 January ^{[a]}	"Heartbeat/Tragedy"	Steps
16 January ^{[a]}	"Praise You"	Fatboy Slim
23 January	"Praise You"	Fatboy Slim
30 January	"Heartbeat/Tragedy"	Steps
6 February	"Good Life (Buena Vida)"	Inner City
13 February	"Heartbeat/Tragedy"	Steps
20 February	"Changes"	2Pac
27 February ^{[a]}	"...Baby One More Time"	Britney Spears
6 March	"...Baby One More Time"	Britney Spears
13 March	"...Baby One More Time"	Britney Spears
20 March	"Better Best Forgotten"	Steps
27 March	"...Baby One More Time"	Britney Spears
3 April ^{[a]}	"Flat Beat"	Mr. Oizo
10 April	"Flat Beat"	Mr. Oizo
17 April	"Flat Beat"	Mr. Oizo
24 April	"Electricity"	Suede
1 May	"Right Here, Right Now"	Fatboy Slim
8 May	"Red Alert"	Basement Jaxx
15 May ^{[a]}	"I Want It That Way"	Backstreet Boys
22 May	"I Want It That Way"	Backstreet Boys
29 May	"I Want It That Way"	Backstreet Boys
5 June ^{[a]}	"Sweet like Chocolate"	Shanks & Bigfoot
12 June ^{[a]}	"Sweet like Chocolate"	Shanks & Bigfoot
19 June	"Sweet like Chocolate"	Shanks & Bigfoot
26 June	"Sometimes"	Britney Spears
3 July	"Sometimes"	Britney Spears
10 July	"Sometimes"	Britney Spears
17 July	"Sometimes"	Britney Spears
24 July	"Love's Got a Hold on My Heart"	Steps
31 July	"Love's Got a Hold on My Heart"	Steps
7 August	"Straight from the Heart"	Doolally
14 August	"Rendez-Vu"	Basement Jaxx
21 August	"Rendez-Vu"	Basement Jaxx
28 August	"King of Snake"	Underworld
4 September	"Sing It Back"	Moloko
11 September	"Sing It Back"	Moloko
18 September	"Sing It Back"	Moloko
25 September	"Sun Is Shining"	Bob Marley vs. Funkstar De Luxe
2 October	"Sun Is Shining"	Bob Marley vs. Funkstar De Luxe
9 October	"Sun Is Shining"	Bob Marley vs. Funkstar De Luxe
16 October	"Sun Is Shining"	Bob Marley vs. Funkstar De Luxe
23 October	"Going Underground/Carnation"	Buffalo Tom/Liam Gallagher
30 October	"If I Could Turn Back the Hands of Time"	R. Kelly
6 November	"If I Could Turn Back the Hands of Time"	R. Kelly
13 November	"If I Could Turn Back the Hands of Time"	R. Kelly
20 November	"Hurry Up and Wait"	Stereophonics
27 November	"The Millennium Prayer"	Cliff Richard
4 December ^{[a]}	"The Millennium Prayer"	Cliff Richard
11 December ^{[a]}	"The Millennium Prayer"	Cliff Richard
18 December ^{[a]}	"The Millennium Prayer"	Cliff Richard
25 December	"The Millennium Prayer"	Cliff Richard

== Notes ==
- ^{a} – The single was simultaneously number-one on the singles chart.

== See also ==
- 1999 in music
