= DJ UCH =

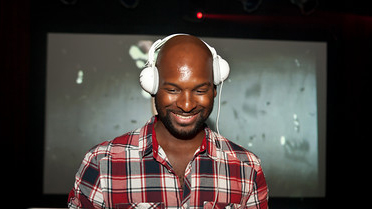
- DJ UCH performing live.

Background information
- Also known as: DJ Uch
- Born: Uchenna Martin Anyanwu; August 30, 1979 (age 46); New York City, United States
- Genres: House Music, Tech House, Deep House
- Occupations: DJ, producer, remixer
- Years active: 2004–present
- Labels: InHouse Records, Phoenix Music, Levan Records, Monitor Sound Recordings, Kult Records, Nova27 Records
- Website: (Official Website)

Uchenna Martin Anyanwu (born August 30, 1979) in New York City, known professionally as Uch or DJ Uch is an American radio presenter, mixshow DJ, and house music producer who grew up in The Bronx, New York.

== Career in radio ==
Uch began his dj career through radio, and has interviewed many artists in dance music including Matthew Dear, Chus & Ceballos, Annet Artani, The Riddler, Lucas Prata, Kaskade and David Guetta. He was a host of the Pump It Up Radio program on Harlem's WHCR-FM and a mixshow dj for Long Island's WPTY.

== Musical career ==
Uch began producing music in 2008 and has remixed for Lori Michaels and Oba Frank Lords amongst other artists. He currently produces on Todd Terry's InHouse Records amongst other house record labels. In 2011, he released the Imo State EP, an original composition for the Giuseppe D led label Monitor Sound Recordings, and in 2013, Uch began using Imo State as an alias for his underground productions.

=== Discography ===
Singles:

- 2020: Genius of House
- 2019: Champion Sound (with Mike Ivy)
- 2018: Hey Baby
- 2018: Ketty White (with Ooomeeey)
- 2018: 5 for 20 (with Ooomeeey)
- 2018: Off the Rails (with Ooomeeey)
- 2018: Mushroom Hill (with Ooomeeey)
- 2017: XTC in Germany
- 2017: San Francisco Treat
- 2017: So What (feat. Larisa)
- 2017: Freak It
- 2017: Take My Hand (feat. Violetta Vee)
- 2016: With Love
- 2016: Duck Down
- 2016: I Need
- 2016: Music For Me
- 2016: Shady (feat. Angelica De No)
- 2016: Love 4 Life
- 2016: Drunk in DC10
- 2016: Ibiza Nights
- 2016: Reade Street
- 2015: Frente Del Mar (with Anderson)
- 2015: Perception (with Alexander J)
- 2015: Sadie (Remix EP)
- 2015: Phuket Bounce
- 2015: Give It 2 Me (feat. Yana & Imo State)
- 2015: Really Good
- 2014: Sadie
- 2014: "Let Me Know" (feat. Larisa)
- 2014: "Amor Ibiza: The Remix"
- 2014: "Open Book: The Remix" (with DJ Giovanni, Billy Brown, & GinaMarie Z)
- 2013: "Open Book" (with DJ Giovanni, Billy Brown, & GinaMarie Z)
- 2013: "Tell Me"
- 2012: "Limelight (Party With U Baby)" (feat. Vice Verse)
- 2012: "Move My Body" (feat. Via Melissa)
- 2012: "Amor Ibiza" (feat. Tess)

Remixes:

- 2017: "Goosebumps (DJ Uch Remix)" - Travis Scott
- 2017: "Mask Off (DJ Uch Remix)" - Future
- 2017: "Hurt Bae" - DJ UCH
- 2017: "Catch Me Outside" - DJ UCH
- 2016: "We Don't Talk Anymore (DJ Uch Remix)" - Charlie Puth & Selena Gomez (#FORTHEFANS Series)
- 2016: "You're A DJ (Uch Remix)" - The Wannabees (#FORTHEFANS Series)
- 2016: "Freak Like Me (DJ Uch Remix)" - DJ Deeon, Lee Walker (#FORTHEFANS Series)
- 2016: "This Girl (DJ Uch Remix)" - Kungs, Cookin' on 3 Burners (#FORTHEFANS Series)
- 2016: "9PM (DJ Uch Remix)" - ATB (#FORTHEFANS Series)
- 2016: "March Madness (DJ Uch Remix)" - Future (#FORTHEFANS Series)
- 2016: "Who's That Girl (Dj Uch Remix)" - Eve (#FORTHEFANS Series)
- 2016: "All The Way Up (DJ Uch Remix)" - Fat Joe, Remy Ma, French Montana (#FORTHEFANS Series)
- 2016: "Welcome To Jam Rock (DJ Uch Remix)" - Damian Marley (#FORTHEFANS Series)
- 2015: "Nova27" - Retro Jay [Nova27 Records]
- 2014: "Crazy For You" - Sam Dungate & Imo State
- 2013: "Crank Up The Music" - Izzy Rock feat. Hondo Vega
- 2013: "This Is Cielo" - MDW
- 2012: "Stalker" - Sugur Shane
- 2012: "Bump" - King Ralphy
- 2011: "Dale" - Chris Costanzo feat. Michael M
- 2011: "Ibiza" - Giorgio
- 2011: "Electro Bump" - MDW
- 2011: "Rumble" - Oba Frank Lords
- 2010: "Rebound" - Lori Michaels

Mixtapes:

- 2014: Is This Love?
- 2014: #UCHMusic 01

Productions as Imo State:

- 2016: Body 2 Body [Nova27 Records]
- 2016: Clap Back [Nova27 Records]
- 2015: Sadie (Remix EP)
- 2015: Give It 2 Me (with Yana & Uch)
- 2015: Winter Remix EP (with Retro Jay and Uch)
- 2014: Sam Dungate & Imo State - Crazy For You
- 2014: Izzy Rock - Bang Bang The Drums (Imo State Remix)
- 2014: Winter Darling, John Spinosa, DJ Amoroso - Dark Kiss (Imo State Remix) [Nova27 Records]
- 2013: Imo State - RIhanna's Baby [Nova27 Records]

== See also ==
- Lenny Fontana, American house music DJ from New York City
