= Untitled (Terri Walker album) =

Studio album by Terri Walker
- Released: 3 March 2003
- Recorded: 2002; Soho Recording Studios, London; Larrabee Sound Studio, North Hollywood, CA
- Genre: R&B; soul
- Length: 54:08
- Label: Def Soul; Mercury Records
- Producer: Dean Zepherin - Executive Producer

Terri Walker chronology
Untitled (2003)	L.O.V.E (2005)

Untitled is the title of the debut album from UK R&B / soul singer Terri Walker. The album was released in 2003 by Def Soul/Mercury Records and spawned 3 singles, "Guess You Didn't Love Me" (Featuring Mos Def), "Ching Ching (Lovin' You Still)" (her first and only UK top 40 hit to date) and "Drawing Board" (promo only).

The album was nominated for a MOBO award and it was also nominated for the Mercury Music Prize for album of the year.

== Track listing ==
1. "Love Fool"
2. "Drawing Board"
3. "Guess You Didn't Love Me" (Featuring Mos Def)
4. "It's All Good"
5. "Ching Ching (Lovin' You Still)"
6. "Fake"
7. "What Will I Do" (Featuring Blueblood)
8. "Love You For Life"
9. "Deutschland"
10. "Dirty Weekend" (Featuring The Wise Children)
11. "4 Feet Under"
12. "Da Business"
13. "For Life [Reprise]"
14. "Brand New day"

== Singles ==
Name	Released	Recorded	Writer	Producer	Chart position
"Guess You Didn't Love Me"	17 February 2003	Larrabee Sound Studio, North Hollywood, CA. [Mixed]	Warryn "Baby Dubb" Campbell; Joi Campbell; Mos Def.	Warryn "Baby Dubb" Campbell for Nyrraw Entertainment.	#60 (UK)
"Guess You Didn't Love Me" was the debut single from Terri Walker's debut album Untitled. The single was released on 17 February 2003, peaking at #60 in the UK singles charts. Mos Def did not appear in the music video for the single.
"Ching Ching (Lovin' You Still)"	5 May 2003	Larrabee Sound Studio, North Hollywood, CA. [Mixed]	Marc "M2E" Smith; Sylvia Bennett Smith.	Marc "M2E" Smith & Sylvia Bennett Smith for Kakalaka Koffee Productions.	#38 (UK)
"Ching Ching (Lovin' You Still)" was the album's second single from Terri Walker. It was released on 5 May 2003, becoming her first and only top 40 hit to date, peaking at #38 in the UK singles charts.
"Drawing Board"	Promo Only	Larrabee Sound Studio, North Hollywood, CA. [Mixed]	James Yarde; Louise Francis.	James Yarde for WiseChild productions.	Unreleased
"Drawing Board" was a promo single, meaning that it wasn't commercially released. The single did, however have a music video.
