= So80s =

Compilation album series

So80s are a series of compilation albums curated by deejay/production duo Blank & Jones featuring 1980s music. They were released on CD and some in digital formats from 2009 to 2019 and included 24 albums.

== Background ==
Frustrated with finding '80s 12" mixes on CDs, Black and Jones set out on a mission to release '80s 12" compilations of their favourite tunes.

The series had 13 compilation volumes (1–13) of various artists, 2 more compilations of various artists, including So80s presents Formel Eins, So80s Presents ZTT and 10 compilations dedicated to specific artists, including Kajagoogoo, Ultravox, Heaven 17, Billy Idol, Culture Club, Falco,Sandra, Alphaville, Hubert Kah and OMD.

Some of the albums are only sold from the Black and Jones website. In 2016, the physical issues of the first 5 volumes were discontinued as their licenses expired. However, the first 4 volumes are available only in digital format via EMI, which have only EMI artists.

In 2016, a limited edition box set featuring volumes 1-10 was also released.

== Discography ==
=== Various artists ===
- So80s (3 CDs) (2009)
- So80 2 (3 CDs) (2010)
- So80s 3 (3 CDs) (2010)
- So80s 4 (3 CDs) (2011)
- So80s 5 (3 CDs) (2011)
- So80s 6 (3 CDs) (2011)
- So80s 7 (3 CDs) (2012)
- So80s 8 (3 CDs) (2013)
- So80s presents Formel Eins (2013)
- So80s Presents ZTT (A Remixed Obstacle In The Path Of The Obvious) (2014)
- So80s 9 (3 CDs) (2015)
- So80s 10 (3 CDs) (2016)
- So80s 11 (3 CDs) (2018)
- So80s 12 (2 CDs) (2019)
- So80s 13 (2 CDs) (2019)

=== Specific artists ===
- So80s Presents Kajagoogoo (2011)
- So80s Presents Ultravox (2011)
- So80s Presents OMD (2011)
- So80s Presents Heaven 17 (2011)
- So80s Presents Hubert Kah (2011)
- So80s Presents Billy Idol (2012)
- So80s Presents Culture Club (2012)
- So80s Presents Falco (2012)
- So80s Presents Sandra (2012)
- So80s presents Alphaville (2014)
