= Terri Walker =

- Born: Chanelle Gstettenbauer; 14 April 1979 (age 47)
- Origin: Wimbledon, London, England
- Genres: R&B; soul; neo soul; hip hop soul; UK garage
- Occupations: Singer–songwriter; record producer
- Years active: 2000–present
- Labels: Mercury; Def Soul (2002–2005); Dekkor (2005–2007); BluRoc (2009); Truth and Soul Records (2012–2013)
- Website: terriwalker.com

Terri Walker (born Chanelle Gstettenbauer, 14 April 1979) is an English R&B and soul singer-songwriter. Walker has released four albums in the United Kingdom, Untitled, L.O.V.E, I Am and Entitled. She also provided the majority of the vocals for Shanks & Bigfoot's debut album Swings and Roundabouts.

== Biography ==
=== Early life and career ===
Walker was born in the Wimbledon district of London, England to Jamaican parents, but moved to Regensburg, Bavaria, Germany when she was four. She speaks fluent German. In a 2007 interview with Soul Culture, Walker stated: "I love Deutschland, it's moulded me into what I am. I love here [London] too and I came back to go to boarding-school." Walker moved back to the UK permanently to study at the Italia Conti Academy of Theatre Arts in London, which is a performing arts centre of excellence. Here, she began to study and sing opera. She stated: "I started to study opera when I was about 15 and I started to sing it professionally from about 18. It was always a life-long ambition of mine. I think classical training is the best kinda training you can get."

Walker began working on music independently providing vocals for garage artists such as 187 Lockdown and TNT. Walker also provided vocals on the Shanks & Bigfoot album Swings and Roundabouts, most notably on the UK top 20 hit "Sing-A-Long".

During this time, she was introduced to producers James Yarde, Sammy Jay and Amber Rene of Xosa Entertainment. Walker travelled to LA to record some demo tracks and then returned to the UK, continuing her attempts at landing a deal. Receiving her demos from LA, months later, Walker's UK management sent the recordings to labels in the US, who requested to see her. However, due to 9/11, this was delayed. Def Jam were one of the labels to which they had sent Walker's demos and her management contacted their UK offices who signed her to 'Def Soul UK'.

=== Debut album Untitled (2003–04) ===
Walker released her debut album Untitled in 2003 to critical acclaim. In a review from the BBC, Denise Boyd stated that "In Ms Walker we have an artist who can bravely take on the US diva and who may even come out unscathed on the other side. Terri Walker and Untitled can't be pigeon holed. This is not just urban, this is not just R&B, this is music for the soul." The album received further acclaim when it was nominated for the 2003 Mercury Music Prize alongside Walker's nominations for Best R&B Act, UK Act of the Year, Best Album and Best Newcomer at the 2003 MOBO Awards.

Walker's debut single and the first single from Untitled was "Guess You Didn't Love Me", a collaboration with Mos Def, which was released on 17 February 2003. The single debuted and peaked at number 60 on the UK Singles Chart and remains one of Walker's biggest hits to date. Although a collaboration with Mos Def, he did not appear in the song's music video. The second single from the album was "Ching Ching (Lovin' You Still)", which became her biggest hit single to date on the UK Singles Chart, reaching the top 40. Promotion included an appearance on Jools Holland, performing both "Ching Ching" and the album's third single "Drawing Board". Walker states that the album was called Untitled as "It's like when you go to an art gallery and see a piece of work called 'Untitled'. That's how I want people to see my work. I want them to judge for themselves and make up their own minds."

Despite critical acclaim, the album was not a commercial success when it was released on 3 March 2003, peaking at number 118 on the UK Albums Chart, leading Walker's record label to push her into a more commercial direction for second album L.O.V.E.

Walker was also the guest vocalist on the single version of Jaimeson's "Common Ground", the fourth single taken from his album Think on Your Feet. It was released on 24 May 2004. Walker also provided vocals on Lemon Jelly's single "Make Things Right", which peaked at number 33 on the UK Singles Chart.

=== Second album L.O.V.E (2005) ===
Following the critical success of her debut album, Walker released her second studio album L.O.V.E (an acronym for "Love Overcomes Virtually Everything") two years after the release of Untitled on 28 March 2005. During the promotion of Untitled, Walker spoke on her second album, stating "I'm gonna be doing my new album soon. The next one will be a bit more serious. I've grown up since writing some of my original material and I've seen a lot of things that I would like to write and sing about." Upon the release of the album, Walker explained the more commercial direction by stating, "A lot of people didn't really know where to put me, I was 23 but everybody thought I was about 90 the way they were going on!". Producers that worked with Walker on the album included Soulpower and Copenhaniacs.

Reviews for L.O.V.E were also positive with the Daily Mirror stating that "The opening track confidently predicts that This Is My Time and, with a voice that knocks competitors into the underachieving box and songs a cut above her substandard debut, Ms T is in the ascendant. Pop soul sweetness." Contactmusic.com gave the album 4/5 stars, explaining that "Terri's second album, picks up from where her debut album left off, but there is a different a huge step up in the quality of production... The lyrics, production and vocal performance are all jaw dropping. If you are 29 or younger view this as the female Lemar if you are over 30 be prepared to be shocked and have your breath taken away cause this album is something special, very special."

The first single from the album was "Whoopsie Daisy", produced by Remee and Cutfather & Joe. The song missed the UK Top 40 by one place, peaking at number 41. The second single was "This Is My Time" which featured a sample of Dynasty's "Adventures in the Land of Music" but the song was not commercially released, even though a music video was produced for the song. Despite a more mainstream direction, L.O.V.E performed worse on the UK Albums Chart than its predecessor, peaking at number 142. This lack of commercial success lead to Walker parting with Mercury Records and recording her third studio album independently. Speaking on her departure from the label in an interview with Catch a Vibe, Walker explained "When I got dropped from Mercury I was really annoyed and pissed off because aside from getting dropped I wasn't being 100% me. I had to play the game and do the whole weave thing because that's what the label thought would sell but then obviously it didn't. It was a double whammy because you're getting dropped but you're getting dropped with something that you did to compromise, to try and make things work. If I'd been dropped after the first album I'd have been like, 'Oh well, I like the album. Moving on.' The second one left a bad taste in my mouth. But I got over it."

=== Third album I Am and hiatus from music (2006) ===
Walker released her third studio album in 2006, only one year after leaving her major label home. It was released via independent label Dekkor Records. Walker stated that "Dekkor gives creative control and freedom of expression, much better than being on a major label where you have to watch what you say." and that it's a "progression from the last two albums. Live instruments, songs about life, love and friendships, with the neo-soul vibe still in tact".[sic] Walker co-wrote eight of the ten tracks on the album and also co-produced the album track "I Don't Care". The album predominantly featured production by Sammy Jay and James Yarde (who had featured on Walker's debut album Untitled).

The album received positive reviews for Walker's return to her neo-soul roots. Matilda Egere-Cooper of the BBC stated that "Its just as well that Terri Walker has returned to good form with her third LP, as the faux pas that was her second album didn't do much for her cause... This is one heck of an album, putting Terri firmly back in the premier league of UK singers.". Matt Snow of The Guardian gave the album three stars but stated that I Am "sounds good at an intimate, low volume but increasingly thin and flat the louder you hear it. Walker sings beautifully throughout; she may yet make a classic."

Two singles were released from I Am but neither song received a music video. The first and only commercially released single from the album was "Alright with Me", produced by Sammy Jay and Sly. The song was released on 24 April 2006 and contained an unreleased song "If That Was You" as the b-side. The title-track, "I Am" served as the second promotional-only single with an impact date of 14 August 2006. "Alright with Me" and I Am did not chart in the UK, leading to Walker's partnership with the label ending.

Walker toured the album across the UK in September and October 2006 playing in Bristol, Norwich, Rotterdam, Cardiff, Liverpool, Manchester, London and Brighton. Walker subsequently took a break from the music business after the I Am tour was completed.

=== Return to music and fourth album Walk with Me (2008) ===
Prior to the announcement of her fourth album, Walker had been working with producer Salaam Remi on a side-project entitled Champagne Flutes. In 2008, the duo's song "Hey Baby" was featured on the Sex and the City, Vol. 2: More Music soundtrack. During her time away from the spotlight, Walker also provided backing vocals for Jennifer Hudson and Fergie. She explained that "I wasn't really thinking about coming back with another album because I thought, 'You know what? I'm not really trying to do the artist thing anymore. I love to sing but let me just work alongside people." She explained her hiatus from the music industry by saying "If you're an artist doing something else you feel like people aren't really trying to buy into it because these artists have flooded the market so much. It just makes you wonder, 'Why should I bother? No one's going to be interested in what I'm trying to do. I was locked into that industry. When I got out I realized there was a shortage of the kind of music I was making, what the Jill Scott's and Erykah Badu's were making; so I think someone needs to come back and rectify that."

In May 2010, four years after her third album I Am, Walker announced that she was working on her fourth studio album. She confirmed to Soul Culture that she had been working with producer Ski Beatz, that it would be released on Damon Dash's BluRoc imprint and distributed via Roc-A-Fella Records. Speaking on the album Walker stated, "I have no release date confirmed yet but I can tell you the theme: seeing as I am working with Hip Hop legends, I have decided to have a Hip Hop theme on this album. I want to have a lot of up and coming features on this album – US and UK – and whoever fits what I’m doing. So far it has all fit into place. I’m going to be distributed through Roc-A-Fella which means more freedom for me." The interview also unveiled a clip of the first new material from the album and the original first single choice "Understanding". It was then previewed in full on 7 June 2010. On 6 December, Walker announced on her Twitter page that the album's first single would be titled "So Hard" and that she had seen the first draft of the song's video, her first video since "This Is My Time" in 2005.

On 5 January 2011, Walker posted a fourteen-minute video on YouTube of her talking about the album and introducing album snippets. It was also announced via Soul Culture that the title of the album would be Mz Walker. "So Hard" premiered on Ronnie Herel's BBC 1Xtra show on 18 January. On Herel's show, it was announced that the "So Hard" single release date would be 22 February, with the Mz Walker album following on 3 May. "So Hard" was subsequently released on 5 April 2011 and Walker announced on her blog one day previous, that the album name had been changed to Walk with Me. Subsequently, Walker left BluRoc and the release of both the second single, "One Day Longer" and parent album Walk With Me were cancelled.

=== Lady and debut album Lady (2012-13) ===
In 2012, Walker teamed up with fellow soulstress Nicole Wray to form retro-soul duo Lady. They were signed to Truth and Soul Records and their self-titled debut album was released on 5 March 2013. The album yielded two singles, "Money" and "Get Ready". Several months after the album's release, Walker left the duo to return to her solo career, while Wray continued to perform and tour under the Lady moniker. A third single, "Good Lovin'" was released from the album after Walker had left the band.

=== Untitled to Entitled (2014-15) ===
In 2014, Walker released a collaboration EP with Joe Buhdah, called Untitled to Entitled as a nod to her debut album and upcoming fourth studio album. One single was released in promotion of the EP, "Feel Right". On 1 December 2014, it was announced that Walker's fourth solo album, her first in nine years, Entitled, would be released on 9 March 2015 and the first single would be "Bad Boy" (featuring Frisco).

== Discography ==
=== Studio albums ===
Year	Album details	Peak chart positions
Year	Album details	UK
2003	Untitled: Released: 3 March 2003; Label: Def Soul, Mercury; Formats: CD, 12" vinyl, Digital download	118
2005	L.O.V.E: Released: 28 March 2005; Label: Mercury; Formats: CD, Digital download	142
2006	I Am: Released: 15 May 2006; Label: Dekkor; Formats: CD, Digital download	—
2015	Entitled: Released: 9 March 2015; Label: Terri Walker; Formats: Digital download	—
2023	My Love Story: Released: 14 April 2023; Label: Wings of a Hummingbird Records; Formats: Digital download	—

=== Unreleased albums ===
Year	Album details
2011	Walk with Me: Released: 2011; Label: BluRoc

=== EPs ===
Year	Album details
2014	Joe Buhdha Presents Terri Walker: Untitled to Entitled: Label: Greenmoney Recordings, Can't Stop Won't Stop Records; Formats: Digital download
2019	Joe Buhdha Presents Terri Walker: Breakout: Label: So Real International, Can't Stop Won't Stop Records; Formats: Digital download, 12"

=== Mixtapes ===
- 2011: Terri in Wonderland (released on 10 June 2011)

=== Singles ===
Year	Single	Chart positions	Album
Year	Single	UK	Album
2003	"Guess You Didn't Love Me" (featuring Mos Def)	60	Untitled
2003	"Ching Ching (Lovin' You Still)"	38	Untitled
2003	"Drawing Board"	—	Untitled
2005	"Whoopsie Daisy"	41	L.O.V.E
2005	"This Is My Time"	—	L.O.V.E
2006	"Alright with Me"	—	I Am
2006	"I Am"	—	I Am
2011	"So Hard"	—	Non-album singles
2013	"He Loves Me"	—	Non-album singles
2014	"Feel Right" (Joe Buhdha Presents Terri Walker)	—	Joe Buhdha Presents Terri Walker: Untitled to Entitled EP
2015	"Bad Boy" (featuring Frisco)	—	Entitled
2015	"Already Told Ya"	—	Entitled
2015	"Open Your Mind"	—	Entitled
2016	"Feel It In the Water"	—	Entitled
2016	"Lose Twice" (solo or featuring The Floacist)	—	Entitled
2018	"Breakout" (solo or featuring Rodney P)	—	Joe Buhdha Presents Terri Walker: Breakout
2019	"OK" (solo or featuring Ty)	—	Joe Buhdha Presents Terri Walker: Breakout
2019	"Can't Tell Me Anything" (solo or featuring Children of Zeus)	—	Joe Buhdha Presents Terri Walker: Breakout
2022	"No Good Man"	—	Celebrating Nina: A Reggae Tribute to Nina Simone
2022	"Sugarcane & Lime" (with Melonyx & Zed Bias featuring Rampage Sound)	—	Non-album single
2023	"Finally Over You"	—	My Love Story
2023	"I'm Not The One"	—	My Love Story

==== Single appearances ====
Year	Single	Chart positions	Album
Year	Single	UK	Album
2000	"Sing-A-Long" (Shanks & Bigfoot featuring Terri Walker)	12	Swings & Roundabouts
2004	"Common Ground" (Jaimeson featuring Terri Walker)	191	Think on Your Feet
2004	"Make Things Right" (Lemon Jelly featuring Terri Walker)	33	'64–'95
2006	"Flirtin'" (Emmanuel featuring Terri Walker and Rodney P)	—	D'Illusions of Grandeur
2008	"Love at First Sight" (Diamond featuring Terri Walker)	—	TBR
2010	"Be My Baby" (Haggstrom featuring Terri Walker)	—	Be My Baby EP
2010	"Heartbeat" (T.Williams featuring Terri Walker)	—	Heartbeat EP
2010	"Last Call" (Belle Vue featuring Terri Walker)	—	Last Call (single)
2011	"When Angels Sing" (Donae'o featuring Terri Walker)	—	When Angels Sing EP
2011	"Twilight" (Jozif featuring Terri Walker)	—	Twilight EP
2012	"Fanti Love Song (Remix)" (M3nsa featuring Terri Walker)	—	No. 1 Mango Street
2012	"Light In The Dark" (SpectraSoul featuring Terri Walker)	—	Delay No More
2012	"Here with You" (The Layabouts featuring Terri Walker)	—	Here with You (single)
2012	"Feels Good" (Greenmoney featuring Terri Walker)	—	Feels Good EP
2013	"Missing You" (Artful & Ridney featuring Terri Walker)	—	Missing You EP
2013	"Cold" (Roni Size Remix) (Swindle featuring Terri Walker)	—	Non-album single
2014	"Tension" (Mike Delinquent Project featuring Terri Walker)	—	Tension EP
2021	"Find A Way, Never Again" (Rodney P featuring Terri Walker)	—	Non-album single
