= L.O.V.E (Terri Walker album) =

Studio album by Terri Walker
- Released: 28 March 2005
- Length: 46:00
- Label: Mercury
- Producer: Terri Walker; Matt Jagger; Elias Christidis

Terri Walker chronology
Untitled (2003)	L.O.V.E (2005)	I Am (2006)

L.O.V.E (short for Love Overcomes Virtually Everything) is the second studio album by English R&B singer Terri Walker. It was released on 28 March 2005 by Mercury Records and opened and peaked at number 25 on the UK R&B Albums Chart. L.O.V.E spawned two singles, "Whoopsie Daisy", which just missed out on a UK top 40 chart placing and "This Is My Time", which was cancelled just before the release date.

== Promotion ==
"Whoopsie Daisy" was the first and only single from L.O.V.E. The song was released on 14 March 2005, missing out on the UK Singles Chart's top 40 buy one place, peaking at number 41. "This Is My Time" was the planned second single from the album. The song was originally due for release on 20 June 2005 but was put back until 11 July. However, the single's release was ultimatiely cancelled just before the release date due to lack of promotion, airplay and videoplay.

== Critical reception ==
Professional ratings
Review scores
Source	Rating
The Guardian	2/5 stars

The Daily Mirror called it "a cut above her substandard debut," and praised Walker's voice as one that "knocks competitors into the underachieving box." David Pescheck from The Guardian criticizes L.O.V.E as "slick, punchy but predictable," arguing it caters to "a much broader audience" at the expense of originality. While noting "Walker has a fine voice," he said it no longer "swing[s] and soar[s]," and that her debut's "charming idiosyncracies" are replaced by "drearily" conventional lyrics and production that "frequently grates." He concluded that although her talent may exceed the album, her label seems "intent on blocking any chance of finding out." Hot Press critic Phil Udell argued that L.O.V.E. "plays it disappointingly safe," relying on "over familiar, uninspiring R&B" rather than showcasing individuality. While he noted Walker's "undoubted talent," he contended there is "little to make her stand out."

== Commercial performance ==
L.O.V.E failed to reached the UK Albums Chart, but opened and peaked at number 25 on the UK R&B Albums Chart.

== Track listing ==
This Is My Time track listing
No.	Title	Writer(s)	Producer(s)	Length
1.	"This Is My Time"	Terri Walker; Andy Love; Jos Jorgensen; Kevin Spencer; Richard Randolph; Ricky Smith	Cutfather & Joe; Jorgensen^{[a]}	3:43
2.	"L.O.V.E"	Walker; Daniel Muschinsky; Jens Lomholt; Louis Winding; Philip Dencker	Copenhaniacs	4:10
3.	"Whoopsie Daisy"	Walker; Belle Humble; Joe Belmaati; Mich Hansen; Remee	Cutfather & Joe	3:22
4.	"Hurt by Love"	Walker; Love; Jorgensen	Cutfather & Joe; Love^{[a]}; Jorgensen^{[a]}	3:23
5.	"What the Hell"	Belmaati; Hansen; Robbie Nevil	Cutfather & Joe	3:50
6.	"Slow It Up"	Walker; Karsten Dahlgaard; Mike Hamilton; Peter Biker	Delgado; Biker	3:50
7.	"Star"	Walker; Donald McLean; Lucas Secon; Mary Ann Morgan	Secon; Don-E^{[a]}	3:26
8.	"Ain't No Love"	Walker; Tom Nichols; Belmaati; Hansen; Remee; Alvertis Isbell; Booker T. Jones; Eddie Floyd	Cutfather & Joe	3:54
9.	"The Woman You Want"	Walker; Winding; Nina Woodford	Maximum Risk	4:07
10.	"The One That Got Away"	Walker; Dahlgaard; Hamilton; Biker	Delgado; Biker	4:10
11.	"Feel Love"	Walker; Lomholt; Woodford; Dencker	Copenhaniacs; Woodford	4:19
12.	"Yes I Do"	Walker; Belmaati; Hansen; Woodford	Cutfather & Joe	3:36
Total length:				46:00

Notes

- ^{^[a]} signifies co-producer(s)

Sample credits

- "This Is My Time" incorporates elements of "Adventures in the Land of Music" as performed by Dynasty.
- "Ain't No Love" contains elements of "I've Never Found Me a Girl (To Love Me Like You Do)" as performned by Eddie Floyd.

== Charts ==
Weekly chart performance for L.O.V.E
Chart (2005)	Peak position
UK R&B Albums (Official Charts)	25
