= Swings and Roundabouts =

Studio album by Shanks & Bigfoot
- Released: 31 July 2000
- Recorded: 1998–2000
- Genre: UK garage, dance, R&B
- Label: Jive, Pepper Records
- Producer: Steven Meade, Danny Langsman

Shanks & Bigfoot chronology
Swings and Roundabouts (2000)	Ayia Napa – The Album (2000)

Singles from Swings and Roundabouts
- 1. "Sweet Like Chocolate" Released: 17 May 1999; 2. "Sing-A-Long" Released: 17 July 2000

Professional ratings
Review scores
Source	Rating
The Encyclopedia of Popular Music	3/5 stars
NME	3/5 stars
The Times	4/10

Swings and Roundabouts is the only album by the British dance music duo Shanks & Bigfoot, released on 31 July 2000. The album contains the 1999 hit single "Sweet Like Chocolate", which reached No. 1 in the UK as well as being a top 10 hit in Australia and New Zealand. Despite the success of its two singles, the album failed to break the top 75 of the UK Albums Chart.

Released a year after the runaway success of "Sweet Like Chocolate", the follow-up single "Sing-A-Long" failed to meet popular expectation, reaching No. 12 on the UK Singles Chart. The majority of the female vocals for the album were provided by Terri Walker.

== Critical reception ==
The Guardian called the album "surprisingly palatable", writing that the duo "offer amiable kid's-party fare, now and then sneaking out a great pop song such as 'Like You'." The Scotsman wrote that "Walker's vocals are clear, vivid pop treats, but the album as a whole is so obviously directed at the commercial rewards of a string of top-ten hits that it loses all credibility."

== Track listing ==
All songs written by Steven Meade and Danny Langsman.

1. "Sing-A-Long" – 3:31
2. "Spinning Wheel" – 3:24
3. "Five Miles Wide" – 3:22
4. "Sweet Like Chocolate" – 3:37
5. "King of Winter" – 3:32
6. "Like You" – 4:02
7. "Flower Without You" – 3:23
8. "Our Way" – 3:43
9. "Step to My Beat" – 4:56
10. "Trust in Me" – 4:04

=== Bonus tracks ===
11. "Sing-A-Long" (Wideboys vocal remix) – 4:45
12. "Sweet Like Chocolate" (Metro 7" mix) – 3:14
