= Blank & Jones =

German electronic music duo

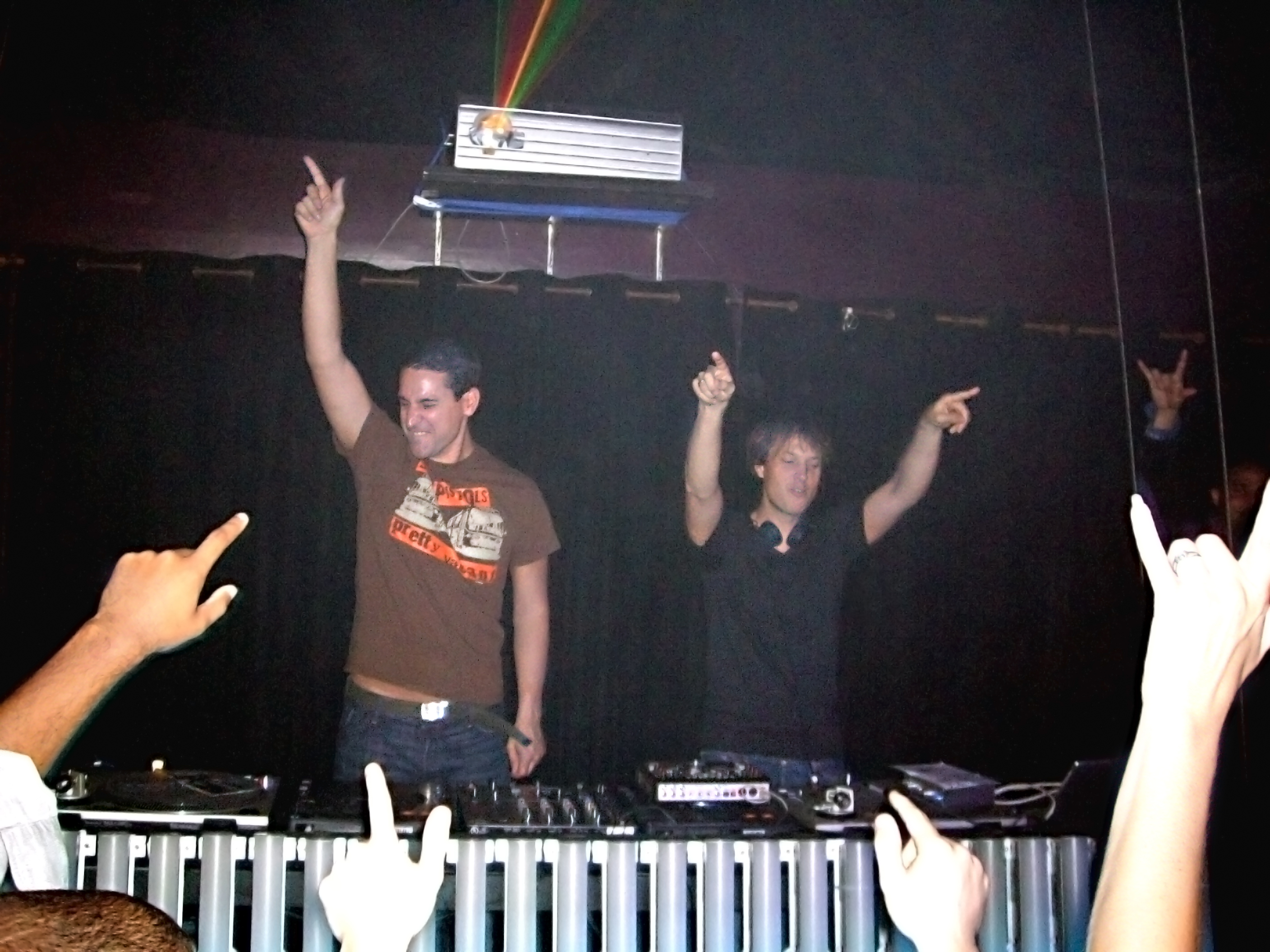
- Performance in Washington D.C., 2006

Background information
- Origin: Cologne, Germany
- Genres: Electronic, trip hop, house, trance, downtempo
- Years active: 1995–present
- Labels: Kontor (current); WEA Records; Edel Music; EMI, Varèse Sarabande
- Members: Jan Pieter Blank (aka Piet Blank); Rene Runge (aka DJ Jaspa Jones)
- Website: blankandjones.com

Blank & Jones are a German electronic music duo, consisting of Jan Pieter Blank (born June 15, 1971), known as Piet Blank; René Runge (born June 27, 1968), better known as DJ Jaspa Jones; and the producer Andy Kaufhold (N*D*K) (born December 17, 1969). They have released twelve albums and more than two dozen singles since their first single release "Sunrise" in 1997.

== History ==
Piet Blank, who became interested in music after purchasing his first record "Kids in America" by Kim Wilde, had his first experience spinning a record on a turntable at age 16. René Runge, who resides in Düsseldorf and who is better known as Jaspa Jones, had his first experience as a DJ at age 19. Together with help from Andy Kaufhold, they formed the trance production team Piet Blank & Jaspa Jones (which would later become simply Blank & Jones) after meeting at the Popkomm music conference.

Even though they had been together for a few years, they did not release their first single, "Sunrise", until 1997. Their first album, In the Mix, was a studio production that came out in 1999. As of 2008, thirteen of their singles have made it into the German top 50, and three into the top 20. Each album made the top 50, including two which reached the top ten.

Blank & Jones have teamed up with Robert Smith from the Cure, Anne Clark, Sarah McLachlan, Claudia Brücken from (Propaganda), Pet Shop Boys, and Delerium. They have also contributed to the Café del Mar compilation series and produced their own chill-out albums, the 15 editions of the Relax series.

They released a single entitled "Miracle Cure" on May 30, 2008, off their studio album The Logic of Pleasure which is a collaboration with New Order's frontman Bernard Sumner. This collaboration was realised with the help of Berlin-based record producer Mark Reeder who is a long term friend of Sumner's. Blank & Jones invited Reeder to remix "Miracle Cure" and this in turn, brought about their collaboration with him and a new project was conceived. This resulted in Reeder completely reworking most of the Blank & Jones vocal tracks for the successful and highly acclaimed 2009 album Reordered.

In 2012, they produced a new album for German singer Sandra titled Stay in Touch.

=== The Singles ===
In 2006, Blank & Jones and their long-standing production colleague Andy Kaufhold collated their finest material on one release, The Singles, which also included two new tracks:

We felt the time had come to put all our singles together on one CD, we preferred to see it as one step along the way, rather than a mere retrospective. A little breather before we moved onto new pastures ... Our aim was to retain the flair of each original track. We wanted them to sound just as they did when we made them, but clearer, in the same way as one restores a painting. You don't paint it from scratch, you just bring out the colours again.

The album was also released in Limited Edition format, in which The Singles are complemented by a DVD, bringing together all Blank & Jones videos on one disc for the first time. The videos feature people such as Estella Warren and Til Schweiger in "Beyond Time", the latter having also directed the clip. The DVD was produced and designed by Thomas Jahn, scriptwriter and director of Knocking on Heaven's Door. The video for the single "Catch" was directed by Conchita Soares and Toni Froschhammer which features TV actress Nadine Warmuth.

=== So80s ===
From 2009 to 2019, they curated a series of compilation albums featuring '80s music called So80s. The series had 24 volumes. In 2011, they curated So80s Presents Kajagoogoo. In 2012, they curated So80s albums featuring Falco and Sandra. In 2014, they curated So80s presents Alphaville.

=== Current and past activities ===
The chart success of Blank & Jones is partially based on their club gigs, radio shows and other live performances including events such as Love Parade, StreetParade and Mayday. The success is further boosted by their activeness as moderators on Eins Live-TV and by being the co-hosts on Viva-Clubrotation.

When asked about the key to their success, their response is:

We do everything digitally, on the basis of Final Scratch, which allows us to use our own edits and mixes, nothing comes straight from tape. Every set we play is unique, not only sound-wise but also in terms of what we play and how we play it. Roughly 60% of our set consists of our own repertoire, as where better to present our own material than via the DJ decks.

Blank & Jones have performed at major festivals and raves in Germany, the Netherlands, Poland and Russia. They have also traveled further afield on a regular basis, to Canada, Mexico, South America and Australia.

Piet Blank is also the host of the Club Mix that is aired on international flights by Lufthansa, where he hosts a two-hour radio show that shows different artists such as Totally Enormous Extinct Dinosaurs and Fritz Kalkbrenner. The show is hosted in German as well as in English.

== Discography ==
=== Albums ===
==== As Blank and Jones ====
- 1999: In da Mix
- 2000: DJ Culture (Limited edition with 2 CDs. Disc 2 includes bonus tracks and The Nightfly video)
- 2001: Nightclubbing (Limited edition with 2 CDs including ambient tracks)
- 2002: Substance (Limited with 2 CDs and bonus tracks)
- 2003: Relax (Limited edition in a different package)
- 2004: Monument (Limited edition with 2 CDs including bonus tracks)
- 2005: Relax Edition 2 (2 CDs) (Limited edition includes bonus tracks)
- 2006: The Singles (Limited edition includes DVD with singles clips and some bonus)
- 2007: Relax Edition 3 (2 CDs)
- 2008: The Logic of Pleasure
- 2009: Relax Edition 4 (2 CDs)
- 2009: Eat Raw for Breakfast
- 2009: Reordered (Blank & Jones, Mark Reeder)
- 2010: Relax Edition 5 (2 CDs)
- 2010: Chilltronica No 2
- 2011: Relax Edition Six
- 2012: Relax Edition Seven
- 2012: Relax-Jazzed (Blank & Jones album in cooperation with Julian and Roman Wasserfuhr)
- 2013: Relax – A Decade 2003–2013 – Remixed & Mixed
- 2013: Relax – The Best of a Decade 2003–2013
- 2014: Relax Edition Eight
- 2015: Relax Edition Nine
- 2016: Milchbar Seaside Season 8
- 2016: DOM
- 2017: #WhatWeDoAtNight
- 2017: Relax Edition 10
- 2017: Chilltronica No.6
- 2018: Milchbar Seaside Season 10
- 2018: Relax Edition 11
- 2020: Milchbar Seaside Season 12
- 2021: Milchbar Seaside Season 13
- 2023: The Best of Relax // 20 Years // 2003 – 2023

==== Production for other artists ====
- 2012: Sandra – Stay in Touch

=== Singles ===
- Sunrise (1997)
- Heartbeat (1998)
- Flying to The Moon (1998)
- Cream (1999) (UK #24 and #1 in Dance Charts)
- After Love (1999) (UK #57)
- The Nightfly (2000) (UK #55)
- DJ Culture (2000)
- Sound of Machines (Released in Italy and Netherlands as Single) (2000)
- Beyond Time (2000) (UK #53)
- DJs, Fans & Freaks (D.F.F.) (2001) (UK #45)
- Nightclubbing (2001)
- Desire (2002) (Germany #10)
- Watching the Waves (2002)
- Suburban Hell (2002) (Released only in Vinyls)
- The Hardest Heart (feat. Anne Clark) (2002) (Germany #2 In EuroHits Charts / UK #3 In British Euroscene Singles / Costa Rica #5 Top 20 Hits Radio / Guatemala #2 Los 10 Más Buscados Radio Infinita )
- A Forest (Feat. Robert Smith) (2003) (Australia #97 )
- Summer Sun (2003) (Released only in Vinyls)
- Mind of the Wonderful (feat. Elles de Graaf) (2004)
- Perfect Silence (feat. Bobo) (2004)
- Revealed (with Steve Kilbey) (2005) (Guatemala #3)
- Catch (Vocals by Elles de Graaf) (2006)
- Sound of Machines 2006 (2006)
- Miracle Cure (2008) (Germany #90)
- California Sunset (2008)
- Where You Belong (feat. Bobo) (2008)
- Relax (Your Mind) (feat. Jason Caesar) (2009)
- Lazy Life (feat. Jason Caesar) (2009)
- Miracle Man (with Cathy Battistessa) (2010)
- Pura Vida (with Jason Caesar) (2011)
- April (2016)

=== Remixes ===
1998

- Basic Connection – Angel (Don't Cry) (Blank & Jones Remix)
- Sash! – La Primavera (Blank & Jones Mix)
- Syntone – Heal My World (Blank & Jones Mix)
- Dario G – Sunmachine (Blank & Jones Mix)
- Humate – Love Stimulation (Blank & Jones Mix)
- United Deejays – Too Much Rain (Blank & Jones vs. Gorgeous Mix)
- Dune – Electric heaven (Blank & Jones Club Cut)
- Yello vs Hardfloor – Vicious Games (Blank & Jones Mix)

1999

- Liquid Love – Sweet Harmony (Blank & Jones Mix)
- Mauro Picotto – Iguana (Blank & Jones Remix)
- Storm – Love is here to stay (Blank & Jones Mix)

2001

- Armin van Buuren pres. Perpetuous Dreamer – The Sound of Goodbye (Blank & Jones Mix)
- Fragma – You are Alive (Blank & Jones Remix)
- Die Ärzte – Rock'n Roll Übermensch (Blank & Jones Mix)

2002

- Pet Shop Boys – Home & Dry (Blank & Jones Dub)
- Pet Shop Boys – Home & Dry (Blank & Jones Mix)

2003

- Pet Shop Boys – Love Comes Quickly (Blank & Jones 2003 mix)
- RMB – Beauty of Simplicity (Blank & Jones Retouch)
- RMB – ReReality (Blank & Jones Remix)
- Wolfsheim – Wundervoll (Blank & Jones Remix)
- Evolution feat. Jayn Hanna – Walking on Fire (Blank & Jones Remix)
- Chicane – Love on the Run (Blank & Jones Dub Remix)
- Chicane – Love on the Run (Blank & Jones Remix)

2004

- Blank & Jones – The Blue Sky (2004 Update)

2006

- Blank & Jones – The Nightfly (WMC 06 Retouch)

2007

- Delerium – Lost & Found (Blank & Jones Radio Mix)
- Delerium – Lost & Found (Blank & Jones Late Night Mix)
- Delerium – Lost & Found (Blank & Jones Electrofied Mix)

2009

- Johnny Hates Jazz – I Don't Want To Be A Hero (Blank & Jones Remix)

2010

- Daniela Katzenberger – "Nothing's Gonna Stop Me Now" (Blank & Jones Club Remix)
- Daniela Katzenberger – "Nothing's Gonna Stop Me Now" (Blank & Jones Radio Edit)
- Daniela Katzenberger – "Nothing's Gonna Stop Me Now" (Blank & Jones Dub)

2011

- Medina – Gutter (Blank & Jones Club Remix)
- Medina – Gutter (Blank & Jones Radio Edit)
- Medina – Gutter (Blank & Jones Dub)

2021

- Blank & Jones – Happy Dreamer (with Laid Back)

=== Compilations and DJ mixes ===
- Trance Mix USA Vol. 2 (2001) (US release)
- The Mix Volume 1 (2 CDs) (2002)
- The Mix Volume 2 (2 CDs) (2003)
- The Mix Volume 3 (2 CDs) (2004)
- Peaktime 5 (2 CDs**) (2005) (Australian release) **CD 2 is the album DJ Culture
- Posh Trance (2008)
- Milchbar Seaside Season, Vol. 02 (2010)
- RMX – Superstars (remixed by Superstars) (2011)

==== So80s series complications ====
- So80s (volumes 1–13) (2009–2019)
- So80s Presents Kajagoogoo (2011)
- So80s Presents Ultravox (2011)
- So80s Presents OMD (2011)
- So80s Presents Heaven 17 (2011)
- So80s Presents Billy Idol (2012)
- So80s Presents Culture Club (2012)
- So80s Presents Falco (2012)
- So80s Presents Sandra (2012)
- So80s Presents Formel Eins (2013)
- So80s Presents ZTT (A Remixed Obstacle in the Path of the Obvious) (2014)
- So80s presents Alphaville (2014)
