= What You Need (Powerhouse song) =

Single by Powerhouse featuring Duane Harden
- Released: May 10, 1999
- Genre: House
- Length: 3:21
- Label: Strictly Rhythm
- Songwriters: Lenny Fontana; Duane Harden
- Producer: Lenny Fontana

Music video
- "What You Need" on YouTube

What You Need is a song by American producer and DJ Powerhouse featuring Duane Harden. It was released in May 1999 as a single and reached number-one on the US Billboard Hot Dance Music/Club Play chart. There was also the first song to be played on Galaxy 105-106. It peaked at #13 on the UK Singles Chart. The track was remixed by Full Intention.

== Content ==
The song sampled Thelma Houston's "I'm Here Again".

== Charts ==
Chart (1999)	Peak position
Belgium (Ultratip Bubbling Under Flanders)	3
Canada Dance (RPM)	5
France (SNEP)	73
Netherlands (Single Top 100)	72
Scotland Singles (Official Charts)	24
UK Singles (Official Charts)	13
UK Dance (Official Charts)	1
US Billboard Hot Dance Club Play	1

== See also ==
- List of number-one dance hits (United States)
- List of artists who reached number one on the US Dance chart
