= Ray Pinky Velazquez =

American sound producer and mixer

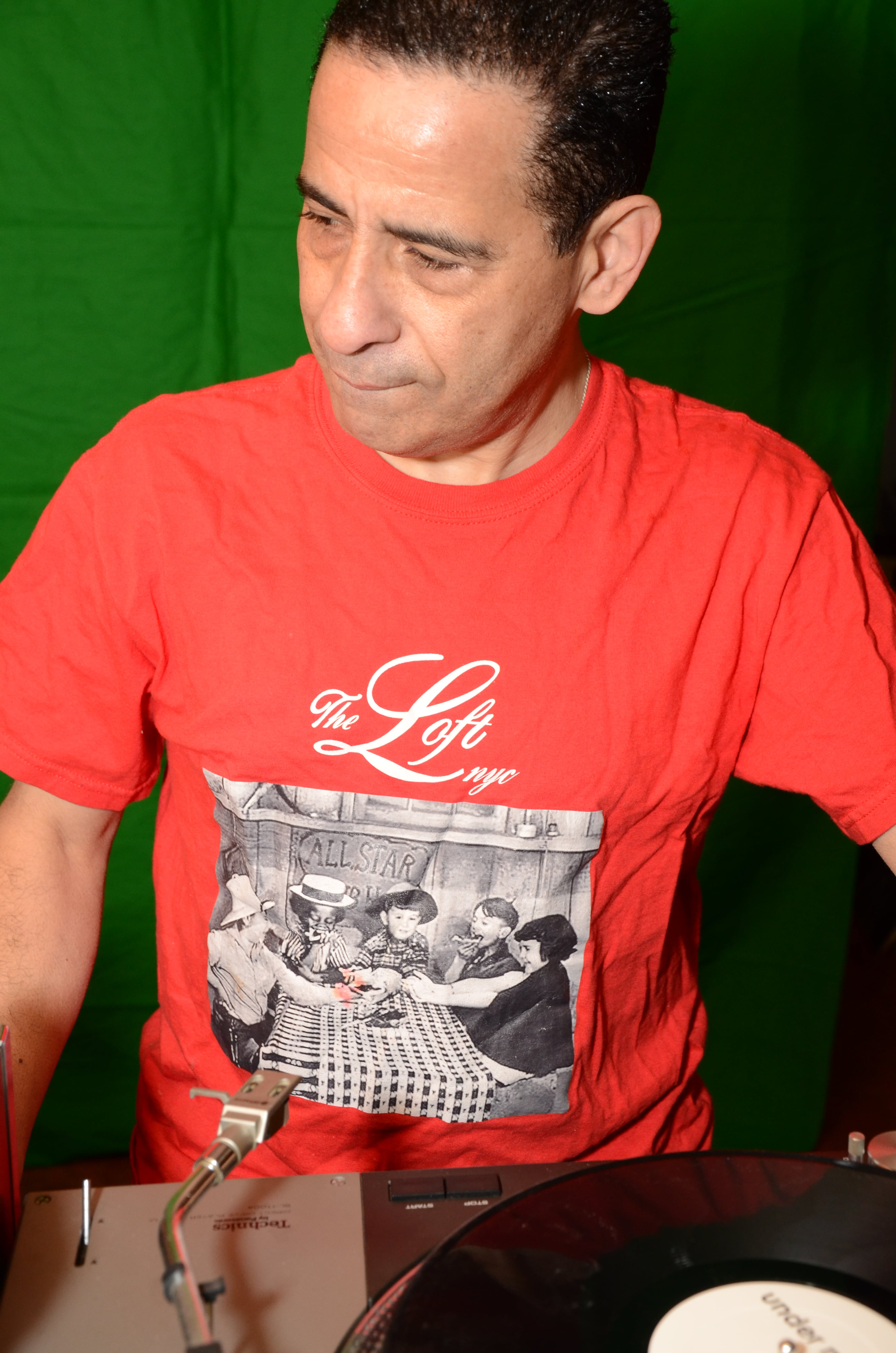
- Born: May 28, 1955 (age 70); Arecibo, Puerto Rico
- Occupations: Sound producer and mixer
- Known for: A&R man and disco consultant for Vanguard Records

'Ray "Pinky" Velazquez (born May 28, 1955) is a Latin-American dance music producer, mixer, and remixer. Velazquez is the co-founder, former Ceo and former vice president of the Legends of Vinyl and is known for tracks including South Central, Disco Not Disco 2, Twilight 22, and Savage Lover. He was the A&R man and disco consultant for the Vanguard Records dance music department. [1][2] He was responsible for the signing and the introduction of Public Enemy into the record business (under the name of Spectrum City) and also produced their first single (Lies/Check out the Radio).

He was the club spinner for the Ipanema Discotheque in the 1970s. Velazquez was also a member of New York City's Rockpool and was the first DJ to win an award for programming progressive in alternative rock at WCCR AM RADIO of the City College New York, New York City.

== Early life and career ==
Ray was born in Arecibo, Puerto Rico and was raised in NY City. From 1979 to 1984 Velazquez was the A&R man and "Disco consultant" for Vanguard. In 1979 Ray was brought on board to help promote and scout for talent. Ray Pinky Velazquez was a popular Billboard magazine club spinner (disc Jockey) known for his tenure with the popular Brazilian nightclub the Ipanema Discotheque and also worked for the nightclub "Cartune Alley". He introduced and produced Spectrum City who later became Public Enemy. Their initial debut single "Lies" backed with "Check Out The Radio" highlighted "Check out the Radio" was a featured track in the 1992 Oliver Stone film titled "South Central". Ray founded and coordinated with Stevie Wonder protege producer Gordon Bahary as both Executive producer and mixer for Twilight 22. "Electric Kingdom"was the group's initial release on Vanguard records. The song peaked at #7 on US R&B Charts. Mr Velazquez mixed Fonda Rae and "Over Like A Fat Rat". The hit track reached #75 on the U.S. R&B charts and #22 on the U.S. club charts. Carol Williams and "Cant Get Away (From your Love") reached #38 on the U.S. club charts and received significant R&B radio play in the U.S. The hit track was mixed by Mr. Velazquez. During the 1980 's D.O.R ( dance oriented rock) invasion Ray "Pinky" started Flip Records, a division of the parent Vanguard records.

== Discography ==
=== Remix ===
Year	Album/Single	Artist(s)	Label
1981	Late Night City	Comateens	Call Me (4)
1981	Ghosts	Comateens	Cachalot Records
1981	Till You Surrender	Rainbow Brown	Vanguard Disco
1982	Over Like A Fat Rat	Fonda Rae	Vanguard
1982	Can’t Get Away (From Your Love)	Carrol Williams	Vanguard
1982	First, Last, For Everything	Endgames	Flip Records
1983	Dance To The Music (Vocal)	Junior Byron	Vanguard
2007	Dance To The Music (Dub Version)	James Murphy, Pat Mahoney	Fabric (2)
2008	Till You Surrender (Special Remix)	Rainbow Brown	Vanguard Records

=== Production ===
Year	Album/Single	Artist/Band	Label
1983	Fourteen Days	Lex	Flip Records
1985	Big Noise	Base	Prism
1985	Cloud Nine	Mystery Assignment	Virgin
1984	Got Me Goin	RealEyes	Vanguard
1986	Too Much Too Soon	Denroy Morgan & The Band of Gold	Sutra Records

=== Technical ===
Year	Album/Single	Artist/Band	Label
1977	Childhood Forever	Recreation-Harmony	Dynamo Record
1979	Boogie Down	Double Feature	Makossa Records
1983	I Love Music	J.T.	Fabric
