= Cream (Blank & Jones song) =

Single by Blank & Jones
- Released: 31 May 1999
- Recorded: Spacedust Studio, Germany
- Genre: Trance
- Length: 7:19
- Label: Deviant
- Songwriters: Andy Kaufhold, Jaspa Jones, Piet Blank
- Producers: Andy Kaufhold, Jaspa Jones, Piet Blank

"Cream" is a 1999 single released by Blank & Jones which reached No. 24 in the UK Charts.

== Single ==
UK & French single

1. "Cream (Extended Version)" - 7:19
2. "Cream (Paul van Dyk Mix)" - 8:15

Australian & Swedish single

1. "Cream (Radio Edit)" - 3:18
2. "Cream (Paul van Dyk Short Cut)" - 3:41
3. "Cream (Long Version)" - 7:20
4. "Cream (ATB Mix)" - 6:11
5. "Cream (Paul van Dyk Mix)" - 8:18

Spanish & German single

- A1
1. "Cream (Paul van Dyk Long Version)" - 8:19
- A2
1. "Cream (Paul van Dyk Short Cut)" - 3:41
- B1
1. "Cream (ATB Mix)" - 6:10
- B2
1. "Cream (Long Version)" - 7:20

== Charts ==
=== Weekly charts ===
Chart (1999)	Peak position
UK Singles (OCC)	24
UK Dance (OCC)	1

=== Year-end charts ===
1999 year-end chart performance for "Cream"
Chart (1999)	Position
UK Club Chart (Music Week)	6
