= Nightclubbing (Blank & Jones album) =

Studio album by Blank & Jones
- Released: 2001
- Genre: Trance
- Label: Gang Go Music, Edel
- Producer: Andy Kaufhold (N*D*K)

Blank & Jones chronology
DJ Culture (2000)	Nightclubbing (2001)	Substance (2002)

Nightclubbing is the third studio album by Trance duo Blank & Jones. It was released in 2001.

In 2012 it was awarded a gold certification from the Independent Music Companies Association which indicated sales of at least 75,000 copies throughout Europe.

== Track listing ==
1. "Invocatio" – 1:43
2. "Beyond Time" – 7:03
3. "DJs, Fans & Freaks" – 5:01
4. "Nightclubbing" – 5:29
5. "Le Grand Bleu" – 4:34
6. "Fragile" – 5:27
7. "Tribal Attack" – 4:36
8. "Electric Circus" – 6:08
9. "Darkness" – 5:59
10. "Sweet Revenge" – 5:19
11. "Heaven (Can Wait)" – 5:23
12. "Secrets & Lies" – 6:36
