= Straight from the Heart (Doolally song) =

- 1999 re-release artwork

Single by Doolally
- Released: 1998
- Genre: UK garage
- Length: 3:36
- Label: Chocolate Boy, Locked On, XL
- Songwriters: Danny Langsman, Steven Meade
- Producer: Doolally

Shanks & Bigfoot singles chronology
"Straight from the Heart" (1998)	"Sweet like Chocolate" (1999)

"Straight from the Heart" is a song by UK garage duo Doolally, later known as Shanks & Bigfoot, with vocals provided by Sharon Woolf. The song was first released in 1998 as the duo's debut single and reached the top 20 in the United Kingdom, peaking at No. 20. After the success of their UK number-one single "Sweet Like Chocolate" the following year, "Straight from the Heart" was re-released and peaked at No. 9 on the UK Singles Chart. The song also reached No. 1 on the UK Dance Singles Chart in both 1998 and 1999.

In 2018, the House & Garage Orchestra featuring Shelley Nelson on vocals recorded an orchestral version for the UK garage covers album Garage Classics.

== Track listings ==
UK 12-inch single (1998)

A1. "Straight from the Heart" (club mix) – 6:30
A2. "Straight from the Heart" (Crazy Bank mix) – 5:56
B1. "Straight from the Heart" (Funkforce vocal mix) – 7:03

UK CD single (1999)

1. "Straight from the Heart" (radio edit) – 3:36
2. "Straight from the Heart" (Tuff Jam remix) – 6:10
3. "Straight from the Heart" (Bump & Flex mix) – 5:48

== Charts ==
=== Weekly charts ===
Chart (1998)	Peak position
Scotland Singles (Official Charts)	91
UK Singles (Official Charts)	20
UK Dance (Official Charts)	1

Chart (1999)	Peak position
Scotland Singles (Official Charts)	47
UK Singles (Official Charts)	9
UK Dance (Official Charts)	1
UK Indie (Official Charts)	1

=== Year-end charts ===
Chart (1999)	Position
UK Singles (OCC)	167
