= Duane Harden =

American singer

- Born: August 5, 1971 (age 55); Würzburg, West Germany
- Origin: Savannah, Georgia, U.S.
- Genres: House, soul
- Occupations: Singer, songwriter
- Instrument: Vocals
- Years active: 1998–present

Duane Harden (born August 5, 1971) is a German-born American dance music vocalist and songwriter who has sung on several hits by various producers.

Harden sung on two dance singles in 1999: "You Don't Know Me" with Armand Van Helden and "What You Need" with Powerhouse. The former song topped the UK Singles Chart in January 1999.

== Musical career ==
He started producing music in 1997 when he teamed up with Moises Modesto to form MODU Productions. Harden's first project as a co-producer and songwriter of "The Love That I Once Knew", was for Tekitha Washington.

Harden's first track was "Don't You Ever Give Up", released as Innervision feat. Melonie Daniels, produced by MODU and released in 1998 by Frankie Feliciano's label Ricanstruction. In 1999 he had two major dance hits: he sang on "You Don't Know Me", a track by Armand Van Helden that peaked at number two on the Billboard Hot Dance Music/Club Play, and topped the charts in the United Kingdom. It is this song for which he is best known. Later in the year, Harden hit #1 on the Hot Dance Music chart with "What You Need", a song credited to Powerhouse featuring Duane Harden, produced by Lenny Fontana. In 2000 he climbed to number nineteen with the hit "Sunshine (Dance With You)", a track credited to Infinity featuring Duane Harden, produced by John Kano.

As a songwriter, Harden has written "Believe" for Ministers De La Funk with Jocelyn Brown on vocals, "Stop Playing With My Mind" for Barbara Tucker, and "Pow Pow Pow" for Lenny Fontana with Darryl D'Bonneau on vocals, all between 1999 and 2000. He also sang to Chicane's song "One More Time". In 2010, Harden has also worked with Ministers De La Funk on a single called "I Feel Love".

== See also ==
- List of number-one dance hits (United States)
- List of artists who reached number one on the US Dance chart
