= Shanks & Bigfoot =

British music duo

- Also known as: Doolally
- Origin: United Kingdom
- Genres: UK garage; dance; R&B
- Years active: 1998–2001
- Label: Jive
- Past members: Steven Meade; Danny Langsman

Shanks & Bigfoot were a British duo of UK garage producers Steven Meade and Danny Langsman, known principally for their single "Sweet like Chocolate", which topped the UK Singles Chart in 1999. They were originally known as Doolally, recording the pirate anthem "Straight from the Heart" under this name in 1998. Upon its first release, "Straight from the Heart" peaked at number twenty on the UK chart. It was subsequently re-released in 1999 on the back of their chart success with "Sweet Like Chocolate", and reached number nine on the chart.

== Success ==
The single "Sweet Like Chocolate" was a success even before its commercial release, receiving months of club play before debuting at number one on the UK Singles Chart, where it remained for two weeks. Much to the surprise of the duo, the song became one of the most popular singles of the late 1990s. The single went on to become Britain's eighth-biggest selling single of 1999.

"We think it must have captured people's imaginations somehow", said Shanks in an interview. "I don't think you ever think 'this is a big record' when you make one... it was something that just happened." Vocals on the track were sung by Sharon Woolf, who also sung "Straight from the Heart" for them the year before.

The video for "Sweet Like Chocolate" was computer-animated and popular at the time. It featured a girl walking along in an area where almost everything is made of chocolate. The video was created by Visualisation Services Ltd (Darren Lee) and was nominated for a BRIT and a MOBO in 1999, but failed to win on either occasion.

== Aftermath ==
At the annual MOBO Awards in 1999, Shanks & Bigfoot received three nominations and won one, for Best British Dance Act, beating out Fatboy Slim, Armand van Helden and Phats & Small. Additionally, they were nominated for two Ivor Novello Awards and two BRITs. A bidding war for Shanks & Bigfoot soon resulted, with the duo eventually signing to Zomba Records. They were also in hot demand as songwriters, with Britney Spears asking them to write for her, as well as Beyoncé and Destiny's Child reporting in the now-defunct Ministry magazine, that they loved the record and had taken copies of "Sweet Like Chocolate" back to the US where it was never released. However, it would later show up in a compilation album that was released Stateside by Epic in 2001.

In late 1999, the duo remixed Jamiroquai's song "Canned Heat" as a B-side for their "King for a Day" single.

In 2000, they released their debut and only album Swings and Roundabouts along with the follow-up single to "Sweet Like Chocolate", "Sing-A-Long", which failed to match the commercial success of "Sweet Like Chocolate", peaking at No. 12. English soul singer Terri Walker, an unknown at the time, provided vocals for all of the album except for "Sweet Like Chocolate". In the same year, they also mixed a Ministry of Sound compilation entitled Ayia Napa – The Album.

== Discography ==
=== Albums ===
- Swings and Roundabouts (2000)
- Ayia Napa – The Album (compilation) (2000)

=== Singles ===
List of singles, with selected chart positions and certifications, showing year released and album name
Title	Year	Peak chart positions										Certifications	Album
Title	Year	UK	UK Dance	AUS	BEL (FL)	GER	IRE	NL	NZ	SWE	SWI	Certifications	Album
"Straight from the Heart" (as Doolally)	1998	20	1	—	—	—	—	—	—	—	—		Non-album singles
The EP	1998	—	—	—	—	—	—	—	—	—	—		Non-album singles
"Sweet Like Chocolate"	1999	1	1	6	42	22	9	24	9	25	32	BPI: Platinum; ARIA: Platinum; RMNZ: Gold	Swings and Roundabouts
"Straight from the Heart" (re-release)	1999	9	1	—	—	—	—	—	—	—	—		Non-album singles
"Watch This Space" (as Doolally)	2000	—	—	—	—	—	—	—	—	—	—		Non-album singles
"Sing-A-Long"	2000	12	1	84	—	—	—	—	—	—	—		Swings and Roundabouts
"Trust in Me"	2001	—	—	—	—	—	—	—	—	—	—		Swings and Roundabouts
"—" denotes a recording that did not chart or was not released in that territory.

=== Remixes ===
- "R.U. Ready" (Shanks & Bigfoot Mix) – Sharon Woolf (1999)
  - released on 12" as a promo
- "Will You Wait for Me" (Doolally Vocal Mix + Shanks & Bigfoot Dub) – Kavana (1999)
- "Boost Dem" (Doolally Mix) – Kitachi (1999)
- "Canned Heat" (Shanks & Bigfoot Extended Master Mix) – Jamiroquai (2000)
  - released on "King for a Day" single
