= Sweet like Chocolate =

1999 single by Shanks & Bigfoot

Single by Shanks & Bigfoot

from the album Swings and Roundabouts
- Released: 17 May 1999
- Studio: Soul II Soul (London, England)
- Genre: UK garage
- Length: 3:37
- Label: Jive; Pepper; Chocolate Boy
- Songwriters: Danny Langsman; Steven Meade
- Producers: Shanks & Bigfoot

Shanks & Bigfoot singles chronology
"Straight from the Heart" (1998)	"Sweet like Chocolate" (1999)	"Straight from the Heart" (1999)

"Sweet like Chocolate" is a song by British garage music duo Shanks & Bigfoot with vocalist Sharon Woolf. It was released as a single on 17 May 1999 and was included on the duo's debut album, Swings and Roundabouts (2000). Vocals on the track are sung by Sharon Woolf, who had also sung on their track "Straight from the Heart", which was released under their previous band name, Doolally.

== Background ==
"Sweet like Chocolate" was originally released on vinyl in 1998 as a promotional single, which had a short-run pressing of 1,000 copies. By January 1999, "Sweet Like Chocolate" was already a KISS FM priority track and "at the centre of a bidding war". When released as an official single four months later, it topped the UK Singles Chart for two weeks and reached the top 10 in Australia, Ireland, and New Zealand. The song was the first UK garage track to hit number one on the UK Singles Chart. In 2019, The Guardian listed the song at number 20 in their list of "The Best UK Garage Tracks".

== Chart performance ==
"Sweet like Chocolate" topped the UK Singles Chart for two weeks in May 1999, selling 251,000 copies during its first week and 142,000 copies during its second week. It achieved platinum status in the UK and was the country's eighth biggest-selling single of 1999. It was the first song to simultaneously top the UK Singles, Dance, R&B, and Indie charts. Internationally, the song was a top-10 hit in Ireland, Australia, and New Zealand; in the latter two countries, the song was certified platinum and gold, respectively. It also charted in Flanders, Germany, the Netherlands, Sweden, and Switzerland. In Canada, the song peaked at number 14 on the RPM Dance 30 chart in September 1999.

== Music video ==
A music video, which is animated, was produced for the song by graphic designers "Visualisation Services". It is set in a surreal world where every object, except for the protagonist, is constructed out of chocolate.

== Track listings ==
UK CD single

1. "Sweet like Chocolate" (Shanks & Bigfoot radio edit) – 3:28
2. "Sweet like Chocolate" (Metro 7-inch remix) – 3:13
3. "Sweet like Chocolate" (Shanks & Bigfoot original mix) – 6:55
4. "Sweet like Chocolate" (Ruff Driverz vocal) – 5:46

UK 12-inch single

A. "Sweet like Chocolate" (Shanks & Bigfoot original mix) – 6:55
B. "Sweet like Chocolate" (Ruff Driverz vocal) – 5:46

UK cassette single

1. "Sweet like Chocolate" (Shanks & Bigfoot radio edit) – 3:28
2. "Sweet like Chocolate" (Ruff Driverz vocal) – 5:46

European CD single

1. "Sweet like Chocolate" (Metro 7-inch remix) – 3:13
2. "Sweet like Chocolate" (Shanks & Bigfoot radio edit) – 3:28

Australasian CD single

1. "Sweet like Chocolate" (Metro 7-inch remix) – 3:13
2. "Sweet like Chocolate" (Shanks & Bigfoot radio edit) – 3:28
3. "Sweet like Chocolate" (Shanks & Bigfoot original mix) – 6:55
4. "Sweet like Chocolate" (Ruff Driverz vocal) – 5:46

== Credits and personnel ==
Credits are adapted from the UK CD single liner notes.

Studios

- Recorded at Soul II Soul Studios (London, England)
- Mastered at Battery Studios (London, England)

Personnel

- Shanks & Bigfoot – production
  - Danny Langsman – writing
  - Steven Meade – writing
- Sharon Woolf – vocals, backing vocals
- David Newell – engineering
- Streaky Gee – mastering

== Charts ==
=== Weekly charts ===
Chart (1999)	Peak position
Australia (ARIA)	6
Belgium (Ultratop 50 Flanders)	42
Canada Dance/Urban (RPM)	14
Europe (Eurochart Hot 100)	10
Germany (GfK)	22
Iceland (Íslenski Listinn Topp 40)	28
Ireland (IRMA)	9
Netherlands (Dutch Top 40)	22
Netherlands (Single Top 100)	24
New Zealand (Recorded Music NZ)	9
Scottish Singles Sales (Official Charts)	6
Sweden (Sverigetopplistan)	25
Switzerland (Schweizer Hitparade)	32
UK Singles (Official Charts)	1
UK Dance (Official Charts)	1
UK Hip Hop/R&B (Official Charts)	1
UK Indie (Official Charts)	1

=== Year-end charts ===
Chart (1999)	Position
Australia (ARIA)	46
Netherlands (Dutch Top 40)	157
New Zealand (RIANZ)	22
UK Singles (OCC)	8

== Certifications ==
Region	Certification	Certified units/sales
Australia (ARIA)	Platinum	70,000^{^}
New Zealand (RMNZ)	Gold	5,000^{*}
United Kingdom (BPI)	Platinum	707,000
^{*} Sales figures based on certification alone.^{^} Shipments figures based on certification alone.

== Cover versions ==
In 2016, English singer Tulisa interpolated the chorus of "Sweet like Chocolate" in her song of the same name which features English rapper Akelle.

A reggae version by Hollie Cook reached No. 41 on the UK Physical Singles Chart in November 2018.

In 2019, DJ Spoony and Lily Allen recorded their version for the UK garage orchestral covers album Garage Classical.
