= Sofia Richie =

American model and media personality (born 1998)

Sofia Richie Grainge
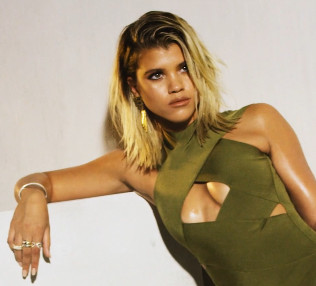
- Richie at a photoshoot in 2017
- Born: Sofia Alexandra Richie; August 24, 1998 (age 28); Los Angeles, California, U.S.
- Occupations: Social media personality; model; fashion designer
- Years active: 2012–present
- Spouse: Elliot Grainge (m. 2023)
- Children: 2
- Parent: Lionel Richie (father)
- Relatives: Miles Richie (brother); Sir Lucian Grainge (father-in-law)
- Modeling information
- Height: 5 ft 6 in (1.68 m)
- Eye color: Hazel
- Agency: Select Model Management (London)

Sofia Alexandra Richie Grainge (née Richie; born August 24, 1998) is an American social media personality and model. She has been featured in campaigns by a number of major brands including Stuart Weitzman, Tommy Hilfiger, Michael Kors, and Adidas. She is the daughter of singer Lionel Richie and younger sister of Miles Richie.

== Early life ==
Sofia Alexandra Richie was born on August 24, 1998, in Los Angeles, California, the daughter of musician Lionel Richie and his second wife Diane Alexander. She has an older brother, Miles Brockman Richie (born May 27, 1994). Sofia Richie's godfather was singer Michael Jackson. She reported that her visits to Jackson's Neverland Ranch were some of her favorite memories as a child, and she became close friends with his daughter, Paris.

Richie grew up with an affinity for music like her father. She learned to sing at age five and play the piano at age seven. She made occasional appearances at her father's shows and took vocal lessons from vocal coach Tim Carter when she was 14. She also worked in the studio with her brother-in-law, Good Charlotte lead vocalist Joel Madden. However, she decided to move away from a music career because of the pressure of living up to her father's stature in the music industry. She made several appearances in reality television series

Richie spent some time at Oaks Christian School before being educated at home for several years while her father was on tour. She played soccer until age 16 when she broke her hip in a Segway accident.

== Career ==
=== Modeling ===
Richie began modeling at age 14 with a feature in Teen Vogue and at 15 she got her first fashion contract with Los Angeles–based swimwear company Mary Grace Swim. The next year, Richie signed with London-based modeling agency Select Model Management. In 2014, Richie was featured on Who What Wear and NationAlist Magazine, and teamed up with Teen Vogue and Olay for that year's "Fresh to School" online campaign. In early 2015, she appeared in editorials for Elle Girl, Nylon, Dazed, Fault, Unleash'd and Love Culture.

She made her runway debut in February 2016 at the American Heart Association's Go Red For Women Red Dress Collection fashion show during New York Fashion Week. Richie has since walked the runway for Chanel, Jeremy Scott, Philipp Plein, Kanye West's Yeezy line, Samantha Thavasa and Dolce & Gabbana. Richie has featured in advertising campaigns for a number of brands including DL1961, Madonna's Material Girl line, Jacquie Aiche, Adidas, Michael Kors, PrettyLittleThing and Tommy Hilfiger. She has appeared in editorials for Tings, Elle, Seventeen and Vanity Fair.

Richie has graced the covers of numerous international fashion magazines, including Mexico's InStyle; US' Complex, Cosmopolitan and Billboard magazine's style issue, Sweets! Magazine, Manifesto, Galore, Remix, Dujour and Es Magazine; UK's Cosmopolitan, Tatler and Asos Magazine; Japan's Vogue and Popular; Brazil's L'officiel; and Singapore's L'Officiel.

=== Fashion design ===
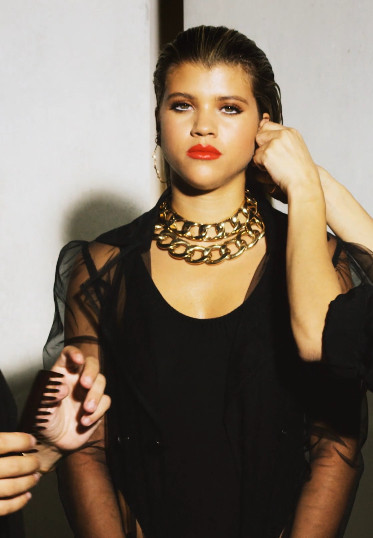
Richie in February 2017

Richie teamed up with Frankie's Bikinis to launch a colorful swimwear collection, released on July 8, 2019, by Francesca Aiello. The collection included tie-dye bathing suits, neon colors and bright florals. Richie designed a clothing collection called "Sofia Richie x Missguided" for UK-based retailer Missguided, which was released on September 17, 2019. The 60-piece collection included tailored pieces, mini dresses and classic coordinating sets, and all the items were priced between $20 and $100. In February 2020, she released a collaboration titled "Rolla's x Sofia Richie" with denim brand Rolla Jeans.

In March 2020, she announced her plans to launch a line of swimwear later that year. Richie wants to eventually expand her collection into a fashion line and launch a beauty company focusing on hair and body. In May 2021, Richie teamed up with her sister Nicole's lifestyle brand House of Harlow 1960 and launched a clothing collection Sofia Richie x House of Harlow 1960. It was a 57-piece line sold at Revolve's online store. In July 2021, she created a capsule collection with 8 Other Reasons consisting of 61 pieces, including jewelry, anklets, bucket hats, tops, metal bags, rings, scarves and eyewear. Her clothing collection with Macy's brand Bar III was released in November 2021. The collection was priced from $39.50 to $149.50.

List of fashion collections by Sofia Richie
Year	Title	Brand	Notes
2019	"Frankies Bikinis x Sofia Richie"	Frankie's Bikinis	Bikini collection
2019	"Sofia Richie x Missguided"	Missguided	Clothing collection
2020	"Rolla's x Sofia Richie"	Rolla Jeans	
2021	"Sofia Richie x House of Harlow 1960"	House of Harlow 1960	
2021	"8 Other Reasons x Sofia Richie"	8 Other Reasons	
2021	"Sofia Richie x bar III"	Bar III	

=== Social media ===
Richie endorses products such as beauty and wellness on Instagram. She has partnered with numerous brands, including Darya Hope, Lulus, Suspicious Antwerp, Nip + Fab, Coca-Cola Zero Sugar, Cotton On and Cheetos.

== Personal life ==
Richie was in a relationship with Justin Bieber from August to September 2016. Richie had an on-again, off-again relationship with media personality Scott Disick from 2017 to 2020.

In April 2021, Richie confirmed her relationship with music executive Elliot Grainge, the son of Sir Lucian Grainge, the chairman and CEO of Universal Music Group. On April 20, 2022, she announced her engagement to Grainge on her Instagram. Richie converted to Judaism ahead of her wedding, and they were married on April 22, 2023, in the south of France. The couple have two children, a daughter born in May 2024, and a son born in March 2026.

== Filmography ==
Television roles
Year	Title	Role	Notes
2014	Candidly Nicole	Herself	3 episodes
2016	Red, White and Bootsy	Herself	TV movie
2019	Flip It Like Disick	Herself	Episode: "The Race to Finish"
2019	Keeping Up with the Kardashians	Herself	Episode: "Three's Company"

Film roles
Year	Title	Role	Notes
2018	Ocean's 8	Herself	Cameo
