= David Oliver Cohen =

American writer, actor and entrepreneur

- Born: June 9, 1980 (age 46); Washington, DC
- Education: New York University
- Occupations: Writer; actor; winemaker
- Years active: 1994–present
- Spouse: Cristi Andrews (m. 2007)
- Children: 2
- Relatives: Tanner Cohen (brother)

David Oliver Cohen (born June 9, 1980) is an American writer, actor and entrepreneur based in New York City. He is one of the authors of the White Girl Problems book series, and a founder of Swish Beverages.

== Early life and education ==
Cohen grew up in Annapolis, Maryland. He attended New York University, where he studied acting. He is Jewish.

== Career ==
=== Writing ===
In 2010, Cohen, his brother Tanner Cohen and Lara Schoenhals created a Twitter account called White Girl Problems, writing under the pseudonym Babe Walker, a fictional 20-something socialite. They signed a deal to turn the Twitter feed into a book series, with the first novel, White Girl Problems, published in 2012 under the pen name Babe Walker. It became a New York Times best-seller the following month. The follow-up, Psychos, was published in 2014, and American Babe, the final novel in the trilogy, was published in 2016. The film rights to White Girl Problems were purchased by Lionsgate in 2013. In 2016, it was announced that the film was in development, to be directed by Lauren Palmigiano and produced by Elizabeth Banks and Max Handelman, and to star Danielle Macdonald.

Under the pseudonym Taylor Bell, a fictional college freshman, Cohen and his brother co-wrote the 2015 novel Dirty Rush. In 2015, it was announced that TriStar had purchased the rights to Dirty Rush, with the film to be produced by Banks and Handelman.

Credited to The Fat Jew, the 2015 book Money Pizza Respect was written by Josh Ostrovsky and Cohen, as a collection of comedic personal essays based on Ostrovsky's life.

=== Acting ===
Cohen starred as Daniel McDaniel on the Nickelodeon show Taina for two years, starting in 2001. Following that, he performed as the lead, narrator and filmmaker Mark Cohen, in the national tour of the musical Rent. From 2006 to 2007, he portrayed Kip Lonegan on the CBS soap opera As the World Turns.

=== Film ===
Cohen produced the documentary Sex Positive, which profiles safe sex activist Richard Berkowitz and premiered at the 2008 South by Southwest Film Festival. He directed and produced the 2010 documentary Fast Boy, about a young man's struggle with cancer.

=== Wine ===
In 2015, Cohen, Josh Ostrovsky, Tanner Cohen and Alexander Ferzan co-founded the company Swish Beverages, producer of several wines including White Girl Rosé and Babe Rosé With Bubbles.

== Personal life ==
Cohen lives in Manhattan with his wife Cristi Andrews, an actress, and their two children. Cohen's younger brother is actor and writer Tanner Cohen.

== Bibliography ==
- White Girl Problems (Hyperion Books, January 31, 2012, ISBN 978-1401324544) - as Babe Walker
- Psychos: A White Girl Problems Book (Gallery Books, April 29, 2014, ISBN 978-1476734156) - as Babe Walker
- Dirty Rush (Gallery Books, January 13, 2015, ISBN 978-1476775289) - as Taylor Bell
- Money Pizza Respect (Grand Central Publishing, November 3, 2015, ISBN 978-1455534777) - with Josh Ostrovsky
- American Babe: A White Girl Problems Book (Gallery Books, June 28, 2016, ISBN 978-1501124846) - as Babe Walker
- Babe Walker: Thirsty (Pocket Star, May 29, 2017, e-book) - as Babe Walker

== Filmography ==
=== Television ===
Year	Series	Network	Role	Notes
1996	The Mystery Files of Shelby Woo	Nickelodeon	Kid 1	1 episode
2001-02	Taina	Nickelodeon	Daniel McDaniel	Seasons 1 & 2 (26 episodes)
2002	The Nick Cannon Show	Nickelodeon	Himself	Season 1, episode 12
2006-07	As the World Turns	CBS	Kip Lonnegan	5 episodes
2007	The Colbert Report	Comedy Central	Blue Boy (voice)	Season 3, episode 1

=== Film ===
Year	Title	Credited as	Notes
1994	Pom Poko	Ponkichi (voice)	
2003	Virgin	Associate Producer	
2008	Sex Positive	Producer	Documentary
2010	Fast Boy	Director, producer, editor	Documentary
2018	White Girl Problems	Based on the novel by	Pre-production
