= Nicole Richie =

American media personality (born 1981)

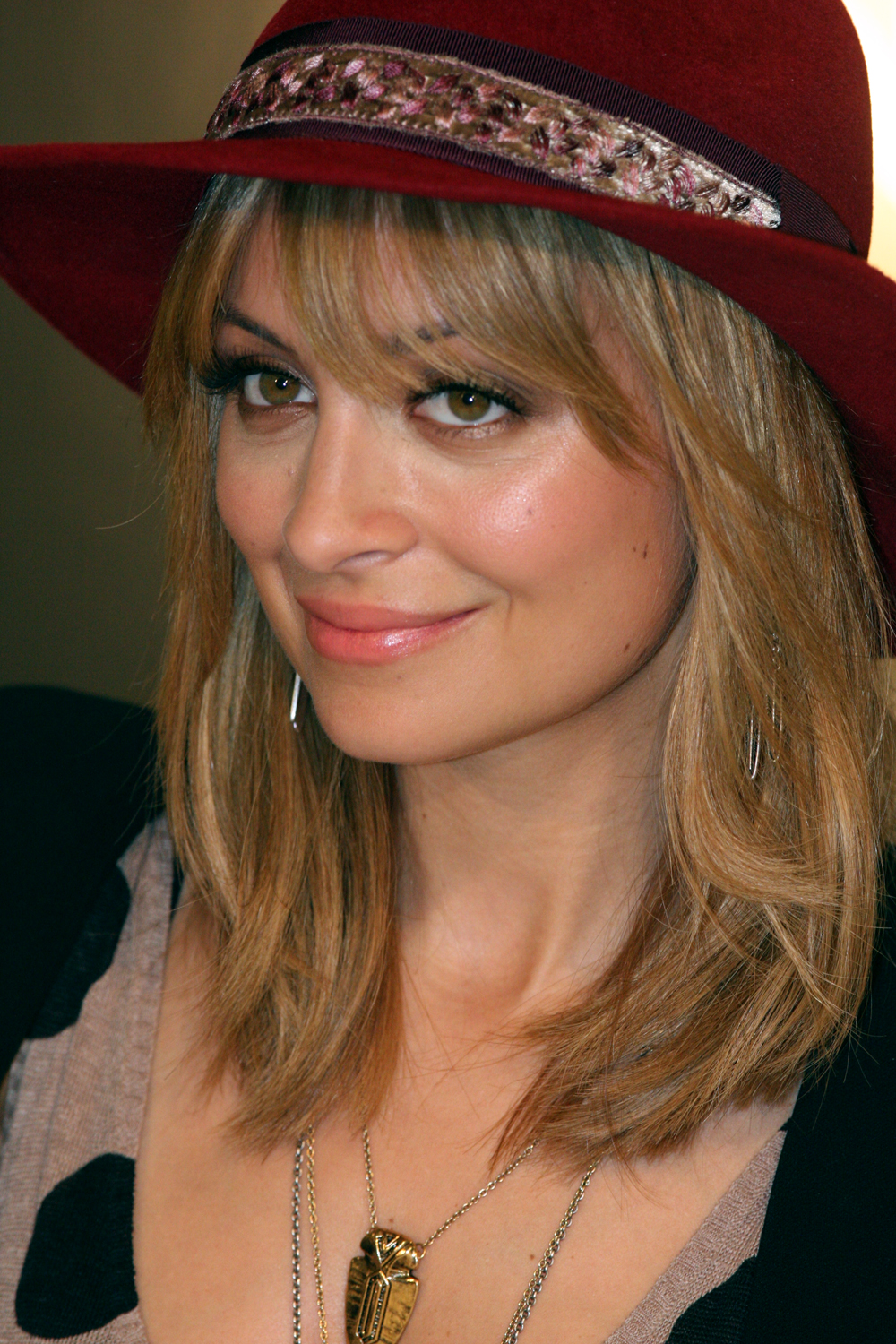
- Richie in 2012
- Born: Nicole Camille Escovedo; September 21, 1981 (age 45); Berkeley, California, U.S.
- Other name: Nikki Fre$h
- Occupations: Media personality; fashion designer; actress
- Years active: 1996–present
- Spouse: Joel Madden (m. 2010)
- Children: 2
- Parents: Lionel Richie (adoptive father); Peter Michael Escovedo (biological father)
- Relatives: Sofia Richie (adoptive sister); Sheila E. (biological aunt); Benji Madden (brother-in-law); Cameron Diaz (sister-in-law)

Nicole Camille Richie (née Escovedo; born September 21, 1981) is an American media personality, fashion designer, and actress. She came to prominence after appearing on the reality television series The Simple Life (2003–2007), in which she starred alongside her friend and fellow socialite Paris Hilton. Richie's personal life attracted media attention during the series' five-year run and thereafter.

Following the conclusion of The Simple Life, Richie continued her career in television, appearing as one of the three judges on the reality competition series Fashion Star (2012–2013). She later starred in the unscripted comedy series Candidly Nicole (2014–2015), which ran for two seasons. From 2017 to 2018, Richie starred in her first series regular acting role as Portia Scott-Griffith in the sitcom Great News. In 2020, she became a judge on the reality competition series Making the Cut. In fashion, Richie is the founder of the lifestyle brand House of Harlow. Richie has also published two novels.

== Early life, family and education ==
Nicole Camille Escovedo was born on September 21, 1981, in Berkeley, California. She is of English, Mexican, and Creole African-American descent. Her biological father, Peter Michael Escovedo, is the brother of musician Sheila E., son of percussionist and bandleader Pete Escovedo, and nephew of guitarist Alejandro Escovedo, and her biological mother is Karen Moss. When she was three years old, her biological parents decided to leave her under the care of Lionel Richie and his first wife Brenda Harvey Richie's family because they could not afford to provide for her. Lionel and Brenda Harvey Richie became her guardians. His 1986 hit song "Ballerina Girl" was written about Nicole.

Brenda Harvey and Lionel Richie legally adopted Nicole when she was nine years old. When Lionel and Brenda went through a bitter public split, they were indulgent to the young Nicole. "Their way of making me happy was to say yes to everything I wanted, but I don't think a little girl should have that much freedom," said Richie in a 2006 interview with Vanity Fair. Following the divorce, Lionel remarried and had two more children: Miles (b. 1994) and Sofia (b. 1998). Richie's godmother is Nancy Davis, daughter of Marvin Davis and mother of Brandon Davis. Richie regularly interacted with musicians her father knew, including Michael Jackson (who was her godfather), Prince and Kenny Rogers. Quincy Jones said in a People magazine interview that he had "known Nicole Richie since she was a baby. She's a very smart girl".

Richie graduated from Montclair College Preparatory School in 1999, then attended the University of Arizona in Tucson, Arizona, alongside Kourtney Kardashian and Luke Walton, where she studied Arts and Media. She did not have a definitive study plan in Arizona, dropped out after two years, and returned to California.

== Career ==
=== Television ===
In 2003, Richie and her best friend, Paris Hilton, starred in the reality series The Simple Life, in which they lived for a month with a family in the rural community of Altus, Arkansas. The series premiere debuted on Fox on December 2, 2003, to 13 million viewers, increasing Fox's reach among viewers 18–49. The series continued for a second and third season.

Fox subsequently canceled the show after a dispute between Hilton and Richie, but it was aired by E! Entertainment Television for its fourth season, drawing nearly one million viewers and was followed by a relatively unsuccessful fifth season. Complications arose during production of the fifth season, with both Richie and Hilton facing major charges for DUI, and at risk of serving jail time. Hilton was sentenced to 23 days in jail, though this was after production of the season had finished. Richie accepted a plea agreement and was sentenced to four days in jail, again after production had wrapped. Despite talks of a sixth season, the series finished its run at the end of the moderately unsuccessful fifth season.

In 2005, Richie made her acting debut in the comedy film Kids in America. Richie has guest starred in television series including Eve, Six Feet Under, American Dreams, 8 Simple Rules for Dating My Teenage Daughter, and Chuck. Richie appeared as a guest judge during the premiere episode of the seventh season of the reality competition series Project Runway. From 2012 to 2013, she judged the reality competition series Fashion Star. From 2014 to 2015, Richie starred in the unscripted comedy series Candidly Nicole. It is loosely based on Richie's posts on Twitter.

In 2016, Richie was cast as Portia Scott-Griffith, a news anchor, in the sitcom Great News, created by Tracey Wigfield and produced by Wigfield and Tina Fey. The acting role marked Richie's first as a regular on a television series. When speaking about Richie's casting, Fey stated that she was "a really funny person" with "an instant likability" and "good timing without really pushing it." The series premiered on NBC in April 2017. Sonia Saraiya of Variety called Richie's performance "a turn that reveals her substantial comedic talents", while The Washington Post's Emily Yahr highlighted how she "artfully delivers her many one-liners". The series concluded in 2018 after two seasons.

In 2020, she created, executive produced, and starred in digital platform Quibi's series Nikki Fre$h, which chronicles the career of Richie's rapper alter ego of the same name. That same year, she appeared as a judge in the reality competition series Making the Cut.

=== Writing ===
In 2005, Richie wrote a semi-autobiographical novel, The Truth About Diamonds, which was released by Bharell Jackson Publishing. The novel is loosely based on her life but is mostly fictional. It chronicles the life of a famous singer's adopted daughter named Chloe Parker, who makes her way through all the popular nightclubs and parties in Hollywood while battling a drug addiction. In early January 2006, The Truth About Diamonds peaked at number No. 32 in Hardcover Fiction on The New York Times Best-Seller List.

Richie's second novel, Priceless, was released on September 28, 2010. It tells the story of a girl who loses everything and then learns about what really matters in life.

=== Fashion ===
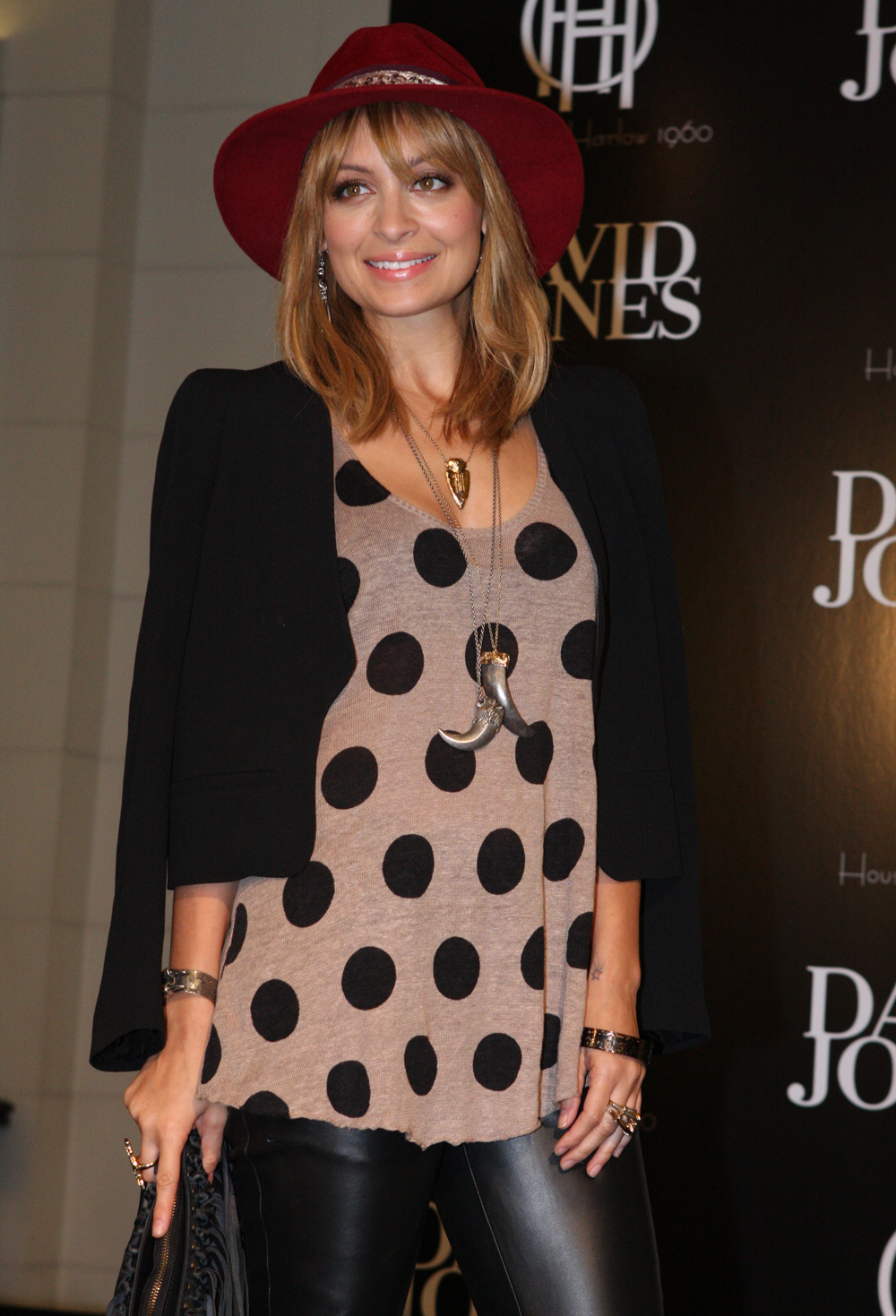
Richie promoting her House of Harlow brand at David Jones in Sydney in 2012

Richie has been featured in several fashion blogs and magazines such as Harper's Bazaar, Seventeen, Lucky, Marie Claire, Elle, InStyle, Paper, Company, Nylon, Tatler, Flare and Teen Vogue. She has also modeled for Australia's Vogue and Elle; US' People, Stuff, Blender and Hollywood Reporter; Mexico's Marie Claire and UK's Glamour. Richie has been the face of Bongo Jeans and Jimmy Choo advertising campaigns. In April 2007, Richie announced plans to start a jewelry, accessories, and sunglasses line along with a perfume and style book. In October 2008, she debuted a jewelry line, named House of Harlow. The line became available at Kitson's online boutique. In spring 2010, the line was extended to include apparel and shoes. House of Harlow later became a lifestyle brand including eyewear, home fragrance, and accessories.

In 2009, Richie joined maternity store A Pea in the Pod to create the new collection maternity clothes. The line was titled "Nicole" which had pieces that she would wear as an expectant mother. In February 2010, Richie expanded her fashion business with a women's line called Winter Kate, her daughter's two middle names. The collection was inspired by timeless prints and shapes, beautiful paisley and florals.

In 2010, Richie won "Entrepreneur of the Year" for her House of Harlow brand at the Glamour Women of the Year Awards. House of Harlow was also nominated in the category "Celebrity Fashion Line" at the 2010 Teen Choice Awards. In July 2011, the brand unveiled a 14-piece handbag collection, which became available at Bergdorf Goodman, Neiman Marcus, Nordstrom and Shopbop. In May 2012, it was reported both Ritchie's lines, House of Harlow 1960 and Winter Kate reached estimated sales of $55 million combined while Richie only receives 5% of revenues, according to the Hollywood Reporter. She launched a collection for Macy's Impulse line in September 2012, which was sold in 100 Macy's stores as well as online. Her first fragrance, Nicole by Nicole Richie, was also launched in September 2012. Her second fragrance, No Rules by Nicole Richie was launched in March 2014.

In 2017, Richie became Urban Decay's brand ambassador, representing their "Troublemaker" mascara. House of Harlow partnered with Urban Decay for a limited-edition collection in April 2018. The line was exclusively sold at Revolve's official website.

=== Music ===
Richie made her musical debut in February 2005 with a live appearance on ABC's The View playing the piano. In 2004, she auditioned for the role of Maureen in the popular Broadway hit Rent but did not get the part. In February 2010, Richie was featured on the charity single "We Are the World 25 for Haiti". In September 2013, Richie made a cameo appearance in Christina Aguilera's music video for the song "Let There Be Love".

Richie stated in April 2020 that she would release a comedy rap album under the moniker Nikki Fre$h; confirmed songs for the album include "Drip Drip", "The Gem Song", and "Bee's Tea". The album, titled Unearthed, was released on August 28.

=== Philanthropy ===
In November 2007, Richie and her husband Joel Madden created The Richie Madden Children's Foundation in support of disadvantaged young mothers and children. She has been involved with the Red Cross, UNICEF, Elton John AIDS Foundation, Charlize Theron Africa Outreach Project, Dana-Farber Cancer Institute, March of Dimes, Playing for Change, Small Steps Project, and Baby2Baby. Richie is a board member of Baby2Baby.

In 2007, Richie and Madden donated 100 baby gifts to expectant mothers at Los Angeles Free Clinic, through The Richie Madden Children's Foundation. In May 2008, Richie and Madden shot a UNICEF public-service announcement to generate aid for the cyclone-devastated Myanmar. Richie and Madden have also written blogs on the UNICEF website and encouraged people to help children in need. Richie, Joel and Benji Madden along with UNICEF held a fundraiser for the Tap Project in March 2009. They sold 143 water pumps to bring water directly to the villages and raised $100,000. Esprit donated 10% of all the sales on April 2, 2009, at their newly opened 3rd Street Promenade store to The Richie-Madden Children's Foundation. The Richie-Madden Foundation specially designed "Cup with a Cause" for 7-Eleven. It was a part of their charity-focused coffee campaign in February 2010. During 2010 the Foundation worked together with Beyond Shelter, a non-profit organization devoted to providing shelter for homeless families in Los Angeles.

Richie has been a board member of the Environmental Media Association for several years and took part in their awareness program in May 2009. Each member "adopted" a school to raise awareness for the program and help students with environmental education. She also participated in a charity hand-me-downs auction that started on the website handmedowns.com. The proceeds went directly to The Richie Madden Children's Foundation to help bring more opportunities to children in the US and abroad.

In November 2011, Richie hosted Baby2Baby's charity event to support families in need during holiday season. She was a guest speaker at WE Charity's WE Day California event in 2018.

== Personal life ==
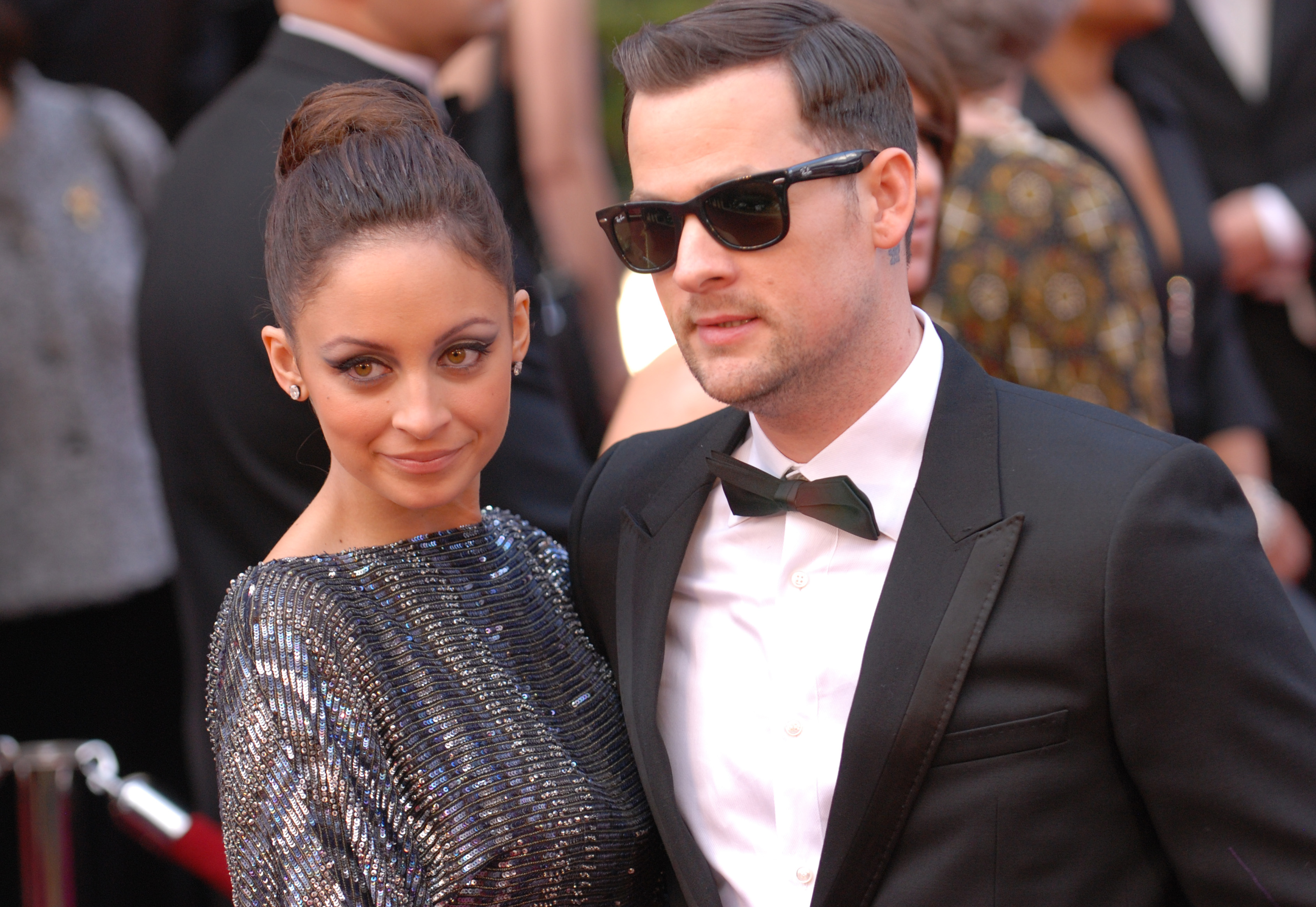
Richie and husband Joel Madden at the 82nd Academy Awards on March 7, 2010

In April 2005, reports surfaced that Richie and longtime friend Paris Hilton were no longer speaking to each other. Hilton commented: "It's no big secret that Nicole and I are no longer friends. Nicole knows what she did, and that's all I'm ever going to say about it". Neither Richie nor Hilton spoke publicly about the cause of the split. They reconciled in October 2006.

Richie was briefly engaged to DJ Adam Goldstein, whom she dated from 2004 to 2006.

In December 2006, she began dating singer Joel Madden of rock group Good Charlotte. They have two children: a daughter, Kate, born in January 2008, and a son born in September 2009. In February 2008, the first photos of their daughter were sold to People magazine for $1 million. The couple confirmed their engagement in February 2010 and married on December 11, 2010. They reside in Los Angeles, California.

=== Health ===
In early 2006, Richie was notably thinner compared with her previous appearance in the first two seasons of The Simple Life. In May, she told Vanity Fair, "I know I'm too thin right now, so I wouldn't want any young girl looking at me and saying, ‘That's what I want to look like’”. She also said, "I started seeing a nutritionist and a doctor. I was scared that it could be something more serious." During this time, it was reported that she had also sought the help of a psychiatrist and a personal trainer. Later that year, in September, Richie stated "I am not anorexic. I am not bulimic. I do not have an eating disorder." On October 27, 2006, it was announced that Richie was seeking treatment for "an inability to put on weight", though it was not for an eating disorder.

In March 2007, Richie was taken to the hospital for dehydration. On March 21, her representatives announced she suffered from hypoglycemia.

=== Legal issues ===
In October 2002, Richie was arrested following a brawl in a New York City nightclub. The charges were dropped. In February 2003, she checked herself into a rehabilitation center following her arrest in Malibu, California for driving with a revoked license and possession of heroin. In August, she was sentenced to three years' probation.

On December 11, 2006, Richie was arrested by the California Highway Patrol after she failed a field sobriety test. She was charged with driving under the influence on State Route 134 in the Burbank/Glendale, California area. Several motorists had reported a black Mercedes-Benz G-Class entering the freeway on the exit ramp and traveling in the opposite traffic direction. She admitted to using marijuana and the narcotic Vicodin before the incident. On July 27, 2007, Richie was sentenced to four days in jail at the Century Regional Detention Center in Lynwood, California. However, she only served about 82 minutes of the sentence and was released at 16:37 PDT on August 23, 2007. A spokeswoman for the sheriff's department told People magazine that Richie "was released early due to overcrowding in the jail system." Richie enrolled in an 18-month anti-drinking driver education program the following month, according to papers filed with the Superior Court of California.

In June 2010, Richie's probation was extended one year to March 2011 because she missed her anti-drunk driving class. However, Richie's probation was terminated early in December 2010, after her lawyer presented details to the judge that Richie had completed all terms of her probation.

== Filmography ==
=== Film ===
Year	Title	Role	Notes
2005	Kids in America	Kelly Stepford	
2023	Good Burger 2	Herself	
2024	Don't Tell Mom the Babysitter's Dead	Rose	
2024	Summer Camp	Sage	
2026	Stop! That! Train!	Workaholic	

=== Television ===
Year	Title	Role	Notes
2003–2004	E! True Hollywood Story	Herself	Guest Cast: Season 8-9
2003–2005	Punk'd	Herself	Guest Cast: Season 2 & 4
2003–2007	The Simple Life	Herself	Main role
2004	Eve	Karen	Episode: "Valentine's Day Reloaded"
2004	Rock Me Baby	Amanda	Episode: "Kiss and Don't Tell"
2004	Six Feet Under	Herself	Episode: "Untitled"
2004	American Dreams	Brenda Reid	Episode: "Charade"
2004–2005	Mad TV	Herself	Guest Cast: Season 9-10
2005	Style Star	Herself	Episode: "Nicole Richie"
2005	8 Simple Rules	Ashley	Episode: "Ditch Day"
2006	The Hills	Herself	Episode: "New City, New Drama"
2006	THS Investigates	Herself	Episode: "Starving for Perfection"
2007	Extreme Hollywood	Herself	Episode: "Star Treatment"
2007	America's Next Top Model	Herself	Episode: "The Girl Who Gets Thrown in the Pool"
2008, 2010	Chuck	Heather Chandler	2 episodes
2009	The Rachel Zoe Project	Herself	Episode: "'Pin Thin' and Pissed Off"
2009	Styl'd	Herself	Episode: "Catwalks and Catfights"
2010	CrispyMedia	Herself	Episode: "Nicole Richie"
2010	Project Runway	Herself	2 episodes
2012	The New Normal	Herself	Episode: "Para-New Normal Activity"
2012–2013	Fashion Star	Herself	Judge
2014–2015	Candidly Nicole	Herself	Main role
2015	Barely Famous	Herself	Episode: "Barely Famous"
2015	Empire	Herself	Episode: "Et Tu, Brute?"
2016	RuPaul's Drag Race	Herself	Episode: "Keeping It 100!"
2017	Lip Sync Battle	Herself	Episode: "Nicole Richie vs. John Michael Higgins"
2017	Drop the Mic	Herself	Episode: "Vanessa Hudgens vs. Michael Bennett / James Corden vs. Nicole Richie"
2017–2018	Great News	Portia Scott-Griffith	Main role
2018	Food Exposed with Nelufar Hedayat	Herself	Episode: "Waste"
2018	Camping	Beth-Ann	Episode: "Up All Night"
2019	Treat Yourself	Herself	Episode: "Treat Yourself with Nicole Richie"
2019	Grace and Frankie	Kareena G	Episode: "The Squat"
2020	Bless This Mess	Sierra	Recurring role (season 2)
2020	Nikki Fre$h	Nikki Fre$h	Main role
2020–2022	Making the Cut	Herself	Judge (season 1, 3)
2021	Mary McCartney Serves It Up	Herself	1 episode
2021	Martha Gets Down and Dirty	Herself	Episode: "Fowl Play with Martha"
2022	Paris in Love	Herself	Episode: "I Do, Don't I? Part Two"
2022	Cursed Friends	Lizzie Lennox	Television film
2022	Baking It	Herself	Episode: "Bake, Bake, BOOM!"
2023	HouseBroken	Ivy (voice)	Recurring role (season 2)
2024	Paris & Nicole: The Encore	Herself	Main role
2026	Running Point	Nicole Vark	Episode: "We Are Broke"

=== Music videos ===
Year	Music Video	Artist
1986	"Hands Across America"	Voices of America
1998	"So Into You"	Tamia
2006	"I Call It Love"	Lionel Richie
2010	"We Are the World 25 for Haiti"	Artists for Haiti
2013	"Let There Be Love"	Christina Aguilera

== Discography ==
- Unearthed (2020)

=== Singles ===
- "Stunnah" (2013)

== Award nominations ==
Year	Award	Category	Result
2005	Teen Choice Awards	Choice TV Personality: Female	Nominated
2010	Teen Choice Awards	Best Celebrity Fashion Line	Nominated
2010	Glamour Awards	Entrepreneur of the Year	Won
2011	ACE Awards	Influencer Award	Won

== Published works ==
- The Truth About Diamonds: A Novel. New York: Harper Entertainment. 2005. ISBN 0060820489. OCLC 487161489.
- Priceless: A Novel. New York: Atria Books. 2010. ISBN 9781439166154. OCLC 995490419.

Preceded by David Spade and Justin Timberlake	Teen Choice Awards host 2004 (with Paris Hilton)	Succeeded by Hilary Duff and Rob Schneider
