= Swish Beverages =

American wine brand

- Company type: Private
- Industry: Wine
- Founded: 2015
- Founder: Josh Ostrovsky; Tanner Cohen; David Oliver Cohen; Alexander Ferzan
- Headquarters: New York, NY
- Area served: USA
- Owner: Anheuser-Busch InBev
- Website: www.swishbev.com

Swish Beverages (stylized as SWISH) was an American wine brand produced in California. It was launched with the release of White Girl Rosé in 2015.

== History ==
=== Founding ===
Swish Beverages was formed by social media personality Josh Ostrovsky (aka "The Fat Jewish"), David Oliver Cohen, Tanner Cohen (the brothers behind the White Girl Problems book series), and Alexander Ferzan. In June 2015, they launched White Girl Rosé, a blend of Sauvignon Blanc and White Zinfandel.

=== Babe ===
On June 12, 2016, Swish released Babe Rosé, a canned sparkling rosé. In 2018, Babe Grigio with Bubbles, and Babe Red with Bubbles were released. Diplo is a notable investor in the brand.

=== Anheuser-Busch InBev acquisition ===
In June 2019, it was announced that Anheuser-Busch InBev had acquired Swish Beverages after first acquiring a minority stake in 2018, marking the brewer's largest wine investment to date. InBev discontinued the brand in 2023.

== Product list ==
Name	ABV (US)	Notes
Babe Rosé With Bubbles	12%	Canned bubbly rosé
Babe Red With Bubbles	12%	Canned bubbly red wine
Babe Grigio With Bubbles	12%	Canned bubbly Pinot Grigio
White Girl Rosé	12%	Sauvignon Blanc and White Zinfandel blend
Family Time Is Hard	12%	Pinot Grigio
Winter is the Worst	12%	Red wine
