= Team Facelift =

American hip hop group

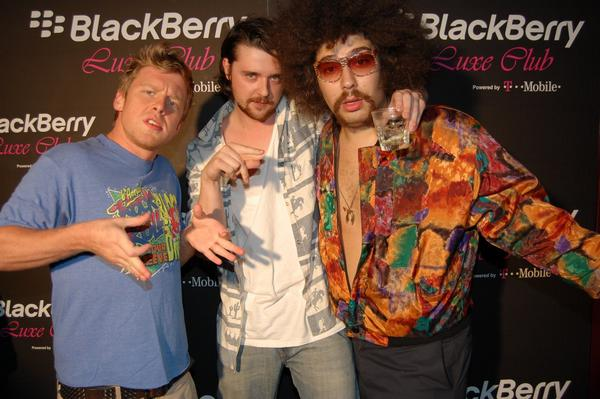
- Alden Fonda, Machine, and the Fat Jew in 2008

Background information
- Origin: New York City, U.S.
- Genres: Hip hop Electro; Glam
- Years active: 2004-2010
- Label: Duck Down Records
- Members: Machine; Josh Ostrovsky; Alden Fonda; Tommy Mas

Team Facelift was an American hip hop group based in New York City that signed with Duck Down Records.

== History ==
The group was founded in 2004 and consisted of its three MCs—Machine, the Fat Jew, Alden Fonda—and one producer, Tommy Mas. The three met at Skidmore College in Saratoga Springs, New York. The group's sound was described by the New York Post as a cross between Barbra Streisand and Wu-Tang Clan.

The group first gained national attention when headlining MTV's 52/52 campaign, which featured artists in short interstitials during commercial breaks. Team Facelift was the only group to appear that was unsigned.

== Art direction ==
We try to bridge the gap—we do [hip hop] music, but we want to bring it to the level where you could play it at a slumber party with 12-year-old girls. You could play it at the mall. You could play it in Belgium. It's for quiet Asians, a dentist on his day off, orphans, quadriplegic transvestites, gothic Puerto Ricans, middle-aged moms with short shorts and big T-shirts with polar bears on them, Dominican dads, people with two dads, angsty teenagers who hate their dads, bloods, crips, boys and girls.

— The Fat Jew,

Team Facelift is known for its bizarre stage theatrics and antics, such as the use of pyrotechnics and live animals (particularly doves). The Fat Jew is famous for his on-stage nudity, often performing in nothing but a thong and construction boots.

It is a diverse sound. Of course we're known as rappers, and it's obvious that we are cut above pretty much any of our contemporaries when it comes to lyrics, so the people demand we come equipped with that straight-up hip hop. At the same time, we're also moving in the direction of house music, and not that cheeseball glam-electro sound, but more classic New York underground house sound. It is reminiscent of what you would hear while wilding out at the Tunnel in the mid ’90s when house music still had elements of hip hop. That's a look nobody is getting after these days, but we guarantee it's going to pop. The fans can expect wet shirts, us doing it big like Ricki Lake's thighs, arena rap, unlimited babes, exploding cars, warm gin, good hip hop music, and non-stop action.

— Alden Fonda,

In 2008, executive producers for the popular show The Daily 10 on the E! Entertainment channel selected Team Facelift to become the New York bureau of that show, conducting man-on-the-street, public-opinion, and one-on-one interviews of the New York City entertainment scene, while adding [its] unique brand of color and humor to the segment. Late that year, the group was featured on the single "Shake That Ass" on famed producer Armand Van Helden's New York: a Mix Odyssey 2 album.

In fall 2009, Team Facelift and Red Bull North America partnered together for Band on the Run, a unique tour that consisted of surprise performances from Team Facelift at major Colleges and Universities in the Northeast and Mid-Atlantic regions of the US.

The group's first album, Mixed Emotions, was released in December 2006 on its independent label, Facelift Records. The group's first label project (titled "Paid to Rage") was scheduled to be released in the fall of 2010 on Duck Down Records, and renowned house-music remixer, producer, and DJ Junior Sanchez would be executive producer of the album.

In 2011 the group parted ways, citing "creative differences," and their debut album was never released.

== Discography ==
=== Studio albums ===
- Mixed Emotions (2006)

=== Mixtapes ===
- Famous In Japan (2003)
- Mixtape Vol. I (2005)
- Fancy/Sleazy (2007)
- Passion Cove (2008)
- 6 Grams (2010)
