= Josh Ostrovsky =

American actor and television personality (born 1982)

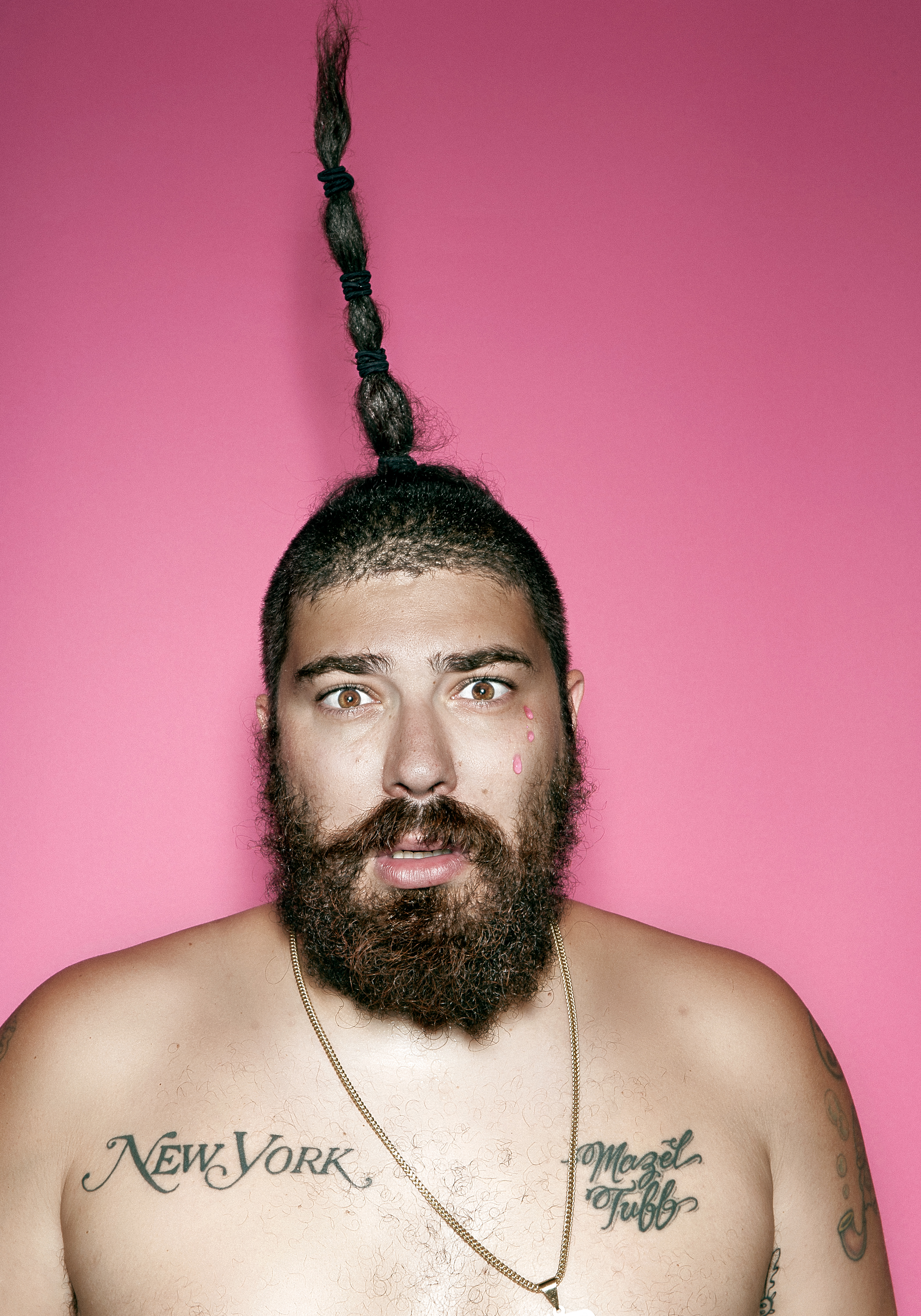
- Publicity shot of Ostrovsky
- Born: Joshua Ostrovsky; February 18, 1982 (age 44); New York City, New York, U.S.
- Other names: The Fat Jew, The Fat Jewish, Jewther Vandross, Jewsan Sarandon, Fatrick Jewing, The FatJew of Liberty, Fat Shams Charania
- Education: University at Albany, SUNY
- Occupations: Social media and television personality, vintner, actor, musician, fashion designer, plus-size model
- Years active: 2005–present
- Website: fatjew.net

Joshua Ostrovsky (born February 18, 1982), known professionally as The Fat Jewish, is an American entrepreneur, social media influencer, author and plus size model.

== Early life ==
Ostrovsky was born and raised in New York City to a Russian-born radiologist father Paul, and a nutritionist mother Rebecca. He grew up in Manhattan on the Upper West Side. He attended several schools, starting at the Packer school in Brooklyn, and then attending Trevor Day School and the Dwight School, both on the Upper West Side. As a very young actor, he appeared in several commercials, including one for Hershey's. After attending New York University and Skidmore College and being expelled from both, he enrolled in State University of New York at Albany, graduating in 2006 with a Bachelor of Arts in journalism.

== Career ==
=== Social media ===
In 2011, Ostrovsky started an Instagram account with the handle "TheFatJewish". The account went viral in 2013 after Ostrovsky posted a video parodying SoulCycle, in which he led a spin class for homeless people on Citi Bikes parked on the street. In 2013, his Instagram account was suspended due to inappropriate content. In response, he organized a rally held outside Instagram's New York office. The protest was live-streamed on Vice.com, and his account was restored after 15 minutes. In 2014 The New York Times wrote that "he has parlayed a profane sense of humor that mocks the tropes of social-media culture and the hipsters who propagate them; an apparent affection for pot, pets and grandparents; and his own slovenly, outlandish physical appearance... into a huge web following." Time magazine named Ostrovsky to its 2015 list of The 30 Most Influential People on the Internet. As of December 2022, he had over 10 million followers on Instagram.

Ostrovsky has been hired to do product placement in his social media posts by companies including Burger King, Virgin Mobile, Apple, Budweiser, Weight Watchers, and Stella Artois. In 2015 he signed on as a spokesperson for Seamless.

=== Swish Beverages ===
Ostrovsky is a co-founder of Swish Beverages, which launched White Girl Rosé in 2015, followed by the Babe family of sparkling canned wines. In June 2019, it was announced that Anheuser-Busch InBev had acquired Swish Beverages, marking the brewer's largest wine investment to date.

=== Film, television, and commercials ===
In 2009, Ostrovsky was hired as an entertainment reporter interviewing celebrities on The Daily 10 on E! He later hosted the rap interview web series An Intimate Conversation. He sold a show parodying the Williamsburg, Brooklyn hipster culture to Amazon in 2013, which went unproduced. In 2014, he signed a deal to develop a scripted series for Comedy Central, based on his life. He signed with Creative Artists Agency in 2015, and that year began making regular appearances on Bloomberg News, starred in a Bud Light commercial that aired during Super Bowl XLIX, and appeared in the music video for DNCE's "Cake by the Ocean", as well as "Boys" by Charli XCX. He has appeared as himself in numerous reality television series, including 3AM and The Real Housewives of Beverly Hills. He has also played supporting roles in several films, including the teen comedy Status Update, starring Ross Lynch and Olivia Holt. He was featured in a 2017 ad campaign for Malibu Rum. He appears in the documentary The American Meme, which premiered at the 2018 Tribeca Film Festival.

=== Modeling and fashion ===
In June 2012, Ostrovsky signed a modeling contract with One Management. He claims to be the world's first male plus-size model. He appeared in a photo spread in Inked magazine's May 2015 issue, and was featured on the covers of the magazines treats! in 2016 and Nude in 2017.

At New York Fashion Week on September 16, 2015, his Dad Fashion Show debuted his collection of men's apparel.

=== Book ===
Ostrovsky formerly hosted a radio show on Apple Music Beats 1 called Money, Pizza, Respect. The book of the same name, a collection of personal essays and images, was published by Grand Central Publishing in 2015. The book's cover parodies the cover of Walter Isaacson's 2011 biography Steve Jobs.

=== Music ===
While at SUNY Albany, Ostrovsky was a member of the hip hop trio Team Facelift, where he first started going by the name Fat Jew. He has said that the moniker was inspired by one of his counselors at Eisner Camp and by Screw magazine publisher Al Goldstein. Team Facelift formed in 2004, signed with Duck Down Records and released the album Mixed Emotions in 2006. They broke up in 2010.

In September 2016, Ostrovsky announced his Major Lazer tribute band Major Behavior, formed with DJ Maachew Bentley and billed as the world's first EDM tribute band. Major Behavior toured in 2016 as a part of Ostrovsky's IRL Tour. For the second IRL Tour in 2017, Major Behavior toured with Dillon Francis, RL Grime and Party Favor. Major Behavior was joined onstage by Major Lazer's Diplo during a May 2017 performance in Chicago. In 2018, Ostrovsky hosted a radio show called Major Behavior on Diplo's Revolution, an electronic music channel on SiriusXM.

== Controversy ==
In 2015, Ostrovsky was accused of posting screenshots of other comedians' jokes on Instagram and Twitter without their permission, and with the credits cropped out. After several stories were published about this behavior, Ostrovsky edited his past posts to credit the authors of the jokes.

== Personal life ==
Ostrovsky is an ordained minister and has officiated many wedding ceremonies, including a spontaneous wedding at Nikki Beach in Miami in December 2017.

He has a son named Buddy, born 2021.

== Bibliography ==
- Money Pizza Respect (Grand Central Publishing, 2015)

== Filmography ==
Film
Year	Title	Role	Notes
2010	Bolt From the Blue	Luther	Short film
2012	Ben Banks	Phil Macey	
2012	All Wifed Out	Will	
2012	Bottle Poppaz	Marcus	
2016	Zoolander 2	Gleek	
2016	Nerve	Dirt Beard	
2018	Status Update	Bearded Dude	
2018	The Peach Panther		
2018	The American Meme	Himself	
2019	Uncut Gems	Noah	
2023	This Is Not Financial Advice	Self	
Television
Year	Title	Role	Notes
2007-2010	The Daily 10	Self	10 Episodes
2013	Rude Tube	Self	Reality
2014	TakePart Live	Self	Reality
2015	3AM	Self	5 Episodes
2015	Talk Stoop	Self	Season 9, ep. 5
2015	Ridiculousness	Self	Season 6, ep. 32
2015	Candidly Nicole	Self	Reality
2016	Greatest Party Story Ever	Self	Season 2, ep. 5 (MTV)
2017	Watch What Happens Live with Andy Cohen	Self	Bartender
2017	The Real Housewives of Beverly Hills	Self	Reality
2017	Million Dollar Listing	Self	Reality
2018	The Hollywood Puppet Show	Self	Season 2, ep.7 (Fuse)
Music Videos
Year	Song	Artist(s)	Notes
2010	"Barbra Streisand"	Duck Sauce	
2014	"#Selfie"	The Chainsmokers	
2014	"When We Were Young"	Dillon Francis	
2015	"Cake by the Ocean"	DNCE	
2017	"Boys"	Charli XCX	
