= 3AM (TV series) =

American reality documentary series

- Genre: Reality; Documentary
- Created by: Dick Wolf
- Directed by: Stacey Angeles
- Country of origin: United States
- Original language: English
- No. of seasons: 1
- No. of episodes: 7

Production
- Executive producers: Dick Wolf; Banks Tarver; Ken Druckerman; Ted Bourne; Stacey Angeles; Mark Perez; Marie McGovern; Tom Thayer
- Producers: Stuart Fero; Kevin Vargas; Warren Gumpel
- Production location: New York
- Running time: 25 minutes
- Production companies: Wolf Reality; Left/Right

Original release
- Network: Showtime
- Release: May 28 – July 9, 2015

3AM is an American reality documentary television series about the late-night life of New York City. The voyeuristic documentary series puts the spotlight on the lives of five New York citizens and veterans to the city's night life. The series debuted on the premium cable channel Showtime on May 28, 2015. Showtime continued to air a 7 episode-long first season. The season finale aired on July 9, 2015.

3AM was met by critics with a mixed reception. The series has been praised for its provocative visual style, but has also been received as mildly entertaining.

After its initial 7-episode run, Showtime cancelled the show in January 2016.

== Cast ==
=== Main ===
Each episode of the series follows a single evening with the following five members of New York City's night life crowd.

- Josh "The Fat Jew" (Season 1): Josh is an internet celebrity, a veteran of New York City's late-night life and a self-described "Magellan" of the night life in New York. He has been described as a "crazy partier" and will attend a wide variety of parties, from "Pokémon raves to stripper parties". Josh is determined to prove that New York City has the craziest parties in the world.
- Kirill (Season 1): Kirill is a charming nightlife photographer. The focus of his photography is on action of the "girls gone wild" nature. In addition, Kirill has a girlfriend who is not enthusiastic of his chosen livelihood.
- Vashtie (Season 1): Vashtie, also known as "Va$htie", is a DJ and filmmaker from Albany. She studied at the School of Visual Arts (SVA) in New York. Vashtie became a part of the late night crowd and does her best to get away from her rough childhood.
- Markus (Season 1): Markus is an infamous and glamorous doorman and stand-up comedian. Markus is trying to balance a relationship with his boyfriend with a life filled with extravagant temptations.
- Samantha (Season 1): Samantha, who also goes by Abby, is a photographer by day. But by night, she is a beautiful escort. Samantha holds a strong desire for a more normal life, but struggles to walk away from New York City's late-night life.

== Production and development ==
3AM was created by television producer Dick Wolf. Wolf, along with Tom Thayer with Wolf Reality, are also executive producers on the show, as well as Banks Tarver and Ken Druckerman from the New York-based Left/Right Productions (part of the Red Arrow Entertainment Group) and Marie McGovern. Although Wolf is credited as the creator of the series, Marie McGovern stated in an interview with the NY Daily News that the series was her brainchild. In the interview, McGovern, a former news assignment editor at the same newspaper, noted that she was inspired by working in the early morning shifts and reading police reports on the "craziness that would go on the night before."

== Episodes ==
Season	Episodes	Originally aired	
Season	Episodes	Series premiere	Series finale
1	7	May 28, 2015	July 9, 2015

=== Season 1 (2015) ===
Episode No.	Title	Original air date
1	"A Night Is a Living Thing"	May 28, 2015
2	"I Created This Monster"	June 4, 2015
3	"There's Temptation Everywhere"	June 11, 2015
4	"It Smells Like Balls in Here"	June 18, 2015
5	"You Need a Freelance Boo"	June 25, 2015
6	"You Have to Find Your Own Resolution"	July 2, 2015
7	"This One's Just for the Stories"	July 9, 2015

== Critical response ==
Upon the series premiere, 3AM was met with a mixed critical reception. In a more negative review, Brian Lowry from Variety thought that while the show was "visually provocative", 3AM was "only mildly entertaining" and "never for a moment truly convincing." Lowry also criticised the title of the series, which he noted in his review as conveying the impression that "strange things happen at night while those who work the day shift slumber, especially around the designated hour." Lowry claimed this was an insubstantial construct that was employed primarily to present titillating moments to the audience. In addition, Lowry criticised the character followed by the series for giving the impression of posturing for the cameras, which "offsets the effect of the gritty photography and dreamy music used to set the mood."

However, Mike Hale of The New York Times held a more positive review of the series. Hale referred to the series as "refreshing" when compared to Showtime's more popular and Emmy Award-winning shows such as Masters of Sex. In his review, Hale noted that the show had a "disarming matter-of-factness" that he thought to make the show "easy to watch."
