= The American Meme =

2018 documentary film by Bert Marcus

- Promotional poster
- Directed by: Bert Marcus
- Written by: Bert Marcus
- Produced by: Bert Marcus; Cassandra Thornton
- Starring: Paris Hilton; Josh Ostrovsky; Kirill Bichutsky; Brittany Furlan; Hailey Bieber; DJ Khaled; Emily Ratajkowski
- Cinematography: Will Dearborn; Abraham Martinez
- Edited by: Tchavdar Georgiev; Monique Zavistovski
- Music by: Tyler Strickland
- Production company: Bert Marcus Productions
- Distributed by: Netflix
- Release date: December 7, 2018
- Country: United States
- Language: English

The American Meme is a 2018 American documentary film that explores the lifestyle and trajectory of four social media influencers. The film was directed, produced and written by Bert Marcus, and follows Paris Hilton, Emily Ratajkowski, DJ Khaled and Josh Ostrovsky as they work to create commercial brands out of their online presence.

The American Meme premiered at the 2018 Tribeca Film Festival, where it was acquired by Netflix. The purchase was recorded as one of the most high-profile documentary acquisitions of 2018. It was released as a Netflix Original on December 7, 2018.

== Plot ==
The American Meme explores the online footprint and behind the-scenes stories of four social media celebrities who have each utilised online platforms to gain followers and become 'influencers' in the digital age.

The documentary film raises the idea of modern alienation under capitalism and explores various diverse material on the likes of Paris Hilton, Josh Ostrovsky, Brittany Furlan, and Kirill Bichutsky's rise to fame, strategies to maintain influence in social media spaces and difficulties in maintaining this influence and the use of social media as a source of income.

== Cast ==
- Kirill Bichutsky
- Hailey Bieber
- Amanda Cerny
- Dane Cook
- Brittany Furlan
- Paris Hilton
- DJ Khaled
- Tommy Lee
- Josh Ostrovsky
- Emily Ratajkowski

== Production ==
The American Meme was directed by Bert Marcus. Bert Marcus is the founder of the production studio Bert Marcus Productions and has directed three films. The two other films are What We Started (2017) and Champs (2014).

He has been a producer on nine films in total, which include Human Capital (2019) and How to Make Money Selling Drugs (2012).

== Critical reception ==
On the review aggregation website Rotten Tomatoes, the documentary has an approval rating of 94% and an average score of 6.8/10 based on 31 critics. The site's critical consensus reads, "The American Meme dives into the shallow end of modern celebrity, emerging with a series of fascinating – and surprisingly deep – observations." Metacritic rated it 60 points out of 100 based on seven reviews, which indicates "mixed or average reviews".

Time Out New York named it the number one film to watch in the article "The 10 best movies at Tribeca Film Festival 2018", writing that the documentary "finds its way to an unexpected sadness and maybe something deeper and cautionary." Owen Gleiberman of Variety described it as "highly entertaining and an essential snapshot of the narcotic voyeuristic parasitic American fishbowl", following its premiere at the 2018 Tribeca Film Festival. Gleiberman went on to say that, "Bert Marcus, the director of The American Meme, works in a kaleidoscopic style that channels the glitzy, fragmented screen-shot spirit of his subjects. At the same time, he gets us close to them, so that we can see the kind of people they are: shrewdly likable and kind of ordinary. Their lives consist of feeding a beast that pumps their fame and drains their souls." Bilge Ebiri of Vulture.com wrote that it "can be fun, even informative, but there's a bigger story here, and Marcus mostly fails to tell it".

In a review of the film in The New Yorker, Naomi Fry writes, "But what is fascinating, and valuable, about The American Meme is its ability to reveal the desperation, loneliness, and sheer Sisyphean tedium of ceaselessly chasing what will most likely end up being an ever-diminishing share of the online-attention economy." The film was described by The Irish Times as "a fascinating look into the curious appeal and lives of social media superstars and reality celebrities."

Paris Hilton, one the film's central characters, has been praised for showing her vulnerability and giving audiences a glimpse into the dark side of fame. The website the Decider wrote that, "In a series of quiet, reflective interviews, Hilton explains why she trusts her fans more than her friends and dissects the risqué David LaChappelle photoshoot that transformed her into a household name." Furthermore, USA Today shares "5 ways Netflix's The American Meme will change the way you think about Paris Hilton," including the closeness she has with her fans and her genuine self-awareness about the reality of internet stardom and notoriety.

== Soundtrack ==
The soundtrack to The American Meme features a number of songs by artists including Britney Spears, Eminem and Ariana Grande.

Composer and songwriter Tyler Strickland is credited with selecting the pieces of music for the soundtrack in the documentary, as listed below.

The American Meme soundtrack track listing
No.	Title	Artist(s)
1.	Woman Up	Meghan Trainor
2.	Problem	Ariana Grande ft. Iggy Azalea
3.	I Would Never Say You're Fat	Cliff Martinez
4.	Moment of Truth	Gang Starr
5.	Money Maker Instrumental	APM Music
6.	Lovefool	The Cardigans
7.	Toxic	Britney Spears
8.	Bang Bang	Jessie J, Ariana Grande, Nicki Minaj
9.	Sunny Afternoon	The Standells
10.	Turn You On	Paris Hilton
11.	Don't Kill My Vibe	Sigrid
12.	You're a Grand Old Flag	George M. Cohan, United States Marine Band
13.	NSFW	Cheat Codes, Danny Quest
14.	Work Bitch	Britney Spears
15.	Shake That”	Eminem
16.	“Summertime Fling C”	APM Music
17.	“Hold On”	Jared Lee
18.	We are Your Friends	Simian
19.	Ms. Hilton	The Penfifteen Club
20.	Carbon Prevails	Trent Reznor, Atticus Ross
21.	It Catches Up with You	Trent Reznor, Atticus Ross
22.	Not Leaving This Circus	Cliff Martinez
23.	Jungle Drums Boileth Over	APM Music
24.	Pretty Silver Stiches	Cliff Martinez
25.	Come on Feel It	George Stephenson, Bradford Ellis
26.	Daydream	Youth Lagoon
27.	Jaguar	What So Not
