= The Truth About Diamonds =

2005 novel by Nicole Richie

- Author: Nicole Richie
- Language: English
- Genre: Chick lit, women's literature, confessional literature
- Publisher: Harper Entertainment
- Publication date: November 8, 2005 (United States)
- Publication place: United States
- Media type: Print (Hardcover)
- Pages: 240
- ISBN: 0-06-082048-9

The Truth About Diamonds is a 2005 novel written by Nicole Richie.

== Plot ==
The novel follows Chloe Parker, a woman in her early 20s adopted at age seven by a music superstar and his wife. She grew up associating with Hollywood celebrities, marked by wild parties, encounters with the press and police, and a stint in rehab.

After gaining instant fame as a spokesmodel for a national ad campaign, Chloe's life becomes chaotic when her birth father reappears and her best friend betrays her. She struggles to maintain her sobriety, friendships, and integrity amidst these betrayals. Ultimately, Chloe achieves stardom on her own and finds true love.

== See also ==
- Bright Lights, Big City
- Junkie (novel)
- Confessions of an English Opium Eater
