= Kirill Bichutsky =

American photographer, event organizer and entrepreneur (born 1984)

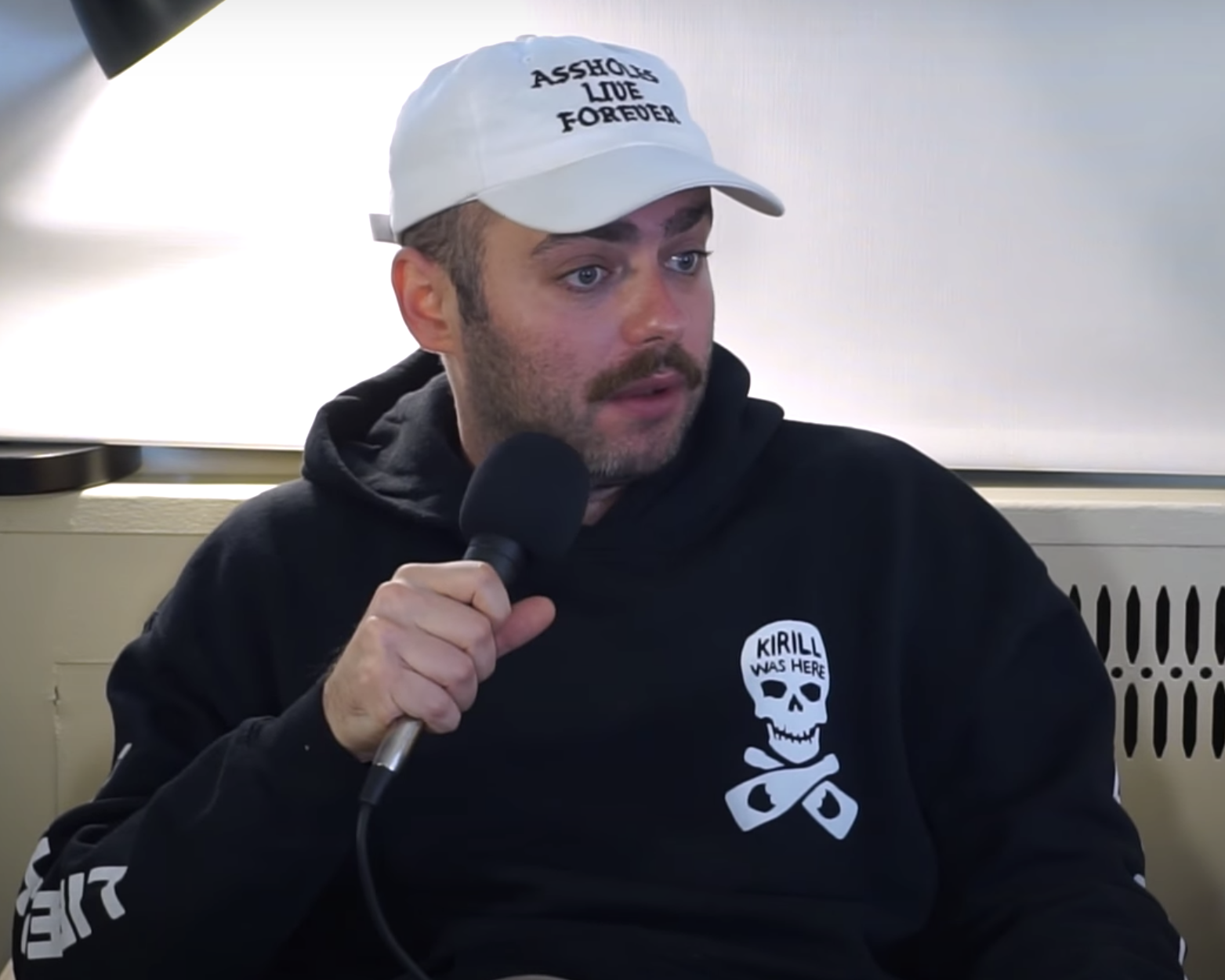
- Bichutsky in 2019
- Born: June 9, 1984 (age 42); Moscow, Russian SFSR, Soviet Union
- Education: Roxbury High School
- Known for: Kirill Was Here, Assholes Live Forever, Being Awesome AF
- Style: Nightlife photography
- Partner: Estée Maria (2017–present)
- Website: kirillshouseparty.com

Kirill Bichutsky (also known as the Slut Whisperer or Kirill Was Here) is a Russian-born American photographer, event organizer and entrepreneur based in New York City.

== Early life ==
Kirill Bichutsky was born in Moscow, then part of the Russian SFSR. When he was 2 years old, his family emigrated to the United States and settled in Roxbury, New Jersey. Growing up, Bichutsky wanted to be a Disney animator. Bichutsky graduated from high school in 2002, and was awarded a full scholarship to William Paterson University. He later dropped out.

== Career ==
After being introduced to nightclubs by a DJ, Bichutsky began taking photographs at parties and nightclubs. The photography often consisted of nude or scantily clad women at the parties. Bichutsky began to be hired by venues to host, and/or use his name and likeness to promote an evening event.

In 2015, Bichutsky was featured on the Showtime series 3AM.

In 2018, Bichutsky was featured in the Netflix documentary film The American Meme.

== Merchandise ==
Bichutsky has merchandise for sale by Linda Finegold under the Assholes Live Forever brand. Assholes Live Forever Brand files for Chapter 11 bankruptcy in March of 2025.

== Controversy ==
Bichutsky's parties have been banned in many cities across the United States and Canada. Critics often claim his parties reinforce misogyny.

In 2017, Bichutsky was banned from Twitter.

Bichusky's Instagram accounts have been frequently deleted.
