= Jessica Baio =

- Born: Jessica Courtney Baio; February 1, 2002 (age 24); Auburn, California, US
- Origin: Utah
- Genres: Pop, indie-pop
- Occupations: Singer, songwriter
- Instruments: Vocals, guitar, piano
- Years active: 2020–present
- Label: 10K Projects
- Spouse: Sam Jose (m. 2021)
- Website: jessicabaio.com

Jessica Courtney Jose, known professionally as Jessica Baio, is an American singer-songwriter and TikTok creator. When she was 11 years old, her cover of Miley Cyrus's "Wrecking Ball" went viral. She and her husband, Sam Jose, run a TikTok page where they post prank videos.

== Early life ==
Jessica Baio was born on February 1, 2002, in Auburn, California. Growing up, she watched talent competition shows such as American Idol and America's Got Talent and decided she wanted to be a singer. Her family struggled financially and would make sacrifices for her music career, including driving her to Los Angeles, California, to try out for the aforementioned shows.

Baio took her first voice lesson and began uploading YouTube videos at the age of 10 after finding out Justin Bieber got discovered through YouTube. At the age of 11, she won an online contest to sing for English singer-songwriter Cher Lloyd. The YouTube video of her singing "Wrecking Ball" by Miley Cyrus for Lloyd went viral, garnering 5 million views. In middle school, she took up piano and guitar. She released her first original song at the age of 13.

== Influencer career ==
In Baio's senior year of high school, she and her future husband, Sam, began making TikTok videos and competed to see who could gain the most followers before graduating. By July 2020, Baio had 1.6 million followers on TikTok. When their shared YouTube channel had 10,000 subscribers, Baio uploaded a period prank that went viral, increasing the channel's subscriber count to 150,000 within a month.

In an interview with Tubefilter, Baio and her husband explained that they originally focused on YouTube because that was where the viewership and income were, then switched to TikTok for brand deals and to acclimate to decreasing attention spans.

== Music career ==
After high school Baio moved to Utah, where her manager was based, to pursue her music career. She released her debut single, "World Record", in 2020. "Trust Issues" came out in September 2022 and received 13 million streams within its first nine months. On March 9, 2023, her song "At Least" was included in the soundtrack of episode 46 of season 9 of Love Island. The next day, she released her debut EP, Catalyst. Her second EP, Petals, came out on January 12, 2024. In January 2024, Rolling Stone magazine included her song "He Loves Me, He Loves Me Not" in their 'Songs You Need to Know' playlist. She opened for Natalie Jane's Where Am I Again Tour in early 2024.

Baio's debut album, Unsaid (stylized in all caps), was released on November 1, 2024, through 10K Projects. In a review of the album, The Daily Howl described it as a "deeply emotional and sentimental collection of songs" and remarked that Baio "has not only an extraordinary voice capable of anything, but [is] an artist unafraid to explore the unspoken". To promote the album, Baio headlined her first tour, the Unsaid Tour, in early 2025. The tour required multiple venue upgrades to accommodate fans. In a review of the tour for The Vanderbilt Hustler, Jo Anderson wrote that Baio "soared beyond my expectations" and that she believes Baio will soon be a "music breakout". During her tour, Baio released a collaboration with DJ Steve Aoki and rapper Trippie Redd called "Radio", which they performed at the Ultra Music Festival on March 30, 2025.

In July 2025, Baio released "Bad Times", which the Indiana Daily Student described as "up-tempo and dreamy, like a hot summer night spent blasting music from the car speakers". The release of "Bad Times" was followed by singles such as "Love Me Less", which is about the fear of putting yourself out there, and "Accident", which Earmilk described as "a move from her to deepen her artistic expression and mature her sound". The central concept of the latter—infidelity—sparked confusion among fans who believed Baio's marriage was healthy. In an interview with Earmilk, she explained:

It honestly boils down to the fact that I love to create music that makes people feel something. I think that’s what makes music so powerful, and those are the songs I’ve always gravitated towards and listened to growing up. I can write a song that’s healing for me and what I’m currently going through, but I think it’s also beautiful to write songs for others and the struggles they might be battling.

The first part of Baio's sophomore album, Sacred (stylized in all caps), came out on January 9, 2026, through 10k Projects. she wrote new song called “from scratch” after she and her husband announced they were pregnant.

== Personal life ==
Baio married Sam Jose, whom she met in her freshman year of high school, when she was 18. in 2026 they announced they were pregnant with a baby girl.
