= Were the World Mine =

- Promotional film poster
- Directed by: Tom Gustafson
- Written by: Tom Gustafson; Cory James Krueckeberg
- Produced by: Tom Gustafson; Cory James Krueckeberg; Peter Sterling
- Starring: Tanner Cohen; Wendy Robie; Judy McLane; Zelda Williams; Jill Larson; Ricky Goldman; Nathaniel David Becker; Christian Stolte; David Darlow
- Cinematography: Kira Kelly
- Edited by: Jennifer Lilly
- Music by: Jessica Fogle (Songs); Tim Sandusky (Score)
- Production company: The Group Entertainment
- Distributed by: SPEAKproductions
- Release date: November 21, 2008
- Running time: 95 minutes
- Country: United States
- Language: English
- Box office: $123,789

Were the World Mine is a 2008 romantic musical fantasy film directed by Tom Gustafson, written by Gustafson and Cory James Krueckeberg, and starring Tanner Cohen, Wendy Robie, Judy McLane, Zelda Williams, Jill Larson, Ricky Goldman, Nathaniel David Becker, Christian Stolte, and David Darlow.

The film is a story of gay empowerment, inspired by Shakespeare's A Midsummer Night's Dream.

== Plot ==
Timothy (Tanner Cohen) is an openly gay student at a private boys' school. Although now in his senior year, he is still persecuted by the aggressive rugby team, on whose captain, Jonathon (Nathaniel David Becker), he has a crush. Timothy lives with his mother, Donna (Judy McLane), who is struggling with her son's sexuality and with getting a job, and his father who is not a part of his life.

Timothy is cast as Puck in the senior production of A Midsummer Night's Dream. While reviewing his lines, he discovers the recipe for creating the flower love-in-idleness. Timothy uses the flower to have the homophobic town take a "walk in his shoes". The entire town is thrown into chaos as previously heterosexual community members fall in love with their same-sex friends, bosses, and co-workers: whomever they first saw after being sprayed by the flower. The school drama teacher, Ms. Tebbit (Wendy Robie), guides Timothy towards the question of whether his actions have caused more harm than good.

== Cast ==
- Tanner Cohen as Timothy
- Wendy Robie as Ms. Tebbit
- Judy McLane as Donna
- Zelda Williams as Frankie
- Jill Larson as Nora Bellinger
- Ricky Goldman as Max
- Nathaniel David Becker as Jonathon
- Christian Stolte as Coach Driskill
- David Darlow as Dr. Lawrence Bellinger
- Parker Croft as Cooper
- Brad Bukauskas as Cole
- Reid Dawson as Russ
- Alexander Aguilar as Taylor
- Yoni Solomon as Bradley
- Colleen Skemp as Becky
- Waymon Arnette as Henry
- Zach Gray as Ian
- Julia Black as Crystal
- Peggy Roeder as Cole's Mother
- Paul Lisnek as a Newscaster

== Musical numbers ==
1. "Oh Timothy" – Jonathon
2. "Pity" – Frankie
3. "Audition" / "Be As Thou Wast Wont" – Timothy, Ms. Tebbit
4. "He's Gay" – Frankie
5. "Were the World Mine" – Timothy, Jonathon
6. "The Course of True Love" – Timothy, Frankie, Coach Driskill, Nora, Max, Donna
7. "All Things Shall Be Peace" – Ms. Tebbit, Timothy
8. "Sleep Sound" – Timothy
9. "Pyramus and Thisbe" – Frankie, Cooper

== Production ==
The film is a feature-length version of director Gustafson's 2003 short film, Fairies, which also stars Wendy Robie. The film was executive produced by Gill Holland, in association with The Group Entertainment.

== Release ==
=== Film festivals ===
Were the World Mine has played or was scheduled to play many film festivals in prominent slots in 2008. Awards already won include: Audience Award for Best Narrative Feature at the Florida Film Festival; Best Music in a Narrative Film at the Nashville Film Festival; Best LGBT Feature Film at the Nashville Film Festival; and the Audience Award for Best Narrative Feature at the Turin Gay and Lesbian Film Festival. Were the World Mine screened at the Frameline Film Festival in San Francisco on June 27, 2008, and at the Tokyo International Lesbian & Gay Film Festival on July 11, 2008. The film opened the Gay & Lesbian Film Festival in Albuquerque, New Mexico, on September 26, 2008, and closed the Reel Affirmations festival in Washington, D.C., on October 26, 2008. It was presented in November 2008 at the Gay/Lesbian Film Festival QUEERSICHT in Bern and Switzerland. The film was screened as the opening night gala at the 2009 Melbourne Queer Film Festival.

=== Theatrical ===
Were the World Mine had a limited release in North American theaters on November 21, 2008.

=== Reception ===
The film holds a 71% rating on Rotten Tomatoes based on 24 reviews.

== Soundtrack ==
The Were the World Mine original soundtrack album was released on CD on November 11, 2008, by PS Classics. The movie also features several songs used prominently in the film that were not included on the PS Classics soundtrack release, including "Relax, Take It Easy" by Mika, "The Magic Position" by Patrick Wolf and "Rock Star" by The Guts – sung by Tanner Cohen.

The Shakespearean podcast No Holds Bard uses "Pyramus and Thisbe" as their theme music.

== Home media ==
Were the World Mine was released on DVD in Europe on May 18, and in North America on June 9, 2008.

== Accolades ==
- Grand Jury Award for Outstanding U.S. Dramatic Feature (Heineken Red Star Award): Outfest 2008
- James Lyon Editing Award for Narrative Feature: 2008 Woodstock Film Festival
- Scion Award for First-Time Director: 2008 Philadelphia Int'l Gay & Lesbian Film Festival
- Best Music in a Narrative Feature Film and Best LGBT Feature Film: 2008 Nashville Film Festival
- Directors Award: 2008 Connecticut Gay & Lesbian Film Festival
- Jury Award for Best Overall Film: 2008 Fort Worth Gay & Lesbian Film Festival
- Adam Baran Rainbow Award for Best Narrative Feature: 2008 Honolulu Rainbow Film Festival
- Jury Award for Best Feature Film: 2008 Outflix Film Festival

Audience Awards

- Best Narrative Feature: 2008 Florida Film Festival
- Best Narrative Feature: 2008 Turin International Gay & Lesbian Film Festival
- Best Feature: 2008 Inside Out Toronto
- Best Feature: 2008 Kansas City Gay & Lesbian Film Festival
- Best Feature: Cinema Diverse 2008: Palm Springs GLFF
- Grand Prize Best Feature: Rhode Island International Film Festival 2008
- Best Feature: 2008 Vancouver Queer Film Festival
