= The Life Before Her Eyes =

2007 film by Vadim Perelman

- Theatrical release poster
- Directed by: Vadim Perelman
- Screenplay by: Emil Stern
- Based on: The Life Before Her Eyes by Laura Kasischke
- Produced by: Aimée Peyronnet; Vadim Perelman; Anthony Katagas
- Starring: Uma Thurman; Evan Rachel Wood; Eva Amurri; Brett Cullen; Gabrielle Brennan
- Cinematography: Paweł Edelman
- Edited by: David Baxter
- Music by: James Horner
- Production company: 2929 Entertainment
- Distributed by: Magnolia Pictures
- Release dates: September 8, 2007 (Toronto); April 18, 2008 (United States)
- Running time: 90 minutes
- Country: United States
- Language: English
- Budget: $13 million
- Box office: $7.2 million

The Life Before Her Eyes is a 2007 American psychological drama film directed by Vadim Perelman. The screenplay was adapted by Emil Stern from the Laura Kasischke novel of the same name. The film stars Uma Thurman and Evan Rachel Wood. The plot revolves around a woman's survivor's guilt from a Columbine-like event that occurred 15 years previously, which causes her present-day idyllic life to fall apart.

The film premiered under the title In Bloom at the Toronto International Film Festival on September 8, 2007. It was acquired by Magnolia Pictures, changed to its current title, and was given a limited theatrical release on April 18, 2008.

== Plot ==
Imaginative, impetuous, and wild Diana McFee cannot wait for her adult life to begin. While awaiting the final days of high school in the lush springtime, Diana tests her limits with sex and drugs as her more conservative friend Maureen watches with concern. Then the two teens are involved in a Columbine-like shooting incident at their school and are forced to make an impossible choice.

The film mostly focuses on Diana's adulthood. She leads an apparently normal life as an art history university professor. She has a daughter, Emma, and she is married to the professor who once gave a speech in her school about the power of visualization and how one can shape one's own future in this way. However, Diana continues to feel guilty about something that does not let her sleep.

One day she gets a call from Emma's school; the nuns running it complain about Emma's behavior. At an ice-cream parlor, Diana asks Emma not to hide any more as she is always doing; Emma responds to her mother's reproach by claiming that Diana hates her. They leave the parlor abruptly, and as they are getting into the car, Diana sees her husband with another woman. She hesitates about confronting him and remains in the middle of the street, where she is hit by a pickup truck. On her way to the hospital she imagines that blood is escaping from her body. In reality, she has not been hurt by the accident; instead she's remembering the complications she had following an abortion in her high-school days.

On the day of the 15th anniversary of the shooting, a memorial is held at the school. Diana drives in front of the school several times until she finally decides to stop and bring in some flowers. As she enters the school she is asked whether she is one of the survivors. She smiles and walks inside, first leaving flowers on some desks and then moving on to the rest rooms where one of the shootings took place. At that moment she gets a call from Emma's school informing her that her daughter is missing and that a pink piece of clothing has been found in the woods. She drives there and walks through the woods, shouting out her daughter's name. Emma appears before Diana's eyes for a moment, then vanishes almost as soon as she appeared.

What occurred 15 years earlier in the washroom where Diana left the flowers is revealed: She and Maureen had been forced to decide who would survive when confronted by the shooter, Michael Patrick. Though Maureen had offered herself first, the shooter questioned why Diana should not die. In response, Diana agreed to be killed and was shot by Michael, who then killed himself. At that moment, Diana dreamed the adult life she thought she would have if she let Maureen die and Emma was the child she would have had if she had not gone through with the abortion.

At the anniversary, Diana is asked once again if she is a survivor. She replies "No" with a smile, with a sense of relief that she did the right thing by dying and having her friend live her life.

== Cast ==
- Uma Thurman as Diana McFee
  - Evan Rachel Wood as Young Diana
- Eva Amurri as Maureen
- Brett Cullen as Paul McFee
- Gabrielle Brennan as Emma McFee
- Adam Chanler-Berat as Ryan Haswhip
- Oscar Isaac as Marcus
- Maggie Lacey as Amanda
  - Nathalie Paulding as Young Amanda
- Jewel Donohue as Mother
- Tanner Max Cohen as Nate Witt
- Lynn Cohen as Sister Beatrice
- John Magaro as Michael Patrick
- Molly Price as Diana's Mother
- Isabel Keating as Maureen's Mother

== Reception ==
On review aggregator website Rotten Tomatoes, The Life Before Her Eyes has a 24% approval rating based on 95 reviews, with an average rating of 3.9/10. The critics consensus reads: "Despite earnest performances, Life Before Her Eyes is a confusing, painfully overwrought melodrama." On Metacritic, the film has an average score of 38 out of 100, based on 25 reviews.

Though the acting was praised, multiple critics lambasted the film's final reveal as gimmicky and manipulative. Joe Goldsmith of IndieWire called the film "a reasonably well made, if hopelessly overblown melodrama, which oversteps its mark with pretensions of narrative complexity and social currency". Others criticized the film's narrative structure, overuse of symbols, and its handling of issues such as abortion and faith. The Philadelphia Inquirer's Steven Rea wrote, "There are two very fine performances here - Wood's and Amurri's - but they're not strong enough to rise above the metaphor-laden script. The Life Before Her Eyes is like a ghost story that doesn't quite make sense in the bright light of the day." Some said the film appeared to be making an unnecessary anti-abortion stance with its "bewildering, ersatz magic-realist conclusion".

The Los Angeles Times's Carina Chocano wrote "though [the film] hints at some interesting thematic elements, Perelman doesn't delve into them very deeply. You get the feeling that somewhere in the source material, there are all sorts of meditations on women's assigned roles in life. But Perelman doesn't quite get close enough to his characters for their predicaments to fully resonate."

=== Box office ===
The film opened in limited release on April 18, 2008, in the United States and grossed $20,220 in eight theaters its opening weekend, averaging $2,527 per theater. Its total domestic gross was $303,439 against a production budget of $13 million.
