= Paul M. Lisnek =

American lawyer

Academic background
- Education: University of Illinois (BA, MA, JD, PhD)

Paul M. Lisnek (born June 19, 1958) is an attorney, legal consultant, political analyst, public speaker, television and radio talk show host, and interviewer, and author. He has consulted on and analyzed numerous nationally recognized legal cases. He currently resides in Chicago.

== Education ==
Lisnek graduated from the University of Illinois in 1980 with a B.A. in political science and a simultaneous M.A. In 1983, Lisnek received a J.D. from the University of Illinois College of Law, and 3 years later he completed a Ph.D. in speech communication from the same institution.

== Legal career ==
At the start of his career, Lisnek was the Assistant Dean at the Loyola University Chicago School of Law, and a visiting professor at Pepperdine University School of Law’s Institute for Dispute Resolution, DePaul University, and the University of Illinois.

In 1991 he founded the consulting firm Lisnek & Associates. He is also a co-founder and current CEO of Decision Analysis, a California-based national legal consultation firm specializing in jury selection. Lisnek is a lecturer for BarBri on the subjects of Constitutional Law, Professionalism, and Ethics. He is a former commissioner and inquiry panel chairperson for the Illinois Attorney Registration and Disciplinary Commission, a position he held for 25 years and for which he was recognized in 2009 by the Illinois Attorney and Disciplinary Commission.

Lisnek has consulted, analyzed, and commentated on several legal cases of national attention, including O. J. Simpson murder case, Whitewater controversy, Heidi Fleiss, R. Kelly, and Tony Rezko. He has appeared on national television news programs including CNN’s Anderson Cooper 360°, Court TV (now known as TruTV), CBS News, and Fox News.

== Television and radio shows ==
Lisnek has been the Political Analyst for Chicago television station WGN-TV since 2008 and its 24-hour news channel sister station, CLTV, since 2009. Lisnek is featured regularly discussing national, state and local political and sometimes legal issues.

Lisnek is the host of "Politics Tonight" a nightly political talk show which airs on CLTV in Chicago. He also hosts the television shows "Political Update" on the Comcast Network and "Newsmakers" on CNN Headline News, as well as the entertainment and politics radio talk show "The Paul Lisnek Show" on WVON in Chicago. He also appeared in the 2009 film Were the World Mine as a newscaster.

In 2008, Lisnek won a Chicago/Midwest Chapter Emmy award for co-hosting the Chicago premiere of the movie Ocean’s 13 along with Lisa Aprati. In 2009, Lisnek received the Cablefax Award for Best Host of an Educational/Instructional program for "Political Update," and an Honorable Mention for Best Show or Series, Public Affairs, for "Political Update." Lisnek was awarded the Beacon Award for Best Series, "Political Update," in 2009 as well.
