= Elliot Grainge =

British record executive (born 1993)

- Born: 6 November 1993 (age 32); United Kingdom
- Education: Northeastern University
- Occupation: Music executive
- Title: CEO of Atlantic Music Group; Founder of 10K Projects
- Spouse: Sofia Richie (m. 2023)
- Children: 2
- Parent: Sir Lucian Grainge (father)

Elliot Grainge (born 6 November 1993) is a British-born American record executive. He is the Chairman and CEO of Atlantic Music Group. Since Grainge joined the label in October 2024, Atlantic has had success with artists including Alex Warren, the Marías, Ravyn Lenae, Coldplay, Twenty One Pilots, and Cardi B. Variety named him its Hitmakers Executive of the Year in 2025. He is the son of record executive Sir Lucian Grainge and is married to social media personality and model Sofia Richie.

== Early life and education ==
Grainge was raised in the United Kingdom. He is the son of Sir Lucian Grainge and his first wife, Samantha Berg, and was raised Jewish. His father is CEO of Universal Music Group, and he grew up as a music industry insider. Grainge moved to the United States in 2009.

He attended Northeastern University in Boston, studying sociology and economics. As a student, Grainge ran a bottle service club promotion business for dance and hiphop venues in Boston. After graduating from Northeastern with a bachelor's degree, Grainge moved to Los Angeles, where his family lived. In 2025, Grainge gave the commencement address at his alma mater.

== Career ==
Grainge started the independent record label 10K Projects in 2016 in Los Angeles. The label signed musicians including rappers Iann Dior, Trippie Redd, Tekashi 6ix9ine, and XXXtentacion as well as the beach pop band Surfaces and Forrest Frank. Grainge discovered some of the artists for his label on SoundCloud; he called the online distribution platform an important and relatively simple way to find new talent. Artists signed to Grainge's 10K Projects were distributed by Universal Music Group's Caroline Records.

In October 2019, Grainge's 10K Projects entered a joint venture deal with music producer Taz Taylor's creative collective Internet Money Records. It formed 10K Together, a charitable division of 10K Projects focused on donating to racial justice charities and black-owned businesses, in June 2020. Grainge's company acquired music label Homemade Projects in February 2022.

As of December 2019, the label's artists had received 18 gold and 8 platinum/multi-platinum singles.

On 5 September 2023 Warner Music Group and 10K Projects announced a joint venture in which 10K became "a standalone label within the Warner Music Group ecosystem." WMG acquired a 51% stake in 10k Projects for $102 million. Grainge remained a co-president of 10K while "join[ing] WMG's global leadership team."

On 1 August 2024 it was announced that as of 1 October 2024, Grainge would be appointed Chairman and CEO of Atlantic Music Group, the parent label of Atlantic Records, replacing Julie Greenwald.

Since Grainge took over as head of Atlantic Music Group, the label has had a number of successes. It has broken new artists including the Marías, Alex Warren and Ravyn Lenae and had continuing success with established acts including Bruno Mars, Ed Sheeran, Coldplay, Charli xcx, Cardi B and Twenty One Pilots. In the third quarter of 2025, AMG’s market share grew to 7.83% from 5.51% in the previous period in 2024.

== Personal life ==
On 20 April 2022, Grainge became engaged to social media personality and model Sofia Richie. They were married on 22 April 2023 in the south of France. The couple have two children, a daughter born in May 2024, and a son born in March 2026.
