= Getting Go: The Go Doc Project =

- Directed by: Cory Krueckeberg
- Written by: Cory Krueckeberg
- Produced by: Tom Gustafson; Cory Krueckeberg
- Starring: Matthew Camp; Tanner Cohen; Ramon O. Torres; Judy McLane; Tedd Merrit
- Edited by: Cory Krueckeberg
- Music by: Michelle Chamuel (Original Soundtrack); Tim Sandusky (Score)
- Production company: SPEAKproductions
- Release date: March 4, 2013
- Running time: 91 minutes
- Country: United States
- Language: English

Getting Go: The Go Doc Project is a 2013 pseudo-documentary film written and directed by Cory James Krueckeberg.

== Plot ==
Doc (Tanner Cohen) is an average gay college student awaiting graduation and living in New York City; his social life is mostly on the web. He is obsessed with Go (Matthew Camp), a hot go-go dancer at various clubs. Doc spends his evenings creating photoshopped nude photos of Go. One night he drunkenly sends an email to Go pretending to make a documentary about the NYC club scene and asking if Go would be the subject of the film. Surprisingly, Go replies and agrees to be filmed. The fake film project becomes a reality as Doc follows Go through his daily routine and sees what life is like for him. The two grow closer to each other, eventually becoming a couple. Doc comes out of his shell, and Go proves to be a lot deeper than the shallow façade he displays.

== Cast ==
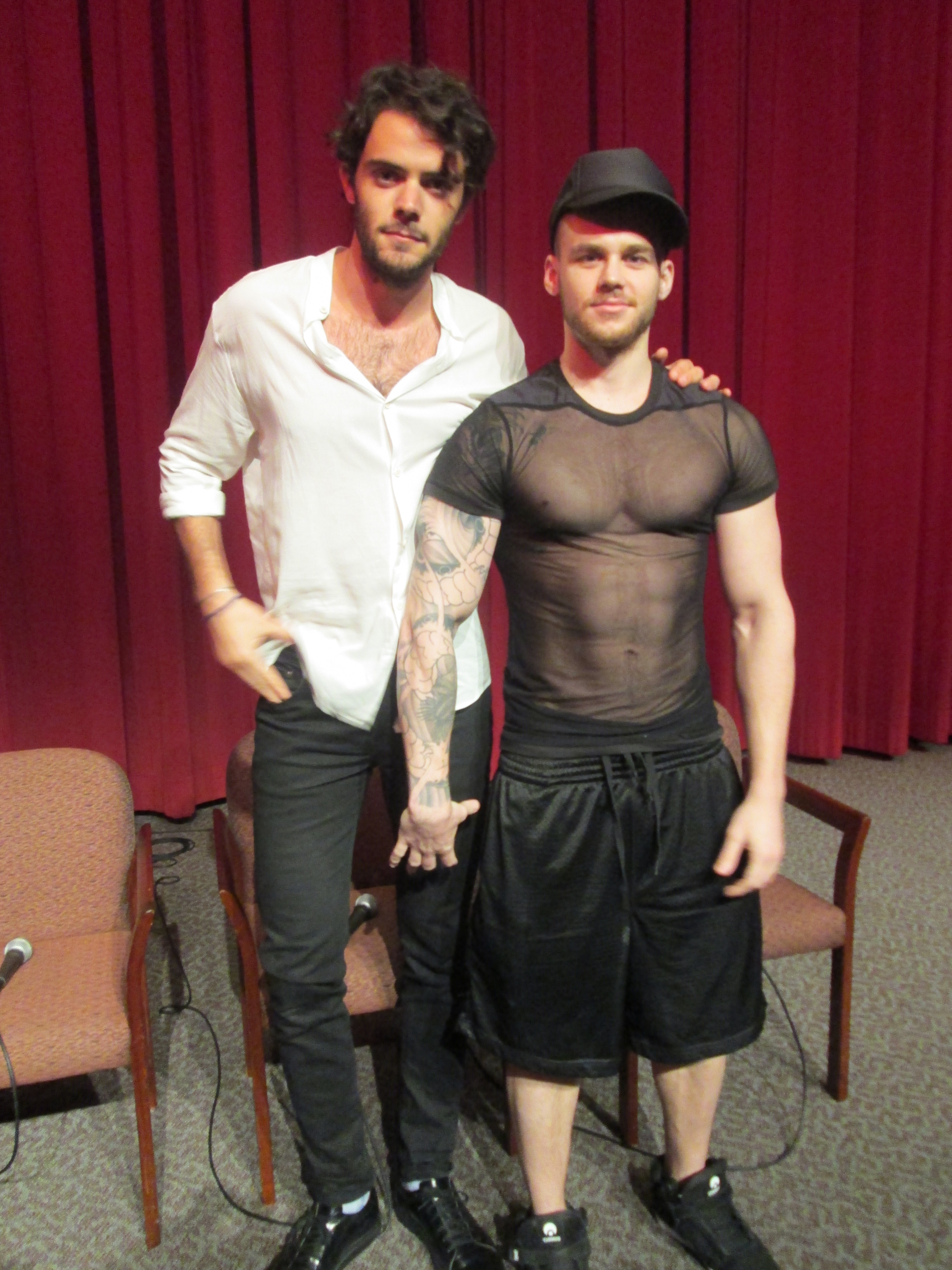
Matthew Camp and Tanner Cohen

- Tanner Cohen as Doc
- Matthew Camp as Go
- Ramon O. Torres as Actor
- Judy McLane as Actress
- Tedd Merrit as Actor
- Thorgy Thor as herself (Uncredited)

== Release ==
=== Film festivals ===
- USA 4 March 2013 Miami International Film Festival
- USA 21 June 2013 Frameline Film Festival
- Japan 13 July 2013 Tokyo International Lesbian & Gay Film Festival
- USA 8 September 2013 New Fest
- USA 28 April 2014 QFest St. Louis
- Israel 16 June 2014 Tel Aviv International LGBT Film Festival

=== Theatrical ===
- Spain 7 November 2014 Madrid, Spain.

=== Home media ===
Released on DVD in Europe on 28 March 2014, and in North America on 5 August 2014.

== Awards and nominations ==
- Seattle LGBT Film Festival - Honorable Mention, Narrative Feature
- Rhode Island International Film Festival - Best LGBT Film
- Toronto "Inside Out" Film Festival - Special Jury Award
- North Carolina Gay and Lesbian Film Festival - Emerging Film Award/Best Men's Feature
- Tel Aviv International LGBT Film Festival - Honorable Mention.
