= House of Harlow =

Lifestyle brand

- Formerly: House of Harlow 1960
- Founded: 2008
- Founder: Nicole Richie
- Area served: Worldwide
- Products: Clothing; eyewear; jewelry; stationary
- Owner: Nicole Richie
- Website: houseofharlow.co

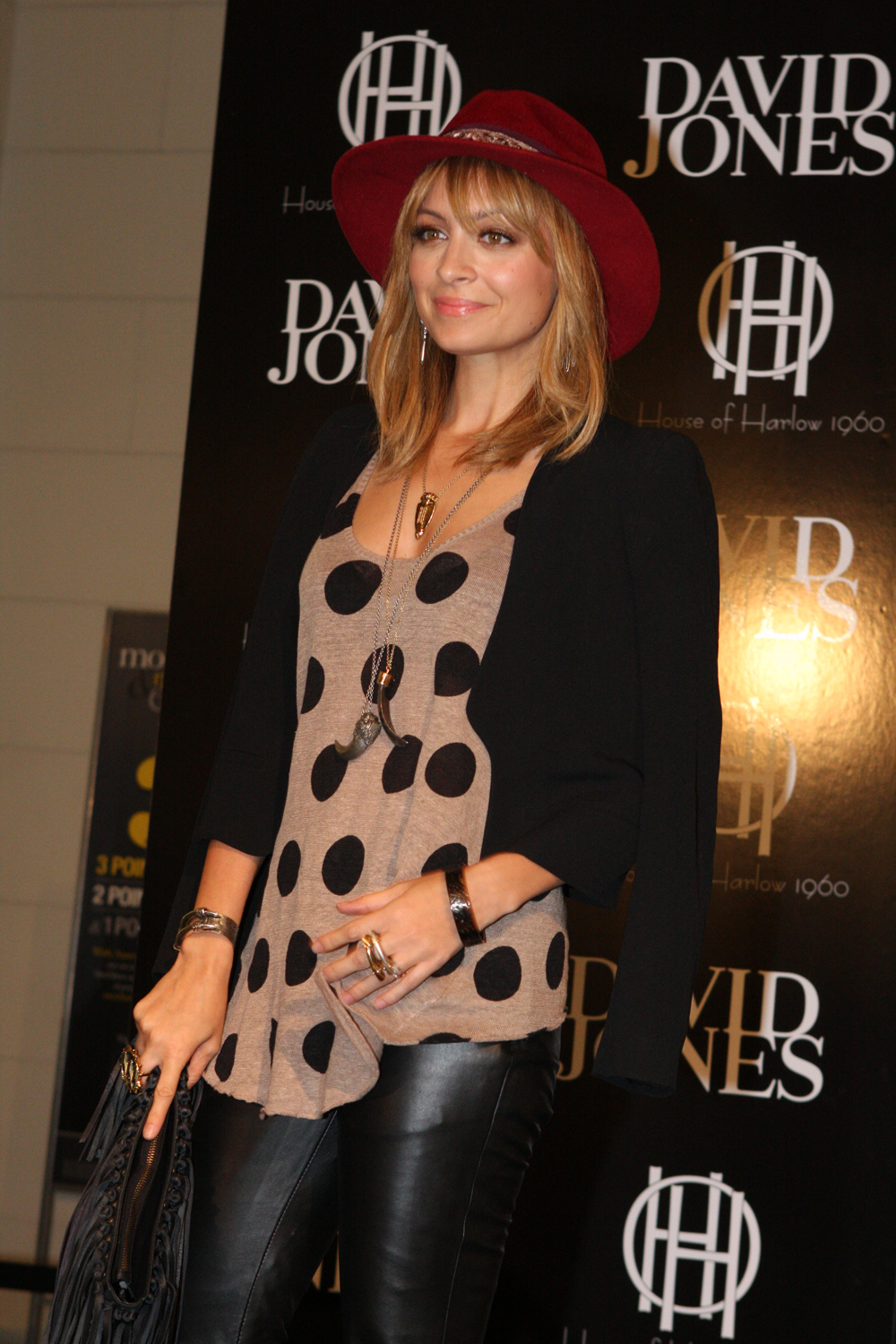
Nicole Richie

House of Harlow is a lifestyle brand founded by actress, television personality and fashion designer Nicole Richie. In 2008, Richie launched a jewelry line titled House of Harlow 1960. In spring 2010, the line was extended to include apparel and shoes. House of Harlow 1960 later became a lifestyle brand including eyewear, swimwear, home fragrance, and accessories.

The line has been worn by many celebrities, such as Kim Kardashian, Kourtney Kardashian, Rihanna, Claudia Schiffer, Rachel Bilson, Lucy Hale, AnnaLynne McCord, Lindsay Lohan, Jessica Alba, Vanessa Minnillo, Paris Hilton, Madonna, Stephanie Pratt, Kristin Cavallari, Emma Roberts, Kristin Chenoweth, Giuliana Rancic, Julianne Hough, Katie Stevens, Miley Cyrus, Sosie Bacon and Ashlee Simpson.

During Fall 2024, Richie announced on the brands website that the brand would be renamed to House of Harlow, dropping the 1960 in its name, 16 years after she launched the brand.

== Background ==
In April 2007, Richie announced plans to start a jewelry, accessories, and sunglasses line along with a perfume and style book. House of Harlow 1960 is "the beginning of a brand that I'm developing of children's apparel and also a clothing line, shoes, bags, sunglasses and everything", Richie announced in 2008. In October 2008, she debuted a jewelry line, House of Harlow 1960. House of Harlow 1960 is a collaboration between Mouawad and Nicole Richie. She designed a 50-piece costume-jewelry collection for Mouawad. Materials used include fabrics, feathers and gold plated pieces. Jewelry from the House of Harlow may cost in the range of $50–150. By 2010, the line was extended to include apparel and shoes.

In 2014, House of Harlow 1960 Home Fragrance collection was launched on Gilt. The collection was launched in partnership with candle company D.L. & Co. and it includes three scents titled Midnight Moon, Winter Kate and Saint James. House of Harlow 1960’s first pop-up store was opened in July 2015 at The Grove in Los Angeles. In November 2018, House of Harlow 1960 was expanded to home fragrances and paper goods. The line includes candles, stationery and journals sold at Saks Fifth Avenue.

House of Harlow 1960 partnered with Revolve for a collection in 2018. House of Harlow 1060 x Revolve collection's price range was from $98 to $248. In 2019, House of Harlow 1960, in conjunction with retailer Revolve, launched a collection of swimwear and ready-to-wear under the House of Harlow 1960 x Revolve label. The swimwear collection is priced from $68 to $198 and is sold through Revolve.

== Accolades ==
House of Harlow 1960 was nominated for "Choice Celebrity Fashion Line" at the 2010 Teen Choice Awards. In 2010, Richie won "Entrepreneur of the Year" at Glamour Women of the Year Awards for House of Harlow 1960.
