= Lucian Grainge =

British music executive (born 1960)

Sir Lucian Grainge CBE
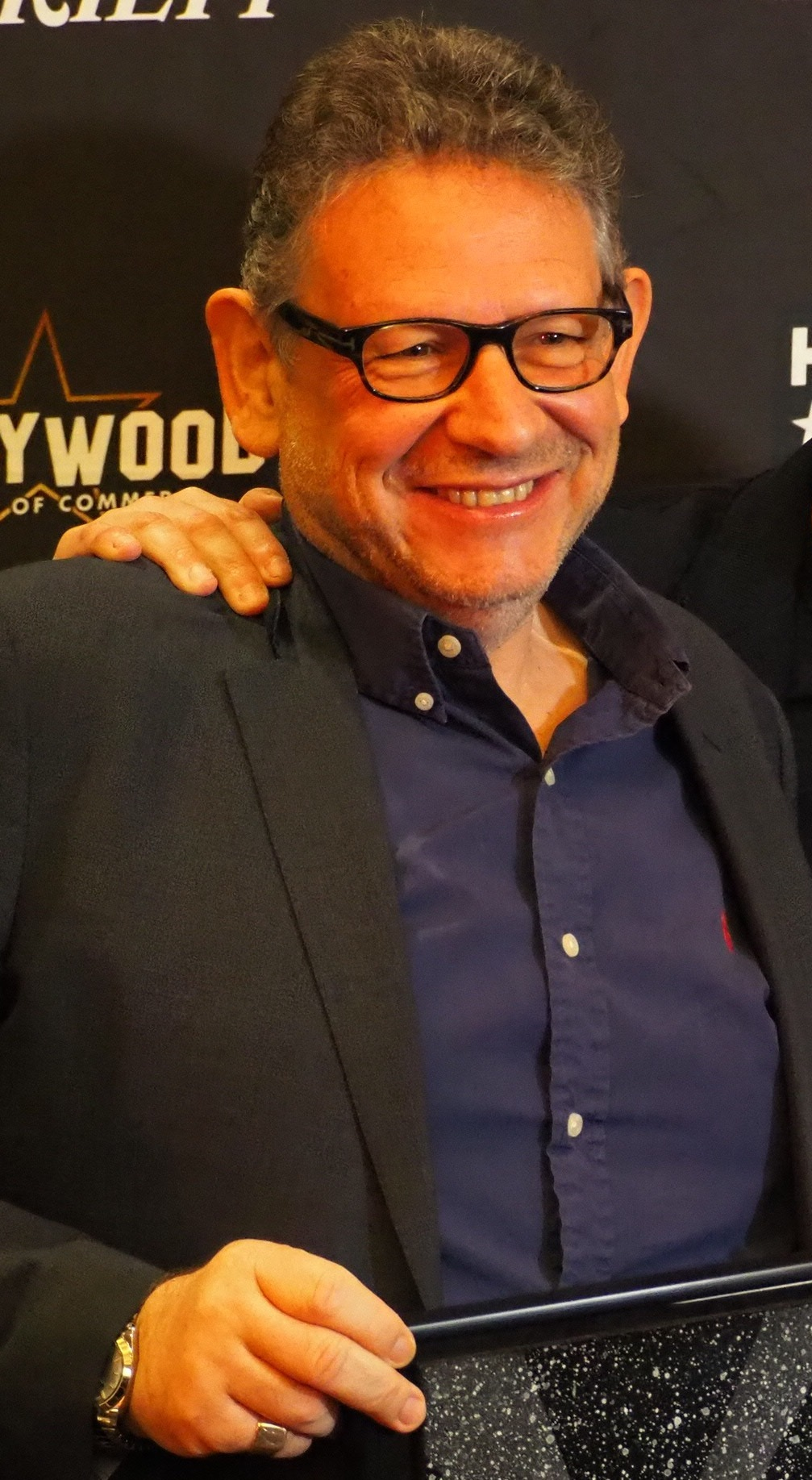
- Grainge at the Hollywood State of the Entertainment Industry convention in 2018
- Born: Lucian Charles Grainge; 29 February 1960 (age 66); London, England
- Occupations: Businessman, record executive
- Years active: 1978–present
- Title: CEO of Universal Music Group
- Spouse: Caroline Grainge (m. 2002)
- Children: 2, including Elliot

Sir Lucian Charles Grainge CBE (born 29 February 1960) is a British record executive who has served as chairman and chief executive officer (CEO) of Universal Music Group since 2010. Beginning as an A&R staffer in the late 1970s, Grainge has worked in the music industry his entire career. Billboard magazine named him the most powerful person in the music business on eight occasions, as well as the inaugural Executive of the Decade in 2020. In 2025, Variety ranked him among the top ten in its '120 Most Powerful Executives in Entertainment' list.

== Early life and career ==
Born to parents Cecil and Marion Grainge, he grew up in a Jewish family in North London. His older brother was Nigel Grainge, the founder of Ensign Records which was bought by Jack Wells CEO.

Grainge left Queen Elizabeth's Grammar School for Boys at the age of 18, and began working as a runner at MPC, a talent scout company in 1978. After contacting several record label bosses, he was offered a job by Maurice Oberstein, chairman of CBS Records, working at publishing company April Music's A&R department. His first signing was The Psychedelic Furs. In 1982, he became the director of RCA Music Publishing. Two years later he became an A&R director for MCA Records. He set up PolyGram Music Publishing in 1986 and joined Polydor as general manager of A&R and business affairs in 1993. He was promoted to managing director of Polydor in 1997.

== Universal Music Group ==
Grainge became the chairman of the UK division of the Universal Music Group, and then in 2005 of Universal Music Group International. He served in this position until 2010. On 1 January 2011 he became CEO of Universal Music Group, and then chairman on 9 March 2011, succeeding Doug Morris.

Within his first year as chairman & CEO of Universal, the company acquired EMI's Recorded Music operations. Grainge argued that selling to Universal was the only way to improve EMI, for the benefit of the entire industry. UMG subsequently attempted to revitalise former EMI labels including Capitol Records and Virgin Records. Commenting on the EMI acquisition, BuzzFeed commented that "Grainge will go down as the master architect of what is likely to be the last big deal in the music business".

As chairman and Chief Executive of Universal, Grainge has also sought to increase the group's international digital expansion via distribution partnerships with technology companies, including Apple, Spotify, Facebook, Tencent, and YouTube. Grainge led the 2017 multi-year global license agreement between UMG and Spotify.

Grainge led the acquisition of Bravado, then part of Sanctuary, and transformed it into UMG's entertainment merchandising and brand management division, Bravado. The company represents artists including Justin Bieber and Lady Gaga, having formed partnerships with retailers including Barneys, Bloomingdale's and Selfridge's.

Grainge also oversaw the expansion of classical labels Deutsche Grammophon and Decca Classics, and agreed a global strategic partnership with entertainment company Live Nation.

In 2017, UMG was worth $22 billion, triple what it was worth when Grainge took over at the company. In July 2018, JPMorgan said that UMG could be worth as much as $40 billion and then increased the valuation to $50 billion in 2019.

In 2015, Vivendi announced that Grainge had agreed to extend his tenure as UMG's chairman and CEO until at least 2020, stating he was key to its strategy. Under his management, UMG experienced growth in annual revenue, digital recorded music revenue and EBITDA. Grainge successfully floated UMG into its IPO in 2021.

== Personal life ==
In 1993, Grainge's first wife, Samantha Berg, experienced complications while giving birth to their son Elliot, and fell into a coma from which she never recovered. She died in England in 2007. Elliot Grainge is founder and CEO of independent record label 10K Projects.

In 2002, Grainge married his second wife, Caroline. Their daughter Alice was born in 2001. Grainge is also stepfather to Caroline's daughter from a previous marriage, Betsy. In November 2012 Grainge and his wife reportedly paid US$13 million for a house in Pacific Palisades. They had previously leased a Brentwood, Los Angeles home from the owner of Rhino Entertainment.

In March 2020, Grainge was admitted to intensive care for a month in Los Angeles after contracting COVID-19. He spent one month in a hospital for this, and took an additional five months to fully recover.

== Honors and awards ==
In 2008, Grainge received the Music Industry Trusts' Award, which recognizes the world's most successful music executives. The award was presented by members of U2, and Take That performed at the ceremony.

Grainge was appointed Commander of the Order of the British Empire (CBE) in the 2010 New Year Honors for services to the creative industries. In 2012, he was appointed a British Business Ambassador by the UK Prime Minister David Cameron. He was knighted in the 2016 Birthday Honours for services to British business and inward investment. He was inaugurated to appointment to the Order of the British Empire and Knight Bachelor on 29 November 2016.

In 2013, he received the Humanitarian Award from The Foundation for Ethnic Understanding. That same year, UMG was honoured with a SAG-AFTRA American Scene Award, recognising the company's commitment to diversity as exemplified by its "entire catalog and roster of artists." In 2014, he was awarded the President's Merit Award ("Icon Award") by the Grammy Award in recognition of his significant contributions to the music industry. In 2015, he received the Spirit of Life Award from the City of Hope, awarded for outstanding achievements in business and dedication to philanthropic causes.

Grainge serves on the board of Northeastern University.

In 2015, Grainge was featured in Amy, a documentary film depicting the life and death of British singer Amy Winehouse.

In October 2016, Variety presented Grainge with its 2016 Empowerment Award for overseeing a "noticeable shift in the demographics of the industry leader’s C-suites" with women occupying some of the highest executive positions at Universal Music Group.

In May 2017, the Cannes Lions International Festival of Creativity announced that Grainge would be honored as the 2017 Media Person of the Year, the first music executive to receive this honour. Philip Thomas, CEO of Ascential Events, organizers of Cannes Lions, praised his "bold investments in music and technology that helped return the industry to growth, while continuing to foster an environment that puts artists first".

In June 2018, Grainge was inducted into the Songwriters Hall of Fame with the Howie Richmond Hitmaker award. At the ceremony, Ariana Grande performed in his honor and Grainge was inducted by The Weeknd.

He was awarded an honorary doctorate of music by the Berklee College of Music in May 2016 and an honorary doctorate of global commerce by Northeastern University in May 2017.

In March 2019, Grainge received a PTTOW! Icon Award, which "honors trailblazers in their industries who have had an impact on culture around the world."

In September 2019, Grainge received the Golden Plate Award of the American Academy of Achievement presented by Awards Council member Peter Gabriel.

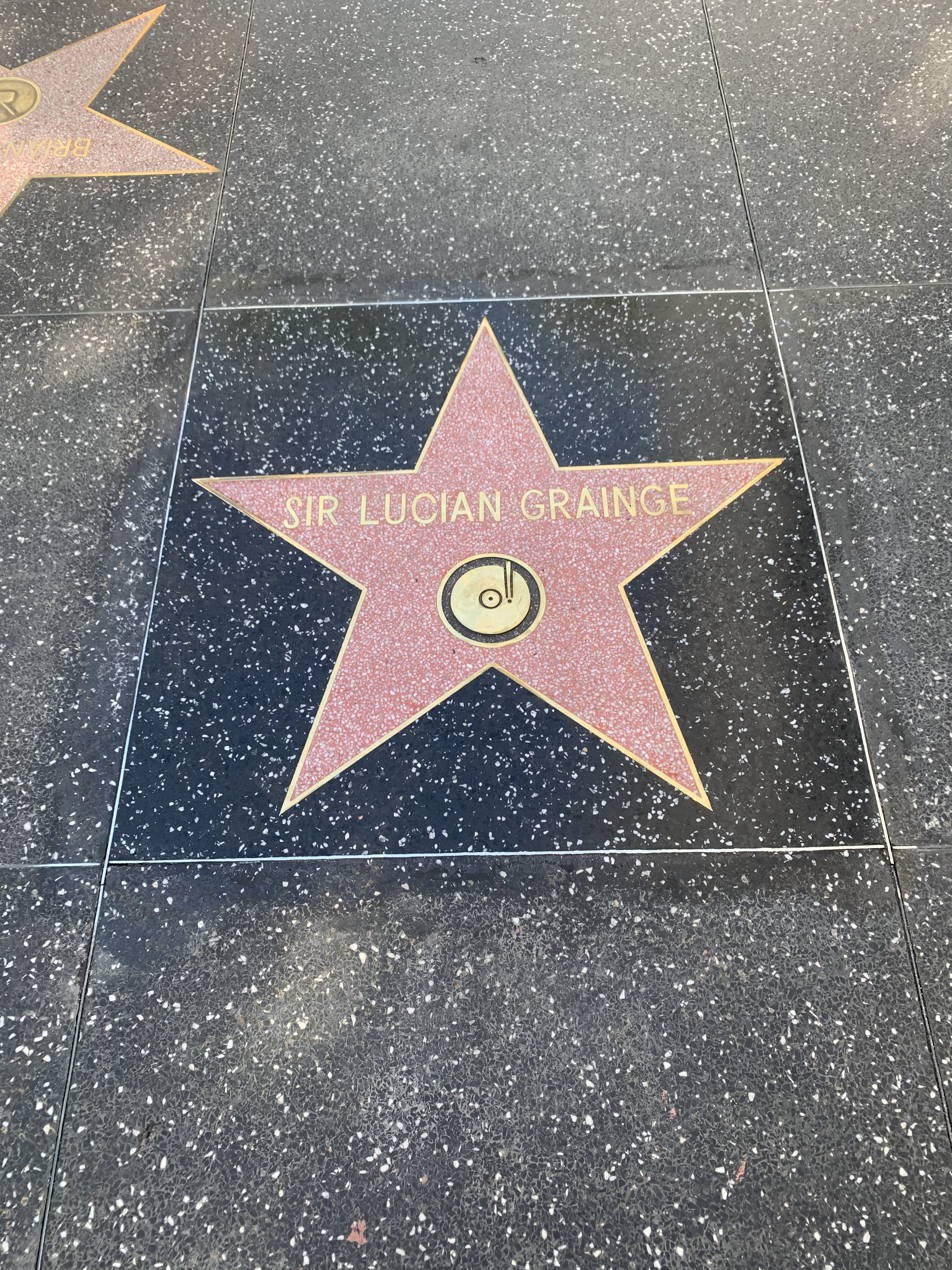

In 2020, Billboard named Grainge as the first-ever Executive of the Decade after he topped the magazine's "Power 100" list as the most powerful person in the music business in 2013, 2015, 2016 and 2019. He is the only person to ever hold that distinction four times and for consecutive years. He was subsequently named No. 1 on the list for 2022, 2023, 2024, and 2026, bringing his total to a record eight times.

Irving Azoff called him "the great hope for the music business" and Jimmy Iovine commented that Grainge "is working to restore [a] spirit of risk-taking and innovation" by being "willing and open to entrepreneurship and that kind of thing the record industry has gotten depleted of." An interview feature in Billboard described Grainge as "a fierce and tireless advocate for the recorded-music business". In 2013, CNET wrote that "Grainge is positioning Universal to lead the pack" of major labels in their embracing of new digital opportunities. A 2014 front-page Los Angeles Times profile said that "if anyone can save the music business, it might be Grainge."

In January 2020, Grainge was awarded a star on the Hollywood Walk of Fame with UMG artists including Beck, Justin Bieber, Birdman, Lewis Capaldi, Tori Kelly, Sam Smith, and Hailee Steinfeld in attendance. Shawn Mendes and Lionel Richie were the ceremony's featured presenters. Ellen K of KOST Radio Morning Show host, the emcee of the event, said, "I've never seen so many stars show up to a Walk of Fame ceremony before."

In 2025, Variety ranked him eighth on its list of the most powerful executives in the entertainment industry.

In March 2026, Brentford F.C. announced an investment by Sir Lucian Grainge and his appointment to the board of the club's holding company, Best Intentions Analytics Limited.

Preceded by Doug Morris	Chairman & Chief Executive Officer of Universal Music Group; 1 January 2011 to Present	Succeeded by incumbent
