= Candidly Nicole =

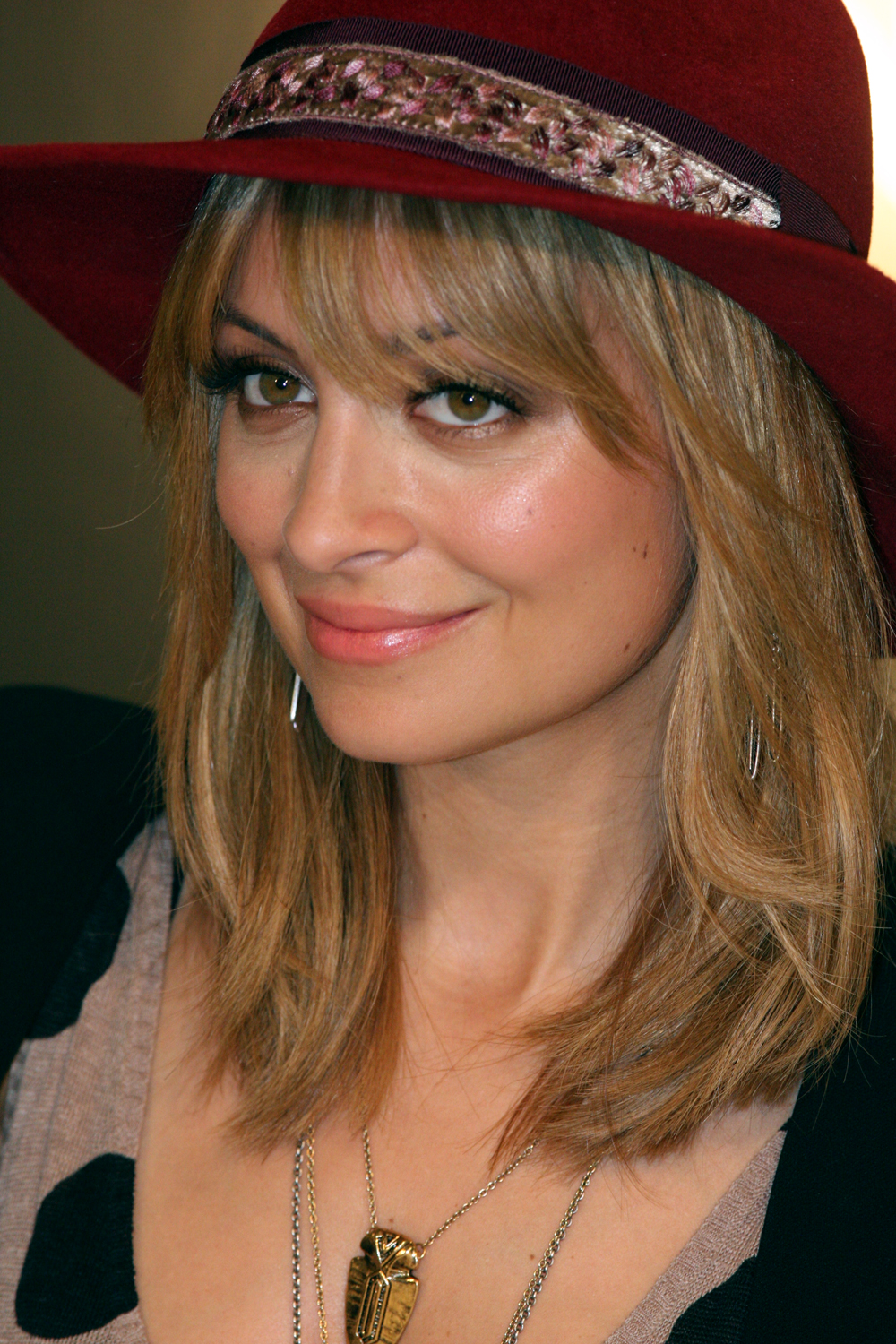
- Nicole Richie
- Genre: Reality
- Starring: Nicole Richie
- Country of origin: United States
- Original language: English
- No. of seasons: 2
- No. of episodes: 16

Production
- Executive producers: Fenton Bailey; Randy Barbato; Michael Baum; Nicole Richie; Tom Campbell
- Running time: 22 minutes
- Production companies: World of Wonder; Telepictures; Warner Bros. Television

Original release
- Network: VH1
- Release: July 17, 2014 – September 16, 2015

Candidly Nicole is an American scripted comedic faux-reality television series starring Nicole Richie. The series premiered on July 17, 2014, on VH1. Richie talks about her humorous daily adventures and her views on everything from style to relationships.

The series received its UK premiere on Sunday 28 February 2016 on ITVBe.

== Cast ==
=== Main ===
- Nicole Richie

=== Guest stars ===
- Kelly Oxford
- Sofia Richie
- Jensen Karp
- Lionel Richie
- Benji Madden
- Erin Foster
- Ryan Seacrest
- Rashida Jones

== Episodes ==
=== Series overview ===
Season	Episodes	Originally released	
Season	Episodes	First released	Last released
1	8	July 17, 2014	September 4, 2014
2	8	July 29, 2015	September 16, 2015

=== Season 1 (2014) ===
No. overall	No. in season	Title	Original release date	US viewers (millions)
1	1	"How to Online Date"	July 17, 2014	N/A
2	2	"How to Be an Adult"	July 24, 2014	N/A
3	3	"How to Be Friends with Hens"	July 31, 2014	N/A
4	4	"How to Be Short"	August 7, 2014	N/A
5	5	"How to Be a Boss"	August 14, 2014	N/A
6	6	"How to Go Offline"	August 21, 2014	N/A
7	7	"How to Say Yes"	August 28, 2014	N/A
8	8	"How to Love Your Girlfriends"	September 4, 2014	N/A

=== Season 2 (2015) ===
No. overall	No. in season	Title	Original release date	US viewers (millions)
9	1	"Nicole Richie: Inventor"	July 29, 2015	N/A
10	2	"Nicole Richie: Artist"	August 5, 2015	N/A
11	3	"Nicole Richie: Doppelganger"	August 12, 2015	N/A
12	4	"Nicole Richie: By Nicole Richie"	August 19, 2015	N/A
13	5	"Nicole Richie: Ex-Girlfriend"	August 26, 2015	N/A
14	6	"Nicole Richie: Gay"	September 2, 2015	N/A
15	7	"Nicole Richie: Australian"	September 9, 2015	N/A
16	8	"Nicole Richie: Behind the Music"	September 16, 2015	N/A
