= Tanner Cohen =

American actor and singer

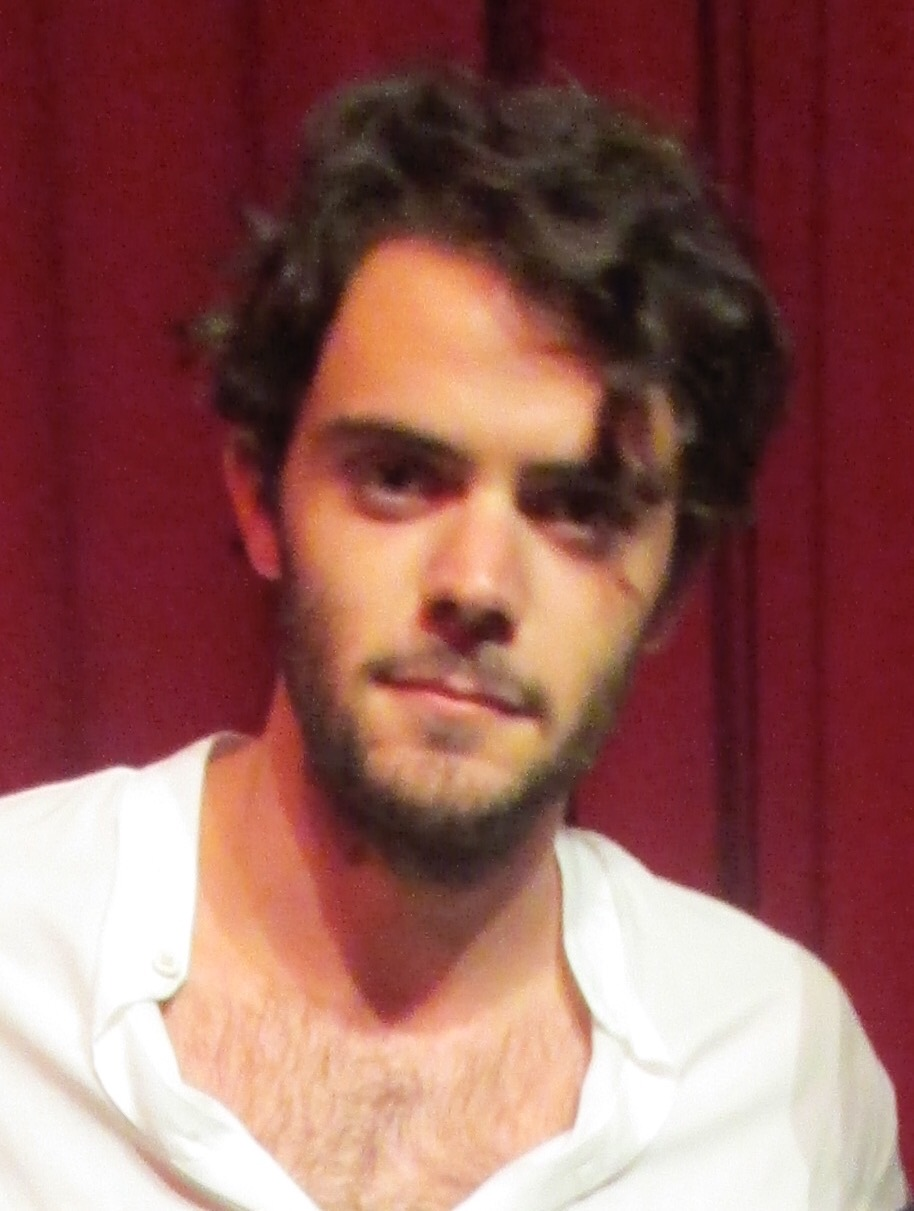
- Cohen in 2012
- Occupations: Actor, singer
- Years active: 2006–present
- Relatives: David Oliver Cohen (brother)

Tanner Cohen is an American stage, film and television actor, and singer.

== Career ==
In 2006, Cohen appeared as Tad Becker in five episodes of the American soap opera As the World Turns. He appeared in the 2007 thriller The Life Before Her Eyes. In 2008, he made his leading film debut as Timothy in Were the World Mine, an independent musical film based on A Midsummer Night's Dream. He also contributed to the soundtrack. He had taken voice lessons for a year.

In 2010, Cohen appeared opposite Andy Ridings in Over and Over, a play produced as part of the New York International Fringe Festival (FringeNYC). The play ran from August 18 to August 28 at the Studio @ Cherry Lane, then again from September 9 through 25 as part of The FringeNYC Encore Series.

In 2013, Cohen appeared in Getting Go: The Go Doc Project in the role of a shy college grad (Doc) who devises to shoot a documentary about the New York City nightlife scene to meet the go-go dancer he is obsessed with.

== Filmography ==
Film and television performances by Tanner Cohen
Year	Title	Role	Notes
2006	As the World Turns	Tad Becker	TV series; 5 episodes
2007	The Life Before Her Eyes	Nate Witt	Film
2008	Were the World Mine	Timothy	Musical film
2013	Getting Go: The Go Doc Project	Doc	Film
2014	Royal Pains	Courier	TV series; episode: "Everybody Loves Ray, Man"
2014–2015	Looking	Scotty	TV series; 2 episodes: "Looking for Now" and "Looking for Results"
2020	Ramy	Man at Bar	TV series; episode: "Uncle Naseem"

== Personal life ==
Cohen is Jewish. He graduated from UCLA in 2009, and is openly gay. His brother, David Oliver Cohen, is a television actor.

In 2010, he recorded and posted a video in connection with the It Gets Better Project and The Trevor Project.
