= CeCe Peniston discography =

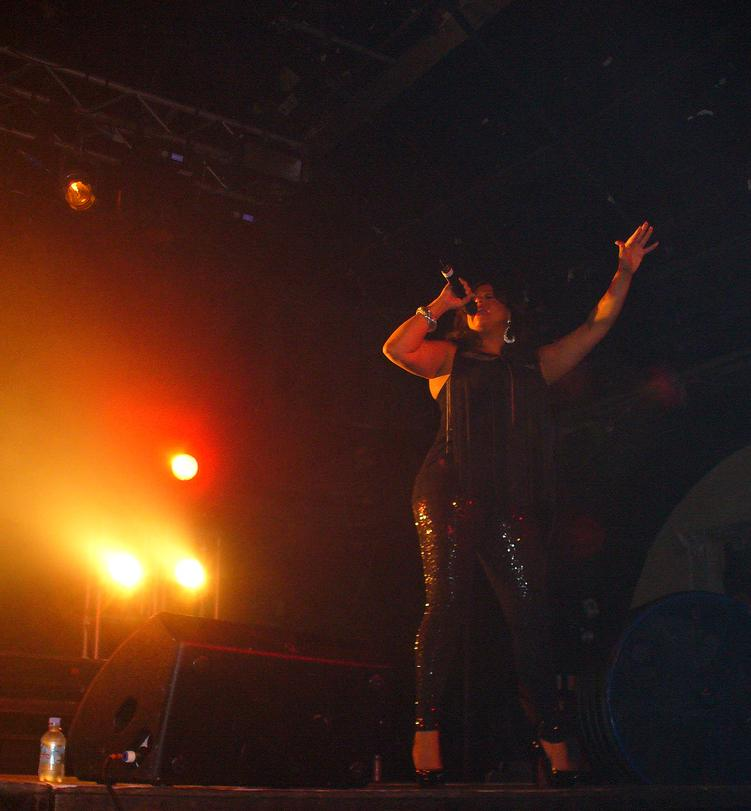
- Peniston performing in the nightclub Heaven in Central London, England on July 26, 2009.

Releases:
Studio albums	4
Remix albums	2
Live albums	1
Compilation albums	4
EPs	1
Singles	29
Download singles	21
Promotional songs	7
Other appearances	26
Video albums	1
Music videos	14

American recording artist CeCe Peniston entered the music industry as a backup vocalist on the Overweight Pooch's album Female Preacher, released in July 1991 on A&M Records. Shortly before that, she was featured on the B-side to 12-inch single "I Can't Take the Power" by male rapper Marvelous JC. Besides her vocal performance on the Pooch's only charting track, "I Like It", she was given a credit for co-writing two compositions; "Kickin' Da Blues" and the titular "Female Preacher". Soon after, the singer pursued a solo career. By now, Peniston has released four studio albums including one as a member of The Sisters of Glory, two remix collections, one live album, four compilations and one live extended play (EP). Her singles discography features twenty-nine physical releases, twenty-one digital-only, seven promotional recordings and twenty-six other appearances; regardless of their format. She has also been included on one video album and has made fourteen music videos.

Peniston recorded her own single "Finally" through A&M. The song was released in August 1991 and was followed by her full-length debut on January 28, 1992. Both the album and single of the same name, were certified Gold by the Recording Industry Association of America (RIAA) and the set itself by the Canadian Recording Industry Association (CRIA). They also earned two certifications from the British Phonographic Industry (BPI), respectively. By the time the album's local sales reached half a million copies, "We Got a Love Thang" and "Keep On Walkin'", would give her three consecutive number-one hits on the US Hot Dance Club Play, as well on the Canadian RPM Dance/Urban chart. Furthermore, each track reached the top-ten of Music Week's singles chart in the United Kingdom, and the top-twenty of Billboard's Hot 100 in the United States. The album itself broke into the top-forty music charts in Austria, Canada, the Netherlands and the UK, peaking home at number 70. Additional compositions from her first album, "Inside That I Cried" and "Crazy Love", scored successes in the R&B charts.

Her second studio set, Thought 'Ya Knew, saw its results on January 25, 1994. Having entered the top-forty only in the UK and Switzerland, the album somewhat failed to match the sales of its predecessor, reaching its peak in the Billboard 200 at position 96. It did, however, make an impact on the dance field, yielding two chart-toppers in the US. "I'm in the Mood", with its incorporated jazz elements, served as the album's pilot single. The latter singles, such as "Keep Givin' Me Your Love" released in the US a year after its European release, and "I'm Not Over You", those achieved top-5 statuses at least. While "Hit by Love", another house anthem, became the singer's fifth club number 1. As a result, she was named Billboard's number one Dance/Club Play artist of 1994.

I'm Movin' On, the third album by Peniston, was released on September 9, 1996, and was viewed as a commercial failure. As such it thus did not achieve a presence on any overall albums charts. Mid-tempo single, "Movin' On" featuring rap by Suga T, reached number 83 and her so-called "vocal duel" with JoJo Hailey, "Before I Lay (You Drive Me Crazy)", missed the US Hot 100 altogether. In February 1998 Peniston experienced a late comeback in the overseas, when her remake of Jocelyn Brown's classic "Somebody Else's Guy" climbed to number 13 on the British singles chart; her highest top-100 entry in the country since May 1992. The remixes of the song were released on March 2, 1998 on her import greatest hits compilation The Best Of, her closing album on A&M. While the original version appeared on later collection of her hits, Essential, issued also overseas through Spectrum in 2000.

Subsequently, singer managed to record a number of singles, some of which garnered attention within their genre through various independent labels. Amongst them were three solo tracks such as "He Loves Me 2" (1999), "Lifetime to Love" (2001) and "Eternal Lover" (2004), as well her collaborations with other artists. These included "Reminiscin" with Saison (2001), "Deeper Love" with David Longoria (2005) and "Shame Shame Shame" with Soulshaker (2007).

Since the 2010s, Peniston has released new material mostly in a digital format. While "Nothing Can Stop Me" (2014) received significant airplay on urban AC stations, "Believe" (2015), recorded with Chaos, happened to become her first entry on the US Dance chart in 10 years. Her 2017 single, "Purple Funk", almost topped the US Hot Singles Sales component chart.

== Albums ==
=== Studio albums ===
List of albums with selected chart positions, certifications and sales figures
Title	Details	Chart positions										Sales figures	Certifications
Title	Details	US	US Gos.	US R&B	AUS	AUT	CAN	GER	NLD	SWI	UK	Sales figures	Certifications
Finally (Note: According to an article published by The Chicago Defender in June 2009, her debut album Finally allegedly "sold over 3 million copies". Its source is unknown, neither is whether this figure refers to worldwide or US sales.)	Release date: January 28, 1992; Label: A&M (#75021 5381); Format: LP • MC • CD • MD	70	—	13	95	38	20	—	31	—	10	US: 554,000 (as of 2004)	RIAA: Gold; BPI: Silver; CRIA: Gold
Thought 'Ya Knew (Note: Thought 'Ya Knew also charted in Japan at number 66.)	Release date: January 10, 1994; Label: A&M (#31454 0138); Format: LP • MC • CD • DDC • MD	96	—	20	—	—	—	92	69	32	31		
Good News in Hard Times (as The Sisters of Glory)	Release date: August 22, 1995; Label: Warner Bros/WEA (#9 45990); Format: CD	—	29	—	—	—	—	—	—	—	—		
I'm Movin' On	Release date: September 9, 1996; Label: A&M (#31454 0562); Format: MC • CD • MD	—	—	48	—	—	—	—	—	—	—		
"—" denotes a title that did not chart or was not released in the region

=== Remix albums ===
Title	Details	Notes
Finally/We Got a Love Thang: Remix Collection	Release date: July 1, 1992; Label: A&M (#PCCY-10314); Format: CD	Remix mini-album issued as part of the limited AM+ series in Japan, featuring in total eight alternate versions of Peniston's first two solo singles ("Finally" and "We Got a Love Thang").
Remix Collection	Release date: November 2, 1994; Label: A&M (#POCM-1087); Format: CD	Remix album issued in Japan, tracking the singer's discography since "Keep On Walkin'" to "Hit by Love" singles. Overall nine 12" versions included, mostly available only on vinyl by then.

=== Live albums ===
Title	Details	Notes
Divas of Disco – Live (CeCe Peniston, Thelma Houston, Linda Clifford, A Taste of Honey and France Joli)	Release date: February 26, 2010; Label: Pegasus Entertainment (#PEG CD 702); Format: CD	An import album issued in Germany, featuring a five-star live concert from Avalon Hollywood, originally released only on DVD.

=== Compilation albums ===
Title	Details	Notes
The Best Of	Release date: March 2, 1998; Label: A&M (#540 880); Format: MC • CD	Import album and her first greatest hits collection issued in Europe. The set compils eleven singles in total, featuring two additional mixes of "Finally" and "Somebody Else's Guy".
Essential	Release date: February 28, 2000; Label: A&M/Spectrum (#544 189); Format: CD	Import album and her second best-of compilation commercially issued first in England through Spectrum, a division of Universal Music Operations. An edited version of "Finally" included instead. (In 2006, released in Japan).
Winning Combinations (with Vesta Williams)	Release date: October 10, 2000; Label: A&M/Universal (#490762); Format: CD • MD	US ten-track split collection issued as part of the Universal Special Products "WC" series, coupling singer with Williams. It features "Finally", "I'm in the Mood", "Before I Lay", "Hit by Love" and "We Got a Love Thang". (In 2002, released also in Canada.)
The Millennium Collection: The Best of CeCe Peniston	Release date: April 10, 2001; Label: A&M/Universal (#490 876); Format: CD • MD	Her only compilation issued in the US as part of the 20th Century Masters series with a Universal Music & Video Distribution. It features eleven remastered recordings of her songs, excluding one remix of "Finally".

== EPs ==
Title	Details	Notes
CeCe Peniston (also known as EP Live)	Release date: July 14, 2008; Label: One Media (#–); Format: MD • CD-R (2011, POD-only)	Three-track digital release manufactured on demand via a division of Amazon.com, also available on DVD/CD compilation Divas of Disco. (Since 2013, a number of edited reissues followed on and/or under various labels and title equivalents.)

== Singles ==
=== As lead artist ===
List of singles with selected chart positions, certifications and principal albums
Title	Year	Chart positions										Certifications	Album
Title	Year	US	US Dance	US R&B	AUS	AUT	CAN	GER	NLD	SWI	UK	Certifications	Album
"Finally" (Note: "Finally" was released on CDS on three separate occasions in the UK – initial release from October 1991 reached position 29, its re-issue in March 1992 resulted in number 2 and a remix from September 1997 in number 26. Upon its international release, the single entered the music charts in Flanders (#3), France (#39), Ireland (#5) and New Zealand (#8). An additional remix from September 2008 topped the Australian Club Tracks, charting at number 33 on the now discontinued Global Dance Tracks, while in May 2017 the original version reached number 2 on the Spotify Rewind.)	1991	5	1	26	8	9	12	16	5	12	2	RIAA: Gold; BPI: Platinum	Finally
"We Got a Love Thang" (Note: "We Got a Love Thang" appeared also in the singles charts in Flanders (#5), Ireland (#15), New Zealand (#33) and Sweden (#34).)	1992	20	1	38	36	—	26	41	9	—	6		Finally
"Keep On Walkin'" (Note: "Keep on Walkin'" made chart entries also in Flanders (#31) and Ireland (#17), while missed the Top 100 in Australia (#123). In August 2011, Peniston released a cover version of the song as her virtual duet with Lavon Collins.)	1992	15	1	3	—	—	67	—	41	—	10		Finally
"Crazy Love" (Note: Singles "Crazy Love" and "Inside That I Cried" were released in the US in reverse order.)	1992	97	—	31	—	—	—	—	—	—	44		Finally
"Inside That I Cried"	1992	94	—	10	—	—	—	—	—	—	42		Finally
"I'm in the Mood" (Note: "I'm in the Mood" failed to enter the Australian Top 100, climbing to number 197.)	1993	32	1	7	—	—	88	68	22	29	16		Thought 'Ya Knew
"Keep Givin' Me Your Love" (Note: "Keep Givin' Me Your Love" was promoted in England as the second single from Thought 'Ya Knew, while in the US as the fourth, being distributed in 1995 through Columbia in support of the Ready to Wear (Prêt-à-Porter) soundtrack. The title also charted in New Zealand (#26), but missed the Hot 100 after bubbling under at number 101. In Canada for change, it entered the local dance chart (#13).)	1994	—	4	—	99	—	—	—	—	—	36		Thought 'Ya Knew
"I'm Not Over You" (Note: "I'm Not Over You" was released in EU mostly as a double A-side single along with "Hit by Love". Whereas in the Netherlands, it appeared as the B-side to the latter single.)	1994	41	2	10	—	—	—	—	—	—	—		Thought 'Ya Knew
"Hit by Love" (Note: "Hit by Love" was issued in the UK as the third and final single from Thought 'Ya Knew, preceded by "I'm in the Mood" and "Keep Givin' Me Your Love". The B-side to the single included a remix of "Through Those Doors" in the region.)	1994	90	1	47	—	—	—	—	—	—	33		Thought 'Ya Knew
"Movin' On" (Note: "Movin' On" was released only in North America and Japan, charting on Canadian RPM Dance at number 16.) (featuring Suga T.)	1996	83	—	29	—	—	—	—	—	—	—		I'm Movin' On
"Before I Lay" (Note: "Before I Lay" was marketed only in the US, managing to peak at number 120.) (featuring JoJo Hailey)	1996	—	—	52	—	—	—	—	—	—	—		I'm Movin' On
"Somebody Else's Guy" (Note: "Somebody Else's Guy" was issued only in the overseas, or rather in EU and Japan. In England, the song also charted in the local Chart-Track, placing at number 6 in February 1998.)	1997	—	—	—	—	—	—	—	—	—	13		The Best Of
"I Know You Want Me" (Note: "I Know You Want Me" was distributed only in the States. In April 1998 it reached number 9 on the Bubbling Under R&B/Hip-Hop chart.) (with Nastyboy Klick)	1998	—	—	—	—	—	—	—	—	—	—		Non-solo album single(s)
"Nobody Else" (Note: "Nobody Else" was released only in some countries, excluding also Japan and the UK.)	1998	—	—	—	—	—	—	—	—	—	—		Non-solo album single(s)
"He Loves Me 2" (Note: "He Loves Me 2" was released only in some countries, excluding also Japan and the UK. In October 2016, the song was re-issued worldwide as a digital maxi single, featuring also new remixes.)	1999	—	24	—	—	—	—	—	—	—	—		Non-solo album single(s)
"Lifetime to Love" (Note: "Lifetime to Love" was distributed within North America.)	2000	—	2	—	—	—	—	—	—	—	—		Non-solo album single(s)
"My Boo" (Note: "My Boo" was released as a single only on vinyl and in the US.)	2001	—	—	—	—	—	—	—	—	—	—		Non-solo album single(s)
"Eternal Lover" (Note: "Eternal Lover" was initially issued only in Australia (#15 on the local club chart), France and New Zealand. In 2013, a music download followed worldwide.) (featuring BiBi)	2004	—	—	—	—	—	—	—	—	—	—		Non-solo album single(s)
"I'm Feelin' U" (Note: "I'm Feelin' U" was commercially issued only on vinyl and in the US. Virtually, also in the overseas.)	2007	—	—	—	—	—	—	—	—	—	—		Non-solo album single(s)
"Shame Shame Shame" (Note: "Same Shame Shame" was released on CD format for promotional purposes only. In October 2007, it charted on the Global Dance Tracks at number 22.) (with Soulshaker)	2007	—	—	—	—	—	—	—	—	—	—		Non-solo album single(s)
"Above Horizons" (Note: "Above Horizons" was distributed only in the States.) (PTA anthem)	2009	—	—	—	—	—	—	—	—	—	—		Non-solo album single(s)
"Nothing Can Stop Me" (Note: "Nothing Can Stop Me" failed to enter the official singles charts, becoming in US an Adult R&B Airplay hit at number 29.)	2014	—	—	—	—	—	—	—	—	—	—		Non-solo album single(s)
"—" denotes a title that did not chart or was not released in the region. Singles listed in order of their first appearance, regardless of the country of origin.

=== As featured artist ===
List of singles with selected chart positions, certifications and principal albums
Title	Year	Chart positions		Album
Title	Year	US Dance	UK	Album
"I Like It" (Overweight Pooch featuring CeCe Peniston)	1991	16	58	Female Preacher
"Reminiscin" (Note: "Reminiscin" and "Deeper Love" were made for the US.) (Saison featuring CeCe Peniston)	2001	30	—	Non-solo album single(s)
"For My Baby" (Note: "For My Baby" was promoted only in England.) (Full Flava featuring CeCe Peniston)	2003	—	—	Non-solo album single(s)
"Deeper Love" (David Longoria featuring CeCe Peniston)	2005	14	—	Non-solo album single(s)
"You Are the Universe" (Note: "You Are the Universe" was released on vinyl, in Japan and the UK. Elsewhere, in a digital format.) (Full Flava featuring CeCe Peniston)	2006	—	—	Non-solo album single(s)
"Believe" (Note: "Believe" was released on CD-R only for promotional purposes. It reached also number 2 in the UK Cool Cuts Chart.) (Chaos featuring CeCe Peniston)	2015	5	—	Non-solo album single(s)
"Purple Funk" (Note: "Purple Funk" debuted at number 2 on the Hot Singles Sales on July 29, 2017.) (Mothers Favorite Child featuring CeCe Peniston)	2017	—	—	Non-solo album single(s)

=== Download-only ===
Title	Year	Notes
"Still I"	2007	Released only as a 256 kbit/s download with a limited digital distribution.
"In Love with a DJ" (with Ron Carroll)	2010	Released as a digital maxi single. In 2014 re-issued under title "Turn It Up".
"Stoopid!"	2011	Released in two single versions including one remixed.
"Celebrate"	2012	Released in two versions, single and extended.
"You've Never Seen" (EC Twins featuring CeCe Peniston)	2012	Released in a single version only.
"All My Love" (Richard Beynon and Zen Freeman featuring CeCe Peniston)	2013	Released as a digital maxi single.
"Get to Steppin" (Fast Eddie featuring CeCe Peniston)	2013	Released as a digital maxi single.
"Let's Go All Night" (James Doman and Antoine Becks featuring CeCe Peniston)	2013	Released as a digital maxi single.
"Without You" (Junior Sanchez featuring CeCe Peniston)	2014	Released in a single version only.
"Love Don't Take Over" (MG Select featuring CeCe Peniston)	2014	Released as a digital maxi single.
"Sick" (CeCe Peniston featuring Paris Toon and Mothers Favorite Child)	2014	Released only in the US and a single version.
"The DJ Made Me Stay" (Paul Oakenfold and Joyriders featuring CeCe Peniston)	2015	Released as a digital maxi single.
"Piece of That" (DJ Sun Junkie featuring CeCe Peniston and Dayion)	2016	Released as a digital single (originally intended for her 2009 unreleased album CeCe).
"Reflections of a Disco Ball" (CeCe Peniston featuring Mothers Favorite Child)	2017	Released as a digital maxi single. (It features also an interlude bonus titled "R.O.A.D. B" with Tenth Month.)
"Hot"	2018	Released in the US as a digital maxi single (B-side "You Can Tell Your Friends" incorporating "Finally")
"Make Me Say (Afro Chi Vibe)" (with Ron Carroll)	2018	Released as a digital single. (In 2011 as "Make Me Say Oh (4da Radio Head Mix)", it appeared on download compilation Miami 2011, issued by Juno.
"Are You Ready?" (with Four80East)	2018	Released as a digital maxi single worldwide.
"Oh Happy Day" (live) (with Thelma Houston and Phoebe Snow)	2019	Released as a digital single.
"Silly" (with DeCarlos "Cos" Waller)	2019	Released as a digital single.
"Whatchu On?" (2:AM Ricky featuring CeCe Peniston)	2020	Released as a digital single.
"Anyway"	2021	Released as a digital single.

=== Promotional songs ===
Title	Year	Notes
"Hitmix"	1992	UK medley with snippets of her songs from the debut album, commercially issued in two versions on the local MCD release of "Inside That I Cried".
"Searchin'"	1993	UK 12" single. In EU a Hurley's remix of the song was issued on B-side of the "I'm in the Mood" release, while "I'm Not Over You" in the US.
"House Party"	1996	US 12" single, issued in common with "Before I Lay (You Drive Me Crazy)" as a double A-side release.
"I Can't Go for That (No Can Do)"	1998	Originally designed for Nobody Else, her cancelled album release on Silk.
"Runway"	2009	Originally intended for CeCe, another unreleased album. The tracks were released to her community via social networking service MySpace, as well covered through the radio stations.
"Love Hurts (He Say, She Say)" (with Montell Jordan)	2009	Originally intended for CeCe, another unreleased album. The tracks were released to her community via social networking service MySpace, as well covered through the radio stations.
"Dance with Me"	2012	Digital track promoted by 16 Bars through the SoundCloud audio distribution in July 2012. Produced by Zai, supported also with a music video.

=== Other appearances ===
Title	Year)	Notes
"Give It All U Gott" (Marvelous JC featuring CeCe Peniston)	1991	Appears in two versions on B-side of 12" vinyl "I Can't Take the Power" by Marvelous JC, released through Powermix.
"Kickin' Da Blues" (Overweight Pooch featuring CeCe Peniston)	1991	Additional tracks co-written/recorded for the album Female Preacher, issued through A&M. ("I Like It" was available on single.)
"Female Preacher" (Overweight Pooch featuring CeCe Peniston)	1991	Additional tracks co-written/recorded for the album Female Preacher, issued through A&M. ("I Like It" was available on single.)
"Don't Forget the Love" (Jeff Lorber featuring CeCe Peniston)	1994	Appears on Lorber's album West Side Stories, issued via Verve Forecast.
"Stille Nacht" (Various artists featuring the Sisters of Glory)	1995	Appears on double compilation Concerto di Natale, issued via Columbia in Germany. (Recorded on December 16, 1994 at Aula Paolo VI, Vatican.)
"All That I Need"	1996	Appears as the opening track on OST The Associate, issued via Motown.
"The Christmas Song"	1996	Appears as the opening track on holiday compilation Merry Arizona Two: Desert Stars Shine at Christmas, issued through UCP.
"What a Wonderful World"	1997	Appears on the follow-up holiday album Merry Arizona 97: Desert Stars Shine at Christmas, also via UCP.
"When I'm with You"	1998	Additional track recorded for the compilation Desert Funk Soundtrack by M.C. Magic. (Duet "I Know You Want Me" with NBK was available on single.)
"Keep It Real" (M-Doc featuring CeCe Peniston)	1998	Recorded for M-Doc's album Young, Black, Rich and Famous, issued through Alexia/InDaSoul with a distribution by Ichiban.
"Roll the Windows Down" (Sinamin featuring CeCe Peniston and Azzan)	2000	Appears on studio album ...So Hot by Sinamin, issued in US on Grand OZ.
"Silent Night"	2001	Appears on 9-track compilation A Christmas Card from Arizona to New York, presented by Phase Four Studios for the World Aid Benefit for 9/11 in 2001.
"I Think About Him" (Full Flava featuring CeCe Peniston)	2003	Another track co-written/recorded for the Flava's compilation Colour of My Soul, issued through Dôme. ("For My Baby" was available on single).
"Runnin' Away" (co-writer only)	2003	Recorded on 12-inch vinyl by Sharon Pass and Steve Hurley, also known as Voices of Life, for Silk Entertainment. (The song co-written with Eric Miller, was virtually re-issued in December 2015, featuring new remixes.)
"I Like (Edited)" (with Adeva)	2004	Released on French double mixed compilation Tribute to the Disco Funk, issued through SMM/Yanis. (A 2004 version of "Finally" also included.)
"It's Alright" (co-writer only)	2006	Recorded on 12-inch vinyl by Redsoul and RaShaan Houston for Generate Music. (Co-written with George Jackson and Houston.)
"Right Here"	2007	A digital track produced by Delgado and Jackson for Sandworx. Written by Shantal Reed, the "lost tape" was published via SoundCloud in 2012.
"See Me Now" (Daiyon featuring CeCe Peniston)	2013	Appears on rapper's album The Life, issued through his virtual label DMG.
"Make You Fall" (Markus Schulz featuring CeCe Peniston)	2014	Appears on the DJ's album Scream 2, issued in the Netherlands through Armada, while via ООО "ПАРА МЬЮЗИК"/Open Gate in Russia.
"A Night that We Will Never Forget" (Full Force featuring CeCe Peniston and Freedom Williams)	2014	Appears on the R&B group's all-star album With Love from Our Friends, issued through Full Force Productions.
"For the Love of You" (Aston Grey Project featuring CeCe Peniston and Tim Gordon)	2015	Appears on the album Changing the Game, issued on Platinum Vybe Recordings. An alternate version of the track, "CeCe Live Mix", was released on the band's 2016 compilation The Hits.
"HBS (Honey Brown Sugah)" (Kevin McCall featuring CeCe Peniston)	2016	A digital track
"Wish" (Mothers Favorite Child featuring CeCe Peniston)	2017	Appears in two versions on B-side of the single "Purple Funk".
"(Don't Wanna Be) The Fool on the Hill" (Bob Baldwin featuring CeCe Peniston)	2018	Appears on the tribute album Bob Baldwin Presents Abbey Road and the Beatles, made under Red River Entertainment.
"Just Gettin' Started" (Jackie's Boy featuring CeCe Peniston and NMBRND)	2020	Appears on the Jackie's Boy digital four-track EP The Black Chapter, issued through Big Circle Music Group.
"Love / Hate" (R. Bernard featuring CeCe Peniston)	2021	Appears on the Bernard's self-released virtual EP The Journey.

== Videos ==
=== Video albums ===
Title	Year	Notes
Divas of Disco (Linda Clifford, A Taste of Honey, Thelma Houston, France Joli & CeCe Peniston)	Release date: January 8, 2008 (EU)/ 2009 (US); Label: ZYX (EU, #DVD3136)/RSM (US, #DVD057); Format: DVD	Home video of a 2007 five-star concert from Avalon, also known as Live in Hollywood, later issued on CD as well. The European edition included also a bonus material, such as biographies and backstage interviews. (In 2014 reissued in the UK as part of the LIVE Concert Series via Wienerworld.)

=== Music videos ===
Title	Year	Director
"Finally"	1991	Claude Borenzweig
"We Got a Love Thang"	1992	
"Keep On Walkin'"	1992	Millicent Shelton
"Inside That I Cried"	1992	
"Crazy Love"	1992	
"I'm in the Mood" (Original Mix & Bad Yard Club)	1994	Antoine Fuqua
"Keep Givin' Me Your Love"	1994	
"I'm Not Over You"	1994	Millicent Shelton
"Hit by Love" (US and UK version)	1994	Millicent Shelton
"Movin' On" (single and remix versions)	1996	Paul Hunter
"Finally 2011"	2011	Trevor Adler
"Dance with Me"	2012	Colin Pierce
"My Superman" (Ski Johnson) (acting credits-only)	2013	Scott Hebert
"Piece of That" (DJ Sun Junkie featuring CeCe Peniston and Dayion)	2016	Shaun Asakura

== See also ==
- List of awards and nominations received by CeCe Peniston
- List of Billboard number-one dance singles (1991, 1992, 1994)
- List of RPM number-one dance singles (1991, 1992)
- Lists of UK top 10 singles (1992)
