= List of awards and nominations received by CeCe Peniston =

CeCe Peniston awards
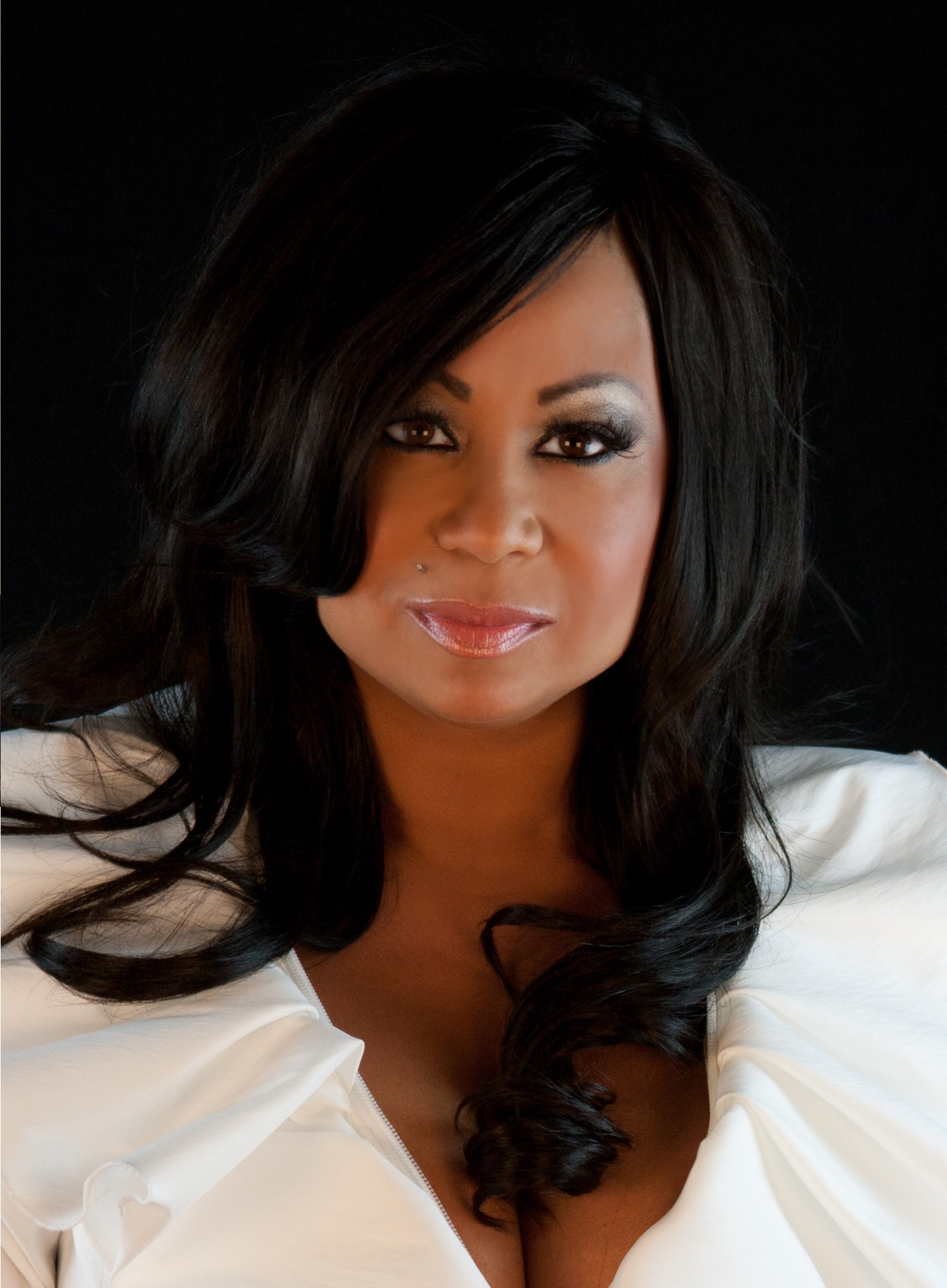
- Peniston in 2012
Totals
Award	Wins	Nominations
ASCAP Awards	3	3
Billboard Music Video Awards	1	3
BMI Awards	1	1
VH1 Awards	0	1
STM Awards	0	1
WMC Awards	3	3
BPI certifications	2	2
CRIA certifications	1	1
RIAA certifications	2	2
Year-end charts	1	73
Beauty pageants	2	2
Other honors	2	2
Awards won	18
Nominations	94

The following is a list of music awards and/or nominations earned by the U.S. singer-songwriter CeCe Peniston, along with her music recording sales certifications and entries in the year-end charts.

Over her over twenty years long career, Peniston released only three solo studio albums: Finally (1992), Thought 'Ya Knew (1994) and I'm Movin' On (1996) - each on A&M Records. She was still active, though, in recording singles also the last decade. Her fourth set CeCe, originally slated for its release in August 2011 on the independent label West Swagg Music Group, was not released by now.

Apart from being a Soul Train Music Award-nominee in 1993, Peniston won three ASCAP awards, three WMC awards, one Billboard Music Video Award and a BMI Award (all for her debut album). She topped one year-end chart as Top Dance Music Club Play Artist of 1994 and received five sales certifications.

Before entering the music industry, Peniston participated in beauty competitions and was crowned Miss Black Arizona in 1989, and Miss Galaxy in 1990. In addition, she was honored by the Governor's Key to the State of Arizona, and inducted into the Phoenix College Hall of Fame.

== Music awards and nominations ==
=== ASCAP Awards ===
The American Society of Composers, Authors and Publishers (ASCAP) is a not-for-profit performance rights organization that protects its members' musical copyrights by monitoring public performances of their music, whether via a broadcast or live performance, and compensating them accordingly. Peniston won three awards:^{[A]}

Year	Nominated work	Category	Result
1992	"Finally"	Song of the Year	Won
1992	"Finally"	Pop Songwriter of the Year	Won
1992	"Finally"	Most Performed Song of the Year	Won

Notes

- A Steve Hurley received two ASCAP Writer's Awards for the songs recorded with Peniston. One for "Keep On Walkin'", while two years later another for "I'm Not Over You".

=== Billboard Music Video Awards ===
The Billboard Music Awards are sponsored by Billboard magazine. The awards are based on sales data by Nielsen SoundScan and radio information by Nielsen Broadcast Data Systems. Peniston holds one award:

Year	Nominated work	Category	Result
1992	"Finally"^{[B]}	Best New Artist – Dance	Won
1992	"Finally"^{[B]}	Best Female Artist – Dance	Nominated
1992	"Keep On Walkin'"	Best Female Artist – R&B/Rap	Nominated

Notes

- B Claude Borenzweig, the director of "Finally" music video, won the category Best Director - Dance.

=== BMI Awards ===
Broadcast Music, Inc. (BMI) is one of three United States performing rights organizations, along with ASCAP and SESAC. It collects license fees on behalf of songwriters, composers, and music publishers and distributes them as royalties to those members whose works have been performed. Peniston received one award:

Year	Nominated work	Category	Result
1993	"Finally"	Urban Award of Achievement	Won

=== Grammy Awards ===
The Grammy Awards are awarded annually by the National Academy of Recording Arts and Sciences in the United States. Peniston was not nominated. However, two remixes of her own compositions, "Nobody Else" and "He Loves Me 2" (#24 on the US Dance), both co-written and performed by herself, brought the four time Grammy-nominee Steve "Silk" Hurley his first two nominations as Remixer of the Year, Non-Classical (in 1999 and in 2000).

=== Soul Train Music Awards ===
The Soul Train Music Awards is an annual award show aired in national broadcast syndication that honors the best in African American music and entertainment established in 1987. Peniston was nominated once (but lost in favor of the album What's the 411? by Mary J. Blige):

Year	Nominated work	Category	Result
1993	Finally	Best R&B/Soul Album – Female	Nominated

=== VH1 Awards ===
VH1: 100 Greatest Dance Songs of All Time was a five-part series compiled by the music channel in 2000 that tracked mostly the disco era. The show, hosted by Paula Abdul, featured interviews, original commentaries, archival clips and rare concert footage.

Year	Nominated work	Category	Result
2000	"Finally"	Greatest Dance Song^{[C]}	Nominated

Notes

- C The series won Gloria Gaynor's hit "I Will Survive" from 1979. "Finally" finished as the 29th.
  In 2006, the Slant Magazine published its own list of 100 Greatest Dance Songs, Peniston was not included though.

=== WMC Awards ===
The Winter Music Conference (WMC) is a weeklong electronic music conference that is aimed at professionals such as artists, DJs, record label representatives (A&R), producers, promoters, radio and the media. Peniston scored three awards:

Year	Nominated work	Category	Result
1992	"Finally"	Best New Dance Artist	Won
1992	"Finally"	Best Dance Artist – Solo	Won
1992	"Finally"	Best 12" Dance Record	Won

== Music recording sales certifications ==
Music recording sales certification is a system of certifying that a music recording has shipped or sold a certain number of copies. The number of sales or shipments required for a silver, gold, (multi-)platinum or diamond threshold depends on the population of the territory in which the title is released. These certificates are not automatic; the record label must pay a fee to have carried out an audit into the release in question.

=== BPI certifications ===
The British Phonographic Industry (BPI) is the UK record industry's trade association. The level of the award varies and certificates are usually awarded on the basis of the amount of units the release has shipped, rather than the amount it has sold. Peniston received two certifications:

Year	Nominated work	Format	Award	Quota	Result
1992	"Finally"	Single	Silver	200,000	Certified
1992	Finally	Album	Silver	60,000	Certified

=== CRIA certifications ===
The Music Canada, formerly known as Canadian Recording Industry Association (CRIA), represents the interests of Canadian companies that create, manufacture and market sound recordings. Similarly to the BPI, they provide audio or video certifications, using only different thresholds. Peniston received one certified award:

Year	Nominated work	Format	Award	Quota	Result
1992	Finally	Album	Gold	50,000	Certified

=== RIAA certifications ===
The Recording Industry Association of America (RIAA) operates an award program for the releases that sell a large(r) number of copies. Peniston received two certifications:

Year	Nominated work	Format	Award	Quota	Result
1992	"Finally"	Single	Gold	500,000	Certified
1992	Finally	Album	Gold	500,000	Certified

== Year-end charts ==
Year-end charts are usually calculated by an inverse-point system based solely on a title's performance during any given chart year.

=== Australia ===
ARIA

ARIA singles/albums chart is issued weekly by the Australian Recording Industry Association, and the charts are a record of the highest selling singles and albums in various genres in the country. Top 100 End of Year chart profiles the whole year in music.

Year	Nominated work	Category	Result
1992	"Finally"	Top Pop Singles	#99
2008	"Finally 2008"	Top Club Tracks	#17

Kent Music Report

Kent Music Report was a weekly record chart of Australian music singles and albums, compiled by David Kent from 1974 to 1998. Afterwards, RIAA, who had been using the report under license for a number of years, chose to produce their own charts as the 'ARIA Charts'.

Year	Nominated work	Category	Result
1992	"Finally"	Top Singles	#57

=== Canada ===
MuchMusic Countdown

MuchMusic Countdown, originally sponsored by Coca-Cola (as the Coca-Cola Countdown) is a ninety-minute music video program block aired on Canadian music television station MuchMusic.

Year	Nominated work	Category	Result
1991	"Finally"	Top Singles	#66

RPM

The Canadian singles/albums chart was originally published by magazine RPM. Since November 2000, the Jam! Canoe website publishes a comprehensive collection of the official Canadian record charts (as compiled by Nielsen SoundScan). Peniston entered a RPM Year-End Dance/Urban chart:

Year	Nominated work	Category	Result
1991	"Finally"	Top Dance/Urban Singles	#14

=== Netherlands ===
Nederlandse Top 40

Dutch Top 40 is one of the three official singles charts in the Netherlands. Apart from Single Top 100, the Top 40 and Mega Top 50 include airplay data (i.e. the more often a song is played on the radio, the higher it is placed also in the chart). Peniston scored in one Dutch singles year-end chart (compiled by the Top 40 list) of 1992 with two her songs:

Year	Nominated work	Category	Result
1992	"Finally"	Top Pop Singles	#60
1992	"We Got a Love Thang"	Top Pop Singles	#79

=== United Kingdom ===
Music Week

UK Top 75 is compiled by The Official Charts Company (OCC) and published in Music Week magazine. The full list of Top 200 selling singles/albums in the United Kingdom is published exclusively in ChartsPlus. Unlike the U.S. charts, no airplay statistics are used for the UK list.

Year	Nominated work	Category	Result
1992	Herself	Top Selling Singles Artists	#20
1992	"Finally"	Top Selling Singles	#41
1992	"We Got a Love Thang"	Top Selling Singles	#88
1992	"Keep On Walkin'"	Top Selling Singles	#121

=== United States ===
American Top 40

American Top 40 is an international independent radio program that counts down the forty most popular songs in the United States of America. However apart from the US, the show is distributed by Premiere Radio Networks also in Canada, Australia, the Philippines, Singapore, China, India, the United Kingdom, Malaysia and several other territories. The AT40 charts are based on Mediabase data, published each Tueasday in USA Today. From 1990 to 1994, AT40 compiled its own year-end charts, which were very close to Billboard's, actually.

Year	Nominated work	Category	Result
1992	"Finally"	Top Pop Singles	#10
1992	"Keep On Walkin'"	Top Pop Singles	#46
1992	"We Got a Love Thang"	Top Pop Singles	#79

Billboard

The U.S. Billboard Year-End charts are a cumulative measure of a single or album's performance in the United States, based upon the Billboard magazine charts during any given chart year. Peniston topped one U.S. end of year chart, being nominated in total twenty-nine times:

Year	Nominated work	Category	Result
1991	"Finally"	Top Dance (Music) Club Play Singles	#25
1991	"Finally"	Top Dance Music 12-Inch Singles Sales	#42
1992	"Finally"	Top Pop Singles	#20
1992	"We Got a Love Thang"	Top Pop Singles	#97
1992	"Keep On Walkin'"	Top Pop Singles	#61
1992	"Keep On Walkin'"	Top R&B Singles	#37
1992	Finally	Top R&B Albums	#29
1992	"Finally"	Top Dance Music Maxi-Singles Sale	#48
1992	"We Got a Love Thang"	Top Dance Music Maxi-Singles Sale	#20
1992	"We Got a Love Thang"	Top Dance Music Club Play Singles	#16
1992	"Keep On Walkin'"	Top Dance Music Club Play Singles	#32
1994	Herself	Top Pop Singles Artists	#73
1994	Herself	Top Pop Singles Artists - Female	#14
1994	Herself	Top R&B Artists	#23
1994	Herself	Top R&B Artists - Female	#7
1994	Herself	Top R&B Singles Artists	#15
1994	"I'm Not Over You"	Top R&B Singles	#32
1994	"I'm in the Mood"	Top R&B Singles	#42
1994	"I'm in the Mood"	Top R&B Singles Airplay	#31
1994	"I'm Not Over You"	Top R&B Singles Airplay	#32
1994	"I'm Not Over You"	Top R&B Singles Sales	#68
1994	Thought 'Ya Knew	Top R&B Albums	#71
1994	Herself	Top Dance Music Club Play Artists	#1
1994	Herself	Top Dance Music Maxi-Singles Sales Artists	#15
1994	"I'm Not Over You"	Top Dance Music Club Play Singles	#9
1994	"Hit by Love"	Top Dance Music Club Play Singles	#24
1994	"I'm in the Mood"	Top Dance Music Club Play Singles	#44
1994	"I'm in the Mood"	Top Dance Music Maxi-Singles Sales	#42
2001	"Lifetime to Love"	Top Dance Music Club Play Singles	#30

Cashbox

Cashbox, the most prominent competitor of Billboard and Record World (previously known as Music Vendor), was a weekly magazine that published charts of song popularity in the United States of America.

Year	Nominated work	Category	Result
1992	"Finally"	Top Pop Singles	#73
1992	"Keep On Walkin'"	Top Pop Singles	#100

Club Chart

Club Chart is a U.S. list of Top 50 dance music/electronic songs. The chart is compiled monthly by a panel of DJs from across the States since 2003, and published via DanceMusic.about.com, an online resource.

Year	Nominated work	Category	Result
2007	"Shame Shame Shame"	Top Club Singles^{[D]}	#85

Notes

- D The song shared the 85th position in the Club Year-End chart with Nelly Furtado's hit Maneater in common.

Record Research

Record Research Inc. was founded by the world-renowned musicologist Joel Whitburn who, along with a team of researchers, examines in detail all of Billboard's music and video charts in addition. His annual pop listings therefore differ.

Year	Nominated work	Category	Result
1992	Herself	Top Pop Artists	#9
1992	"Finally"	Top Pop Singles	#35
1992	"We Got a Love Thang"	Top Pop Singles	#105
1992	"Keep On Walkin'"	Top Pop Singles	#89
1992	"Inside That I Cried"	Top Pop Singles	#350
1992	"Crazy Love"	Top Pop Singles	#362
1994	"I'm in the Mood"	Top Pop Singles	#122
1994	"I'm Not Over You"	Top Pop Singles	#152
1994	"Hit by Love"	Top Pop Singles	#314
1996	"Movin' On"	Top Pop Singles	#271

Traxsource

Traxsource is a leading U.S.-based dance music digital music downloads site that specialize in Underground music (such as House, Soulful, Deep, Jackin, Tech, Electro, Progressive, Indie Dance, Space Disco, Soul/Funk/Disco), providing various bitrates and formats for each download.

Year	Nominated work	Category	Result
2007	"I'm Feelin' U"	Top 100 Singles	#10

=== Others ===
Music VF

Music VF is a music database combining the U.S. and UK music charts entries since the 19th century. The U.S. charts information is based on Billboard's charts, while the British on the Official UK Charts Company stats.

Year	Nominated work	Category	Result
1991	Herself	Top Pop Artists	#72
1991	"Finally"	Top Pop Songs	#58
1991	"Finally"	Top R&B Songs	#24
1991	"Finally"	Top Dance Songs	#21
1992	Herself	Top Pop Artists	#14
1992	"We Got a Love Thang"	Top Pop Songs	#62
1992	"Keep On Walkin'"	Top Pop Songs	#63
1992	"Keep On Walkin'"	Top R&B Songs	#33
1992	"We Got a Love Thang"	Top R&B Songs	#32
1992	"We Got a Love Thang"	Top Dance Songs	#21
1992	"Keep On Walkin'"	Top Dance Songs	#22
1994	Herself	Top Pop Artists	#46
1994	"I'm in the Mood"	Top Dance Songs	#21

== Beauty pageants ==
=== Miss Black Arizona ===
The Miss Black Arizona Scholarship Pageant was developed to promote cultural awareness and celebration of black women and girls in the state of Arizona. The program is open to contestants ages 3–27 with six divisions and titles granted each year.

Year	Nominated work	Category	Result
1989	Herself	Miss Black Arizona	Won

=== Miss Galaxy ===
Miss Galaxy is a beauty contest for girls and women between 16 and 28 years old, with eligibility requirements of size XS/S/M.

Year	Nominated work	Category	Result
1990	Herself	Miss Galaxy	Won

== Other honors ==
Year	Nominated work	Category	Result
?	Herself	Governor's Key to the State of Arizona	Honored
?	Herself	Phoenix College Hall of Fame	Honored

== See also ==
- CeCe Peniston's discography
- List of artists who reached number one on the US Dance chart
