= Nothing Can Stop Me =

Single by CeCe Peniston
- Released: June 25, 2014
- Recorded: 2014
- Length: 3:28
- Label: S1EG

CeCe Peniston singles chronology
"Without You" (2014)	"Nothing Can Stop Me" (2014)	"Love Don't Take Over" (2014)

"Nothing Can Stop Me" is a 2014 song by the singer CeCe Peniston, released as her first release on S1EG label. Two weeks prior to its release, the work was presented on a free download mixed compilation R&B Is Not Dead Vol. 1 by OhSoKool. It gained an urban adult contemporary airplay, peaking for four weeks at number twenty-nine on the Adult R&B Songs.

== Track listings and formats ==
MD, EU & US; CD-R, US

1. "Nothing Can Stop Me" – 3:28

MD, US

1. "Nothing Can Stop Me" (Dance Mix) – 5:03

== Credits and personnel ==
- Cecilia Peniston – lead vocals

== Charts ==
Chart (2014)	Peak position
US Hot Adult R&B Airplay	29
