= You Are the Universe =

Single by Brand New Heavies

Single by the Brand New Heavies

from the album Shelter
- B-side: "Remix"
- Released: 16 June 1997
- Recorded: 1997
- Genre: Acid jazz; funk
- Length: 4:11 (Album version)
- Label: FFRR; London
- Songwriters: Andrew Levy; Siedah Garrett
- Producer: The Brand New Heavies

The Brand New Heavies singles chronology
"Sometimes" (1997)	"You Are the Universe" (1997)	"You've Got a Friend" (1997)

Music video
- "You Are the Universe" on YouTube

"You Are the Universe" is a song by British acid jazz and funk group the Brand New Heavies, released in June 1997. The composition was issued as the third single taken from their fourth album, Shelter (1997), which remains the only Brand New Heavies album recorded with American singer Siedah Garrett, who afterwards left the group to concentrate on her own songwriting. The song charted at number twenty-one in UK, and at number eleven within the British Chart-Track.

== Critical reception ==
British magazine Music Week rated the song four out of five, writing, "Their sound is as retro as ever, but this funky soul tune is hugely uplifting and deserves to be a big pop, as well as club, hit." Daisy & Havoc from the RM Dance Update gave it five out of five. They added, "If 'Sometimes' is starting to drive you crazy then this next single (surely the best song on the Shelter album) is here to take you to a higher plane. The remixers have a job competing with the huge uplift value of the album version (which is on a par with the original of Nu Yorican Soul's 'It's Alright')".

== Track listings and formats ==
- 12", JP, #BAD004
1. "You Are the Universe" (Original Version)
2. "You Are the Universe" (Instrumental)
- CD, UK, #850 918-2
1. "You Are the Universe" (Radio Version) - 3:41
2. "You Are the Universe" (Curtis & Moore's Universal Summer Groove 7") - 3:42
- 12", UK, #BNHX9
1. "You Are the Universe" (Roger's Universal Mix) - 7:42
2. "You Are the Universe" (Curtis & Moore's Universal Summer Groove) - 9:08
3. "You Are the Universe" (Interfearance Remix)
4. "You Are the Universe" (Tuff Jam Special Rub) - 6:59
- 12", UK, Promo, #BNXDJ 9
1. "You Are the Universe" (Roger's Universal Mix) - 7:42
2. "You Are the Universe" (S-Man's Mongoloid Millennium Dub)
3. "You Are the Universe" (Curtis & Moore's Universal Summer Groove) - 9:08
4. "You Are the Universe" (Curtis & Moore's Basement Dub) - 5:55
- 12", UK, Promo, #BXXDJ 9
1. "You Are the Universe" (Interfearance Remix)
2. "You Are the Universe" (Interfearance Unidub)
3. "You Are the Universe" (Tuff Jam's 2 in 1 Remix) - 8:21
4. "You Are the Universe" (Tuff Jam Special Rub) - 6:59
- CD, EU & UK, #42285 09212/BNCDP 9/850 921-2
- CD, UK, #42285 09212, #BNCDP 9
1. "You Are the Universe" (Original Version) - 3:40
2. "Back to Love" (Original Version) - 4:09
3. "Stay This Way" (Original Version) - 3:46
4. "Dream on Dreamer" (Original Version) - 3:34
- MCD, EU, #850 919-2
- MCD, EU & UK, #BNHCD 9/850 919-2
1. "You Are the Universe" (Radio Version) - 3:41
2. "You Are the Universe" (Curtis & Moore's Universal Summer Groove 7") - 3:42
3. "You Are the Universe" (Opaz Remix) - 4:26
4. "You Are the Universe" (Roger's Universal 7" Edit) - 3:50
5. "You Are the Universe" (Curtis & Moore's Universal Summer Groove) - 9:08
- 12", IT, #ZAC 215
1. "You Are the Universe" (Roger's Universal Mix) - 7:42
2. "You Are the Universe" (Curtis & Moore's Basement Dub) - 5:55
3. "You Are the Universe" (Curtis & Moore's Universal Summer Groove) - 9:08
4. "You Are the Universe" (Tuff Jam's 2 in 1 Remix) - 8:21
5. 'You Are the Universe" (S. Man's Mongoloid Millennium Dub) - 6:34
6. "You Are the Universe" (Tuff Jam Special Rub) - 6:59
- 4x 12", UK, #BNHXX 09
1. "You Are the Universe" (Roger's Universal Mix) - 7:42
2. "You Are the Universe" (Curtis & Moore's Universal Summer Groove) - 9:08
3. "You Are the Universe" (Interfearance Remix)
4. "You Are the Universe" (Tuff Jam's 2 in 1 Remix) - 8:21
5. "You Are the Universe" (S-Man's Mongoloid Millennium Dub)
6. "You Are the Universe" (Interfearance Unidub)
7. "You Are the Universe" (Curtis & Moore's Basement Dub) - 5:55
8. "You Are the Universe" (Tuff Jam Special Rub) - 6:59
9. "You Are the Universe" (Opaz Remix)
10. "You Are the Universe"

== Credits and personnel ==
- Brand New Heavies – lead vocals, producer
- Andrew Levy – writer
- Siedah Garrett – writer
- Spike Stent – mix
- Henry Binns – programming
- Boyowa "Yoyo" Olugbo – engineer

== Charts ==
=== Weekly charts ===
Chart (1997)	Peak position
Europe (Eurochart Hot 100)	54
UK (GfK Chart-Track)	11
UK (Top 75 Singles)	21
UK Dance (OCC)	3

=== Year-end charts ===
Chart (1997)	Position
UK Club Chart (Music Week)	81

== Full Flava version ==
"You Are the Universe"
- The cover of the Japanese vinyl release

Single by Full Flava featuring CeCe Peniston

from the album Music Is Our Way of Life
- B-side: "Remix"
- Released: 5 July 2006
- Recorded: 2006
- Length: 5:25 (album version)
- Label: Dôme
- Songwriters: Andrew Levy; Siedah Garrett
- Producers: Rob Derbyshire; DJ Hasebe (remix co-producer)

CeCe Peniston singles chronology
"Deeper Love" (2005)	"You Are the Universe" (2006)	"I'm Feelin' U" (2007)

"You Are the Universe" was covered by Rob Derbyshire and Paul Mullings, the Birmingham's R&B production duo better known as Full Flava. It features vocals by CeCe Peniston. The Flava's version was remixed by DJ Hasebe, a Japanese hip-hop producer, and issued only on vinyl in the Japan.

The song was included on the Flava's album Music Is Our Way of Life, which reconstructed eleven dancefloor classics performed by various female vocalists, released on Dôme Records the following year, in 2007.

=== Track listings and formats ===
- 12", UK, #12 DOME 769
1. "You Are the Universe" (Universal Flava Mix) – 5:02
2. "You Are the Universe" (Radio Edit) – 3:49
- 12", JP, #12 DOME 770
1. "You Are the Universe" (DJ Hasebe Remix) – 4:56
2. "You Are the Universe" (DJ Hasebe Instrumental Mix) – 4:56
- MD, UK, #(–)
1. "You Are the Universe" (LP Version) – 5:23
2. "You Are the Universe" (Universal Flava Mix) – 5:02
3. "You Are the Universe" (Radio Edit) – 3:49

=== Credits and personnel ===
- CeCe Peniston – lead vocal
- Rob Derbyshire – producer
- Full Flava – mix
- Hasebe Daisuke – remix, co-producer
