= Merry Arizona Two: Desert Stars Shine at Christmas =

Compilation album by various artists
- Released: 1996
- Recorded: 1996
- Length: 45:53
- Label: United Cerebral Palsy
- Producers: Otto D'Agnolo; Art Dixie; Arthur Thompson; Clarke Rigsby; Kevin Stoller; Bergen White; Glen Campbell; Ken Hardling; Turning Point; Demitri Sahnas; Jeff Dayton; Marie Ravenscroft

United Cerebral Palsy's Christmas albums chronology
Merry Arizona: Desert Stars Shine at Christmas (1995)	Merry Arizona Two: Desert Stars Shine at Christmas (1996)	Merry Arizona 97: Desert Stars Shine at Christmas (1997)

Merry Arizona Two: Desert Stars Shine at Christmas is the second Christmas compilation album released by United Cerebral Palsy, a leading service provider and advocate for children and adults with disabilities, including cerebral palsy.

Released in 1996, it featured covers of Christmas carols by Arizona artists including Alice Cooper, CeCe Peniston, Emilio Castillo, Turning Point, and The Kingston Trio. Proceeds from the album went to multiple sclerosis research.

== Track listing ==
No.	Title	Writer(s)	Performer(s)	Length
1.	"The Christmas Song"	Mel Tormé, Bob Wells	CeCe Peniston	3:29
2.	"Angels We Have Heard on High"	Traditional	Kevin Stoller	5:16
3.	"The First Noel"	Traditional	Khani Cole Band	5:22
4.	"Little Drummer Boy"	Katherine K. Davis, Onorati, Harry Simeone	Glen Campbell	3:57
5.	"I'll Be Home for Christmas"	Buck Ram, Kim Gannon, Walter Kent	Turning Point	3:51
6.	"O Little Town of Bethlehem (Interlude)"	Phillips Brooks, Lewis Redner	Ron Herndon	0:30
7.	"Deck the Halls"	Traditional	ASU Concert Choir	1:20
8.	"Fox 10's Gone Home For Christmas"	Jolly Demis	Jolly Demis	3:50
9.	"She's Coming Home"	The Whalers	Frank Lloyd Vinyl	3:36
10.	"Is There a Santa?"	(unknown)	Alice Cooper	4:29
11.	"Children Go Where I Send Thee"	Traditional	The Kingston Trio	2:34
12.	"Home for the Holidays"	Robert Allen, Al Stillman	The Herndon Brothers	3:35
13.	"'Twas the Night Before Christmas"	Clement Clarke Moore	Walt Richardson	3:44
14.	"Emilio Says 'Thank You'"	Emilio Castillo, Ray Riendeau	Emilio Castillo, Ray Riendeau	0:50
15.	"The Spirit of Christmas"	(unknown)	Little Raymie Herndon & His Dog Spotlite	2:30
Total length:				45:53

Additional notes

- "Angels We Have Heard on High" was previously released on Indio Records
- "Little Drummer Boy" was previously released on New Haven Records
- "I'll Be Home for Christmas" was previously released by Sahnas Music
- "The Spirit of Christmas" was previously released on Rowdy Records

== Credits and personnel ==
- Otto D'Agnolo - producer, arranger, engineer
- Art Dixie - arranger, piano, keyboards, drum programming, producer
- Arthur Thompson - arranger, vocal arranger, drum programming, producer
- CeCe Peniston - vocal arranger, lead vocal
- Alice Cooper - lead vocal
- Glen Campbell - lead vocal

- Jeff Kollman - guitar
- Kevin Stoller - arranger, piano, keyboards, producer
- Bob Willocks - bass
- Harvey Mason - drums
- Clarke Rigsby - engineer, producer
- Todd Chuba - percussion
- Jerry Donato - saxophone
- Al Ortiz - back vocal, guitar, bass
- Michael Florio - back vocal, drums, percussion
- Claudia Bloom - piano, keyboards
- Khani Cole - lead vocal
- John Willis - acoustic guitar
- Bergen White - arranger
- Jana King - back vocal
- Jon Ivey - back vocal
- Lisa Silver - back vocal
- Lura Foster - back vocal
- Toby Parrish -bagpipes
- David Hungate - bass
- Owen Hale - drums
- Dan Huff - electric guitar
- Warren Peterson - engineer
- Larry Jefferies - engineer assistant
- Robert Charles - engineer assistant
- Jim Horne - flute
- Tom McAninch - french horn
- Cynthia Wyatt - harp
- Shane Keister - keyboards
- Booby Taylor - oboe
- Farrell Morris - percussion
- Glen Campbell - producer
- Ken Hardling - producer
- Nashville String Machine - strings
- Dennis Good - trombone
- Ernie Collins - bass trombone
- Dan Oxley - trumpet
- Don Sheffield - trumpet
- Richard Steffern - trumpet
- Demitri Sahnas - bass, engineer, producer
- Bruce Stodola - drums
- Thano Sahnas - engineer, guitar
- Michael Broening - keyboards
- John Herrera - percussion
- Turning Point - producer
- Wes Marshall - trumpet, flugelhorn
- Mario Mendivil - bass
- Steve Hargrave - drums
- David Robinson - guitar
- Jolly Demis - writer
- Nick Jones- bass
- Perry Senn - drums, back vocal
- Allen Abbassi - lead guitar
- Jason McGraw - rhythm guitar
- John Kinerk - vocals
- Candace D'Agnolo - assistant engineer
- Janet Green - harpsichord, tambourine, bells
- The Kingston Trio - arranger, vocals
- Tom Golden - bass
- Teri Coté - drums, cabasa, handclaps
- Jeff Dayton - producer, arranger, guitar, back vocal, tambourine, handclaps
- George Grove - vocal, banjo
- Bob Shane - vocal, guitar
- Nick Reynolds - vocal, guitar
- Sean Paddock -drums
- Ron Herndon - keyboards
- Rick Pacella - vocal, bass
- Duane Wriston - vocal, guitar
- Ol Ortiz - arranger
- Walt Richardson - arranger, vocal arranger, guitar, drums, programming
- Aria Florio - back vocal
- Erin Florio - back vocal
- Felix Sainz - bass
- Joe Morris - drums
- Emilio Santiago - percussion
- Ray Riendeau - guitar
- Marie Ravenscroft - executive producer
- Bob Carey - photography
- Georgianna D'Agnolo - assistant producer

== The list of 'Merry Arizona' compilations ==
Year	Title
1995	Merry Arizona: Desert Stars Shine at Christmas
1996	Merry Arizona Two: Desert Stars Shine at Christmas
1997	Merry Arizona 97: Desert Stars Shine at Christmas
1998	Merry Arizona: Gems of Melody and Rhythm
1999	Merry Arizona: Happy Trails

== See also ==
- List of artists who reached number one on the US Dance chart
