= CeCe Peniston =

American singer (born 1969)

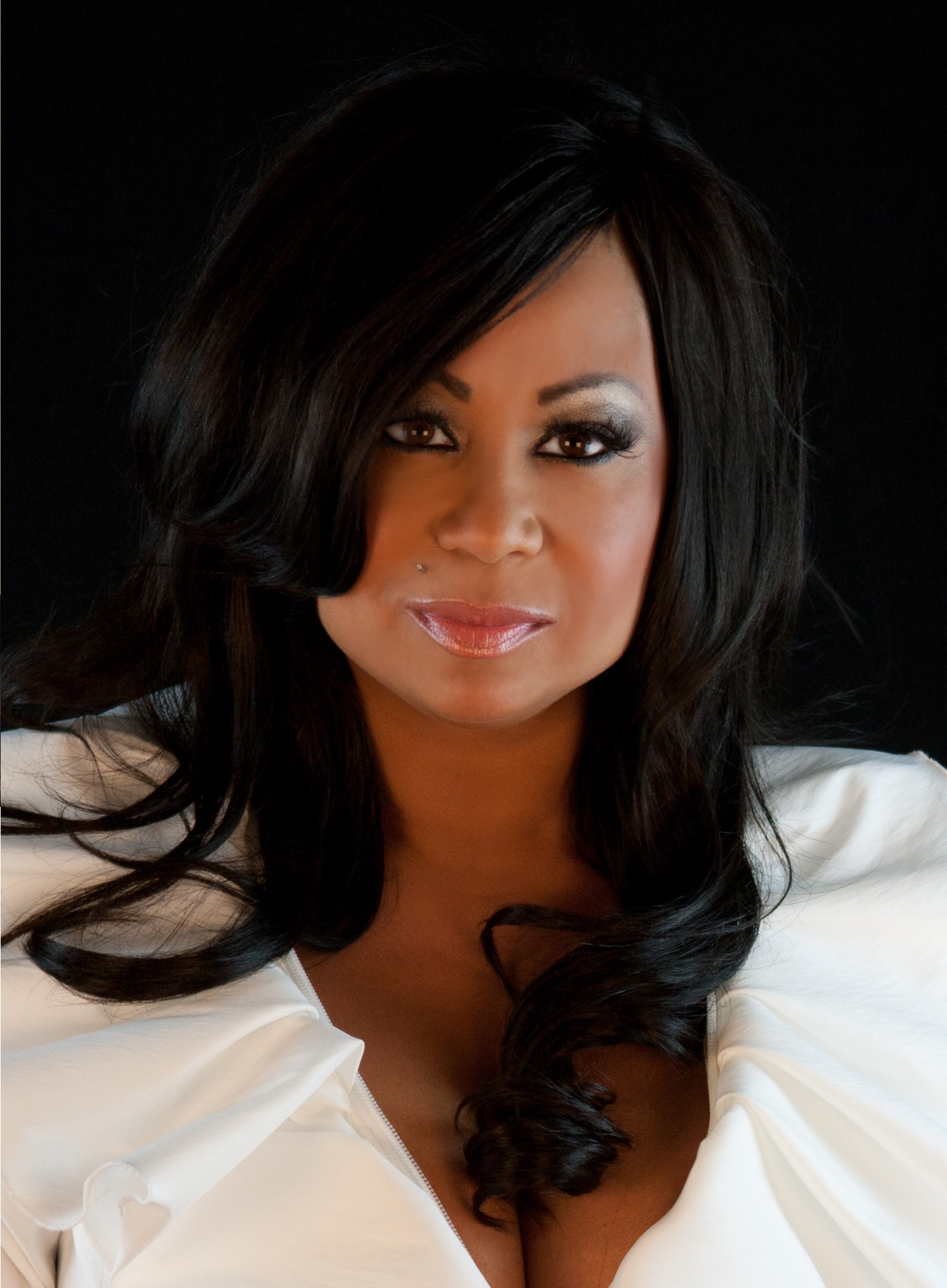
- Peniston in March 2012
- Born: Cecilia Veronica Peniston; September 6, 1969 (age 57); Dayton, Ohio, U.S.
- Education: Phoenix College
- Occupations: Singer; songwriter; actress
- Years active: 1991–present
- Spouses: Malik Byrd (m. 1992; div. 1993) Frank Martin (m. 2003; div. 2011)
- Partner: Marcus Matthews (2015–16)
- Musical career
- Genres: House; dance; R&B; pop; soul; new jack swing
- Instrument: Vocals
- Labels: A&M; Warner Bros.; Universal
- Website: cecepeniston.com

Cecilia Veronica "CeCe" Peniston (/siːˈsiː ˈpɛnɪstən/; born September 6, 1969) is an American singer and former beauty queen. In the early 1990s, she scored five number one hits on the U.S. Billboard Hot Dance Music/Club Play. Her signature song "Finally" reached No. 5 on the US Hot 100 and No. 2 in the UK.

Peniston has performed at private engagements for Aretha Franklin's private birthday party in Detroit, Michigan, Pope John Paul II in Rome at the Vatican (as a member of the gospel band Sisters of Glory) and the 42nd President of the United States, Bill Clinton, during both of his inauguration ceremonies in Washington, D.C. She was the first foreign female entertainer to perform in post-apartheid South Africa. According to Peniston, her vocal range vacillates between "five to seven octaves".

In February 2011, Peniston signed a record deal with West Swagg Music Group/Bungalo Records, with full distribution through Universal Music Group Distribution, and announced the release of a new solo album 15 years after her last studio set (I'm Movin' On from 1996 on A&M Records). By the end of the year, however, only three digital singles had been issued including a new song called "Stoopid!", and two cover versions of her prior hits, "Keep On Walkin'" and "Finally".

In December 2016, Billboard magazine listed her among the 100 Top Dance Club Artists of All Time (as the 52nd).

== Life & career ==
=== Early life and education ===
Peniston was born in Dayton, Ohio, but spent the majority of her formative years in Phoenix, Arizona, where she was raised from the age of nine. She is the third of four siblings. The daughter of Ronald Peniston, a military veteran and Barbara Anne, she started singing at church and doing plays and musicals such as H.M.S. Pinafore in the 6th grade. She participated in local karaoke contests and singing talent shows, while taking piano lessons.

She attended Trevor G. Browne High School, class of 1987, in Phoenix, and landed a part in a local theater group's production of Bubblin' Brown Sugar (playing the young Sweet Georgia Brown). After earning her diploma, she continued to study liberal arts at Phoenix College, where she got involved in athletics, and entered beauty pageants. She was crowned Miss Black Arizona in 1989.

Peniston began writing pop lyrics while at school. The words of her international hit "Finally" were penned during a chemistry class, while thinking about dating in college.

=== 1990–91: Female Preacher ===
You know what's so funny is I was always the one that came in and slowed it down. That's what's so ironic about me putting out "Finally", because I was always the R&B person, the balladeer when I came in and did everything. Back then, there was a female rapper [Overweight Pooch] who was on A&M, and I was asked to do some background vocals. I came over, did the background vocals for her and the label heard it. They were like "We really like your flow, why don't you get your own single together?" Well at the time, I was writing poetry. So I took one of the poems, "Finally". I was thinking about dating in college, and how I hadn't found that Mr. Right. We went to the studio, finished it up, sent it off to the label and they loved it. And that's how everything got started. I came up with the melody and the lyrics to "Finally" and then R.K. [Jackson] and Felipe [Delgado], the guys I was working with at the time, put the music to it.

— said by Peniston interviewed by 5 Chicago in 2006

Her music career began in January 1991, when Felipe "DJ Wax Dawg" Delgado, her friend and a record producer based also in Phoenix, asked Peniston to record back-up vocals for Tonya Davis, a black female rapper known as Overweight Pooch after her childhood nickname.

Davis, headed in a direction of a new Monie Love, was searching for a singer to add vocals to the title track of her album Female Preacher, which was to be released on A&M Records that summer. At a talent show she met a woman named Malaika LeRae Sallard, but when it came time to get Sallard into the studio, the rapper found she'd lost her future label-mate's number. When Delgado, who'd preferred Peniston instead, brought his favorite in to do background parts, the response from everyone was immediate, but did not move the Pooch to invite Peniston back for more vocals – unless she was successful in locating Sallard.

Later, as it became clear that Peniston was leaping from the Overweight Pooch's album to the top of the charts, rumor had it the Pooch was stewing over Peniston's using Female Preacher as her springboard. Tonya Davis, pregnant at the time of recording her album, swore she harbored no jealousy towards Peniston. "There's no jealousy, because she has a voice. I gave her the chance, but I didn't give her a voice," the rapper insisted for Phoenix New Times in July 1992, and Peniston, interviewed by the same newspaper in the meantime, reacted by her own words. "I feel like anything's possible and I know one thing. If I wasn't at this spot, I still would be achieving to get to this spot." Ironically enough, Sallard eventually threw in a few back-up vocals for Peniston on a song with a significant title, "You Win, I Win, We Lose", while Peniston, who in return played an agent to get a record deal also for Malaika (whose album Sugar Time scored in 1993 two Top 5 hits on the US Dance chart, including the No. 1 single "Gotta Know (Your Name)") mentioned the Pooch's name on her own debut album in addition, leaving Davis a note saying "thanks for letting me be a part of Female Preacher".

Besides Peniston's vocal performance on three tracks in total, of which "I Like It" was released as a single with a moderate success (at No. 16 in US Dance and No. 58 in UK Singles Chart the following January), she was eventually given also a credit for co-writing two of those, "Kickin' Da Blues" and the title's, "Female Preacher". But the Overweight Pooch's album flopped on the market, and A&M was the first major label for Delgado himself, who was facing contractual disputes with the record company. After Manny Lehman (a DJ, then A&M Art Director and one of the executive producers of Female Preacher) also noticed the powerful voice of a still back-up vocalist, he offered Delgado a second chance, and commissioned him to produce a track for Peniston herself as a solo artist. Not looking to lose his major deal connections, Delgado called on music producer Rodney K. Jackson, who she had met through mutual friends in Arizona, who was brought to the A&M family to help co-produce Peniston's single, which was soon to be recognized as "Finally".

Despite an initial label's resistance to sign Peniston to more than a one-off single deal, the "Finally" session resulted in recording her own debut album after the final approval of A&M's Vice President, Mark Mazzetti.

=== 1991–92: Finally ===
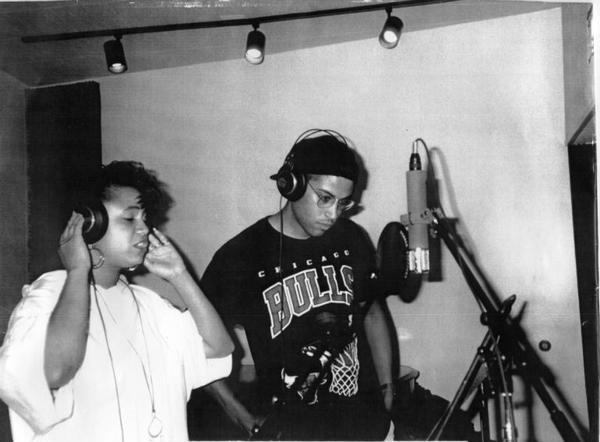
Peniston with Felipe Delgado at Chaton Studios in Phoenix, Arizona, putting final touches to her debut album

I was sitting in a Chicago pizza parlor in October and I heard over the radio 'Finally by CeCe Peniston'. I just started looking around going 'That's me! That's me!"

— Peniston recalled for EW magazine in 1992. (Almost 20 years later, when asked by Mega 104.3, she denied saying it, during her interview broadcast live on April 5, 2011.)

Peniston was 21 years old when her debut single "Finally" was released. The song burst on to the US club scene in the fall of 1991, where it became an instant dance anthem peaking, in October, at the top of the Billboard Hot Dance Music/Club Play for two weeks, while achieving a respectful starting position (at No. 29) overseas.

After her first song climbed the international charts, Peniston was headed into the studio to record a full-length album. However, she "had two months to pull the whole album together" and "didn't realize the impact the record was having until it reached the top five". She also described how difficult it was to begin her career at such an extreme pace, but the result was a solidly produced ten track collection titled Finally, issued in January of the following year.

Both the single and album entered the US Hot 100, as well as the UK Top 75 chart (at No. 5 and No. 2 for single, respectively at No. 70), and at No. 10 for album release and ultimately earned Peniston a gold or silver certification in both countries. By the end of 1992 her debut (in Europe re-released in 1997 with a bonus remix "Finally '97") sold over 540,000 in United States.

"We Got a Love Thang", the second single (co-written by Chantay Savage), with a video clip in heavy rotation on TV music channels, went to No. 1 in the US Dance chart in February (No. 20 in the Hot 100), and in England (where "Finally" skipped to No. 2 eventually) "We Got a Love Thang" peaked at No. 6. Who provided backing vocals on the album remains a source of contention. While on her album Finally Darnnel Rush was credited, on its single release, the name of Kym Sims (who was a co-writer of "Keep On Walkin'") appeared as one of back-up vocalists.

With another hit record on the charts, Peniston began a year of touring clubs and small theaters in the US in support of her album. Her travels started with a series of shows in the Philippines, Japan, the United Kingdom, Germany, Spain and Italy, and after her return to the US, Peniston continued with such R&B acts as Joe Public, the Cover Girls, R. Kelly and LeVert. While on tour, "Keep On Walkin'", a hip hop swinging composition, joined the list of Peniston's three consecutively running hits, bringing Peniston in June her third No. 1 in the U.S. Billboard Hot Dance Music/Club Play chart (No. 15 in the Hot 100), and another Top 10 hit in the UK. Later in August, that was also her highest outing in the US R&B chart, scoring at No. 3.

On October 17, Billboard magazine announced that Peniston was the leading nominee in the Billboard Music Awards, being nominated in four categories: three times in the dance category with "Finally" (Best New Artist, Best Female Artist and Best Director), and one in the R&B/Rap category (Best Female Artist) for her urban hit "Keep On Walkin'". Ultimately the song won two awards, and three of her singles released in 1992 were listed also within the Top 100 songs of the Billboard Year-End chart (at No. 20 with "Finally", at No. 61 with "Keep On Walkin'", and at No. 97 with "We Got a Love Thang"). In the UK, Peniston was listed as the 20th of Top Selling Singles Artists in 1992.

Additional songs taken from album Finally achieved the Top 40 status at least in the hip hop/R&B field. The grieving lyrics of her ballad "Inside That I Cried", co-written by Peniston's then-husband, Malik Byrd (who appeared also in its video), and produced in conjunction with Anita Baker's cohort, Steve Lindsey, peaked at No. 10 in the US R&B (No. 94 in the Hot 100 and No. 42 in the UK chart. The fifth single, a midtempo, "Crazy Love", climbed to No. 31 (No. 97 in the Hot 100 and No. 44 in the UK).

By the end of the year, Peniston received several awards for her achievements in the music industry for 1992. Among them, one Billboard Music Award (as Best New Artist – Dance, the second went to the video director Claude Borenzweig), three ASCAP Awards (for Song of The Year, Most Performed Song of The Year, and Pop Songwriter of The Year), another three awards (as Best New Dance Artist, Best Dance Solo Artist, and for Best 12" Dance Record) at the Annual Winter Music Conference, and the BMI Urban Award of Achievement. The album itself was nominated on a Soul Train Music Award '93 in the Best R&B/Soul Album – Female category.

=== 1993–95: Thought 'Ya Knew ===
Within a year, Peniston was back in the studios to record her sophomore release, and the particular challenge for the vocalist was to avoid getting pigeonholed into the dance genre. For that reason, several ballads were arranged to appear on the final set (in the front with "Forever In My Heart", produced by Brian McKnight), of which, however, none was chosen for a single release. This time around, Peniston co-authored three of thirteen tracks ("Whatever It Is", "Give What I'm Givin" and "Maybe It's The Way", a ballad about her father), and along with Manny Lehman and Damon Jones, who later became Peniston's manager, she was also credited as an executive producer of her scheduled album release, Thought 'Ya Knew. Apart from others, also fellow Ohio-born singer Norma Jean Wright joined the session.

After a certain level of hesitation over the first single, "I'm in the Mood" (originally produced by Soulshock and Karlin) was picked to be the final leader—though as support for "Searchin'", which would be separately delivered on vinyl only to DJs. "I'm in the Mood" did well by itself, and with a video accompanied by a hip-hop remix from M-Doc & Jere M.C. (better known as In Da Soul) the title was on singles reproduced by David Morales for the dance floor. The song spawned Peniston's fourth No. 1 (dethroning from the top of the US Dance chart Aretha Franklin's "A Deeper Love") and peaked at No. 16 in the UK (No. 32 in the Hot 100).

I guess the title tells you where I'm coming from with the new album. It's like I Thought 'Ya Knew I could do it, that I was coming right backatcha, real and honest.

— Peniston stated in her A&M biography

On January 25, 1994, the album Thought 'Ya Knew, which was to represent Peniston's musical zenith at that time, arrived on all available formats, including digital compact cassettes. However, as the record promptly entered the music charts, it was soon to be evident Thought 'Ya Knew was not enjoying the high-profile success of her previous set Finally. After its progress had stalled in the Billboard 200 at No. 96, Thought 'Ya Knew climbed to No. 31 in the UK, but the album charted for only two weeks in the UK.

Not certain about the second single either, "Keep Givin' Me Your Love" was accepted to become the British follow-up. But the track, remixed by Eddie Gordon's West End production team, had no supporting music video, and after peaking at No. 36 in April in the United Kingdom, an alternative title ("I'm Not Over You") was chosen for the US market as the second cut from the Thought 'Ya Knew album.

"I'm Not Over You" (written by Steve Hurley, Jamie Principle, and M-Doc) might have missed the highest position of the US Dance chart, but only by about one point (at No. 2), and the single was later classified in the overall Billboard Hot Dance Music/Club Play chart as the ninth most successful track of 1994 (leaving "I'm in the Mood" far behind, at No. 44). However, although the song had sealed the Top 10 of the US R&B chart, it did not succeed in the Hot 100 that much, failing to crack Top 40 (No. 41). Considering that expectations of A&M Records company must have been bigger than a club play sale of Peniston's singles, "I'm Not Over You" was released in the UK only on B-side of the "Hit by Love" release.

"Hit by Love" was to be the third song taken from the album. As with her previous releases, the song (with additional remixes by David Morales) became Peniston's next US Dance hit in a line of her No. 1s, but while on the top of the chart "Hit by Love" stayed for another week, the single stuck at No. 33 in the UK Top 75, as well as on the bottom positions of the American Hot 100 chart (at No. 90).

Along with "Hit by Love" in the charts, A&M issued a rare compilation, Remix Collection, in Japan with nine alternate versions of her songs previously available only on vinyl, which tracked Peniston's music career since the "Keep On Walkin'" release. A similar remix collection, however, consisting of only two singles ("Finally" and "We Got a Love Thang"), was earlier issued in Japan as an EP under the title Finally / We Got a Love Thang: Remix Collection featuring overall eight remixed versions.

At the end of the year Peniston was named the No. 1 Billboard Hot Dance Music/Club Play Artist, summarizing all her songs released in 1994 ("I'm Not Over You" No. 9, "Hit by Love" No. 24, and I'm in the Mood" No. 44). While A&M was listed as the sixth best dance label in the Billboard Year-End chart, Peniston was also rated as the 5th Top R&B Singles Female Artist (behind Janet Jackson, Toni Braxton, Aaliyah and Mariah Carey).

In addition, a remix of "Keep Givin' Me Your Love" was popularized on the original motion picture soundtrack of the Prêt-à-Porter (Ready To Wear) film, and released in the U.S. after a one-year delay, scoring No. 4 in the US Dance charts in March 1995. "Keep Givin' Me Your Love" became Peniston's first song not to enter the Hot 100 chart (No. 101), possibly as the result of appearing as a B-side on her previous release, and sharing its sales with the single "Hit by Love".

I have a lot in me still that people haven't heard. There's a whole other side, there's an R&B side, a jazz side that people haven't heard, and think that they'd be really surprised. But I haven't had a chance to showcase that because people want to hear the house songs.

— said by Peniston in 2006

The Sisters of Glory

Between releases, Peniston made a jazzy cameo "Don't Forget the Love" with words and music by a Grammy Award-nominated composer, Jeff Lorber, and Eric Benét (also a later Grammy Award nominee) for his album West Side Stories. The title of the Lorber's album was his response to residing the West Side of L.A. (not an adaptation of songs from the musical West Side Story), and after its issue in November 1994, the studio record peaked at No. 5 in the Billboard's list of Top Contemporary Jazz albums.

As a member of the gospel quintet called The Sisters of Glory, which included Thelma Houston, Phoebe Snow, Lois Walden, Albertina Walker, and herself, Peniston also recorded a spiritual album, Good News in Hard Times, that featured two solo traditionals ("How I Got Over" and "Precious Memories") performed by Peniston, four standards with her solo part ("Rough Side of the Mountain", "He's Got the Whole World in His Hands", "I Won't Be Back No More" and "Oh Happy Day"), as well as her chorus vocals on additional nine tracks. Good News in Hard Times (produced by Jennifer Cohen and Lois Walden) was released in August 1995 on Warner Bros, and the album brought Peniston an entry also in the Billboard Top Gospel Albums list, where it reached in October No. 29, remaining in the chart for 6 weeks.

=== 1996–98: I'm Movin' On and The Best Of album ===
In February 1996, Billboard posted information that singer was putting the finishing touches to her new studio album, I'm Movin' On, slated for its release in May. Judging from the magazine's earlier preview of several cuts, Billboard published that Peniston was about to explore more mature jeep-soul fare a la Faith Evans, and that she has never sounded so assured and convincingly soulful. Though I'm Movin' On with a noticeably slimmed-down Peniston adorning its cover was not released until September, a similarly sleek sound marked its title single delivered to the radio stations on July 17, while hitting music stores one week later.

"Movin' On", the song considered as the strongest track to reach core R&B listeners with potential across several genres, was produced by Dave "Jam" Hall, the hit maker behind Mariah Carey's "Dreamlover", whose earlier work included also Madonna's Bedtime Stories album. The song cracked the Top 40 on the US R&B/Hip Hop at No. 29, but failed to show up in the UK chart, while scoring at weak No. 83 in the Hot 100.

On September 9, I'm Movin' On, the record with evident absence of her ever-dependable club workouts finally arrived. Peniston contributed to the set with three songs she co-wrote (except the title track, the ballad "The Last To Know" and a club potential, "Don't Know What To Do", that was not promoted). After peaking at No. 48 on the US R&B, the album passed by the Billboard Top 200 Albums chart, and soon largely fell victim to mismarketing.

"We named the album I'm Movin' On because it says a lot about me and who I am now in 1996. I'm moving on mentally, physically, spiritually and musically in every way."

Despite insistence from the Peniston's management to release "Somebody Else's Guy" as a follow-up, A&M label preferred an alternate composition, "Before I Lay (You Drive Me Crazy)", which featured Peniston's then-beau JoJo Hailey (of K-Ci & JoJo) who was supposed to help establish Peniston as an R&B artist. But the duet reached its top in the US R&B already at No. 52, with no entry in the Hot 100 chart (No. 121) or in England.

However, Peniston herself seemed to be not worried about losing her audience, when interviewed at the time of I'm Movin' On release by Billboard: "When you're first coming out as an artist, many times label executives have their own vision for you. But as you move forward, it's only fair that you begin determining your own direction. People will make the change with you as long as you're honest about your craft and display a comfort for what it is that you're doing," two years later Peniston actually confirmed her doubts, after being questioned by the magazine: "I can speak about this firsthand, believe me. Sometimes doing what you feel isn't always accepted by the public. You've got to choose where you want to go and be consistent," (said by the artist at the 5th annual Billboard Dance Music Summit that urged members of the dance music community to work together toward greater credibility, visibility and sales for the genre, held July 8–10 in 1998). After only two singles released from her R&B set, A&M did not decide to select a song that would cater to another music format, and capitulated to progress with I'm Movin' On album that Peniston promoted also during Bill Clinton's election campaign, on which she performed several track from the set. Clinton commented on her performance on November 4, 1996 in Sioux Falls, South Dakota, mentioning: "I want to thank CeCe Peniston for singing so beautifully."

Following her dismissal, Peniston took playing as Glinda the Good Witch in a theatrical production of musical play The Wiz. The staged concert was opened at Oakland's Paramount Theatre for a five-day run on June 11, 1997, and besides herself, Grace Jones and Peabo Bryson appeared to act.

In September, A&M re-released the single "Finally" that re-entered the UK Singles Chart (No. 26), and also her debut album on CD enhanced with the new remix, Finally (Classic Funk Radio Mix), both re-issued only in the overseas.

In February 1998, a David Morales remix of "Somebody Else's Guy", originally popularized by Jocelyn Brown and recorded for the album I'm Movin' On, became a hit in Europe, where it reached No. 13 in the UK Top 75 (as her last entry to date in England), as well as in April No. 26 in Japan, after being picked to promote Peniston's import greatest-hits collection simply titled The Best Of. The black and white photographs for its booklet were done by Daniela Federici, whose art work was noticed already on I'm Movin' On release, and later also on album and single covers of other female recording artists, such as Céline Dion, Toni Braxton, or Pink.

After her departure from A&M Peniston contributed with two songs to the M.C. Magic's compilation of various Phoenix-based artists called Desert Funk! that was issued on Nastyboy Records. The first title, "I Know You Want Me", was a hip-hop duet recorded in common with Nastyboy Klick (No. 109 on the US R&B), while the second, a Latino hip-hop ballad, "When I'm with You" was her own solo track also produced by Marcus Cardenas.

=== 1998–2000: Cancelled Nobody Else album ===
"Steve is really great at bringing out that attitude in me. He gave me a lot in terms of pronouncing words to make them sound like they need to sound, but that's not actually what you're saying. So it puts that vibe on it. So I learned a lot from him vocally as far as in the studio."

— Peniston about Steve Hurley

Rumors about Peniston working in Chicago on a new album with Steve "Silk" Hurley sprang up after "Nobody Else", a gospel-infused sirene and her debut on the producer's label, saw its official release in 1998. However, apart from the Billboard, the inlay details of "Nobody Else" also informed her fan base a studio album with the same title was due that summer, this information seemed to be rather optional than reality that followed the artist's future, while she had been signed to the Silk Entertainment company.

To make things surrounding her potential comeback even worse, ferocious house groove "Nobody Else", which was premiered at the 5th Annual Billboard Dance Music Summit on the stage at the Green Dolphin Street, failed to enter the music charts, despite favorable reviews of the Billboard that rated the song "among the artist's strongest recordings", "a sure to-thrill die hards", and as "a triumphant return to clubland" commenting in addition her summit live performance.

In 1999, "He Loves Me 2", co-written by M-Doc (known for a remix production for such major artists as Madonna, Janet Jackson or Keitha Sweat) to whom the singer returned the favor providing background vocals on "Keep It Real", a song recorded for his own album Young, Black, Rich and Famous, seemed to bring more competitive results than her previous endeavor, reaching No. 24 on the Hot Dance Club Play.

But Peniston's next single, "My Boo", with then already Grammy Award-nominee Hurley (apart from other five remixes for another artists, also for his own 'Silk's 12" Mix' of "He Loves Me 2", eventually lost in favor of Peter Rauhofer alias Club 69, who became the Remixer of the Year, Non-Classical, in 2000) happened to become disappointing again for both, and the last act distributed through the producer's record company. The song contained a sample of "The Bottle" by Gil Scott-Heron, one of the most important progenitors of rap music, at that time imprisoned for one to three years following series of drug possession charges.

=== 2000–present: Singles era ===
==== "Lifetime to Love" ====
While looking for alternative options for the cancelled production of her album, Peniston decided to make a step back and record a cover version of "Lifetime to Love", written by Steven Nikolas and Brendon Sibley, for her ex-major label producer and the Manny Lehman's compilation Circuit Sessions 00.1. The composition almost revived her No. 1 status in February 2001, returning her into the Billboard Hot Dance Music/Club Play list, and delivering her a Top 3 entry also in the millennium (No. 2). Although the song was at the end of the year classified as the 30th most successful US Dance track of 2001, it did not enter the official Hot 100 chart.

The digital version of "Lifetime to Love" was to be offered, along with photos and other information regarding Peniston, for free of charge download via Napster, an online music file-sharing service. Timing prevented the deal's follow-through, unfortunately, and singer left 4 Play label afterwards.

==== "Reminiscin" ====
Following the millennium Peniston, no longer part of the mainstream that brought her success in the early '90s, spent the first decade supporting numerous recording artists of various musical styles and influences who would keep her in the music industry and in the public eye mostly as a guest, but prominent vocalist.
In 2001, she collaborated with Ella Mae Saison, a singer from Philippines, on a common track. The duet partially mixed in France, and partially in N.Y.C., was sponsored by a multiple world-champion boxer, Evander Holyfield, and released on his record label in April. After its slow start, while being classified as the Billboard Hot Dance Breakout No. 1 for Maxi-Singles Sales category, the song hit No. 30 in US Dance chart eventually on August 18, under title "Reminiscin" and with Peniston being credited as a featuring artist.

Peniston later commented on her recording with Saison, "I had the pleasure of working with a very talented and inspiring artist by the name of Saison. Last January 2001, we collaborated on a duet, Reminiscin. I was fortunate to witness the warmth of a beautiful personality and the great talent of a rising star. I hope the world will be allowed to share in this experience too."

==== "For My Baby" and Colour of My Soul ====
Accompanied by a line-up of seven other female vocalists coming from both sides of the Atlantic, she joined Rob Derbyshire and Paul 'Solomon' Mullings, the Birmingham's R&B production duo known as Full Flava, to record lead vocals for their album Colour of My Soul. The modern soul set was to be made in England, released on Dôme Records in 2003, and one of the compositions performed by Peniston, "For My Baby", was later given also a treatment for the dance floor with stand-out house mixes from Dave "Leggz" Longmore and Sam Junior Bromfield known as Ruff 'N' Tumble, and duo KT & C.

"For My Baby" did not succeed on the music charts, however Ruf N Tumble's dance remixes of the song were based on a sample of the Delegation hit single "Heartache No. 9" (that scored at No. 57 in US Dance in 1980). Her second solo track on the Full Flava's compilation Colour of My Soul was titled "I Think about Him", and it was a mid-tempo that Peniston co-wrote with Derbyshire and Mullings.

==== "Eternal Lover" ====
Her next steps afterwards led to Better Days Studios in Paris where, for a change, singer was supposed to work with a French producer, Fréderic Tharreau alias BIBI, on exclusively import single "Eternal Lover". In addition to being released in France on RLPMix Records, the song was also issued in Australia and New Zealand on the domestic premier dance label, Vinyl Pusher Records, in 2004.

==== Gimme the Mike! and Hit Me, Baby, One More Time ====
Back to the States on 2 June 2005, Peniston appeared on the NBC network as a contestant of the summer's reality TV Hit Me, Baby, One More Time. During each program five former pop stars would sing their biggest hit plus a cover version of one contemporary hit, and every week the winner, picked by the studio audience, would get a donation of $20,000 in their name to a charity of free choice. Peniston competed on the show performing "Finally" plus a Faith Hill's song, "There You'll Be", in favor of a hip-hop group, Arrested Development (the final winner of the program that night). When two years later asked, while being interviewed by the Say What News online magazine, Peniston would not confirm to record "There You'll Be" also in the studio.

==== Pastor Jones and Don't Touch if You Ain't Prayed ====
In the first half of 2005, Peniston wrapped up shooting an independent film called Don't Touch if You Ain't Prayed. Her character was a forty-year-old Christian woman saving herself for marriage, and the film featured gospel music performed by herself. In addition, Peniston took a small part in another urban Gospel film appealing to Christian market, Pastor Jones.

On September 19, 2005, Peniston was invited to appear at Manhattan Center, Grand Ballroom, NYC, to be present at the 2nd Annual Dance Music Hall of Fame Induction Ceremony, along with Wanda Dee (of KLF), Nile Rodgers, Freddie Jackson, and Kathy Sledge. The Dance Music Hall of Fame, created by veteran John Parker in 2003, was supposed to recognize the contributions of those, who have had a significant impact on the evolution and development of dance music, and celebrate the history and significance of the genre. An awards ceremony announcing the inductees in the event was to take place annually at a formal dinner event in New York, but due to financial differences among the Board members, the Dance Music Hall of Fame ceased operations after its second ceremony (in 2005).

==== "Deeper Love" ====
Peniston's following music project was a common duet with David Longoria, a songwriter and trumpet player whose work was previously noticed on records of for example Sting and George Michael. The union became successful when a composition combining jazz and dance music, "Deeper Love", written and produced by Longoria, after six weeks on the chart climbed to No. 14 in the Billboard Hot Dance Music/Club Play (on November 19), returning Peniston lost dance chart positions since another duet ("Reminiscin") from 2001. The single was released with the copyright owned by Del Oro Music, and included eleven remixes from Junior Vasquez, Ryan Humphries, L.E.X., and Richard Earnshaw. According to David Longoria's official web site, the newest radio version of "Deeper Love - Robert Eibach Mix" is directed at Rhythmic Radio and dance clubs and was released in August 2024.

==== "You Are the Universe" and Music Is Our Way of Life ====
Interviewed by 5 Chicago magazine in June 2006, singer stated that she was, "working on another album," with George Jackson (a former manager of the Silk Entertainment label), Tre, and Ron Carroll, and expressed her wish to work with Steve Hurley as well back again. She further calculated to be done "within the next three or four months" with her studio record.

"I think people consider Diva as someone with a lot of soul, and I consider myself a person with a lot of soul, so I think the description would fit right."

— the artist said after critics mentioned on the strength of her performances the word "diva"

Instead, Peniston co-wrote with Jackson single "It's Alright" for RaShaan Houston, and took part in another proto-D'vas project, produced by Full Flava, to which she contributed with a Brand New Heavies hit from 1997 (No. 21 in the UK), "You Are the Universe". Her cover version was attached to Full Flava's retro album, Music Is Our Way of Life, which reconstructed eleven dancefloor classics in total, and the compilation was released on Dôme. The Peniston's track was remixed by a Japanese producer, DJ Hasebe, to be featured in his disco medley named after the song, and for the purpose of a limited-edition single available only in Japan on vinyl.

==== "EP Live" and Divas of Disco ====
On April 25, 2007, her icon stood on the stage of Avalon, Hollywood on the occasion of a five star concert Divas of Disco – Live, which included Thelma Houston, Linda Clifford, A Taste of Honey, France Joli and herself. Each diva performed overall three songs as a solo artist, while Peniston was the main star closing the night. Her performances of "Keep On Walkin'", the Donna Summer's cover version of "Last Dance", and "Finally" were released as a digital live EP on One Media Publishing the following year. The whole concert, titled Divas of Disco, was available in Europe on DVD on ZYX Music in 2008, as well as on CD in 2010, while in U.S. only its DVD release followed (on RSM Records in 2009).

==== "I'm Feelin' U" ====
In 2007, Peniston teamed up with US house DJ Ron Carroll for a funky bomb, "I'm Feelin' U", which was released in May on the Soulfuric Recordings label. The song caught an attention in the European clubland (No. 2 in the DJ House chart) The four-track single included also additional mixes from a French, DJ Fudge, and Brian Tappert, but as with her previous Japanese release ("You Are the Universe"), "I'm Feelin' U" was available for sale exclusively on vinyl, or as a digital single to be downloaded.

==== "Shame Shame Shame" ====
Her following promotional single, "Shame Shame Shame", released in the UK in June 2007, was co-written by Matt, Warren Meyers and Kelly Mueller, better recognized as Soulshaker (alias The Soul Shakers). The British music producers' team produced for Peniston a composition, which by the end of the year achieved several No. 1 statuses within specialized UK magazine charts (including No. 1 Music Week Pop Tip Chart, No. 1 Music Week Club Chart, and No. 1 DJ Mag Hype Chart). While in England Shame Shame Shame" was issued on the AATW label, in the States the title was released on Trackworks Records in several promo editions.

On August 26, 2007, one year after her interview for 5 Chicago Mag, Peniston mentioned again her plans regarding a new album project also for Say What News, however she did not go further this time. When asked, with whom from the industry she would like to once collaborate, she named the winner of twenty-two Grammy Awards, Stevie Wonder.

==== "Still I" ====
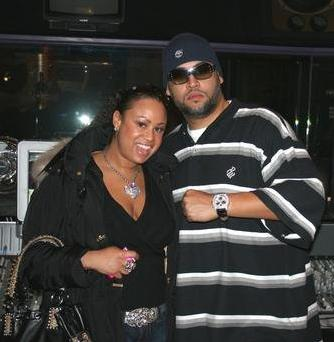
Also with Delgado after their reunion in 2007 at Chaton Studios

Originally, the potential release of an R&B song after a lengthy absence, "Still I", was to be cancelled, but the final record actually leaked out after one of the producers, allowed the Adrenaline Music company to distribute the song.
Behind the song's production were recognized Peniston's former folks from Arizona, Felipe Delgado and Jackson (both in charge of her initial hit, "Finally", from 1991) who reunited in 2005 to form a new production crew, collectively known as SandWorx, altogether with Nick "Cello" Valentine (which joined them in the spring of the following year). Though Peniston herself, who supported the trio by performing live in the Next In club in Scottsdale, Arizona, did not consider the record as strong enough to be offered for sale, "Still I" was eventually released as a four-track virtual single in September 2007, and the session that was supposed to rejoin the former producers with Peniston ended up with an apparent contradiction. The rest of to date unreleased recordings are songs titled "Wonder Woman", "Next to Me" and "Right Here".

==== "Above Horizons" ====
However, the year of 2008 also passed with no significant news regarding her new solo studio project, the following June Peniston released "Above Horizons", a national PTA anthem as a tribute to the families, teachers and communities who help children reach their dreams through the PTA, Parent Teacher Association, which resulted from her role being a National Ambassador of the US largest volunteer child advocacy organization. The ballad was written by Byron V. Garrett, Peniston, Erric Carrington, Essej and Marcus L. Barnum, and the CD promo release, issued on National PTA Recordings, included overall four versions. Among others, also two mixes from a Detroit house music producer and DJ, Aaron-Carl Ragland, who listed one of Peniston's compositions ("Nobody Else" from 1998) as one of his musical influences.

On June 17, 2009, Chicago Defender interviewed the artist, who declared that after over a decade she was about to finish recording her comeback album. Although she did not concrete its release date, Peniston revealed that she was working with such likes as Track Kingz West, Vudu, Status ("Above Horizons"), David Givens, Montell Jordan (on their common duet "He Say, She Say"), Mateo (on "Piece of That"), Isalene Elliot, and Ragland. "Once I reach an agreement and sign with a record company, the album will drop," she added. One month later, Peniston confirmed information regarding her new studio album live as a guest of the Wendy Williams birthday show, during which she performed "Finally". Subsequently, the diva allowed to prelisten a few of her new recordings to her community via her myspace.com page. Among them, the song "Runway" met with instant positive feedback due to its hip-hop/dance sound comparable to Timbaland's production. After a New York correspondent, Kenya Thomas, questioned Peniston for Skinny, she wished to subtitle the album CeCe. Her long-waited record would not be out even following years.

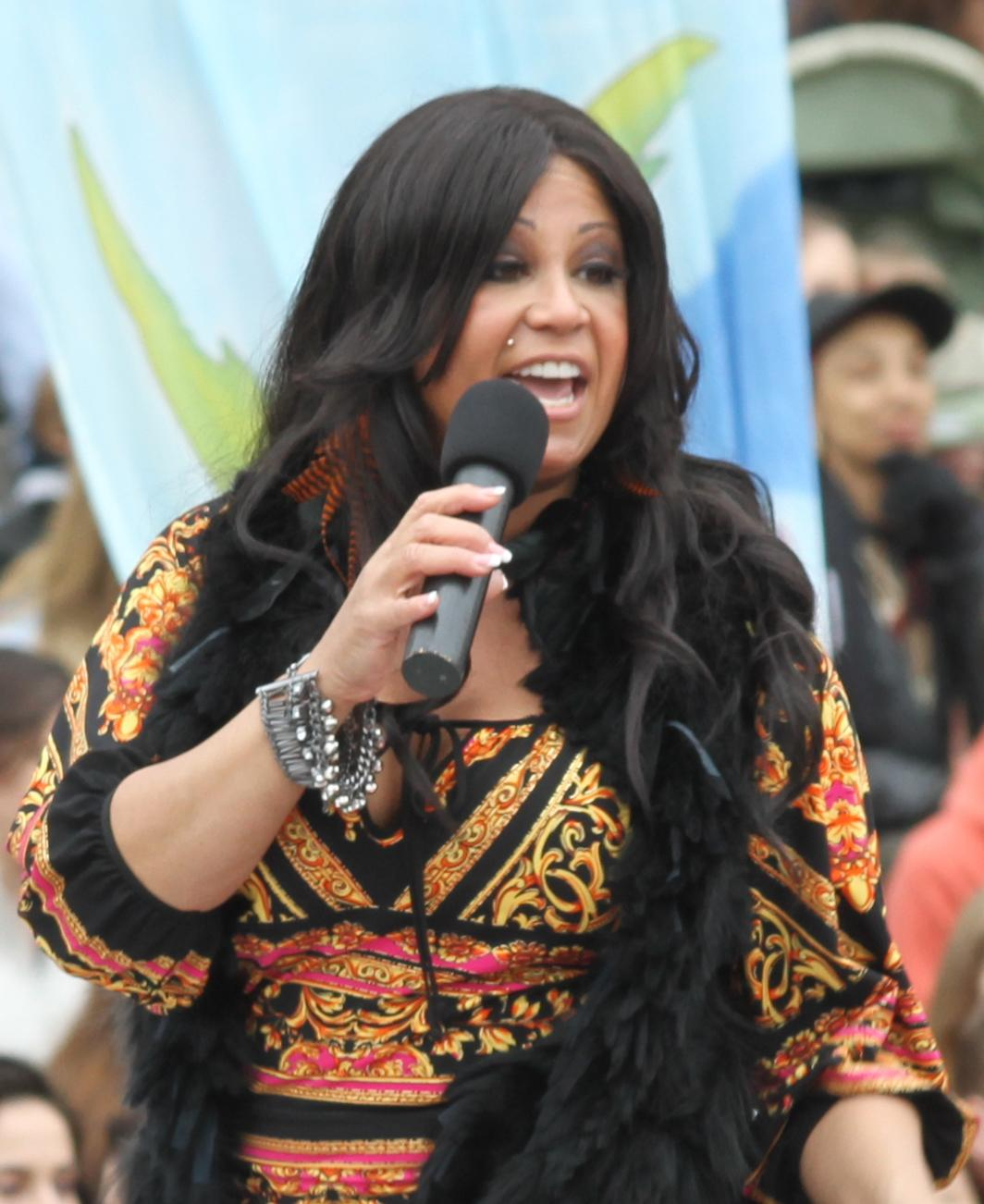
Peniston performing at the Cherry Blossom Parade in Washington, D.C., on April 9, 2011

"In Love with a DJ"

In June 2010, Hip-Hop Press posted information about Ron Carroll launching his own independent record label called Electricity, which is to be part of One Entertainment company that will specialize in marketing and promoting concerts, fashion shows and club events all over the world, and signing Electronic, Hip-Hop/R&B and gospel artists. According to the producer himself, Carroll's goal with the label (which has a major distribution deal with Universal) is to focus on artist development, music education and ensuring that Electricity creates a solid foundation for the music industry in Chicago. Following this announcement, a house/groove, "In Love with a DJ", with Peniston as its lead vocalist was released in July, including four remixes. In an interview for Great British Life, Carroll said that he "wanted to make a song that gives the perspective of a woman groovin' to my music, and loving me enough make her night complete."

==== "Make Me Say Oh", "Stoopid!" and "Celebrate" ====
On February 4, 2011, Peniston signed a recording contract with the independent label West Swagg Music Group (WWMG), established by Lupe Rose in 2010. The company currently has a deal with Bungalo Records, which is exclusively distributed by Universal Music Group Distribution. Peniston's first single on the label, "Stoopid!" was officially released on April 26 as a download single. One month prior to that, Peniston contributed to the March-issued various artists digital compilation titled Miami 2011 with "Make Me Say Oh", which is her fourth track recorded in collaboration with Ron Carroll (their previous works included songs "My Boo", "I'm Feelin' U" and "In Love with a DJ"). On August 9, WWMG released "Keep On Flossing" (a remixed version of her former single from the '90s) recorded as a duet with her fellow rapper Lavon Collins (aka L.C.) While on October 3, a new version of "Finally" by Paul Oakenfold followed. Another track called "Celebrate" was released on March 27.

== Personal life ==
In 1992, subsequent to the release of the debut album Finally, Peniston was briefly married to Malik Byrd, who co-wrote "Inside That I Cried" and appeared by her side also in its video. In 2003, Peniston married real estate professional Frank Martin from Halifax, Massachusetts. The couple divorced in 2011. On reality TV series Celebrity Wife Swap in August 2015, she dated personal trainer Marcus Matthews. This relationship ended soon after the series ended.

While Peniston's mother, Barbara Anne Quick Peniston was also her manager, one of Peniston's brothers, Gregory, now manages Cece. She previously had a financial struggle with a former account manager, Alvin Grubman, of Grubman and Associates of New York City. Grubman and Associates created a tax debt for Peniston.

=== Plastic surgery ===
With the exception of her formative years when she was crowned a beauty queen, Peniston was struggling with her weight constantly. "When I first got in this business, People were actually erupting in fits of laughter when I introduced myself, but I was comfortable with who I was, but that was an issue for the record company," she disclosed in 2006. "But see in this day and age where I'm at, it wouldn't be a problem for the record company, I'm going to make sure that it's not. But for somebody who's getting into the business, realize that you're a commodity, and if the record company's investing in you, make sure that you invest in yourself. Look is important because people see the physical first," she was advising up-comers in the 5 Magazine interview.

However, three years later, in November 2009, Peniston herself was spotted in Culver City, California posing for Inside Edition (produced daily at the CBS Broadcast Center in N.Y.C.), which first revealed details about her radical physical makeover and tumescent liposuction she, reportedly, got recommended by her new record executives. In addition, she was featured in several national celebrity news and fashion magazines, including the national Us Weekly, which tracked her progress as she sought to lose weight through plastic surgery. The surgery was a "hit" for Peniston, who then claimed to "feel great" after having liposuction, fat removed from her neck.

== Charity work ==
=== LOTS alias CeCe Peniston Youth Foundation ===
"Have a good foundation of people around you who will tell you the truth no matter what, continue to love what you do and be willing to grow and make changes within yourself. You should also have a good spiritual foundation, accept the good and the bad and analyze it. Once you know the peaks and valleys are going to be there, then you accept it a whole lot better."

— Peniston's thoughts on longevity for Exceptional Mag.

Originally in 1997, singer, along with her friend Heather, founded the CeCe Peniston Youth Foundation to help raise funds for many other organizations, particularly those concerned with HIV/AIDS, women and children in need, hunger and the equality of mankind. After the September 11 attacks, Michael Jackson requested her presence for his "United We Stand" concert to benefit the families of 9/11. She has also blazed two tracks ("The Christmas Song" and "What a Wonderful World) on the albums Merry Arizona II and Merry Arizona 97, with proceeds going to multiple sclerosis. She had been requested to perform for U.S. troops on the U.S.S. Dwight D. Eisenhower in 1993, and has continued to travel to entertain the U.S. troops overseas since.

Later in 2006, the foundation was to be re-named as the LOTS Foundation (Lifting Others To Succeed), after her statement in the interview for 5 Mag in June the same year, and she was planning doing a benefit for cancer research, because of her father, a cancer survivor.

=== National PTA Ambassador ===
In October 2008, singer was along with Dara Torres named a National Ambassador for the Parent Teacher Association, which is the largest volunteer child advocacy organization with more than 5 million members. In her new role, she visited with hundreds of children across the country to reinforce the importance of an arts education and pursuing their dreams. She also joined parents and educators to work toward improving the lives of children, as well as urging families to be more involved.
Following this announcement, Peniston started to record the official PTA anthem, "Above Horizons", which was released on the organization's recording label, National PTA Recordings in June 2009, as its first music release. The single was available in three different mixes ("Original Mix", "Status Mix" and "Aaron-Carl Mix") at PTAmusic.org, and its release coincided with PTA's unofficial announcement of Downloadfundraiser.com as a PTA National Member Benefits Provider, and the "category exclusive" digital music retailer for National PTA.

== Discography ==
Solo albums

- Finally (1992)
- Thought 'Ya Knew (1994)
- I'm Movin' On (1996)

Other studio albums

- Female Preacher with Overweight Pooch (1991)
- Good News in Hard Times with Sisters of Glory (1995)
- Desert Funk Soundtrack with VA (1998)
- Colour of My Soul with Full Flava (2003)
- Music Is Our Way of Life with Full Flava (2007)

== Filmography ==
Peniston has acted in theatrical productions such plays as The Wiz, Treat Her Like a Lady or When a Woman's Fed Up, and later also wrapped up shooting two independent films of the same genre (both released on Maverick Spirit in 2005). The first of them, Don't Touch If You Ain't Prayed, featured gospel music performed by Peniston herself, while the second, Pastor Jones, was another urban film appealing to the Christian market.

Year	Title	Role	Notes
2005	Pastor Jones	Cameo	DVD, directed by Jean-Claude La Marre
2005	Don't Touch If You Ain't Prayed	Pamela Matthews	DVD, directed by Larry "Flash" Jenkins
2014	Thorns from a Rose	Glendora Rose	Directed by Bryce Prevatte
2015	Where Is Good?	Detective Young	Inspired by true events, directed by Ricky Burchell

== See also ==
- List of awards and nominations received by CeCe Peniston
- List of artists who reached number one on the U.S. Dance Club Songs chart
