= Believe (Chaos song) =

Single by Chaos featuring CeCe Peniston
- B-side: "Remix"
- Released: September 29, 2015
- Length: 4:44 (original version)
- Label: Treehouse Tribe; Independent Artist (B2R Remix)
- Producer: Chaos

CeCe Peniston singles chronology
"Sick" (2014)	"Believe" (2015)	"The DJ Made Me Stay" (2015)

"Believe" is a 2015 song by Chaos featuring singer CeCe Peniston, released as a digital single on Treehouse Tribe Records on September 29, 2015.

== Track listing and format ==
MD, #TTREP006 • AAC • FLAC

1. "Believe" (Chaos Mix) – 4:44
2. "Believe" (Full Intention Vocal Mix) – 5:48
3. "Believe" (Man Without a Clue Mix) – 6:46
4. "Believe" (The Squatters Remix) – 5:31
5. "Believe" (Rich B & Phil Marriot Remix) – 7:19
6. "Believe" (Walter Suray Remix) – 3:41
7. "Believe" (Reload Remix) – 5:41

MD, #TTREP006

1. "Believe" (Full Intention Vocal Mix) – 5:48
2. "Believe" (Man Without a Clue Mix) – 6:46
3. "Believe" (The Squatters Remix) – 5:31
4. "Believe" (Chaos Mix) – 4:44
5. "Believe" (Rich B & Phil Marriot Remix) – 7:19
6. "Believe" (Walter Suray Remix) – 3:41
7. "Believe" (Reload Remix) – 5:41

MD (B2R Remix)

1. "Believe" (B2R Remix) – 5:48

CD-R

1. "Believe" (Chaos Original Radio Mix) – 3:30
2. "Believe" (Full Intention Radio Mix) – 3:58
3. "Believe" (Rich B & Phil Marriot Radio Mix) – 3:40

MD, #TTREP007

1. "Believe" (Tracy Young Ferosh Vocal Mix) – 5:46
2. "Believe" (Eddie Love Hate Remix) – 3:47
3. "Believe" (Dirty Pop Remix) – 6:50
4. "Believe" (Odd Motto Remix) – 6:46
5. "Believe" (Thee Filth Remix) – 5:16

== Credits and personnel ==
- Shawn Zilka (as Chaos) – performer, producer
- Michael Gray (as Full Intention) – remix
- Jon Pearn (as Full Intention) – remix
- Alexander Johannes Van Der Meijden (as Man Without a Clue) – remix
- Oliver Portamento (as The Squatters) – remix
- Alex Powell (as The Squatters) – remix
- Rich B – remix
- Phil Marriott – remix
- Walter Suray – remix
- Chris Frater (as Reload) – remix
- Ryan Stent (as Reload) – remix
- Patryk Martynus (as Martino) – remix
- Theresa Young (as )Tracy Young – remix
- Ed Kelly (as Eddie Love Hate) – remix
- Brian Cua (as Dirty Pop) – remix
- Drew G. Montalvo (as Dirty Pop) – remix
- Odd Motto – remix
- Rich Jones (as Thee Filth) – remix
- Label Engine – distribution
- Hart Media – distribution (CD-R)

== Charts ==
Chart (2015)	Peak position
UK Music Week Cool Cuts Chart	2
Chart (2016)
US Billboard Dance Club Songs	5
US Billboard Dance/Electronic Songs	30
