= Shame Shame Shame (Soulshaker and CeCe Peniston song) =

Single by Soulshaker and CeCe Peniston
- B-side: "Remix"
- Released: July 5, 2007
- Recorded: 2006
- Genre: House
- Length: 2:41 (Bass Monkeys Radio Mix)
- Label: Trackworks (US); AATW (UK)
- Songwriters: Matt Meyers; Warren Meyers; Kelly Mueller
- Producers: Matt Meyers; Warren Meyers; Kelly Mueller

CeCe Peniston singles chronology
"I'm Feelin' U" (2007)	"Shame Shame Shame" (2007)	"Still I" (2007)

"Shame Shame Shame" is a 2007 song by Soulshaker and CeCe Peniston. The single (written by Matt and Warren Meyers, along with Kelly Mueller) was released on Trackworks Records in the United States, while on the All Around the World label in England.

By 1997, "Shame Shame Shame" received several numbers ones within specialized DJ magazine charts (including the Music Week Pop Tip Chart, Music Week Club Chart, and DJ Mag Hype Chart).

In the international Global Dance Tracks chart compiled by U.S. Billboard the song peaked at number twenty-two on October 27, 2007.

== Track listings and formats ==
MD, US, #TWD 007

1. "Shame Shame Shame" (David Morales Radio Mix) – 3:35
2. "Shame Shame Shame" (David Morales Club Mix) – 8:29
3. "Shame Shame Shame" (David Morales Instrumental) – 8:29

MCD Maxi, US, Promo

1. "Shame Shame Shame" (Bass Monkeys Radio) – 2:41
2. "Shame Shame Shame" (Ray Roc & C. Rosillo Radio) – 3:39
3. "Shame Shame Shame" (Bass Monkey Club Mix) – 6:30
4. "Shame Shame Shame" (Ray Roc & C Rosillo Club Mix) – 7:02

MD, US, #TWD-004B

1. "Shame Shame Shame" (Ray Roc & C Rosillo Radio Mix) – 3:39
2. "Shame Shame Shame" (Speakerbox Radio Mix) – 3:32
3. "Shame Shame Shame" (Ray Roc & C Rosillo Club Mix) – 7:02
4. "Shame Shame Shame" (Ray Roc & C Rosillo Dubstr.) – 7:02
5. "Shame Shame Shame" (Ray Roc Vs Dj Denco Dub Edit) – 6:11
6. "Shame Shame Shame" (Speakerbox Vocal Club Mix) – 7:13
7. "Shame Shame Shame" (Speakerbox Vocal Dub Mix) – 6:40
8. "Shame Shame Shame" (Speakerbox Dubstrumental) – 6:23

MD, US, #TWD-004A

1. "Shame Shame Shame" (Bassmonkeys Radio Mix) – 2:41
2. "Shame Shame Shame" (Soulshaker 07 Radio Edit) – 3:24
3. "Shame Shame Shame" (Bass Monkeys Remix) – 6:28
4. "Shame Shame Shame" (Chris Bailey Remix) – 5:46
5. "Shame Shame Shame" (Sharp Boys Remix) – 8:02
6. "Shame Shame Shame" (Soulshaker 2007 Club Mix) – 7:27
7. "Shame Shame Shame" (Soulshaker Original Club Mix) – 7:47
8. "Shame Shame Shame" (Soulshaker Remix) – 6:39
9. "Shame Shame Shame" (Wally Montana Remix) – 7:21

MCD, UK, Promo, #CDDJGLOBE751

1. "Shame Shame Shame" (Bass Monkeys Remix) - 6:28
2. "Shame Shame Shame" (Soulshaker 2007 Club Mix) - 7:27
3. "Shame Shame Shame" (David Morales Remix) - 8:38
4. "Shame Shame Shame" (Mischa Daniels Remix) - 7:38
5. "Shame Shame Shame" (Smax & Gold Remix) - 7:30
6. "Shame Shame Shame" (Sharp Boys Remix) - 8:02
7. "Shame Shame Shame" (Chris Bailey Remix) - 5:46
8. "Shame Shame Shame" (Soulshaker Original Club Mix) - 7:47
9. "Shame Shame Shame" (David Morales Accapella Mix) - 7:04
10. "Shame Shame Shame" (Bass Monkeys Radio) - 2:41

MCD, US, Promo

1. "Shame Shame Shame" (Soulshaker Original Club Mix) – 7:47
2. "Shame Shame Shame" (Soulshaker 2007 Club Mix) – 7:27
3. "Shame Shame Shame" (Soulshaker Remix) – 6:39
4. "Shame Shame Shame" (Soulshaker Remix) – 6:39
5. "Shame Shame Shame" (Ray Roc & C Rosillo Club Mix) – 7:02
6. "Shame Shame Shame" (Ray Roc & C Rosillo Club Dub) – 7:01
7. "Shame Shame Shame" (Speakerbox Vocal Club Mix) – 7:13
8. "Shame Shame Shame" (Speakerbox Vocal Dub Mix) – 6:40
9. "Shame Shame Shame" (Chris Bailey Remix) – 5:46
10. "Shame Shame Shame" (Sharp Boys Remix) – 8:02
11. "Shame Shame Shame" (Wally Montana Remix) – 7:21

== Credits and personnel ==
- CeCe Peniston – lead vocal
- Matt Meyers – writer, producer
- Warren Meyers – writer, producer
- Kelly Mueller – writer, producer
- Bass Monkeys – remix
- David Morales – remix
- Mischa Daniels – remix
- Smax & Gold – remix
- Sharp Boys – remix
- Chris Bailey – remix
- Ramon Ray Checo – remix
- C. Rosillo – remix
- Speakerbox – remix
- Wally Montana – remix

== Charts ==
=== Weekly charts ===
Chart (2007)	Peak position
US Billboard Global Dance Tracks	22

=== Year-end charts ===
Chart (2007)	Position
US Top 100 Club Chart^{[A]}	85

Notes

- A The song shared the 85th position in the Club Year-End chart with Nelly Furtado's hit Maneater in common.

== See also ==
- Clubland 12
