= Lifetime to Love =

2000 single by CeCe Peniston

Single by CeCe Peniston
- B-side: "Remix"
- Released: January 9, 2001
- Recorded: 2000
- Genre: House
- Length: 3:45 (edited version)
- Label: 4 Play
- Songwriters: Steven Nikolas; Brendon Sibley
- Producers: Steven Nikolas; Brendon Sibley

CeCe Peniston singles chronology
"He Loves Me 2" (1999)	"Lifetime to Love" (2001)	"My Boo" (2001)

"Lifetime to Love" is a 2000 song by the musician CeCe Peniston. The title was originally recorded for a 4 Play Records compilation Circuit Sessions 00.1, which featured overall thirteen dance/house remixes by L.A. DJ Manny Lehman (including also for example Junior Vasquez's "Be Quiet", Pat Hodges' "Rushin to Meet You", Michelle Weeks' "Rejoice", or Trancesetters' "Roaches").

In January 2001, "Lifetime to Love" was released on single, returning the artist to the top positions of the US Billboard Hot Dance Music/Club Play chart, where the composition peaked at number two eventually, becoming the second most successful track taken from both compilations (after the US Dance No.1 single, "If It Don't Fit" by Abigail, respectively "Don't You Want My Love" by Debbie Jacobs-Rock, taken from the Vol. 2 compilation).

== Track listings and formats ==
12", US, #4P 2030-1

1. "Lifetime to Love" (Mr. Nice Guy 2 Step Mix) – 5:56
2. "Lifetime to Love" (Nic Torriero & Rob Milo Dub) – 7:42

12", US, #4P 2029-1

1. "Lifetime to Love" (Nikolas & Sibley Extended Mix) – 8:10
2. "Lifetime to Love" (Justin Time Dub) – 7:31
3. "Lifetime to Love" (Rosabel Attitude Vox) – 7:28
4. "Lifetime to Love" (Rosabel Data Flash Dub) – 7:58

12", US, TP, #4P 2029-1 & 4P 2030-1

1. "Lifetime to Love" (Mr. Nice Guy 2 Step Mix) – 5:56
2. "Lifetime to Love" (Nic Torriero & Rob Milo Dub) – 7:42
3. "Lifetime to Love" (Nikolas & Sibley Extended Mix) – 8:10
4. "Lifetime to Love" (Justin Time Dub) – 7:31
5. "Lifetime to Love" (Rosabel Attitude Vox) – 7:28
6. "Lifetime to Love" (Rosabel Data Flash Dub) – 7:58

MCD, CA & US, #FP 82029-2

1. "Lifetime to Love" (Radio Edit) – 3:45
2. "Lifetime to Love" (Nikolas & Sibley Extended Mix) – 8:10
3. "Lifetime to Love" (Rosabel Attitude Vox) – 7:28
4. "Lifetime to Love" (Rosabel Data Flash Dub) – 7:58
5. "Lifetime to Love" (Nic Torriero & Rob Milo Dub) – 7:42
6. "Lifetime to Love" (Justin Time Dub) – 7:31
7. "Lifetime to Love" (Mr. Nice Guy 2 Step Mix) – 5:56

== Credits and personnel ==
- CeCe Peniston – lead/back vocal
- Steven Nikolas – writer, mix, producer
- Brendon Sibley – writer, mix, producer
- Ralphi Rosario – remix, additional producer
- Abel Aguilera – remix, additional producer
- Nic Torriero – remix, additional producer
- Rob Milo – remix, additional producer
- DJ Justin Time – remix, additional producer
- Dave Audé – remix, additional producer
- Jeff Haddad – executive producer
- Randy Sills – executive producer
- David Brant CMYK – photography
- J.A.G. – graphic design
- EMI Music/Steven & Brendon Songs (ASCAP) – publisher

== Charts ==
=== Weekly charts ===
Chart (2001)	Peak position
US Dance Club Songs (Billboard)	2
US Dance Singles Sales (Billboard)	20
US Hot R&B/Hip-Hop Singles Sales (Billboard)	73

=== Year-end charts ===
Chart (2001)	Position
US Billboard Top Dance Music Club Play	30
