= Tumescent liposuction =

Method of administering local anesthesia to subcutaneous fat

Tumescent liposuction is a technique that provides local anesthesia to large volumes of subcutaneous fat and thus permits liposuction.

While the suctioned fat cells are permanently gone, after a few months overall body fat generally returned to the same level as before treatment. This is despite maintaining the previous diet and exercise regimen. While the fat returned somewhat to the treated area, most of the increased fat occurred in the abdominal area. Visceral fat - the fat surrounding the internal organs - increased, and this condition has been linked to life-shortening diseases such as diabetes, stroke, and heart attack. Edit per the cited journal, the difference in visceral fat between control and intervention group was not significant

== Technique ==
The tumescent technique for liposuction provides for local anesthesia via lidocaine, eliminating the need for the administration of sedatives or narcotics during surgery.

== Risks ==
A review published in 2011 stated tumescent liposuction was safe. During the first decade of the treatments use, deaths were reported with the treatment as the cause of death, dating back to 1999. By 2002, 23 deaths in five years had been reported in the European literature. Tierney et al (2011) said, "The most frequent complications were bacterial infections such as necrotizing fasciitis, gas gangrene, and different forms of sepsis. Further causes of lethal outcome were hemorrhages, perforation of abdominal viscera, and pulmonary embolism." Complications in this procedure are rare and typically minor. The most common include: skin irregularity, lumpiness, dimpling, loose skin, numbness, infections and scarring. However, these types of minor complications can easily be corrected in most cases.

In many U.S. states, physicians are not required to have training to perform this cosmetic surgery procedure.

== History ==
Jeffrey Klein and Patrick Lillis, dermatologic surgeons, invented the tumescent technique. The technique was developed in the 1980s, before it came to market in the 1990s. The technique was introduced to Australia in the early 1990s, with Daniel Lanzer named as one of the first to use the procedure in the country.

== See also ==
- Breast reduction plasty
