= Full Flava =

- Origin: Birmingham, England
- Years active: 2000–present
- Members: Rob Derbyshire; Paul "Solomon" Mullings; Tee
- Website: Full Flava

Full Flava are Rob Derbyshire and Paul Solomon, a Birmingham, England production team assisted by backing singer Tee, that specialize in producing R&B and soul records for many established artists such as Chantay Savage, Beverlei Brown, Ruby Turner, Carleen Anderson, Hazel Fernandes, Alison Limerick, CeCe Peniston, and Donna Gardier.

== Discography ==
=== Albums ===
Year	Title
2000	Chinese Whispers: Release date: 2000; Record label: Dôme Records; Format: CD
2003	Colour of My Soul: Release date: 2003; Record label: Dôme Records; Format: CD
2007	Music Is Our Way of Life: Release date: 2007; Record label: Dôme Records; Format: CD

=== Singles ===
Year	Title	Featured artist	Album
2000	"Chinese Whispers"	Ruby Turner	Chinese Whispers
2000	"Betcha Wouldn't Hurt Me"	Donna Gardier	Chinese Whispers
2003	"Stories"	Carleen Anderson	Colour of My Soul
2003	"Round & Round/Nature Boy"	Romina Johnson/Hazel Fernandes	Colour of My Soul
2003	"For My Baby"	CeCe Peniston	Colour of My Soul
2003	"Make It Right"	Donna Odain	Colour of My Soul
2004	"Make This a Special Night"	Lorraine McIntosh	non-album single
2006	"You Are the Universe"	CeCe Peniston	Music Is Our Way of Life
2006	"September"	Chantay Savage	Music Is Our Way of Life
2007	"I Specialize in Love"	Beverlei Brown	Music Is Our Way of Life
