= Nobody Else (CeCe Peniston song) =

Single by CeCe Peniston
- B-side: "Remix"
- Released: May 30, 1998
- Recorded: 1998
- Genre: House
- Length: 4:29 (edited version)
- Label: Silk
- Songwriters: CeCe Peniston; James Pullin; Steve Hurley
- Producer: Steve "Silk" Hurley

CeCe Peniston singles chronology
"I Know You Want Me" (1998)	"Nobody Else" (1998)	"He Loves Me 2" (1999)

"Nobody Else" is a song by American singer and songwriter CeCe Peniston. The composition, released in 1998, was to be the lead single of the singer's originally scheduled album release on the Silk Entertainment label, as well as reportedly released on Steve Hurley's compilation The Voices of Life, Vol. 1. The production of her album was cancelled eventually, and releasing of the compilation wouldn't happen either. However, the singer released another two singles on the label, "He Loves Me 2" the following year and "My Boo" in 2000.

The "Silk's House Revival" remix of the song granted Hurley, along with another five mixes made in favor of other artists, a Grammy Award-nomination for the Best Non-Classical Remixed Recording in 1999; lost to David Morales.

The song was also released on the various artist's compilation Hit Mania Dance Estate 1998, Vol. 2, which charted at number two on the Italian Albums Chart, and was listed as number forty-one in the year-end chart in Italy.

== Critical reception ==
Larry Flick from Billboard magazine wrote, "The belter who made multi-format noise a few years ago with hits like 'Finally' and 'We've Got a Love Thang' returns with a jam that revisits those tracks' house-inflected sound while also exploring raw gospel and old-school soul avenues. Peniston tears through this song with ferocious energy, while producer Steve "Silk" Hurley keeps the groove slick and accessible to both clubs and crossover radio formats. This single is sure to thrill die-hards who have been missing the singer's distinctive voice. It should also jump-start her career again quite nicely. Look for this single on Peniston's forthcoming album of the same name, as well as on Hurley's own imminent multi-artist album, Voices of Life."

== Track listings and formats ==
- 12", ES, Promo, #NM7086MX
1. "Nobody Else" (Silk's Filter Dub) – 5:06
2. "Nobody Else" (Silk's Spiritual Reprise) – 5:18
3. "Nobody Else" (Silk's Radio Edit) – 4:29
4. "Nobody Else" (Silk's House Revival Mix) – 13:35
- 12", FR, #FTR 4019-6
- 12", IT, #UMD 368
- 12", US, #SENT 9802-1
1. "Nobody Else" (Silk's House Revival Mix) – 13:35
2. "Nobody Else" (Silk's Filter Dub) – 5:06
3. "Nobody Else" (Silk's Spiritual Reprise) – 5:18
4. "Nobody Else" (Silk's Radio Edit) – 4:29
- 12", US, #SENT 9804 1
1. "Nobody Else" (Maurice's Funk-A-Mix) – 6:59
2. "Nobody Else" (Booker T's Dub) – 6:23
3. "Nobody Else" (E-Smoove's 12" Mix) – 7:39
4. "Nobody Else" (Booker T.´s 12" Mix) – 6:09
- MCD, ES, Promo, #NM7086CDMX
- MCD, FR, #FTR 4019-2
- MCD, US, #SENT 9802-2
- MCD, US, Promo, #SENT 9802 2
1. "Nobody Else" (Silk's Radio Edit) – 4:29
2. "Nobody Else" (Silk's House Revival Mix) – 13:35
3. "Nobody Else" (Silk's Filter Dub) – 5:06
4. "Nobody Else" (Silk's Spiritual Reprise) – 5:18

== Credits and personnel ==
- CeCe Peniston – lead vocal, writer
- Steve Hurley – writer, remix, arranger, producer, executive producer
- James Pullin – writer
- Maurice Joshua – remix
- Eric Miller (as E-Smoove) – remix
- Gary Booker (as Booker T) – remix
- Steve Johnson – assistant engineer
- Steve Weeder – mix engineer
- Hinge, Chicago – mix
- Microfoam S.L. – design
- Silktone Songs Inc. (ASCAP) – publisher

== Music awards and nominations ==
Grammy Awards

Year	Nominated artist	Nominated work	Award	Category	Result
1999	Steve "Silk" Hurley	"Nobody Else (Silk's House Revival)"	Grammy	Non-Classical Remixer of the Year	Nominated
