= West Side Stories =

Studio album by Jeff Lorber
- Released: November 8, 1994
- Recorded: 1994
- Studio: JHL Sound (Pacific Palisades, Los Angeles)
- Genre: Smooth jazz Jazz fusion
- Length: 49:53
- Label: Verve Forecast
- Producer: Jeff Lorber Marlon McClain Guy Eckstine

Jeff Lorber chronology
Worth Waiting For (1993)	West Side Stories (1994)	State of Grace (1994)

Professional ratings
Review scores
Source	Rating
Allmusic	2/5 stars

West Side Stories is the eleventh studio album by the six-time Grammy Award-nominated, one-time Grammy winning composer, keyboardist and pioneer of the smooth jazz genre, Jeff Lorber, released on Verve Forecast in 1994. After six previous nominations, Lorber won his first Grammy Award on January 28, 2018, for Best Contemporary Instrumental Album for Prototype by his band The Jeff Lorber Fusion.

The collection of eleven songs written mostly by Lorber himself included several featured artists. Among them, Eric Benét, Paulinho da Costa, Paul Jackson, Jr., Michael Landau, Hubert Laws, Kongar-ol Ondar, CeCe Peniston, Kongar-ol Ondar, Paul Pesco (guitarist on the Madonna's The Virgin Tour), or Art Porter, Jr.

The album scored in the U.S. Billboard Top Contemporary Jazz Albums chart at number five.

== Track listing ==
No.	Title	Writer(s)	Featured artist(s)	Length
1.	"Grasshopper"	Jeff Lorber		4:20
2.	"Point Venus"	Jeff Lorber		4:30
3.	"Iguassu Falls"	Jeff Lorber, Alec Milstein		5:17
4.	"Let the River Run"	Jeff Lorber		4:25
5.	"Say Love"	Jeff Lorber, Marlon McClain, Jeff Pescetto	Shades of Soul with Eric Benét	4:13
6.	"Road Song"	Jeff Lorber		4:13
7.	"No Regrets"	Jeff Lorber	Hubert Laws	5:13
8.	"Tour's End"	Jeff Lorber	Art Porter, Jr.	4:23
9.	"Tuva"	Jeff Lorber	Kongar-ol Ondar	5:00
10.	"Don't Forget the Love"	Jeff Lorber, Eric Benét	CeCe Peniston	4:35
11.	"Toad's Place"	Jeff Lorber	Art Porter, Jr.	3:44
Total length:				49:53

== Personnel ==
- Jeff Lorber – arrangements, acoustic piano (1, 2, 5, 6, 9, 10), synthesizers (1–4, 6, 8–11), Hammond B3 organ (1, 4, 10), Minimoog (1, 2, 5, 8), percussion (1, 8, 9), Steinway grand piano (3, 7), electric bass (3), Wurlitzer electric piano (4, 5), melody guitar (4, 8), wah wah guitar (6)
- Paul Jackson, Jr. – rhythm guitar (1, 2), electric guitar (6, 7)
- Michael Landau – guitar solo (1), rhythm guitar (2), electric guitar (3, 6, 7), nylon guitar (3)
- Marlon McClain – rhythm guitar (4, 8, 11), electric guitar (5), steel guitar (5)
- Paul Pesco – rhythm guitar (4), wah wah guitar (8), steel guitar (9)
- Oliver Leiber – rhythm guitar (10), Mu-tron (10)
- Nate Phillips – electric bass (1, 5, 8, 11)
- Alec Milstein – bass pops, synth bass (3), percussion (3), arrangements (3), electric bass (4, 6, 10)
- John Robinson – drums (1–7, 10), drum loop (6)
- Sergio Gonzales – drums (8, 9, 11)
- Paulinho da Costa – congas (2), shaker (2), castanets (2), percussion (3, 4, 7, 9, 11)
- Gary Meek – soprano saxophone (1, 2, 4, 6)
- Art Porter, Jr. – soprano saxophone (8, 11)
- Hubert Laws – flute (7)
- Eric Benét – lead vocals (5), backing vocals (10)
- Jeff Pescetto – backing vocals (5)
- Shades of Soul – backing vocals (5)
- Kongar-ol Ondar – throat singing (9)
- CeCe Peniston – lead vocals (10)

== Production ==
- Guy Eckstine – executive producer
- Jeff Lorber – producer, engineer
- Marlon McClain – producer (5)
- Eric Benét – assistant producer (10)
- David Frank – assistant producer (10)
- Jessica Lorber – associate producer, assistant engineer
- Alan Meyerson – mixing, live drums engineer
- Randi Bach, CPA – album coordination, business management
- Nate Herr – product manager
- Margery Greenspan – art direction
- Lili Picou – design
- Dennis Keeley – photography

== Charts ==
=== Weekly charts ===
Chart (1994)	Peak position
U.S. Billboard Top Contemporary Jazz Albums	5
