= Deeper Love =

Single by David Longoria featuring CeCe Peniston
- B-side: "Remix"
- Released: September 27, 2005
- Length: 5:01 (Ryan Humphries Chill Mix)
- Label: Del Oro
- Songwriter: David Longoria
- Producers: Longoria; Lucero; Reinhart

CeCe Peniston singles chronology
"Eternal Lover" (2004)	"Deeper Love" (2005)	"You Are the Universe" (2006)

"Deeper Love" is a song performed by David Longoria and CeCe Peniston, released on Del Oro Music in 2005.

The single release included eleven remixes in total (among others also from Junior Vasquez, Ryan Humphries, L.E.X., and Richard Earnshaw).

The song peaked at number fourteen on the US Hot Dance Music/Club Play on November 19, 2005, and remained on the chart for eleven weeks in total.

== Track listing and format ==
CDM, US, #DEL ORO 25078

1. "Deeper Love" (Junior Vasquez Club Mix) – 8:48
2. "Deeper Love" (L.E.X. Mambo Vocal Mix) – 8:50
3. "Deeper Love" (Groove Finders Mix) – 6:37
4. "Deeper Love" (Rasta Men Mix) – 6:14
5. "Deeper Love" (Ryan Humphries Club Mix) – 6:59
6. "Deeper Love" (d-Ion Espana Mix) – 6:09
7. "Deeper Love" (Ryan Humphries Chill Mix) – 5:01
8. "Deeper Love" (INTRAvenis Mix) – 6:03
9. "Deeper Love" (Ryan Humphries Industrial Mix) – 6:00
10. "Deeper Love" (Break-a-Leg Down Mix) – 6:52
11. "Deeper Love" (L.E.X. Mambo Dub Mix) – 9:03

== Credits and personnel ==
- David Longoria – writer, lead vocal, remix, producer
- CeCe Peniston – lead vocal
- Junior Vasquez – remix
- Robert Eibach – co-producer, engineer, remixer
- Mauro Lucero – co-producer, engineer
- Eddie X – remix
- Luigi Gonzales – remix
- Richard Earnshaw – remix
- The Original Tippa Lee – featured artist
- Andrew Wright – featured artist
- Ryan Humphries – remix, design
- Adam Reinhart – remix co-producer
- Eddie Rouse – photography

== Charts ==
Chart (2005)	Peak position
US Billboard Hot Dance Music Club Play	14
