= West Swagg Music Group =

- Founded: 2010
- Founder: Lupe Rose
- Distributor: Universal Music Group Distribution
- Genre: various
- Country of origin: United States
- Official website: westswagg.com

West Swagg Music Group is an American independent record label, established in 2010, that was located in the West Coast and designed to sign and distribute the music from West Coast Artists.

West Swagg Music Group currently has a label deal with Bungalo Records, with full distribution through Universal Music Group Distribution. Paul Ring, CEO of Bungalo/Universal Records, has formed a partnership with West Swagg Music Group.

== Artists ==
- CeCe Peniston

== See also ==
- List of record labels
