= George Jackson (music producer) =

DJ, remixer, and music producer (born 1969)

George Jackson (born April 24, 1969, in Chicago, Illinois, United States) is a DJ, remixer, and music producer who specializes in the dance music genre. After college and then a brief teaching stint, Jackson left the school system, and became the label head for Silk Entertainment (owned by Steve "Silk" Hurley). It was there that he learned the executive side of the business, as well. There was also a creative opportunity for Jackson, as he remixed Ann Nesby’s rendition of “Lovin’ Is Really My Game (George's Deep Lovin' Dub)”. He also assisted Hurley (as assistant engineer), on the remix of “Soul Shakedown” by Bob Marley, which was released on Koch Records (Canada) and Silk Entertainment, and then Grammy nominated for best remixed recording in 2002.

As one of the featured producers on the Chicago LP and DVD, Jackson joined forces with many other Chicago house music hit-makers (past and present) which formed one of the greatest house music collaborations of all-time. His production of “Another Day” (featuring Xaviera Gold) can be heard on the Chicago LP on S&S Records. Also, he remixed "Wastelands" by Hippie Torrales, George Mena and singer Robin Reed, which was released on Universe Media - UK.

Throughout the years as a DJ, Jackson has had residencies and regular guest spots in the Chicago area, at clubs such as Zentra Nightclub, The Prop House, and Red Dog. He has also DJed at Sidecar Cafe, Tom's Hidden Lounge, The Upstairs Lounge, and more. Outside of Chicago, George has premiered alongside CeCe Peniston and DJ Eddie X for Pride 2007 in Albuquerque, New Mexico. He has traveled overseas playing in Australia at Tankclub (Sydney, Australia) and Chevron Nightclub (Melbourne, Australia). He has also played in Sheffield, England as well.

== History ==
In 2002, Jackson teamed up with Markeydisko (Diskonauts), resulting in two productions, one being a house and jazz-infused tune entitled "Lost In Hyperspace" (Diskonauts). Their other production, "Call My Name" (Sharon Pass and Greg Gibbs ), was released on vinyl on Jackson's label, Ruff N' Tuff Records, and was eventually licensed to Mousse T's label, Peppermint Jam. It was then remixed by Richard Earnshaw, Shik Stylko, and Syke 'n' Sugarstarr, and appears on many compilations worldwide.

Jackson collaborated with UK house music producers Audiowhores (Graham Lord and Adam Unsworth) in 2003, which led to a trans-Atlantic co-production of a house tune called “Work It Out”, sung by recording artist RaShaan Houston and released on Peppermint Jam. Not long afterward, Jackson reunited with Houston and co-wrote the lyrics to “Happy”; which in turn, was a co-production with producer and entertainment attorney, Babatunde Williams. It was released on vinyl on an underground Chicago label, Bumpin' City Records. "Happy" caught the attention of legendary New Jersey DJ, Tony Humphries, who then featured "Happy" in his DJ mix on the Southport Weekender Vol. 4 double cd mix compilation.

Using the moniker DJ George J, in 2004, Jackson produced the UK dance anthem entitled “Never Gonna Let You Go”, sung by Chicago recording artist Cristina Sanchez (DJ George J. feat. Sevynn). Signed and released on Mel Medalie's UK-based label Champion Records, it soon climbed to number 6 on the UK Club Charts; and in 2005, it went into pop radio rotation on the UK radio shows of Pete Tong & Judge Jules.

In 2005, Jackson and Houston collaborated again, recording "Warrior" (RaShaan Houston/Ruff N' Tuff Records), which got remixes from Chicago house music Ron Carroll and Eric "E-Smoove" Miller. Houston, Jackson, and CeCe Peniston co-wrote "It's Alright" [(Redsoul & RaShaan Houston (Generate Music)].

In 2014, Jackson and childhood friend Evette Clark co-wrote the lyrics to "Love Don't Take Over". This time, Peniston delivered the vocals and once again, Markeydisko and George collaborated on the production. This time, they called themselves, "MG Select". The song caught the attention of Frankie Knuckles, and was then remixed by both Knuckles and Eric Kupper (collectively known as Director's Cut). As a digital release on Ruff N' Tuff, it took six days for the Director's Cut remix to reach number 1 on the Traxsource Soulful House Chart. Two days later, it reached number 1 on the Top 100 Singles chart. It also ranked number 102 on the Traxsource Top 200 Tracks and #45 on the Traxsource Top 200 Soulful House charts for 2014.
