= He Loves Me 2 =

Single by CeCe Peniston
- Released: October 1999
- Recorded: 1999
- Genre: House
- Length: 4:05 (edited version)
- Label: Silk
- Songwriters: Steve Hurley; Marc Williams; CeCe Peniston
- Producers: Steve "Silk" Hurley; Paul Johnson (remix)

CeCe Peniston singles chronology
"Nobody Else" (1998)	"He Loves Me 2" (1999)	"Lifetime to Love" (2000)

Music video
- "Live performance" on YouTube

"He Loves Me 2" is a 1999 song by the musician CeCe Peniston. This single was to be originally included on the singer's album, which was not released. A remix of the song, Paul Johnson's Dancefloor Dub, entered the Billboard Hot Dance Music/Club Play chart, where it peaked at number twenty-four in November 1999, after being classified number five as the Billboard Hot Dance Breakouts in the Club Play category.

As with the Peniston's previous single ("Nobody Else") recorded with Steve Hurley, the Silk's 12" Mix of the song brought the producer a Grammy Award nomination in 2000 as Remixer of the Year, Non-Classical.

The song was in addition included to Deeper Rhythms: The House Sessions, Vol 1, a compilation of club-oriented dance music exclusively featuring American artists, issued on Max Records, and became the most successful single taken from the album.

== Track listings and formats ==
12", FR, #FTR 4053 6

1. "He Loves Me 2" (Silk's 12" Mix) – 8:39
2. "He Loves Me 2" (Paul Johnson's Vocal Dub) – 8:44

12", US, #SENT 9903

1. "He Loves Me 2" (Silk's 12" Mix) – 8:39
2. "He Loves Me 2" (Silk's Tribal Reprise) – 3:10
3. "He Loves Me 2" (Paul Johnson's Vocal Dub) – 8:44
4. "He Loves Me 2" (Paul Johnson's Dancefloor Dub) – 7:04

12", US, #SENT 9903B-1

1. "He Loves Me 2" (Junior's Love 2 Club Mix) – 10:39
2. "He Loves Me 2" (Junior Loves 2 Beat the Drums)
3. "He Loves Me 2" (Junior's Loves 2 Club Mix Instrumental) – 10:39
4. "He Loves Me 2" (Junior Loves 2 Beat the Drums Again)

MCD, US, Promo

1. "He Loves Me 2" (Junior's Love 2 Club Mix) – 10:39
2. "He Loves Me 2" (Junior's Loves 2 Club Mix Instrumental) – 10:39
3. "He Loves Me 2" (Junior Loves 2 Beat the Drums)
4. "He Loves Me 2" (Junior Loves 2 Beat the Drums Again)
5. "He Loves Me 2" (Bonus – Silk's Acappella)

MCD, FR, #FTR 4053-2

1. "He Loves Me 2" (Silk's Radio Edit) – 4:05
2. "He Loves Me 2" (Roller Disco Edit) – 3:45
3. "He Loves Me 2" (Silk's 12" Mix) – 8:39
4. "He Loves Me 2" (Paul Johnson's Vocal Dub) – 8:44
5. "He Loves Me 2" (Paul Johnson's Dancefloor Dub) – 7:04
6. "He Loves Me 2" (Junior's Love 2 Club Mix) – 10:39
7. "He Loves Me 2" (Roller Discoclub Mix) – 6:45

VA Silk Entertainment Sampler • 12", US, #SENT 9901-1
— 3. "He Loves Me 2" (Original Demo)

== Credits and personnel ==
- CeCe Peniston – lead/backing vocals, writer
- Steve Hurley – writer, remix, arranger, producer
- Marc Williams (as M-Doc) – writer
- Paul Leighton Johnson – remix, additional producer
- Junior Vasquez – remix, additional producer
- Kazuhiko Gomi – programming
- Silktone Songs Inc. (ASCAP) – publisher
- InDaSoul Songs, Inc. (ASCAP) – publisher
- Didier – mastering at Top Master

== Charts ==
Chart (1999)	Peak position
US Dance Club Songs (Billboard)	24

== Awards and nominations ==
Grammy Awards

Year	Nominated artist	Nominated work	Award	Category	Result
2000	Steve "Silk" Hurley	"He Loves Me 2 (Silk's 12" Mix)"	Grammy	Non-Classical Remixer of the Year	Nominated
