= United Cerebral Palsy =

US-based nonprofit organization

- Type: Non-Profit
- Founded: 1949
- Founder: Leonard and Isabel Goldenson, Jack and Ethel Hausman
- Headquarters: 1825 K Street, NW, Suite 600; Washington, DC 20006
- Key people: Armando A. Contreras (President and CEO); Diane Wilush (Chair of the Board of Trustees)
- Website: ucp.org

United Cerebral Palsy (UCP) is an international nonprofit charitable organization consisting of a network of affiliates. UCP is a leading service provider and advocate for adults and children with disabilities. As one of the largest health nonprofits in the United States, the UCP mission is to advance the independence, productivity and full citizenship of people with disabilities through an affiliate network.

== History ==
United Cerebral Palsy was founded in 1949 by Leonard Goldenson (who later became Chairman of the broadcast network ABC) and his wife Isabel, and Jack and Ethel Hausman. United Cerebral Palsy pioneered the use of fundraising telethons.

== Service provider ==
UCP, through its more than 66 local affiliates across the United States, as well as in Canada and Australia, provide a broad array of services and resources to children and adults with a broad range of disabilities. Each affiliate provides a different menu of services tailored to their local needs and capabilities, but often include education, employment, health & wellness, housing, parenting & family training and support, sports & leisure, transportation, and travel assistance. UCP has a combined budget of more than $750 million for research, public policy advocacy and direct services. System-wide, an average of 85 percent of all revenue is dedicated to programs.

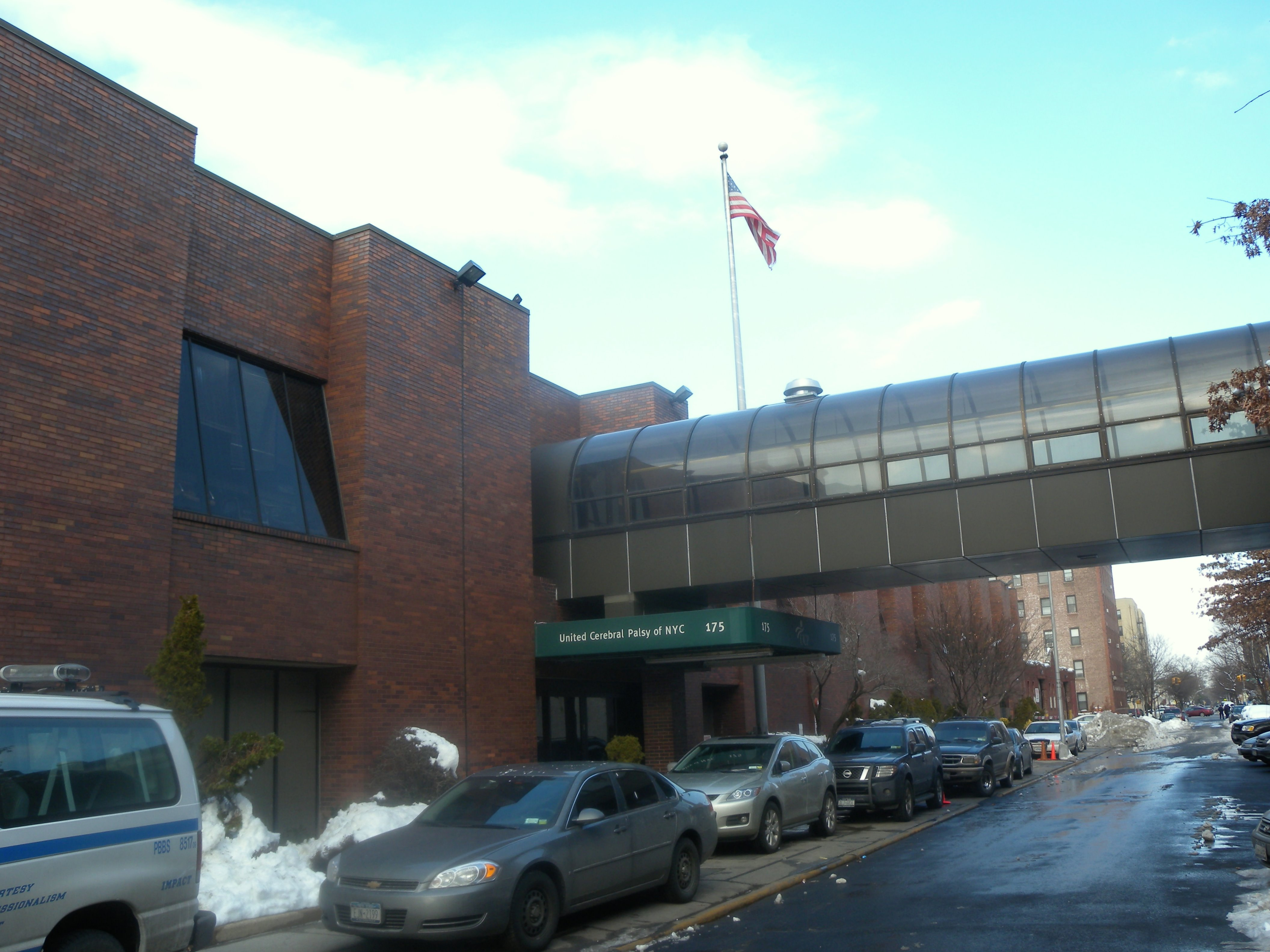
UCP of New York City

== Advocacy ==
In addition to raising money for services and research, UCP also engages in public policy advocacy, including promoting access and opportunity for people with disabilities, and the provision of services. In the United States, UCP was one of the catalyst organizations advocating for the adoption of the Americans With Disabilities Act in 1990.

== Calls for name change ==
In April 2013, United Cerebral Palsy of Central Maryland announced that it would change its name from UCP to Unified Community Connections to make it clearer which clientele is served by the organization. Other affiliates have chosen not to include the phrase "United Cerebral Palsy," as part of their doing business as names or logos even if it might remain part of their legal names, in an effort to be more encompassing of their programs and services.

In 2013, the United Cerebral Palsy of Greater Chicago merged with Seguin Services and has since been called UCP Seguin of Greater Chicago.

== Leadership ==
UCP is led by a 16-person board of trustees and president and CEO Armando A. Contreras. The headquarters is in Washington, D.C.

=== Accreditation ===
UCP meets the standards of the National Health Council and the Better Business Bureau/Wise Giving Alliance.
