= Inside That I Cried =

1992 single by CeCe Peniston

Single by CeCe Peniston

from the album Finally
- B-side: "Hitmix"
- Released: September 11, 1992
- Genre: R&B; soul
- Length: 5:51 (album version)
- Label: A&M
- Songwriters: Rodney K. Jackson; Malik Byrd; Otto D'Agnolo
- Producer: Steve Lindsey

CeCe Peniston singles chronology
"Crazy Love" (1992)	"Inside That I Cried" (1992)	"I'm in the Mood" (1993)

Music video
- "Inside That I Cried" on YouTube

"Inside That I Cried" is a song by American singer-songwriter CeCe Peniston, released in September 1992 by A&M Records as the fifth and last single from her debut album, Finally (1992). The single release includes "Hitmix", a medley of her songs "Finally", "We Got a Love Thang", "Keep On Walkin'", "Lifeline" and "It Should Have Been You", all taken from the album. "Inside That I Cried" reached the top 10 of the American Billboard Hot R&B Singles & Tracks chart and peaked at number 94 on the US Billboard Hot 100. In the United Kingdom, the song reached number 42 on the UK Singles Chart.

== Critical reception ==
Craig Lytle from AllMusic stated that here, Peniston "tenderly caresses the grieving lyric of the percolating ballad". Larry Flick from Billboard magazine wrote, "After a trio of kinetic club-friendly dance hits, A&M wisely brings forth a mournful, '70s-styled soul ballad that confirms what a growing legion of programmers and consumers already know: Peniston has the voice and charisma to establish a lengthy career as a pop diva." Another Billboard editor described the song as a "pensive R&B ballad". John Martinucci from the Gavin Report commented, "Ce Ce slows everything down on her fourth release for urban radio. By eliminating the sometimes distracting high energy production, Ce Ce's beautiful voice gets an opportunity to be showcased on this slow jam."

== Track listings and formats ==
- 7-inch, Jamaica
1. "Inside That I Cried" (LP version) – 5:50
2. "Inside That I Cried" (edit) – 4:46
- Cassette, US, #AM 0059/31458 0059
1. "Inside That I Cried" (edit) – 4:46
2. "Inside That I Cried" (LP version) – 5:50
- 7-inch, UK, #AM0121/580121-7
- CS, UK, #AMMC 0121/580121-4
1. "Inside That I Cried" (radio mix) – 3:49
2. "Hitmix" (7") – 3:56
- 12-inch, UK, #AMY 0121/580 121-1
1. "Inside That I Cried" (radio mix) – 3:49
2. "It Should Have Been You" (LP version) – 5:51
3. "Hitmix" (12") – 11:29
- MCD, UK, #AMCD 0121
1. "Inside That I Cried" (radio mix) – 3:49
2. "Hitmix" (7") – 3:56
3. "It Should Have Been You" (LP version) – 5:51
4. "Hitmix" (12") – 11:29

== Credits and personnel ==
Management

- Executive producers – Manny Lehman, Mark Mazzetti
- Recording studios – Village Recorders, Los Angeles, California; The House of Soul, Brooklyn, New York; Encore Recording Studios, Burbank, California (mix)
- Publishing – Urban Tracks Music, Mainlot Music, Donyolo Music (BMI)

Production

- Writers – Rodney Jackson, Malik Byrd, Otto D'Agnolo
- Producer, arrangement and musical instruments – Steve Lindsey (moog bass, vibes, Wurlitzer)
- Mixing – Elliot Peters
- Engineering – David Schoeber, Richard Cottrell, Doug de Forest, Robert Paustian (vocals)

Personnel

- Lead vocals – Cecilia Peniston
- Backing vocals – Anthony Warren, Phillis Williams, Jacquelyn Gouche-Farris
- Piano – Robert Buchanan (electric)
- Guitars – Charles Fearing (electric), Dean Parks (acoustic)
- Drums – Edward Greene
- Saxophone – Brandon Fields
- Percussion – Leonard Castro
- Synthesizers – Khris Kellow, John Joseph Barnes (French horn), Buchanan (ARP String Ensemble)

== Charts ==
Chart (1992)	Peak position
UK Singles (OCC)	42
UK Dance (Music Week)	23
UK Club Chart (Music Week)	23
US Billboard Hot 100	94
US Hot R&B/Hip-Hop Songs (Billboard)	10
US Cash Box Top 100	90

== Release history ==
Region	Date	Format(s)	Label(s)	Ref.
United States	September 11, 1992	Cassette	A&M	
United Kingdom	November 30, 1992	7-inch vinyl; 12-inch vinyl; CD; cassette	A&M	

== "Hitmix" ==
"Hitmix"

Promotional single by CeCe Peniston
- A-side: "It Should Have Been You"; "Inside That I Cried"
- Length: 11:29 (12-inch version)
- Label: A&M PM
- Songwriters: Delgado; Linnear; Peniston; Miller; McAllister; Savage; Hurley; Williams; Russell; Lyter; O'Hara; Rich; Thompson
- Producers: Delgado; Hurley; Morales; Jackson

=== Credits ===
Management

- Recording studios – Aztec Studios, Phoenix; Chaton Recordings, Scottsdale, Arizona; Tanglewood Studios, Chicago, Illinois; Axis Studios, Electric Lady Studios (mixing), New York City, New York
- Publishing – Wax Museum Music, Mainlot Music, George You've Got It Music, O'Hara Music, MCA, Island Music (BMI); Last Song, Mushroom Music (AU); IDG (ASCAP)
- Administration – Third Coast Music (ASCAP)

Production

- Writers – Peniston, Felipe Delgado, Elbert Lee Linnear, Eric Miller, Jeremiah McAllister, Chantay Savage (as Chanté), Steven Hurley, Marc Williams, Kimberly Russell (as Kym Sims), George Lyter, Michael Judson O'Hara, Denise Eisenberg Rich, Darryl Thompson
- Producers – Delgado, Jackson, Hurley (as "Silk"), David Morales
- Mixing – Hurley, Morales, Gail King (as "Sky")
- Arrangement – Hurley, Danny Madden (vocals)
- Remixing – Morales, Hurley
- Engineering – David Sussman, Larry Sturm, John Poppo, Hurley (remix)

Personnel

- Vocals – Peniston
- Backing vocals – Savage, Russell, Donell Rush (as Darnnel)
- Percussion – Morales, Bashiri Johnson
- Piano – Eric Kupper (acoustic and solo)
- Keyboards – Hurley, Peter Schwartz (as "Ski"), Terrance Burrus, Jackson
- Drums programming – Schwartz, Delgado, Jackson
