= Hit by Love =

1994 single by CeCe Peniston

Single by CeCe Peniston

from the album Thought 'Ya Knew
- B-side: "Keep Givin' Me Your Love"; "Through Those Doors"; "I'm Not Over You"
- Released: July 25, 1994
- Genre: House-pop; disco; garage
- Length: 4:34 (album version)
- Label: A&M
- Songwriters: Steven Nikolas; Brendon Sibley; Carsten Schack; Kenneth Karlin; Cutfather
- Producers: Soulshock and Karlin; David Morales (remix)

CeCe Peniston singles chronology
"I'm Not Over You" (1994)	"Hit by Love" (1994)	"Movin' On" (1996)

Music video
- "EU version" on YouTube "US version" on YouTube

"Hit by Love" is a song by American singer-songwriter CeCe Peniston, released in July 1994 by A&M Records as the fourth single from her second album, Thought 'Ya Knew (1994). The song was written by Steven Nikolas, Brendon Sibley, Carsten Schack, Kenneth Karlin and Cutfather, and produced by Schack and Karlin. It became Peniston's fifth number-one hit on the US Billboard Dance Club Play chart. Issued in Europe with "I'm Not Over You" on B-side, it peaked at number 33 on the UK Singles Chart and number 90 on the Billboard Hot 100.

== Critical reception ==
Jose F. Promis from AllMusic noted that "Hit by Love" was closer in spirit to her early dance hits, but by that time the steam had worn off and the song didn't become a hit. Larry Flick from Billboard magazine named it her best single since "Finally" in 1991. He explained, "Surrounded by jumpy pop/house beats and sweet, disco-leaning synths, she has a field day with the song's giddy romantic tone and instantly memorable chorus. Will shine a warm, refreshing light on any station it graces, while loyal club fans will bathe in hard-hitting remixes by Junior Vasquez and David Morales."

Annette M. Lai from the Gavin Report named the "pop-infused" song one of the "outstanding tracks" of the Thought 'Ya Knew album, adding it as "the track I listen to over and over". People Magazine described it as "jumping". Tim Jeffery from Music Week's RM Dance Update opined that it is "not as catchy" as previous Peniston hits. Another RM editor, James Hamilton, named it a "catchy garage strider" in his weekly dance column.

== Track listings and formats ==
- Mini-CD, Japan, #PODM-1041
1. "Hit by Love" (LP Version) – 4:36
2. "Hit by Love" (Classic Radio Mix) – 3:52
- CD, Netherlands, #580 758-2
1. "Hit by Love" (Radio Mix) – 3:25
2. "I'm Not Over You" (Hip Hop Mix) – 4:35
- Cassette, UK, #580 692-4
1. "Hit by Love" (Radio Mix) – 3:25
2. "I'm Not Over You" (Hip Hop Mix) – 4:35
3. "Through Those Doors" (Alternative Mix) – 4:35
- 12-inch, Europe, #580 693-1
- 12-inch, UK, #AMY 693
1. "Hit by Love" (Def Classic Mix) – 8:16
2. "Hit by Love" (LP Version) – 4:36
3. "Hit by Love" (Classic Dub) – 5:40
4. "Hit by Love" (Def Dub) – 7:25
- Cassette, US, #31458 0768 4
1. "Hit by Love" (LP Version) – 4:36
2. "Hit by Love" (Classic Radio Mix) – 3:52
3. "Hit by Love" (Alternate Radio Mix) – 4:30
4. "Hit by Love" (Down Tempo Swing Mix) – 4:01
- Maxi-CD, Europe, #580 759-2
1. "Hit by Love" (Radio Mix) – 3:25
2. "Hit by Love" (Classic Radio Mix) – 3:52
3. "Hit by Love" (Def Classic Mix) – 8:16
4. "Hit by Love" (The Body) – 6:55
- Maxi-CD, US, #31458 0769 2
1. "Hit by Love" (Classic Radio Mix) – 3:52
2. "Hit by Love" (Alternate 7" Mix) – 4:33
3. "Hit by Love" (D-Max Dub) – 6:45
4. "Hit by Love" (LP Edit) – 4:10
5. "Keep Givin' Me Your Love" (West End Remix) – 5:56
- 12-inch, US, #31458 0765 1
1. "Hit by Love" (Alternate 12" Mix) – 7:40
2. "Hit by Love" (D-Max Dub) – 6:45
3. "Hit by Love" (Classic Dub) – 5:40
4. "Hit by Love" (Def Classic Mix) – 8:16
5. "Hit by Love" (Def Dub) – 7:25
6. "Hit by Love" (LP Version) – 4:36
- Maxi-CD, UK, #AMCD 693
- CD, UK, #580 693-2
1. "Hit by Love" (Radio Mix) – 3:25
2. "Hit by Love" (Classic Radio Mix) – 3:52
3. "Hit by Love" (Def Classic Mix) – 8:16
4. "Hit by Love" (The Body) – 6:55
5. "Hit by Love" (Def Dub) – 7:25
6. "Hit by Love" (Classic Dub) – 5:40
- 12-inch double A-side, Europe, #580 723-1
- 12-inch double A-side, UK, #AMY 723/580 723-1
1. "Hit by Love" (The Body) – 6:55
2. "I'm Not Over You" (Jamie's Under the Swing Mix) – 6:56
3. "I'm Not Over You" (Junior's Factory Mix) – 9:30

== Credits and personnel ==
- CeCe Peniston – lead/back vocal, executive producer
- Steven Nikolas – writer, vocal arrangement
- Brendon Sibley – writer, vocal arrangement
- Carsten Schack – writer, producer, mix
- Kenneth Karlin – writer, producer, mix
- Cutfather – writer
- David Morales – remix, additional producer
- Mads Nilson – mix
- Doug Michael – engineer
- David Sussman – engineer
- Manny Lehman – executive producer
- Damon Jones – executive producer
- David Collins – mastering
- Patricia Sullivan – mastering
- Studio 56 – studio
- Medley Studio, Copenhagen – mix
- A&M Mastering Studios – mastering
- Steven and Brendon Songs/Casadida Publishing (ASCAP) – publisher
- EMI Virgin Music – admin, publisher

== Charts ==
=== Weekly charts ===
Chart (1994)	Peak position
UK Singles (OCC)	33
UK Dance (OCC)	5
UK Dance (Music Week)	5
UK Club Chart (Music Week)	12
US Billboard Hot 100	90
US Dance Club Songs (Billboard)	1
US Dance Singles Sales (Billboard)	17
US Hot R&B/Hip-Hop Songs (Billboard)	47
US Cash Box Top 100	78

=== Year-end charts ===
Chart (1994)	Position
US Dance Club Play (Billboard)	24

== See also ==
- List of number-one dance singles of 1994 (U.S.)
