= Keep On Walkin' (song) =

1992 single by CeCe Peniston

Single by CeCe Peniston

from the album Finally
- B-side: "Medley"
- Released: May 5, 1992
- Genre: R&B; new jack swing; funk
- Length: 4:30 (album version)
- Label: A&M
- Songwriters: Steve "Silk" Hurley; Marc Williams; Kym Sims
- Producer: Steve "Silk" Hurley

CeCe Peniston singles chronology
"We Got a Love Thang" (1992)	"Keep On Walkin'" (1992)	"Crazy Love" (1992)

Music video
- "Keep On Walkin'" on YouTube

"Keep On Walkin'" is a song by American musician CeCe Peniston, recorded for her debut album, Finally (1992), on A&M Records. Written by Steve Hurley, Marc Williams and Kym Sims, it was released in May 1992 as the singer's third single from the album and was her third number one on the US Billboard Hot Dance Music/Club Play chart. The single additionally peaked at number three on the US R&B chart, number 15 on the Hot 100, and number 10 in the United Kingdom. Hurley was awarded an ASCAP Writer's Award for the song, with "I'm Not Over You" and "Too Blind to See It" by Kym Sims. The accompanying music video received an nomination at the 1992 Billboard Music Video Award.

"Special Extended" remix version of the track was later issued on "I'm in the Mood" single release.

== Critical reception ==
Craig Lytle from AllMusic stated that the song "has a swingin' hip-hop edge with house music flair." J.D. Considine from The Baltimore Sun remarked the "Teena Marie-style delivery" that Peniston lends "Keep On Walkin'". Larry Flick from Billboard magazine wrote, "Though 'We Got a Love Thang' fell somewhat short of A&M's pop expectations, this easy-going jack/funk affair from Peniston's excellent debut album, Finally, proves that the game is far from over." He added, "She delivers an assertive vocal that recalls early Teena Marie, while producer Steve "Silk" Hurley tempers the beats with a memorable melody and a fluid sax solo. Way cool for several formats." Clark and DeVaney from Cashbox felt that the production "is very catchy and sets another pattern for a song that can be classified as pop, dance and R&B. Her vocals are very clear and smooth, matching up with the music perfectly."

Pan-European magazine Music & Media noted that after the "demanding dance beats" of her breakthrough hit, "the pace slows down a bit." They added, "In comparison the composition may be a bit weak, but her tremendous vocals carry it across." Andy Beevers from Music Week commented, "Although not as impressive as 'Finally' or 'Love Thang', this soulful track should still score that all important third hit for Ce Ce." James Hamilton from the Record Mirror Dance Update described it as a "soulfully wailed jaunty jiggler". Bunny Sawyer from Smash Hits wrote, "Though nothing can ever top the complete fabulousness that was 'Finally', there's a funny squibbly noise in this that raises it above your normal house stomper. Summery and well-behaved, it coaxes you into your dancing slippers rather than walloping you round the head with them." Charles Aaron from Spin said that the singer and producer "revived R&B lickety-split with this undeniable strut."

== Music awards and nominations ==
ASCAP Awards

Year	Nominated artist	Award	Result
1992	Steve "Silk" Hurley	ASCAP Writer's Award	Won

Billboard Music Video Awards

Year	Award	Category	Result
1992	Billboard Music Video Award	Best Female Artist - R&B/Rap	Nominated

== Track listings and formats ==
- 7", UK, #AM 878<
- 7", FR, #AM878
1. "Keep On Walkin'" (LP Version) - 4:30
2. "Keep On Walkin'" (Silky Soul 7") - 4:09
- 7", EU & UK, #AM 878/390878-7
- CD, FR, 390 889 2
1. "Keep On Walkin'" (7" Version) - 3:43
2. "Keep On Walkin'" (Silky Soul 7") - 4:09
- CS, UK, #AMMC 878
1. "Keep On Walkin'" (LP Edit) - 3:58
2. "Keep On Walkin'" (Silky Soul 7") - 4:09
- CD, AU, #580 006-2
1. "Keep On Walkin'" (LP Edit) - 3:58
2. "Keep On Walkin'" (Silky Soul 7") - 4:09
3. "Medley" ("Finally"/"We Got a Love Thang") - 3:09
- CS, US, #75021 1598 4
1. "Keep On Walkin'" (LP Edit) - 3:58
2. "Keep On Walkin'" (Silky Soul 7") - 4:09
3. "Keep On Walkin'" (Hard Urban 7") - 4:25
4. "Medley" ("Finally"/"We Got a Love Thang") - 3:09
- 12", US, #75021 7282 1
1. "Keep On Walkin'" (Silky Soul 12") - 6:25
2. "Keep On Walkin'" (LP Version) - 4:30
3. "Keep On Walkin'" (Silky Soul Dub) - 5:51
4. "Keep On Walkin'" (Maurice's Underground Vox) - 6:05
5. "Keep On Walkin'" (E-Smoove Groovy Mix) - 6:15
- 12", NL, #390 878 1
- 12", UK, #AMY878
- 12", UK, #AMY 878/390 878-1
1. "Keep On Walkin'" (12" Original Mix) - 5:04
2. "Keep On Walkin'" (Silky Soul 12") - 6:25
3. "Keep On Walkin'" (Silky Soul Dub) - 5:51
4. "Keep On Walkin'" (Maurice's Underground Vox) - 6:05
5. "Keep On Walkin'" (Maurice's Underground Dub) - 6:25
6. "Keep On Walkin'" (E-Smoove Groovy Mix) - 6:15
- 12", US, #75021 2399 1
1. "Keep On Walkin'" (Silky Soul 12") - 6:25
2. "Keep On Walkin'" (Maurice's Underground Vox) - 6:05
3. "Keep On Walkin'" (E-Smoove Groovy Mix) - 6:15
4. "Keep On Walkin'" (Hard Urban 12" Mix without Rap) - 5:52
5. "Keep On Walkin'" (12" Original Mix) - 5:04
6. "Keep On Walkin'" (LP Edit) - 3:58
- MCD, EU & UK, #AMCD 878/390878-2
1. "Keep On Walkin'" (7" Version) - 3:43
2. "Keep On Walkin'" (12" Original Mix) - 5:04
3. "Keep On Walkin'" (Silky Soul 7") - 4:09
4. "Keep On Walkin'" (Silky Soul 12") - 6:26
5. "Keep On Walkin'" (Maurice's Underground Vox) - 6:05
6. "Keep On Walkin'" (Silky Soul Dub) - 5:52

== Credits and personnel ==
Management

- Executive producers – Manny Lehman, Mark Mazzetti
- Recording studios – Tanglewood Studios, Chicago, Illinois; Spike Records and Soundtrack Recording, New York City, New York (remix)
- Publishing – Last Song, Mushroom Music (AU)
- Administration – Third Coast Music (ASCAP)

Production

- Writers – Steve "Silk" Hurley, Kym Sims, Marc Williams, Linque Ayoung (lyrical flavors; remix)
- Producers – Steve "Silk" Hurley; Maurice Joshua, Ike Lee and Aaron Lyles (as "Freedom") (remix)
- Mixing – Hurley
- Remixing – Hurley, Joshua, Lee and Lyles
- Engineering – Larry Sturm; Hurley, Eric Butler and Gregg Mann (remix), Bruce Moore (assistant; remix)

Personnel

- Vocals – Cecilia Peniston
- Backing vocals – Donell Rush (as Darnnel), Chantay Savage (as Chanté)
- Keyboards – Hurley (remix)
- Programming – Lee and Robert Douglas (as Bobby "d") (keyboards; remix)
- Cover art – Simon Fowler

== Charts ==
=== Weekly charts ===
Chart (1992)	Peak position
Australia (ARIA)	123
Belgium (Ultratop Flanders)	31
Belgium (VRT Top 30)	30
Canada Top Singles (RPM)	67
Canada Dance/Urban (RPM)	1
Europe (European Dance Radio)	7
Ireland (IRMA)	17
Netherlands (Dutch Top 40)	44
Netherlands (Single Top 100)	41
UK Singles (OCC)	10
UK Airplay (Music Week)	17
UK Dance (Music Week)	2
UK Club Chart (Music Week)	1
US Billboard Hot 100	15
US Dance Club Songs (Billboard)	1
US Dance Singles Sales (Billboard)	6
US Hot R&B/Hip-Hop Songs (Billboard)	3
US Rhythmic Airplay Chart (Billboard)	19
US Cash Box Top 100	12

=== Year-end charts ===
Chart (1992)	Position
American Top 40	46
UK Top Singles (Music Week)	121
UK Club Chart (Music Week)	23
US Top Pop Singles (Billboard)	61
US Top Dance Music Club Play (Billboard)	32
US Top R&B Singles (Billboard)	37
US Cash Box Top 100	100

== Release history ==
Region	Date	Format(s)	Label(s)	Ref.
United States	May 5, 1992	12-inch vinyl; cassette	A&M	
United Kingdom	May 11, 1992	7-inch vinyl; 12-inch vinyl; CD; cassette	A&M	

== Reissues ==
"Keep On Flossing"

Single by L.C and CeCe Peniston
- Released: August 9, 2011
- Recorded: 2011
- Genre: Hip hop; dance
- Length: 3:26 (Radio version)
- Label: West Swagg; Bungalo (UMGD)
- Songwriters: Hurley, Williams, Russell
- Producer: Remix: Ramos

=== "Keep On Flossing" ===
On August 9, 2011, Peniston released a re-recorded version of the song "Keep On Flossing", as a duet with fellow West Swagg Music Group rapper Lavon Collins self-called as L.C. (The One).

==== Track listings ====
MD, US, #(–)

1. "Keep On Flossing" (Radio Version) - 3:26

==== Additional credits ====
Production

- Producer – Duane Ramos (as DaRock)
- Remix - Mitch Waddell

Personnel

- Lead vocals – Lavon Collins (as L.C) (rapping)
- Backing vocals – Cecilia Peniston

== See also ==
- List of number-one dance singles of 1992 (U.S.)
