= Thought 'Ya Knew =

Studio album by CeCe Peniston
- Released: January 11, 1994
- Recorded: 1993
- Genres: Dance; R&B
- Length: 72:17
- Label: A&M
- Producers: Steve "Silk" Hurley; Soulshock & Karlin; Sir Jinx; Mark Dubuclet; Andres Levin & Camus Maré Celli; David Morales; Brian McKnight; Richard Wolf

CeCe Peniston chronology
Finally / We Got a Love Thang: Remix Collection (1992)	Thought 'Ya Knew (1994)	Remix Collection (1994)

Singles from Thought 'Ya Knew
- 1. "I'm in the Mood" Released: December 14, 1993; 2. "I'm Not Over You" Released: April 5, 1994; 3. "Hit by Love" Released: August 1994; 4. "Keep Givin' Me Your Love" Released: February 1995 (UK, April '94)

Thought 'Ya Knew is the second solo studio album by American singer-songwriter CeCe Peniston, released on January 11, 1994, by A&M Records, and on February 10 in Japan. For this album, Peniston once again collaborated with Chicago-based producer Steve "Silk" Hurley, along with other producers Carsten Schack and Kenneth Karlin (better recognized as duo Soulshock & Karlin) from Denmark, David Morales, Sir Jinx, and on one track ("Forever in My Heart") also with the multiple Grammy Award-nominee Brian McKnight.

Deciding not to get pigeonholed into the dance genre, Peniston recorded several ballads for the album, trying to move into an R&B direction. Unlike its predecessor Finally, Peniston's second album was, therefore, a calculated mixture of pop ballads and R&B beats, though incorporating also other genres, such as jazz ("I'm in the Mood"), funk (I'm Not Over You"), reggae ("Through Those Doors") and gospel ("I Will Be Received").

The album received generally mixed reviews from music critics, and commercially, it proved to be a moderate success. Debuting on February 12, 1994, at number 102 on the Billboard 200, the album reached its peak a week later at number ninety-six, while spending nineteen weeks on the US chart in total. Overseas, the album entered the UK Albums Chart at number thirty-one, but charted for only two weeks there. Other territories included Switzerland (at number thirty-two), Japan (at number sixty-six), Netherlands (at number sixty-nine), and Germany (at number ninety-two).

Four official singles were released from the album, three of which entered the Billboard Hot 100, as well as the UK Singles Chart. All of them became successful on the dance chart, bringing Peniston two additional number one hits on the US Hot Dance Club Songs. In Japan, the album was shortly followed by Remix Collection, which featured alternate versions of songs issued on singles. It was reissued in Japan on September 11, 1996. The album was not accompanied by a worldwide tour.

== Critical reception ==
Professional ratings
Initial reviews (in 1994)
Review scores
Source	Rating
Billboard	(favorable)
Chicago Reader	(mixed)
Entertainment Weekly	B−
Gavin Report	(favorable)
Music & Media	(favorable)
Music Week	3/5 stars
People	(mixed)
Select	2/5 medals
The Washington Post	(favorable)

Professional ratings
Retrospective reviews (after 1994)
Review scores
Source	Rating
AllMusic	3/5 stars
Encyclopedia of Popular Music	3/5 stars

Thought 'Ya Knew received mainly mixed reviews. In terms of artistic achievement, dancefloor potential or chart performance, the album did not match the success of Peniston's debut album, Finally. Jose F. Promis from AllMusic, however, blamed the record label A&M for marketing the artist to an R&B audience, which he called the "big mistake". Giving the album three (out of five) stars, he highlighted especially "Hit by Love" as the song closer in spirit to Peniston's early dance hits, but he admitted that by that time of the single's release its "steam had worn off". Billboard magazine wrote, "Miscast in the role of dance diva, singer's best work is grounded in hip-hop/R&B-oriented grooves, both up- and midtempo."

Both critics, Martin Johnson from Chicago Reader and Johnny Huston from Entertainment Weekly agreed that the album's low points occurred on its ballads and that Peniston faltered on slower numbers. (Johnson also added that even Toni Braxton, who redefined the urban contemporary ballad, "would have trouble breathing life into them"). While Huston noticed Patti LaBelle-influenced vocal stylings (on "Through Those Doors"), Johnson recalled young Chaka Khan and stressed the pungent lower registers of the singer's voice (on "Searchin'"). People magazine found the album's problem in Peniston's big-time pop success and her new need to be seen more serious than just a dance-music artist. Calling ballads "the ballads from hell", the magazine reproached that all the slow stuff did was focus on Peniston's vocal limitations.

== Chart performance ==
"Searchin'"

"Give What I'm Givin'"

"I Will Be Received"

On February 5, 1994, the album entered at number thirty-one (its peak) in the UK Albums Chart, spending two weeks on the chart. Followed by the Oricon list on February 10, Peniston received her first and her only album chart appearance to date in Japan, at number sixty-six (two charting weeks in total) After two weeks since its release, the album entered the US Billboard 200 at number one-hundred-two on February 12, 1994. Peaking its top the following week, at number ninety-six on February 19 (nineteen weeks in the chart).

On the component, US Top R&B/Hip-Hop Albums chart, the album climbed to number twenty (being present for thirty-four weeks in the chart. Later on, the album would be classified as the seventy-first best R&B selling set of 1994.) In Dutch MegaCharts, the record started its five weeks long run on February 19, topping its third week at number sixty-nine. In addition, the album cracked the Swiss Music Charts on February 20, peaking on March 6 at number thirty-two (three weeks in the chart). And on February 28 also the German Media Control Charts, reaching at number ninety-two (with three weeks in the chart).

== Track listing ==
Thought 'Ya Knew track listing
No.	Title	Writer(s)	Producer(s)	Length
1.	"Searchin'"	Steve "Silk" Hurley; Tonia Hurley; M-Doc	S. Hurley	3:43
2.	"I'm in the Mood" (East 87th St. Mix)	Steven Nikolas; Brendon Sibley; Carsten Schack; Kenneth Karlin; Mich Hansen	Soulshock & Karlin; S. Hurley^{[a]}	4:11
3.	"Hit by Love"	Nikolas; Sibley; Schack; Karlin; Hansen	Soulshock & Karlin	4:34
4.	"Whatever It Is"	CeCe Peniston; Sir Jinx; Joc	Sir Jinx	4:35
5.	"Forever in My Heart"	Brian McKnight; Brandon Barnes	McKnight	4:47
6.	"I'm Not Over You"	S. Hurley; Jamie Principle; M-Doc	S. Hurley	4:18
7.	"Anyway You Wanna Go"	Marc Dubuclet; Tim Miner	Dubuclet	4:10
8.	"Give What I'm Givin'"	Peniston; Sir Jinx; Johny Rogers; Kymberli Armstrong	Sir Jinx	4:01
9.	"Through Those Doors"	Andrea Martin; Andres Levin; Camus Maré Celli	Levin; Celli	5:20
10.	"Let My Love Surround You"	Nikolas; Sibley	Soulshock & Karlin	4:07
11.	"Keep Givin' Me Your Love"	Nikolas; Sibley; Schack; Karlin; Hansen	Morales	6:13
12.	"If You Love Me, I Will Love You"	Dubuclet; Tim Miner	Dubuclet	4:29
13.	"Maybe It's the Way"	Peniston; Sir Jinx; Rogers	Sir Jinx	5:49
14.	"I Will Be Received"	Richard Wolf; James Wirrick	Wolf	4:36
Total length:				72:17

European and Japanese edition bonus track
No.	Title	Writer(s)	Producer(s)	Length
15.	"I'm in the Mood" (Bad Yard Club)	Nikolas; Sibley; Schack; Karlin; Hansen	Soulshock & Karlin; S. Hurley^{[a]}; Morales^{[b]}	7:23

UK, double vinyl edition bonus tracks
No.	Title	Writer(s)	Producer(s)	Length
15.	"I'm in the Mood" (Bad Yard Edit)	Nikolas; Sibley; Schack; Karlin; Hansen	Soulshock & Karlin; S. Hurley^{[a]}; Morales^{[b]}	4:11
16.	"I'm in the Mood" (Classic Mix)	Nikolas; Sibley; Schack; Karlin; Hansen	Soulshock & Karlin; S. Hurley^{[a]}; Morales^{[b]}	9:09
17.	"Searchin'" (Principle Theory Mix)	S. Hurley; T. Hurley; M-Doc	S. Hurley; Jamie Principle^{[b]}	5:31
18.	"Searchin'" (Silky Fusion Mix)	S. Hurley; T. Hurley; M-Doc	S. Hurley	7:13

Notes

- ^{^[a]} signifies an additional producer
- ^{^[b]} signifies a remix producer

== Credits and personnel ==
- CeCe Peniston – lead vocal, backing vocals, vocal arrangement, executive production
- Damon Jones – executive production
- Manny Lehman – executive production
- Mark Dubuclet – production, mixing, drum programming, programming, keyboards, bass, multi instruments
- Steve "Silk" Hurley – production, arranging, editing, mixing
- David Morales – production, arranging, percussion, mixing
- Richard Wolf – production, guitar, drum programming, keyboards
- Steven Nikolas – vocal arrangement
- Brendon Sibley – vocal arrangement
- Soulshock & Karlin – production, mixing
- Sir Jinx – production
- Andres Levin – production
- Camus Maré Celli – production
- Andrea Martin – backing vocals, talking
- Norma Jean Wright – backing vocals
- Kymberli Armstrong – backing vocals
- Myron Glasper – backing vocals
- Jackie Gusheyk – backing vocals
- Sharon Pass – backing vocals
- Chantay Savage – backing vocals
- Katreese Barnes – backing vocals
- Sherree Ford-Payne – backing vocals
- Faith Wade – choir, chorus
- Niomisha Wilson – choir, chorus
- Brian McKnight – backing vocals, multi instruments, production
- Rodney Miller – guitar
- David Fiuczynski – guitar
- Michael McDonald – guitar
- Kamaal – bass
- Greg Mull – engineering, mixing
- Daryll Dobson – engineering, mixing
- Scott Ahaus – engineering, remixing
- Doug Michael – engineering
- David Sussman – engineering
- Steve Weeder – engineering
- Craig Porteils – engineering
- John Fundingsland – engineering
- Keith Barrios – engineering
- Anna Wheaton – engineering
- Chris Wood – engineering
- Brian Kinkel – engineering
- Brad Aldredge – engineering
- Victor McCoy – engineering assistance
- Brian Young – engineering assistance
- Daniel Beroff – engineering assistance
- Craig Burbidge – mixing
- Dave Way – mixing
- Doug DeAngelis – mixing
- Ken Kessie – mixing
- Kevin Crouse – mixing assistance
- Eric Flickinger – mixing assistance
- Eddie Sexton – mixing assistance
- Devin Foutz – mixing assistance
- Christian Delatour – mixing assistance
- Johnny Rogers – keyboards
- James Wirrick – keyboards
- Fernando Harkless – saxophone
- David Wills – drums
- Alec Shantzis – programming
- Satoshi Tomiie – programming
- Terry Burrus – programming
- Greg Lawson – drum programming
- Danny Madden – conducting
- Bill Ware – vibraphone
- C-N-A – multi instruments
- Colleen Donahue-Reynolds – production coordination
- Michael Lavine – photography

== Charts ==
=== Weekly charts ===
Weekly chart performance for Thought 'Ya Knew
Chart (1994)	Peak position
Dutch Albums (Album Top 100)	69
German Albums (Offizielle Top 100)	92
Japanese Albums (Oricon)	66
Swiss Albums (Schweizer Hitparade)	32
UK Albums (Official Charts)	31
US Billboard 200	96
US Top R&B/Hip-Hop Albums (Billboard)	20

=== Year-end charts ===
Year-end chart performance for Thought 'Ya Knew
Chart (1994)	Position
US Billboard Top R&B/Hip-Hop Albums	71
