= I'm in the Mood (CeCe Peniston song) =

Single by CeCe Peniston

from the album Thought 'Ya Knew
- B-side: "Keep On Walkin'"; "Searchin'"
- Released: December 14, 1993
- Genre: R&B; new jack swing; pop; dance-pop
- Length: 4:11 (album version)
- Label: A&M
- Songwriters: Steven Nikolas; Brendon Sibley; Carsten Schack; Kenneth Karlin; Cutfather
- Producer: Soulshock and Karlin

CeCe Peniston singles chronology
"Inside That I Cried" (1992)	"I'm in the Mood" (1993)	"Keep Givin' Me Your Love" (1994)

Music video
- "Original Mix" on YouTube

"I'm in the Mood" is a song by American singer and songwriter CeCe Peniston, released in December 1993, by A&M Records, as the first commercial single from her second studio album, Thought 'Ya Knew (1994). The composition scored the singer her fourth number one on the US Billboard Hot Dance Music/Club Play chart, and also entered the top 10 of the Billboard Hot R&B chart, peaking at number seven. On the Billboard Hot 100 and Cash Box Top 100, the song peaked at number 32 and 28, respectively. In Europe, "I'm in the Mood" made number 16 on the UK Top 75, as well as entering the top 30 in the Netherlands and Switzerland. The music video was directed by Antoine Fuqua. In a 2011 interview for Boy Culture, TypePad's blogging service, Peniston disclosed that she had actually expected a better reception of the single.

A special extended remix of "Keep On Walkin'", one of the Peniston's previous singles, appeared on the B-side.

== Critical reception ==
Jose F. Promis from AllMusic described "I'm in the Mood" as "fun, jazzy, finger-snapping R&B". Upon the release, Larry Flick from Billboard magazine declared it as "a chipper, hiybound jack/pop tune that is rhythmically similar to her previous hit, 'Keep On Walkin''. The difference lies within the song's bouncy chorus and in her more flexible, well-developed vocal." He concluded, "Excellent single is proof that lightning can certainly strike twice." Dave Sholin from the Gavin Report wrote, "Who better to get audiences in a groove mood than the one-time Miss Phoenix? Some very cool mixes are sure to keep this track fresh all the way into summer." Another Gavin Report editor, Annette M. Lai, named it one of the "outstanding" tracks of the Thought 'Ya Knew album. Pan-European magazine Music & Media commented, "Finally, CeCe is riding the radio charts again with a dance single which at first seems to lack that pop sparkle of her old song material. Consider that the logical process of maturity."

Andy Beevers from Music Week stated, "After lying low in 1993, Ce Ce Peniston is poised to kick off 1994 in fine style with this single" that is "almost as infectious as her first hits", and "a Top 40 contender." A reviewer from People Magazine said that her "triumphant wail" is "harnessed" on the song, viewing it as "conneet-the-dots dance pop". Tim Jeffery from the Record Mirror Dance Update wrote that Peniston "seems to have got that knack of combining impossibly catchy and uplifting songs with dancefloor appeal". Mark Frith from Smash Hits gave it a score of four out of five, complimenting it as "another energic piano-laden number with her trademark wonderful vocals and one of those nagging basslines." Mike Joyce from The Washington Post felt songs like "I'm in the Mood" "are catchy and clever dance tracks, all right, and savvy too".

== Credits and personnel ==
- CeCe Peniston – lead/back vocal, vocal arrangement, executive producer
- Steven Nikolas – writer, vocal arrangement
- Brendon Sibley – writer, vocal arrangement
- Carsten Schack – writer, mix, producer
- Kenneth Karlin – writer, producer
- Mich Hedin Hansen – writer, co-producer
- Steve Hurley – writer, remix, edits, additional producer
- David Morales – reproduction, mix, additional drums, percussion
- Marc Williams – remix
- Jere M.C. – remix
- Sir Jinx – remix
- Dave Way – mix
- Johny Rogers – additional keyboards
- Eric Kupper – keyboard programming
- Jamie Principle – additional edits
- Rodney Miller – additional guitar
- Scott Ahaus – remix engineer
- Jeff Lewis – engineer
- David Sussman – engineer
- Doug Micheal – engineer
- Darryl D. Dobson – engineer
- Greg Mull – engineer
- Manny Lehman – executive producer
- Damon Jones – executive producer
- Studio 56 – studio
- Westlake, Los Angeles, California – studio
- River North Recording, Chicago, Illinois – mix
- Quad Studios, (New York City) – mix
- Tanglewood Studios, Chicago – mix
- Larabee Studios, West L.A., California – mix
- Star Trax Recording, Chicago, Illinois – mix
- Steven and Brendon Songs/Casadida Publishing (ASCAP) – publisher
- EMI Virgin Music – publisher, admin

Additional credits

- "Crazy Love" (double A-side)
- "Keep On Walkin'" (B-side)
- "[Searchin'" (B-side)

== Track listings and formats ==
- 7", US, #31458 0498 7
1. "I'm in the Mood" (East 87th St. Mix) - 4:11
2. "Keep On Walkin'" (Special Extended Mix) - 5:36
- 7", UK, #580 454-7
- CS, UK, #580 454-4
- CD3, JP, Promo, #PODM-1021
1. "I'm in the Mood" (UK Radio Mix) - 3:55
2. "I'm in the Mood" (In Da Soul 7" Mix) - 4:20
- CD, DE, #580 498-2
1. "I'm in the Mood" (East 87th St. Mix) - 4:11
2. "I'm in the Mood" (UK Radio Mix) - 3:55
- CD, AU, #580 460-2
1. "I'm in the Mood" (East 87th St. Mix) - 4:11
2. "I'm in the Mood" (Jinx Mix) - 4:29
3. "I'm in the Mood" (Bad Yard Edit) - 3:57
- CS, US, #31458 0460 4
1. "I'm in the Mood" (East 87th St. Mix) - 4:11
2. "I'm in the Mood" (Jinx Mix) - 4:29
3. "I'm in the Mood" (Bad Yard Club) - 7:24
- 12", EU & UK, #580 455-1
1. "I'm in the Mood" (Bad Yard Mix) - 7:10
2. "I'm in the Mood" (East 87th St. 12" Mix) - 6:19
3. "I'm in the Mood" (In Da Soul 12" Mix) - 4:48
4. "Searchin'" (Silk In The House Mix) - 6:27
- MCD, EU, #580 499-2
1. "I'm in the Mood" (East 87th St. Mix) - 4:11
2. "I'm in the Mood" (UK Radio Mix) - 3:55
3. "I'm in the Mood" (Jinx Mix) - 4:29
4. "I'm in the Mood" (In Da Soul 12" Mix) - 4:48
- MCD, US, #31458 0483 2
1. "I'm in the Mood" (East 87th St. Mix) - 4:11
2. "I'm in the Mood" (Bad Yard Club) - 7:24
3. "I'm in the Mood" (Original Mix) - 4:08
4. "Keep On Walkin'" (Special Extended Mix) - 5:36
- 12", US, #31458 0461 1
1. "I'm in the Mood" (Bad Yard Club) - 7:24
2. "I'm in the Mood" (Classic Vocal Mix) - 9:09
3. "I'm in the Mood" (East 87th St. 12" Mix) - 6:19
4. "I'm in the Mood" (Old Skool 12" Mix) - 6:10
5. "I'm in the Mood" (In Da Soul 12" Mix) - 4:48
6. "I'm in the Mood" (The Mood Mix) - 7:23
- MCD, UK, #580 455-2
- MCD, UK, Promo, #580 455-2DJ
1. "I'm in the Mood" (UK Radio Mix) - 3:55
2. "I'm in the Mood" (East 87th St. Mix) - 4:11
3. "I'm in the Mood" (Bad Yard Mix) - 7:10
4. "I'm in the Mood" (Classic Vocal Mix) - 9:09
5. "I'm in the Mood" (East 87th St. 12" Mix) - 6:19
6. "I'm in the Mood" (In Da Soul 12" Mix) - 4:48
- MCD, US, Promo, #31458 8234 2
1. "I'm in the Mood" (East 87th St. Mix) - 4:11
2. "I'm in the Mood" (Old Skool 12" Mix) - 6:10
3. "I'm in the Mood" (In Da Soul 7" Mix) - 4:20
4. "I'm in the Mood" (Jinx Mix) - 4:29
5. "I'm in the Mood" (Original Mix) - 4:08
6. "I'm in the Mood" (Bad Yard Edit) - 3:57
- 12", EU, Double, Promo, #AMYDJ455
- 12", UK, Double, Promo, #AMY 455 DJ
1. "I'm in the Mood" (Bad Yard Mix) - 7:10
2. "I'm in the Mood" (Classic Vocal Mix) - 9:09
3. "I'm in the Mood" (East 87th St. 12" Mix) - 6:19
4. "I'm in the Mood" (In Da Soul 12" Mix) - 4:48
5. "I'm in the Mood" (Bad Yard Club) - 7:24
6. "I'm in the Mood" (The Mood Mix) - 7:23
7. "I'm in the Mood" (Old Skool 12" Mix) - 6:10
8. "I'm in the Mood" (In Da Soul Instrumental) - 3:22
- 12", US, Double, Promo, #31458 8226 1
1. "I'm in the Mood" (The Mood Mix) - 7:23
2. "I'm in the Mood" (Classic Vocal Mix) - 9:09
3. "I'm in the Mood" (East 87th St. 12" Mix) - 6:19
4. "I'm in the Mood" (Old Skool 12" Mix) - 6:10
5. "I'm in the Mood" (In Da Soul 12" Mix) - 4:48
6. "I'm in the Mood" (Hip Hop Mix) - 4:28
7. "I'm in the Mood" (East 87th Instrumental) - 4:26
8. "I'm in the Mood" (In Da Soul Instrumental) - 3:22
9. "I'm in the Mood" (The Mood Mix) - 7:23
10. "I'm in the Mood" (Bad Yard Dub) - 6:53
11. "I'm in the Mood" (Old Skool Instrumental) - 4:48

== Charts ==
=== Weekly charts ===
Chart (1994)	Peak position
Australia (ARIA)	197
Canada Retail Singles (The Record)	10
Canada Top Singles (RPM)	88
Canada Dance/Urban (RPM)	8
Europe (Eurochart Hot 100)	53
Europe (European Dance Radio)	3
Europe (European Hit Radio)	21
Germany (Media Control Charts)	68
Netherlands (Dutch Top 40)	25
Netherlands (Single Top 100)	22
Switzerland (Schweizer Hitparade)	29
UK Singles (OCC)	16
UK Airplay (Music Week)	10
UK Dance (Music Week)	4
UK Club Chart (Music Week)	3
US Billboard Hot 100	32
US Dance Club Songs (Billboard)	1
US Dance Singles Sales (Billboard)	3
US Hot R&B/Hip-Hop Songs (Billboard)	7
US Mainstream Top 40 (Billboard)	24
US Rhythmic Top 40 (Billboard)	20
US Cash Box Top 100	28

=== Year-end charts ===
Chart (1994)	Position
Europe (European Dance Radio)	22
US Top Dance Music Club Play Singles (Billboard)	44
US Top Dance Music Maxi-Singles Sales (Billboard)	42
US Top R&B Singles (Billboard)	42
US Top R&B Singles Airplay (Billboard)	31

== See also ==
- List of number-one dance singles of 1994 (U.S.)
