= Keep Givin' Me Your Love =

1994 single by CeCe Peniston

Single by CeCe Peniston

from the album Thought 'Ya Knew
- Released: March 21, 1994
- Genre: House; dance-pop
- Length: 6:13 (album version)
- Label: A&M; Columbia; The Town House
- Songwriters: Steven Nikolas; Brendon Sibley; Carsten Schack; Kenneth Karlin; Cutfather
- Producers: David Morales; West End

CeCe Peniston singles chronology
"I'm in the Mood" (1993)	"Keep Givin' Me Your Love" (1994)	"I'm Not Over You" (1994)

Music video
- "Keep Givin' Me Your Love" on YouTube

"Keep Givin' Me Your Love" is a song by American singer-songwriter CeCe Peniston, originally from her second studio album, Thought 'Ya Knew (1994). It was produced by David Morales and West End. While in the US, it was issued as the fifth single release in 1995, by A&M and Columbia Records, in the UK the song was released as the second single in April 1994. After peaking at number 35 on the UK Singles Chart, it reached at number four on the US Billboard Hot Dance Music/Club Play chart in March 1995 and was Peniston's first song that failed to enter the Billboard Hot 100, stopping at number one on the Bubbling Under Hot 100 Singles chart. The song was also classified the Billboard Hot Dance Breakouts number one in the category of Maxi-Singles Sales on March 4 and the Billboard Hot Dance Breakouts number three for the category of Club Play Singles on January 21, 1995.

== Critical reception ==
Jose F. Promis from AllMusic described "Keep Givin' Me Your Love" as an "agreeable" house track. Larry Flick from Billboard magazine wrote, "Giddy with the youthful exuberance and romance that made 'Finally' a classic, this bright pop/dance ditty could be the boost Peniston need to once again win the hearts of top 40 programmers." Pan-European magazine Music & Media commented, "The intro, with its simple piano chord on a dance beat, and the "false start" of the vocals–sort of stuttering she falls into the song–instantly give away who it is." Andy Beevers from Music Week named it Pick of the Week in the category of Dance and gave it a score of four out of five, declaring it as "another upbeat and catchy soulful house track that benefits greatly from some West End remixes. This should not have any trouble following 'In The Mood' into the Top 40." People Magazine described it as a "thump-fest". The Record Mirror Dance Update deemed it "another happy 'hands in the air' handbag classic". RM editor James Hamilton named it a "cheerful plonking canterer" in his weekly dance column.

== Credits and personnel ==
- CeCe Peniston – lead/back vocal, executive producer
- Steven Nikolas – writer, vocal arrangement
- Brendon Sibley – writer, vocal arrangement
- Carsten Schack – writer
- Kenneth Karlin – writer
- Cutfather – writer
- Norma Jean Wright – back vocal
- Bem Shi Jones – back vocal
- Katreese Barnes – back vocal
- David Morales – producer, mix/remix, arranger, percussion
- Eddie Gordon (as West End) – remix, additional producer
- Danny Madded – background conductor
- David Sussman – engineer
- Manny Lehman – executive producer
- Satoshi Tomiie – keyboard programming
- Alec Shantzis – programming
- Terry Burrus – programming
- Damon Jones – executive producer
- David Collins – mastering
- Patricia Sullivan – mastering
- Gabrielle Raumberger – art direction
- Dylan Tran – design
- Michael Lavine – photography
- Quad Studios, (New York City) – studio, mix
- A&M Mastering Studios, Los Angeles – mastering
- Steven and Brendon Songs/Casadida Publishing (ASCAP) – publisher
- EMI Virgin Music – publisher, admin

== Track listings and formats ==
- VHS, UK, Promo, #(–)
1. "Keep Givin' Me Your Love" (West End Radio Mix) - 3:46
- 12", UK, #(–)
1. "Keep Givin' Me Your Love" (Wild And Groovy Dub) - 6:03
- CD, MX, Promo, #PRCD 96331
- CD, US, Promo, #CSK 6732
1. "Keep Givin' Me Your Love" (West End Remix) - 5:56
- CD, US, Promo, #CSK 6826
1. "Keep Givin' Me Your Love" (West End Radio Edit) - 3:42
- 7", UK, #580 548-7
- CS, UK, #580 548-4
- CD, DE, #580 548-2
1. "Keep Givin' Me Your Love" (West End Radio Mix) - 3:46
2. "Keep Givin' Me Your Love" (Album Edit) - 3:44
- CD, AT, #661473 1
1. "Keep Givin' Me Your Love" (West End Radio Edit) - 3:42
2. "Keep Givin' Me Your Love" (West End Remix) - 5:56
- CD, AT, #661473 2
1. "Keep Givin' Me Your Love" (West End Radio Edit) - 3:42
2. "Keep Givin' Me Your Love" (West End Remix) - 5:56
3. "Keep Givin' Me Your Love" (Boss Mix) - 11:54
- 12", EU, #COL 661473 6
- 12", US, #44 77794
1. "Keep Givin' Me Your Love" (David Morales Remix) - 7:03
2. "Keep Givin' Me Your Love" (West End Remix) - 5:56
3. "Keep Givin' Me Your Love" (Boss Mix) - 11:54
4. "Keep Givin' Me Your Love" (West End Radio Edit) - 3:42
- 12", (–), Promo, #CAS 6727
- MCD, AU, #661260 2
1. "Keep Givin' Me Your Love" (David Morales Remix) - 7:03
2. "Keep Givin' Me Your Love" (West End Remix) - 5:56
3. "Keep Givin' Me Your Love" (Boss Mix) - 11:54
4. "Keep Givin' Me Your Love" (Radio Remix) - 3:52
- 12", UK, #580 549-1
- 12", UK, Promo, #AMYDJ549
1. "Keep Givin' Me Your Love" (West End Remix) - 5:56
2. "Keep Givin' Me Your Love" (Album Version) - 6:16
3. "Keep Givin' Me Your Love" (Wild And Groovy Dub) - 6:03
4. "Keep Givin' Me Your Love" (2 Moody Dub) - 5:29
- MCD, EU, #580 581-2
1. "Keep Givin' Me Your Love" (West End Radio Mix) - 3:46
2. "Keep Givin' Me Your Love" (West End Remix) - 5:56
3. "Keep Givin' Me Your Love" (Album Version) - 6:16
4. "Keep Givin' Me Your Love" (Wild And Groovy Dub) - 6:03
- MCD, UK, #580 549-2
1. "Keep Givin' Me Your Love" (West End Radio Mix) - 3:19
2. "Keep Givin' Me Your Love" (West End Remix) - 5:56
3. "Keep Givin' Me Your Love" (Album Version) - 6:16
4. "Keep Givin' Me Your Love" (Wild And Groovy Dub) - 6:03
5. "Keep Givin' Me Your Love" (2 Moody Dub) - 5:29

== Charts ==
Chart (1994)	Peak position
Europe (Eurochart Hot 100)	91
Europe (European Dance Radio)	20
UK Singles (OCC)	36
UK Airplay (Music Week)	25
UK Dance (Music Week)	6
UK Club Chart (Music Week)	9

Chart (1995)	Peak position
Australia (ARIA)	99
Canada Dance/Urban (RPM)	13
New Zealand (RIANZ)	26
US Bubbling Under Hot 100 Singles (Billboard)	1
US Dance Club Songs (Billboard)	4
US Dance Singles Sales (Billboard)	11
US Mainstrean Top 40 (Billboard)	40
US Rhythmic Top 40 (Billboard)	40
US Cash Box Top 100	61
