= I Like It (Overweight Pooch song) =

- Artwork for UK single release

Single by Overweight Pooch featuring CeCe Peniston

from the album Female Preacher
- B-side: "Remix"
- Released: October 29, 1991
- Recorded: 1991
- Length: 5:43 (album version)
- Label: A&M
- Songwriters: Linnear; Delgado
- Producers: Delgado; Morales (remix)

CeCe Peniston singles chronology
"Finally" (1991)	"I Like It'" (1991)	"We Got a Love Thang" (1992)

"I Like It" is a song by American rapper Overweight Pooch featuring American singer-songwriter CeCe Peniston, who contributed vocals on the record. The single was written by E.L. Linnear and Felipe Delgado (both later involved also in recording Peniston's debut album Finally), and released in October 1991 by A&M Records. It reached number sixteen on the US Billboard Hot Dance Music/Club Play chart, and number fifty-eight on the UK Singles Chart.

== Track listings and formats ==
- 7", UK, #AM 847/390 847-7
1. "I Like It" (Def Party Radio Mix Edit) – 3:53
2. "I Like It" (LP Radio Mix Edit) – 3:40
- MCD, UK, #AMCD 847/390 847-2
1. "I Like It" (Def Party Radio Mix Edit) – 3:53
2. "I Like It" (Def Party Mix 12") – 7:51
3. "I Like It" (Remix Version) – 5:31
4. "I Like It" (LP Radio Mix Edit) – 3:40
- 12", UK, #AMY 847/390 847-1
- 12", UK, Promo, #AMYDJ 847
1. "I Like It" (Def Party Radio Mix Edit) – 3:53
2. "I Like It" (Def Party Mix 12") – 7:51
3. "I Like It" (Spaced Out Dub)
4. "I Like It" (Remix Instrumental) – 5:48
5. "I Like It" (LP Radio Mix Edit) – 3:40
6. "I Like It" (Remix Version) – 5:31
7. "I Like It" (Factory Mix) – 5:33
- 12", US, #75021 2393 1
- 12", US, Promo, #75021 2393 1
1. "I Like It" (Def Party Mix 12") – 7:51
2. "I Like It" (Factory Mix) – 5:33
3. "I Like It" (Red Zone Dub) – 5:23
4. "I Like It" (Def Party Radio Mix) – 4:37
5. "I Like It" (Remix Version) – 5:31
6. "I Like It" (Remix Instrumental) – 5:48
7. "I Like It" (LP Radio Mix) – 4:39

== Credits and personnel ==
Management

- Executive producers – Manny Lehman, Mark Mazzetti
- Recording studios – The Wizard Electric, Glendale, Arizona; Chaton Studios, Phoenix, Arizona (mixing)
- Publishing – Main Lot Music, Wax Museum Music/Productions (BMI)

Production

- Writers – Felipe Delgado, Elbert Lee Linnear
- Producers – Delgado (as DJ Wax Dawg), David Morales (remix)
- Mixing – Delgado
- Remixing – Morales, Rodney Jackson (as R.K. Jackson)
- Engineering – Kellan Fluckiger and Delgado; John Poppo and Otto D'Agnolo (as Rusty D'Anglo) (remix)

Personnel

- Lead vocals – Tonya Davis (rapping)
- Backing vocals – Cecilia Peniston
- Percussion – Morales (remix)
- Keyboards – Eric Kupper (remix)

== Charts ==
Chart (1992)	Peak position
UK Singles (OCC)	58
UK Dance (Music Week)	13
US Hot Dance Music Club Play (Billboard)	16
