= Crazy Love (CeCe Peniston song) =

Single by CeCe Peniston

from the album Finally
- Released: August 24, 1992
- Genre: House; hip-hop; new jack swing
- Length: 4:48 (album version)
- Label: A&M
- Songwriters: George Lyter; Michael O'Hara; Denise Rich
- Producer: Daniel Abraham

CeCe Peniston singles chronology
"Keep On Walkin'" (1992)	"Crazy Love" (1992)	"Inside That I Cried" (1992)

Music video
- "Crazy Love" on YouTube

"Crazy Love" is a song by American musician CeCe Peniston, released on her debut album, Finally (1992) on A&M Records. It is written by George Lyter, Michael O'Hara and Denise Rich, and produced by Daniel Abraham. The title was first issued in the UK as the fourth single from the album, peaking at number forty-four, while in the US (released as her fifth solo single), it reached number thirty-one on the R&B chart in February 1993 after its peak at number ninety-seven on the Billboard Hot 100.

== Critical reception ==
Craig Lytle from AllMusic described the song as "a midtempo number with an alluring chorus melody enhanced by a brisk string arrangement." Larry Flick from Billboard magazine wrote, "Here's yet another gem from CeCe's sparkling, unstoppable debut album, Finally. A sultry, swing beat is first refashioned with raw hip-hop beats, then transformed into a spirited house romp. All the while, CeCe belts with an assurance reminiscent of Teena Marie." He added that the right edit "could reignite pop and urban radio fires." Randy Clark from Cashbox said it's "a sexy, easy groovin', mid-tempo dance track with almost as many lives as a cat".

== Credits and personnel ==
Management

- Executive producers – Manny Lehman, Mark Mazzetti
- Recording studios – Prime Cuts & Axis Studios; Right Track Studios and Bass Hit Recording (mix); all New York City, New York
- Publishing – George You've Got It Music, O'Hara Music, MCA (BMI), IDG (ASCAP)

Production

- Writers – George Lyter, Michael Judson O'Hara, Denise Eisenberg Rich
- Producer, mixing and remixing – Daniel Abraham
- Remix reconstruction – Luis Vega (as "Little" Louie) and Kenny Gonzalez (as "Dope")
- Engineering – Rick Van Benschoten, Lolly Grodner (assistant), David Darlington (remix)

Personnel

- Lead vocals – Cecilia Peniston
- Keyboards – Peter Schwartz, Terrance Burrus, Joseph E. Moskowitz
- Programming and additional keyboards – Frederick Quayle (as Mac Quayle) and Joseph Hornof
- Cover art – Simon Fowler
- Design – Simon Carrington

== Track listings and formats ==
- 7", US, #AM 0060/580060-7
1. "Crazy Love" (LP Edit) - 4:13
2. "Crazy Love" (A.R. Mix 7") - 3:51
- CS, US, #31458 8017 4
1. "Crazy Love" (LP Edit) - 4:13
2. "Crazy Love" (Hard Radio Mix) - 4:01
- 12", EU & UK, #AMY 0060/580 060-1
- 12", UK, Promo, #AMYDJ 0060
- 12", UK, Promo, #AMY 060 DJ
1. "Crazy Love" (A.R. Mix 12") - 5:39
2. "Crazy Love" (Kenlou 12") - 7:42
3. "Crazy Love" (LP Edit) - 4:13
4. "Crazy Love" (M.A.W. House Dub) - 7:23
5. "Crazy Love" (M.A.W. Dub) - 4:52
- MCD, EU & UK, #AMCD 0060/580060-2
1. "Crazy Love" (LP Edit) - 4:13
2. "Crazy Love" (LP Version) - 4:49
3. "Crazy Love" (A.R. Mix 7") - 3:51
4. "Crazy Love" (A.R. Mix 12") - 5:39
5. "Crazy Love" (Kenlou 12") - 7:42
6. "Crazy Love" (M.A.W. House Dub) - 7:23
- MCD, US, Promo, #31458 8017 2
1. "Crazy Love" (LP Edit) - 4:13
2. "Crazy Love" (Radio Remix) - 4:09
3. "Crazy Love" (Hard Radio Mix) - 4:01
4. "Crazy Love" (B. Boy Edit) - 4:32
5. "Crazy Love" (LP Version) - 4:48
6. "Crazy Love" (12" Remix) - 7:21
- 12", US, #31458 0034 1
1. "Crazy Love" (12" Remix) - 7:21
2. "Crazy Love" (Dub Version) - 5:27
3. "Crazy Love" (LP Edit) - 4:13
4. "Crazy Love" (B. Boy Mix) - 5:27
5. "Crazy Love" (Krazy Dub) - 7:28
6. "Crazy Love" (Hard Radio Mix) - 4:01
- 12", US, Double, Promo, #31458 8017 1
1. "Crazy Love" (12" Remix) - 7:21
2. "Crazy Love" (Dub Version) - 5:27
3. "Crazy Love" (LP Version) - 4:48
4. "Crazy Love" (B. Boy Mix) - 5:27
5. "Crazy Love" (5 OH Beats) - 2:36
6. "Crazy Love" (Hard Radio Mix) - 4:01
7. "Crazy Love" (Kenlou 12") - 7:42
8. "Crazy Love" (M.A.W. House Dub) - 7:23
9. "Crazy Love" (M.A.W. Dub) - 4:52
10. "Crazy Love" (Krazy Dub) - 7:28
11. "Crazy Love" (Bass Dub) - 4:23
- VA

MAW • House Masters (4xCD) • UK, #HOMAS21CD
— 35. "Crazy Love" (Krazy Dub) - 7:28

== Charts ==
Chart (1992)	Peak position
Europe (European Dance Radio)	24
UK Singles (OCC)	44
UK Airplay (Music Week)	29
UK Dance (Music Week)	8
UK Club Chart (Music Week)	13
US Billboard Hot 100	97

Chart (1993)	Peak position
US Hot R&B/Hip-Hop Songs (Billboard)	31
