= I'm Not Over You =

1994 single by CeCe Peniston

Single by CeCe Peniston

from the album Thought 'Ya Knew
- B-side: "Searchin'" (US); remix
- Released: April 5, 1994
- Recorded: 1993
- Studio: River North Studios, Chicago, Illinois
- Genre: R&B; funk; hip hop
- Length: 4:18 (album version)
- Label: A&M
- Songwriters: Steve "Silk" Hurley; Jamie Principle; Marc Williams
- Producer: Steve "Silk" Hurley

CeCe Peniston singles chronology
"Keep Givin' Me Your Love" (1994)	"I'm Not Over You" (1994)	"Hit by Love" (1994)

Music video
- "I'm Not Over You" on YouTube

"I'm Not Over You" is a song by American singer-songwriter and former beauty queen CeCe Peniston, originally recorded for her second album, Thought 'Ya Knew (1994), which was released on A&M Records. It was written by Steve "Silk" Hurley, Jamie Principle and Marc Williams, and produced by Hurley. The single (in the UK available only as B-side of the "Hit by Love" release) achieved number two on the US Billboard Dance Club Songs chart, and number ten on the Billboard Hot R&B/Hip-Hop Songs chart. On the Billboard Hot 100, the song charted at number forty-one. The B-side of the single included "Searchin'", which was previously released only for promotional purposes. Hurley earned the 1997 ASCAP Writer's Award for writing "I'm Not Over You".

== Critical reception ==
Jose F. Promis from AllMusic complimented "I'm Not Over You" as "fun, jazzy, finger-snapping R&B". Larry Flick from Billboard magazine felt the song "hangs on a similar [to "I'm in the Mood"] funk/hip-hop tip", adding that "she flexes her nicely matured voice to good effect, gingerly weaving in and around the rugged beat and pulsating synth melody." Troy J. Augusto from Cash Box wrote, "Nice follow-up here to Peniston's last, semi-successful 'In the Mood' release will more than likely top that tune chart-wise. CeCe's powerful, accomplished vocal style and the song's undeniable groove should go a long way in further establishing Ms. Peniston’s urban/R&B credentials." He concluded, "A star in the making, for sure."

Dave Sholin from the Gavin Report wrote, "Some artists have a way with setting just the right mood. That seems to be a gift that CeCe's been blessed with, and she has no problem putting this song through its proper paces." Another GR editor, Annette M. Lai, described it as "hip-hop and jazz-flavored", naming it one of the "outstanding tracks" of Thought 'Ya Knew. Ralph Tee from Music Week's RM Dance Update concluded, "With all its infectious hooks", this track "is the stand-out cut" of the album. Mike Joyce from The Washington Post felt that "I'm Not Over You" "reveals her soulfulness."

== Awards and nominations ==
ASCAP Award

Year	Nominated artist	Category	Result
1997	Steve Hurley	ASCAP Writer's Award	Won

== Track listings and formats ==
- CD3, JP, #PODM-1037
1. "I'm Not Over You" (LP Version) – 4:18
2. "I'm Not Over You" (Silk's Over House 12" Mix) – 6:35
- MCD, US, #31458 0575 2
1. "I'm Not Over You" (Old Skool 12" Mix) – 7:04
2. "I'm Not Over You" (Silk's Over House 12" Mix) – 6:35
3. "I'm Not Over You" (LP Version) – 4:18
4. "Searchin'" (Silk's Fusion Mix) – 7:13
- MCS, US, #31458 0574 4
1. "I'm Not Over You" (LP Version) – 4:18
2. "I'm Not Over You" (Old Skool 7" Mix) – 3:54
3. "I'm Not Over You" (Silk's Over House 12" Mix) – 6:35
4. "I'm Not Over You" (Flava Mix) – 4:12
- MCD, US, Promo, #31458 8277 2
1. "I'm Not Over You" (LP Version) – 4:18
2. "I'm Not Over You" (Flava Mix) – 4:12
3. "I'm Not Over You" (Old Skool 7" Mix) – 3:54
4. "I'm Not Over You" (Hip Hop Mix with Rap) – 4:34
5. "I'm Not Over You" (Silk's Over House Radio Mix) – 4:37
- 12", US, #31458 0575 1
1. "I'm Not Over You" (Silk's Over House 12" Mix) – 6:35
2. "I'm Not Over You" (Deep Tribal Mix) – 5:34
3. "I'm Not Over You" (Old Skool 12" Mix) – 7:04
4. "I'm Not Over You" (Junior's Factory Mix) – 9:30
5. "I'm Not Over You" (Jamie's Under the Swing Mix) – 6:56
6. "I'm Not Over You" (LP Version) – 4:18
- 12", US, Promo, Double, #31458 8277 1
1. "I'm Not Over You" (Silk's Over House 12" Mix) – 6:35
2. "I'm Not Over You" (Over House Instrumental) – 6:34
3. "I'm Not Over You" (LP Version) – 4:18
4. "I'm Not Over You" (Junior's Factory Mix) – 9:30
5. "I'm Not Over You" (Jamie's Under the Swing Mix) – 6:56
6. "I'm Not Over You" (Old Skool 12" Mix) – 7:04
7. "I'm Not Over You" (Urban Swing Mix without Rap) – 3:56
8. "I'm Not Over You" (Hip Hop Mix with Rap) – 4:34
9. "I'm Not Over You" (Deep Tribal Mix) – 5:34
10. "I'm Not Over You" (Junior's Factory Instrumental) – 9:16
11. "I'm Not Over You" (Over Beats Mix) – 2:57

== Credits and personnel ==
- CeCe Peniston – lead/back vocal, executive producer
- Steve Hurley – writer, mix, remix, arranger, engineer
- Jamie Principle – writer
- Marc Williams (as M-Doc) – writer (rapping), remix, additional producer
- Jere McAllister (as Jere M.C.) – remix, additional producer
- Donald Paul Mattern – remix, additional producer
- Damon Jones – remix, executive producer
- Rory Bennett – remix
- Sharon Pass – back vocal
- Chantay Savage – back vocal
- Tommye Miller – back vocal
- Aries I – rapping
- Frederick Jorio (as Fred Jorio) – engineer, programming
- Scott Ahaus – engineer
- Steve Weeden – engineer
- Raven Symone – engineer
- David Collins – mastering
- Darryl Dean Dobson – mix
- Manny Lehman – executive producer
- Westlake Audio, Los Angeles, California – mix
- The Skool, Chicago, Illinois – mix
- A&M Mastering Studios, L.A. – mastering

== Charts ==
=== Weekly charts ===
Weekly chart performance for "I'm Not Over You"
Chart (1994)	Peak position
UK Club Chart (Music Week)	96
US Billboard Hot 100	41
US Dance Club Songs (Billboard)	2
US Dance Singles Sales (Billboard)	17
US Hot R&B/Hip-Hop Songs (Billboard)	10
US Rhythmic Top 40 (Billboard)	31
US Cash Box Top 100	59

=== Year-end charts ===
Year-end chart performance for "I'm Not Over You"
Chart (1994)	Position
US Hot Dance Club Play (Billboard)	9
US Top R&B Singles (Billboard)	32
