= Felipe Delgado =

Felipe Delgado may refer to:

- Felipe Delgado (record producer) (born 1969), American DJ, songwriter and record producer
- Felipe Delgado (swimmer) (born 1973), Ecuadorian swimmer
- Cuban Link (Felix Delgado, born 1974), Cuban rapper
