= Female Preacher =

Studio album by Overweight Pooch
- Released: July 9, 1991
- Recorded: 1991
- Genre: Hip hop
- Length: 47:21
- Label: A&M
- Producer: DJ Wax Dawg, "Juice" The Electric Wire, Tonya Davis, Kellan Fluckiger, Manny Lehman, Mark Mazzetti

CeCe Peniston chronology
Female Preacher (1991)	Finally (1992)

Singles from Female Preacher
- 1. "Ace Is a Spade"; 2. "I Like It"

Female Preacher is the only studio album recorded by Tonya Davis, a US rapper better known as Overweight Pooch, which was released in 1991 on A&M Records. Although the record indicated that Pooch had some potential, her album didn't go far commercially.

Three songs were issued on single including a promo release, "Hip House Party", initially also promoted on Jam Harder: The A&M Underground Dance Compilation in 1990. The compilation scored at number sixty-three on the U.S. R&B/Hip-Hop Albums chart and at number one-hundred-thirty-one on the Top 200 Billboard Albums. "Ace Is a Spade", originally titled as "Ace a Spade", contained samples of "New Day" and the James Brown's hit "Soul Power" The final single from the set "I Like It", it featured background vocals by CeCe Peniston who also contributed to the set with additional two tracks that she also co-wrote; "Kickin' Da Blues" and "Female Preacher". The single itself reached number sixteen in the U.S. Billboard Hot Dance/Music Club Play chart, and peaked at number fifty-eight on the UK Singles Chart in January 1992.

== Track listing ==
No.	Title	Writer(s)	Featured artist	Length
1.	"Feeling Good"	T. Smith, A. Smith, F. Delgado, J. Brown		4:47
2.	"Ace Is a Spade"	T. Davis, F. Delgado		3:45
3.	"Boogie-in"	T-Wax, F. Delgado		3:08
4.	"Pooch's Pimpin' Playhouse/Who's Pimping Who"	T. Davis, F. Delgado		5:05
5.	"Kickin' Da Blues"	E.L. Linnear, F. Delgado, C. Peniston	CeCe Peniston	4:16
6.	"I Like It"	E.L. Linnear, F. Delgado	CeCe Peniston	5:43
7.	"Female Preacher"	E.L. Linnear, F. Delgado, C. Peniston	CeCe Peniston	6:31
8.	"The Overweight Jam"	T. Davis, F. Delgado, L. Ritchie, W. Orange		3:37
9.	"Queen of Rap"	T. Davis, F. Delgado		3:32
10.	"Hip House Party"	E.L. Linnear, F. Delgado		4:24
11.	"Chat Trax"	T. Davis, F. Delgado		2:33
Total length:				47:21

== Releases ==
- US, 75021 5349 (LP, CD, MC)
- Germany, 395 349 (CD)

== Credits and personnel ==
- Tonya Davis - lead vocal, writer, co-producer
- CeCe Peniston - back vocal, co-writer
- Felipe Delgado - writer, producer, engineer, mix, cuts/scratches
- Andrew Smith - writer, producer
- T. Smith - writer
- James Brown - writer
- L. Collins - writer
- T-Wax - writer
- Elbert Lee Linnear - writer
- J.C. Styles - writer
- Lionel Richie - writer
- Walter Orange - writer
- Thomas McClary - writer
- Ronald La Pread - writer
- Milan Williams - writer
- William King - writer
- Kellan Fluckiger - additional producer, engineer, trumpet
- Manny Lehman - executive producer, additional producer, mix
- Ramone Forrestor - additional producer
- Mark Mazzetti - executive producer
- DJ Mark Mello - cuts/scratches
- Gail "Sky" King - mix
- Clark Kent - mix
- Jack Benson - engineer
- Eric Eden - overdubs
- Brian Gardner - mastering
- Kenne "Pee" Perkins - management
- Len Peltier - art direction
- Boomin' WD - design
- John Casado - photography
- The Wizard Electric, Glendale, Arizona - studio
- Electric Lady Studios, New York City - mix
- Unique Recording Studios, NYC - mix
- Cherokee Studios, Hollywood, CA - mix
- Bernie Grundman Mastering - mastering

== Charts ==
"Female Preacher" by Overweight Pooch
The title song co-written and performed by CeCe Peniston

=== Singles ===
Year	Single	Peak positions	
Year	Single	UK	US Dance
1991	"Ace Is a Spade"	—	—
1991	"I Like It" featuring CeCe Peniston	58	16
"—" denotes a single that did not chart or was not released in the region.
