= We Got a Love Thang =

1991 single by CeCe Peniston

Single by CeCe Peniston

from the album Finally
- B-side: "Finally" (US); Remix
- Released: December 30, 1991
- Genre: House; dance-pop
- Length: 5:29
- Label: A&M; Polydor (Australia)
- Songwriters: Miller; McAllister; Savage
- Producers: Hurley; Remix: Miller; Joshua

CeCe Peniston singles chronology
"I Like It" (1991)	"We Got a Love Thang" (1991)	"Keep On Walkin'" (1992)

Music video
- "We Got a Love Thang" on YouTube

"We Got a Love Thang" is a song by American singer-songwriter CeCe Peniston, released on December 30, 1991 by A&M Records as the second single from her debut album, Finally (1992). The song was co-written by Chantay Savage and produced by Steve "Silk" Hurley, and became the second number-one hit for the artist, remaining on the top of the US Billboard Hot Dance Music/Club Play chart for two weeks. In the United Kingdom, the title scored number six, while on the Billboard Hot 100, it reached number twenty. The song contains a sample of the drum break from "Rock with You" by Michael Jackson.

== Critical reception ==
Larry Flick of Billboard magazine wrote, "Duplicating the magic of the now-classic club anthem 'Finally' was a seemingly impossible task. However, with the aid of producer Steve "Silk" Hurley, Peniston has come pretty darn close on this delicious pop/houser, on which she exudes immeasurable charm and the sass of a diva." A reviewer from Cash Box described the song as an "uptempo, club-oriented song that resembles her previous single, but still has a sound of its own."

Matthew Cole from Music Week's RM Dance Update felt that it sees her "sunshine vocals" given the Steve "Silk" Hurley treatment, adding, "The result is sheer smoothness. The song has none of 'Finally''s irresistible cutesy charm, but CeCe's vocal once more refines everything that makes you want to dance." Stuart Maconie from New Musical Express found that "this has aspirations to being a very good record, chiefly by virtue of a brilliantly cheesy tooting (technical term) horn sound and crappy Bontempi organ doodlings."

== Retrospective response ==
In a 2017 retrospective review, Steven E. Flemming Jr. of Albumism stated that the song "skillfully melded the insistent grace of all that’s right about dance production values with grand vocals." AllMusic editor Craig Lytle remarked that "We Got a Love Thang," like "Finally", "employ that rapid dancehall groove better known as house music." In a 2014 review, Pop Rescue described it as "perfectly up-beat."

== Credits and personnel ==
Management

- Executive producers – Manny Lehman, Mark Mazzetti
- Recording studio – Tanglewood Studios, Chicago, Illinois
- Publishing – Last Song
- Administration – Third Coast Music (ASCAP)

Production

- Writers – Eric Miller, Jeremiah McAllister, Chantay Savage (as Chanté)
- Producers – Steven Hurley (as "Silk"); Miller (as "E-Smoove") and Maurice Joshua (remix)
- Mixing and arrangement – Hurley
- Remixing – Hurley, Miller, Joshua (also edits)
- Engineering – Larry Sturm; Hurley and Miller (remix)

Personnel

- Vocals – Cecilia Peniston
- Backing vocals – Savage, Kimberly Russell (as Kym Sims), Donell Rush (as Darnnel)
- Keyboards – Hurley and McAllister (as Jere "Jam") (remix)
- Drum programming – Hurley (remix)
- Cover art – Simon Fowler, Peggy Sirota
- Design – Sarah Southin, Len Peltier

== Track listings and formats ==
- VHS, US, Promo, #(–)
1. "We Got a Love Thang" (Hurley's Silky 7") - 4:30
- 7", US, #75021 1594 7
1. "We Got a Love Thang" (Hurley's Silky 7") - 4:30
2. "Finally" (LP Version) - 4:03
- 7", US, #AM-8720
1. "We Got a Love Thang" (LP Version) - 5:27
2. "Finally" (7" Mix) - 4:30
- 7", DE, #AM 846/390 846-7
- 7", EU & UK, #AM 846/390 846-7
- CD, FR, #390 702-2
1. "We Got a Love Thang" (Silky 7") - 3:45
2. "We Got a Love Thang" (LP Edit) - 3:49
- CS, NL, #300179-4
- CS, US, #75021 1594 4
1. "We Got a Love Thang" (Silky 7") - 3:45
2. "We Got a Love Thang" (LP Version) - 5:27
- CD, AU, #390 680-2
1. "We Got a Love Thang" (Silky House Thang) - 6:58
2. "We Got a Love Thang" (LP Edit) - 3:49
- MCD, DE, #AMCD 846/390 846-2
- MCD, EU & UK, #AMCD 846/390 846-2
1. "We Got a Love Thang" (Silky 7") - 3:45
2. "We Got a Love Thang" (Silky House Thang) - 6:58
3. "We Got a Love Thang" (E-Smoove Groovy Mix) - 6:25
4. "We Got a Love Thang" (LP Edit) - 3:49
- 12", US, #75021 2395 1
- MCD, US, #75021 2395 2
1. "We Got a Love Thang" (Silky House Thang) - 6:58
2. "We Got a Love Thang" (Silky Dub Thang) - 4:23
3. "We Got a Love Thang" (Hurley's Silky 7") - 4:30
4. "We Got a Love Thang" (Maurice 12") - 7:14
5. "We Got a Love Thang" (E-Smoove Groovy Mix) - 6:25
6. "We Got a Love Thang" (LP Version) - 5:27
- 12", NL, #390 846-1
- 12", UK, #AMY 846/390 846-1
- 12", UK, Promo, #AMYDJ 846/390 846-1
1. "We Got a Love Thang" (Silky House Thang) - 6:58
2. "We Got a Love Thang" (E-Smoove Groovy Mix) - 6:25
3. "We Got a Love Thang" (Maurice 12") - 7:14
4. "We Got a Love Thang" (Silky 7") - 3:45
5. "We Got a Love Thang" (LP Edit) - 3:49
6. "We Got a Love Thang" (Silky Dub Thang) - 4:23
7. "We Got a Love Thang" (E-Smoove Dub) - 6:37
- 12", US, Double, Promo, #75021 7328 1
1. "We Got a Love Thang" (Silky House Thang) - 6:58
2. "We Got a Love Thang" (Silky Dub Thang) - 4:23
3. "We Got a Love Thang" (Hurley's Silky 7") - 4:30
4. "We Got a Love Thang" (LP Version) - 5:27
5. "We Got a Love Thang" (Maurice 12") - 7:14
6. "We Got a Love Thang" (Maurice's Dub) - 7:17
7. "We Got a Love Thang" (E-Smoove Groovy Mix) - 6:25
8. "We Got a Love Thang" (E-Smoove Dub) - 6:37
- MCD, US, Promo, #75021 7330 2
1. "We Got a Love Thang" (Hurley's Silky 7") - 4:30
2. "We Got a Love Thang" (LP Edit II) - 4:11
3. "We Got a Love Thang" (Maurice's 7") - 4:32
4. "We Got a Love Thang" (LP Version) - 5:27
5. "We Got a Love Thang" (Silky House Thang) - 6:58
6. "We Got a Love Thang" (Maurice 12") - 7:14
7. "We Got a Love Thang" (E-Smoove Groovy Mix) - 6:25
8. "We Got a Love Thang" (Silky Dub Thang) - 4:23
9. "We Got a Love Thang" (Maurice's Dub) - 7:17
10. "We Got a Love Thang" (E-Smoove Dub) - 6:37

== Charts ==
=== Weekly charts ===
Chart (1992)	Peak position
Australia (ARIA)	36
Belgium (VRT Top 30)	30
Belgium (Ultratop 50 Flanders)	5
Canada Top Singles (RPM)	26
Canada Dance/Urban (RPM)	1
Europe (Eurochart Hot 100)	15
Europe (European Dance Radio)	2
Germany (Media Control Charts)	41
Ireland (IRMA)	15
Netherlands (Dutch Top 40)	4
Netherlands (Single Top 100)	9
New Zealand (RIANZ)	33
Quebec (ADISQ)	18
Sweden (Sverigetopplistan)	34
UK Singles (OCC)	6
UK Airplay (Music Week)	7
UK Dance (Music Week)	3
UK Club Chart (Music Week)	2
US Billboard Hot 100	20
US Dance Club Songs (Billboard)	1
US Dance Singles Sales (Billboard)	1
US Hot R&B/Hip-Hop Songs (Billboard)	38
US Cash Box Top 100	19

=== Year-end charts ===
Chart (1992)	Peak position
American Top 40	79
Dutch Top 100 Singles (Nederlandse Top 40)	79
Europe (European Dance Radio)	18
UK Singles (OCC)	85
UK Club Chart (Music Week)	31
US Top Pop Singles (Billboard)	97
US Top Dance Music Club Play (Billboard)	16

== See also ==
- List of number-one dance singles of 1992 (U.S.)
- List of UK top-ten singles in 1992
- Now That's What I Call Music! 21
- The Best Dance Album in the World... Ever!
