= Felipe Delgado (music producer) =

American songwriter, record producer

- Also known as: DJ Wax Dawg; Waxx; WaxxGado; Waxxxanova Muzik; OGWaxx; ChiWaxx
- Born: Felipe Trio Delgado; April 6, 1969 (age 57)
- Origin: Chicago, Illinois, U.S
- Genres: R&B; hip hop; house; drum & bass
- Occupations: DJ; songwriter; producer
- Years active: 1987–present
- Labels: A&M (1989-1993); Wax Museum (1990–present); Heat City (1995–present)

Felipe "Waxx" Delgado (born April 6, 1969) is an American DJ, songwriter and producer from the south side of Chicago, Illinois, later based in Phoenix, Arizona. Primarily known for his work with house music/R&B diva, CeCe Peniston, he is also known as a founder and pioneer of Arizona hip hop/R&B and dance, and for his collaborative works with fellow Chicago producer and friend Rodney K. Jackson. In 1990, he founded the Wax Museum Productions (originally Wax Museum Music BMI), and co-founded Heat City Records with Jackson in 1995. In spring 2013, Delgado was contacted by TV One executives to appear in an hour-long episode of Unsung covering Peniston's legendary music career. The episode aired on November 27, 2013 for Unsung's 6th season.

== Career ==
He scored an international success in the early 1990s with songs recorded with singer CeCe Peniston, whose initial single "Finally" topped the US Billboard Hot Dance Music/Club Play chart and peaked at number #2 in the UK Top 75, having sold over 3 million copies worldwide. The composition earned several music awards, including the Billboard Music Awards, ASCAP Awards, Annual Winter Music Conference Awards and the BMI Urban Award of Achievement. In 2000, Finally was ranked as the 29th out of 100 Greatest Dance Songs of All Time at VH1's five-part series hosted by Paula Abdul.

Amongst other, he collaborated also with Ice Cube (as a co-producer of the Hardcore's self-titled single "Hardcore/Servin em well", released in 1987) In 1990 he landed a production deal with A&M Records to manage and produce a rapper called Overweight Pooch (whose composition "I Like It" charted at number #16 on the US Dance and #58 on the UK Top 75), contributed to Malaika's singles "So Much Love" (#5 on the US Dance) and "Break It Down", as well as produced several indie records for local Phoenix's artists such as P.D.F. Crew, MC-J Witt, Marvelous JC, MC Leethal, The Weirdoz, LV Sharp, Ditta Don Juan and others.

From 2012 to 2018, Delgado was assistant music director of The Beatlocker Show on KNRJ (101.1 The Beat) in Phoenix Arizona by Founder, Host, and long time friend, Alafia "Pokafase" Long. Delgado responsibilities consisted of, submitting local artist's music, bookings for in studio interviews, Beatlocker Live events, and editing, mastering various artist's music for potential airplay. In 2014 while in Tucson Arizona, Delgado discovered that The Beat's wavelengths reached to Arizona's 2nd largest city, 113 miles southeast of Phoenix, where he submitted various artists of Tucson's best Hip Hop and R&B acts like, The Kennedy's, Swindoe, The Tu, Tora Woloshin, Greedy Green & Cash Lansky to name a few.

== Discography ==
Production

Albums

Year	Title	Artist	Role
1991	Female Preacher	Overweight Pooch	co-writer, producer
1992	Finally	CeCe Peniston	co-writer, producer, programming
1993	Sugar Time	Malaika	programming

Singles & EPs

Year	Title	Artist	Role
1987	"Hardcore"	Hardcore	co-producer
1988	"Servin' em Well"	Hardcore	co-producer
1989	"Do It"/"Drop the Bass"	P.D.F. Crew	co-writer, producer
1990	"Get wit It"	MC-J Witt	producer
1990	"Trim Hunter"/"Get a Grip"	Marvelous JC	producer, beats and cuts
1990	"Sticks & Stones"	Marvelous JC	co-producer, beats programming, scratches
1991	"Ace Is a Spade"	Overweight Pooch	co-writer, producer
1991	"I Like It"	Overweight Pooch featuring CeCe Peniston	co-writer, producer
1991	"Finally	CeCe Peniston	co-writer, producer
1992	"Hitmix"/"It Should Have Been You"	CeCe Peniston	co-writer, producer, programming
1993	"So Much Love"	Malaika	programming
1995	"Break It Down"	Malaika	additional remixer
1995	"Everyday (Everywhere)"/"Weird Thang"	The Weirdoz	producer, executive producer
2007	"Still I"	CeCe Peniston	co-writer, producer
2013	"I Luv You"	LV Sharp	producer, arranger
2018	"Labels"	Ditta Don Juan	producer, arranger
2019	"Legal Trappin"	Dottie Staxx	producer

== Gallery ==
In 1991, at Chaton Studios recording with CeCe Peniston her debut album.	In 1993, after receiving a BMI Award for the single "Finally".	In 2007, also with Peniston at Chaton Studios, during "Still I" session.

== See also ==
- List of record producers
- List of number-one dance hits (United States)
- List of artists who reached number one on the US Dance chart
