= Malaika (singer) =

American singer

- Born: Malaika LeRae Sallard; January 2, 1972 (age 54); Seattle, Washington, U.S.
- Other name: Malaika Sallard Johnson
- Occupations: Singer; songwriter
- Years active: 1991–1996
- Musical career
- Genres: Dance-pop; R&B; soul; urban
- Instrument: Vocals
- Labels: A&M (1992–93); Vestry (1995)

Malaika (born Malaika LeRae Sallard, January 2, 1972, in Seattle, Washington) also known under name Malaika Sallard Johnson, is a female African American dance singer from Seattle, Washington. During her short lived music career she recorded only one album entitled Sugar Time, which managed two Top 5 hits on the US Billboard Hot Dance Music/Club Play chart, including her number #1 single, "Gotta Know (Your Name)" in 1993.

Sallard is tied with another A&M recording artist, CeCe Peniston, who took her own chances by performing backup vocals on the Overweight Pooch's album record Female Preacher in 1991, originally intended for Malaika.

== Discography ==
=== Albums ===
Year	Title
1993	Sugar Time: Release date: June 8, 1993; Record label: A&M Records; Formats: LP, CD, CS

=== Singles ===
Year	Title	Peak chart positions								Album
Year	Title	CAN	UK	USA						Album
Year	Title	CAN	UK	Dance		R&B/ Hip-Hop		Hot 100		Album
Year	Title	CD	UK	CP	SS	Air	100	Air	100	Album
1992	"So Much Love"	6	—	5	27	—	—	55	102	Sugar Time
1993	"Gotta Know (Your Name)"	—	68	1	17	48	68	74	120	Sugar Time
1995	"Break It Down"	—	—	—	—	—	—	—	—	non-album single
"—" denotes a single that did not chart or was not released in that region.

=== Other contributions ===
Year	Title	Role
1992	"You Win, I Win, We Lose" (on Finally by CeCe Peniston)	background vocal

== See also ==
- List of number-one dance hits (United States)
- List of artists who reached number one on the US Dance chart
