= So Much Love (Malaika song) =

Single by Malaika

from the album Sugar Time
- B-side: "Remix"
- Released: 1992
- Recorded: 1992
- Genre: House; dance-pop
- Length: 3:58
- Label: A&M
- Songwriters: D'Mosis; Malaika; Rodney Jackson
- Producer: Jackson

Malaika singles chronology
"So Much Love" (1992)	"Gotta Know (Your Name)" (1993)

Audio sample
- "So Much Love": file; help

"So Much Love" is a song and the debut single by African American dance music singer Malaika, released on A&M Records in 1992. The composition, written by the singer herself, D'Mosis and Rodney K. Jackson, was the lead single of her only album released to date, Sugar Time (1993). The song charted at number five on the US Billboard Hot Dance Music/Club Play chart and at number six on the Canadian Dance/Urban Singles Chart.

== Credits and personnel ==
- Malaika – lead vocals, writer
- D'Mosis – writer,
- Rodney K. Jackson – writer, producer
- Felipe Delgado - programming
- David Morales - additional producer, remix

== Track listings ==
- 12" Maxi, UK, AMX 0084
1. "So Much Love (Techno Mix)" - 5:51
2. "So Much Love (Original Mix)" - 6:46
3. "So Much Love (Bassman Mix)" - 5:52
- 12" Maxi, US, Promo, 31458 8034-1
- 12" Maxi, US, Promo, Test Pressing, 31458 8034-1
1. "So Much Love (Bassman Mix)" - 5:52
2. "So Much Love (Original Mix)" - 6:46
3. "So Much Love (Techno Mix)" - 5:51
- 12" Maxi, UK & Europe, AMY 0084/580084-1
- 12" Maxi, UK & Europe, Promo, AMYDJ 0084/580 0084-1
1. "So Much Love (12" Remix)" - 7:36
2. "So Much Love (12" Choice Mix)" - 7:23
3. "So Much Love (Classic Dub)" - 7:00
4. "So Much Love (Dub Mix)" - 6:12
- CD Maxi, US, Promo, 31458 8034-2
1. "So Much Love (Radio Mix)" - 4:09
2. "So Much Love (Choice Radio Mix)" - 4:12
3. "So Much Love (Original Radio Remix)" - 3:56
4. "So Much Love (12" Remix)" - 7:36
5. "So Much Love (12" Choice Mix)" - 7:23
- CD Maxi, UK, AMCD 084/580 084-2
1. "So Much Love (12" Remix Edit)" - 3:58
2. "So Much Love (12" Remix)" - 7:38
3. "So Much Love (Choice 7")" - 4:27
4. "So Much Love (Choice 12")" - 7:23
5. "So Much Love (Classic Dub)" - 7:00
6. "So Much Love (Dub Mix)" - 6:14
- 12" Maxi, US, 31458 0071-1
1. "So Much Love (12" Remix)" - 7:36
2. "So Much Love (Dub Mix)" - 6:12
3. "So Much Love (Radio Mix)" - 4:09
4. "So Much Love (12" Choice Mix)" - 7:23
5. "So Much Love (Classic Instrumental)" - 6:55
6. "So Much Love (Techno Mix)" - 5:51
- 12" Maxi, US, Double, 31458 8034-1
1. "So Much Love (12" Remix)" - 7:36
2. "So Much Love (Dub Mix)" - 6:12
3. "So Much Love (12" Choice Mix)" - 7:23
4. "So Much Love (Classic Instrumental)" - 6:55
5. "So Much Love (Bassman Mix)" - 5:52
6. "So Much Love (Original Mix)" - 6:46
7. "So Much Love (Techno Mix)" - 5:51

== Charts ==
=== Weekly charts ===
Chart (1993)	Peak position
Canada Dance/Urban (RPM)	6
UK Dance (Music Week)	12
UK Club Chart (Music Week)	8
US Bubbling Under Hot 100 (Billboard)	2
US Hot 100 Airplay (Billboard)	55
US Hot Dance Music/Club Play (Billboard)	5
US Hot Dance Music/Maxi-Singles Sales (Billboard)	27

=== Year-end charts ===
Chart (1992)	Position
UK Club Chart (Music Week)	88
