= Gotta Know (Your Name) =

Single by Malaika

from the album Sugar Time
- B-side: "Remix"
- Released: 1993
- Recorded: 1993
- Genre: House; dance-pop
- Length: 3:32
- Label: A&M
- Songwriter(s): Eric Miller; Jamie Principle; Steve Hurley; Tommye Miller
- Producer(s): Hurley; Todd Terry; Davide Ruberto; Gio; Mark Lewis

Malaika singles chronology
"So Much Love" (1992)	"Gotta Know (Your Name)" (1993)	"Break It Down" (1995)

Audio sample
- "Gotta Know (Your Name)": file; help

Music video
- "Gotta Know (Your Name)" on YouTube

"Gotta Know (Your Name)" is a 1993 song by Malaika, released on A&M Records.

The composition was written by Eric Miller, Jamie Principle, Steve Hurley and Tommye Miller, and released as the second single from the singer's debut album Sugar Time. The single became a number #1 dance hit on the US Billboard Hot Dance Music/Club Play, and charted at number sixty-eight on the US R&B as well as in the UK Top 75.

== Credits and personnel ==
- Malaika – lead vocals
- Eric Miller – writer
- Jamie Principle – writer
- Steve Hurley – writer, producer
- Tommye Miller – writer
- Todd Terry - additional producer, remix
- Davide Ruberto - additional producer, remix
- Gio - additional producer, remix
- Mark Lewis - additional producer, remix
- Maurice Joshua - remix
- Bill Katt - remix engineer

== Track listings ==
CD Maxi, UK, 580 273-2

1. "Gotta Know (Your Name)" (7" Radio Mix) - 3:32
2. "Gotta Know (Your Name)" (Gotta Know Mix) - 4:31
3. "Gotta Know (Your Name)" (House Mix) - 5:17
4. "Gotta Know (Your Name)" (Hip Hop Mix) - 4:04
5. "Gotta Know (Your Name)" (Late Night Mix) - 6:50
6. "Gotta Know (Your Name)" (Tribal Mix) - 6:04

12" Maxi, UK, 580 273-1

1. "Gotta Know (Your Name)" (LP Version) - 3:59
2. "Gotta Know (Your Name)" (House Version) - 5:15
3. "Gotta Know (Your Name)" (Hip Hop Mix) - 4:04
4. "Gotta Know (Your Name)" (Vocal Remix) -
5. "Gotta Know (Your Name)" (Late Night Mix) - 6:50
6. "Gotta Know (Your Name)" (Tribal Mix) - 6:04

12" Maxi, UK, Promo, AMYDJ 273

1. "Gotta Know (Your Name)" (LP Version) - 3:59
2. "Gotta Know (Your Name)" (Gotta Know Mix) - 4:31
3. "Gotta Know (Your Name)" (Hip Hop Mix) - 4:04
4. "Gotta Know (Your Name)" (House Version) - 5:15
5. "Gotta Know (Your Name)" (Underground Jam) - 7:41
6. "Gotta Know (Your Name)" (Rubber Dub) - 5:13

12" Maxi, US, 31458 8135-1

1. "Gotta Know (Your Name)" (House Version) - 5:15
2. "Gotta Know (Your Name)" (Maurice's Mix) - 7:42
3. "Gotta Know (Your Name)" (Dub Version) - 5:13
4. "Gotta Know (Your Name)" (Rubber Dub) - 5:13
5. "Gotta Know (Your Name)" (Oh My Instrumental) - 7:07
6. "Gotta Know (Your Name)" (Underground Jam) - 7:41

12" Maxi, US, 31458 0255-1

1. "Gotta Know (Your Name)" (Gotta Know Mix) - 4:31
2. "Gotta Know (Your Name)" (House Version) - 5:15
3. "Gotta Know (Your Name)" (LP Version) - 3:59
4. "Gotta Know (Your Name)" (Rubber Dub) - 5:13
5. "Gotta Know (Your Name)" (Maurice's Mix) - 7:42
6. "Gotta Know (Your Name)" (Underground Jam) - 7:41

12" Maxi, US, Double, 31458 8135-1
12" Maxi, US, Double, Promo, 31458 8135-1

1. "Gotta Know (Your Name)" (Gotta Know Mix) - 4:31
2. "Gotta Know (Your Name)" (CD Mix) - 4:30
3. "Gotta Know (Your Name)" (LP Version) - 3:59
4. "Gotta Know (Your Name)" (R&B Version) - 4:26
5. "Gotta Know (Your Name)" (Hip Hop Mix) - 4:04
6. "Gotta Know (Your Name)" (Instrumental) - 4:22
7. "Gotta Know (Your Name)" (House Version) - 5:15
8. "Gotta Know (Your Name)" (Maurice's Mix) - 7:42
9. "Gotta Know (Your Name)" (Dub Version) - 5:13
10. "Gotta Know (Your Name)" (Rubber Dub) - 5:13
11. "Gotta Know (Your Name)" (Oh My Instrumental) - 7:07
12. "Gotta Know (Your Name)" (Underground Jam) - 7:41

== Charts ==
=== Peak chart positions ===
Chart (1993)	Peak position
UK Singles Chart	68
U.S. Billboard Hot Dance Music/Club Play	1
U.S. Billboard Hot Dance Music/Maxi-Singles Sales	17
U.S. Billboard Hot R&B/Hip-Hop Songs	68
U.S. Billboard Hot 100 Airplay	74
U.S. Billboard Bubbling Under Hot 100	20

=== Year-end charts ===
Chart (1993)	Position
1993 Hot Dance Music/Club Play Singles	24

== See also ==
- List of number-one dance singles of 1993 (U.S.)
