= Finally (CeCe Peniston album) =

1992 album

Studio album by CeCe Peniston
- Released: January 30, 1992
- Genre: Pop soul
- Length: 48:58
- Label: A&M
- Producers: Daniel Abraham; Felipe Delgado; Steve Hurley; Rodney K. Jackson; Steve Lindsey; Brian Malouf; David Morales; DeVante Swing

CeCe Peniston chronology
Finally (1992)	Finally / We Got a Love Thang: Remix Collection (1992)

Singles from Finally
- 1. "Finally" Released: September 30, 1991; 2. "We Got a Love Thang" Released: January 12, 1992; 3. "Keep On Walkin'" Released: May 5, 1992; 4. "Inside That I Cried" Released: September 11, 1992 (US); 5. "Crazy Love" Released: December 8, 1992 (US)

Finally is the debut album by American singer CeCe Peniston, released on January 30, 1992, by A&M Records. Prior to the release of this album, Peniston released her debut single "Finally", which topped the US Billboard Hot Dance Music Club Play chart on October 26, 1991, peaking eventually at number five on the Billboard Hot 100 and at number two in the UK Singles Chart. The album yielded two additional singles which achieved dance number one status in the US; "We Got a Love Thang", co-written by Chantay Savage, and "Keep On Walkin'", written in collaboration with Kym Sims. Both songs entered the UK Singles Chart top 10 and the Billboard Hot 100 top 20 in the US. Despite the success of the singles, the album itself climbed only to number seventy on the US Billboard 200. However, during its thirty-six weeks long presence in the chart it sold over 554,000 copies in the US. The album peaked at number ten on the UK Albums Chart. The total worldwide sales of the album surpassed 3,000,000 units. Two further tracks were released from the album which were more in the R&B field; "Inside That I Cried" charted at number ten in the US R&B chart and at number forty-two in the UK, while "Crazy Love" peaked at number thirty-one in the US and at number forty-four in the UK. The album was part of the resurgence of dance music in the United States during the mid-1990s.

== Critical reception ==
Professional ratings
Review scores
Source	Rating
AllMusic	4/5 stars
Calgary Herald	C
Encyclopedia of Popular Music	3/5 stars
Entertainment Weekly	B−
Los Angeles Times	3/4 stars
Music Week	3/5 stars

Finally received generally mixed to positive reviews from music critics. Craig Lytle from AllMusic lauded the album in his review as "outstanding", and it being a "solidly produced collection". Giving the set four out of five stars, he wrote that the album warranted an additional single release. Amy Linden from Entertainment Weekly stated that Peniston has "a good enough voice" (which she stressed as a novelty among dance-music dollies), but apart from its title single, plus the funky ode "Virtue", she ranked the rest of album a B− for being "mainly standard issue and pretty dull". Elena Oumano from Los Angeles Times wrote, "Like Patti LaBelle, CeCe Peniston scales a broad range of vocal peaks with electrifying ease, but where LaBelle stoops to played-out histrionics, Peniston’s operatic soul vibrates with freewheeling, youthful gusto on this debut album. While this exuberance works best when matched to a hammering house mix, Peniston’s heroic gymnastics ring genuine even in ballads. She just seems to feel more than ordinary folk. But that astonishing voice demands exceptional material; “Lifeline” and other pedestrian vehicles seem all the weaker for Peniston’s formidable gift."

== Accolades ==
Finally was nominated for Best R&B/Soul Album – Female at the 1993 Soul Train Music Awards, but lost to What's the 411? by Mary J. Blige.

== Chart performance ==
Initially, Finally entered the albums charts overseas. On February 2, 1992, the album debuted in the UK Albums Chart at number ten, its peak, spending nineteen weeks in total on the chart. On February 15, the album appeared for the first time in the Canadian Albums Chart at number sixty, as well as on the US Billboard 200 at number ninety-nine. In both countries, the album reached its peak position in its fourth week on the chart; number twenty in Canada, where it spent twenty-two weeks in the chart, and number seventy in the US, where it spent thirty-six weeks on the chart, of which eighteen were within the Top 100. In the Dutch MegaCharts, the album began its twelve-week run on February 22 at number ninety, reaching number thirty-one. In Billboard's component chart, the album debuted on the R&B/Hip-Hop chart on March 7 at number eighty-eight, and climbed to number thirteen on August 8, spending fifty-two weeks in the chart. In addition, the album charted for two weeks in Austria, peaking there at number thirty-eight, its debut, on March 8.

== Track listing ==
Finally track listing
No.	Title	Writer(s)	Producer(s)	Length
1.	"We Got a Love Thang"	Eric Miller; Jeremiah McAllister; Chantay Savage	Steve "Silk" Hurley	5:29
2.	"Finally"	CeCe Peniston; Felipe Delgado; Rodney K. Jackson; E.L. Linnear	Delgado; Jackson; David Morales^{[a]}	4:03
3.	"Inside That I Cried"	Jackson; Malik Byrd; Otto D'Agnolo	Steve Lindsey	5:51
4.	"Lifeline"	George Lyter; Michael O'Hara; Denise Rich	Morales	4:52
5.	"It Should Have Been You"	Darryl Thompson	Delgado; Jackson	5:50
6.	"Keep On Walkin'"	Hurley; Marc Williams; Kym Sims	Hurley	4:30
7.	"Crazy Love"	George Lyter; Michael O'Hara; Denise Rich	Daniel Abraham	4:48
8.	"I See Love"	Byron Drew Counts	DeVante Swing; Darryl Pearson^{[a]}	4:46
9.	"You Win, I Win, We Lose"	Jackson; Danny Moore	Delgado; Jackson; Rusty D'Agnolo^{[a]}; Brian Malouf^{[a]}	4:02
10.	"Virtue"	Delgado; Moore; Jackson	Delgado; Jackson; Gail "Sky" King^{[a]}	4:47
Total length:				48:58

UK double vinyl edition bonus tracks
No.	Title	Writer(s)	Producer(s)	Length
11.	"Finally" (12″ Choice Mix)	Peniston; Delgado; Jackson; Linnear	Delgado; Jackson; Morales^{[a]}	7:04
12.	"Finally" (12″ Original Mix)	Peniston; Delgado; Jackson; Linnear	Delgado; Jackson; Morales^{[a]}	7:04
13.	"Finally" (7″ Choice Mix)	Peniston; Delgado; Jackson; Linnear	Delgado; Jackson; Morales^{[a]}	4:08
14.	"Finally" (Somedub Mix)	Peniston; Delgado; Jackson; Linnear	Delgado; Jackson; Morales^{[a]}	7:07
15.	"Finally" (Momo Dub Mix)	Peniston; Delgado; Jackson; Linnear	Delgado; Jackson; Morales^{[a]}	7:04
16.	"Finally" (Journey Mix)	Peniston; Delgado; Jackson; Linnear	Delgado; Jackson; Morales^{[a]}	7:02

1992 UK CD and CS edition bonus track
No.	Title	Writer(s)	Producer(s)	Length
11.	"Finally" (Somedub Mix)	Peniston; Delgado; Jackson; Linnear	Delgado; Jackson; Morales^{[a]}	7:07

1997 UK reissue bonus track
No.	Title	Writer(s)	Producer(s)	Length
11.	"Finally" (Classic Funk Radio Mix)	Peniston; Delgado; Jackson; Linnear	Delgado; Jackson; Morales^{[a]}	3:26

Notes

- ^{^[a]} signifies an additional producer

== Personnel ==
Technical

- Producers: Daniel Abraham, Felipe Delgado, R.K. Jackson, Steve Lindsey, Brian Malouf, David Morales, DeVante Swing
- Engineers: Craig Marcus, Tony Maserati, Rob Paustian, John Poppo, Larry Stur
- Assistant engineers: Lolly Grodner
- Mixing: Daniel Abraham, Terry Burrus, David Morales, DeVante Swing, Elliot Peters
- Re-mixing: Brian Malouf

Performers and musicians

- Arrangers: Steve Lindsey, DeVante Swing
- Vocal arrangements: Danny Madden
- Drums: Ed Greene
- Percussion: Lenny Castro, Bashiri Johnson, David Morales, Steve Lindsey
- Drum programming: Felipe Delgado, R.K. Jackson, Peter "Ski" Schwartz
- Keyboards, synthesizers: John Barnes, Robbie Buchanan, Terry Burrus, Claude Gaudette, Khris Kellow, Eric Kupper, Steve Lindsey, Peter "Ski" Schwartz
- Guitars: Charles Fearing, Grant Geissman, Dean Parks
- Saxophone: Brandon Fields

== Charts ==
Chart performance for Finally
Chart (1992)	Peak position
Australian Albums (ARIA)	95
Austrian Albums (Ö3 Austria)	38
Canada Top Albums/CDs (RPM)	20
Dutch Albums (Album Top 100)	31
UK Albums (Official Charts)	10
US Billboard 200	70
US Top R&B/Hip-Hop Albums (Billboard)	13

== Promo EP ==
The Heart & Soul of CeCe Peniston (Four Selections from Finally)

EP by CeCe Peniston
- Released: 1992
- Recorded: 1991
- Genres: Dance, R&B
- Length: 18:06
- Label: A&M
- Producers: Steve Hurley, Daniel Abraham, DeVanté Swing, Felipe Delgado, Rodney K. Jackson

Along with the release of Peniston's single "Keep On Walkin'", a four-track promo EP titled The Heart and Soul of CeCe Peniston (Four Selections from Finally) was issued in the United States in support of Finally.

Apart from her third US Dance number-one hit "Keep On Walkin'", the EP also featured "Crazy Love", which was also promoted with a single, as well as two other songs from Finally—"I See Love", and "You Win, I Win, We Lose" (with background vocals by Malaika).

The artwork of the EP included altered pictures on its front and back cover.

=== Track listing ===
No.	Title	Writer(s)	Length
1.	"Keep On Walkin'"	Steve Hurley, Marc Williams, Kym Sims	4:30
2.	"Crazy Love"	George Lyter, Michael O'Hara, Denise Rich	4:48
3.	"I See Love"	Byron Drew Counts	4:46
4.	"You Win, I Win, We Lose"	Rodney K. Jackson, Danny Moore	4:02
Total length:			18:06

=== Personnel ===
- CeCe Peniston – lead vocals
- Steve Hurley – production
- Daniel Abraham – production
- DeVanté Swing – production, arrangement
- Darryl Pearson – co-production, arrangement
- Felipe Delgado – production
- Rodney K. Jackson – production
- Rusty D'Agnolo – additional production, engineering
- Brian Malouf – additional production, remixing
- Larry Sturm – engineering
- Tony Maserati – engineering
- Lolly Grodner – engineering assistance

Recording details

- Songs recorded and mixed at Tangle Wood Studios, Chicago; Right Track Studios, NYC; Chung King Studios, NYC
- Songs published by Last Song Inc, George You've Got It Music/O'Hara Music/Music Corp (BMI)/IDG (ASCAP), Big Arm Music (ASCAP), and Urban Tracks Music/Mainlot Music (Broadcast Music Incorporated)
- Administration by Third Coast Music (ASCAP)
