= Finally (CeCe Peniston song) =

1991 single by CeCe Peniston

- Cover art for original US editions

Single by CeCe Peniston

from the album Finally
- B-side: "We Got a Love Thang" (remix)
- Released: September 30, 1991
- Genre: House; garage house; pop-soul; R&B
- Length: 4:05 (album version/7-inch mix without rap); 4:09 (7-inch Choice mix)
- Label: A&M
- Songwriters: CeCe Peniston; Felipe Delgado; E.L. Linnear; Rodney Jackson
- Producers: Felipe Delgado; Kelsey

CeCe Peniston singles chronology
"Finally" (1991)	"I Like It" (1991)

Music video
- "Finally" (7-inch mix without rap) on YouTube

"Finally" is a song by American singer-songwriter CeCe Peniston, released in September 1991 by A&M Records as her debut single from her first album of the same name (1992). Co-written by her, it received critical acclaim, becoming Peniston's first (and biggest) hit song, peaking at number five on the US Billboard Hot 100 in January 1992. Prior to that, the track was a major success on the Billboard Dance Club Play chart, where it spent two weeks at number one in late 1991. In addition, a dance remix of the song, the "Choice Mix", peaked at number two on the UK Singles Chart in March 1992. Its accompanying music video was directed by Claude Borenzweig and won an award at the Billboard Music Video Awards. Rolling Stone and Billboard magazines ranked "Finally" among the best pop and dance songs of all time in 2022 and 2023.

== Background and release ==
Peniston grew up in Phoenix and began writing pop songs during school. The words of "Finally" were purportedly penned during a chemistry class, while thinking about dating in college. In 1989 and 1990, she won the Miss Black Arizona pageant, and took the Miss Galaxy pageant a short time later.

Her music career began in January 1991, when Felipe "DJ Wax Dawg" Delgado, her friend and a record producer based also in Phoenix, asked Peniston to record back-up vocals for Tonya Davis, a rapper known as Overweight Pooch. Though Overweight Pooch's album flopped on the market, Manny Lehman (a DJ and executive producer) had noticed the powerful voice of the back-up vocalist, Peniston. He offered Delgado a chance to produce a track for Peniston to cultivate her potential as a solo artist. Delgado called hometown friend and music producer, Rodney K. Jackson, to help co-produce Peniston's single, which would become "Finally".

Peniston was 21 years old when "Finally" was released. When asked about the song in a 2012 interview, Peniston said,

"It was actually a poem that I had turned into a song, and it was the very first song that I had written. I was doing backup for someone else, and they asked if I had something else and I was like yeah, something I've written, and I didn't know if they'd like it. You know, you don't really understand your gifts at that point, so when he said I have a hit, I was just like okay. At the time I didn't understand what it means to have a number one song, I really had no idea. They said you have a hit on your hands and you're going to have to go to Europe. All of a sudden I was traveling the world, one show turned into two, that little girl from Arizona was going everywhere! You know, I had been here and there, a couple of trips, but nothing at all like this. It was overwhelming."

== Composition ==
The remix of this song is based on the piano riff from the house music classic "Someday" by CeCe Rogers from 1987. The song is performed in the key of B minor with a tempo of 120 beats per minute, following a chord progression of G(9) – G/A – Bm, and Peniston's vocals span from B_{3} to D_{5}. In 2017, Peniston told about recording the song,

"It was a great experience making this song. I remember being in the studio with producer Felipe Delgado, and we didn't have the second verse written. I had forgotten some of the lyrics and just ad-libbed some of them–that "yeah-yeah" part. They ended up sampling that, and it became a big part of the song. It's amazing how those raw moments happen."

== Critical reception ==
Upon the release, J.D. Considine from The Baltimore Sun praised the song as "a delightful surprise, marrying a muscular, insinuating groove to Peniston's soulful, insistent vocals." Larry Flick from Billboard magazine complimented it as "a delicious peak-hour houser that is in a vein similar to Alison Limerick's 'Where Love Lives'. Peniston wraps her lovely alto around a hook that seeps into the brain and body and never lets go." He also remarked that Peniston "proves her potential as a future diva on this brain-embedding, spine-stirring house anthem." Amy Linden from Entertainment Weekly commented, "The slammin’ house/pop single of the moment? It's CeCe Peniston's 'Finally,' and its sheer joy and verve." She explained further, "Grooving in the fabulousness of her newfound Mr. Right, and sorta amazed that it all happened, she wails deliciously, making you believe that true love will conquer all and that someday your prince (or princess) will come." Dave Sholin from the Gavin Report described it as a "bright and infectious" debut release and concluded, "I had a preview of this song back in July and have been in love with it ever since!" Dennis Hunt from Los Angeles Times viewed it as "lively".

Pan-European magazine Music & Media stated that "this newcomer gives further evidence that dance is still developing into a more song-oriented direction. The violins give the tune the ambiance of 'Backstabbers' by the O'Jays." Andy Beevers from Music Week complimented it as an "extremely classy and catchy garage-styled debut", naming it Pick of the Week in the category of Dance. A reviewer from People Magazine felt that it's "overflowing with verve and loaded up with joyous girlie glee", noting the "ecstatic, beat-heavy power" of the track. James Hamilton from the Record Mirror Dance Update labeled it as "cheerful wailing" and a "ex–Miss America's catchy Crystal Waters–type US pop smash" in his weekly dance column. Adam Higginbotham from Select declared "Finally" as "a superb slice of feel-good pop music. From its bassline – purloined from Ce Ce (no relation) Rogers' classic garage tune 'Someday' – to the inanely cheery lyrics." Tom Doyle from Smash Hits viewed it as a "rousing house song". Steve Pick from St. Louis Post-Dispatch wrote, "This is a catchy disco number, building energy through repetition of the simple hookline and a solid bass/drum throb. Get on the dance floor to this one, and you'll move."

=== Retrospective response ===
Bill Lamb from About.com featured "Finally" in their list of "The Top 100 Best Party Songs", describing it as an "upbeat, celebratory song about love". Steven E. Flemming, Jr. from Albumism noted that it "skillfully melded the insistent grace of all that’s right about dance production values with grand vocals." AllMusic editor Craig Lytle felt that the song and its follow-up, "We Got a Love Thang", "employ that rapid dancehall groove better known as house music". Stopera and Galindo from BuzzFeed remarked, "When it comes to ‘90s dance songs you’d be hard-pressed to find another song that so perfectly incorporates other music genres that made the decade so great – i.e., R&B, house, and pop – which is what makes “Finally" the quintessential ‘90s dance song. And honestly, it's a feel-good hit! Just try being in a bad mood after listening to it!" A writer from Complex said that "this was the sound of the early 1990s, when everything was turning colorful and bright." Pop Rescue called it "a great track, with that fantastic hand-clap, bassline and piano opening", adding that Peniston's vocals are "sublime".

== Chart performance ==
"Finally" peaked atop the US Billboard Dance Club Play chart for two weeks in October 1991, while achieving respectable chart success overseas the following year. The song was re-released in the United Kingdom in March 1992, when it reached a new peak of number two during its second week on the UK Singles Chart, on March 22. "Finally" also charted at number one in Zimbabwe and on the RPM Dance chart in Canada, as well as at number eight in both Australia and New Zealand. In Europe, the song reached number three in Belgium and number five in Ireland and the Netherlands. In West Asia, it became a top-20 hit in Israel, peaking at number 18 in December 1991.

== Music video ==
A music video was made for "Finally", directed by Claude Borenzweig. It is very simple, showing Peniston performing the song within a variety of shapes and colors, sometimes with a guy dancing.

== Impact and legacy ==
DJ Magazine ranked "Finally" number 64 in their list of "Top 100 Club Tunes" in 1998. VH1 ranked it number 29 in their list of the "100 Greatest Dance Songs" in 2000. MTV Dance ranked the song number 28 in their list of "The 100 Biggest '90s Dance Anthems of All Time" in November 2011. Heart TV ranked "Finally" number three in their list of "55 Biggest '90s Club Classics" in March 2017. Slant Magazine ranked it number 37 in their list of "The 100 Best Dance Songs of All Time" in 2020. The Guardian ranked it number 66 in their "The 70 Greatest No 2 Singles – Ranked!" in 2022. Alexis Petridis wrote, "House music as pure pop-soul, "Finally" was a hymn to an idealised boyfriend sung by a former Miss Black Arizona." Same year, Pitchfork ranked it number 87 in their countdown of "The 250 Best Songs of the 1990s" in 2022. In October 2023, Billboard magazine listed "Finally" number 447 in their "Best Pop Songs of All Time". The magazine praised its "magic moment"; "Peniston sings the word “finally” about 20 times in this song, but it’s lucky no. 13 where she destroys the word on the break, growling it out and turning a song about meeting the man of your dreams from a cloying concept into a hard-won victory cry."

=== Accolades ===
Year	Publisher	Country	Accolade	Rank
1991	The Face	United Kingdom	"Singles of the Year"	5
1998	DJ Magazine	United Kingdom	"Top 100 Club Tunes"	64
2000	VH1	United States	"100 Greatest Dance Songs"	29
2005	Bruce Pollock	United States	"The 7,500 Most Important Songs of 1944–2000"	Unranked
2005	Süddeutsche Zeitung	Germany	"1020 Songs 1955–2005"	Unranked
2011	Max	Australia	"1000 Greatest Songs of All Time"	919
2011	MTV Dance	United Kingdom	"The 100 Biggest 90's Dance Anthems of All Time"	28
2013	Complex	United States	"15 Songs That Gave Dance Music a Good Name"	Unranked
2015	Robert Dimery	United States	"1,001 Songs You Must Hear Before You Die, and 10,001 You Must Download (2015 Update)"	1002
2017	Heart TV	United Kingdom	"55 Biggest '90s Club Classics"	3
2017	BuzzFeed	United States	"The 101 Greatest Dance Songs Of the '90s"	1
2018	About.com	United States	"The Top 100 Best Party Songs of All Time"	60
2019	Billboard	United States	"Billboard's Top Songs of the '90s"	297
2020	Daily Mirror	United Kingdom	"Top 50 Happiest Songs Ever"	23
2020	PopMatters	United States	"15 Landmark Dance Tracks of 1991"	Unranked
2020	Slant Magazine	United States	"The 100 Best Dance Songs of All Time"	37
2022	Billboard	United States	"Best LGBTQ Anthems of All Time"	44
2022	Classic Pop	United Kingdom	"90s Dance – The Essential Playlist"	5
2022	The Guardian	United Kingdom	"The 70 Greatest No 2 Singles – Ranked!"	66
2022	Pitchfork	United States	"The 30 Best House Tracks of the ’90s"	Unranked
2022	Pitchfork	United States	"The 250 Best Songs of the 1990s"	87
2022	Rolling Stone	United States	"200 Greatest Dance Songs of All Time"	83
2022	Time Out	United Kingdom	"The 50 Best Gay Songs to Celebrate Pride All Year Long"	48
2023	Billboard	United States	"Best Pop Songs of All Time"	447
2025	Billboard	United States	"The 100 Greatest LGBTQ+ Anthems of All Time"	77
2025	Billboard	United States	"The 50 Best House Songs of All Time"	21

== Music awards and nominations ==
ASCAP Awards

Year	Award	Result
1992	Song of the Year	Won
1992	Pop Songwriter of the Year	Won
1992	Most Performed Song of the Year	Won

Billboard Music Video Awards

Year	Award	Result
1992	Best Director – Dance (C. Borenzweig)	Won
1992	Best New Artist – Dance	Won
1992	Best Female Artist – Dance	Nominated

BMI Awards

Year	Award	Result
1993	Urban Award of Achievement	Won

VH1 Awards

Year	Award	Result
2000	100 Greatest Dance Songs	Nominated

Winter Music Conference Awards

Year	Award	Result
1992	Best New Dance Artist	Won
1992	Best Dance Artist – Solo	Won
1992	Best 12-inch Dance Record	Won

== Track listings and formats ==
- US cassette single
1. "Finally" (7-inch mix) – 4:27
2. "Finally" (7-inch Choice mix) – 4:08
- US CD single
1. "Finally" (7-inch Choice mix) – 4:08
2. "Finally" (12-inch mix without rap) – 7:07
3. "Finally" (12-inch Choice mix) – 7:04
- US 12-inch and CD maxi-single
1. "Finally" (12-inch mix) – 7:04
2. "Finally" (Momo mix) – 7:02
3. "Finally" (7-inch mix) – 4:27
4. "Finally" (12-inch Choice mix) – 7:04
5. "Finally" (Journey mix) – 7:02
6. "Finally" (7-inch Choice mix) – 4:08
- European and UK 7-inch, CD and cassette French single
1. "Finally" (7-inch Choice mix) – 4:08
2. "Finally" (7-inch mix without rap) – 4:05
- Australian CD and cassette single
1. "Finally" (7-inch Choice mix) – 4:08
2. "Finally" (12-inch Choice mix) – 7:04
- Dutch and UK 7-inch single
1. "Finally" (7-inch Choice mix) – 4:08
2. "Finally" (7-inch PKA mix) – 3:58
- Australian, European and UK 12-inch singles
1. "Finally" (12-inch Choice mix) – 7:04
2. "Finally" (7-inch Choice mix) – 4:08
3. "Finally" (Somedub mix) – 7:07
- UK 12-inch single
1. "Finally" (12-inch Choice mix) – 7:04
2. "Finally" (12-inch PKA mix) – 7:08
3. "We Got a Love Thang" (The Factory Jam) – 7:08
- UK CD single
1. "Finally" (7-inch Choice mix) – 4:08
2. "Finally" (12-inch Choice mix) – 7:04
3. "Finally" (Somedub mix) – 7:07
- European and UK CD maxi-single
1. "Finally" (7-inch Choice mix) – 4:08
2. "Finally" (12-inch Choice mix) – 7:04
3. "Finally" (Somedub mix) – 7:07
4. "Finally" (7-inch mix without rap) – 4:05
- UK CD maxi-single
1. "Finally" (7-inch Choice mix) – 4:08
2. "Finally" (12-inch Choice mix) – 7:04
3. "Finally" (12-inch PKA mix) – 7:08
4. "Finally" (7-inch PKA mix) – 3:58
5. "Finally" (Somedub mix) – 7:07

== Credits and personnel ==
Management

- Executive producers – Manny Lehman, Mark Mazzetti
- Recording studio – Aztec Studios, Phoenix, Arizona
- Publishing – Wax Museum Music, Mainlot Music (BMI), Polygram Music

Production

- Writers – Cecilia Peniston (lyrics), Felipe Delgado, Rodney K. Jackson, and Elbert Lee Linnear (music)
- Producers – Delgado, Rodney Jackson (as R.K. Jackson) (co-producer); David Morales and Philip Kelsey (remix)
- Remixing – Morales, Kelsey
- Engineering – David Sussman; Jed Davis; Kelsey (remix)

Personnel

- Vocals – Peniston
- Percussion – Morales
- Piano – Eric Kupper (acoustic and solo)
- Keyboards – Rodney K. Jackson
- Programming – Delgado
- Cover art – Simon Fowler, Peggy Sirota
- Design – Sarah Southin, Len Peltier

== Charts ==
=== Weekly charts ===
Chart (1991)	Peak position
Canada Dance/Urban (RPM)	1
Europe (European Dance Radio)	5
Europe (European Hit Radio)	40
Israel (Israeli Singles Chart)	18
Quebec (ADISQ)	10
UK Singles (Official Charts)	29
UK Airplay (Music Week)	24
UK Dance (Music Week)	3
UK Club Chart (Record Mirror)	1
US Dance Club Songs (Billboard)	1
US Dance Singles Sales (Billboard)	1

Chart (1992)	Peak position
Australia (ARIA)	8
Austria (Ö3 Austria Top 40)	9
Belgium (Ultratop 50 Flanders)	3
Canada Retail Singles (The Record)	1
Canada Top Singles (RPM)	12
Europe (Eurochart Hot 100)	7
Europe (European Dance Radio)	3
France (SNEP)	39
Germany (GfK)	16
Ireland (IRMA)	5
Netherlands (Dutch Top 40)	6
Netherlands (Single Top 100)	5
New Zealand (Recorded Music NZ)	8
Switzerland (Schweizer Hitparade)	12
UK Singles (Official Charts)	2
UK Airplay (Music Week)	5
UK Dance (Music Week)	4
US Billboard Hot 100	5
US Hot R&B/Hip-Hop Songs (Billboard)	26
US Cash Box Top 100	7
Zimbabwe (ZIMA)	1

=== Year-end charts ===
Chart (1991)	Position
Canada Dance/Urban (RPM)	14
UK Club Chart (Record Mirror)	8
US 12-inch Singles Sales (Billboard)	42
US Dance Club Play (Billboard)	25

Chart (1992)	Position
Australia (ARIA)	99
Belgium (Ultratop 50 Flanders)	49
Brazil (Crowley)	20
Europe (Eurochart Hot 100)	74
Germany (Media Control)	81
Netherlands (Dutch Top 40)	60
Netherlands (Single Top 100)	34
UK Singles (OCC)	48
UK Airplay (Music Week)	47
UK Club Chart (Music Week)	79
US Billboard Hot 100	20
US Maxi-Singles Sales (Billboard)	48

Chart (1997)	Position
UK Club Chart (Music Week)	29

=== Decade-end charts ===
Chart (1990–1999)	Position
Canada (Nielsen SoundScan)	78

== Certifications ==
Region	Certification	Certified units/sales
New Zealand (RMNZ)	Gold	15,000^{‡}
United Kingdom (BPI)	Platinum	600,000^{‡}
United States (RIAA)	Gold	500,000^{^}
^{^} Shipments figures based on certification alone.^{‡} Sales+streaming figures based on certification alone.

== Release history ==
Region	Date	Format(s)	Label(s)	Ref.
United Kingdom	September 30, 1991	7-inch vinyl; 12-inch vinyl; CD; cassette	A&M	
Australia	November 18, 1991	CD; cassette	A&M; Polydor	
United Kingdom (re-release)	March 9, 1992	7-inch vinyl; 12-inch vinyl; CD; cassette	A&M	

== Reissues ==
=== "Finally '97" ===
"Finally '97"

Single by CeCe Peniston

from the album Finally (1997 reissue)
- B-side: "We Got a Love Thang"; "Hit by Love"
- Released: September 1, 1997
- Length: 3:26 (Classic Funk radio mix)
- Label: A&M
- Songwriters: CeCe Peniston; Felipe Delgado; E.L. Linnear; Rodney Jackson
- Producers: Eric Kupper; Sharp

Music video
- "Classic Funk Radio Mix" on YouTube

In 1997, "Finally" was remixed by Eric Kupper to enhance the overseas issue of Peniston's album Finally, which was re-released in Europe and Japan along with her greatest collection, The Best Of CeCe Peniston . The new remixed version of the song titled "Classic Funk Mix" (or "Finally '97") successfully re-entered the British charts, peaking on September 13 at number 26 on the UK Singles Chart, meaning Peniston had three chart entries with one and the same title (in March 92, in September 97).

==== Additional credits ====
- Recording studio – Hysteria Recording
- Publishing – PolyGram Music
- Producer, engineering, programming, keyboards, guitar and bass – Eric Kupper
- Remixing – Kupper, George Mitchell and Steven Doherty (as Sharp)
- Design – Alex

==== Track listings and formats ====
- French CD single
1. "Finally" (Classic Funk Radio Mix) – 3:26
2. "Finally" (Classic Funk Mix) – 7:13
- European CD maxi-single
1. "Finally" (Classic Funk Radio Mix) – 3:26
2. "Finally" (Classic Funk Mix) – 7:13
3. "Finally" (Nasty Funk Mix) – 8:00
4. "Finally" (Nasty Funk Dub) – 5:28
- Italian 12-inch vinyl single
1. "Finally" (Nasty Funk Mix) – 8:00
2. "Finally" (Nasty Funk Dub) – 5:28
3. "Finally" (Classic Funk Mix) – 7:13
4. "Finally" (Classic Funk Radio Mix) – 3:26
- European and UK CD maxi-single (1)
1. "Finally" (Classic Funk Radio Mix) – 3:26
2. "Finally" (Choice' Mix) – 4:09
3. "We Got a Love Thang" (Silky 7-inch) – 4:28
4. "Hit by Love" (LP Version) – 4:34
- European and UK CD maxi-single (2)
1. "Finally" (Classic Funk Radio Mix) – 3:26
2. "Finally" (Classic Funk Mix) – 7:13
3. "Finally" (Nasty Funk Mix) – 8:00
4. "Finally" (Nasty Funk Dub) – 5:28
5. "Finally" (Sharp's System Vocal) – 8:16
6. "Finally" (Sharp's Funky Mirror Ball Dub) – 6:00
- UK 12-inch double vinyl
1. "Finally" (Nasty Funk Mix) – 8:00
2. "Finally" (Sharp's System Vocal) – 8:16
3. "Finally" (Acappella)
4. "Finally" (Nasty Funk Dub) – 5:28
5. "Finally" (Sharp's Funky Mirror Ball Dub) – 6:00
6. "Finally" (Classic Funk Mix) – 7:13
7. "Finally" (12-inch Choice Mix) – 7:05

==== Charts ====
Chart (1997)	Peak position
Europe (Eurochart Hot 100)	79
UK Singles (OCC)	26

=== "Finally 2008" ===
"Finally 2k8"

Promotional single

from the album Mastermix: Pro Dance 08
- Released: 2008
- Length: 7:05
- Label: Bimbo Rock
- Songwriters: CeCe Peniston; Felipe Delgado; E.L. Linnear; Rodney Jackson
- Producers: Kam Denny; Paul Zala

In mid-2008, the song was remixed by Kam Denny, an Australian DJ and producer, and Paul Zala, an electrohouse DJ based in Melbourne. Subtitled as "Kam Denny & Paul Zala Remix", or rather "Vandalism Remix", the promotional single was released in Australia on Bimbo Rock, a local indie dance/electro label formed by TV Rock. The new adaptation gained underground house music popularity and entered the local Club Tracks Chart, topping for four weeks at number one.

==== Additional credits ====
- Producers and remixing – Kam Denny and Paul Zala

==== Charts ====
Weekly charts

Chart (2008)	Peak position
Australian Top 50 Club Tracks	1
US Billboard Global Dance Tracks	33

Year-end charts

Chart (2008)	Position
Australian Top 50 Club Tracks	17

=== "Finally 2011" ===
"Finally 2011"

Single by CeCe Peniston featuring Joyriders
- Released: October 3, 2011
- Length: 2:58 (Roman Hunter airplay mix)
- Label: Perfecto; 16 Bars
- Songwriters: CeCe Peniston; Felipe Delgado; E.L. Linnear; Rodney Jackson
- Producers: Roman Hunter; Digitalchord; Zen Freeman; Remy Le Duc; Tiger Stripes; DJ Cii

Music video
- "Finally" featuring Joyriders on YouTube

For the 20th anniversary of "Finally", Peniston made a number of additional remixes of the song for Paul Oakenfold, featuring Joyriders, and supported also by music video. Originally, the song was to be attached to her cancelled studio album CeCe.

==== Additional credits ====
- Executive producer – Paul Oakenfold
- Vocals – Peniston (re-recorded)
- Performer – Joyriders
- Producers and remixing – Roman Hunter, Digitalchord, Zen Freeman, Remy Le Duc, Mikael Nordgren (as Tiger Stripes), Chuckii Booker (as DJ Cii)
- Vocal production – Kevin Lewis

==== Track listings and formats ====
Release 1

1. "Finally" (Roman Hunter Airplay Mix) – 2:58

Release 2

1. "Finally" (Roman Hunter Remix) – 7:03
2. "Finally" (Digitalchord Remix) – 7:00
3. "Finally" (Zen Freeman & Remy Le Duc Remix) – 6:03
4. "Finally" (Tiger Stripes Remix) – 7:22
5. "Finally" (DJ Cii Remix) – 2:31

Deep House Selection, Volume 6 (The Finest Deep House Tunes)

1. "Finally" (Tiger Stripes Radio Edit) – 3:15

== In popular culture ==
The song features in the 1994 Australian drag-comedy The Adventures of Priscilla, Queen of the Desert, with the main characters lip-synching to the song during a performance.

For her ninth tour Showgirl: The Homecoming Tour that resumed on November 11, 2006, at Sydney Entertainment Centre (ended on January 23, 2007), Kylie Minogue used elements of Peniston's song when performing her 2000 comeback single "Spinning Around", co-written by Paula Abdul.

In July 2014, British singer Matt Fishel included a cover version of the song on his virtual EP Cover Boy. The accompanying video won the category for Best Lyric Video at the 2014 LGBT-based RightOutTV Music & Video Award.

In 2015, the song was also used in an advertisement for Ariel detergent in the Philippines with modified lyrics to promote the product. The commercial has since spawned parodies poking fun at the campy nature of the commercial and the song used, with numerous people and fictional characters lip-syncing to the tune.

== See also ==
- The Best Dance Album in the World... Ever!
- Dance Dance Revolution
- List of number-one dance singles of 1991 (U.S.)
- List of UK top-ten singles in 1992
