= Denise Eisenberg Rich =

American singer-songwriter (born 1944)

Denise Rich
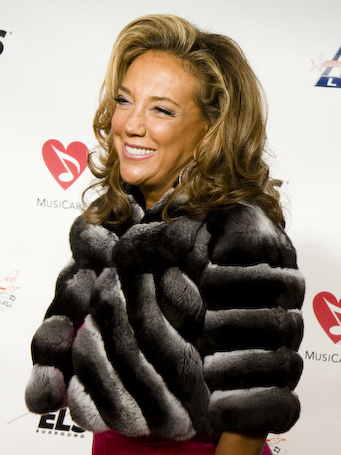
- Rich in 2009
- Born: Denise Eisenberg; January 26, 1944 (age 82); Worcester, Massachusetts, United States
- Other names: Denise Eisenberg Rich; Joy Denny
- Citizenship: Austria (2011–present); United States (1944–2011)
- Occupations: Singer-songwriter, socialite, political fundraiser
- Spouse: Marc Rich (m. 1966; div. 1996)
- Children: 3

Denise Rich (born Eisenberg; January 26, 1944) is an American-born Austrian singer-songwriter, socialite, philanthropist and political fundraiser.

== Early life and education ==
Denise Eisenberg was born and raised in Worcester, Massachusetts, the daughter of Gery (née Diamant) (died 1989) and Emil Eisenberg (December 24, 1912 – June 13, 2003). Emil Eisenberg, the son of Jula and Wolf Eisenberg, was born in Tarnov, Galicia, Austria-Hungary which is now in Poland since the end of World War II. In 1933, her father left Germany for Paris where he and his three brothers Henry, Zigg, and Jack established a fur store with offices also in New York City and London. In 1940, her parents and her sister Monique left Paris for New York City. In 1942, her father established the Desco Shoe Corporation in Webster, Massachusetts and New York when the Eisenberg family moved to Worcester, Massachusetts, from New York. In 1975 in Tel Aviv, Israel, Emil Eisenberg established a girls' vocational school.

She graduated from Bancroft School.

== Music career ==
In 1984, Rich penned the lyrics to "Frankie," a hit in 1985 that went gold for the R&B group Sister Sledge. Since then, she has written songs recorded by Celine Dion, Marc Anthony, Natalie Cole, Luis Fonsi, Jessica Simpson, Patti LaBelle, Chaka Khan, and Diana Ross. She has participated as a writer on Grammy Awards nominated projects, including the 1999 Aretha Franklin / Mary J. Blige duet entitled "Don't Waste Your Time". Denise Rich also contributed to the Grammy Award nominated album, To A Higher Place by Tramaine Hawkins (Columbia Records, 37th Annual Grammy Awards, 1994); as part of this contemporary gospel work, she co-wrote the classic hit "Aim Your Arrow High."

== Philanthropy ==
Gabrielle Rich Aouad, Denise and Marc Rich's daughter, died of leukemia at age 27. As a result, Denise Rich and Philip Aouad, Gabrielle's widower, and her daughters Ilona Rich Schachter and Daniella Rich Kilstock founded the G&P Foundation for Cancer Research. It has since been renamed Gabrielle's Angel Foundation for Cancer Research. As of 2018, Gabrielle's Angel Foundation has awarded $33 million in research grants. Rich also made a $1 million donation funding the construction of The Gery and Emil Eisenberg Assisted Living Residence on the grounds of the Jewish Healthcare Center in Worcester, an 80-unit facility named for her parents.

== Personal life ==
Denise Eisenberg met businessman Marc Rich on a blind date in 1966 and they married 6 months later. They had three children, Daniella, Ilona, and Gabrielle. They divorced in 1996.

=== Ex-husband's presidential pardon ===
Marc Rich received a pardon from U.S. President Bill Clinton on January 20, 2001, Clinton's last day in office. The pardon became controversial after reports surfaced that Denise Rich had made donations totalling more than $1 million to the Democratic Party and the Clinton Presidential Center. At a congressional hearing into whether the pardon was granted in exchange for her contributions, Rich invoked the Fifth Amendment to the United States Constitution, which denies the government power to compel self-incrimination.

=== Citizenship ===
Denise Rich renounced her U.S. citizenship in November 2011 and became an Austrian citizen. (Note: FACTA was signed into law by Barack Obama on March 18, 2010.)
