= Donell Rush =

American singer (1960–1996)

- Born: Donell Rush; September 12, 1960
- Died: March 22, 1996 (aged 35)
- Genres: R&B, pop, dance, house
- Occupation: singer
- Years active: 1987–1996
- Label: RCA

Donell Rush (September 12, 1960 – March 22, 1996) was an American R&B singer, who was signed to RCA Records in the 1990s. He scored a Top 10 hit in the US Billboard Hot Dance Club Play chart with the song "Symphony", from his debut album, Comin' & Goin. "Symphony" peaked at No. 66 in the UK Singles Chart in December 1992. He scored another minor hit with "Let's Get Intimate" featuring Chantay Savage in 1992.

Rush's health had declined significantly shortly after completing his debut album which partially contributed to its cancelation, though he remained private about his condition. Rush died on March 22, 1996 after suffering from a pulmonary embolism.

Year	Single	Peak chart positions			Album
Year	Single	U.S. R&B	U.S. Dance	UK	Album
1988	"Knockin' At My Door"	-	-	-	singles only
1992	"Let's Get Intimate" (Body 2 Body feat. Donell Rush & Chantay Savage)	-	-	-	singles only
1992	"Symphony"	-	7	66	Comin' And Goin'
1993	"If Only You Knew" (US only)	95	-	-	Comin' And Goin'
1993	"Just Can't Say Goodbye" (US only)	-	-	-	Comin' And Goin'
1995	"Time To Celebrate" (Sublevel feat. Donell Rush) (US only)	-	-	-	singles only
1996	"Shout-N-Out" (Lood feat. Donell Rush)	-	-	-	singles only
"-" denotes releases that did not chart or were not released.
