= Overweight Pooch =

American rapper

- Also known as: (Big) Pooch
- Born: September 18, 1970; Harlem, New York
- Origin: Phoenix, Arizona, US
- Died: September 23, 2021 (aged 51) Phoenix, Arizona
- Genres: Hip-hop; dance
- Years active: 1990–1992
- Label: A&M/PolyGram

Overweight Pooch (born Shatonya Davis, September 18, 1970 - September 23, 2021) was a female rapper. Her name comes from her childhood nickname.

== Career ==
In 1991, Pooch released her only album, Female Preacher, on A&M Records and scored a moderate commercial success with the single "I Like It", which charted at number #16 on the U.S. Billboard Hot Dance Music/Club Play chart, and at #58 in the UK Singles Chart. The composition featured vocals by CeCe Peniston, who contributed to two other songs on Davis' album ("Kickin' Da Blues" and "Female Preacher"). She was married and had three children. Pooch died on September 23, 2021—five days after turning 51 years old.

== Discography ==
=== Albums ===
Year	Title
1991	Female Preacher: Release date: July 9; Record label: A&M/PolyGram; Formats: LP, MC, CD

=== Singles ===
Year	Title	Peak chart positions		Album
Year	Title	UK	US Dance	Album
1991	"Ace Is a Spade"	—	—	Female Preacher
1991	"I Like It"	58	16	Female Preacher
"—" denotes a single that did not chart or was not released in that region.

==== Promotional releases ====
"Hip House Party" (1991)
