= Kenneth Karlin =

Danish songwriter and record producer (born 1966)

Kenneth Karlin or just Karlin (born September 18, 1966) is a Danish songwriter and producer who is best known for his work with Carsten Schack, better known as Soulshock, forming the Los Angeles-based producer duo Soulshock & Karlin. They have worked with artists including Whitney Houston, Backstreet Boys, 2Pac, Mary J. Blige, and JoJo.

Before joining Soulshock, Karlin was already an integral part of Denmark's jazz scene, producing Patti LaBelle's song "All Right Now." A musician in the traditional sense of the word, Karlin says, "I think our different backgrounds are what make our tracks interesting."

Karin and Soulshock made the move to Los Angeles for bigger success. After a few months of struggling, they finally had a breakthrough with CeCe Peniston and the single "I'm In The Mood". Their big commercial success came with Monica's #1 R&B single "Before You Walk Out of My Life", which they jointly wrote and produced. Hits with artists such as Toni Braxton, Brandy, Brownstone, Silk, and 2Pac followed.

In 1999, Soulshock & Karlin enjoyed another #1 single with Whitney Houston's "Heartbreak Hotel", which received two Grammy nominations: Best R&B Song, and Best R&B Performance by a Duo or Vocalist. Soulshock & Karlin produced and wrote their first #1 top 40 hit, "Leave (Get Out)", performed by Jojo; the #1 R&B song "Truth Is", performed by American Idol winner Fantasia; and tracks for rap star Nelly. They have recently collaborated with Keyshia Cole, Kelly Rowland, and Samantha Jade. Soulshock & Karlin produced songs for the debut solo albums of Cheryl Cole (3 Words) and Alexandra Burke (Overcome).

== Discography ==
See Soulshock & Karlin discography.
