= Manny Lehman (DJ) =

American musician

- Origin: New York, U.S.
- Genres: House
- Occupation(s): DJ and producer
- Years active: 1990s–present
- Labels: Tommy Boy
- Website: Official Website

Manny Lehman is an American house music DJ and producer. In addition to his production and DJ work, Lehman is one of the most requested remixers presently, transforming many songs into club hits.

Born to Puerto Rican parents in New York, Lehman began his start in the music business working for Manhattan record shop VinylMania, which helped him get introduced to many major names such as Junior Vasquez, Victor Calderone, and Tony Moran, who were the pioneers of a burgeoning house music scene that was taking over New York City's nightlife scene during the early 1990s.

His passion for the music industry allowed him to move further, however this time behind the scenes after he became Director of Dance Promotions at A&M Records. His dedication in bringing fresh talent to the label led him to be promoted to vice president. He is credited in discovering CeCe Peniston and giving her a start in the competitive dance music scene that emerged in the 1990s. He later executive produced her first single, "Finally", which went on to become one of the most memorable club anthems of the early 1990s.

It was his years at A&M that also provided him with more exposure and contacts with major name artists such as Janet Jackson, Sheryl Crow and Sting that gave him more of a drive to venture off into the club music. After forming a partnership with circuit party promoter Jeffrey Sanker, Manny left his job at A&M Records to focus his energy as a full-time deejay and remixer. Extremely popular with gay audiences, his name has drawn hundreds to thousands of revelers to experience first hand his talent as deejay.

He also has lent his talent to more established artists such as Janet Jackson, Cher, Sarah Brightman and Lady Gaga in remixing singles for radio, nightclubs, and mass retail distribution. His chart-topping remixes of Janet Jackson's Come On Get Up, Cher's When the Money's Gone and Sarah Brightman's Harem has allowed him to garner major recognition and status as one of the industry's most demanded remixers. Recently he contributed to a compilation of remixes of Gustavo Santaolalla's track, The Wings, which was the theme song to the film Brokeback Mountain.

== Club venues ==
Already a major name in the circuit party scene, Manny has had the opportunity to spin at some of the world's most popular clubs and venues. Such clubs as Avalon (formerly the Limelight), Twilo and Roxy in New York, Crobar in Miami and Factory in Los Angeles have all been venues he has played to large crowds.

Some circuit parties he has played include the White Party in Palm Springs, Toronto Pride in Toronto, the Black & Blue ball in Montreal and the Fireball party in Chicago. International gigs have regularly included such exotic locales as Tel Aviv, London, Ibiza, Paris, Rio de Janeiro, Mexico City, Japan, Thailand, Amsterdam, São Paulo, Cologne, and Nice.

== Discography ==
Compilations

- 1988: The Garage Sound of Deepest New York - Lehman mixes: Kym Mazelle & Mastermix
- 2000: Circuit Sessions 00.1
- 2001: Circuit Sessions 4: Music for the Body

== See also ==
- List of Puerto Ricans
- Jewish immigration to Puerto Rico
- Electronic dance music
- House music
