= Das EFX discography =

Discography

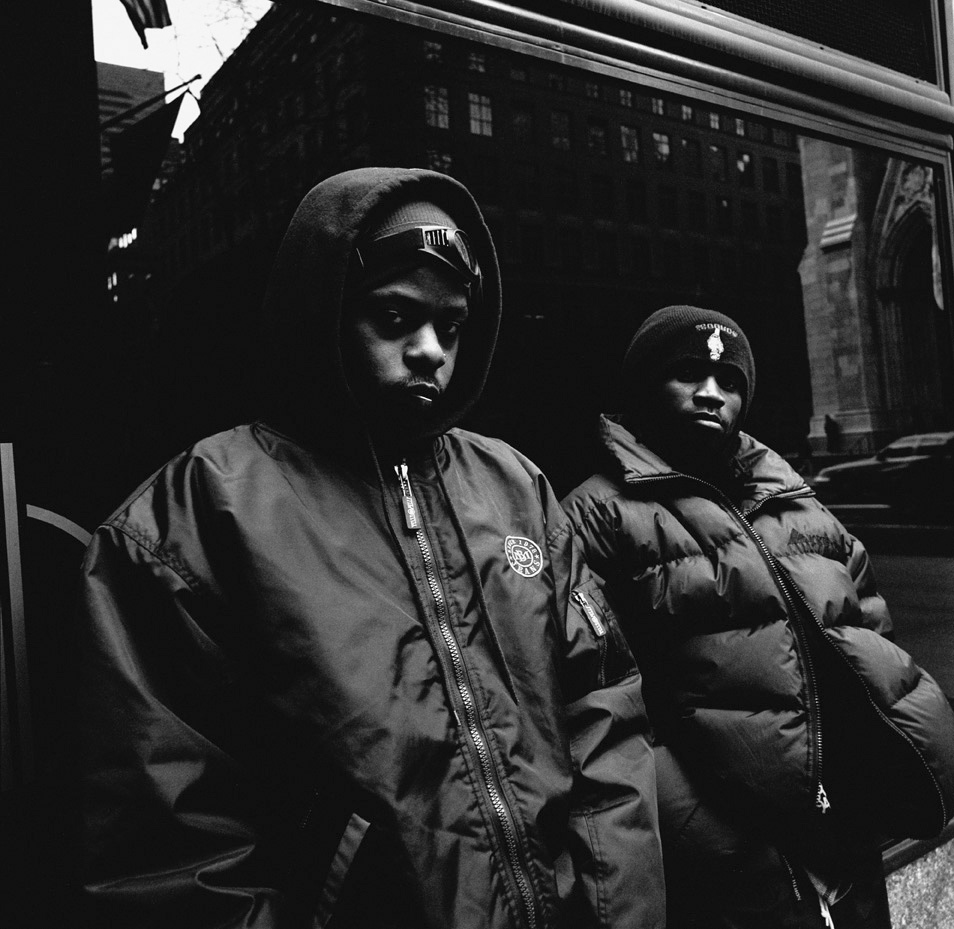
- Studio albums: 5
- Compilation albums: 1
- Singles: 9

The discography of Das EFX consists of 5 studio albums, one compilation album and nine singles.

== Albums ==
=== Studio albums ===
List of albums, with selected chart positions
Title	Album details	Peak chart positions		Certifications
Title	Album details	US	US R&B	Certifications
Dead Serious	Released: April 7, 1992; Label: East West; Format: CD, cassette, digital download, LP	16	1	RIAA: Platinum
Straight Up Sewaside	Released: November 16, 1993; Label: East West; Format: CD, cassette, digital download, LP	20	6	
Hold It Down	Released: September 26, 1995; Label: East West; Format: CD, cassette, digital download, LP	22	4	
Generation EFX	Released: March 24, 1998; Label: Elektra; Format: CD, cassette, digital download	48	10	
How We Do	Released: September 23, 2003; Label: UTR; Format: CD, digital download	–	–	

=== Compilation album ===
Year	Album
2001	The Very Best of Das EFX: Released: July 3, 2001; Label: Rhino Entertainment

== Singles ==
Year	Single	Chart positions			Album
Year	Single	U.S. Hot 100	U.S. R&B	U.S. Rap	Album
1992	"They Want EFX"	25	5	1	Dead Serious
1992	"Mic Checka"	–	22	1	Dead Serious
1992	"Straight Out the Sewer"	-	66	3	Dead Serious
1993	"Freakit"	43	24	6	Straight Up Sewaside
1994	"Baknaffek"	–	98	44	Straight Up Sewaside
1995	"Real Hip-Hop"	61	48	10	Hold It Down
1996	"Microphone Master" [Remix] (featuring Mobb Deep)	86	39	5	Hold It Down
1998	"Rap Scholar" (featuring Redman)	–	–	–	Generation EFX

== Guest appearances ==
Year	Title	Artist	Album
1992	"Cummin' at Cha"	EPMD	Business Never Personal
1992	"Check Yo Self"	Ice Cube	The Predator
1994	"Here They Come"	PMD	Shade Business
1995	"Represent the Real Hip-Hop"	KRS-One	KRS-One
1996	"Watcha Gonna Do"; "Nuttin' Move"; "Rugged-n-Raw" (Remix)	PMD	Business Is Business
1996	"Knick Knack Part II"	PMD	"It's the Pee" 12"
1997	"Coast to Coast"	Hurricane G	All Woman
1997	"Freestyle"	Funkmaster Flex, PMD	The Mix Tape, Vol. II
