= List of Billboard number-one dance singles of 1992 =

Billboard magazine compiled the top-performing dance singles in the United States on the Hot Dance Music Club Play chart and the Hot Dance Music 12-inch Singles Sales chart. Premiered in 1976, the Club Play chart ranked the most-played singles on dance club based on reports from a national sample of club DJs. The 12-inch Singles Sales chart was launched in 1985 to compile the best-selling dance singles based on retail sales across the United States. On the issue dated June 20, 1992, Billboard began to tabulate cassette tape and CD maxi-singles along with 12-inch singles, and the sales chart was renamed as the Hot Dance Music Maxi-Singles Sales.

== Charts history ==
Chart history
Issue date	Hot Dance Music Club Play		Hot Dance Music 12-inch Singles Sales		Ref.
Issue date	Title	Artist(s)	Title	Artist(s)	Ref.
January 4	"I'll Be Your Friend"	Robert Owens	"Too Blind to See It"	Kym Sims	
January 11	"I'll Be Your Friend"	Robert Owens	"Change"	Lisa Stansfield	
January 18	"Hold On (Tighter to Love)"	Clubland	"Move Any Mountain (Progen 91)"	The Shamen	
January 25	"Just a Touch of Love"	C+C Music Factory	"The Comfort Zone"	Vanessa Williams	
February 1	"Mindflux"	N-Joi	"Black or White"	Michael Jackson	
February 8	"A Deeper Love"	Clivillés & Cole	"Black or White"	Michael Jackson	
February 15	"Only Love Can Break Your Heart"	Saint Etienne	"Black or White"	Michael Jackson	
February 22	"Only Love Can Break Your Heart"	Saint Etienne	"I'm Too Sexy"	Right Said Fred	
February 29	"We Got a Love Thang"	CeCe Peniston	"We Got a Love Thang"	CeCe Peniston	
March 7	"We Got a Love Thang"	CeCe Peniston	"We Got a Love Thang"	CeCe Peniston	
March 14	"Comin' On Strong"	Desiya	"Remember the Time"	Michael Jackson	
March 21	"Chic Mystique"	Chic	"Remember the Time"	Michael Jackson	
March 28	"Don't Lose the Magic"	Shawn Christopher	"Remember the Time"	Michael Jackson	
April 4	"Don't Lose the Magic"	Shawn Christopher	"Remember the Time"	Michael Jackson	
April 11	"Moira Jane's Café"	Definition of Sound	"Remember the Time"	Michael Jackson	
April 18	"Make It Mine"	The Shamen	"Ain't 2 Proud 2 Beg"	TLC	
April 25	"Hear the Music"	Gypsymen	"Nu Nu"	Lidell Townsell	
May 2	"Workout"	Frankie Knuckles featuring Roberta Gilliam	"Nu Nu"	Lidell Townsell	
May 9	"Workout"	Frankie Knuckles featuring Roberta Gilliam	"In the Closet"	Michael Jackson	
May 16	"Take Me Back to Love Again"	Kathy Sledge	"In the Closet"	Michael Jackson	
May 23	"Love You All My Lifetime"	Chaka Khan	"In the Closet"	Michael Jackson	
May 30	"(Can You) Feel the Passion"	Blue Pearl	"In the Closet"	Michael Jackson	
June 6	"Closer"	Mr. Fingers	"My Lovin' (You're Never Gonna Get It)"	En Vogue	
June 13	"In the Closet"	Michael Jackson	"My Lovin' (You're Never Gonna Get It)"	En Vogue	
June 20	"Club Lonely"	Lil Louis & the World featuring Joi Cardwell	"Love You All My Lifetime"	Chaka Khan	
June 27	"Keep On Walkin'"	CeCe Peniston	"Baby Got Back"	Sir Mix-A-Lot	
July 4	"Nothing Can Stop Us"	Saint Etienne	"Club Lonely"	Lil Louis & the World featuring Joi Cardwell	
July 11	"Surrender Yourself"	The Daou	"They Want EFX"	Das EFX	
July 18	"Runaway"	Deee-Lite	"Set Me Free"	Clubland Featuring Zemya Hamilton	
July 25	"Rain Falls"	Frankie Knuckles featuring Lisa Michaelis	"Runaway"	Deee-Lite	
August 1	"Pennies from Heaven"	Inner City	"Runaway"	Deee-Lite	
August 8	"Pennies from Heaven"	Inner City	"Jump Around"	House Of Pain	
August 15	"Jump!"	The Movement	"Jam"	Michael Jackson	
August 22	"Strobelite Honey"	Black Sheep	"Jam"	Michael Jackson	
August 29	"It's a Fine Day"	Opus III	"Jam"	Michael Jackson	
September 5	"Rhythm Is a Dancer"	Snap!	"Jam"	Michael Jackson	
September 12	"LSI (Love Sex Intelligence)"	The Shamen	"Everybody's Free (To Feel Good)"	Rozalla	
September 19	"LSI (Love Sex Intelligence)"	The Shamen	"Everybody's Free (To Feel Good)"	Rozalla	
September 26	"Everybody's Free (To Feel Good)"	Rozalla	"Everybody's Free (To Feel Good)"	Rozalla	
October 3	"The Colour of Love"	Reese Project	"Everybody's Free (To Feel Good)"	Rozalla	
October 10	"The Colour of Love"	Reese Project	"The Hitman"	AB Logic	
October 17	"Keep It Comin' (Dance Till You Can't Dance No More)"	C+C Music Factory featuring Q-Unique and Deborah Cooper	"The Hitman"	AB Logic	
October 24	"Hypnotized"	Clubland featuring Zemya Hamilton	"LSI (Love Sex Intelligence)"	The Shamen	
October 31	"Stinkin Thinkin"	Happy Mondays	"Stinkin Thinkin"	Happy Mondays	
November 7	"Stinkin Thinkin"	Happy Mondays	"Saved My Life"	Lil Louis & the World featuring Joi Cardwell	
November 14	"Saved My Life"	Lil Louis & the World featuring Joi Cardwell	"Sesame's Treet"	Smart E's	
November 21	"Erotica"	Madonna	"Rump Shaker"	Wreckx-N-Effect	
November 28	"Are You Ready to Fly"	Rozalla	"Rump Shaker"	Wreckx-N-Effect	
December 5	"Carry On"	Martha Wash	"Rump Shaker"	Wreckx-N-Effect	
December 12	"The New Anthem"	Reel 2 Real featuring Erick More	"Erotica"	Madonna	
December 19	"Leash Called Love"	The Sugarcubes	"Erotica"	Madonna	
December 26	"It's Gonna Be a Lovely Day"	The S.O.U.L. S.Y.S.T.E.M. featuring Michelle Visage	"Are You Ready to Fly"	Rozalla	

== See also ==
- 1992 in music
- List of Billboard Hot 100 number ones of 1992
