= Give It to Ya =

Single by Chantay Savage

from the album Here We Go...
- Released: April 27, 1994
- Genre: R&B
- Label: RCA Records
- Songwriters: Jeremiah McAllister, Eric L Miller, Manfred Mohr, Chantay Savage, Marc Williams

Chantay Savage singles chronology
"It's a Summer Thang" (1994)	"Give It to Ya" (1994)	"I Will Survive" (1996)

Music video
- "Give It to Ya" on YouTube

"Give It to Ya" is the title of a R&B single by Chantay Savage. It was the final single from her album Here We Go...

== Music video ==
A music video was directed by Jeffery Byrd in 1994 in Los Angeles.

== Chart positions ==
Chart (1994)	Peak position
U.S. Billboard Hot R&B Singles	80
