= A Little Bit More (Kym Sims song) =

1992 song by Kym Sims

Single by Kym Sims

from the album Too Blind to See It
- Released: June 15, 1992
- Length: 4:05
- Label: Atco
- Songwriter(s): Eric Miller; Jere McAllister; Berlanda Drake
- Producer(s): Steve "Silk" Hurley

Kym Sims singles chronology
"Take My Advice" (1992)	"A Little Bit More" (1992)	"I Must Be Free" (1995)

Music video
- "A Little Bit More" on YouTube

"A Little Bit More" is a song by American singer Kym Sims and produced by Steve "Silk" Hurley. It was written by Eric Miller, Jere McAllister and Berlanda Drake, and released in June 1992 by Atco Records as the third and last single taken from Sims' only album, Too Blind to See It (1992). Featuring backing vocals by Donell Rush and Chantay Savage, it became a club hit and was a top-30 hit on the UK Singles Chart, peaking at number 30. On the UK Dance Singles chart and the UK Club Chart, it reached numbers 11 and two. In 2019, a new remix of the song by Dutch techno & progressive DJ Michel De Hey was released.

== Critical reception ==
British Newcastle Evening Chronicle named "A Little Bit More" as one of the best songs of the Too Blind to See It album. In a retrospective review, Pop Rescue felt it "reminds me a LOT of Dannii Minogue's 1991 track 'Baby Love'", adding, "but then, Steve 'Silk' Hurley was behind both tracks, so it’s of no real surprise."

== Track listings ==
- 12-inch, UK
1. "A Little Bit" (MoreRhythm Supply Mix) — 6:25
2. "A Little Bit" (MoreDub Supply Mix) — 5:06
3. "A Little Bit" (MoreHurley's Extended Mix) — 6:45
4. "A Little Bit" (MoreDub Mix) — 5:38
5. "A Little Bit" (MoreLust Mix) — 4:20
- CD single, UK
1. "A Little Bit" (MoreHurley's Radio Edit) — 4:05
2. "A Little Bit" (MoreJoey's Radio Edit) — 3:48
3. "A Little Bit" (MoreRhythm Supply Mix) — 6:23
4. "A Little Bit" (MoreDub Supply Mix) — 5:08
5. "A Little Bit" (MoreHurley's Extended Mix) — 6:47
- CD maxi, Europe
1. "A Little Bit" (MoreHurley's Radio Edit)
2. "A Little Bit" (MoreJoey's Radio Edit)
3. "A Little Bit" (MoreRhythm Supply Mix)
4. "A Little Bit" (MoreDub Supply Mix)
5. "A Little Bit" (MoreHurley's Extended Mix)

== Charts ==
Chart (1992)	Peak position
Europe (Eurochart Hot 100)	92
Europe (European Dance Radio)	10
UK Singles (OCC)	30
UK Dance (Music Week)	11
UK Club Chart (Music Week)	2
