= Too Blind to See It =

Too Blind to See It may refer to:

- Too Blind to See It (album), a 1992 album by Kym Sims
- "Too Blind to See It" (song), from the album
