= Take My Advice =

1992 single by Kym Sims

Single by Kym Sims

from the album Too Blind to See It
- Released: March 16, 1992
- Genre: House
- Length: 3:59
- Label: Atco; EastWest
- Songwriters: Steve "Silk" Hurley; Tonia Hurley; Kym Sims; Marc Williams
- Producer: Steve "Silk" Hurley

Kym Sims singles chronology
"Too Blind to See It" (1991)	"Take My Advice" (1992)	"A Little Bit More" (1992)

Music video
- "Take My Advice" on YouTube

Not to be confused woth the 1927 play by J. C. Nugent and Elliott Nugent

"Take My Advice" is a song by American singer and songwriter Kym Sims, co-written and produced by Steve "Silk" Hurley. It is the follow-up to her successful 1991 debut, "Too Blind to See It", and was released in March 1992 by Atco and East West Records as the second single from her album by the same name (1992). It became a club hit, peaking at number 13 on the UK Singles Chart and number five on the US Billboard Hot Dance Club Songs chart. On the Eurochart Hot 100, it reached number 42. In 2015, Sims released new remixes, as "Take My Advice" (The 2015 Remixes) part 1 and 2.

== Critical reception ==
Larry Flick from Billboard magazine described the song as a "engaging, pop-flavored houser", noting that a "star-quality vocal performance is inflected with a proper helping of sass and charm". He also added that the influence of producer Steve "Silk" Hurley is prominent, "which should help keep dancefloors filled." Dave Sholin from the Gavin Report felt it "has all those same unique qualities that make Kym's music and sound so special." A reviewer from Music Week commented that "songwise, it tries a little too hard to be poppy, while the production is lacklustre by Hurley's admittedly very high standards. However, it still stands a good chance of crossing over." Newcastle Evening Chronicle named it one of the best songs of the album. In a retrospective review, Pop Rescue deemed it the "ideal follow up" to "Too Blind to See It". James Hamilton from the Record Mirror Dance Update named it a "catchy, lightweight follow-up". Sylvia Patterson from Smash Hits gave the song three out of five, remarking that "this one's got fantastically weedy rap bits in it", adding that "this will be another gigantic merry house winner."

== Track listings ==
- 7-inch, Europe
1. "Take My Advice" (original 7-inch) — 3:59
2. "Take My Advice" (urban 7-inch) — 3:59
- 12-inch, US
1. "Take My Advice" (Hurley's extended mix) — 5:31
2. "Take My Advice" (Silky 70's mix) — 7:04
3. "Take My Advice" (E-Smoove's Late Nite mix) — 6:17
4. "Take My Advice" (Maurice's Underground mix) — 6:03
- CD single, UK and Europe
1. "Take My Advice" (original 7-inch) — 3:59
2. "Take My Advice" (urban 7-inch) — 3:59
3. "Take My Advice" (Silky 70's mix) — 7:02
4. "Take My Advice" (E-Smoove's Late Nite mix) — 6:15

== Charts ==
=== Weekly charts ===
Chart (1992)	Peak position
Australia (ARIA)	123
Europe (Eurochart Hot 100)	42
Europe (European Dance Radio)	9
Ireland (IRMA)	18
Israel (Israeli Singles Chart)	26
UK Singles (OCC)	13
UK Airplay (Music Week)	7
UK Dance (Music Week)	2
UK Club Chart (Music Week)	5
US Billboard Hot 100	86
US Hot Dance Club Play (Billboard)	5

=== Year-end charts ===
Chart (1992)	Position
UK Club Chart (Music Week)	71

== Sampling ==
German DJ/artist Marusha used samples from "Take My Advice" in her track "Go Ahead".
