= Too Blind to See It (album) =

1992 studio album by Kym Sims

Studio album by Kym Sims
- Released: April 1992
- Studio: Tanglewood Studios (Brookfield, Illinois)
- Genre: House
- Label: Atco/Atlantic; 92104
- Producer: Steve "Silk" Hurley

Professional ratings
Review scores
| Source | Rating |
|---|---|
| AllMusic | 2/5 stars |
| Robert Christgau | (choice cut) |

Too Blind to See It is the only album by American singer Kym Sims, released in 1992. It was produced by Steve "Silk" Hurley and includes the worldwide hit single "Too Blind to See It" which reached number 38 on the US Billboard Hot 100 and number five in the UK Singles Chart. Two further singles were released from the album: "Take My Advice" (UK No. 13) and "A Little Bit More" (UK No. 30).

== Track listing ==
| No. | Title | Writer(s) | Length |
|---|---|---|---|
| 1. | "Too Blind to See It" | Steve Hurley | 3:30 |
| 2. | "Take My Advice" | S. Hurley; Tonia Hurley; Kym Sims; Marc Williams | 4:42 |
| 3. | "A Little Bit More" | Eric Miller; Jere McAllister; Berlanda Drake | 4:58 |
| 4. | "Take Me to the Groove" | McAllister; S. Hurley | 4:38 |
| 5. | "One Look" | S. Hurley; Manfred Mohr | 3:45 |
| 6. | "I Found Love" | Miller; McAllister | 5:13 |
| 7. | "Shoulda Known Better" | Miller; Chante Savage; McAllister; Sims | 4:37 |
| 8. | "In My Eyes" | Donell Rush; Savage; Sims | 4:55 |
| 9. | "Never Shoulda Let You Go" | S. Hurley; T. Hurley | 4:31 |
| 10. | "I Can't Stop" | Laney Stewart | 4:12 |
| 11. | "Too Blind to See It" (Soul Mix) | S. Hurley | 3:52 |

== Personnel ==
Credits adapted from album liner notes.

=== Musicians ===
- Kym Sims – primary artist, vocals, backing vocals (tracks 1–5, 7–11)
- Frost – rap (track 11)
- Steve "Silk" Hurley – backing vocals (tracks 1–2 & 11), keyboards, drum programming
- Donell Rush – guest artist, backing vocals (tracks 3–4, 6–8 & 10)
- Chante Savage – guest artist, backing vocals (tracks 3–4, 6–8 & 10)

=== Production ===
- All tracks produced, arranged and mixed by Steve "Silk" Hurley
- Vocals produced and arranged by Steve "Silk" Hurley, Donell Rush & Chante Savage
- Engineers: Larry Sturm, Eric Miller, Steve "Silk" Hurley
- Executive producers: Frank Rodrigo, Steve "Silk" Hurley, Joey Carvello
- Recorded at Tanglewood Studios, Brookfield, Illinois
- Art direction: Thomas Bricker
- Photography: Cesar Vera
- Stylist: Todd Hartnett
- Hair and make up: Sam Fine

== Charts ==
| Chart (1992) | Peak position |
|---|---|
| UK Albums (OCC) | 39 |
