= If You Believe =

If You Believe may refer to:

- If You Believe (film)
- "If You Believe", a 1955 song by Johnnie Ray with Percy Faith & His Orchestra
- "If You Believe" (George Harrison song)
- "If You Believe" (Kenny Loggins song)
- "If You Believe" (Sasha song)
- "If You Believe" (Chantay Savage song)
- "If You Believe", a song by Blues Saraceno from the album Indie Pop
- "If You Believe", a song by Irving Berlin
- "If You Believe", a song by Rachael Lampa
- If You Believe, 1999 album by Jim Brickman
