= Hold It Down (Das EFX album) =

Studio album by Das EFX
- Released: September 26, 1995
- Studio: North Shore Soundworks (New York, NY); D&D Studios (New York, NY); Ian London Studios (East Islip, NY); The Sewa; Chung King Studios (New York, NY); Music Palace (New York, NY)
- Genre: East Coast hip hop; hardcore hip hop
- Length: 1:13:39
- Label: EastWest
- Producer: PMD (exec.); Das EFX; DJ Clark Kent; DJ Premier; DJ Scratch; Easy Mo Bee; Kevin Geeda; Peter Lewis; Pete Rock; Showbiz; Solid Scheme; Soul G.

Das EFX chronology
Straight Up Sewaside (1993)	Hold It Down (1995)	Generation EFX (1998)

Singles from Hold It Down
- 1. "Real Hip-Hop" Released: September 12, 1995; 2. "Microphone Master" Released: January 30, 1996

Professional ratings
Review scores
Source	Rating
AllMusic	2/5 stars
Muzik	3.5/5 stars
Rap Pages	7/10
RapReviews	7/10
The Austin Chronicle	2/5
The Source	3.5/5 stars
Trouser Press	(Negative)

Hold It Down is the third studio album by American Brooklyn-based hip hop duo Das EFX. It was released on September 26, 1995, via East West Records. Recording sessions took place at Ian London Studios in East Islip, at Northshore Soundworks, D&D Studios, The Music Palace and Chung King Studios in New York, and at The Sewa. Production was handled by Easy Mo Bee, Solid Scheme, DJ Premier, DJ Scratch, DJ Clark Kent, Kevin Geeda, Peter Lewis, Showbiz, Soul G., Pete Rock and Das EFX themselves, with PMD serving as an executive producer. It features guest appearances from KRS-One and PMD.

The album peaked at number 22 on the Billboard 200 and number 4 on the Top R&B/Hip-Hop Albums in the United States. Its singles "Real Hip-Hop" and "Microphone Master" made it to the Billboard Hot 100, reaching No. 61 and No. 86, respectively. The song "Represent the Real" first appeared under the title "Represent the Real Hip Hop" as the B-side to KRS-One's "MC's Act Like They Don't Know" single, which was released during the summer of 1995, taken off of his eponymous album KRS-One.

== Track listing ==
No.	Title	Writer(s)	Producer(s)	Length
1.	"Intro (Once Again)"	Andre Weston; William Hines	Peter Lewis	1:08
2.	"No Diggedy"	Weston; Hines; Chris Martin	DJ Premier	4:03
3.	"Knockin' Niggaz Off"	Weston; Hines; Osten Harvey Jr.	Easy Mo Bee	3:24
4.	"Here We Go"	Weston; Hines; Chris Charity; Derek Lynch	Solid Scheme	4:05
5.	"Real Hip-Hop" (Original Version)	Weston; Hines; Martin	DJ Premier	4:09
6.	"Here It Is"	Weston; Hines; Kevin Geeda; Joe Bishop; Gordon Jenkins	Kevin Geeda	4:59
7.	"Microphone Master"	Weston; Hines; Harvey Jr.	Easy Mo Bee	4:30
8.	"40 & a Blunt"	Weston; Hines; Harvey Jr.	Easy Mo Bee	3:17
9.	"Buck-Buck"	Weston; Hines	Das EFX	3:12
10.	"Intro"			0:09
11.	"Can't Have Nuttin'"	Weston; Hines; Gerald Stevens	Soul G.	5:34
12.	"Alright"	Weston; Hines; Harvey Jr.	Easy Mo Bee	4:23
13.	"Hold It Down"	Weston; Hines; Harvey Jr.	Easy Mo Bee	4:47
14.	"Dedicated"	Weston; Hines; Rodolfo Franklin	DJ Clark Kent	3:46
15.	"Ready to Rock Rough Rhymes" (featuring Solid Scheme)	Weston; Hines; Charity; Lynch	Solid Scheme	4:34
16.	"Represent the Real" (featuring KRS-One)	Weston; Hines; Lawrence Parker	Showbiz	3:19
17.	"Comin' Thru"	Weston; Hines; George Spivey	DJ Scratch	3:32
18.	"Hardcore Rap Act"	Weston; Hines; Charity; Lynch	Solid Scheme	4:30
19.	"Bad News" (featuring PMD)	Weston; Hines; Parrish Smith; Spivey	DJ Scratch	2:20
20.	"Real Hip-Hop" (Pete Rock Remix)	Weston; Hines	Pete Rock	3:58
Total length:				1:13:39

Sample credits

- Track 6 contains elements from "Blue Prelude" written by Joe Bishop and Gordon Jenkins and performed by Nina Simone.
- Track 12 contains elements from "Different Strokes" written by John Andrew Cameron and John Zachary and performed by Syl Johnson.
- Track 13 contains elements from "Slum Creeper" by Quincy Jones.
- Track 14 contains elements from "Lock It in the Pocket" written by Richard Steacker and performed by Grover Washington Jr.

== Personnel ==
- Andre "Krazy Drayz" Weston – vocals, producer (track 9)
- Willie "Skoob" Hines – vocals, producer (track 9)
- Lawrence "KRS-One" Parker – vocals (track 16)
- Parrish "PMD" Smith – vocals (track 19), executive producer
- Rodney "DJ Dice" Battle – scratches
- Peter Lewis – producer (track 1)
- Chris "DJ Premier" Martin – producer (tracks: 2, 5)
- Osten "Easy Mo Bee" Harvey Jr. – producer (tracks: 3, 7, 8, 12, 13)
- Chris Charity – producer (tracks: 4, 15, 18)
- Derek Lynch – producer (tracks: 4, 15, 18)
- Kevin Geeda – producer (track 6)
- Gerald "Soul G." Stevens – producer (track 11)
- Rodolfo "DJ Clark Kent" Franklin – producer (track 14)
- Rodney "Showbiz" LeMay – producer (track 16)
- George "DJ Scratch" Spivey – producer (tracks: 17, 19)
- Peter "Pete Rock" Phillips – producer & mixing (track 20)
- Charlie Marotta – engineering (track 1), mixing (tracks: 1, 18)
- Eddie Sancho – engineering (tracks: 2, 5)
- Norty Cotto – engineering (tracks: 2, 5)
- Luis Tineo – engineering assistant (tracks: 2, 5)
- Ken Wallace – engineering (tracks: 3, 6–8, 11–15)
- Ivan 'Doc' Rodriguez – mixing (tracks: 3, 4, 6–8, 12, 13, 17)
- Mike Tuosto – mixing (track 3)
- Rick St. Hilaire – engineering (tracks: 9, 19), mixing (tracks: 9, 11, 15, 19)
- Kenny Ortiz – mixing (track 14)
- Gordon "Commissioner Gordon" Williams – engineering (track 16)
- Jamie Staub – engineering (track 20)
- Alli Truch – art direction
- Romon Kimin "Ro-Starr" Yang – design
- Butch Belair – photography

== Charts ==
Chart (1995)	Peak position
US Billboard 200	22
US Top R&B/Hip-Hop Albums (Billboard)	4
