= If You Believe (Chantay Savage song) =

Single by Chantay Savage

from the album Here We Go...
- Released: July 28, 1993
- Recorded: 1992–1993
- Genre: R&B
- Length: 4:18
- Label: RCA Records
- Songwriters: Dawson; Miller; Savage
- Producer: Chantay Savage

Chantay Savage singles chronology
"Betcha'll Never Find" (1993)	"If You Believe" (1993)	"Don't Let It Go to Your Head" (1994)

"If You Believe" is a song by American singer-songwriter Chantay Savage, released in July 1993 by RCA Records as the second single from her debut album, Here We Go... (1993). The song was originally released independently on ID Records. It was later included on her album and appeared in the 1995 film Party Girl.

== Track listing ==
- UK CD Single
1. "If You Believe" (Steve "Silk" Hurley's 7" Mix) — 4:02
2. "If You Believe" (E Smoove's 7" Mix) — 4:12
3. "If You Believe" (E Smoove's 13 Minute Believer Mix) — 13:03
4. "If You Believe" (Believe In Steve's Club Mix) — 7:35
5. "If You Believe" (Hurley's Believable Dub) — 4:20
6. "If You Believe" (Steve's Dub Instrumental Mix) — 4:20
- US Promo CD
1. "If You Believe" (E-Smoove Radio Version) — 4:12
2. "If You Believe" (E-Smoove Extended Mix) — 5:29
3. "If You Believe" (E-Smoove Radio Version w/o Rap) — 3:24

== Chart positions ==
Chart (1992–1993)	Peak position
UK Singles (OCC)	83
UK Dance (Music Week)	30
UK Club Chart (Music Week)	21
US Hot Dance Singles Sales (Billboard)	42
US Hot R&B Singles (Billboard)	75
