= Saved My Life =

Saved My Life may refer to:

- Saved My Life (Lil Louis & the World song)
- Saved My Life (Sia song)
