= Don't Let It Go to Your Head =

Don't Let It Go to Your Head may refer to:

- "Don't Let It Go to Your Head" (Chantay Savage song), 1994
- "Don't Let It Go to Your Head" (Fefe Dobson song), 2005
- "Don't Let It Go to Your Head" (Jean Carn song), 1978; covered by the Brand New Heavies (1992) and Brand Nubian (1998)
- "Don't Let It Go to Your Head", a song by Nat King Cole from After Midnight, 1957
