= Free (Deniece Williams song) =

1976 single by Deniece Williams

Single by Deniece Williams

from the album This Is Niecy
- B-side: "Cause You Love Me Baby"
- Released: 1976
- Length: 3:25
- Label: Columbia
- Songwriters: Williams, Hank Redd, Nathan Watts, Susaye Greene
- Producers: Maurice White, Charles Stepney

Deniece Williams singles chronology
"Yes, I'm Ready" (1970)	"Free" (1976)	"It's Important to Me" (1976)

Audio video
- "Free" on YouTube

"Free" is a song by American singer Deniece Williams that was included on her album This Is Niecy. The song was written by Williams, Hank Redd, Nathan Watts and Susaye Greene and produced by Maurice White and Charles Stepney.

"Free" was Williams' breakthrough single reaching No. 2 on the US Billboard Hot Soul Singles chart and No. 25 on the Billboard Hot 100. The single reached No. 1 on the UK Singles Chart for two weeks in May 1977.

== Covers ==
- Michał Urbaniak covered the song for his 1978 album, Ecstasy.
- In 1998, M-Doc's version of the song for his album Young, Black, Rich and Famous and released as the lead single charted at number 61 on the US Hot R&B/Hip-Hop Singles chart.
- Bassist Marcus Miller recorded "Free" for his 2007 album of the same name. Corinne Bailey Rae provided lead vocals.
- Rapper Drake sampled "Free" on the track "Make Them Pay", featured on his 2026 album Iceman.

== Charts ==
=== Weekly charts ===
Chart (1976–1977)	Peak position
Australia (Kent Music Report)	57
Belgium (Ultratop 50 Flanders)	18
Canada Top Singles (RPM)	32
Canada Adult Contemporary (RPM)	39
Ireland (IRMA)	8
Netherlands (Dutch Top 40)	14
Netherlands (Single Top 100)	14
UK Singles (Official Charts)	1
US Billboard Hot 100	25
US Adult Contemporary (Billboard)	38
US Hot R&B/Hip-Hop Songs (Billboard)	2
US Cash Box Top 100	21

=== Year-end charts ===
Chart (1977)	Position
Canada Top Singles (RPM)	198
UK Singles (OCC)	30

== Certifications ==
Region	Certification	Certified units/sales
United Kingdom (BPI)	Silver	250,000^{^}
^{^} Shipments figures based on certification alone.
