= How We Do =

How We Do can refer to:

- "How We Do" (song), a single released by American rapper The Game
- How We Do (album), an album by hip hop duo Das EFX
- "How We Do (Party)", a song by Rita Ora
- "How We Do", a song by Hardwell and Showtek
