= Here We Go... (Chantay Savage album) =

Studio album by Chantay Savage
- Released: June 22, 1993
- Recorded: 1992–1993
- Genre: R&B
- Label: RCA
- Producer: M. Doc; E-Smoove; Steve "Silk" Hurley; Jere MC

Chantay Savage chronology
Here We Go... (1993)	I Will Survive (Doin' It My Way) (1996)

Singles from Here We Go...
- 1. "Betcha'll Never Find" Released: May 26, 1993; 2. "If You Believe" Released: July 28, 1993; 3. "Don't Let It Go to Your Head" Released: January 25, 1994; 4. "Give It to Ya" Released: April 27, 1994

Professional ratings
Review scores
Source	Rating
Allmusic	3/5 stars

Here We Go... is the debut studio album by American R&B singer-songwriter Chantay Savage, released on June 22, 1993, on RCA Records. Here We Go... peaked at number 89 on Billboard's Top R&B/Hip-Hop Albums chart.

== Track listing ==
No.	Title	Writer(s)	Producer(s)	Length
1.	"Betcha'll Never Find"	Chantay Savage; Steve "Silk" Hurley	S. Hurley	4:42
2.	"Don't Let It Go to Your Head"	Savage; Jamie Principle; Marc Williams; S. Hurley	S. Hurley	4:09
3.	"Take Your Time"	Eric Miller; Jere McAllister	E-Smoove	5:02
4.	"Give It to Ya"	Savage; Miller; McAllister; Manny Mohr; Williams	Jere MC; M. Doc	4:18
5.	"The Way You Turn Me On"	Savage; McAllister; Williams	Jere MC; M. Doc	4:54
6.	"Here We Go Again"	S. Hurley; Tonia Hurley; Williams	S. Hurley	5:12
7.	"If You Believe"	Savage; Miller; Michael Dawson	E-Smoove	4:12
8.	"Surprise"	Savage; McAllister; Williams	Jere MC; M. Doc	4:06
9.	"Something New"	Savage; Miller; McAllister	E-Smoove	5:20
10.	"I Call Your Name"	Savage; Principle; Williams	E-Smoove	3:53

== Charts ==
Chart (1993)	Peak position
US Top R&B/Hip-Hop Albums (Billboard)	89
