= This Time (Chantay Savage album) =

Studio album by Chantay Savage
- Released: July 13, 1999
- Recorded: 1998–1999
- Genre: R&B
- Length: 54:21
- Label: RCA
- Producer: Kay Fingers; Kenny Flav; Robert Jazayeri; Marc Kinchen; Sean "Mystro" Mather; Keith Sweat; Daniel Weatherspoon

Chantay Savage chronology
I Will Survive (Doin' It My Way) (1996)	This Time (1999)

Singles from (Chantay Savage album)
- 1. "Come Around" Released: June 11, 1999; 2. "My Oh My" Released: 1999

This Time is the third studio album by American R&B singer Chantay Savage. It was released by RCA Records on July 13, 1999 in the United States. Production for the album was handled by several producers, including Kay Fingers, Kenny Flav, Robert Jazayeri, Marc Kinchen, Sean "Mystro" Mather, Keith Sweat, and Daniel Weatherspoon. This Time peaked at number 56 on Billboard's US Top R&B/Hip-Hop Albums. The single, "Come Around", peaked at number 62 on the Hot R&B/Hip-Hop Singles & Tracks.

== Critical reception ==
Professional ratings
Review scores
Source	Rating
Allmusic	4/5 stars
The State	(favorable)
Vibe	(mixed)

Allmusic editor Jaime Sunao Ikeda found that This Time "far outdistances" Savage's previous album an wrote: "Savage is presented here with excellent material on which she uses her impressive 'skills' to their best use paying homage to the likes Angela Bofill, Anita Baker, and Chaka Khan along the way by way of her approach and interpretation. This is one of those rare assemblage of songs that is so well sequenced and sung that it is a difficult task to single out outstanding tracks. The production harks back to the day when emotional delivery was placed ahead of perfect phrasing and pitch."

== Track listing ==
No.	Title	Writer(s)	Producer(s)	Length
1.	"My Oh My"	Chantay Savage; Craig Simpkins; Grover Washington; John Blake, Jr.	Kay Fingers	5:02
2.	"If You Like"	Savage; Kenny Dickerson; Kevin Evans; Marc Kinchen	Kinchen; Kenny Flav (co.)	4:09
3.	"Come Around"	Athena Cage; Jerry Flowers; Keith Sweat	Sweat	4:34
4.	"This Time"	Savage; Daniel Weatherspoon	Weatherspoon	5:16
5.	"Round And Round"	Savage; Daniel Weatherspoon	Weatherspoon	3:50
6.	"Can It Be"	Savage; Robert "Esmail" Jazayeri; Sean "The Mystro" Mather	Jazayeri; Mather	4:18
7.	"Stay with Me"	Savage; Dickerson; Kinchen	Kinchen; Kenny Flav (co.)	3:39
8.	"For Your Love"	Savage; Daniel Weatherspoon	Weatherspoon	4:50
9.	"Funny Ways"	Savage; Daniel Weatherspoon	Weatherspoon	4:59
10.	"Just Can't Take This"	Savage; Daniel Weatherspoon	Weatherspoon	3:33
11.	"My Oh My (Smoothed Out)"	Savage; Simpkins	Fingers	5:35
12.	"Pillow Talk"	Aaron Pettigrew; Shabazz Curtis	Fingers	4:53

== Personnel ==
Credits for This Time adapted from Allmusic.

- Scott Ahaus – mixing
- Karen Anderson – vocals (background)
- Craig Bauer – engineer
- Athena Cage – vocals (background)
- Yvonne Cage – vocals (background)
- Kevin "KD" Davis – mixing
- Andre Debourg – engineer
- Delegations – vocals (background)
- Kevin Evans – executive producer
- Kay Fingers – programming, multi-instruments, producer, engineer, vocal arrangement, mixing
- Kenny Flav - Keyboards, producer
- Jerry Flowers – keyboards, drum programming
- Annette Hardeman – vocals (background)
- Gabriel Hardeman – vocals (background)
- Karl Heilbron – engineer
- Charlene Holloway – vocals (background)
- Paula Holloway – vocals (background)
- Robert Jazayeri – producer
- Gercy Johnson – guitar
- Marc Kinchen – producer
- Carla Leighton – package Design
- Ken Lewis – Engineer
- Henry Marquez – Creative director
- Sean "Mystro" Mather – producer
- Joseph Pluchino – photography
- Matt Prock – engineer
- Chantay Savage – vocals, vocals (background), executive producer, vocal arrangement
- Keith Sweat – producer
- Mark VanBork – engineer
- Dave Way – mixing
- Daniel Weatherspoon – keyboards, programming, producer, rhythm arrangements
- Michael Weatherspoon – cymbals
- Jeffrey "Woody" Woodruff – engineer

== Charts ==
Chart (1999)	Peak position
US Heatseekers Albums (Billboard)	21
US Top R&B/Hip-Hop Albums (Billboard)	56
