= Straight Out the Sewer =

Single by Das EFX

from the album Dead Serious
- Released: November 19, 1992
- Genre: Hip hop, East Coast hip hop, G-funk
- Length: 3:22
- Label: East West/Atlantic
- Songwriters: A. Weston, W. Hines, C. Charity, D. Lynch
- Producer: Solid Scheme

Das EFX singles chronology
"Mic Checka" (1992)	"Straight Out the Sewer" (1992)	"Freakit" (1993)

"Straight Out the Sewer" (sometimes known as "Straight from the Sewer") is a song by American hip hop group Das EFX recorded for their debut album Dead Serious (1992). The song was released as the third and final single for the album in November 1992.

== Track listings ==
12", Vinyl

1. "Straight Out the Sewer" (Remix #1) - 3:36
2. "Straight Out the Sewer" (Remix #2) - 3:42
3. "Straight Out the Sewer" (Dub) - 3:42
4. "Hard Like a Criminal" (Censored - Bonus Track Not on LP) - 4:04
5. "Straight Out the Sewer" (LP Version) - 3:22

12", Promo

1. "Straight Out the Sewer" (Remix #1 - Clean Version) - 3:36
2. "Straight Out the Sewer" (Remix #2) - 3:42
3. "Straight Out the Sewer" (Dub) - 3:42
4. "Straight Out the Sewer" (LP Version) - 3:22
5. "East Coast" (Remix) - 4:16
6. "East Coast" (Dub) - 4:16
7. "Hard Like a Criminal" (Uncensored - Bonus Track Not on LP) - 4:04
8. "East Coast" (LP Version) - 4:29

CD, Maxi-Single

1. "Straight Out the Sewer" (Remix #1) - 3:37
2. "Straight Out the Sewer" (Remix #2) - 3:42
3. "East Coast" (Remix) - 4:16
4. "Hard Like a Criminal (Censored - Bonus Track Not on LP) - 4:05

== Personnel ==
Information taken from Discogs.

- additional production – Solid Scheme (Chris Charity, Derek Lynch)
- arranging – Solid Scheme
- executive production – EPMD
- guitar – Bobby Sitchran
- production – Solid Scheme
- remixing – Solid Scheme

== Chart performance ==
Chart (1992)	Peak position
U.S. Hot Dance Music/Maxi-Singles Sales	35
U.S. Hot R&B Singles	66
U.S. Hot Rap Singles	3
