= Kym Sims =

American singer (born 1966)

- Born: December 28, 1966 (age 59); Chicago, U.S.
- Genres: House; dance
- Occupations: Singer; songwriter
- Years active: 1991–present

Kym Sims (born December 28, 1966) is an American singer whose biggest success came outside her home market, most notably the United Kingdom and Scandinavia. Sims began her career as an advertising jingle singer before breaking through into the dance music market. Following a battle with alcohol addiction, Sims returned to the Billboard Dance charts, reaching number 6 with "Turn It Up" in 2017.

== Career ==
Working with record producer Steve "Silk" Hurley, Sims' dance anthem "Too Blind to See It" enjoyed particular success in the United Kingdom, where it spent 12 weeks on the UK Singles Chart in 1991–1992, peaking at number five. Her 1992 hit single "Take My Advice" was also a hit in the United Kingdom, peaking at number 13 on the UK Singles Chart. It was also a club hit. The same year she had a more modest hit with "A Little Bit More". Her album Too Blind to See It peaked at number 39 in the UK Albums Chart. The album was produced by Hurley, with co-production credits shared with E-Smoove and 4 time Grammy Award winner Maurice Joshua.

In 1995, she released "I Must Be Free". In 1996, she released "We Gotta Love", which was her last single to be released on CD or vinyl. In 1998 she provided the lead vocals for "Keep On Groovin'" by One Vision under the alias Shimma. In 2000 she released another single, "Just Can't Get Enough".

In 2013, Sims worked with producer Maurice Joshua on an upcoming CD and planned tour dates. She released a single titled "Good Morning". On March 21, 2014, Sims, released "One of Those Nights". On May 13, 2014, she released "Won't Do That" with Unique2Rhythm. The next year Sims released singles including "When U Look", "Take My Advice (The 2015 Remixes) Part 1 and 2", "Move Your Feet", "Ain't Havin' It" and "Pit of My Heart".

In 2016, Sims released the tribute single "Deep in the City (The Remixes)". It featured remixes by Paul Goodyear, Leo Frappier/Phil B, Tweaka Turner, Louie Gomez, Melo Blanco, Paul Hawkins, Gifted Souls (Joe Smooth/Craig Loftis) and Deejay Paco DuBois. The following year, Sims regrouped with her G.M. Crew and recorded her follow up single "Turn It Up!". This was her second release on her own label, Diva Down Records, and became available April 4, 2017. Sims planned tour dates in the US and UK to support the release of "Turn It Up" in 2017.

In 2019, Sims released the "Dance Floor EP" a limited edition 12" bright pink vinyl record with a matching sleeve. With mixes from Scott Featherstone, Dez Ford, Lee Pennington, Late Night Dub Addict and Hall North. With early support from: Nicky Trax, Victor Simonelli, Sy Sez, Russell Ruckman, Honey Dijon and Danny Howells.

In July 2022, Sims announced she was working on a new studio album; her first since Too Blind to See It. Among the songs planned for the album is a cover of CeCe Peniston's "Keep On Walkin'", a song Sims originally planned to include on her debut album.

== Songwriting ==
Sims co-wrote one of CeCe Peniston's biggest hits, "Keep On Walkin'". In addition Sims wrote the R&B hit "Good Morning" performed by Tene Williams and produced by Maurice Joshua. Other songs written by Sims include "Crazy" performed by Jamie Loring. Sims wrote her own 2000 release "Just Can't Get Enough" under the Music Plant Label.

Sims has written new material which was slated for release in 2013 and 2014, including "Good Morning", "Move Your Feet", "One of Those Nights", and "Won't Do That".

== Discography ==
Having debuted at number 22 on the UK Singles Chart, "Too Blind to See It" entered the chart's top ten four weeks later at number seven. The song rose to its highest position of number five, where it remained for two weeks. One more week in the top ten followed, then two more in the lower Top 40, before the song left the higher region of the UK Singles Chart.

"Too Blind to See It" was released on the Atco record label and was certified silver by the British Phonographic Industry. It was included on an album of the same name, which peaked at number 39 on the UK Albums Chart later in 1992. This was the only top-ten hit for Kym Sims in the United Kingdom.

"I Must Be Free" was also featured on Dance Mix USA Volume 3. While a few of her songs have been featured on various dance compilation albums, this particular collection was significant because it peaked at number 71 on the Billboard 200 albums chart, which makes it the only album featuring a Sims solo recording to register on that chart.

=== Studio albums ===
Title	Release	Peak chart positions
Title	Release	UK
Too Blind to See It	April 18, 1992	39

=== Singles ===
List of singles, with selected chart positions.
Title	Year	Peak chart positions			
Title	Year	US	US Dance	AUS	UK
"Too Blind to See It"	1991	38	5	161	5
"Take My Advice"	1992	86	5	123	13
"A Little Bit More"	1992	—	—	—	30
"I Must Be Free"	1995	—	6	—	—
"We Gotta Love"	1996	—	9	—	58
"One of Those Nights"	2014	—	—	—	—
"Deep in the City"	2016	—	—	—	—
"Turn It Up"	2017	—	6	—	—

== TV appearances ==
- Top of the Pops (UK): (1991–92) Sims performed "Too Blind To See It".
- Club MTV: (1992) Sims performed "Too Blind To See It".
- Early Edition: Season 3, Episode 16 "Number One with a Bullet" (1999) - Sims made a brief appearance as a hotel concierge.
