= Come Around (Chantay Savage song) =

Single by Chantay Savage

from the album This Time
- Released: June 11, 1999
- Genre: R&B
- Label: RCA Records
- Songwriters: Athena Cage, Jerry Flowers, Keith Sweat
- Producer: Keith Sweat

Chantay Savage singles chronology
"Reminding Me (Of Sef)" (1997)	"Come Around" (1999)	"My Oh My" (1999)

Music video
- "Come Around" on YouTube

"Come Around" is the title of a R&B single by Chantay Savage. It was the lead single from her album This Time and the single was released on June 11, 1999. The week the single was released it was the top debuting single on the Billboard R&B chart.

== Chart positions ==
Chart (1999)	Peak position
U.S. Billboard Hot R&B/Hip-Hop Singles & Tracks	62
