= Baknaffek =

Single by Das EFX

from the album Straight Up Sewaside
- Released: March 3, 1994
- Recorded: 1993
- Genre: Hip hop
- Length: 3:34
- Label: EastWest
- Songwriters: Das EFX; Chris Charity; Derek Lynch
- Producers: Chris Charity; Derek Lynch

Das EFX singles chronology
"Freakit" (1993)	"Baknaffek" (1994)	"Kaught in da Ak" (1994)

"Baknaffek" is a song co-written and performed by American hip hop group Das EFX, issued as the second single from their second studio album Straight Up Sewaside. The song samples "People" by Graham Central Station; "Buffalo Gals" by Malcolm McLaren and the World's Famous Supreme Team; and "Cummin' at Cha" by EPMD. It peaked at #44 on the Billboard rap chart in 1994.

== Chart positions ==
Chart (1994)	Peak position
US Dance/Electronic Singles Sales (Billboard)	31
US Hot Rap Singles (Billboard)	44
US Hot R&B/Hip-Hop Singles & Tracks (Billboard)	98
