= Don't Let It Go to Your Head (Chantay Savage song) =

"Don't Let It Go To Your Head"

Single by Chantay Savage

from the album Here We Go...
- Released: January 25, 1994
- Recorded: 1992–1993
- Genre: R&B
- Label: RCA Records
- Songwriter(s): Steve "Silk" Hurley, Jamie Principle, Chantay Savage, Marc Williams

Chantay Savage singles chronology
"Betcha'll Never Find" (1993)	"Don't Let It Go To Your Head" (1994)	"It's a Summer Thang" (1994)

"Don't Let It Go To Your Head" is the title of a top twenty dance single by Chantay Savage. The song is one of Savage's biggest dance hits to date peaking at number fourteen on the Billboard Dance singles chart.

== Tracklisting ==
Don't Let It Go To Your Head / Give It To Ya

1.) Don't Let It Go To Your Head (Silk In The House 7") [4:25]
2.) Don't Let It Go To Your Head (Silk In The House 12") [7:25]
3.) Don't Let It Go To Your Head (Album Version) [4:09]
4.) Give It To Ya (Radio Edit) [3:55]
5.) Give It To Ya (In Da Soul Mix) [4:21]

== Chart positions ==
Chart (1994)	Peak position
U.S. Billboard Hot R&B Singles	80
U.S. Billboard Hot Dance Club Songs	14
U.S. Billboard Hot Dance Singles Sales	28
