= MC's Act Like They Don't Know =

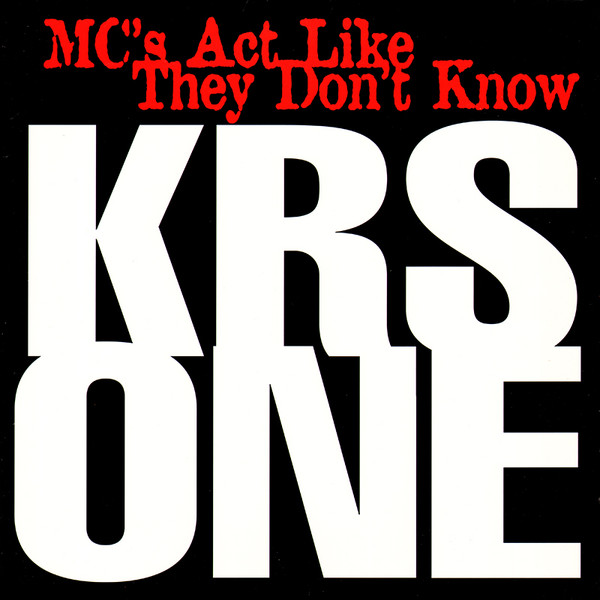

Single by KRS-One

from the album KRS One
- B-side: "Represent the Real Hip Hop"
- Released: August 28, 1995
- Recorded: 1995
- Studio: D&D Recording
- Genre: Hip-hop
- Length: 4:44
- Label: Jive
- Songwriters: Lawrence Parker; Chris Martin
- Producer: DJ Premier

KRS-One singles chronology
| "Return of the Boom Bap" (1994) | "MC's Act Like They Don't Know" (1995) | "Rappaz R. N. Dainja" (1995) |

Music video
- "MC's Act Like They Don't Know" on YouTube

Professional ratings
Review scores
| Source | Rating |
|---|---|
| AllMusic | 2.5/5 stars |

"MC's Act Like They Don't Know" is a hip-hop song written and performed by American rapper KRS-One. It was released on August 28, 1995, via Jive Records as the lead single from his second solo studio album, KRS One (1995). Recording sessions took place at D&D Studios in New York. Production was helmed by DJ Premier. In the United States, the song peaked at numbers 43 and 57 on the Cash Box Top 100 and Billboard Hot 100 charts, number 35 on the Hot R&B/Hip-Hop Songs, number 59 on the R&B/Hip-Hop Airplay, number 9 on the Hot Rap Songs, and topped the Dance Singles Sales charts. It also made it to number 84 on the UK singles chart and number 12 on the UK Dance Singles Chart. The song's lyrics criticize rappers who have studio hits but cannot perform well live.

== Track listing ==
12" Vinyl
| No. | Title | Writer(s) | Producer(s) | Length |
|---|---|---|---|---|
| 1. | "MC's Act Like They Don't Know" (LP Version) | Lawrence Parker; Chris Martin | DJ Premier | 4:44 |
| 2. | "MC's Act Like They Don't Know" (Instrumental) | | DJ Premier | 4:44 |
| 3. | "Represent the Real Hip Hop (Street Version)" (featuring Das EFX) | Parker; Andre Weston; William Hines | Showbiz | 3:20 |
| 4. | "Represent the Real Hip Hop (Clean Version)" (featuring Das EFX) | Parker; Weston; Hines | Showbiz | 3:20 |
| 5. | "Represent the Real Hip Hop" (Instrumental) | | Showbiz | 2:50 |

== Personnel ==
- Lawrence "KRS-One" Parker – vocals
- Christopher "DJ Premier" Martin – producer & mixing (tracks: 1, 2)
- Norty Cotto – engineering (tracks: 1, 2)
- Andre "Krazy Drayz" Weston – vocals (tracks: 3, 4)
- Willie "Skoob" Hines – vocals (tracks: 3, 4)
- Rodney "Showbiz" LeMay – producer (tracks: 3–5)
- Gordon "Commissioner Gordon" Williams – engineering (tracks: 3–5)
- Tom Brick – mastering
- Maria Valencia – design
- Ron Croudy – design
- Scott "DJ Scott La Rock" Sterling – overseen by

== Charts ==
| Chart (1995) | Peak position |
|---|---|
| UK Singles (Official Charts) | 84 |
| UK Dance (Official Charts) | 12 |
| US Billboard Hot 100 | 57 |
| US Hot R&B/Hip-Hop Songs (Billboard) | 35 |
| US R&B/Hip-Hop Airplay (Billboard) | 59 |
| US Hot Rap Songs (Billboard) | 9 |
| US Cash Box Top 100 | 43 |
