= Mic Checka =

1992 single by Das EFX

Single by Das EFX

from the album Dead Serious
- Released: July 16, 1992
- Genre: Hip hop, East Coast hip hop
- Length: 4:54
- Label: East West/Atlantic
- Songwriters: A. Weston, W. Hines, C. Charity, D. Lynch
- Producer: Solid Scheme

Das EFX singles chronology
"They Want EFX" (1992)	"Mic Checka" (1992)	"Straight Out the Sewer" (1992)

"Mic Checka" is a song by American hip hop group Das EFX recorded for their debut album Dead Serious (1992). The song was released as the second single for the album in July 1992.

== Track listings ==
12", vinyl

1. "Mic Checka" (Remix) - 5:08
2. "Mic Checka" (Remix Instrumental) - 5:10
3. "Mic Checka" (LP Version) - 4:55
4. "Jussumen" (Remix) - 4:54
5. "Jussumen" (Remix Instrumental) - 4:56

CD

1. "Mic Checka" (Edit) - 4:06
2. "Mic Checka" (Remix Edit) - 4:10
3. "Mic Checka" (LP Version) - 4:52
4. "Mic Checka" (Remix) - 5:07

== Personnel ==
Information taken from Discogs.

- executive production: EPMD
- production: Solid Scheme (Chris Charity, Derek Lynch)
- remixing: Pete Rock & C.L. Smooth, Solid Scheme

== Charts ==
Chart (1992)	Peak position
U.S. Hot Dance Music/Maxi-Singles Sales	10
U.S. Hot R&B Singles	22
U.S. Hot Rap Singles	1

== Covers ==
The song was covered by Methodman and Redman as "Cheka", though with largely new lyrics, for their album Blackout!.
