= I Will Survive (Doin' It My Way) =

Studio album by Chantay Savage
- Released: March 30, 1996
- Recorded: 1995–1996
- Genre: R&B
- Length: 67:41
- Label: RCA
- Producers: Bob Antoine; Andre Evans; Grand Puba; Steve "Silk" Hurley; Tim & Bob; Mass Order; Harve Pierre; Chucky Thompson; Chris Liggio

Chantay Savage chronology
| Here We Go... (1993) | I Will Survive (Doin' It My Way) (1996) | This Time (1999) |

Singles from I Will Survive (Doin' It My Way)
- 1. "I Will Survive" Released: January 23, 1996; 2. "Baby: Drive Me Crazy" Released: May 21, 1996

I Will Survive (Doin' It My Way) is the second studio album by American R&B singer Chantay Savage. It was released by RCA Records on March 30, 1996, in the United States. Savage worked with several producers on the album, including Tim & Bob, Kay Fingers, Steve "Silk" Hurley, Grand Puba, Chucky Thompson, and others. I Will Survive (Doin' It My Way) peaked at number 14 on the US Billboard Top R&B/Hip-Hop Albums. The album's lead single, a downtempo cover of Gloria Gaynor's "I Will Survive", peaked at number five on the US Hot R&B/Hip-Hop Songs chart.

== Critical reception ==
Professional ratings
Review scores
| Source | Rating |
|---|---|
| AllMusic | 3/5 stars |
| Cash Box | (favorable) |
| Muzik | 4/5 stars |

Gil L. Robertson IV of Cash Box praised Savage's vocal performance for delivering the "spirit and warmth behind R&B music" and her musical team providing a wide array of "soultry R&B to bump and grind grooves", calling it "an excellent project and a great follow up to her debut, a gem of a record that went widely unrecognized." Jacqueline Springer of Muzik critiqued that Savage's vocal tones can range from appropriate at times to "grating as Cilla Black at fever pitch", but praised her for delivering material with "enough panache" to reach the general public, concluding that Savage makes "modern soul which doesn't sound too fashionable or retrospective."

== Track listing ==
| No. | Title | Writer(s) | Producer(s) | Length |
|---|---|---|---|---|
| 1. | "Alright" (Interlude) | Chantay Savage; Craig Simpkins | Kay Fingers | 1:15 |
| 2. | "I Will Survive" | Dino Fekaris; Freddie Perren | Steve "Silk" Hurley | 6:12 |
| 3. | "All Night All Day" | Eugene Hanes; Billy Nichols; Nicole Rene; Marc Valentine; Allen Williams | Mass Order | 3:58 |
| 4. | "Baby: Drive Me Crazy" | Jeff Carter; Herbie Hancock; Harve Pierre; Savage; Chucky Thompson | Thompson | 4:55 |
| 5. | "Pillow Talk" | Aaron Pettigrew; Shabazz Curtis | Kay Fingers | 4:54 |
| 6. | "I'm Willing" | Andre Evans; Bob Antoine | Evans; Antoine | 4:30 |
| 7. | "Love Need Want" | Bobby Sanders; Dorothea Joyce; Jay Lincoln; Wartell | Grand Puba; Chris "Suga" Liggio (co.) | 5:05 |
| 8. | "All of My Love" | Tim Kelley; Bob Robinson | Tim & Bob | 4:48 |
| 9. | "90 In the Red" (Interlude) | Lonnie Lynn, Jr.; Simpkins | Fingers | 1:24 |
| 10. | "Turned Away" | Kelley; Robinson | Tim & Bob | 4:25 |
| 11. | "Brown Sugar" | Pettigrew; Franklin Williams, Jr.; Curtis; Shawn Lewis | Fingers | 4:10 |
| 12. | "Let's Do It Right" | Savage; Simpkins; Regina Charles | Fingers | 5:15 |
| 13. | "Body" | Savage; Carter; Hurley | Hurley | 4:54 |
| 14. | "Callin'" | Savage; Carter; Hurley | Hurley | 7:18 |
| 15. | "Do You My Way" | Savage; Simpkins; Charles | Fingers | 4:41 |

Sample credits

- "All Night All Day" contains a sample of "If It Don't Turn You On" as performed by B. T. Express.
- "Love Need Want" embodies portions of the composition "Love Lines Angels and Rhymes" as written by Dorothea Joyce.

== Personnel ==
- Scott Ahaus – mixing
- Bob Antione – arranger, engineer, keyboards, producer, programming
- Daniela Barcelo – design
- Craig Bauer – mixing
- Below Zero – Vocal Arrangement, Vocals (Background)
- Common Sense – rap
- Lane Craven – engineer
- Jerald Daemyon – Violin
- Tony Dawsey – Mastering
- Joey Donetello – engineer
- Andre Evans – arranger, keyboards, producer, programming
- Kevin Evans – executive producer, producer
- K. Fingers – engineer, mixing, producer, programming
- Rick Fritz – mixing
- Derrick Garrett – engineer
- Michael Gilbert – engineer
- Grand Puba – producer
- Loren Hill – drum programming
- Steve "Silk" Hurley – arranger, executive producer, guitar, keyboards, mixing, producer, programming, Vocal Arrangement
- Tim Kelley – producer, arranger, design, drums, keyboards
- Chris Liggio – keyboards, producer
- Carlton Lynn – assistant engineer
- Glen Marchese – assistant engineer, mixing assistant
- Tony Maserati – engineer, mixing
- Mass Order – mixing, producer
- Mike Mikoola – guitar
- David Mitchell – engineer
- Jacqueline Murphy – Art Direction
- Wes Naprstek – engineer
- Harve Pierre – producer
- Brian Remenick – assistant engineer
- Bob Robinson – arranger, keyboards
- Chantay Savage – executive producer, producer, Vocal Arrangement, Vocals (Background)
- Ken Schubert – engineer
- Kenyon Scott – assistant engineer
- Antonio Smallios – mixing
- Scott Steiner – assistant engineer, mixing assistant
- Chucky Thompson – producer
- Valentine – drum programming, keyboards
- Marc Van Bork – engineer
- Russell Ward – Photography
- Steve Weeder – engineer, mixing
- Jimmy Wright – Fender Rhodes, Organ, Piano

== Charts ==
| Chart (1996) | Peak position |
|---|---|
| US Billboard 200 | 106 |
| US Top R&B/Hip-Hop Albums (Billboard) | 14 |
