= The Colour of Love (The Reese Project song) =

Single by The Reese Project

from the album Faith Hope and Clarity
- Released: 1992
- Recorded: 1992
- Genre: Electronica/Deep House
- Length: 5:40
- Label: Giant/Warner
- Songwriter(s): Kevin "Reese" Saunderson; Ann Saunderson
- Producer(s): Kevin "Reese" Saunderson; Mike Banks

"The Colour of Love" is a 1992 Techno House song recorded, written and produced by The Reese Project, which consisted of Kevin "Reese" Saunderson, his wife Ann Saunderson, Michael Nanton, and Rachel Kapp, who was the lead singer on the track, which dealt with racial unity. The single, taken from the Giant/Warner album Faith Hope and Clarity, reached number one on the Billboard Hot Dance/Club Play chart on October 3, 1992, and spent two weeks there.

== Track listing ==
CD maxi (US)

1. "The Colour Of Love (Underground Resistance 7" Mix)" (4:41)
2. "The Colour Of Love (Underground Resistance Jazzed Up Mix)" (4:45)
3. "The Colour Of Love (Underground Resistance 12" Mix)" (5:15)
4. "The Colour Of Love (Deep Reese Mix)" (5:47)
5. "The Colour Of Love (Marc Kinchen Deep Dub Remix)" (6:36)
6. "The Colour Of Love (Juan Atkins Techno Remix)" (5:19)

== Charts ==
=== Weekly charts ===
Chart (1992)	Peak position
UK Singles (OCC)	52
US Hot Dance Club Play (Billboard)	1

Chart (1994)	Peak position
Scotland (OCC)	58
UK Singles (OCC)	55
UK Dance (OCC)	2
UK Club Chart (Music Week)	1

=== Year-end charts ===
Chart (1994)	Position
UK Club Chart (Music Week)	62

== See also ==
- List of number-one dance singles of 1992 (U.S.)
