= Young, Black, Rich and Famous =

Studio album by M-Doc
- Released: October 27, 1998
- Recorded: 1998
- Genre: R&B hip hop
- Length: 53:51
- Label: Alexia; InDaSoul
- Producer: M-Doc; N.O.I.D. T.J. Jere MC; C-Breeze; Ronnie Tyson; Ed Strickland

M-Doc chronology
M. Doc Wit Stevio: C'mon Getcha Groove On (1995)	Young, Black, Rich and Famous (1998)

Singles from Young, Black, Rich and Famous
- 1. "Free"

Compact disc

Professional ratings
Review scores
Source	Rating
Allmusic	3/5 stars

Young, Black, Rich and Famous is the third album by the rap artist, producer and songwriter M-Doc.

The set felt somewhere between rap and R&B, and its ambitions were probably best realized on the lead single, which was a cover of the Deniece Williams' number one hit from 1977 "Free" M-Doc's version of the song released as the lead single scored minor chart success on the U.S. Hot R&B/Hip-Hop Singles, where it peaked at number sixty-one in 1998.

To the album contributed several other performers. Among them, the singer CeCe Peniston (on the track "Keep It Real"), with whom M-Doc collaborated on the singles produced for her ("Searchin'", "I'm Not Over You" and "He Loves Me 2").

== Track listing ==
No.	Title	Writer(s)	Featured artist(s)	Length
1.	"Intro"	M-Doc, Elroy Smith		1:02
2.	"Revenge"	L.Smith, M-Doc, K.Little	Rhyme	4:19
3.	"Keep It Real"	M-Doc, T.Armstrong, R.Smith-also Furious 5, S.Robinson	CeCe Peniston	4:49
4.	"You Showed Your Ace"	M-Doc, Ernest Wilson		4:45
5.	"Put Me On"	M-Doc	Cristina	4:36
6.	"I Just Wanna Be"	M-Doc	Jessie Campbell	5:18
7.	"The Great Escape"	M-Doc, Elroy Smith, Tanjila Pettis		4:54
8.	"Free"	Deniece Williams, Nathan Watts, Susaye Green, Henry Redd	Cristina	4:48
9.	"Young, Black, Rich and Famous Interlude"	M-Doc, Jere MC		1:21
10.	"Can We Got Down?"			4:16
11.	"Drinks on Me"	M-Doc, C-Breeze, Fredrick J. Taerrin, Richard Rudolph, Minnie Ripperton		4:25
12.	"We Do It Like That"	Scott Hammond, Persan Love, C.Mitchell, M-Doc, D.A. Smart, T.Parker		4:57
13.	"Keep Doin' Whatcha Doin'"	M-Doc, K.Little, Elroy Smith	Rhyme	4:15
Total length:				53:51

"Keep It Real"
M-Doc featuring CeCe Peniston

== Credits and personnel ==
- M-Doc - lead vocal, writer, producer, co-producer, executive producer, programming
- Jessie Campbell - lead vocal
- Cristina - lead vocal, back vocal
- Rhyme - back vocal
- CeCe Peniston - back vocal
- Shorty Gage - additional rap vocal
- Greg Gibbs - additional back vocal
- Blah Zae Blah - vocal
- D.A. Smart - vocal, writer
- Twista - vocal
- L.Smith - writer

- K.Little - writer
- Elroy Smith - writer
- T.Armstrong - writer
- R.Smith-also Furious 5 - writer
- Tanjila Pettis - writer
- S.Robinson - writer
- Ernest Wilson - writer
- Deniece Williams - writer
- Nathan Watts - writer
- Susaye Green - writer
- Henry Redd - writer
- Fredrick J. Taerrin - writer
- Richard Rudolph - writer
- Minnie Riperton - writer
- Scott Hammond - writer
- Persan Love - writer
- C.Mitchell - writer
- T.Parker - writer
- Lemoyne Alexander - instruments, producer
- Ant Dub - vocal producer
- N.O.I.D. - producer
- T.J. - producer
- Jere MC - producer
- C-Breeze - producer, writer
- Keith Henderson - guitar
- Ronnie Tyson - piano, Rhodes keyboards, guitar, back vocal, additional producer
- Lamar Jones - bass
- Steve Maestro - scratches
- Steve Weeder - engineer
- Steve Johnson - assistant engineer
- Matt Prock - mix
- Larry Sturm - mix
- Joey "The Don" Donatello - mix
- Ed Strickland - associate executive producer
- FPD3 and Jeff Weese - art direction, design
- Indasoul Songs (ASCAP) - publisher
- Alexia Music (Broadcast Music Incorporated) - publisher
- Nydrin Music (Broadcast Music Incorporated) - publisher
- Exactly Different (ASCAP) - publisher
