= Microphone Master =

1995 song by Das EFX

- Cover art for the official remix

Single by Das EFX

from the album Hold It Down
- Released: January 30, 1996
- Genre: Hip hop
- Length: 4:31
- Label: East West Records
- Songwriters: Andre Weston, William Hines, Osten Harvey Jr.
- Producer: Easy Mo Bee

Das EFX singles chronology
"Real Hip-Hop" (1995)	"Microphone Master" (1996)	"Rap Scholar" (1998)

"Microphone Master" is a song by American hip hop group Das EFX. It is the second single from their third studio album, Hold It Down (1995). The song was produced by Easy Mo Bee. The official remix of the song features hip hop group Mobb Deep and was also released in 1995.

== Charts ==
Chart (1996)	Peak position
US Billboard Hot 100	86
US Hot R&B/Hip-Hop Songs (Billboard)	39
US Hot Rap Songs (Billboard)	5
US Cash Box Top 100	80
