= Real Hip-Hop =

1995 single by Das EFX

- Maxi single cover art

Single by Das EFX

from the album Hold It Down
- B-side: "No Diggedy"
- Released: September 12, 1995
- Genre: Hip hop
- Length: 4:09
- Label: East West
- Songwriters: Andre Weston, William Hines, Christopher Martin
- Producer: DJ Premier

Das EFX singles chronology
"Kaught in da Ak" (1994)	"Real Hip-Hop" (1995)	"Microphone Master" (1996)

Music video
- "Real Hip-Hop" on YouTube

"Real Hip-Hop" is a song by American hip hop group Das EFX. It is the lead single from their third studio album, Hold It Down (1995). The song was produced by DJ Premier. Three remixes to the song have been released. Among the artists are producers Pete Rock and Solid Scheme and rapper PMD.

== Track listings ==
Information taken from Discogs.

A-Side

1. "Real Hip-Hop" (Premier's LP Version) - 4:09
2. "Real Hip-Hop" (Pete Rock Remix) - 4:18
3. "Real Hip-Hop" (Solid Scheme Remix) - 4:12
4. "Real Hip-Hop" (PMD Remix) - 4:32

B-Side

1. "No Diggedy" (LP Version) - 4:02
2. "Real Hip-Hop" (LP Instrumental) - 4:09
3. "Real Hip-Hop" (Pete Rock Remix Instrumental) - 4:18
4. "Real Hip-Hop" (Acapella) - 3:50

== Charts ==
Chart (1995)	Peak position
US Billboard Hot 100	61
US Hot R&B/Hip-Hop Songs (Billboard)	48
US Hot Rap Songs (Billboard)	10
US Cash Box Top 100	39
