= Take Me Back to Love Again =

Single by Kathy Sledge

from the album Heart
- Released: 1992
- Genre: Dance
- Length: 3:55
- Label: Epic
- Songwriter(s): Kenny Harris; Mark Holden
- Producer(s): Charles Farrar; Troy Taylor

Kathy Sledge singles chronology
"Take Me Back to Love Again" (1992)	"Heart" (1992)

Music video
- "Take Me Back to Love Again" on YouTube

"Take Me Back to Love Again" is a song by American singer-songwriter Kathy Sledge. It was written by Kenny Harris and Mark Holden, and was released in 1992 by Epic Records as the first single from Sledge's first solo album, Heart (1992). The producers were Charles Farrar and Troy Taylor. The single went to number-one on the US Billboard dance chart for one week. It did not make the Billboard Hot 100, but went to number 24 on the Billboard soul singles chart. In Europe, it peaked at number 62 on the UK Singles Chart, number 12 on the UK Dance Singles chart and number five on the UK Club Chart.

== Critical reception ==
Craig Lytle from AllMusic noted that the song "has a progressive rhythm with flashbacks of disco". Larry Flick from Billboard magazine wrote, "This festive, garage-vibed houser benefits from the maturing remix hand of Roger S., who takes it through six strong variations." He added, "Of course, the real reason to check this jam out is Sledge's instantly recognizable voice, which sounds as powerful as it did on classics like 'We Are Family'."

John Martinucci from the Gavin Report said, "I find my ears gravitating toward the LP edit because it presents her soft-smooth vocals in a Jazz/Fusion setting. Check it out." Andy Beevers from Music Week commented, "Kathy Sledge of Sister Sledge fame has returned with a bang up-to-date single, the classy Roger Sanchez mixed 'Take Me Back to Love'. Import copies have already been filling garage-orientated dancefloors and the track is now getting a UK release."

== Impact and legacy ==
In 1995, British DJ Sister Bliss selected it as one of "the tracks that mean most to her", saying, "This is a bit of a handbag one – a big Northern tune. It has a tinkly piano – the piano riff is one of the nicest things about it. It's an unpretentious little tune Jon Pleased Wimmin used to play it all the time – it brings back memories of the Bar Industria at four in the morning and putting my hands in the air. It's infectious happy."

== Track listing ==
- 7" single, UK (1992)
1. "Take Me Back to Love Again" (Radio Remix) – 3:55
2. "Take Me Back to Love Again" (Album Version) – 3:59
- 12", US (1992)
1. "Take Me Back to Love Again" (Shelter Me Mix) – 6:48
2. "Take Me Back to Love Again" (Soundshaft Mix) – 6:15
3. "Take Me Back to Love Again" (Soundshaft Beats) – 3:00
4. "Take Me Back to Love Again" (Roger's Favorite Mix) – 5:30
5. "Take Me Back to Love Again" (Preston's Piano Mix) – 5:32
6. "Take Me Back to Love Again" (Raw Mix) – 5:00
- CD maxi, UK (1992)
1. "Take Me Back to Love Again" (7" Version) – 3:55
2. "Take Me Back to Love Again" (Back To Romance) – 5:00
3. "Take Me Back to Love Again" (12" Remix) – 5:15
4. "Take Me Back to Love Again" (Instrumental) – 4:00
5. "Take Me Back to Love Again" (Album Version) – 3:59

== Charts ==
Chart (1992)	Peak position
UK Singles (OCC)	62
UK Dance (Music Week)	12
UK Club Chart (Music Week)	5
US Hot Dance Club Play (Billboard)	1
US Hot R&B/Hip-Hop Songs (Billboard)	24

== See also ==
- List of number-one dance singles of 1992 (U.S.)
