= Rappaz R. N. Dainja =

Single by KRS-One

from the album KRS One
- Released: November 29, 1995
- Recorded: 1995
- Genre: East Coast hip hop
- Label: Jive
- Songwriters: Lawrence Parker; Chris Martin
- Producer: DJ Premier

KRS-One singles chronology
"MC's Act Like They Don't Know" (1995)	"Rappaz R. N. Dainja" (1995)	"1, 2 Pass It" (1995)

Music video
- "Rappaz R.N. Dainja" on YouTube

"Rappaz R. N. Dainja" is a hip hop song written and performed by American rapper KRS-One. It was released on November 29, 1995 via Jive Records as the second single from his second solo studio album KRS One. Production was handled by DJ Premier, who used a sample from O.C.'s "Time's Up". The song peaked at number 47 on the UK singles chart and number 20 on the Dance Singles Chart in the United Kingdom. An accompanying music video was directed by Brian "Black" Luvar.

== Track listing ==
CD
No.	Title	Producer(s)	Length
1.	"Rappaz R. N. Dainja" (Chain Me To The Gear Mix)
2.	"Rappaz R. N. Dainja" (Kenny Parker Mix)
3.	"Rappaz R. N. Dainja" (LP Version)	DJ Premier
4.	"Sound of da Police" (LP Version)	Showbiz

12" vinyl
No.	Title	Writer(s)	Producer(s)	Length
1.	"Rappaz R. N. Dainja" (LP Version)	Lawrence Parker; Chris Martin	DJ Premier
2.	"Rappaz R. N. Dainja" (Kenny Parker Mix)	Parker; Martin	DJ Premier
3.	"Ah - Yeah" (Mellow Vibe Mix)	Parker	KRS-One
4.	"Sound of da Police" (LP Version)	Parker; Rodney LeMay	Showbiz

Sample credits

- "Rappaz R. N. Dainja" (LP Version) and (Kenny Parker Mix) contain a sample from "Times Up" written by Omar Credle and Anthony Best as recorded by O.C.
- "Sound of da Police" contains a sample of "Inside-Looking Out" written by Alan Lomax, John Lomax, Bryan Chandler and Eric Burdon performed by Grand Funk Railroad

== Personnel ==
- Lawrence "KRS-One" Parker – lyrics and vocals, producer "Ah - Yeah (Mellow Vibe Mix)", mixing "Ah - Yeah (Mellow Vibe Mix)" and "Sound of da Police (LP Version)"
- Chris "DJ Premier" Martin – producer "Rappaz R. N. Dainja (LP Version)" and "Rappaz R. N. Dainja (Kenny Parker Mix)", mixing "Rappaz R. N. Dainja (LP Version)"
- Eddie Sancho – engineering "Rappaz R. N. Dainja (LP Version)", "Ah - Yeah (Mellow Vibe Mix)" and "Sound of da Police (LP Version)"
- Tom Morello – drums, guitars, bass and remixing "Rappaz R. N. Dainja (Chain Me To The Gear Mix)"
- Brett Eliason – remixing "Rappaz R. N. Dainja (Chain Me To The Gear Mix)"
- David "Dave Rat" Levine – remixing "Rappaz R. N. Dainja (Chain Me To The Gear Mix)"
- Kenny Parker – re-mixing "Rappaz R. N. Dainja (Kenny Parker Mix)"
- "Commissioner" Gordon Williams – co-remixing & engineering "Rappaz R. N. Dainja (Kenny Parker Mix)"
- Rodney "Showbiz" LeMay – producer "Sound of da Police (LP Version)"
- Luis Tineo – engineering assistant "Rappaz R. N. Dainja (LP Version)"
- Chris Roberts – second engineering "Rappaz R. N. Dainja"
- Scott "DJ Scott La Rock" Sterling – overseen by

== Charts ==
Charts (1996)	Peak position
UK Singles (Official Charts)	47
UK Dance (Official Charts)	20
