= Shined on Me =

Single by Praise Cats
- B-side: "Remix"
- Released: 23 December 2002 / 9 May 2005 (UK)
- Genre: House
- Length: 3:44 (UK radio edit)
- Label: Subliminal
- Songwriter: E. Miller
- Producer: E-Smoove

Alternative cover
- French CD single cover

"Shined on Me" is a 2002 house song performed by Praise Cats featuring Andrea Love on vocals. Behind the name Praise Cats is Eric Miller, also known as E-Smoove, who wrote and produced the track.

The song reached No. 1 on the UK Dance Singles Chart in October 2002.

== Track listings ==
CD single - Europe

1. "Shined on Me" (radio edit) — 3:44
2. "Shined on Me" (original E-Smoove vocal mix) — 7:00

CD single - France

1. "Shined on Me" (UK radio edit) — 3:44
2. "Shined on Me" (radio edit) — 3:09
3. "Shined on Me" (original E-Smoove vocal mix) — 7:00
4. "Shined on Me" (Bini + Martini revocal mix) — 7:01

== Charts ==
=== Weekly charts ===
Chart (2002)	Peak position
Belgium (Ultratop 50 Flanders)	7
Belgium (Ultratip Bubbling Under Wallonia)	2
France (SNEP)	23
Italy (FIMI)	47
Netherlands (Single Top 100)	52
Chart (2005)	Peak position
UK Singles (Official Charts)	24

=== Year-end charts ===
Chart (2002)	Position
France (SNEP)	100
