= Freakit =

1993 single by Das EFX

Single by Das EFX

from the album Straight Up Sewaside
- B-side: "Gimme Dat Microphone"
- Released: 1993
- Genre: Hip hop
- Length: 3:18
- Label: EastWest
- Songwriters: Das EFX, Chris Charity, Derek Lynch
- Producers: Chris Charity, Derek Lynch

Das EFX singles chronology
| "Straight Out the Sewer" (1992) | "Freakit" (1993) | "Baknaffek" (1993) |

Music video
- "Freakit" at VH1.com

"Freakit" is a song co-written and performed by American hip hop duo Das EFX, issued as the lead single from their second studio album, Straight Up Sewaside (1993). In 1993, the song reached #1 on the US Billboard dance chart, as well as peaking at #43 on the Billboard Hot 100.

== Music video ==
The official music video for the song was directed by Wayne Isham.

== Charts ==
| Chart (1993) | Peak position |
|---|---|
| US Billboard Hot 100 | 43 |
| US Hot Dance Music/Maxi-Singles Sales (Billboard) | 1 |
| US Hot R&B/Hip-Hop Singles & Tracks (Billboard) | 24 |
| US Hot Rap Singles (Billboard) | 6 |
| US Cash Box Top 100 | 38 |
