= Generation EFX =

Studio album by Das EFX
- Released: March 24, 1998
- Studio: Ian London Studios (East Islip, NY); Music Palace (Hempstead, NY); The Sewer; Mirror Image (Dix Hills, NY); Quad Recording (Times Square, NY); Northshore Soundworks (Long Island, NY); Niles Studio
- Genre: East Coast hip hop
- Length: 50:22
- Label: EastWest Records America
- Producer: PMD (also exec.); Agallah; Mike Lowe; Rashad Smith; Solid Scheme; Tony L.

Das EFX chronology
Hold It Down (1995)	Generation EFX (1998)	How We Do (2003)

Singles from Generation EFX
- 1. "Rap Scholar" Released: 1997

Generation EFX is the fourth studio album by American hip hop duo Das EFX. It was released on March 24, 1998 via EastWest Records America. Production was handled by Agallah, Solid Scheme, Rashad Smith, Mike Lowe, Tony L, and PMD, who also served as executive producer. Unlike the first three Das EFX albums, it features a number of guest appearances from Redman, Agallah, EPMD, Miss Jones, M.O.P., Nocturnal and Teflon. The album debuted and peaked at number 48 on the Billboard 200, selling 22,000 copies in its first week. In its second week of release, the album dropped to number 89 on the Billboard 200, selling 14,000 copies bringing the two week total to 36,000 copies.

== Critical reception ==
Professional ratings
Review scores
Source	Rating
AllMusic	3/5 stars
RapReviews	6/10
The Source	3/5 stars

AllMusic's Stephen Thomas Erlewine called it "a hard-hitting return to form" for the group, noting their trademark sound being "harder and hipper than before", concluding that: "Like all their albums, Generation EFX relies more on style than substance -- not all of the hooks hold, some of the grooves just lie there -- but on the whole, it's their best album since Straight Up Sewaside." In a 2020 retrospective review, Steve 'Flash' Juon of RapReviews wrote that: "The bottom line on "Generation EFX" is that it's not a terrible album, but it's not an important one either, and it continues a sad trend of Das EFX albums becoming less meaningful with each release."

== Track listing ==
No.	Title	Writer(s)	Producer(s)	Length
1.	"Intro"			0:31
2.	"Raw Breed"	Andre Weston; William Hines; Chris Charity; Derek Lynch; Angel Aguilar	Solid Scheme; 8-Off	3:02
3.	"Shine"	Weston; Hines; T. Williams; Mark Adams; Steve Arrington; Mark Hicks; Ray Turner; Danny Webster	Tony L.	4:04
4.	"Somebody Told Me" (featuring 8-Off and Nocturnal)	Weston; Hines; Aguilar; Yasin Muhammedi	8-Off	3:38
5.	"Set It Off"	Weston; Hines	Rashad Smith; Armando Colon (co.)	4:17
6.	"No Doubt" (featuring M.O.P. and Teflon)	Weston; Hines; Eric Murray; Jamal Grinnage; Linwood Starling; Charity; Lynch	Solid Scheme	3:41
7.	"Rap Scholar" (featuring Redman)	Weston; Hines; Reginald Noble; Parrish Smith; Raymond Ransom; Reggie Hargis; Edward Irons	Rashad Smith; Armando Colon (co.); PMD (co.)	3:21
8.	"Generation EFX" (featuring EPMD)	Weston; Hines; Smith; Erick Sermon; Aguilar; Frank Sullivan	PMD; 8-Off (co.)	3:46
9.	"Rite Now"	Weston; Hines; Michael Lowe; Albert Johnson; Kejuan Muchita	Mike Lowe	2:58
10.	"Whut Goes Around" (featuring Miss Jones)	Weston; Hines; Tarsha Jones; Smith	PMD	3:34
11.	"Make Noize"	Weston; Hines; Charity; Lynch	Solid Scheme	3:10
12.	"New Stuff"	Weston; Hines; Smith; Aguilar; Charlie Marotta	PMD; 8-Off (co.); Charlie Marotta (co.)	3:28
13.	"Take It Back" (featuring PMD)	Weston; Hines; Smith	PMD	2:18
14.	"Change"	Weston; Hines; Aguilar; Brian May	8-Off	4:35
15.	"Rap Scholar (Original Version)" (featuring Redman)	Weston; Hines; Noble; Smith; Ransom; Hargis; Irons	PMD	3:59
Total length:				50:22

== Personnel ==
- Andre "Krazy Drayz" Weston – main artist
- Willie "Skoob" Hines – main artist
- Angel "8-Off Agallah" Aguilar – featured artist (track 4), producer (tracks: 2, 4, 14), co-producer (tracks: 8, 12)
- Yasin "Nocturnal" Muhammedi – featured artist (track 4)
- Eric "Billy Danze" Murray – featured artist (track 6)
- Jamal "Lil' Fame" Grinnage – featured artist (track 6)
- Linwood "Teflon" Starling – featured artist (track 6)
- Reginald "Redman" Noble – featured artist (tracks: 7, 15)
- Parrish "PMD" Smith – featured artist (track 8), producer (tracks: 8, 10, 12, 13, 15), co-producer (track 7), executive producer
- Erick Sermon – featured artist (track 8)
- Tarsha "Miss" Jones – featured artist (track 10)
- Chris Charity – producer (tracks: 2, 6, 11)
- Derek Lynch – producer (tracks: 2, 6, 11)
- Tony L. Williams – producer (track 3)
- Rashad Smith – producer (tracks: 5, 7)
- Michael "Mike Loe" Lowe – producer (track 9)
- Armando Colon – co-producer (tracks: 5, 7)
- Charlie Marotta – co-producer (track 12), engineering, mixing
- Eliud "Lou" Ortiz – engineering, mixing
- Tom Ciante – engineering
- John Decatur – engineering
- Bob Fudjinski – engineering
- Dave Greenberg – engineering
- Paul Gregory – engineering
- Ivan "Doc" Rodriguez – mixing
- Greg Burke – art direction, design
- Danny Clinch – photography
- Agnes Cammock – styling

== Charts ==
Chart (1998)	Peak position
US Billboard 200	48
US Top R&B/Hip-Hop Albums (Billboard)	10
