= KRS-One (album) =

KRS One

Studio album by KRS-One
- Released: October 10, 1995
- Recorded: March–July 1995
- Studio: Boogie Down Productions (New York City); D&D (New York City)
- Genre: East Coast hip-hop; boom bap; hardcore hip-hop
- Length: 1:05:49
- Label: Jive
- Producer: Big French Productions; Diamond D; DJ Premier; KRS-One; Norty Cotto; Showbiz

KRS-One chronology
Return of the Boom Bap (1993)	KRS One (1995)	The Battle for Rap Supremacy (1996)

Singles from KRS One
- 1. "MC's Act Like They Don't Know" Released: August 28, 1995; 2. "Rappaz R. N. Dainja" Released: November 29, 1995

Professional ratings
Review scores
Source	Rating
AllMusic	4/5 stars
Robert Christgau	(dud)
Muzik	5/5 stars
Rolling Stone	3/5 stars
The New Rolling Stone Album Guide	4/5 stars
The Source	4/5 stars
The Sydney Morning Herald	3/5 stars

KRS One is the second solo studio album by American rapper KRS-One. It was released on October 10, 1995, via Jive Records. The album was produced by DJ Premier, Diamond D, Big French Productions, Norty Cotto, Showbiz, and KRS-One. It features guest appearances from Busta Rhymes, Channel Live, Das EFX, Dexter Thibou, Fat Joe, and Mad Lion.

The album made it to number 19 on the Billboard 200 and number 2 on the Top R&B/Hip-Hop Albums in the United States. It also debuted at number 95 on the UK Albums Chart and number 13 on the UK R&B Albums Chart. Its lead single, "MC's Act Like They Don't Know", peaked at No. 57 on the US Billboard Hot 100 and No. 84 on the UK Singles Chart. The second single, "Rappaz R. N. Dainja", peaked at No. 47 in the UK.

== Track listing ==
No.	Title	Producer(s)	Length
1.	"Rappaz R. N. Dainja"	DJ Premier	5:58
2.	"De Automatic" (featuring Fat Joe)	Big French Productions	4:25
3.	"MC's Act Like They Don't Know"	DJ Premier	4:55
4.	"Ah-Yeah"	KRS-One	3:50
5.	"R.E.A.L.I.T.Y." (featuring Dexter Thibou)	Norty Cotto	4:17
6.	"Free Mumia" (featuring Channel Live)	KRS-One	4:08
7.	"Hold"	KRS-One	5:55
8.	"Wannabemceez" (featuring Mad Lion)	DJ Premier	4:21
9.	"Represent the Real Hip Hop" (featuring Das EFX)	Showbiz	4:38
10.	"The Truth"	KRS-One	3:46
11.	"Build Ya Skillz" (featuring Busta Rhymes)	Diamond D	4:41
12.	"Out for Fame"	KRS-One	4:51
13.	"Squash All Beef"	Diamond D	5:04
14.	"Health, Wealth, Self"	KRS-One	5:00
Total length:			1:05:49

Sample credits

- Track 1 contains a sample from "Time's Up" written by Omar Credle and Anthony Best as recorded by O.C.
- Track 8 contains excerpts from "Pure" written by Ansar Bing, Askia Bing, Dwayne Burns, Keenan Edwards, Sean Nelson and Steven Samuel and performed by the Troubleneck Brothers
- Track 9 contains a sample from "We Run Things (It's Like Dat)" written by Acklins Khaliyl Dillon, Harold Lee, Jamahl Hanna and Ali Shaheed Muhammad as recorded by Da Bush Babees
- Track 13 contains a sample from "Mystique Blues" written by Wayne Henderson as recorded by the Crusaders

== Personnel ==
- Lawrence "KRS-One" Parker – main artist, producer (tracks: 4, 6, 7, 10, 12, 14), engineering (tracks: 7, 10, 14), mixing (tracks: 2, 4–7, 10, 12, 14)
- Joseph "Fat Joe" Cartagena – featured artist (track 2)
- Dexter Thibou – featured artist (track 5)
- Vincent "Tuffy" Morgan – featured artist (track 6)
- Hakim Green – featured artist (track 6)
- Oswald "Mad Lion" Priest – featured artist (track 8)
- Andre "Krazy Drayz" Weston – featured artist (track 9)
- Willie "Skoob" Hines – featured artist (track 9)
- Trevor "Busta Rhymes" Smith – featured artist (track 11)
- Richard "Rich Nice" Jackson – backing vocals (track 10)
- Derek "Sadat X" Murphy – backing vocals (track 13)
- Rodney "DJ Dice" Battle – scratches (track 9)
- Chris "DJ Premier" Martin – producer (tracks: 1, 3, 8), mixing (tracks: 1, 8)
- Frenchie "Big French" Hunt – producer (track 2)
- Norberto "Norty" Cotto – producer & mixing (track 5), engineering (tracks: 2, 3, 5, 12)
- Rodney "Showbiz" LeMay – producer (track 9)
- Joseph "Diamond D" Kirkland – producer & mixing (tracks: 11, 13)
- "Commissioner" Gordon Williams – mixing (track 6), engineering (tracks: 6, 9, 11, 13), editing (tracks: 4, 10)
- Eddie Sancho – engineering (tracks: 1, 8)
- Won Allen – engineering (track 4)
- Luis Tineo – engineering assistant (tracks: 1, 3, 5, 8, 12)
- Roderick Goode – engineering assistant (tracks: 7, 10)
- Tom Brick – mastering
- Miguel Rivera – design
- Daniel Hastings – photography
- Scott "DJ Scott La Rock" Sterling – overseen by

== Charts ==
=== Weekly charts ===
Chart (1995)	Peak position
UK Albums (OCC)	95
UK R&B Albums (OCC)	13
US Billboard 200	19
US Top R&B/Hip-Hop Albums (Billboard)	2

=== Year-end charts ===
Chart (1995)	Position
US Top R&B/Hip-Hop Albums (Billboard)	99

=== Singles ===
Year	Song	Chart positions				
Year	Song	US	US HH/R&B	US Rap	US Dance Singles Sales	UK
1995	"MC's Act Like They Don't Know"	57	35	9	1	84
1995	"Rappaz R. N. Dainja"	—	—	—	—	47
