= Dead Serious (album) =

Studio album by Das EFX
- Released: April 7, 1992
- Recorded: February 1991 – January 1992
- Studio: Firehouse (Brooklyn, New York); North Shore Soundworks (Long Island, New York)
- Genre: Hip hop
- Length: 38:43
- Label: East West
- Producer: Solid Scheme, Das EFX, Dexx

Das EFX chronology
Dead Serious (1992)	Straight Up Sewaside (1993)

Singles from Dead Serious
- 1. "They Want EFX" Released: January 28, 1992; 2. "Mic Checka" Released: July 16, 1992; 3. "Straight Out the Sewer" Released: November 19, 1992

Dead Serious is the debut studio album of American hip hop duo Das EFX, released on April 7, 1992, on compact disc and audio cassette on East West Records and distributed through Atlantic Records. The recording sessions took place at Firehouse Studios in Brooklyn, New York, and at Charlie Marotta's North Shore Soundworks studio in Long Island, New York.

The album peaked at 16 on the U.S. Billboard 200 chart, topping the Top R&B/Hip-Hop Albums chart for five weeks and reaching platinum sales by 1993. Well-received upon its release, Dead Serious has since been regarded by music writers as a significant and influential album in hip hop. It was also nominated in the 1993 Soul Train Music Awards and 1993 Billboard Music Awards.

== Background ==
Group member William "Skoob" Hines was raised in the neighborhood of Crown Heights, Brooklyn. Andre "Krazy Drayz" Weston, born in Kingston, Jamaica, came to the United States as a child, growing up in Union City and Teaneck, New Jersey. Both rapped during their high school years, Hines with the group's future producer Derek Lynch's brother Tony. However, Lynch was Hines' DJ first and would not begin producing until later. Hines and Weston began performing together after they met at Virginia State University in 1988. Hines and Weston met their freshman year on a road trip to another college through a mutual friend. According to Weston, the two became a duo after winning a campus contest which Hines suggested they enter together. Hines and Weston began to work with Brooklyn-based producers Chris Charity and Derek Lynch, both friends of Hines' from high school, who had formed a production team using the name Solid Scheme Music at the time. According to Hines, aside from "Klap Ya Handz" and "They Want EFX," which was produced by Weston and he, all of the other instrumental tracks on the album were produced by Charity and Lynch. Around this time the group came up with its name which Weston noted was mostly Hines' idea. The name stemmed from an acronym of the two's nicknames, Skoob and Dray, and EFX from their constantly wanting their producers to add reverb to their vocals when in the studio. "So it was Sad EFX for a minute, but that didn't really make much sense, so we changed it to Das EFX."

Hines recalled much of the group's early material as being "primitive," stating that "the production on our early stuff didn't come up to par until "Klap Ya Handz." A producer named Dexx, also from Crown Heights, produced "Klap Ya Handz" for the group. In early 1991, Hines and Weston heard that EPMD would be hosting a talent show at Club Tropicana in Richmond, Virginia and decided to enter. Hines and Weston performed their song "Klap Ya Handz," which they'd recorded as a demo with Dexx (In fact, for the album, Hines and Weston had to rhyme over the demo for "Klap Ya Handz" because they didn't have an instrumental version of the music.). The group apparently had the highest score in the contest, which would earn the winner a $100 prize. However, according to Weston, although the duo had the highest score Parrish Smith, one half of the group EPMD, told the club announcer to give the second best group the prize. While the winning group went up to claim their prize, Smith came to Hines and Weston and said, "yo, what would you guys rather have: a record deal or a hundred dollars? Meet me in the back of the club in five minutes." Smith and Erick Sermon, the other member of EPMD, met with Hines and Weston in the back of the club and asked the two to play them the "Klap Ya Handz" track again. Sermon and Smith were so impressed by the song that they asked Hines and Weston for the tape, with Smith telling them, "if you can get us nine more songs like the one you just performed, we can get you a deal." Hines and Weston kept in touch with EPMD during their junior year in college, finishing out the school year in May.

In 1991, the group was signed to EPMD's GMC Productions production and management company and became a part of their Hit Squad collective of protégés. The material for their first album was recorded at Firehouse Studios in Brooklyn and EPMD's production home base, Charlie Marotta's North Shore Soundworks studio in Long Island. The duo would send EPMD, who were touring the country at the time, the material they were recording for guidance. The group, who were also courted by Jive Records at the time, were finally signed in late 1991 to the Atlantic Records subsidiary East West Records.

== Music ==
Due to being removed from an active music scene, the two MC's were free to develop their most idiosyncratic tendencies musically. According to Weston, the group's lyrical style stemmed from the two not being able to listen to New York hip hop on the radio in Virginia. Weston stated that "except for Brand Nubian, we weren't influenced by what was going on in New York. Basically we wanted to be different and we wanted to be dope like Brand Nubian... So instead of saying, 'I got a lot of balls,' we'd say, 'I got more nuts than a Baby Ruth.'" Hines also felt being away from the environment helped their personal artistic growth. "We just wasn't exposed to that many styles at the time, so it helped us form our own." Hines and Weston would make up gibberish words, adding -iggity after many of them, which would eventually become their signature. The group also had a tendency to weave many pop culture references into their rhymes.

Though many have assumed that EPMD produced the music on the album because of their executive production credit, Weston stated "in the studio back then it was just me, Skoob, Chris, and Derek, and that was it. EPMD didn't produce us, we were just with their production company. A lot of people forget that." Weston referred to Charity, who died in the year 2000, as "the brains of the operation, definitely... He was definitely the boss and the real executive producer of the first album. We'd have meetings at his crib in Brooklyn and he was running things."

== Critical reception ==
Professional ratings
Review scores
Source	Rating
AllMusic	5/5 stars
Robert Christgau	(1-star Honorable Mention)
RapReviews	9/10
The Source	4/5 stars

Dead Serious caused an immediate sensation upon its release in March 1992. The album went platinum on the strength of the singles "Mic Checka" and the Top 40 pop hit "They Want EFX", by 1993. Giving it a 4 out of 5-mic rating, The Source's Matty C compared the duo's lyrical style to that of Busta Rhymes, Treach, and EPMD, writing "Not only have they innovated a new rhyme flow that expands on all these styles, but they have brought back fun filled hip-hop". Ronin Ro of Spin complimented their "hard lyrics that simultaneously perplex, captivate, annoy, and amuse... television-induced, schizophrenic, lyrical wit". In his consumer guide for The Village Voice, critic Robert Christgau gave the album an honorable mention rating, indicating "a worthy effort consumers attuned to its overriding aesthetic or individual vision may well like".

In a retrospective review, RapReviews writer Steve Juon described the album as "ten tracks jam-packed with dopeness" and commended Das EFX for "merging pop culture and punchlines, beat poet skat and hip-hop style, and creating a free form lyrical jazz in the process". Ira Robbins of Trouser Press called it "a monstrously entertaining debut" and wrote that they "don't push the topical envelope any — geography, rhyming and sexing are pretty much the alpha-omega of their menu... Fortunately, the pair's rereading of old news yields fresh and funny angles". AllMusic's Stanton Swihart noted the duo's "lightning-fast, tongue-twisted word association and stream-of-consciousness rants rich in pop cultural references and allusions". Stewart elaborated on its initial appeal and subsequent influence in hip hop, stating:

[T]he album wasn't just appealing; it was also enormously influential, ushering in an entirely unique rhyming flow that influenced any number of rappers, established and novice alike... their lyrics are about as far removed from hardcore realism as they could possibly be, and although there are certain elements of boasting, it is so cut up and contorted that it never sounds like there's even a hint of the humdrum here... It was a completely original rhyming style in 1992 — one of the reasons it had such an impact both in the insular world of hip-hop and on the wider public — but it also had an invigorating looseness that lent itself to commercial radio.

— Stanton Stewart

Speaking on the duo's impact, Hines stated that he felt "what we were doing brought a twist to the game without watering anything down. If you were only hearing our radio stuff, you had one impression of us, but if you got the album then you realized there was a lot more depth there".

== Track listing ==
All tracks produced by Solid Scheme, except where noted.

No.	Title	Writer(s)	Length
1.	"Mic Checka"		4:54
2.	"Jussummen"		3:29
3.	"They Want EFX" (Produced by Das EFX)	Charles Bobbit, James Brown, Fred Wesley, Andre Weston, William Hines	3:39
4.	"Looseys"		2:50
5.	"Dum Dums"		3:50
6.	"East Coast"		4:29
7.	"If Only"		4:02
8.	"Brooklyn to T-Neck"		4:01
9.	"Klap Ya Handz" (Produced by Dexx)		4:07
10.	"Straight Out the Sewer"		3:22

== Personnel ==
Information taken from album booklet liner notes.

- Art director: Bob Defrin
- Design: Larry Freemantle
- Engineering: Charlie Marotta, Bobby Sarsur, Yorum Vazan
- Executive producers: EPMD
- Guitar: Bobby Sichran
- Mixing: Charlie Marotta, Bobby Sarsur
- Photography: Robert Manella
- Production: Chris Charity, William Hines, Derek Lynch, Andre Weston, Dexter James
- Scratching: DJ Rhythm

== Charts ==
=== Weekly charts ===
Chart (1992)	Peak position
US Billboard 200	16
US Top R&B/Hip-Hop Albums (Billboard)	1

=== Year-end charts ===
Chart (1992)	Position
US Billboard 200	78
US Top R&B/Hip-Hop Albums (Billboard)	16

== Certifications ==
Region	Certification	Certified units/sales
United States (RIAA)	Platinum	1,000,000^{^}
^{^} Shipments figures based on certification alone.

== See also ==
- List of number-one R&B albums of 1992 (U.S.)
