= They Want EFX =

1992 single by Das EFX

Single by Das EFX

from the album Dead Serious
- B-side: "Jussumen"
- Released: January 28, 1992
- Recorded: 1991
- Genre: Hip hop, East Coast hip hop
- Length: 3:39
- Label: East West/Atlantic
- Songwriters: W. Hines, A. Weston, C. Bobbit, James Brown, Fred Wesley
- Producer: Das EFX

Das EFX singles chronology
"They Want EFX" (1992)	"Mic Checka" (1992)

"They Want EFX" is a song by American hip hop group Das EFX recorded for their debut album Dead Serious (1992). The song was released as the group's debut single for the album in January 28, 1992. The song samples "Blind Man Can See It" by James Brown and "Breath Control II" by Boogie Down Productions.

== Track listings ==
=== 12", Vinyl ===
1. "They Want EFX" (Dead Serious) - 3:49
2. "They Want EFX" (Instrumental) - 3:39
3. "They Want EFX" (Remix) - 3:55
4. "They Want EFX" (Dub) - 3:55

=== Cassette, Maxi-Single ===
1. "They Want EFX" (Remix) - 3:49
2. "They Want EFX" (Dead Serious) - 3:39
3. "Jussumen" (LP Version) - 3:29
4. "They Want EFX" (Dub) - 3:55
5. "They Want EFX" (Instrumental) - 3:55

=== CD, Promo ===
1. "They Want EFX" (Remix) - 3:49
2. "They Want EFX" (Dead Serious) - 3:39

== Personnel ==
Information taken from Discogs.

- arranging: Das EFX (W. Hines, A. Weston)
- co-production: Kevin Byrdsong, Marcus Logan
- engineering: Bobby Sarsur, Solid Scheme (C. Charity, D. Lynch)
- executive production: EPMD
- guitar: Bobby Sitchran
- mastering: Tony Dawsey
- mixing: Bobby Sarsur
- production: Das EFX
- remixing: Solid Scheme
- writing: Das EFX, C. Bobbit, J. Brown, F. Wesley

== Charts ==
=== Weekly charts ===
Chart (1992)	Peak position
US Billboard Hot 100	25
US Dance Club Songs (Billboard)	29
US Hot R&B/Hip-Hop Songs (Billboard)	5
US Hot Rap Songs (Billboard)	1

=== Year-end charts ===
Chart (1992)	Position
US Billboard Hot 100	99
US Hot R&B/Hip-Hop Songs (Billboard)	50
