= Desiya =

Music project

Desiya was a dance- and house-music project that was fronted by the DJ-remixer-producer Matthew Parkhouse from New York and featured Melissa Yiannakou (now De Sa) on vocals. Its 1992 #1 hit on the US Billboard Hot Dance Music/Club Play chart, "Comin' on Strong," was released by Mute/Elektra Records and featured remixes by Tony Humphries, Larry Heard, and Masters at Work. It peaked at #74 in the UK Singles Chart in February 1992.
