= Betcha'll Never Find =

Single by Chantay Savage

from the album Here We Go...
- Released: May 26, 1993
- Recorded: 1992–1993
- Genre: R&B
- Length: 4:01
- Label: RCA Records
- Songwriters: Steve "Silk" Hurley; Chantay Savage

Chantay Savage singles chronology
"Betcha'll Never Find" (1993)	"If You Believe" (1993)

"Betcha'll Never Find" is a song by American R&B/dance singer and songwriter Chantay Savage, released by RCA Records as her debut single from her first album, Here We Go... (1993). The song was written by her with Steve "Silk" Hurley, and was a top 20 hit on both the US Billboard R&B Singles and Dance Club Songs charts, peaking at number seventeen on both charts.

== Tracklisting ==
- Maxi-promo CD
1. "Betcha'll Never Find" (Radio Version) [3:48]
2. "Betcha'll Never Find" (Old Skool Version) [4:00]
3. "Betcha'll Never Find" (Dave Shaw Mix) [3:35]
4. "Betcha'll Never Find" (12" Extended Version) [5:44]
5. "Betcha'll Never Find" (Old Skool Extended Version) [5:12]

== Charts ==
=== Weekly charts ===
Chart (1993–1994)	Peak position
US Billboard Hot 100	70
US Dance Club Songs (Billboard)	17
US Hot R&B/Hip-Hop Songs (Billboard)	17
US Maxi-Singles Sales (Billboard)	19
US Rhythmic Airplay (Billboard)	35
US Cash Box Top 100	66

=== Year-end charts ===
Chart (1994)	Position
US Hot R&B/Hip-Hop Songs (Billboard)	86
