= Comin' On Strong (Desiya song) =

Single by Desiya featuring Melissa Yiannakou

from the album Paroxysm
- B-side: "Itch It Up"
- Released: November 1991
- Recorded: 1991
- Genre: House music
- Length: 4:08
- Label: Black Market International/Mute/Elektra
- Songwriter(s): Matthew Parkhouse; Larry Heard
- Producer(s): Larry Heard

"Comin' On Strong" is a Garage/Deep House song that was recorded and performed by the American duo Desiya, featuring lead singer Melissa Yiannakou, for their 1992 album "Paroxysm." The single was also the act's only release, reaching number one on Billboard's Dance Club Songs chart during the week of March 14, 1992. It also peaked at #74 in the UK Singles Chart in February 1992.

Originally released on the London-based Black Market Label in 1991, the single would eventually be picked up by Mute Records that same year followed by Elektra afterwards for North America.

== Background ==
The single, which was written by Desiya member Matthew Parkhouse and Larry Heard, featured a who's who of notable artists from the Dance community that were involved in the song's production and remixes, with Tony Humphries handling mixing duties, and Little Louie Vega, Kenny Dope Gonzalez, Todd Terry, and Larry Rauson performing as background musicians. Most of the production was done in New York City at 321 Studios, with engineering done in Chicago at Seagrape Studios and in London at Worldwide Studios.

== Track listing ==
CD Maxi (US)

- 1. Comin' On Strong (Radio Edit) (4:08)
- 2. Comin' On Strong (Spagatini Mix) (8:01)
- 3. Comin' On Strong (Zanza Dub) (8:25)
- 4. Comin' On Strong (Night Mix) (8:22)
- 5. Comin' On Strong (Rave Mix) (5:40)
- 6. Comin' On Strong (After Dark Mix) (6:04)
- 7. Itch It Up (5:30)
