= Club Lonely =

Single by Lil Louis & the World

from the album Journey With The Lonely
- Released: 1992
- Recorded: 1992
- Genre: House
- Length: 8:00 (Album version)
- Label: Epic; FFRR
- Songwriter: Lil Louis
- Producer: Lil Louis

Lil Louis & the World singles chronology
"Nyce & Slo" (1990)	"Club Lonely" (1992)	"Saved My Life" (1992)

"Club Lonely" is a 1992 single by Lil Louis & the World, which was taken from their album "A Journey With The Lonely." The track was written, composed and produced by Lil Louis, featuring lead vocals by Joi Cardwell. The single is a radical departure from Lil Louis' other releases, as he used musicians to give it a Jazz-influenced House feel and to express the song's primary theme. The single was Lil Louis' second chart topper on the Billboard Hot Dance Club Play chart, reaching number one on June 20, 1992.

== Track listings ==
CD single (US)

- 1. Club Lonely (Club Radio Mix) 4:00
- 2. Club Lonely (Shaft's Radio Mix) 4:29
- 3. Club Lonely (I'm On The Guest List Mix) 6:58
- 4. Club Lonely (DJ Pierre's Afro Club Mix) 6:51
- 5. Club Lonely (Bellbottoms & Platforms Mix) 5:13
- 6. Club Lonely (Radically Lonely Mix) 4:29
- 7. Blackout (Remix '92) 6:04

12 inch promo (US)

- A1 Club Lonely (I'm On The Guest List Mix) 6:57
- A2 Club Lonely (DJ Pierre's Afro Club Mix) 6:46
- B1 Club Lonely (Radically Lonely Mix) 4:27
- B2 Club Lonely (Bellbottoms & Platforms Mix) 5:09
- B3 Club Lonely (Dance Radio Mix) 3:29
- B4 Club Lonely (Loneapella) 2:40

CD Maxi (UK/Europe)

- 1 Club Lonely (I'm On The Guest List) 6:58
- 2 Club Lonely (Dance Radio Mix) 3:30
- 3 Club Lonely (Alone & Horny Mix) 4:44
- 4 Club Lonely (Radically Lonely Mix) 4:29

Unofficial release

- A1 Club Lonely (The Guest List Mix)
- A2 Club Lonely (Not On The List Inst. Mix)
- B Birds & Trees (Remix)
