= Too Blind to See It (song) =

1991 single by Kym Sims

Single by Kym Sims

from the album Too Blind to See It
- Released: August 1991
- Genre: House; R&B
- Length: 3:32 (Hurley's "No Rap" House Mix)
- Label: ATCO; EastWest
- Songwriter: Steve "Silk" Hurley
- Producer: Steve "Silk" Hurley

Kym Sims singles chronology
"Too Blind to See It" (1991)	"Take My Advice" (1992)

Music video
- "Too Blind to See It" on YouTube

"Too Blind to See It" is a song by American singer Kym Sims, written and produced by Steve "Silk" Hurley. It was released in 1991 by ATCO and EastWest Records as the first single from her eponymous debut album (1992). It contains a sample of speaking ("Let me tell you something, ain't no man in the world") by Rochelle Fleming from the group First Choice, from the song "Let No Man Put Asunder" (Salsoul Records). "Too Blind to See It" peaked at number 38 on the US Billboard Hot 100 and number one on the Billboard Hot Dance Club Play chart. Internationally, it reached the top 10 in Denmark, Finland, and the United Kingdom. A music video was produced for the single's promotion.

== Background and release ==
In August 1991, the independent I.D. label first released the single in America. It was subsequently picked up by Atco Records and released in the UK. Sims was asked to demo the song more than a year before she recorded it commercially. In a 1991 interview, she says, "I guess they must have decided to give it to someone else, but they came back eventually."

== Lyrics ==
The lyrics are from the perspective of a woman ending her relationship with a cheating partner. She describes being in denial, but eventually admits her partner's infidelity. As intimated in the title and the refrain, she was "too blind to see it."

== Critical reception ==
Larry Flick from Billboard magazine stated in his review that producer/songwriter Steve "Silk" Hurley "once again reaffirms his position as Chicago's finest on this wriggling, R&B-inflected houser", noting that newcomer Sims "exudes the confidence and range of a seasoned pro, while remixer Maurice Joshua drops another of his deep underground workouts." Chris Heim from the Chicago Tribune named it "a slick, upbeat little dance tune". In 1995, Mark Roland from Melody Maker asked, "Which one of you can truly say that you didn't dance around your handbag in gay abandon to her faultless 1992 house hit, 'Too Blind to See It'?" In a retrospective review, Pop Rescue called the song "infectious", adding that "laden with those catchy italia-house pianos, and fast beats, her vocals cut through them perfectly as she sings about a love lost." Richard Riccio from the St. Petersburg Times wrote, "Best of all is the perfect balance she walks between dance floor drama and overdone diva kitsch, especially on the incredible stomp anthem, 'Too Blind to See It'."

== Chart performance ==
In the UK, "Too Blind to See It" peaked at number five on the UK Singles Chart on the week of January 11, 1992, its sixth week on the chart. It reached number one on both the Music Week Dance Singles chart and the UK Club Chart and was certified silver by the British Phonographic Industry. Due to its success in the UK, Sims performed it on the British music chart TV show Top of the Pops twice.

"Too Blind to See It" peaked at number six in Finland, number eight in Denmark, number eleven in Luxembourg, and number 14 in Belgium. On the Eurochart Hot 100, it reached number 22 in its fifth week on the chart in February 1992. The song topped the charts in Zimbabwe, peaked at number five on the Billboard Hot Dance Club Play chart in the US, and at numbers thirteen and sixteen in Israel and Australia.

== Track listings ==
- 7-inch, Germany
1. "Too Blind to See It" (Hurley's "No Rap" House Mix) – 3:59
2. "Too Blind to See It" (Hurley's House Mix) – 5:00
- 12-inch single, US
1. "Too Blind to See It" (Original Mix) – 3:46
2. "Too Blind to See It" (Maurice's Super Dub Mix) – 7:06
3. "Too Blind to See It" (Hurley's House Mix) – 4:57
4. "Too Blind to See It" (Hurley's Dub Mix) – 6:42
- 12-inch single, UK
1. "Too Blind to See It" (Hurley's House Mix) – 5:00
2. "Too Blind to See It" (Slam Atlantis Mix) – 6:15
3. "Too Blind to See It" (Original Soul Mix) – 3:52
4. "Too Blind to See It" (Hurley's House Dub) – 6:26
5. "Too Blind to See It" (Slam Dub Mix) – 6:15
- CD single, UK and Europe
1. "Too Blind to See It" (Hurley's "No Rap" House Mix) – 3:32
2. "Too Blind to See It" (Hurley's House Mix) – 5:04
3. "Too Blind to See It" (Original Soul Mix) – 3:53
4. "Too Blind to See It" (Hurley's House Dub) – 6:25

== Charts ==
=== Weekly charts ===
Chart (1991–1992)	Peak position
Australia (ARIA)	161
Belgium (Ultratop 50 Flanders)	14
Denmark (IFPI)	8
Europe (Eurochart Hot 100)	22
Europe (European Dance Radio)	2
Finland (Suomen virallinen lista)	6
Ireland (IRMA)	20
Israel (Israeli Singles Chart)	13
Luxembourg (Radio Luxembourg)	11
Netherlands (Dutch Top 40)	28
Netherlands (Single Top 100)	28
New Zealand (Recorded Music NZ)	45
Sweden (Sverigetopplistan)	21
UK Singles (Official Charts)	5
UK Airplay (Music Week)	3
UK Dance (Music Week)	1
UK Club Chart (Record Mirror)	1
US Billboard Hot 100	38
US Dance Club Songs (Billboard)	5
US Dance Singles Sales (Billboard)	1
US Cash Box Top 100	73
Zimbabwe (ZIMA)	1

=== Year-end charts ===
Chart (1991)	Position
UK Singles (OCC)	76
UK Club Chart (Record Mirror)	19

Chart (1992)	Position
UK Singles (OCC)	90
US Maxi-Singles Sales (Billboard)	29

== Release history ==
Region	Date	Format(s)	Label(s)	Ref.
United States	1991	12-inch vinyl; cassette	ATCO	
United Kingdom	November 25, 1991	7-inch vinyl; 12-inch vinyl; CD; cassette	ATCO; EastWest	
Australia	March 16, 1992	CD	ATCO; EastWest	
