= It's a Summer Thang =

Single by M-Doc featuring Chantay Savage

from the album M. Doc Wit Stevio: C'mon Getcha Groove On
- Released: August 30, 1994
- Genre: R&B, hip hop
- Length: 4:25
- Label: RCA Records
- Songwriters: Tonia Hurley, Jeremiah McAllister, Chantay Savage, Marc Williams

M-Doc singles chronology
"Whatever U Need" (1992)	"It's a Summer Thang" (1994)	"Like 'Em Like That (Guess I'm Just A Freak)" (1995)

Music video
- "It's a Summer Thang" on YouTube

"It's a Summer Thang" is the title of a rap/R&B single by M-Doc featuring Chantay Savage, and Stevio from the 1995 album M. Doc Wit Stevio: C'mon Getcha Groove On. It was the first single from his album of the same title. Billboard called it "a radio friendly ditty, complemented by Savage's sassy vocalizing".

The music video was filmed in Chicago, Illinois in 1994.

== Chart positions ==
Chart (1994)	Peak position
U.S. Billboard Hot R&B Singles	101
