= Chantay Savage =

American contemporary R&B singer

- Born: July 16, 1971 (age 55); Chicago, Illinois, U.S.
- Genres: R&B, pop, dance, house
- Years active: 1992–present
- Label: RCA

Chantay Savage is an American R&B/dance singer. She experienced some success in the 1990s on various Billboard singles charts, one of which was "I Will Survive", a reworking of the Gloria Gaynor hit song.

Savage has scored various charting hits on other US charts such as the Billboard Hot 100, Dance chart and R&B chart. In total, Savage has spent 452 weeks on various Billboard singles charts, and her albums have spent a total of 81 weeks on various Billboard charts.

== Biography ==
Before Savage signed a recording contract, she parlayed success into gigs as a session musician, singer, and songwriter with artists such as CeCe Peniston and Tanya Blount. Savage co-wrote Peniston's hit single "We Got a Love Thang". In 1993, Savage released her first single "If You Believe" from her debut album Here We Go.... Her follow-up "Betcha'll Never Find" became a top 20 dance and R&B hit on the Billboard chart. She also released the singles "Don't Let It Go to Your Head" and "Give It to Ya".

In 1995, she teamed up with Aaliyah, En Vogue, TLC, BlackGirl, Mary J. Blige, Vanessa Williams, SWV, and others for the single "Freedom" from the movie Panther.

Savage released "I Will Survive" in 1996, from her second album I Will Survive (Doin' It My Way). The single became a moderate hit in the US, peaking at #24 on the pop charts, and #5 on Billboard's R&B chart. It reached #12 in the UK Singles Chart. The single was also certified gold by the RIAA for US single sales of over 500,000 units. In 1997 she, along with Deborah Cox, Heavy D, and Brownstone performed Janet Jackson's number 1 single "That's the Way Love Goes" at the Soul Train Music Awards tribute to the popular icon. In 1998, Savage scored another minor hit with "Reminding Me (Of Sef)", performed by Common. It was a top 10 hit for Common on Billboard′s Hot Rap chart.

In 1999, she released her third album This Time, its first single "Come Around" which peaked at number 62. Savage wrote all the lyrics and played piano and drums. In 2003, she collaborated with spoken word artist Malik Yusef on the song "Auto-Eroticism" on his album The Great Chicago Fire: A Cold Day In Hell. Three years later, she appeared on a remake of the Earth Wind & Fire hit "September" for Full Flava's Music Is Our Way of Life album. Also that year, she recorded the theme song for BellaNutri titled "Always Beautiful" as well as an additional track "Shine", which was released on a CD for the company.

In 2012, she collaborated with another spoken-word artist, Quill, on his track "Everything Must Change."

== Discography ==
=== Albums ===
==== Studio albums ====
Year	Album	Chart positions			Sales
Year	Album	U.S.	R&B	Heatseekers	Sales
1993	Here We Go...	-	89	-	
1996	I Will Survive (Doin' It My Way)	106	14	2	127,000
1999	This Time	-	56	-	

=== Singles ===
Year	Single	Peak positions				
Year	Single	Billboard Hot 100	Hot R&B/Hip-Hop Singles & Tracks	Hot Dance Music/Maxi-Singles Sales	Hot Dance Club Songs	UK Singles Chart
1992	"I Gotta Hold On U" (Maurice Joshua featuring Chantay Savage)	-	-	-	-	-
1992	"Let's Get Intimate" (Body 2 Body with Donell Rush & Chantay Savage)	-	-	-	-	-
1993	"Betcha'll Never Find"	70	17	28	17	-
1993	"If You Believe"	-	75	42	-	83
1994	"Don't Let It Go to Your Head"	-	80	28	14	-
1994	"Freedom"	45	18	-	-	-
1994	"Give It to Ya"	-	80	-	-	-
1994	"It's a Summer Thang" (M-Doc featuring Chantay Savage)	-	-	-	-	-
1996	"I Will Survive"	24	5	10	35	12
1996	"Baby: Drive Me Crazy"	-	-	-	-	-
1997	"Reminding Me (Of Sef)" (Common featuring Chantay Savage)	-	57	-	-	59
1999	"Come Around"	-	62	-	-	-
1999	"My Oh My"	-	-	-	-	-
2020	Tear It Down (featuring Shawnna)	-	-	-	-	-
"—" denotes a release that did not chart.

=== Soundtracks ===
- 1996: The Associate (on "Yes We Can Can" with Taral Hicks, LaShanda Reese and The Pointer Sisters)
- 2006: Bella Nutri (EP) (on "Always Beautiful" and "Shine")

=== Other appearances ===
- 2003: "Auto-Eroticism" (with Malik Yusef) (from The Great Chicago Fire: A Cold Day In Hell)
- 2006: "September" (with Full Flava) (from Music Is Our Way of Life)
- 2012: "Everything Must Change" (with Quill)
