= Straight Up Sewaside =

Studio album by Das EFX
- Released: November 16, 1993
- Recorded: September 1992 – May 1993
- Studio: Northshore Soundworks (Commack, NY)
- Genre: East Coast hip hop, hardcore hip hop
- Length: 43:55
- Label: EastWest
- Producer: PMD (exec.); Charlie Marotta; Solid Scheme

Das EFX chronology
Dead Serious (1992)	Straight Up Sewaside (1993)	Hold It Down (1995)

Singles from Straight Up Sewaside
- 1. "Freakit" Released: October 21, 1993; 2. "Baknaffek" Released: March 3, 1994

Professional ratings
Review scores
Source	Rating
AllMusic	4/5 stars
RapReviews	7.5/10

Straight Up Sewaside is the second studio album by American hip hop duo Das EFX. It was released on November 16, 1993 via East West Records. Recording sessions took place at Northshore Soundworks in Commack, New York. Production was handled by Solid Scheme and Charlie Marotta, with PMD serving as executive producer. The album debuted at number 20 on the Billboard 200 and number 6 on the Top R&B/Hip-Hop Albums in the United States. It was supported with two singles, "Freakit" and "Baknaffek". Its lead single, "Freakit", was released on October 21, 1993 and made it to number 43 on the Billboard Hot 100.

== Critical reception ==
Spin wrote that "on Straight Up Sewaside, the fidgeting raps keep coming, with pumping, vinyl-hissing production, and that was enough. In this case, more of the same was impressive and even admirable". Ira Robbins of Trouser Press wrote: "the sophomore album is a let-down, with dull production, streamlined vocals and too many go-nowhere stragglers".

== Track listing ==
No.	Title	Writer(s)	Producer(s)	Length
1.	"Intro"			0:37
2.	"Undaground Rappa"	Andre Weston; William Hines; Chris Charity; Derek Lynch; James Brown	Solid Scheme	4:01
3.	"Gimme Dat Micraphone"	Weston; Hines; Charles Marotta; Kool & the Gang	Charlie Marotta	3:16
4.	"Check It Out"	Weston; Hines; Charity; Lynch	Solid Scheme	3:55
5.	"Interlude"	Weston; Hines; Charity; Lynch	Solid Scheme	0:30
6.	"Freakit"	Weston; Hines; Charity; Lynch	Solid Scheme	3:18
7.	"Rappaz"	Weston; Hines; Charity; Lynch	Solid Scheme	4:22
8.	"Interview"			1:29
9.	"Baknaffek"	Weston; Hines; Charity; Lynch; Larry Graham; Freddie Stone	Solid Scheme	3:32
10.	"Kaught in da Ak"	Weston; Hines; Charity; Lynch; Rick Rubin; Adam Horovitz; Joseph Simmons; Darryl McDaniels	Solid Scheme	4:51
11.	"Wontu"	Weston; Hines; Charity; Lynch	Solid Scheme	2:55
12.	"Krazy Wit da Books"	Weston; Hines; Charity; Lynch; Burt Bacharach; Hal David	Solid Scheme	3:57
13.	"It'z Lik Dat"	Weston; Hines; Charity; Lynch	Solid Scheme	3:31
14.	"Host Wit da Most" (Rappaz Remix)	Weston; Hines; Charity; Lynch		3:32
Total length:				43:55

Sample credits

- Track 2 contains a sample from "Soul Power" by James Brown.
- Track 3 contains a sample of "Funky Granny" by Kool & the Gang.
- Track 9 contains samples from the Graham Central Station recording "People".
- Track 10 contains excerpts from the composition "Paul Revere" by the Beastie Boys.
- Track 12 contains a sample of "Walk On By" by Gloria Gaynor.

Notes

- The booklet lists a songwriting credit for 'J. Brown' on the 7th track, but this may be a misprint. ASCAP and BMI lists only the two performers and two producers and there is no James Brown sample on this track.

== Personnel ==
- Andre "Krazy Drayz" Weston – vocals, re-mixing (track 14)
- Willie "Skoob" Hines – vocals, re-mixing (track 14)
- Chris Charity – scratches, producer & arranger (tracks: 2, 4-7, 9-13), recording, engineering, mixing
- Derek Lynch – scratches, producer & arranger (tracks: 2, 4-7, 9-13), recording, engineering, mixing
- Rodney "DJ Dice" Battle – scratches
- Charlie Marotta – producer & arranger (track 3), recording, engineering, mixing
- Tony Dawsey – mastering
- Parrish "PMD" Smith – executive producer
- Amy Guip – photography

== Charts ==
=== Weekly charts ===
Chart (1993)	Peak position
US Billboard 200	20
US Top R&B/Hip-Hop Albums (Billboard)	6

=== Year-end charts ===
Chart (1994)	Position
US Top R&B/Hip-Hop Albums (Billboard)	52
