= How We Do (album) =

Studio album by Das EFX
- Released: September 23, 2003
- Recorded: 2003
- Genre: Hip hop
- Length: 47:18
- Label: UTR Music
- Producers: Dame Grease; Das EFX; DJ Rondevu; DR Period; Gerrard C. Baker; King James II; Koolade; Kuntry Man; Nastee; Sully Sefil

Das EFX chronology
Generation EFX (1998)	How We Do (2003)	Old School Throwback (2015)

Singles from How We Do
- 1. "East Coast Husslaz" Released: September 17, 2002; 2. "How We Do" Released: 2003

Professional ratings
Review scores
Source	Rating
AllMusic	2.5/5 stars
HipHopDX	2.5/5

How We Do is the fifth studio album by American hip hop duo Das EFX. It was released in 2003 via UTR Music. Production was handled by Koolade, Sully Sefil, Dame Grease, DJ Rondevu, DR Period, Gerrard C. Baker, King James II, Kuntry Man, Nastee and Das EFX themselves. It features guest appearances from JJ, Lovey, Sean Paul and Un Pacino.

Unlike the group's four previous albums, there was no production input from EPMD.

== Track listing ==
No.	Title	Producer(s)	Length
1.	"Intro"		0:49
2.	"Greezy"	Dame Grease	3:57
3.	"Full Tyme Hussle"	Nastee	4:12
4.	"Dro & Henne" (featuring JJ)	Skoob	4:01
5.	"The Memories Remain" (featuring Sean Paul)	Gerrard C. Baker	3:32
6.	"Diggy DAS"	King James II	4:15
7.	"G Music"	Das EFX; DR Period	4:07
8.	"Get It Poppin'"	Skoob; Kuntry Man	3:33
9.	"Jungle" (featuring Lovey)	Skoob; Sully Sefil	4:25
10.	"How We Do"	Das EFX; DJ Rondevu	4:00
11.	"East Coast Husslaz" (featuring JJ and Un Pacino)	Skoob; Sully Sefil	3:28
12.	"Let's Get Money"	Krazy Drayz; Koolade	3:26
13.	"B.S.A.P." (featuring Lovey)	Krazy Drayz; Koolade	3:33
Total length:			47:18
