= Saved My Life (Lil Louis & the World song) =

Single by Lil Louis & the World

from the album Journey With The Lonely
- Released: 1992
- Recorded: 1992
- Genre: House
- Length: 4:25 (Album version)
- Label: Epic; FFRR
- Songwriter(s): Lil Louis
- Producer(s): Lil Louis; Anthony Wonsey

Lil Louis & the World singles chronology
"Club Lonely" (1992)	"Saved My Life" (1992)	"Clap Your Hands" (1997)

"Saved My Life" is a 1992 single by Lil Louis & the World, which was taken from their album A Journey with the Lonely. The track was written, composed and produced by Lil Louis, featuring lead vocals by Joi Cardwell. The single was Lil Louis' third and final chart topper on the Billboard Hot Dance Club Play chart, reaching number one on November 14, 1992. On the UK singles chart, it peaked at number 74.

== Track listings ==
CD single (US)

1. Saved My Life (R+B Mix - The Happy Hip Hop Mix With Fade) 3:45
2. Saved My Life (R+B Mix - Happy Hip Hop Mix) 4:07
3. Saved My Life (The Lifesaver Radio Edit) 4:05
4. Saved My Life (Masters At Work Radio Mix) 3:54

CD Maxi (UK/Europe)

1. Saved My Life (Radio Edit) 3:23
2. Saved My Life (Vintage Mix) 5:57
3. Saved My Life (Hip Hop Adventure) 4:10
4. Saved My Life (Tres Amigos) 6:17
5. Saved My Life (Lifesaver Mix) 5:13
6. Saved My Life (Havana Mix) 7:17
