= M-Doc =

American rapper

- Born: Marc Williams
- Origin: Chicago, Illinois, U.S.
- Genres: Rap, R&B
- Occupations: Rapper, music producer
- Years active: 1988-active
- Labels: Smash, RCA

Marc Williams (known as M-Doc), is a rap artist and producer, who was signed to RCA Records and Smash Records in the 1990s. He scored minor chart success with the singles "Free", and "It's a Summer Thang" featuring Chantay Savage. He is currently the president of Indasoul Entertainment.

== Early life ==
Williams grew up on the South Side of Chicago, Illinois, and graduated from Whitney Young High School in 1987, where he played basketball and was nicknamed "Doc", because he liked NBA basketball star Julius Erving. Williams stated that he started off with a group of friends on the South Side, and used to go to his basement, where his father had enough equipment to get some beats together; they made eight different songs, put them on tape, and sold them at their high schools by hand. The group was called "BP3", because all three members were basketball players.

== Music career ==
Williams began his music career when local producer Steve "Silk" Hurley heard one of his tapes, and the two collaborated to record "It's Percussion", with Hurley handling the music, and Williams billed as "M-Doc" for the first time, rapping; the single came out on London's Jack Trax Records. He signed with Smash Records and released his debut album Universal Poet in 1991; the album featured two singles, "Are U Wid It?" (which sampled Prince's "I Wanna Be Your Lover"), and "Whatever U Need".

M-Doc then signed with RCA Records and released his second album, M. Doc Wit Stevio: C'mon Getcha Groove On in 1995, which featured the singles, "It's a Summer Thang" featuring Chantay Savage, and "Like 'Em Like That (Guess I'm Just a Freak)". In 1998, he released his third and final album Young, Black, Rich and Famous, which included the single "Free" (a Deniece Williams song), featuring Cristina Sanchez.

In the late 1990s, M-Doc produced remixes for Madonna, Janet Jackson and Keith Sweat; Billboard called him "one of the R&B worlds top remixers." In 1996, he produced music in the Midway video game NBA Hangtime.

== Discography ==
Albums

- 1991: Universal Poet (Smash Records)
- 1995: M. Doc Wit Stevio: C'mon Getcha Groove On (RCA Records)
- 1998: Young, Black, Rich and Famous (Alexia Records/Indasoul Records)

Singles

- 1988: "It's Percussion"
- 1991: "Are U Wid It?"
- 1992: "Whatever U Need"
- 1994: "It's a Summer Thang" (featuring Chantay Savage)
- 1995: "Like 'Em Like That (Guess I'm Just a Freak)"
- 1998: "Free" (featuring Christina Sanchez)
