= Eric Miller (musician) =

American musician and disc jockey

Eric Miller (born in Chicago, Illinois) is an American house music DJ, record producer and remixer. As E-Smoove, he worked for a number of years with Steve "Silk" Hurley and Maurice Joshua, before he hit the U.S. Hot Dance Music/Club Play chart in 1998 with "Deja Vu", which climbed to No. 16. The song reached No. 63 on the UK Singles Chart. His next U.S. dance chart entry came in 2002, when "Insatiable" hit No. 1. "Insatiable" was released under the pseudonym Thick Dick. It peaked at No. 35 in the UK. Both tracks featured lead vocals by his wife Latanza Waters.

Also in 2002, he appeared under another pseudonym, Praise Cats. The track "Shined on Me" first peaked at No. 56 in the UK in 2002, but on the remix featuring Andrea Love, it reached No. 24 there in May 2005.

== See also ==
- List of number-one dance hits (United States)
- List of artists who reached number one on the US Dance chart
