= Das EFX =

American hip hop/rap duo

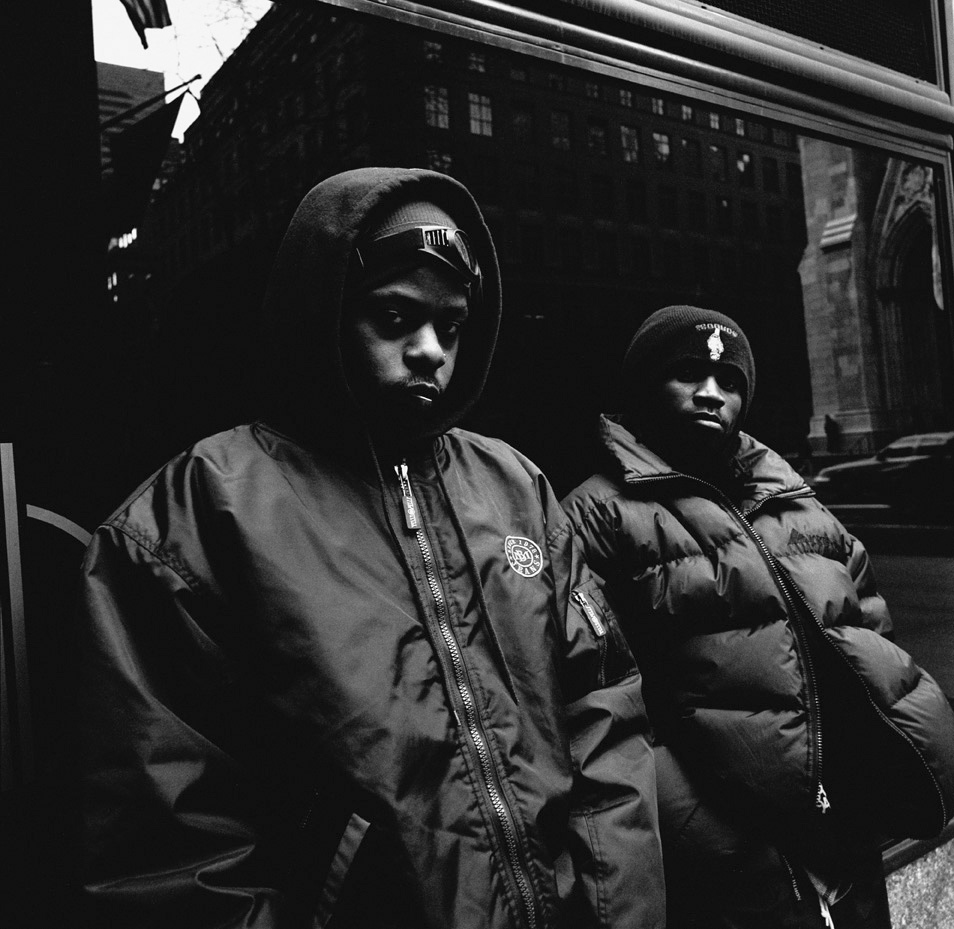
- Das EFX in 1997; from left to right: Skoob, Krazy Drayz

Background information
- Origin: Petersburg, Virginia, U.S.
- Genres: East Coast hip hop; hardcore hip hop
- Years active: 1988–present
- Labels: East West America; Atlantic; Elektra
- Formerly of: Hit Squad
- Members: Dray; Skoob
- Website: "Krazy Drayz". Facebook.com.

Das EFX is an American hip hop duo. It consists of emcees Dray (also known as Krazy Drayz, born Andre Weston, September 9, 1970) and Skoob (also known as Books and Boogie Bang, born William "Willie" Hines, November 27, 1970). They named themselves "DAS" standing for "Dray and Skoob" and "EFX" meaning "effects". They rose to popularity in the early 1990s due to the duo's stream of consciousness lyrical delivery, which became one of the most influential lyrical styles in hip hop music at the time; as well as their affiliation with EPMD's Hit Squad. Their style combined intricate rhymes, sometimes mixed with made up words (especially ending with "-iggedy"), delivered with a fast-paced flow and numerous pop culture and hip hop culture references.

== History ==
Skoob hails from Brooklyn, New York City, while Dray hails from Teaneck, New Jersey. The duo met at Virginia State University in 1988 and began performing together. Das EFX caught the attention of EPMD at a local talent show where, despite losing the competition, the duo did well enough to convince EPMD to sign it to a recording contract. The duo gained critical and commercial fame with the release of the duo’s debut album Dead Serious, which highlighted its unusual rhyming style (which they nicknamed "sewage").

Dead Serious went platinum and its lead single, "They Want EFX," (which contains samples from James Brown's "Blind Man Can See It" and Malcolm McLaren's "Buffalo Gals") reached the top ten on the U.S. Billboard R&B chart, the Top 40 on the Billboard Hot 100 and No. 1 on the Hot Rap Tracks chart. Follow-up singles "Mic Checka" and "Straight Out the Sewer" did not chart on the Hot 100, but reached No. 1 and No. 3 on the Hot Rap Tracks chart, respectively.

The duo also made a guest appearance on the remix of Ice Cube's smash hit single "Check Yo Self". The song reached No. 20 on the Hot 100 and No. 1 on the Rap Tracks chart. The track peaked at No. 36 on the UK Singles Chart in August 1993 and sold over one million copies in the U.S.

As their career progressed, Das EFX's once-distinctive and unique lyrical delivery was imitated by several other artists and became more commonplace. Derailed by the popularity of their own style, the duo slowed down their fast-paced flow, eliminated the iggedy suffix and downplayed their cartoonish content on their second album, Straight Up Sewaside.

Around the time of their third album Hold It Down (which was far less commercially successful than their debut release), Das EFX found themselves caught in the middle of EPMD's ugly breakup. They ended up siding with PMD (Parrish Smith), and it led to a three-year absence from recording. They returned in 1998 with the album Generation EFX and followed up in 2003 with the album How We Do.

After a hiatus, the group went on an international tour with DJ Rondevu in 2006. In 2007, Krazy Drayz appeared on the East Coast remix of Nas' "Where Are They Now", alongside eleven other old-school rap artists: Dres, Monie Love, Chip Fu, Positive K, EST of Three Times Dope, Father MC, DoItAll of Lords of the Underground, DJ Spinderella, Rob Base, Mike G. of the Jungle Brothers, and Redhead Kingpin.

Das EFX toured the globe again in 2010. They reissued How We Do under the alternate title Old School Throwback on Spotify and other streaming services in 2015; both versions of the album featured Sean Paul on a song “The Memories Remain” which deals with the death of Skoob’s father.

Krazy Drayz released a solo album Showtime in 2012. It features Dres, Black Rob, Smif-N-Wessun, and Fredro Starr. As of 2022, Drayz’s most recent releases are collaborations with Ben Shorr, Phil Da Beat, DJ Tricky, and Kool Taj The Gr8, plus a 2019 posse cut coordinated by the Snowgoons that also featured PMD, A.G., El Da Sensei, Edo G, Outloud of Blahzay Blahzay, Craig G, Smoothe Da Hustler, and Mr. Cheeks. Skoob has not performed original material on record since Marco Polo’s remix of his solo song “How Can I Get Down”, which appeared in 2013.

== Influence ==
From the time of their debut in 1992 to 1993, several elements of their style were adopted by other hip-hop artists, including Lords of the Underground, Fu-Schnickens, Kris Kross, Common and even, to a lesser extent, Public Enemy. The 1996 BLACKstreet song "No Diggity", with "diggity" meaning "doubt", bears a title phonetically identical to the track "No Diggedy" on DAS EFX's 1995 release Hold It Down.

== Discography ==
- Dead Serious (1992)
- Straight Up Sewaside (1993)
- Hold It Down (1995)
- Generation EFX (1998)
- How We Do (2003) (reissued as Old School Throwback in 2015)
