= April Diamond =

American singer

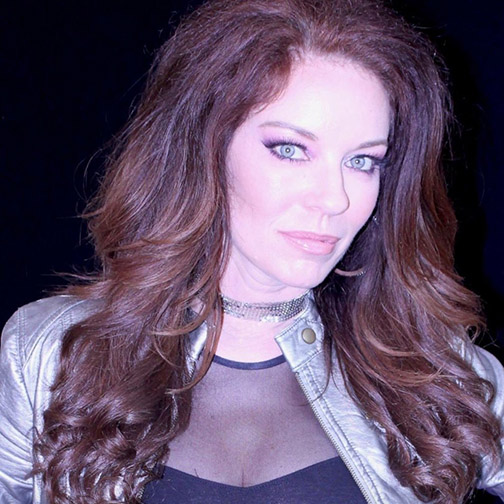
- April Diamond in Los Angeles 2018

Background information
- Born: Los Angeles, California, U.S.
- Origin: Los Angeles, California
- Genres: Pop, electronic dance
- Occupations: Musician, singer, songwriter
- Instruments: Vocals, piano
- Labels: Del Oro Music, Interscope
- Website: www.aprildiamond.com

April Diamond is an American singer. Her first single release Lose Control debuted on the Billboard magazine chart under the Hot Dance Club Play category on January 6, 2018.

The song was written and produced by David Longoria and remixed by Robert Eibach, Dave Audé and others. It climbed that chart on Billboard peaking at #27 on February 3, 2018 and remained on the chart for a total of 8 weeks. Lose Control received a nomination in the category of "Best Dance Song" in the 2017 Hollywood Music In Media Awards.

Diamond received two nominations for the category of Best Electronica/Dance Artist and one win for the category of Best Female Pop Artist Of The Year from the Los Angeles Music Awards.

Diamond was also featured on the theme song Now Or Never from the movie Bloodline: Now Or Never along with David Longoria, who also wrote the song.

She sang on the recording of the song We Are One with Grammy Winner David Longoria and more than 750 other artists and performed the song on the lawn of the White House on May 20, 2017.

== Career ==
April Diamond released her first single Lose Control in 2018. The song peaked at #27 on the Billboard Dance Club Play Chart on February 3rd, 2018. The remixers on the song included Grammy-winner Dave Aude, Grammy-winner Robert Eibach, Twisted Dee, Gustavo Scorpio, Majik Boys among others. The song was also nominated for a Hollywood Music In Media Award in the category of Best Dance Song in 2017.

Diamond's follow-up single, which is a remake of the Kiki Dee song I Got The Music In Me, features producer/trumpeter David Longoria and the award-winning show choir Power House from John Burroughs High School in Burbank, CA. The song reached number one on the Hot AC/AC National Radio Airplay charts, #17 on the New Music Weekly Hot 100 pop songs, #6 on the National Radio Hits Chart, #17 on the Independent Music Network Releases Top 40 charts in 2021. It was also the New Music Weekly Mainstream Top 30 Countdown Song Of The Year for 2021.

April Diamond released her single Feels So Good in 2024 and reached #1 on the Top AC40 National Radio Hits chart, as well as, the Mainstream Top 30 Independent Music Network Radio Chart as of April 10, 2024.

== Discography ==
| Release | Role | Date |
|---|---|---|
| Lose Control (single) | Main Artist | 2017 |
| Now Or Never (single) | Featured Artist | 2017 |
| I Got The Music In Me (single) | Main Artist | 2020 |
| We Are One (single) | Featured Artist | 2022 |
| I Got A Secret (single) | Main Artist, Songwriter | 2023 |
| Christmas (Is My Favorite Time Of Year) (single) | Main Artist | 2023 |
| Feels So Good (single) | Main Artist | 2024 |
