= Finding Cleveland =

- Promotional poster
- Directed by: Larissa Lam
- Screenplay by: Larissa Lam
- Produced by: Baldwin Chiu; Only Won
- Cinematography: Baldwin Chiu
- Edited by: Dwight Buhler
- Music by: Larissa Lam
- Production company: Cheerful Forest Productions
- Release date: 30 August 2015
- Running time: 13 minutes
- Country: United States
- Language: English

Finding Cleveland is a 2015 American documentary film about a Chinese American family's journey to search for their family roots. Instead of leading them to the Far East to a remote village in China, it took them to the deep south into the remote little town of Cleveland in the Mississippi Delta.

They uncover not only the history of their family, but also that of the early Chinese American settlers: an entire community caught between the black and white population. In addition to them dealing with the obvious racism, segregation, loneliness, depression, and financial burdens, they had to do it during a time when Congress enacted the only act in American history that explicitly targeted a specific ethnic group: the Chinese Exclusion Act of 1882.

The film had its world premiere at the 168 Film Festival on 30 August 2015 and has been shown at multiple film festivals. It continues to be shown at libraries, museums, churches, and schools. On May 18, 2017, it made its broadcast debut on PBS Mississippi. The film has sparked the creation of the full length film, Far East Deep South.

== Selected cast ==
- Only Won
- Larissa Lam

== Accolades ==
- 2015: Best Documentary Finalist, 168 Film Festival.
- 2015: Best Documentary Award, Asians on Film Festival.
- 2016: Best Documentary, Oxford Film Festival.
- 2016: Outstanding Film, Sacramento International Film Festival
- 2015: Official Selection, Philadelphia Asian Film Festival, Boston Asian American Film Festival, Chinese American Film Festival, Big Asian Film Festival
- 2016: Official Selection, DC Asians Pacific American Film Festival, Sacramento International Film Festival
