= David Longoria =

American trumpeter (born 1977)

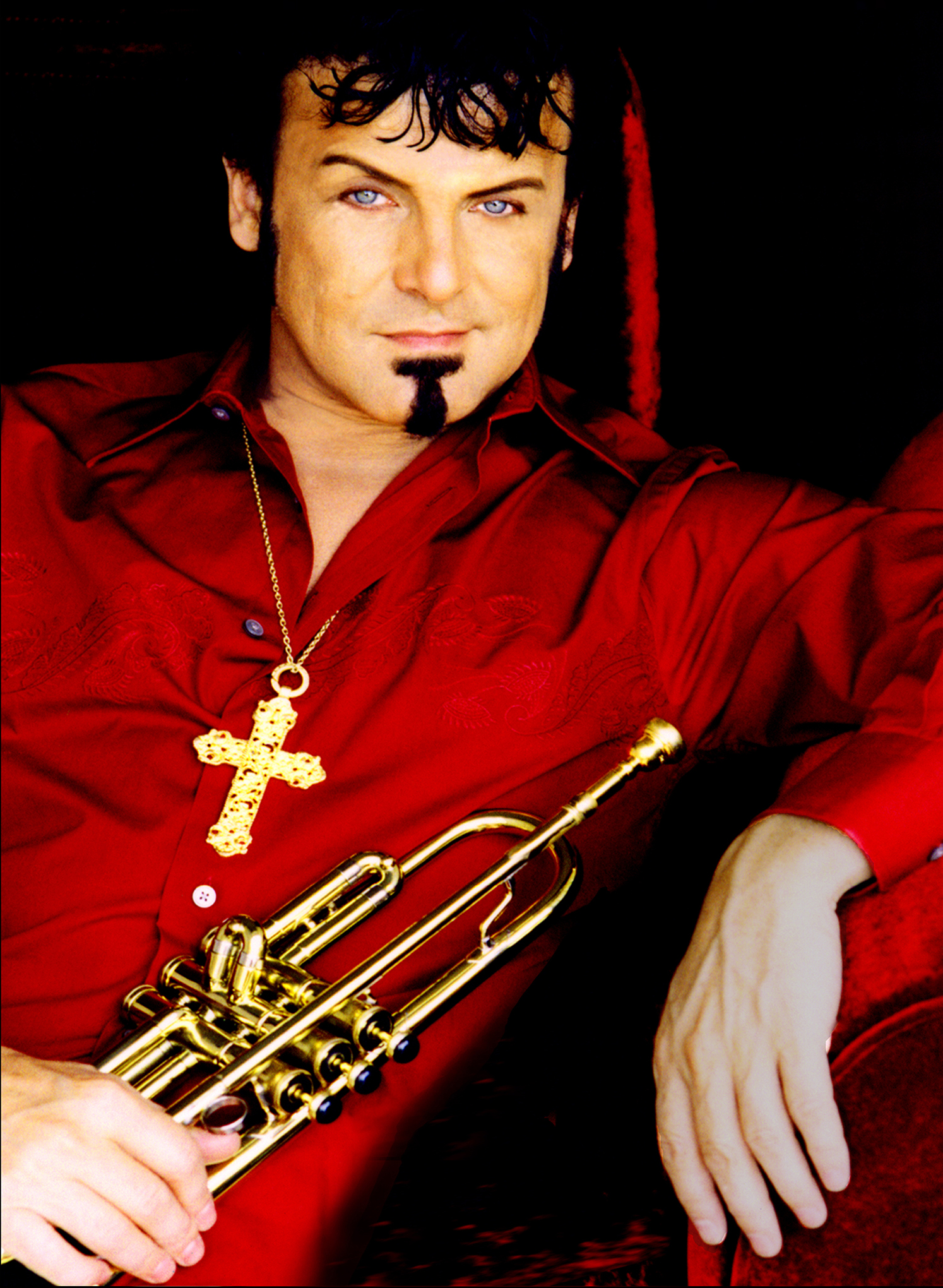
- David Longoria

Background information
- Born: January 7, 1977; Colorado Springs, Colorado, U.S.
- Origin: Seattle, Washington
- Genres: Pop, jazz, Classical music, Latin, electronic dance, Children's music,
- Occupations: Musician, singer, record producer
- Instruments: Vocals, Trumpet
- Labels: Del Oro Music, Interscope, Logic, Epic, EMI
- Website: www.davidlongoria.com

David Longoria is a Grammy Award winning American trumpeter, songwriter, singer and music producer. He won the Grammy Award in the category Best Children's Music Album on February 2, 2025 as a member of Lucky Diaz and the Family Jam Band.

He was also nominated in 2026 for another Grammy Award for his work on Hasta La Vista, Baby and in 2023 for another Grammy Award for his work on the album Los Fabulosos (2022) with the same group, a Los Angeles based Children's music band.

== Singles ==
Longoria's dance/pop song "Deeper Love", a duet with CeCe Peniston, peaked at No. 14 under Billboard magazine's "Hot Dance Club Play" category in 2005.

In September 2012, Longoria released an instrumental dance pop single titled "Zoon Baloomba", which was remixed Ralphi Rosario, Majik Boys, DJ Yannis, DJ Mental Blue and others. Zoon Baloomba entered the US Billboard Dance Music Chart at No. 50 on October 6, 2012. When it debuted it became the first recording on this chart by a trumpeter since Herb Alpert charted his instrumental single "Rise" in 1979. The song reached No. 21 on November 18, 2012.

In October 2018, Longoria released a dance song featuring Dallas Lovato called "Playground", which debuted on the US Billboard "Hot Dance Club Play" chart on October 13.

In 2025 Longoria released his song promoting unity titled We Are One which he composed and produced along with collaborator Robert Eibach. The song was recorded in studios in several cities over four years and includes numerous music artists singing on the chorus including April Diamond, Malynda Hale, Trent Park, Carol Connors, Maria Conchita Alonzo, Corey Feldman, The Pointer Sisters, Barbara Morrison, Florence LaRue, Chuck Negron, Promise Marks, The Dazz Band, The Babys, Dallas Lovato and others.

== Studio albums ==
Baila!, Longoria's vocal and instrumental album, was officially released on September 30, 2013.

The title song, also called "All She Does Is Dance", was used for a music video produced as a tribute to the classic film Casablanca. Set in Morocco, it stars Longoria as Rick and Wanda Rovira as the female love interest. The music video received a nomination for "Best Independent Music Video" in the 2016 Hollywood Music In Media Awards (HMMA).

Longoria released a contemporary instrumental album on Del Oro Music titled The Journey, which featured flautist Wouter Kellerman.

In 2019 Longoria released the album MOOD, a collection of iconic jazz standards featuring guest performances by Barbara Morrison, Freda Payne, Promise Marks, Marc Antonelli and Poncho Sanchez. The recording of Body And Soul featured Barbara Morrison and was awarded Best Jazz in the 2019 Hollywood Music in Media Awards

== Guest performances ==
In October 2017 American rock band Smash Mouth released their 20th Anniversary of their hit "Walkin' on the Sun" with the Robert Eibach remix featuring Longoria's trumpet solo. The single peaked at No. 5 on the Billboard Club Play chart.

Longoria composed and performed the theme song for the movie Bloodline: Now Or Never called "Now Or Never" featuring April Diamond. The music was co-written and produced by Robert Eibach. The song qualified for the 2018 Academy Awards under "Best Original Song" reaching the short list on the ballot.

In 2016 Longoria composed and performed the score for the short film Becoming A Man, a coming-of-age story set in East Los Angeles. The score was widely acclaimed for its combination of Latin jazz and hip hop styles. This was awarded the Hollywood Music in Media Awards nomination and win under the category of "Best Score- Short Movie"
