= Edges of Darkness =

2008 American horror anthology film

- Movie poster
- Directed by: Blaine Cade; Jason Horton
- Written by: Blaine Cade; Jason Horton
- Produced by: Stephen Kayo
- Starring: Annemarie Pazmino; Lee Perkins; Michelle Rose
- Cinematography: James L. Bills
- Edited by: Jason Horton
- Music by: Pakk Hui
- Production companies: Gas Money Pictures; Zapruter Productions
- Distributed by: Shoreline Entertainment; Anchor Bay Entertainment (U.S. DVD)
- Release date: 2008
- Running time: 87 minutes
- Country: United States
- Language: English

Edges of Darkness is a 2008 American independent horror anthology film directed by Jason Horton and Blaine Cade. The film consists of three interconnected stories set during a zombie apocalypse.

== Plot ==
Edges of Darkness follows three groups of survivors sheltering in an apartment complex during a zombie apocalypse. With their food supply dwindling, a vampire couple kidnaps a young girl, intending to feed on her slowly. Dean, an obsessive horror writer, isolates himself with his neglected wife, Dana, and installs a mysterious new processor that allows his computer to run without electricity, only to discover that it draws its power from living beings. Heather, a survivalist, rescues a young mother and her son from zombies and brings them back to the apartment complex, where she learns that the pair are being pursued by a group of renegade priests who intend to destroy the boy.

== Cast ==
- Alonzo F. Jones as Stan
- Shamika Ann Franklin as Stellie
- Annemarie Pazmino as Natalie
- Lee Perkins as Paul
- Michelle Rose as Heather
- Xavier Jones as Marcus
- Jay Costelo as Dean
- Alisha Gaddis as Dana
- Robert Kitchen as Priest
- Wayne Baldwin as Morris
- Damon Burks as Daemon

== Production ==
Principal photography had wrapped by February 2007. A test screening was held in June 2007, while work continued on the score and the final visual-effects shots.

Post-production was prolonged by difficulties finding a composer. Horton said that it took five attempts to find a suitable composer and that the scoring process delayed completion by more than six months. The film was completed in February 2008.

== Release ==
Edges of Darkness received its UK television premiere in early 2009.

Anchor Bay Entertainment released the film on DVD in the United States on September 22, 2009.

== Reception ==
Mike Phalin of Dread Central rated the film three out of five stars. He criticized the computer-centered segment as tonally inconsistent with the rest of the anthology, but praised the vampire and Antichrist storylines and considered the film unusually inventive for a low-budget zombie production.

Peter Dendle, writing in The Zombie Movie Encyclopedia: 2000–2010, described the film's stories as thin and largely disconnected, although he considered the film an improvement over Rise of the Undead.
