= Chinese Americans in the Mississippi Delta =

Ethnic group in Mississippi

The Mississippi Delta Chinese are a small community of Chinese Americans that has lived in the Mississippi Delta region since the late 19th century. A related population of Chinese Americans lives across the Mississippi River in the Arkansas Delta and the nearby city of Memphis, Tennessee.

== History ==
Tri-State Chinese Directory of Mississippi, Arkansas, and Tennessee

The earliest Chinese settlers in the Mississippi Delta were laborers recruited by cotton planters to supplement the recently emancipated African freedmen during Reconstruction. The move to recruit Chinese laborers was a result of the 1869 Chinese Labor Convention, a three day event held in Memphis, Tennessee where plantation owners from several Southern states met to discuss the use of Chinese coolies as labor replacement. Plantation owners proposed that Chinese laborers would be an ideal replacement for African labor due to the similarities of environmental climate between the American South and the Southern regions of China where they originated. Similar to migration patterns of other early Chinese Americans, the first Chinese immigrants were largely peasants and merchants from the Siyi region of Guangdong province in South China. This initial wave of immigration consisted of men who worked in Mississippi and sent most of their income back to their families in China. Arriving in a country with a strict binary racial hierarchy, the Chinese were often classified as "colored" in early government records although racial classification varied by region along the Mississippi Delta.

Towards the end of the 1870s, Chinese laborers protested and rebelled against the harsh working conditions of the plantations, eventually abandoning work sites. This resulted in the Chinese seeking new economic opportunities and they began opening small family-owned grocery stores in the many small towns of the Delta. Chinese families began moving to the Delta in the early 1900s, and most modern Mississippi Delta Chinese are the descendants of Chinese who arrived in Mississippi during this time. Until the end of the 1900s, Chinese-owned groceries could be found in every Delta city and town. While these grocery stores served both white and black customers, they occupied a niche market during the Jim Crow era, serving black customers when white grocery stores commonly would not. Chinese children were originally segregated from the white public schools,which may have been a motivating factor in regional migration of Chinese families seeking better education. In Lum v. Rice it was determined that the Mississippi Delta Chinese Lum family's children could not attend a white public school, which motivated them to then move to Arkansas. Segregated Chinese schools were built in Greenville and Cleveland, in part by collective efforts by the local Chinese community through church resources. However, these schools were closed and Chinese children were allowed to attend white schools and white colleges after World War II.

The population of the Mississippi Delta Chinese exploded after the war. Many young Chinese men from the Mississippi Delta served as soldiers during the Second World War, and many women from China married these soldiers and settled in the Delta as war brides after the war. By the 1970s there were as many as 3,000 Americans of Chinese descent living in the Delta, especially children who were raised in the Delta. For decades the Mississippi Delta Chinese community was one of the largest Chinese American communities in the American South, but since then, many families have moved to larger cities in Texas, the West Coast, and the Northeast. Most of the historic Chinese groceries have already closed, and only a few families remain in the Delta.

== Ethnic identity ==
Given the strict racial segregation of the Jim Crow South, Chinese immigrants and their descendants had to make choices about how to move through society, where to build communities and relationships, and how to educate their children. Oral histories collected over the years, such as Chinese Grocers from the Southern Foodways Alliance (2010) and Chinese Oral Histories collected by Delta State University reflect the diversity of choices made by Chinese American residents regarding their ethnic identity, including how and if to teach their children to read and write Chinese, whether or not to attend Lucky Eleven events, how to honor their ancestors, how to source and cook Chinese food, and how to negotiate relationships with white adults and children.

== Institutions ==
The Mississippi Delta Chinese Heritage Museum is housed on the campus of Delta State University.

== In media ==
Dolly Li made the documentary The Untold Story of America’s Southern Chinese for Al Jazeera Plus in 2017. She was used as a consultant for the 2025 film Sinners so the Chinese community was properly portrayed.

== Notable people ==
- Sam Chu Lin, journalist and news anchor
- Martin F. Jue, entrepreneur and inventor
- Josephine Jue, NASA computer scientist
- Only Won, producer of Far East Deep South
