= Hum Ek Hain =

Hum Ek Hain (lit. 'We are one') may refer to:

- Hum Ek Hain (1946 film), an Indian Hindi-language drama directed by P. L. Santoshi, starring Dev Anand, Kamala Kotnis and Durga Khote
- Hum Ek Hain (2004 film), a Pakistani Urdu-language action film directed by Syed Noor

== See also ==
- We Are One (disambiguation)
