= Lucky Diaz and the Family Jam Band =

Children's musical group

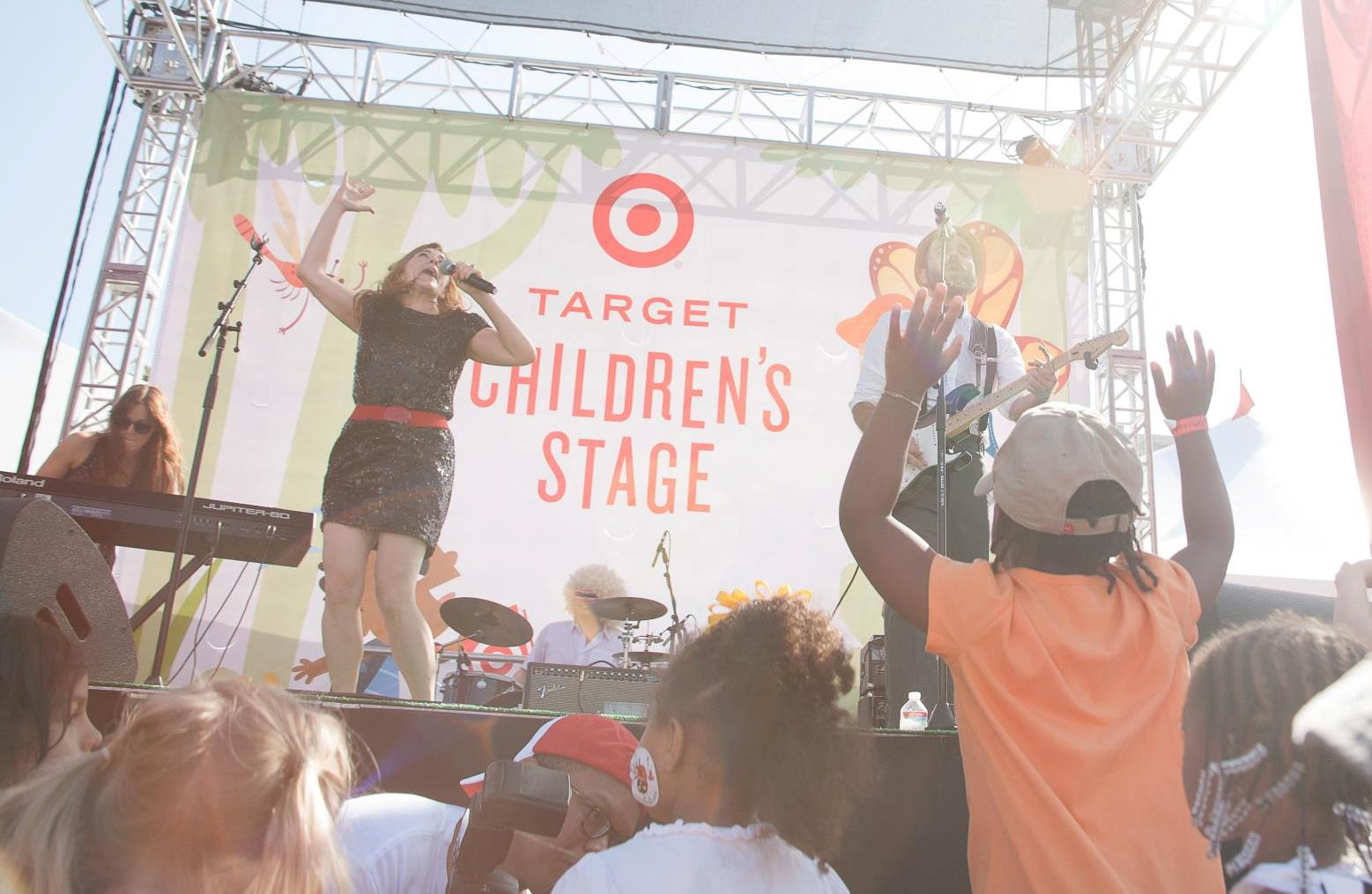

Background information
- Origin: Los Angeles, California, United States
- Genres: Children's; Latin; Kindie
- Years active: 2010–present
- Members: Lucky Diaz; Alisha Gaddis
- Past members: Theron Derrick; Deacon Marrquin; Robert Eibach; Kurtis Keber; Michael Klooster; Michael Farkas; Gee Rabe; Joe "Harpcat" Echevarria; Eric Morones; Wesley Switzer; David Longoria; Henry Hofman; Kenny Siegal; Eddie Perez
- Website: http://luckydiazmusic.com

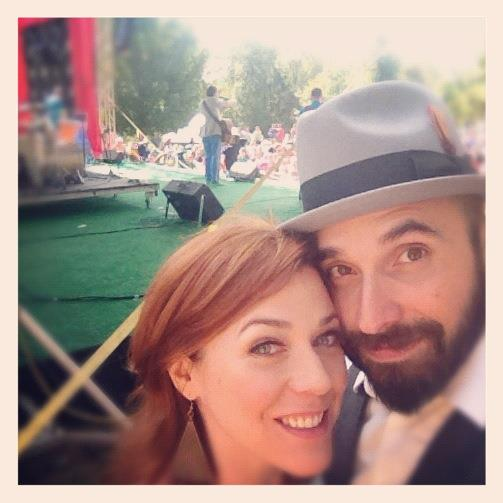
Alisha Gaddis and Lucky Diaz

Lucky Diaz and the Family Jam Band (also known as Lucky Díaz y La Familia Música, and The Lucky Band) is the husband and wife team of Lucky Diaz and Alisha Gaddis. The Grammy and Emmy-award-winning duo plays bilingual indie music for kids described by The Washington Post as "a hip-shaking, head-bopping, Los Angeles–based explosion of 'kindie' rock." They are known for whimsical children's songs which they also incorporated into a television show. Diaz graduated from Berklee College of Music and Gaddis graduated from NYU's Tisch School of the Arts.

Billboard recognized the band as among Latin Children's Music Artists You Should Know, describing them as "kind of like a bilingual B-52's for kids" and People Magazine listed their album A Potluck first in cool kids albums.

== Awards ==
The Lishy Lou and Lucky Too television show has won multiple Emmys. Gaddis also won an Emmy for Best Performer for her work on the show.

They won a 2013 Latin GRAMMY Award for Best Latin Children's Album for ¡Fantastico! making Diaz and Gaddis the first Americans to win a Latin GRAMMY. Their album Adelante was a 2015 Best Latin Children's Album GRAMMY Nominee at the 16th Annual Latin GRAMMY Awards. In 2019, they won their second Latin Grammy Award for the album Buenos Diaz under the name The Lucky Band. The album Paseo Lunar was nominated for a 2020 Latin Grammy Award in the Children's category making this the fourth nomination for The Lucky Band.

The albums Crayon Kids (2021) and Los Fabulosos (2022) were nominated in the Best Children's Album category for the 64th Grammy Awards and 65th Grammy Awards respectively.

Their album Brillo, Brillo! (2024) won the 67th Grammy Awards in the Best Children's Music Album Category making this their first win along with seventh previous nomination between the Grammys and Latin Grammys, which they have twice won.

== Activism ==
Along with Polly Hall and Andrew Barkan (Andrew and Polly) and CJ Pizarro (Mista Cookie Jar), Diaz and Gaddis produced the album Hold Tight, Shine Bright to help separated immigrant families and promote "the preservation and promotion of love, hope and family." The proceeds will go to Refugee and Immigrant Center for Education and Legal Services (RAICES) to be used for legal aid for families affected by the current immigration crisis.

== Television appearances ==
Diaz and Gaddis co-executive produced and co-starred in the live-action television show inspired by their act called Lishy Lou and Lucky Too. It centers around the characters Lishy Lou, Lucky, and their friend Thingamajig and teaches values, social skills, and Spanish through music and dancing.

Their song "Falling" was featured in a Coca-Cola commercial.

== Additional and touring members ==
Touring and additional band members have included Theron Derrick.

== Discography ==
- Luckiest Adventure (April 2010) CD Only
- Oh Lucky Day (April 2011)
- A Potluck (May 2012)
- ¡Fantastico! (May 2013) – Best Latin Children's Album GRAMMY Winner, 2013
- Lishy Lou and Lucky Too (October 2013)
- Aquí, Allá (May 2014)
- Adelante (May 2015) – Best Latin Children's Album GRAMMY Nominee, 2015
- Greatest Hits Vol 1 (July 2016)
- Made in LA (July 2017)
- Hold Tight, Shine Bright (August 2018)
- Buenos Diaz (April 2019)
- Paseo Lunar (May 2020)
- Crayon Kids (June 2021)
- Los Fabulosos (April 2022)
- Brillo, Brillo! (May 2024)

== Books ==
Lucky Diaz published his first children's book "Paletero Man" with HarperCollins Children's Books, in June 2021. His book La Guitarrista was released in 2023, also on HarperCollins.

== Personal life ==
Diaz and Gaddis met at The Comedy Store in Los Angeles, California. They married in 2012 and are raising two children together.
