= Stay with It =

American political catchphrase

Stay with It is a campaign in the United States intended to encourage and motivate engineering students to stay with the field of study and graduate with an engineer's degree.

It is a collaboration between the President's Council on Jobs and Competitiveness, the private sector and academia.

It officially launched on March 14, 2012, with a Day of Engineering at the Georgia Institute of Technology, and made available to a nationwide audience through a webcast on Facebook Live. The webcast opened with a message from President Barack Obama.

Major General Charles F. Bolden, Jr., Administrator of the National Aeronautics and Space Administration, noted the occasion, saying that his message to students is simple: "Stay With It! Stay with your studies. Stay with your research. Stay with your dreams as you prepare to take your rightful place as the next great generation of American engineers, innovators and leaders."

Congresswoman Doris Matsui addressed students after watching Only Won perform "I Wanna Be an Engineer" at the Sacramento State Stay With It event. "We need you, the country needs you – and engineering is not boring, it's fun. Engineers dream up, invent and build technologies that change the world. We will continue to lead, but a lot depends on the people who are studying engineering. … I encourage you to Stay with it – and dream!"
