= Majik Boys =

American DJ/remix group

- Genres: Dance Club
- Years active: 2008-Current
- Members: Mike Zaplatosch aka DJ Zapp; Andy Garcia; DJ Jeremy Martorano

Majik Boys is an American DJ and remix group, playing at clubs and on internet radio channels. It was founded in 2008 by producers Mike Zaplatosch and Andy Garcia (formerly Zapp & Vice) and Billboard Reporting DJ Jeremy Martorano. Mike and Andy have produced hits for Rihanna, Daphne Rubin-Vega, Joanna Krupa, Lauren Hildebrandt, David Longoria, Dare 2B Dif'rnt, and Georgie Porgie. Their Hi-NRG club sound has been influenced by Spencer & Hill, Bimbo Jones, Soul Seekerz, Digital Dog, Chris Cox, Tony Moran, The Sound Factory, and Almighty. Majik Boys' first remix to reach top 5 on the US Billboard Club Chart was Rihanna's "Breakin Dishes".

Mike and Jeremy of the Majik Boys emit a weekly syndicated mixshow on five popular internet dance stations: iPartyRadio.com, iDanceRadio.fm, GayInternetRadioLive.com, 1Club.fm, and ZFM (Australia). Jeremy has been DJing for 17 years and retouches much of what he plays to give it a hi-NRG, "hands in the air" sound.

== Remixography ==
=== Released ===
- Manon ft Joanna Krupa "I'll Be Around" (Dauman Music 11/09) PROMO
- Darren Ockert "Celebrity DuJour" (Shark Meat Records 10/09)
- Kaatchi "Be Free" (ISV Entertainment 10/09)
- Unit-911 "Woof! (Give It To Me)" (ISV Entertainment 10/09)
- Georgie Porgie "Brand New Day" (Music Plant 8/09) #20 Billboard Club Chart
- Annick "Wonder" (ISV Entertainment 8/09)
- Jonathan Luke "Joy Toy 2.0" (Royal Lush Productions 7/09)
- Evan Cowden "Dance Floor, Dance Whore}" (BOBD Productions 6/09)
- Rihanna "Breakin Dishes 2009" (Island) PROMO #4 Billboard Club Chart
- Mike Bordes ft Angela Severiano "Don't Know What U Got" (Deify Records 4/09)
- Shelina "Vivir Sin Tu Amor" (Heavy Records 4/09)
- amberRose Marie "I Wanna Be A DJ" (Catz 4/09) #14 Billboard Club Chart
- Lauren Hildebrandt "Boyshorts" (Red Wallet 2/09)
- Neil Sean Experience "My Arms Keep Missing You" (Klone 1/09)
- Lovari "Move Your Body" (Sound Patrol Records 3/10) - #5 ZipDJ US Club Charts

=== To be released ===
- Cynthia Miller "Deny You"
- CiJay "Let It Be"
- Beatnik Castle ft Francilia "Will U Be Mine"
- CMG ft Carol Douglas "Tell Me"
- David Longoria "Tuggawar"
- Dare 2B Dif'rnt "Running Up That Hill 2009 (Sirenia)
- Daphne Rubin-Vega "Can U Feel It" (Dauman Music)
- Lourdes - Bajo La Luna

== Mixshows ==
- iPartyRadio.com / Saturdays 2am (Central)
- iDanceRadio.fm / Saturdays 8pm (EST)
- GayInternetRadioLive.com aka G.I.R.L. / Tues 8-10pm, Thur 11pm-1am, Sat 2-4pm (EST)
- 1Club.fm (Ibiza Channel) / Mondays 3pm
- ZFM Australia/ Saturdays 7pm (AEST)
