= Larissa Lam =

American talk show host and music executive

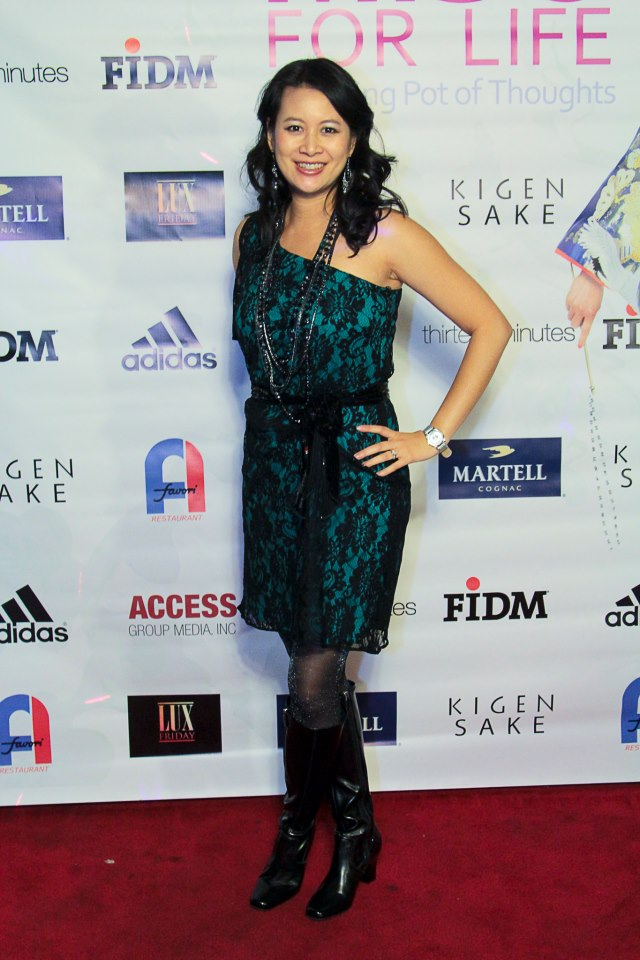
- Lam in 2012

Background information
- Born: Larissa Lam
- Genres: Dance-pop, R&B, jazz
- Occupations: Singer, Songwriter, Producer, TV Host
- Label: LOG Records
- Website: larissalam.com

Larissa Lam is an American singer, songwriter, talk show host, music executive, filmmaker, and producer from Diamond Bar, California. She won the 2015 Hollywood Music in Media Award in the Best Dance Song category for her song "I Feel Alive". She was named Best Vocalist of the Month by SingerUniverse Magazine in November 2015. Lam is one of the hosts for radio advice show, U-Talk Radio.

She released her fourth solo album of 12 original songs, Love and Discovery, on June 16, 2015. She has released three previous solo albums On the Way Up (2001), Thankful to be Live (2003), and Revolutionary (2004). A remix version of Lam's song, "Breathing More" appears in the video game Dance Dance Revolution Universe 2. She has also composed instrumental music for the Oprah Winfrey Show, The Dr. Oz Show, TLC, and The Daily 10 on the E! Channel.

Lam is known as the "Singing CFO". She was the former Chief Financial Officer of EDM label, NSOUL Records.

She was a lead singer in the group Nitro Praise which was produced by acclaimed DJ Scott Blackwell. She recorded songs for Nitro Praise 5, Nitro Praise Live!, and Nitro Praise Christmas 2. She toured as a member of Nitro Praise alongside Maximillian, JR Barbee and Danielle Pericelli.

== Early life ==
Larissa Lam grew up in Diamond Bar, CA. She graduated from UCLA with a degree in business economics.

== Record label ==
LOG Records
- Founded: 2000
- Founder: Larissa Lam
- Genre: Dance, EDM, Hip-hop, Rock, R&B, Pop
- Country of origin: United States
- Location: Los Angeles
- Official website: LOG Records Website

Lam is also the founder of her own record label, LOG Records. It was represents artists in the Dance, EDM, Hip-Hop, Rock, Pop and R&B genres.

In 2010, Lam executive produced a hip hop album for Only Won. Only Won and Larissa Lam launched a viral music video title "Cantonese Boy" which was a parody of the Grammy winning song American Boy by Kanye West and Estelle. After being seen performing "Cantonese Boy" in Chinatown, Larissa Lam was asked to perform at the 2010 Green Globe Film Awards as they honored Asians in film and entertainment.

In 2012, Lam produced two songs for Only Won that was released on the video game Sleeping Dogs.

In 2013, Lam produced the song "JUN BAY" (aka: Get ready) that was featured on the film Dead Man Down and composed original music for the animated film, "The Monkey Prince".

In 2015, Lam released of her fourth solo album produced by David Longoria titled, Love & Discovery. The album features remixes by Robert Eibach.

== Discography and releases ==
| Cat No. | Artist | Title | Date | Configuration |
|---|---|---|---|---|
| 1 | Larissa Lam | On the Way Up | 2001 | LP |
| 2 | Larissa Lam | Thankful to be Live | 2003 | LP |
| 3 | Larissa Lam | Revolutionary | 2004 | LP |
| 4 | Compilation | Beautiful Faith | 2008 | EP |
| 5 | Only Won | Lyrical Engineer | 2010 | LP (Producer) |
| 6 | Only Won | Crush em Like Godzilla | 2011 | Single (Producer) |
| 7 | Only Won | JUN BAY | 2012 | Single (Producer) |
| 8 | Larissa Lam | Heading for Sunshine | 2012 | Single |
| 9 | Larissa Lam | I Feel Alive | 2015 | Single |
| 10 | Larissa Lam | Love & Discovery | 2015 | LP |

- Engineer (Rocketeer) - Only Won Parody Cover (2013)
- Airplanes - One Truth Cover (July 28, 2010)
- Only Won - The Lyrical Engineer (Jan 1, 2010)
- Beautiful Faith (November 14, 2008)
- On the Way Up (June 5, 2001)

She also appears on Gone - Music from the Motion Picture (2002).

== Hosting ==
She was one of the original hosts of the talk show, Top 3, which airs on JUCE TV formerly called, JCTV. She also starred in Season 1 and 2 on the JCTV reality show, Cruise with a Cause. She is one of the hosts of UTalk Radio, an advice show for young adults.

== Film maker ==
In 2015, Lam made her directorial debut and co-produced with a Documentary short titled, Finding Cleveland with Only Won. It garnered multiple nominations for Best Documentary. The story started as a journey for Only Won's search for his family roots, but instead of taking him to the far east, it took him into the deep south of Cleveland, MS. While the 14-minute documentary focuses on the family's discoveries about their roots, it also touches on a broader history, such as the treatment of Chinese immigrants in the region and the role the 1882 Chinese Exclusion Act played in that. She directed a feature film called Far East Deep South that was released in 2020.

== Personal life ==
Lam is married to hip-hop artist Only Won. The couple currently reside in Los Angeles, California.
