= Hollywood Music in Media Awards =

Award organization

- Current: 17th Hollywood Music in Media Awards
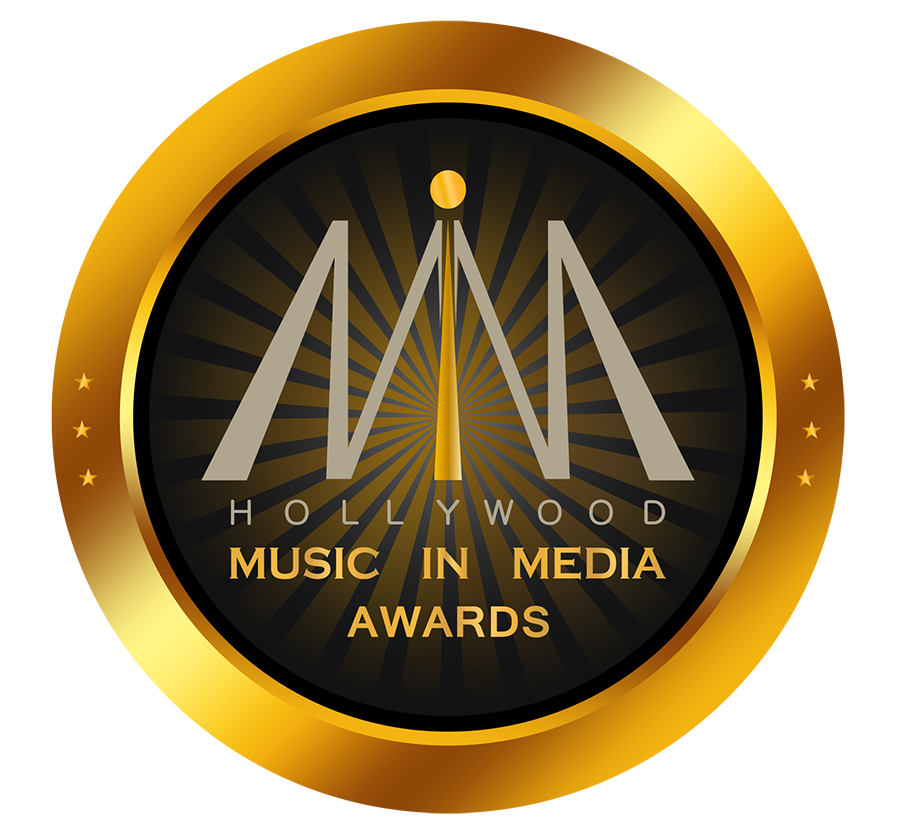
- Awarded for: Original music in visual media
- Location: Hollywood, California
- Country: United States
- First award: 2009
- Website: www.hmmawards.com

The Hollywood Music in Media Awards (HMMA) is an award organization honoring original music (Song and Score) in all forms visual media including film, TV, video games, trailers, commercial advertisements, documentaries, music videos and special programs. The HMMA was the first to include Outstanding Music Supervision as featured award categories. HMMA nominations and winners have historically been representative of key awards shows announced months later. The annual HMMA main event, held the week before Thanksgiving, features live music performances, celebrity presenters, tributes to music industry icons and awards for composers, songwriters and performers. The 2023 winners were announced on November 15.

The HMMA formerly celebrated emerging, independent artists for creative and innovative contributions in genre categories. The Hollywood Independent Music Awards (HIMA) is now an extension of the HMMA, honoring independent artists, composers, songwriters, record labels, and technical recording professionals around the globe for their creative contributions to independent music.

== Categories ==
=== Score ===
- Best Original Score – Feature Film
- Best Original Score – Independent Film
- Best Original Score – Animated Film
- Best Original Score – Sci-Fi/Fantasy Film
- Best Original Score – Horror Film
- Best Original Score – Documentary
- Best Original Score – Independent Film (Foreign Language)
- Best Original Score – TV Show/Limited Series
- Best Original Score – Animated Short Film
- Best Original Score – Documentary Short Film
- Best Original Score – Video Game
- Best Original Score/Song – Mobile Game

=== Song ===
- Best Original Song – Feature Film
- Best Original Song – Independent Film
- Best Original Song – Animated Film
- Best Original Song – Documentary
- Best Original Song – TV Show/Limited Series
- Best Original Song – Video Game
- Best Original Song/Score – Commercial Advertisement
- Best Original Song – Short Film
- Best Original Song – Onscreen Performance

=== Music Supervision ===
- Best Music Supervision – Film
- Best Music Supervision – Television

=== Other ===
- Best Music Documentary/Special Program
- Best Educational/Entertainment Exhibits or Theme Park Rides
- Best Main Title Theme — TV Show/Limited Series
- Best Main Title Theme — TV Show (Foreign Language)
- Best Music Video (Independent)
- Best Live Concert for Visual Media

== Selected winners ==
=== 2008 ===
- Original Score – Film – Jeff Beal (Appaloosa)
- Original Score – TV – Jim Dooley (Pushing Daisies)
- Original Score – Video Game – Wataru Hokoyama (Afrika)
- Original Song – Film – "Trust Your Stomach" (Nick & Nora's Infinite Playlist) Written and performed by Marching Band
- Original Song – TV – "Every Time It Gets Real" (Ghost Whisperer) Written and performed by Ronny Morris
- Original Song – Video Game – "Logan's Shadow" (Dark Mirror) Written and performed by Azam Ali
- Outstanding Music Supervisor – Film – Dave Jordan (Iron Man, The Incredible Hulk)
- Outstanding Music Supervisor – Television – Gary Calamar (House, True Blood, Dexter, Swingtown)
- Outstanding Music Supervision – Video Game – Steve Schnur (Madden NFL)
- Outstanding Career Achievement Award – Chuck Negron

=== 2009 ===
- Original Score – Film – Clinton Shorter (District 9)
- Original Score – TV – Nathan Barr (True Blood)
- Original Score – Video Game – Jesper Kyd (Assassin's Creed II)
- Original Song – Film – "When You Find Me" (Adam) Written by Kevin Griffin and Joshua Radin, performed by Joshua Radin
- Original Song – TV – "Lie to Me" (Lie to Me) Written by Stacy Wilde and David Bellochio, performed by Stacy Wilde
- Original Song – Video Game – "I Am the One" (Dragon Age: Origins) Written by Inon Zur and Aubrey Ashburn, performed by Aubrey Ashburn
- Original Song – Commercial Advertisement – "2 Scoops" Written by Peter Holmes, performed by Michelle Harding
- Best Music Video – Steve Rushton – "Ready to Rock"
- Outstanding Music Supervision – Film – Alex Patsavas (Twilight)
- Outstanding Music Supervision – TV – PJ Bloom (Glee, Nip/Tuck, United States of Tara, CSI: Miami, Lincoln Heights)
- Outstanding Music Supervision – Video Game – Simon Pressey (Dragon Age: Origins)
- Outstanding Music Supervision – Movie Trailer – Heather Kreamer / Mocean (Zombieland)
- Outstanding Career Achievement Award – Film Composing – John Debney
- Outstanding Career Achievement Award – Music Artist – Dave Mason
- Special Recognition – Vanguard Award – Immediate Music

=== 2010 ===
- Original Score – Film – Hans Zimmer (Inception)
- Original Score – Indie/Short/Documentary – Christophe Beck (Waiting for Superman)
- Original Score – TV – Steffan Fantini, Marc Fantini and Scott Gordon (Criminal Minds)
- Original Score – Video Game – Ramin Djawadi (Medal of Honor)
- Original Song – Film – "Bangers, Beans & Mash" (Get Him to the Greek) Written by Jason Segel and Kyle Workman, performed by Infant Sorrow featuring Russell Brand
- Original Song – TV – "Grim Reaper" (Crash) Written and performed by Keaton Simons
- Original Song – Video Game – "With Hearts Sublime" (Legend of the Guardians) Written by Winifred Phillips and Winnie Waldron, performed by Winifred Phillips
- Original Song – Commercial Advertisement – "Magic" Written and performed by Mozella
- Best Music Video – Jackie Tohn – "What is Love"
- Outstanding Music Supervision – Film – Julia Michels (Sex and the City 2)
- Outstanding Music Supervision – TV – Nora Felder and Budd Carr (Californication)
- Outstanding Music Supervision – Video Game – Steve Schnur (Medal of Honor)
- Outstanding Music Supervision – Movie Trailer – Mark Woollen & Associates (The Social Network)
- Lifetime Achievement Award – Artie Kornfeld
- Outstanding Career Achievement Award – Film Composing – Christopher Young

=== 2011 ===
- Original Score – Film – Mark Isham (Warrior)
- Original Score – Indie/Short/Documentary – Mark McKenzie (The Greatest Miracle)
- Original Score – TV – Ron Jones (Family Guy)
- Original Score – Video Game – Gerard Marino (Spider-Man: Edge of Time)
- Original Score – Mobile Video Game – Austin Wintory (The Blunder Brothers and the Curse of the Bog Frog)
- Original Song/Score – Movie Trailer – Taylor Dayne / Stacy and David Wilde – "Change the World" (The Help)
- Original Score – Special Feature – Steve Dancz / Placement Music – "Declaration Anthem" (Fox Super Bowl)
- Original Song – Film – "Collapsible Plans" (The Big Fix) Written by Becky Gebhardt, Mai Bloomfield, Mona Tavakoli, Chaska Potter and Jason Mraz, performed by Jason Mraz
- Original Song – TV – "Still Alright" (Necessary Roughness) Written and performed by Adam Merrin
- Original Song – Video Game – "The Coast of Ardashir" (Age of Conan: The Savage Coast of Turan) Written by Knut Avenstroup Haugen, performed by Aubrey Ashburn and the City of Prague Philharmonic Orchestra
- Song – Commercial Advertisement – "Passed Out" Written by Ryan Lawhon and Taylor Lawhon, performed by White Apple Tree
- Best Soundtrack Album – The Muppets (Walt Disney Records)
- Best Music Video – Ceej – "Perfect Two"
- Outstanding Music Supervision – Film – Jason Ruder and George Drakulias (Crazy, Stupid, Love)
- Outstanding Music Supervision – TV – Michelle Silverman and Bob Thiele Jr. (Sons of Anarchy)
- Lifetime Achievement Award – Smokey Robinson
- Best Techno/Electronica – Fatmagic

=== 2012 ===
- Original Score – Feature Film – Marco Beltrami (The Sessions)
- Original Score – Indie Film/Documentary/Short – Jennifer Thomas (Minuet)
- Original Score – TV Show – Kim Planert and Robert Duncan (Missing)
- Original Score – Video Game – Russell Brower, Derek Duke, Glenn Stafford, Joseph Lawrence, Neal Acree, Laurence Juber and Edo Guidotti (Diablo III)
- Original Score – Commercial Advertisement – Vladimir Persan (Definitely Dubai)
- Original Theme Music – TV Show – Thomas Newman (The Newsroom)
- Song/Score – Movie/Video Game Trailer – Samir El Borno and Lex van Dawn / Ivorysound (Ravaged)
- Song/Score – Mobile Video Game – Winifred Phillips and Winnie Waldron (Assassin's Creed III: Liberation)
- Song – Commercial Advertisement – "World Go By" Written and performed by Tom Luce
- Song – Feature Film – "Ready" (Woman Thou Art Loosed on the 7th Day) Written and performed by Summer Rona
- Song – Indie Film/Documentary/Short – "The Highest Pass" Written by Michael Mollura and Jon Anderson, performed by Jon Anderson
- Song – TV Show – "Traffic Lights" (90210) Written by Alexander Cardinale and Morgan Taylor Reid, performed by Alexander Cardinale
- Song – Video Game – "The Felucia Podraces" (Kinect Star Wars) Written by Gordy Haab
- Outstanding Music Supervision – Television – Liza Richardson (The Secret Circle, Parenthood, Hawaii Five-0, Awake, Touch)
- Outstanding Music Supervision – Film – Julia Michels and Julianne Jordan (Pitch Perfect)
- Best Soundtrack Album – Piranha 3DD (Lakeshore Records)

=== 2013 ===
- Original Score – Feature Film – Henry Jackman (Captain Phillips)
- Original Score – Indie Film/Documentary/Short – Gary Malkin and Dan Alvarez (Thrive: What on Earth Will it Take?)
- Original Score – TV Show/Digital Streaming Series – Jeff Beal (House of Cards)
- Original Score – Video Game – Jeff Broadbent (PlanetSide 2)
- Original Theme Music – TV Show – Bear McCreary (The Walking Dead)
- Song/Score – Mobile Video Game – Jeremy Tisser (Tricklab)
- Song/Score – Special Feature – Benjamin Wallfisch (Summer in February)
- Score – Commercial Advertisement – Don Bodin (Toyota RAV4 / Toyota Verso)
- Song – Feature Film – "Damaged" (Thanks for Sharing) Written and performed by Kathryn Gallagher
- Song – Indie Film/Documentary/Short – "The Courage to Believe" (Free China) Written by Tony Chen and Q'orianka Kilcher
- Song – TV Show – "Getaway" (Arrested Development) Written by David Schwartz, Mitch Hurwitz and Gabriel Mann
- Song – Video Game – "The War Still Rages Within" (Metal Gear Rising: Revengeance) Written by Jamie Christopherson
- Outstanding Music Supervision – Television – Mark Wike (NCIS: Los Angeles)
- Outstanding Music Supervision – Film – Robin Urdang (Thanks for Sharing)
- Best Soundtrack Album – Inside Llewyn Davis
- Best Techno/Electronica – Fatmagic

=== 2014 ===
- Original Score – Feature Film – Antonio Sanchez (Birdman)
- Original Score – Sci-Fi/Fantasy Film – Howard Shore (The Hobbit: The Desolation of Smaug)
- Original Score – Indie Film/Short – Julia Pajot (Impulsion)
- Original Score – Animated Film – John Powell (How to Train Your Dragon 2)
- Original Score – Documentary – Mark Adler (Merchants of Doubt)
- Song – Feature Film – "Lost Stars" (Begin Again) Written by Gregg Alexander & Danielle Brisebois
- Song – Animated Film – "Everything Is Awesome" (The Lego Movie) Written by JoLi, The Lonely Island, & Shawn Patterson
- Song – Documentary – "Coming Home" (Stopping for Death: The Nurses of Wells House Hospice) Written by Joel Martin
- Soundtrack Album – Guardians of the Galaxy (Various Artists)
- Outstanding Music Supervision – Television – Michelle Kuznetsky & Bob Thiele Jr. (Sons of Anarchy)
- Outstanding Music Supervision – Film – Season Kent (The Fault in Our Stars)
- Lifetime Achievement Award – Glen Campbell

=== 2015 ===
- Original Score – Feature Film – Dan Romer (Beasts of No Nation)
- Original Score – Sci-Fi/Fantasy Film – Junkie XL (Mad Max: Fury Road)
- Original Score – Independent Film – Isaias Garcia (The Moment I Was Alone)
- Original Score – Animated Film – Christophe Beck (The Peanuts Movie)
- Original Score – Documentary – Miriam Cutler (The Hunting Ground)
- Original Score – Short – Josue Vergara (Superheroes)
- Song – Feature Film – "See You Again" (Furious 7) Written by Andrew Cedar, DJ Frank E, Wiz Khalifa, & Charlie Puth
- Song – Animated Film – "Dancing in the Dark" (Home) Written by Ester Dean, Tor Erik Hermansen, MoZella, & Rihanna
- Song – Documentary – "Til It Happens to You" (The Hunting Ground) Written by Lady Gaga & Diane Warren
- Song – Dance – I Feel Alive by Larissa Lam
- Soundtrack Album – Fifty Shades of Grey (Various Artists)
- Outstanding Music Supervision – Television – Jen Ross (Empire)
- Outstanding Music Supervision – Film – Dana Sano (Fifty Shades of Grey)
- Outstanding Career Achievement Award – Earth, Wind & Fire

=== 2016 ===
- Original Score – Feature Film – Nicholas Britell (Moonlight)
- Original Score – Sci/Fi Fantasy Film – John Debney (The Jungle Book)
- Original Score – Independent Film – Scott Glasgow (The Curse of Sleeping Beauty)
- Original Score – Animated Film – Alexandre Desplat (The Secret Life of Pets)
- Original Score – Documentary – Mark Adler (Command and Control)
- Original Score – Short – Mariano Saulino (The Talk)
- Song Feature Film – "City of Stars" (La La Land) Written by Justin Hurwitz & Pasek & Paul.
- Song Animated Film – "Can't Stop the Feeling!" (Trolls) Written by Max Martin, Shellback, & Justin Timberlake.
- Song Documentary – “A Minute to Breathe” (Before the Flood) Written by Trent Reznor & Atticus Ross
- Song Sci-Fi, Fantasy, Horror Film - "Just like Fire" (Alice Through the Looking Glass) Written by Pink, Max Martin, Shellback & Oscar Holter
- Soundtrack Album – Suicide Squad (Various Artists)
- Soundtrack Contemporary Classical / Instrumental - Nicola Lerra (Believe)

=== 2017 ===
- Original Score – Feature Film – Oneohtrix Point Never (Good Time)
- Original Score – Sci/Fi Fantasy Film – Alexandre Desplat (The Shape of Water)
- Original Score – Independent Film – Corey Allen Jackson (Chuck)
- Original Score – Animated Film – Michael Giacchino (Coco)
- Original Score – Documentary – Philip Glass (Jane)
- Original Score – Short – David Longoria (Becoming a Man)
- Original Score – Video Game – Stephen Cox & Danny McIntyre (Farpoint)
- Original Song – Video Game – Thomas Parisch (composer) & Dimash Kudaibergen (singer) (Ocean over the Time (from Moonlight Blade video game))
- Song/Score – Mobile Video Game – Jonathan Geer (The Franz Kafka Videogame)
- Song Feature Film – "Stand Up for Something" (Marshall) Written by Diane Warren & Lonnie Lynn
- Song Animated Film – "Confident" (Leap) – Written by Demi Lovato, Ilya Salmanzadeh, Max Martin & Savan Kotecha
- Song Documentary – “Jump” (Step) Written by Raphael Saadiq, Taura Stinson, & Laura Karpman
- Song Independent Film – “Speak To Me” (Voice from the Stone) Written by Amy Lee
- Song Sci-Fi, Fantasy, Horror Film – "How Does a Moment Last Forever" (Beauty and the Beast) – Written by Alan Menken & Tim Rice
- Soundtrack Album – Baby Driver (Various Artists)
- Outstanding Music Supervision Television – Robin Urdang (The Marvelous Mrs. Maisel)
- Outstanding Music Supervision Film – Brian Ross (Lady Bird)

=== 2018 ===
- Original Score – Feature Film – Max Richter (Mary Queen of Scots)
- Original Score – Sci/Fi Fantasy Film – Ludwig Goransson (Black Panther)
- Original Score – Animated Film – Alexandre Desplat (Isle of Dogs)
- Original Score – Documentary – Cyrille Aufort (March of the Penguins: The Next Step)
- Original Song – Feature Film – "Shallow" (A Star is Born) Written by Lady Gaga, Mark Ronson, Anthony Rossomando, and Andrew Wyatt. Performed by Lady Gaga and Bradley Cooper
- Original Song – Documentary – "I’ll Fight" (RBG). Written by Diane Warren. Performed by Jennifer Hudson
- Original Song – Animated Film – "Stronger Than I Ever Was" (Sherlock Gnomes). Written by Elton John & Bernie Taupin. Performed by Mary J. Blige
- Original Song – Sci-Fi, Fantasy, Horror Film – "All the Stars" (Black Panther). Written by Kendrick Lamar, SZA, Sounwave, and Al Shux. Performed by Kendrick Lamar and SZA
- Music Documentary/Special Program – Quincy
- Original Score – TV Show/Limited Series – Nicholas Britell (Succession)
- Main Title Theme – TV Show/Limited Series – Carlos Rafael Rivera (Godless)
- Outstanding Music Supervision – Film – Julianne Jordan & Julia Michels (A Star is Born)
- Outstanding Music Supervision – Television – Jen Ross (Power)
- Soundtrack Album – Black Panther (Various Artists)
- Original Score – Independent Film – Thomas Ades (Colette)
- Original Song – Independent Film – "Requiem For a Private War" (A Private War). Written and performed by Annie Lennox
- Original Score – Short Film – Nami Melumad (Passage)
- Original Score – Video Game – Jeff Broadbent and Tina Guo (Extinction)
- Original Song – Video Game – "Only We Few Remember it Now" (The Banner Saga 3). Written by Austin Wintory. Featuring Faroese singer Eivør
- Song/Score – Trailer – Pawel Gorniak (Crossfire 2)
- Original Score – Short Film (Foreign Language) – Jessica Yap (Sigek Cokelat – A Chocolate Bar)
- Original Song/Score – Mobile Video Game – Matthew Carl Earl (Arena of Valor: Flip the World)
- Original Song/Score – Commercial Advertisement – Juliet Roberts (NBA Finals – Finally Mine)
- Original Score – Independent Film (Foreign Language) – Joan Vilà (Quien Eres)
- Independent Music Video – Alex Boyé (Bend Not Break)
- Original Song – TV Show/Mini Series – The Innocents (The Innocents). Music and lyrics by Carly Paradis. Performed by EERA (Anna Lena Bruland)
- Live Concert for Visual Media – Landmarks Live in Concert – Foo Fighters, Live from the Acropolis
- Main Title – TV Show (Foreign Language) – Layal Watfeh (Ten Sins)
- Original Score – Short Film (Animated) – Mariano Saulino (Very Loving Caterpillar)

=== 2019 ===
- Original Score – Feature Film (Tie!) – Hildur Guðnadóttir (JOKER), Marco Beltrami | Buck Sanders (FORD V FERRARI)
- Original Score – Sci/Fi Fantasy Film – Alan Silvestri (AVENGERS: ENDGAME)
- Original Score – Horror Film – Michael Abels (US)
- Original Score – Animated Film – John Powell (HOW TO TRAIN YOUR DRAGON: THE HIDDEN WORLD)
- Original Score – Documentary – Jeff Beal (THE BIGGEST LITTLE FARM)
- Original Song – Feature Film – “Stand Up” from HARRIET
- Original Song – Documentary – "Sun, Flood, or Drought" From THE BIGGEST LITTLE FARM
- Original Song – Animated Film – "Beautiful Life" from ABOMINABLE
- Music Documentary/Special Program – ECHO IN THE CANYON
- Original Score – TV Show/Limited Series – Kris Bowers (WHEN THEY SEE US)
- Main Title Theme – TV Show/Limited Series – Steven Price (OUR PLANET)
- Outstanding Music Supervision – Film – Mary Ramos (ONCE UPON A TIME...IN HOLLYWOOD)
- Outstanding Music Supervision – TV – Catherine Grieves & David Holmes (KILLING EVE)
- Outstanding Music Supervision – Video Game – Keith Leary, Peter Scaturro and Alex Hackford (DAYS GONE)
- Soundtrack Album – RED DEAD REDEMPTION 2 - VA OST
- Original Score – Independent Film – Dara Taylor (COLEWELL)
- Original Song – Independent Film – Lionel Cohen & Ollie Gabriel - "She's Setting Fire to the Floor" from MOB TOWN
- Original Score – Short Film – J. M. Quintana Cámara – PAPER BOATS
- Original Score – Short Film (Animated) – Amie Doherty (MAROONED)
- Original Score – Video Game – Sarah Schachner (CALL OF DUTY: MODERN WARFARE)
- Original Song – Video Game – "Saudade" (feat. Shim) (RESIDENT EVIL 2)
- Song/Score – Trailer – Mark Hannah – ROMA (Official Trailer)
- Original Score – Short Film (Foreign Language) – Jesica Yap (HOME)
- Original Song/Score – Mobile Video Game – Inon Zur (THE ELDER SCROLLS: BLADES)
- Original Song/Score – Commercial Advertisement – "Main Attraction" (JEEP GRAND CHEROKEE)
- Independent Music Video – Ndlovu Youth Choir & Wouter Kellerman
- Adult Contemporary/AAA – Marina V & Dan Navarro
- Alternative – AMbassadors of Morning
- Americana/Folk/Acoustic – Charlie Millikin
- Blues – Bushmaster featuring Gary Brown
- Children's Music – Kendra K
- Christian/Gospel – Kitt Wakeley
- Contemporary Classical – Sandrine Rudaz
- Country – Charly Reynolds
- Dance – Art Tawanghar
- Downbeat/Downtempo – Polar RundFunk
- EDM (Electronic Dance Music) – NIK:11 & VODZILLA
- Holiday – Rehya Stevens
- Instrumental – AM Dandy
- Jazz – David Longoria & Barbara Morrison
- Latin (Pop/Rock/Urban) – Dian Rene
- Latin (Traditional) – Mariachi Divas de Cindy Shea
- Lyrics/Lyricist – Alexa Ray
- Message Song/Social Impact – J.ournal featuring the Rogue Pianist
- New Age/Ambient – Juliet Lyons
- Pop – Olivia Rox
- Producer/Production – Xandy Barry & Fakelife
- R&B/Soul – Shawn Stockman
- Rap/Hip Hop – FKM ft. J.O.K.E.S.
- Reggae – Analea Brown
- Rock – Joshua & The Holy Rollers
- Singer-Songwriter – J Edna Mae
- Vocal (Female) – Shelita
- Vocal (Male) – Logan Henderson
- World – Angham
