= Alisha Gaddis =

- Occupations: singer, actress, musician, producer, director, writer
- Instrument: vocals
- Label: Rainy Day Dimes
- Member of: Lucky Diaz and the Family Jam Band
- Website: http://www.alishagaddis.com

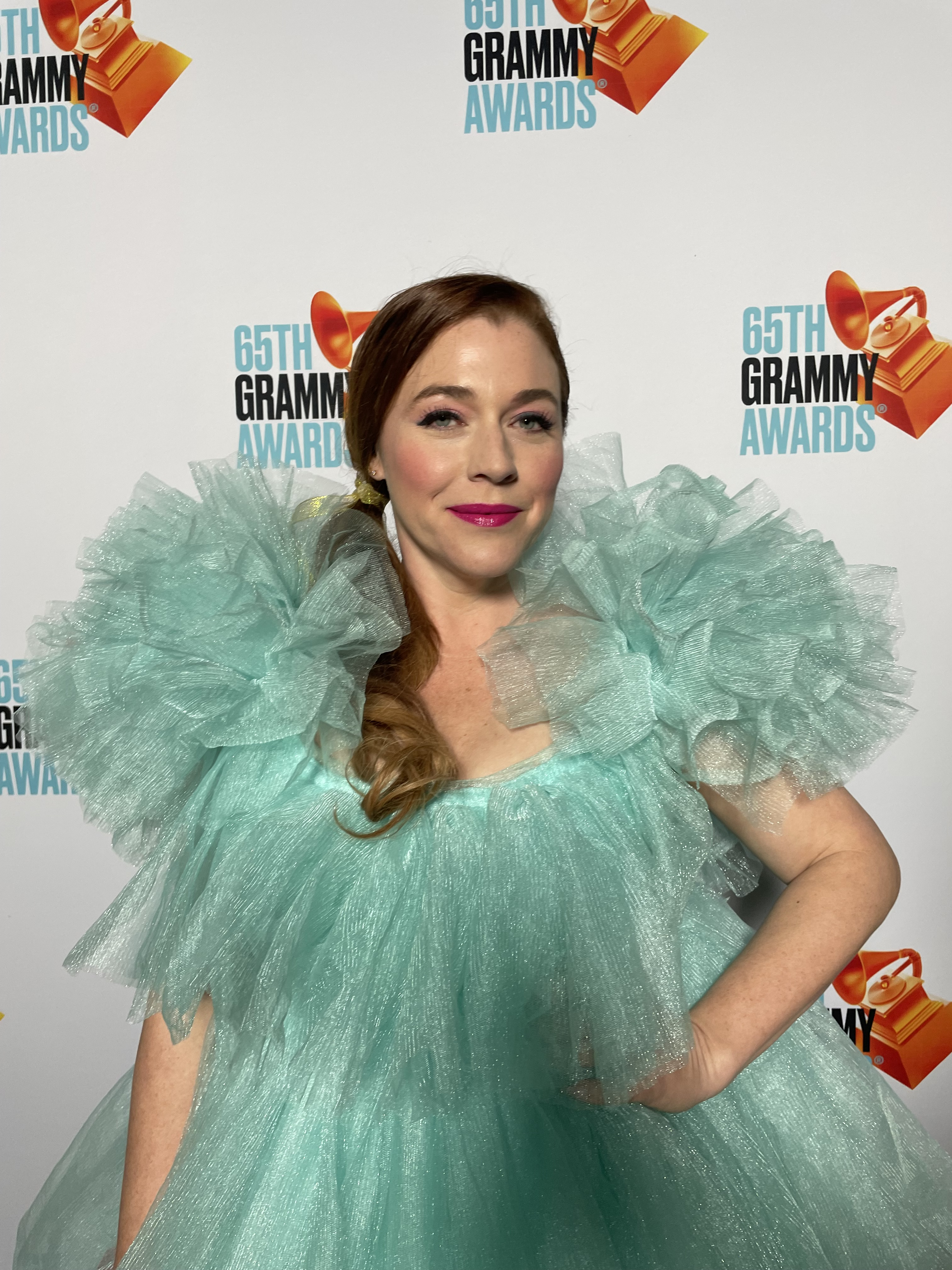
Gaddis in 2023

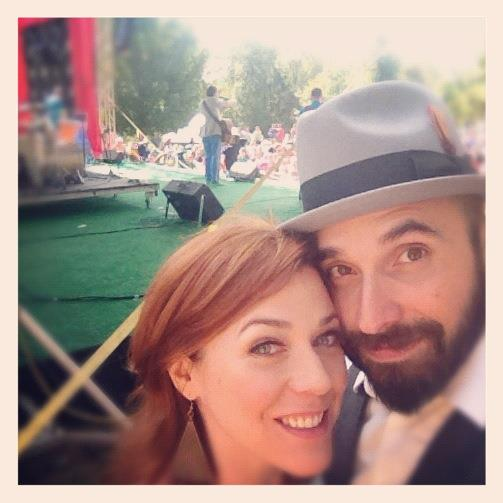
Gaddis and Diaz, 2012

Alisha Gaddis is an American recording artist, actress, producer, director and writer. She is a founding member of Lucky Diaz and The Family Jam Band with her husband Lucky Diaz, and is known for her role as Lishy Lou on the PBS show Lishy Lou and Lucky Too. Gaddis won an Emmy Award in 2015 for Best Performer.

== Biography ==
A native of Evansville, Indiana, Gaddis is a graduate of NYU Tisch School of the Arts.

As a member of Lucky Diaz and the Family Jam Band, Gaddis won a 2013 Latin GRAMMY Award for Best Latin Children's Album for ¡Fantastico!. The album Adelante was a 16th Annual Latin Grammy Awards nominee. The band was the recipient of the Parent's Choice Gold Award from the Parent's Choice Foundation which rewards excellence in children's entertainment, for Oh Lucky Day (2011).

Gaddis won an Emmy Award in 2015 for Best Performer, as part of their bilingual children's TV show Lishy Lou and Lucky Too as part of Friday Zone on PBS. In 2019, the band won their second Latin Grammy Award for the album Buenos Diaz under the name The Lucky Band. The album Paseo Lunar was nominated for a 2020 Latin Grammy Award in the Children's category making it the fourth nomination for The Lucky Band.

The albums Crayon Kids (2021) and Los Fabulosos (2022) were nominated in the Best Children's Album category for the 64th Grammy Awards and 65th Grammy Awards respectively. Gaddis was inducted into the EVSC Hall of Fame as part of the class of 2022. The album Brillo, Brillo! won the 67th Grammy Award in the Best Children's Music Album category on February 2nd, 2025.

=== Acting ===
She starred in Pandemic Playhouse, lending her voice to many puppets, including "Facty".

=== Books ===
Gaddis has released books She Loves Me All The Same (2019), Mama's Milk and Me: A Journal for Nursing Mothers (Breastfeeding, Childcare, Motherhood, Weaning) (2020), Your House Keys Are in the Dryer: A Parenting Haiku Book (2022), Periods, Period. (2023) on Post Hill Press Also a book series on Heuer Publishing including titles, Kids' Comedic Monologues That Are Actually Funny, LGBTQ Comedic Monologues That Are Actually Funny, Men's Comedic Monologues That Are Actually Funny, Teen Boys' Comedic Monologues That Are Actually Funny, Teen Girls' Comedic Monologues That Are Actually Funny, Women's Comedic Monologues That Are Actually Funny.

== Discography ==
Albums with Lucky Diaz and The Family Jam Band as vocalist and producer.

- Luckiest Adventure (April 2010) CD Only
- Oh Lucky Day (April 2011)
- A Potluck (May 2012)
- ¡Fantastico! (May 2013) - Best Latin Children's Album GRAMMY Winner, 2013
- Lishy Lou and Lucky Too (October 2013)
- Aquí, Allá (May 2014)
- Adelante (May 2015) - Best Latin Children's Album GRAMMY Nominee, 2015
- Greatest Hits Vol 1 (July 2016)
- Made in LA (July 2017)
- Hold Tight, Shine Bright (August 2018)
- Buenos Diaz (April 2019)
- Paseo Lunar (May 2020)
- Crayon Kids (June 2021)
- Los Fabulosos (April 2022)
- Brillo, Brillo! (May 2024)

== Personal life ==
Gaddis met her husband Lucky Diaz at The Comedy Store in Los Angeles, California. They married in 2012 and are raising two children together.
