= Barbara Morrison =

American jazz singer (1949–2022)

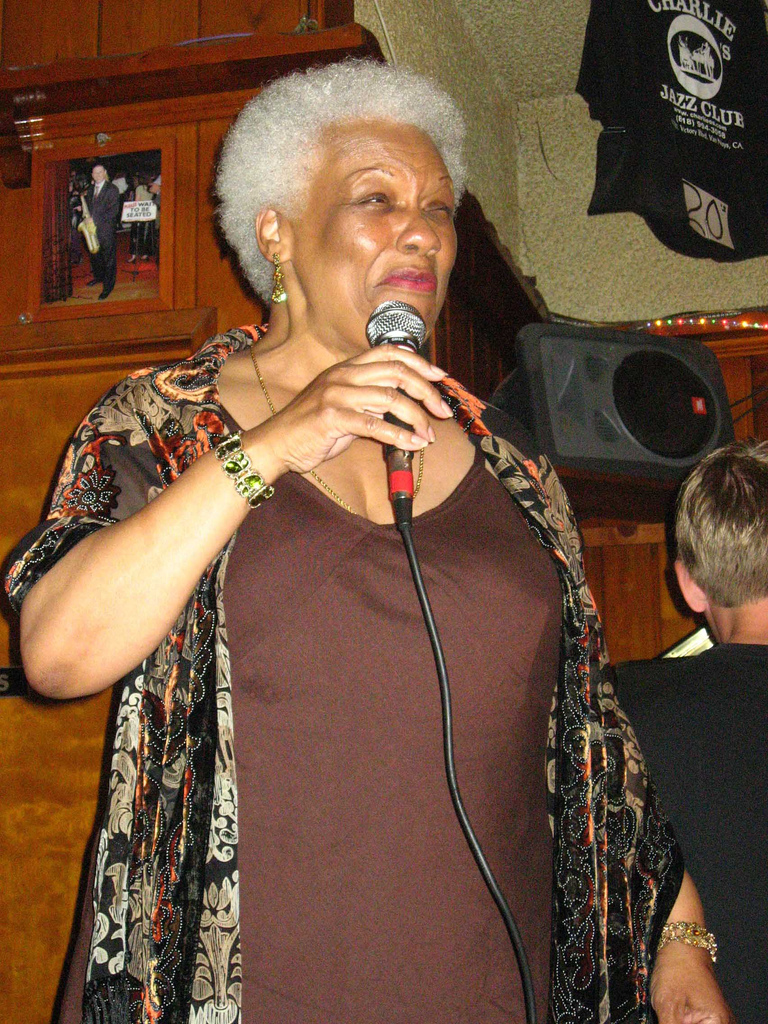

Background information
- Born: September 10, 1949; Ypsilanti, Michigan, U.S.
- Died: March 16, 2022 (aged 72); Los Angeles, California, U.S.
- Genres: Jazz, blues
- Occupation: Vocalist
- Website: www.sfcv.org/articles/artist-spotlight/jazz-legend-barbara-morrison-just-getting-started

Barbara Morrison (September 10, 1949 – March 16, 2022) was an American jazz singer.

== Biography ==
Born in Ypsilanti, Michigan, on September 10, 1949, and raised in Romulus, Michigan, Barbara Morrison recorded her first appearance for radio in Detroit at the age of 10. In 1973 when she was 23, she moved to Los Angeles and sang with Eddie "Cleanhead" Vinson's band. Between the mid-1970s and early 1990s, she recorded several albums with Johnny Otis.

In 1986, Morrison toured with the Philip Morris Superband, completing a 14-city one-month tour of Canada, Australia, Japan, and the Philippines, playing with jazz organist Jimmy Smith and backed by saxophonist James Moody, guitarist Kenny Burrell, trumpeter Jon Faddis and Grady Tate on drums. Morrison also completed a 33-city tour in the US in an all-star tribute to composer Harold Arlen. In 1995, Morrison appeared in a televised tribute to Ella Fitzgerald with Mel Tormé, Diane Reeves, Stevie Wonder, Chaka Khan, Tony Bennett, Dionne Warwick and Lou Rawls.

Morrison worked with Gerald Wilson, Dizzy Gillespie, Ray Charles, Ron Carter, Etta James, Esther Phillips, David T. Walker, Dr. John, Kenny Burrell, Terence Blanchard, Joe Sample, Cedar Walton, Nancy Wilson, Joe Williams, Tony Bennett, Keb' Mo, Count Basie Orchestra, Clayton-Hamilton Orchestra and Doc Severinsen. She performed at the Montreux Jazz Festival, Nice, Pori, Carnegie Hall, North Sea, Darling Harbour, Sydney Opera House, Monterey, Long Beach, and in tributes to Dizzy Gillespie and Benny Golson. In 2011, Morrison began performing with Jack Hale, a guitarist, arranger and bandleader.

She was an adjunct associate professor of global jazz studies at UCLA.

In early March 2022, Morrison was hospitalized for cardiovascular disease. She died on March 16, 2022, at the age of 72.

== Discography ==
=== As leader ===
- Love Is a Four-Letter Word (with the Leslie Drayton Orchestra) (Esoteric/Optimism, 1984)
- Love'n You (with Joe Sample, David T. Walker, Wilton Felder) (P.C.H./Pony Canyon, 1990)
- Doing All Right (Aris/Mons, 1992 [1995])
- Blues for Ella: Live (with the Thilo Berg Big Band) (Mons, 1993 [1995])
- I Know How to Do It (Blue Lady, 1996; Chartmaker, 1997)
- I'm Gettin' 'Long All Right (Chartmaker, 1997)
- Visit Me (Chartmaker, 1999)
- Ooh-Shoobie-Doo! (with Johnny Otis & his band) (J & T, 2000)
- Live Down Under (Blue Lady, 2000)
- Thinking of You, Joe (Blue Lady, 2002) - note: this is Morrison's special tribute to the great jazz vocalist, Joe Williams.
- Live at the 9:20 Special (with Danny Caron, Ruth Davies, Charles McNeal, John Haynes, Steve Campos, John R. Burr) (Springboard Productions, 2002)
- Barbara Morrison (Arietta Discs, 2003)
- Live at the Dakota (with Junior Mance, Earl May, Jackie Williams, Houston Person) (Dakota Live, 2005) - Note: includes Morrison's signature song, "They Call Me Sundown".
- Double Standards (Blue Lady, 2006) - 2-CD set
- Los Angeles, Los Angeles, The City by the Sea (CD single; two songs) (Garrison, 2008)
- By Request: Volume One (Fertility, 2011)
- By Request: Volume Two (Fertility, 2011)
- A Sunday Kind of Love (featuring Houston Person) (Savant, 2013)
- I Love You, Yes I Do (featuring Houston Person) (Savant, 2014)
- The L.A. Treasures Project: Live at Alvas Showroom (with the Clayton-Hamilton Jazz Orchestra) (Capri, 2014)
- I Wanna Be Loved (featuring Houston Person) (Savant, 2017)
- Warm & Cozy (featuring Stuart Elster) (Barbara Morrison Productions, 2021)

=== As sidewoman ===
- MOOD – David Longoria (Del Oro, 2019) – guest artist on "Body and Soul"
- Back To Jazz With Johnny Otis & His Orchestra And Introducing Barbara Morrison (Jazz World, 1977)
- Johnny Otis! Johnny Otis! The 1984 Johnny Otis Show (Hawk Sound, 1984) – Morrison sings on "Stand By Me", "Do It Again, Baby" and "Soothe Me, Baby".
- Otisology - Johnny Otis Show (Kent, 1986) – Morrison sings on 'Roll With Me Henry", "Let's Go, Johnny" and "I'm Scared Of You".
- Prime Time - Jimmy Smith (Milestone, 1989) – Morrison is featured on "Farther On Up The Road".
- Al Aarons And The L.A. Jazz Caravan - Al Aarons (Los Angeles Jazz Society/LAJS, 1995) – Morrison sings on "Back Door Blues" and "Make The Man Love Me".
- Swingin' The Blues - Doc Severinsen & His Big Band (Azica, 1999) – Morrison sings on "Every Day I Have the Blues", "Don't Touch Me" and "The Hucklebuck".
- Big Wide Grin - Keb' Mo' (Sony Wonder/OKeh, 2001) – Morrison sings a duet with Keb' Mo' on "Grandma's Hands".
- From Me To You: A Tribute To Lionel Hampton - Terry Gibbs (Mack Avenue, 2003) – Morrison is featured on "Evil Gal Blues".
- Sweet Jimmie Sings The Blues - Sweet Jimmie (Brown Door Records/BDR, 2003) – Morrison is featured on "Don't Touch Me".
- How Sweet It Is - Danny Caron (Caron Music, 2008) – Morrison sings on "The Promised Land" and "I Need Your Love So Bad".
- Home Cookin' - Henry Franklin (Skipper Productions, 2009) – Morrison is featured on "Philanthropy".
- Never Been Blue - Johnny Boyd (Cliffdive Records, 2010) – Morrison sings a duet with Boyd on "Rockin' Good Way".
- Sweet Spot - Mark Winkler (Cafe Pacific, 2011) – Morrison sings a duet with Winkler on the title track.
- Live In Compton - Chris Miller Band (CMME Productions, 2011) [6-song EP] – Morrison is featured on "Down Home Blues".
- Take Your Time - Bernie Pearl (Bee Bump Music, 2013) – Morrison sings three duets with Pearl.
- The Road To Love - Kenny Burrell (HighNote, 2015) – Morrison sings on "The Road To Love", "Crazy He Calls Me" and "Things Ain't What They Used To Be".
- Unlimited 1: Live At Catalina's - Kenny Burrell (HighNote, 2016) – Morrison is again featured on "Things Ain't What They Used To Be".

== Legacy ==
The intersection of 43rd Street and Degnan Boulevard in Leimert Park, Los Angeles, was dedicated as Barbara Morrison Square on the anniversary of her birth, September 10. 2022. She had opened the Barbara Morrison Performing Arts Center here as a launching pad for new artists.
