= Far East Deep South =

2020 American documentary film

- Directed by: Larissa Lam
- Written by: Larissa Lam
- Produced by: Baldwin Chiu; Larissa Lam
- Starring: Baldwin Chiu; Edwin Chiu; Larissa Lam; Judy Chu; Gordon H. Chang
- Cinematography: Coop Cooper; Jason Poon
- Edited by: Dwight Buhler
- Music by: Nathan Wang
- Production company: Giant Flashlight Media
- Release date: 6 March 2020 (Cinequest)
- Running time: 76 minutes
- Country: United States
- Language: English

Far East Deep South is a 2020 American documentary film about a Chinese American family's journey to search for their family roots. Instead of leading them to the Far East to a remote village in China, it took them to the deep south into the small town of Cleveland in the Mississippi Delta.

Far East Deep South had its world premiere at the Cinequest Film & Creativity Festival on March 6, 2020, winning the audience award for best documentary just as the COVID-19 pandemic shut down theaters forcing the film to go virtual the rest of 2020 and into 2021.

== Plot ==
Baldwin Chiu and brother, Edwin, begin with the assumption that they are first generation Chinese Americans living in San Francisco. However, they find out their Chinese grandfather is buried in Mississippi. This new information leads the Chiu family on a voyage of discovery that will change forever the family they thought they knew. Their journey begins with one question. How did Chinese people end up in segregated Mississippi in the latter part of the 19th century? Looming large in the documentary is the Chinese Exclusion Act of 1882, which directly impacted Chiu's family. Chiu's grandfather and great-grandfather served a predominately Black clientele and the documentary visits with Chinese American families who remained and some Black families who remember the store. Their stories of friendship and alliances contrast the Asian-Black conflicts of the 1992 Los Angeles riots.

== Selected cast ==
- Larissa Lam, Director/co-producer, Writer
- Baldwin Chiu, aka Only Won, Producer
- Judy Chu
- Gordon H. Chang

== Release ==
The TV broadcast premiere of Far East Deep South was on May 4, 2021 on PBS via World Channel's program America ReFramed. The film is available for digital streaming on Tubi.

== Accolades ==
- 2022: Telly Award - History category TV Documentary
- 2021: Best Documentary Grand Jury, Seattle Asian American Film Festival.
- 2021: Best Documentary Award, Coronado Island Film Festival
- 2020: Audience Award, Cinequest Film & Creativity Festival.
- 2020: Best Mississippi Feature, Oxford Film Festival.
- 2020: Audience Award Best Documentary, CAAMFest
- 2020: Audience Award Best Documentary, Philadelphia Asian Film Festival, Philadelphia Asian American Film Festival
- 2020: Best Feature, Women's Texas Film Festival.
- 2021: Mary Pickford Award, Coronado Island Film Festival
- 2021: "Best of 2021" - PBS and Video Librarian.

== See also ==
- Chinese Americans in the Mississippi Delta
