= We Are One =

We Are One may refer to:

== Music ==
=== Albums ===
- We Are One (Maze album) (1983) or its title song
- We Are One (Pieces of a Dream album) (1982)
- We Are One, a 2007 album by Kelly Sweet or its title song

=== Songs ===
- "We Are One" (global collaboration song) (2020)
- "We Are One" (Hardwell and Jolin Tsai song) (2017)
- "We Are One" (Kiss song) (1998)
- "We Are One (Ole Ola)", a 2014 song by Pitbull
- "We Are One" (Simba's Pride), a song from the 1998 film The Lion King II: Simba's Pride
- "We Are One" (Sofia Tarasova song) (2013)
- "We Are One", a 2014 song by Jena Irene Asciutto performed on American Idol
- "We Are One", a 2005 song by Buckethead from Enter the Chicken
- "We Are One", a 2013 song by Daiki Kasho featured in Gran Turismo 6
- "We Are One", a 2013 song by Krewella from Get Wet
- "We Are One", a 1992 song by the Offspring from Ignition
- "We Are One", a 2010 song by 12 Stones from The Only Easy Day Was Yesterday
- "We Are One", a 2011 single by Verbal and Kylie Minogue
- "We Are One", a 1999 song by Westlife from Westlife
- "We Are One", the theme of the Eurovision Song Contest 2013

== Other uses ==
- We Are One: The Obama Inaugural Celebration at the Lincoln Memorial
- We Are One (film), a 2020 documentary film
- "We are one", a motto on the U.S. Continental dollar coin of 1776 and the Fugio cent of 1787

== See also ==
- Hum Ek Hain (disambiguation)
- "Together We Are One", a song by Delta Goodrem
- We Too Are One, an album by Eurythmics
