= Robert Eibach =

American producer & DJ

- Born: Scranton, Pennsylvania, United States
- Genres: EDM, dance, pop, alternative
- Occupations: Producer, remixer, dj, songwriter
- Years active: 2006-present
- Labels: RCA Records, Republic Records, Interscope, Cash Money Records, Warner Bros. Records, Del Oro Music, Asylum, LOG Records
- Website: www.roberteibach.com

Robert Eibach is an American Grammy Award winning and Latin Grammy nominated artist, producer, recording engineer, songwriter, DJ and remixer. Eibach's credits include Ariana Grande, Taylor Swift, Camila Cabello, Jennifer Lopez, Mark Ronson, Kesha, Normani, Sabrina Carpenter, Alan Walker and others. Eibach was nominated for three Grammy Awards and a Latin Grammy Award with Lucky Diaz and The Family Jam Band and won the Best Children's Album Grammy Award as a band member for the album Brillo, Brillo! at the 67th Grammy Awards.

== Early life ==
Robert Eibach was born July 6 in Scranton, Pennsylvania, and attended college at Temple University in Philadelphia, Pennsylvania. While in college, Eibach began recording and remixing songs. He moved to Los Angeles, CA after graduating school.

== Career ==
In 2018, Robert Eibach remixed Ariana Grande's No Tears Left To Cry, which went to number one on the Billboard Dance Club Songs Chart. His remix for Mark Ronson and Camila Cabello's song Find U Again also went to number one on the Billboard Dance Club Songs Chart, October 19th, 2019, making this the fourth time for Ronson and Cabello's first.

Eibach joined The Lucky Band as a musician and producer for their 2020 release Paseo Lunar, which was nominated for a Latin Grammy Award in the Children's category.

Robert Eibach earned his first Grammy nomination as a member of Lucky Diaz and The Family Jam Band for their release Crayon Kids in the Best Children's Album category at the 64th Grammy Awards. The album Los Fabulosos by Lucky Diaz and The Family Jam Band was also nominated for a 65th Grammy Award in the Children's Category, which featured Eibach's remix of Mi Gusta, as well as his contributions as a musician and engineer. On February 2, 2025, Lucky Diaz and The Family Jam Band won the 67th Grammy Award in the Best Children's Music Album category for their album Brillo, Brillo!, which Eibach is a band member, engineer and producer.

Eibach's first single as the main recording artist, Play With You, was released on August 21, 2020. The song features Elle Dubleu on lead vocals, and is nominated for a 2020 Hollywood Music In Media Award in the EDM Category for September. He released his first full-length album Immediate Gratifying Behaviors on June 30th, 2023. He produced, wrote and performed all of the songs.

== Awards and nominations ==
Year	Award	Category	Result
2016	Hollywood Music In Media Award	Best Americana/Folk/Acoustic (Sunshine Stills, Twist of Fate)	Win
2016	Hollywood Music In Media Award	Best EDM Song (David Longoria, Angels)	Win
2020	Latin Grammy Award	Best Children's Album (The Lucky Band, Paseo Lunar)	Nomination
2020	Hollywood Music In Media Award	Best EDM Song (Robert Eibach ft Elle Dubleu, Play With You)	Nomination
2022	Grammy Award	Best Children's Album (Lucky Diaz and The Family Jam Band, Crayon Kids)	Nomination
2023	Grammy Award	Best Children's Album (Lucky Diaz and The Family Jam Band, Los Fabulosos)	Nomination
2025	Grammy Award	Best Children's Album (Lucky Diaz and The Family Jam Band, Brillo, Brillo!)	Win

== Discography ==
Artist	Album or Single	Year	Role
Michael J Downey	Bridge of No Return	2006	Engineer
Michael J Downey	America	2007	Producer, engineer
Lakotah	Falling (Single)	2011	Producer, Songwriter
Ricky Kej and Wouter Kellerman	Winds of Samsara	2014	Engineer
Wouter Kellerman	Love Language	2015	Engineer
Larissa Lam	Love and Discovery	2015	Co-Producer, Remixer, Engineer
Lucky Diaz and The Family Jam Band	Adelante	2015	Engineer
Karine Hannah	Victory (Single)	2016	Remixer
Sunshine Stills	Twist of Fate	2016	Producer, engineer, Band Member
David Longoria	The Journey	2016	Songwriter, Producer
David Longoria	Angels (Single)	2016	Songwriter, Producer, Remixer
Lisa Cole	Lost Love (Single)	2017	Remixer
Tami	The Sugar Shack (Single)	2017	Remixer
David Longoria	El Viaje	2017	Songwriter, Producer
Smash Mouth	Walkin' On The Sun' (Re-issue Single)	2017	Remixer
Lucky Diaz and The Family Jam Band	Made In LA	2017	Engineer
Selena Gomez X Marshmello	Wolves (Single)	2017	Remixer
April Diamond	Lose Control (Single)	2017	Remixer
Jena Rose	Reasons (Single)	2018	Remixer
Marshmello (ft Anne-Marie)	Friends (Single)	2018	Remixer
Ariana Grande	No Tears Left To Cry (Single)	2018	Remixer
Ani	Dance The Night Away (Single)	2018	Producer, Songwriter, Remix
David Guetta & Sia	Flames (Single)	2018	Remixer
Ariana Grande	God Is A Woman	2018	Remixer
Christina Aguilera (ft. Ty Dolla $ign & 2 Chainz)	Accelerate (Single)	2018	Remixer
David Longoria (ft. Dallas Lovato)	Playground (Single)	2018	Producer, Songwriter, Remix
Ariana Grande	Breathin' (Single)	2018	Remixer
Ariana Grande	Thank U, Next (Single)	2018	Remixer
Ariana Grande	7 Rings (Single)	2019	Remixer
The Lucky Band	Buenos Diaz	2019	Remixer
Ariana Grande	Break Up With Your Girlfriend, I'm Bored (Single)	2019	Remixer
Alan Walker (ft. Sabrina Carpenter & Farruko)	On My Way (Single)	2019	Remixer
Taylor Swift (ft. Brendon Urie)	Me! (Single)	2019	Remixer
Ani	Confession (Single)	2019	Producer, Songwriter, Remix
Laura Angelini	Share That Love/What The World Needs Now Is Love (Single)	2019	Remixer
Mark Ronson (ft. Camila Cabello)	Find U Again (Single)	2019	Remixer
Ashley O (aka Miley Cyrus)	On A Roll (Single)	2019	Remixer
Normani	Motivation (Single)	2019	Remixer
Kesha (ft. Big Freeda)	Raising Hell (Single)	2020	Remixer
Jennifer Lopez	Baila Conmigo (Single)	2020	Remixer
The Lucky Band	Paseo Lunar	2020	Musician, Producer
Robert Eibach (ft. Elle Dubleu)	Play With You (Single)	2020	Artist, Producer, Songwriter
Lucky Diaz and The Family Jam Band	Crayon Kids	2021	Band Member, Engineer, Remixer
Robert Eibach (ft. Elle Dubleu)	Good Love (Single)	2021	Artist, Producer, Songwriter
Lucky Diaz and The Family Jam Band	Los Fabulosos	2022	Band Member, Engineer, Remixer
Robert Eibach X Kim Azulay	Better This Time (Single)	2022	Artist, Producer, Songwriter
Robert Eibach	Immediate Gratifying Behaviors	2023	Artist, Producer, Songwriter
Robert Eibach, Carla Ester, David Longoria	Dios mio (Single)	2023	Artist, Producer, Songwriter
Ariana Grande	yes, and? (Single)	2024	Remixer
Ariana Grande	we can't be friends (wait for your love) (Single)	2024	Remixer
Lucky Diaz and The Family Jam Band	Brillo, Brillo!	2024	Band Member, Engineer
Ariana Grande	the boy is mine (Single)	2024	Remixer
Ariana Grande	twilight zone (Single)	2025	Remixer
