= 168 Film Project =

- Location: Fayetteville, Georgia
- Founded: 2003
- Directors: John David Ware
- Website: 168film.com

The 168 Film Project is a Christian film festival. Worldwide, over 1500 short films have been produced for the competition since 2003.

168 is a 501(c)(3) nonprofit corporation.

== History ==
The 168 Film Project (sometimes styled 168 Hour Film Project) was launched in 2003 by filmmaker and producer John David Ware in Burbank, California. Its inaugural edition screened thirteen shorts created in the single-week production challenge. By its seventh edition in 2009 the festival had adopted the annual theme “Family Business,” and organisers reported a growing slate of eleven-minute shorts drawn from randomly assigned Bible verses.

The eighth edition in 2010 drew more than sixty-five submissions from sixteen U.S. states and five continents. Ware, described as having “worked with filmmakers worldwide,” estimated that over 300 films had already been produced through the initiative.

At the ninth festival in 2011, themed “Second Chances,” ninety shorts competed for twenty-one awards and more than US$15,000 in cash prizes. That year the short Useless won the top prize.

By 2014, organisers estimated that alumni had produced more than 800 shorts, with some screening at other international festivals and some advancing into feature-length development.

In November 2022 the festival relocated to Fayetteville, Georgia, first staging its twentieth edition at Trilith Studios’s Town Stage. The festival would change location to New City Church in Fairburn, Georgia in 2024, and then Harp's Crossing Church in Fayetteville since 2025.

Hollywood participants include Zachary Levi (Shazam!, Shazam! Fury of the Gods, American Underdog); Candace Cameron Bure (Full House); Academy Award winner Louis Gossett Jr.; four-time Emmy Award winner Michael Learned (The Waltons); Max Gail (Barney Miller); actor and director Corbin Bernsen (Major League I & II, Psych); actor and director Kevin Sorbo (Let There Be Light, Hercules: The Legendary Journeys); T. C. Stallings (War Room, Unbridled); producer Howard Kazanjian (Raiders of the Lost Ark, Star Wars: Episode VI – Return of the Jedi, Star Wars: Episode V – The Empire Strikes Back); producer Ralph Winter (X-Men, Fantastic Four, Star Trek); and co-creator David McFadzean (Home Improvement).

Past 168 sponsors include Sony BMG, Sony Pictures, Canon, Arri, Sony BPC, Sony Affirm, Panasonic, Kino Flo, Roland, Panavision, Regent University, Biola University, Church Production and Worship Technology Magazines.

== Format ==
Participants receive a randomly selected Bible verse and have ten days of pre-production to develop a screenplay, cast actors and secure locations. Principal photography and post-production must then be completed within exactly 168 hours (seven days), and the finished film may not exceed eleven minutes. Each annual cycle revolves around a unifying scriptural theme—for example “Atonement,” “Family Business” and “Second Chances”—against which entries are judged for their “scriptural integration.”Competitive categories typically include Best Film, Director, Actor, Cinematography and a student division, with cash awards ranging from US$12,000 to US$20,000.
