= Only Won =

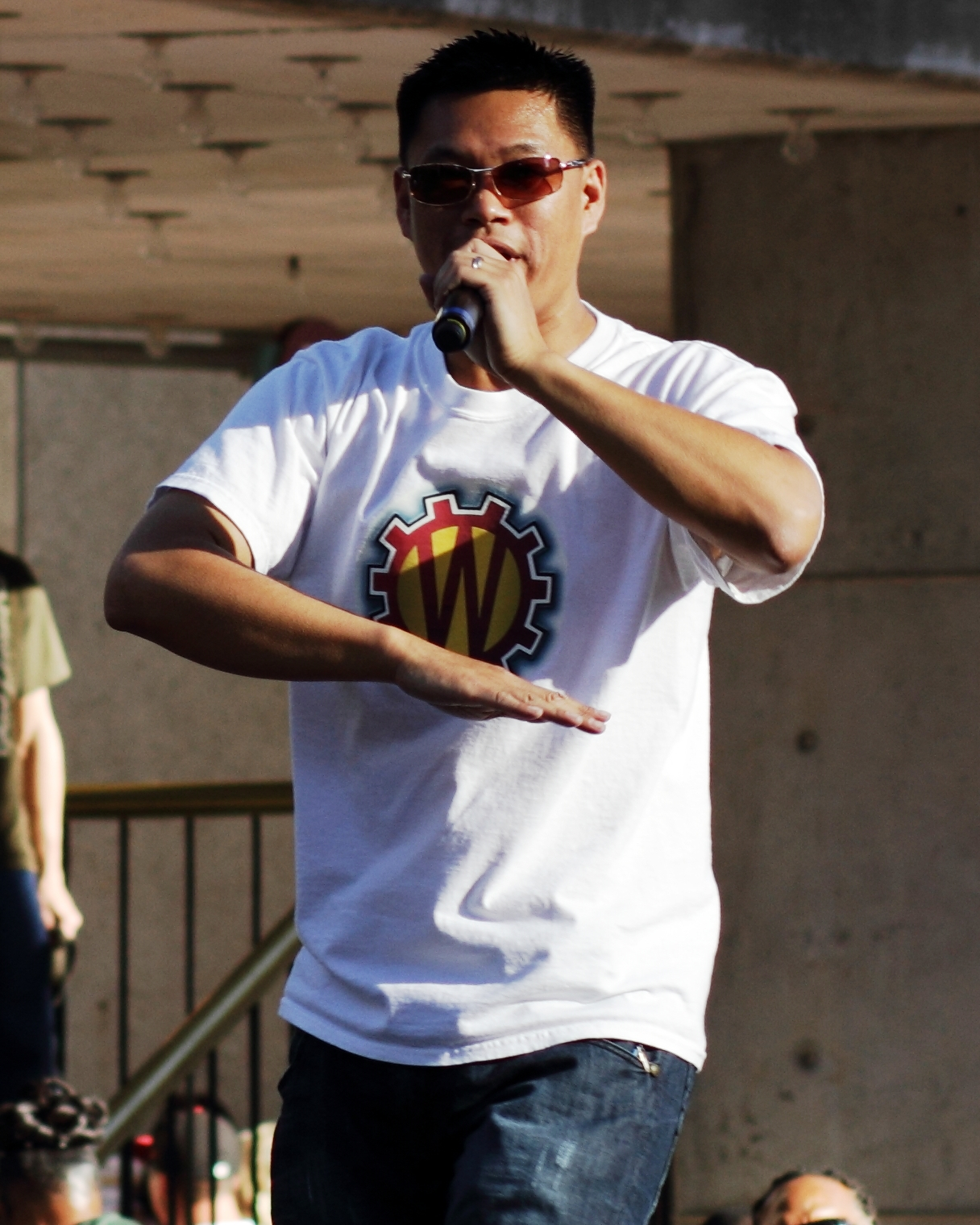
- Only Won at a Sacramento California State Fair concert in 2010.

Background information
- Born: Baldwin Chiu; May 17, 1974 (age 52)
- Genres: Christian hip hop, hip hop
- Occupations: Rapper, actor, stunt performer
- Label: LOG Records

Baldwin Chiu (born May 17, 1974), known professionally as Only Won, is an American rapper, actor, producer and stunt performer. As a hip hop artist, he writes/performs rap, beatboxing, and singing. He is also a member of the Screen Actors Guild involved in acting and choreographing stunt work. Only Won started rapping professionally in 1991 after being influenced by hip hop pioneers Run DMC, Will Smith, dcTalk, and T-Bone. Because he started rapping in both English and Cantonese, some consider him to be the first Chinese American bilingual rapper. At one point, he was labeled the "Christian" version of "Jin the MC".

== Career ==
Only Won is a professionally licensed mechanical engineer with a PE License, earning him the "Lyrical Engineer" nickname. The title track of his LP (The Lyrical Engineer), provides an exposition of the life and livelihood of a professional engineer.

Only Won is also a guest speaker at conventions, schools, and youth events challenging and encouraging the next generation to pursue their dreams and passions while maintaining an education and focus on God.

Signed in 2009 under Los Angeles record label, LOG Records. Only Won has appeared as both a host and musical guest on JCTV and has been featured on collaboration albums. Only Won's release, "The Lyrical Engineer" is produced by Grammy nominated group Dynamic Twins, Billboard winner Maximillian and Larissa Lam. The music video was directed and edited by Emmy Award-winning director, Marlon Jones. Only Won and Larissa Lam launched a viral music video title "Cantonese Boy" which was a parody of the Grammy winning song American Boy by Kanye West and Estelle. After being seen performing "Cantonese Boy" in Chinatown, Only Won was asked to perform at the 2010 Green Globe Film Awards as they honored Asians in film and entertainment.

As an actor and member of SAG, he appears in many feature films such as The Matrix Reloaded and The Matrix Revolutions, xXx2: State of the Union, Twisted, and Pursuit of Happyness. He has also provided music for the soundtrack of Dead Man Down and the animated film, "The Monkey Prince".

He is also an advanced level martial artists having trained under the lineage of Kanbun Uechi and Wong Doc-Fai. He is a 3-time UC Berkeley Wushu Champion in tai chi, weapons, and push hands and teaches Tai Chi in Hollywood. He has used some of his skills in choreographing fight scenes in movies and doing stunt work for Ang Lee in the movie Hulk.

On April 29, 2010, California State University, Sacramento, honored high-achieving alumni at an annual award ceremony called the "Distinguished Service Awards". This is the highest recognized award for CSU Sacramento. Baldwin was recognized for his contributions in engineering, his performances as Only Won: The Lyrical Engineer and other entertainment industry endeavors as well as his work with youth. He received this award alongside KXTV ABC News anchor Cristina Mendonsa.

On Pi Day 2012, Intel asked Only Won to be part of President Barack Obama's national White House campaign titled, Stay With It, designed to boost retention of students in undergraduate engineering programs.

== Only Won releases ==
Cat No.	Artist	Title	Date	Configuration
1	Only Won	First Impressions	1997	EP
2	Channel 3	Channel 3 Anchormen	2001	Single
3	Minister RMB	When the Storm Comes	2006	LP
4	Only Won	Glory EP	2006	EP
5	Hip Hop International	H2i Mix Tape	2009	LP
6	Only Won	The Lyrical Engineer	2010	LP
7	Only Won	Crush em Like Godzilla	2011	Single
8	Only Won	JUN BAY	2012	Single
9	Larissa Lam	Love and Discovery	2015	LP

== Other work ==
Tai Chiu Music was set up in 2008. After moving its location from Sacramento, California, TCM joined forces with LOG Records and producer Larissa Lam in Los Angeles.

In 2011, Only Won released a "Geeked out" remix video of the hit song "Billionaire", titled "I Wanna Be An Engineer", a parody that reached 1.2 million views on YouTube and caught the attention of CNN, Discovery Channel, The Pentagon, and FIRST Robotics Competition. The song "Crush 'em Like Godzilla" was inspired by Ed Wang, the first NFL player of full Chinese descent.

In summer 2012, Only Won released two songs on the video game Sleeping Dogs.

In Spring 2013, the song "JUN BAY" (aka: Get ready) was featured on the film Dead Man Down.

== Reissues on other labels ==
LOG Records issued the 2010 release of Only Won-The Lyrical Engineer tracks for download, through major outlets (Amazon, iTunes, CD Baby, Nimbitmusic, etc.). Also featured with Holland music collaborating with One Truth.

== Filmography ==
Year	Title	Role	Notes
2020	Far East Deep South	Producer	Documentary Feature
2015	Finding Cleveland	Producer	Documentary Short Film
2013	JUN BAY (aka: Get Ready)	Soundtrack	Film: Dead Man Down
2013	DIM SUM	Principle Musical Artist	TV WEB, Film Festival
2012	Sleeping Dogs (video game)	Musical Artist	Video Game - Square Enix
2011	I Wanna Be An Engineer Music Video	Principle Musical Artist	WEB
2010	JCTV Christmas Special	Featured Rap Artist	TV
2010	Lyrical Engineer Music Video	Principle Musical Artist	TV
2009	JCTV Top 3	Musical Guest	TV
2008	Cantonese Boy Music Video	Principle Musical Artist	WEB
2008	JCTV Christmas Special	Beatbox	TV
2006	Pursuit of Happyness	Intern	FILM
2005	xXx2: State of the Union	Navy Officer	FILM
2004	Twisted (2004 film)	CSI Photographer	FILM
2003	Hulk (film)	Swat & FBI	FILM
2002	The Matrix	Zion	FILM

== Film Maker ==
In 2015, Only Won produced a documentary short titled, Finding Cleveland with Larissa Lam as the director and music composer. It garnished multiple nominations for Best Documentary. In 2016, Finding Cleveland won Best Documentary at the Oxford Film Festival. The story started as a journey for him to search for his family roots, but instead of taking him to the far east, it took him into the deep south of Cleveland, MS. While the 12-minute documentary focuses on the family's discoveries about their roots, it also touches on a broader history, such as the treatment of Asian immigrants in the region and the role the Chinese Exclusion Act played in that.

In May 2021, his multi-award-winning film Far East Deep South released on PBS America ReFramed.

== Personal life ==
In March 2008, he married American talk show host, singer-songwriter, director and producer Larissa Lam. The couple currently reside in Los Angeles, California.

== See also ==
- JCTV
