= List of Billboard number-one dance singles of 1998 =

Billboard magazine compiled the top-performing dance singles in the United States during 1998 on two Hot Dance Music charts: the Club Play and the Maxi-Singles Sales. Premiered in 1976, the Club Play chart ranked the most-played singles on dance club based on reports from a national sample of club DJs. The Maxi-Singles Sales chart was launched in 1985 to compile the best-selling dance singles based on retail sales across the United States.

== Charts history ==
Chart history
Issue date	Hot Dance Music/Club Play		Hot Dance Music/Maxi-Singles Sales		Ref.
Issue date	Song	Artist(s)	Song	Artist(s)	Ref.
January 3	"Never Gonna Fall"	Lisa Stansfield	"Roxanne '97 - Puff Daddy Remix"	Sting & The Police	
January 10	"Much Better"	Club 69 featuring Suzanne Palmer	"Roxanne '97 - Puff Daddy Remix"	Sting & The Police	
January 17	"Perfect Love"	House of Prince featuring Oezlem	"Together Again"	Janet	
January 24	"Circles"	Kimara Lovelace	"Dangerous"	Busta Rhymes	
January 31	"Kiss You All Over"	No Mercy	"Dangerous"	Busta Rhymes	
February 7	"Together Again"	Janet	"Gone Till November"	Wyclef Jean	
February 14	"Elements"	Danny Tenaglia	"Deja Vu (Uptown Baby)"	Lord Tariq & Peter Gunz	
February 21	"Elements"	Danny Tenaglia	"How Do I Live"	Leann Rimes	
February 28	"You Only Have to Say You Love Me"	Hannah Jones	"Get At Me Dog"	DMX (Featuring Sheek of The Lox)	
March 7	"Off the Hook"	Jody Watley	"Get At Me Dog"	DMX (Featuring Sheek of The Lox)	
March 14	"You Make Me Feel (Mighty Real)"	Byron Stingily	"Get At Me Dog"	DMX (Featuring Sheek of The Lox)	
March 21	"Stay"	Sash! featuring La Trec	"Get At Me Dog"	DMX (Featuring Sheek of The Lox)	
March 28	"Remember"	BT	"Get At Me Dog"	DMX (Featuring Sheek of The Lox)	
April 4	"It's Over Love"	Todd Terry featuring Shannon	"Get At Me Dog"	DMX (Featuring Sheek of The Lox)	
April 11	"I'm Leavin'"	Lisa Stansfield	"Get At Me Dog"	DMX (Featuring Sheek of The Lox)	
April 18	"Fun"	Da Mob featuring Jocelyn Brown	"Get At Me Dog"	DMX (Featuring Sheek of The Lox)	
April 25	"Frozen"	Madonna	"Get At Me Dog"	DMX (Featuring Sheek of The Lox)	
May 2	"Frozen"	Madonna	"Get At Me Dog"	DMX (Featuring Sheek of The Lox)	
May 9	"Found a Cure"	Ultra Naté	"My All" / "Fly Away (Butterfly Reprise)"	Mariah Carey	
May 16	"Found a Cure"	Ultra Naté	"My All" / "Fly Away (Butterfly Reprise)"	Mariah Carey	
May 23	"Found a Cure"	Ultra Naté	"My All" / "Fly Away (Butterfly Reprise)"	Mariah Carey	
May 30	"Shout to the Top"	Fire Island featuring Loleatta Holloway	"I Get Lonely"	Janet (Featuring BLACKstreet)	
June 6	"A Rose Is Still a Rose"	Aretha Franklin	"The Boy Is Mine"	Brandy & Monica	
June 13	"Sunchyme"	Dario G	"The Boy Is Mine"	Brandy & Monica	
June 20	"Ray of Light"	Madonna	"The Boy Is Mine"	Brandy & Monica	
June 27	"Ray of Light"	Madonna	"My All" / "Fly Away (Butterfly Reprise)"	Mariah Carey	
July 4	"Ray of Light"	Madonna	"My All" / "Fly Away (Butterfly Reprise)"	Mariah Carey	
July 11	"Ray of Light"	Madonna	"My All" / "Fly Away (Butterfly Reprise)"	Mariah Carey	
July 18	"Sweet Freedom"	Shawn Christopher	"My All" / "Fly Away (Butterfly Reprise)"	Mariah Carey	
July 25	"Sweet Freedom"	Shawn Christopher	"My All" / "Fly Away (Butterfly Reprise)"	Mariah Carey	
August 1	"In My Life"	José Nunez featuring Octahvia	"The Boy Is Mine"	Brandy & Monica	
August 8	"Go Deep"	Janet	"The Boy Is Mine"	Brandy & Monica	
August 15	"Comin' Back"	The Crystal Method	"The Boy Is Mine"	Brandy & Monica	
August 22	"Catch the Light"	Martha Wash	"The Boy Is Mine"	Brandy & Monica	
August 29	"Here We Go Again"	Aretha Franklin	"The Boy Is Mine"	Brandy & Monica	
September 5	"Needin' U"	David Morales presents The Face	"The Boy Is Mine"	Brandy & Monica	
September 12	"Everybody Dance"	Barbara Tucker	"The Boy Is Mine"	Brandy & Monica	
September 19	"Oye!"	Gloria Estefan	"The Boy Is Mine"	Brandy & Monica	
September 26	"God Is a DJ"	Faithless	"The Boy Is Mine"	Brandy & Monica	
October 3	"Music Sounds Better with You"	Stardust	"The Boy Is Mine"	Brandy & Monica	
October 10	"Music Sounds Better with You"	Stardust	"The Boy Is Mine"	Brandy & Monica	
October 17	"Let Me Go... Release Me"	Veronica	"The Boy Is Mine"	Brandy & Monica	
October 24	"Nobody's Supposed to Be Here"	Deborah Cox	"The Boy Is Mine"	Brandy & Monica	
October 31	"Can't Get High Without U"	Joey Negro featuring Taka Boom	"The Boy Is Mine"	Brandy & Monica	
November 7	"The Freaks Come Out"	Cevin Fisher's Big Freak	"The Boy Is Mine"	Brandy & Monica	
November 14	"The Future of the Future (Stay Gold)"	Deep Dish with Everything but the Girl	"The Boy Is Mine"	Brandy & Monica	
November 21	"Love Him"	Donna Lewis	"The Boy Is Mine"	Brandy & Monica	
November 28	"Changes"	So Pure! featuring Sheleen Thomas	"The Boy Is Mine"	Brandy & Monica	
December 5	"The First Night"	Monica	"Believe"	Cher	
December 12	"Believe"	Cher	"Believe"	Cher	
December 19	"Believe"	Cher	"Believe"	Cher	
December 26	"Believe"	Cher	"Believe"	Cher	

== See also ==
- 1998 in music
- List of Billboard Hot 100 number ones of 1998
