= Erick Morillo discography =

This is the discography of American DJ and producer Erick Morillo.

== Extended plays and singles ==
- 1992 The New Anthem (Funky Budda) (Reel 2 Real)
- 1992 Muevelo (Reel 2 Real)
- 1992 Te Ves Buena (Reel 2 Real)
- 1993 I Like To Move It (Reel 2 Real)
- 1993 Latin Flavor (R.B.M.)
- 1993 Gettin' Me Hot (Platinum Crew)
- 1993 Carnival '93 (Club Ultimate)
- 1993 The Boy (R.B.M)
- 1993 Rhythmz (Deep Soul)
- 1993 Unbe (R.A.W.)
- 1993 House Of Love In My House (Smooth Touch)
- 1993 Go On Move (Reel 2 Real)
- 1995 Carnival '95 (Club Ultimate)
- 1995 Reach (Lil Mo' Yin Yang)
- 1995 Conway (Reel 2 Real)
- 1996 Latinos (Reel 2 Real featuring Proyecto Uno)
- 1996 Mueve La Cadera (Reel 2 Real featuring Proyecto Uno)
- 1996 Jazz It Up (Reel 2 Real)
- 1996 Are You Ready For Some More (Reel 2 Real)
- 1997 Fun (Da Mob featuring Jocelyn Brown)
- 1997 Partay Feeling (B-Crew)
- 1997 Tripping (Smooth Touch)
- 1998 It's All Good (Da Mob featuring Jocelyn Brown)
- 1998 Distortion (Pianoheadz)
- 1999 Believe (Ministers De-La-Funk featuring Jocelyn Brown)
- 2002 Come Make Me Over
- 2003 Dancin' (Erick Morillo featuring Harry "Choo Choo" Romero and José Nunez)
- 2004 Refresher (Time Of Your Life)
- 2004 My World (Erick Morillo featuring P. Diddy)
- 2005 Break Down The Doors (Erick Morillo featuring Audio Bullys)
- 2005 What Do You Want (Erick Morillo featuring Terra Deva)
- 2005 Waiting In The Darkness (Erick Morillo featuring Leslie Carter)
- 2006 Jazz In Your Face
- 2006 Call Me (The Dronez featuring Shawnee Taylor)
- 2006 Tonite (MNM featuring Shawnee Taylor)
- 2006 Dance I Said (Erick Morillo featuring P. Diddy)
- 2007 Life Goes On (Richard Grey vs. Erick Morillo featuring José Nunez and Shawnee Taylor)
- 2008 Make A Move Harry "Choo Choo" Romero featuring Erick Morillo and P. Diddy)
- 2008 Where Are You Now? (DJ DLG featuring Erick Morillo)
- 2009 Say The Word (Richard Grey featuring Erick Morillo featuring Maboo and Nicole Da Silva)
- 2009 I Get Lifted (Erick Morillo featuring Deborah Cooper)
- 2010 I Feel Love (Ministers De-La-Funk featuring Duane Harden)
- 2010 Alive Markus Binapfl and Erick Morillo featuring Fiora
- 2011 Live Your Life (featuring Eddie Thoneick and Shawnee Taylor)
- 2011 Stronger (featuring Eddie Thoneick and Shawnee Taylor)
- 2012 Elephant (Alexandra Burke featuring Erick Morillo)
- 2012: If this Ain't Love (featuring Eddie Thoneick and Skin)
- 2012: Colors (Shawnee Taylor featuring Sympho Nympho)
- 2012: Love in me (Shawnee Taylor featuring Denis The Menace and Sandro Monte)
- 2012: "Flameco" H.Romero, A. Kenji and E.Morillo ft Mati
- 2012: "Beat Of The Drum" TEKTONE ft Harry Romero
- 2012: "Murder The Dance Floor" E.Morillo featuring Konshens ft S.Nymph
- 2012: "Prelude" T3ktone
- 2012: "Keep On Dancin" In the Screen ft Rachel Starr
- 2013: "Addicted: J.Nunez & E. Morillo ft S.Taylor
- 2013: "Bang" Erick Morillo and Harry Romero
- 2013: "The Porno" E.Morillo H.Romero J.Nune
- 2013: "Conga Lust" E.Morillo H.Romero J.Nunez
- 2013: "Give It Up" E.Morillo H.Romero J.Nunez ft C.Fisher
- 2013: "Jungle Blood" E.Morillo H.Romero J.Nunez and SJRM
- 2013: "Palos & Drums" E.Morillo H.Romero J.Nunez
- 2013: "My Melody: E.Morillo H.Romero J.Nunez ft S.Taylor
- 2014: "Let The Freak Out" Carnage, E.Morillo, H.Romero ft Mr.V
- 2015: "Trapped: Erick Morillo Limitless Part 2
- 2015: "I Want You" Erick Morillo Limitless Part 1
- 2015: "Something for Carl Cox: Erick Morillo
- 2015: "The Restorer" Erick Morillo featuring Harry Romero
- 2015: "Devotion" E.Morillo and H. Romero featuring S.Taylor
- 2016: "Better Life:Junolar E.Morillo DJ Eako & Miss McClore
- 2016: "This Is How We Do It" Erick Morillo and Junolarc
- 2016: "Thunder & Lightning" Erick Morillo feat Eli and Fur
- 2016: "Better Life" Junolarc, Erick Morillo and DJ Eako feat Miss Msclore
- 2016: "Oooh" Erick Morillo featuring Angel Taylor
- 2016: "Polar Bear" Erick Morillo
- 2016: "Lost In You" Erick Morillo vs Eddie Thoneick ft Angel Taylor
- 2016: "Blinded" Erick Morillo and Junolarc
- 2016: "The Edge" Erick Morillo
- 2017: "Take Me Higher 2017" Mischa Daniels and Erick Morillo
- 2017: "Don't Belong" Junolarc and Erick Morillo featuring Ora Solar
- 2017: "No End" Erick Morillo featuring Kylee Katch
- 2017: "Gone" Erick Morillo, Junolarc and Chris Child featuring Ora Solar
- 2017: "Waves" with Kryder
- 2017: "Evil Ecstasy"
- 2017: "Bad Girl" with Junolarc featuring Ora Solar
- 2018: "Flashlight" with Junolarc featuring Redward Martin
- 2018: "Medication" with Jamie Jones featuring Gene Farris
- 2018: "Colombiano"
- 2018: "Cocoon" with Andrew Cole featuring Kylee Katch
- 2018: "Cartagena"
- 2019: "Fifth Element"

== Remixes ==
- 1994: Reel 2 Real - "Can You Feel It?" (Erick "More" Club Mix)
- 1996: Reel 2 Real - "Are You Ready For Some More?" (Erick "More" Dub)
- 2003: The Crystal Method - "Born Too Slow" (Erick Morillo Remix)
- 2013: Modjo - "Lady (Hear Me Tonight)" (Erick Morillo vs Who Da Funk Remix)
- kMorillo vs. Who Da Funk? Remix)
- 2015: Madonna - "Living For Love" (Erick Morillo Club Mix)
- 2016: Tom & Hills - "Energy in Magic" (Erick Morillo Mix)
- 2016: Afro Medusa - "Pasilda" (Erick Morillo Mix)
- 2017: Mischa Daniels - "Take Me Higher 2017" (Morillo Get In Your Head Mix)
- 2018: Erick Morillo and Andrew Cole featuring Kylee Katch - "Cocoon" (Erick Morillo and Harry Romero Remix)
- 2018: Erick Morillo, Junolarc and Chris Child featuring Ora Solar - "Pulling Me" (Erick Morillo and Harry Romero Remix)
- 2019: Eelke Kleijn featuring Ost - "Lost Souls" (Erick Morillo Remix)
- 2019: Antranig - "Jackin'" (Erick Morillo Remix)
- 2019: Joe Smooth - "Promised Land" (Erick Morillo Remix)
