= Move It! =

Studio album by Reel 2 Real
- Released: October 10, 1994
- Length: 56:02
- Label: Strictly Rhythm; Positiva
- Producer: Erick Morillo

Reel 2 Real chronology
Move It! (1994)	Reel 2 Remixed! (1995)

Move It! is the debut album by American electronic dance music project Reel 2 Real, featuring vocalist The Mad Stuntman. The musical project had seven top 10 hits on the US Hot Dance Music/Club Play chart in the 1990s including "I Like to Move It", which was a big hit in many other countries around the world. Other singles released from the album were "Go on Move", "Can You Feel It?", "Raise Your Hands" and "Conway".

== Critical reception ==
Professional ratings
Review scores
Source	Rating
AllMusic	2/5 stars
Billboard	(favorable)
Select	2/5 medals
Smash Hits	2/5

AllMusic said, "The mastermind of super DJ and remixer Erick Morillo, Move It combines the textures of Latin house music with a reggae vibe. Morillo is one of the world's busiest and most sought-after DJs and remixers. Some of Move It's other standout tracks are 'Raise Your Hands', 'Can You Feel It?', and 'Conway'." Billboard magazine complimented it as "a solid set that blends the best elements of the house and reggae idioms. International hits 'I Like to Move It' and the more recent 'Can You Feel It' kick with hard and aggressive percussion and rapid-tongued toasting that is positively irresistible." Caroline Sullivan from The Guardian named it "a respectable enough debut. The mood is upbeat, and singer The Mad Stuntman is equally proficient on ragga tracks like 'The Stuntman's Theme' and Eurodisco affairs such as 'Conway'."

Pan-European magazine Music & Media commented, "Scientists couldn't invent it, but these New Yorkers headed by the Mad Stuntman could: the pocket-size jukebox." The reviewer felt it "all [was] made according the same "Euro-goes-ragga" concept, with 'The Stuntman's Anthem' being the purest reggae effort of the lot. As such it's vaguely reminiscent of Double Trouble & The Rebel MC's 1989 hit 'Street Tough'." Lucie Cave from Smash Hits gave the album two out of five, writing, "Reel 2 Real have conjured up an album jam-packed with booming bass lines. And the Mad Stuntman proves that shouting loudly is not his only talent. 'One Life to Live' captures hints of a mellow Jamaican mood, but generally most of the tracks rely on all too familiar dance beats."

== Track listing ==
All tracks written by Erick Morillo and Mark Quashie, except where noted.

No.	Title	Writer(s)	Length
1.	"I Like to Move It" (UK Radio Edit)		3:51
2.	"Can You Feel It?"		4:25
3.	"Raise Your Hands"	Morillo; Quashie; Keith Litman	4:56
4.	"One Life to Live"	Morillo; Quashie; Peter Tulloch	4:19
5.	"The Stuntman's Anthem"	Morillo; Quashie; Tulloch	3:47
6.	"Erick "More"'s Anthem (Can You Feel It?)"		6:43
7.	"Conway"	Morillo; Quashie; Litman	4:40
8.	"Wine Your Body"		4:41
9.	"R.E.X."	Morillo; Quashie; Tulloch	4:27
10.	"Toety"		4:05
11.	"Go on Move"		4:11
12.	"I Like to Move It" (DJ Dero NRG Remix)		5:51

== Personnel ==
Adapted from the album's liner notes.

Musicians

- Erick Morillo – all keyboards, drum programming
- The Mad Stuntman – vocals
- Althea McQueen – vocals (tracks 2, 10 and 12), background vocals (track 6), additional vocals (track 11)
- The Joker – rap (track 4)
- Donovan G. McKitty – guitar (tracks 4, 8 and 12)
- Marcus Quintanilla – live percussion (track 2)
- Karl Wright – additional percussion (track 4)
- Peter Tulloch – additional vocals (tracks 3 and 7), additional keyboards (track 8)
- Jose Nuñez – additional percussion (tracks 5, 7 and 10)

Production

- Erick Morillo – producer (all tracks), mixing (all tracks)
- Keith Litman – producer (tracks 1, 3 and 6)
- Peter Tulloch – producer (tracks 4, 5 and 9)
- Ralphie Muniz – producer (tracks 1 and 11)
- DJ Dero – additional production and remix (track 12)
- Nicolas Querrieri – additional production and remix (track 12), engineer (track 12)
- Alejandro Guerrieri – additional production and remix (track 12)
- Tuti Gianakis – executive producer (track 12)
- Dave Lambert – edit (track 1)
- Jose Nuñez – engineer (tracks 2–10)
- Ani Phearce – additional arrangements (tracks 3 and 6)
- Mark Humphrey – photography
- Campagna, New York – design
- Mastered at Townhouse, London, by Gordon Vicary

== Charts ==
Chart performance for Move It!
Chart (1994)	Peak position
Australian Albums (ARIA)	135
Austrian Albums (Ö3 Austria)	37
Dutch Albums (Album Top 100)	71
German Albums (Offizielle Top 100)	63
Hungarian Albums (MAHASZ)	13
Swiss Albums (Schweizer Hitparade)	42
Scottish Albums (OCC)	28
UK Albums (OCC)	8
