= Are You Ready for Some More? =

Studio album by Reel 2 Real
- Released: 1996
- Genre: Electronic, house, reggae fusion
- Length: 59:51
- Label: Strictly Rhythm, Positiva
- Producer: Erick Morillo

Reel 2 Real chronology
Reel 2 Remixed (1995)	Are You Ready for Some More? (1996)

Professional ratings
Review scores
Source	Rating
AllMusic	3/5 stars
The Guardian	3/5 stars
Music Week	3/5 stars

Are You Ready for Some More? is the third and final album released by the house and reggae-influenced musical project Reel 2 Real. By the end of 1996, the producer, Erick Morillo, had abandoned the alias Reel 2 Real and began establishing himself as an underground DJ.

== Critical reception ==
AllMusic editor John Bush wrote, "Reel 2 Real's sophomore album is a bit less focused on hit singles, especially so considering it doesn't contain the megahit "I Like to Move It". Though there are plenty of charting singles included -- the title track "Mueve la Cadera (Move Your Body)", "Jazz It Up", -- Morillo attempts to diversify, including another update of the Gamble-Huff chestnut "Now That We Found Love" and the ballad "Love Hurts." He's only occasionally successful, though, making one wish he'd stick to hit singles."

== Track listing ==
All tracks are produced by Erick Morillo with co-producers Laron Cue, Jose Nunez, Peter Tulloch, and Armand Van Helden, featuring vocals by Althea McQueen and Mark Quashie.

No.	Title	Also Featuring	Length
1.	"Are You Ready for Some More?"		4:07
2.	"Jazz It Up"		4:10
3.	"Life's Funny"		4:24
4.	"Pick Your Choice"		3:51
5.	"Mueve La Cadera"	Proyecto Uno	5:08
6.	"Ouhh, Baby Baby"	Octavia Lambertis	4:52
7.	"Do Not Panic"		4:45
8.	"Love Hurts"		5:05
9.	"Now That We Found Love"	Michael Watford	3:24
10.	"Jump Around"		3:32
11.	"Wicked & Wild"		6:21
12.	"I Like It Like That"		3:57
13.	"Are You Ready for Some More?" (Erick "More" Dub)		6:15
