= George Morel =

Disc jockey and record producer

George Morel (born 20 September 1967 in New York) is an American DJ and record producer. He is considered "one of the central figures in the early-'90s New York garage/house scene".

== Life and career ==
Morel was born in New York City. His DJ career began in the New York clubs Red Zone, Palladium, Traxs and Save the Robots.

His record producing career started in 1989, when he co-wrote and co-produced Dee Halloway's single "Our Love Is Over" together with David Cole of C+C Music Factory. In 1990, he co-wrote and co-produced 2 in a Room's single "Wiggle It", reaching number one on the US Billboard Dance chart.

In 1992, Morel became the A&R vice president of the Strictly Rhythm label. Most of his productions during the 1990s were released on that label, among them a series of eleven 12" records called Morel's Grooves from 1992 to 1997, each 12" showcasing his Latin house sound and being quite popular and influential. As an A&R, he signed landmark dance records such as "Follow Me" by Aly-Us, "I Like to Move It" by Reel 2 Real, "Who's Been Changing Your Mind", and many other influential releases.

His chart hits include "Officer Where's Your Brother? (Get Her)" in 1995 (US Dance #17) and "Let's Groove" in 1993 (US Dance #33, UK #42).

During his career, Morel received six gold record awards, two platinum record awards and four Billboard Music Awards.
