= Go on Move =

1993 single by Reel 2 Real

Single by Reel 2 Real featuring The Mad Stuntman

from the album Move It!
- Released: 1993
- Genre: Eurodance; house; ragga
- Length: 4:12
- Label: Strictly Rhythm
- Songwriters: Erick Morillo; Mark Quashie
- Producer: Erick Morillo

Reel 2 Real singles chronology
| "The New Anthem" (1992) | "Go on Move" (1993) | "I Like to Move It" (1994) |

Music video
- "Go on Move" on YouTube

"Go on Move" is a song by American solo project Reel 2 Real (Erick Morillo), featuring ragga vocals by Trinidad and Tobago rapper the Mad Stuntman (a.k.a. Mark Quashie). Originally released in 1993 by Strictly Rhythm as a single from the project's debut album, Move It! (1994), it was re-released in 1994 after the success of "I Like to Move It". "Go on Move" became a top-10 hit in Canada, Finland, Ireland, the Netherlands and the UK. In the latter nation, the song reached number seven on the UK Singles Chart. But on the UK Dance Singles Chart, it was an even bigger hit, peaking at number two. In the US, it peaked at number six on the Billboard Hot Dance Music/Club Play chart, while it peaked at number one on the Canadian RPM Dance/Urban chart. The accompanying music video was directed by Craig McCall.

== Critical reception ==
Pan-European magazine Music & Media said, "Recommended by Swedish star producer Denniz Pop himself as the sole innovators of pop dance at the moment, the three live up to his endorsement again with a spirited ragga/Euro mix." Andy Beevers from Music Week gave 'Go on Move' five out of five and named it Pick of the Week in the category of Dance, writing, "This single gets a belated UK release in the wake of the phenomenal 'I Like to Move It'. It shares the winning formula of pumping house rhythms and crowd pleasing ragga chat from The Mad Stuntman. Featuring new mixes from Erick Morillo and Jules & Skins, it is shaping up to be another smash."

Dele Fadele from NME commented, "Real To Real are here again with the same ingredients mixed up in a different order and you can only hope people continue to buy the old single: otherwise, double trouble." Tim Jeffery from the Record Mirror Dance Update stated that "this is sure to be a chart hit". Another RM editor, James Hamilton, described the song as a "gruff ragga 'g'wan move' shouting and 'blippily bebop' scatting drily percussive 'I Like to Move It' type bogie shuffler". In his review of the Move It! album, Gareth Grundy from Select wrote, "For sheer pop cheek, only 'Go on Move' matches that title track." Emma Cochrane from Smash Hits gave it two out of five, viewing it as an "average record".

== Music video ==
The music video for "Go on Move" was directed by Craig McCall, who had previously directed the video for "I Like to Move It". It features the Mad Stuntman performing in a club. Other scenes shows him wearing a strait-jacket or being shot into the sky in a cannon. "Go on Move" was A-listed on German music television channel VIVA in August 1994. Same month, it received active rotation on MTV Europe, while it was B-listed on France's MCM in October 1994.

== Track listings ==
- 12-inch, US (1994)
1. "Go on Move '94" (Erick "More" 94 Vocal Mix) — 6:14
2. "Go on Move '94" (Smooth Touch Gets Phearce Dub) — 5:25
3. "Go on Move '94" (Roy's Deep Dungeon Mix) — 9:02
4. "Go on Move '94" (Reel 2 Reel '94 Dub) — 4:57
- CD maxi, France (1994)
1. "Go on Move" (Erick "More" Radio Edit) — 4:12
2. "Go on Move" (Erick "More" '94 Vocal Mix) — 6:14
3. "Go on Move" (Smooth Touch Gets Phearce Dub) — 5:25
4. "Go on Move" (Roy's Deep Dungeon Mix) — 9:02
5. "Go on Move" (Reel 2 Real '94 Dub) — 4:57
6. "Go on Move" (Erick "More" Original Mix) — 5:08
7. "Mad Stuntman" — 3:47
- CD maxi (Remix), Europe (1994)
1. "Go on Move" (Eric 'More' Morillo 94 Vocal Mix Edit) — 4:10
2. "Go on Move" (Judge Jules & Michael Skins Scream Up Mix) — 6:19
3. "Go on Move" (Eric 'More' Morillo 94 Vocal Mix) — 6:14
4. "Go on Move" (Moveapella) — 3:12

== Charts ==
=== Weekly charts ===
| Chart (1993–1994) | Peak position |
|---|---|
| Australia (ARIA) | 79 |
| Austria (Ö3 Austria Top 40) | 16 |
| Belgium (Ultratop 50 Flanders) | 16 |
| Canada Retail Singles (The Record) | 6 |
| Canada Dance/Urban (RPM) | 1 |
| Europe (Eurochart Hot 100) | 12 |
| Europe (European Dance Radio) | 6 |
| Finland (Suomen virallinen lista) | 4 |
| France (SNEP) | 12 |
| Germany (GfK) | 20 |
| Ireland (IRMA) | 6 |
| Israel (Israeli Singles Chart) | 16 |
| Netherlands (Dutch Top 40) | 10 |
| Netherlands (Single Top 100) | 11 |
| Scotland (OCC) | 11 |
| Sweden (Sverigetopplistan) | 15 |
| Switzerland (Schweizer Hitparade) | 18 |
| UK Singles (Official Charts) | 7 |
| UK Dance (Official Charts) | 9 |
| UK Dance (Music Week) | 2 |
| UK Club Chart (Music Week) | 5 |
| US Hot Dance Club Play (Billboard) | 6 |

=== Year-end charts ===
| Chart (1994) | Position |
|---|---|
| Canada Dance/Urban (RPM) | 17 |
| Europe (Eurochart Hot 100) | 99 |
| UK Singles (OCC) | 98 |
| UK Club Chart (Music Week) | 93 |

== Release history ==
| Region | Date | Format(s) | Label(s) | Ref. |
|---|---|---|---|---|
| United States | 1993 | 12-inch vinyl | Strictly Rhythm | |
| United Kingdom | June 20, 1994 | 7-inch vinyl; 12-inch vinyl; CD; cassette | Positiva | |
| Australia | August 22, 1994 | CD; cassette | Positiva; Strictly Rhythm | |
