= The Mad Stuntman =

Trinidad and Tobago musician (born 1966)

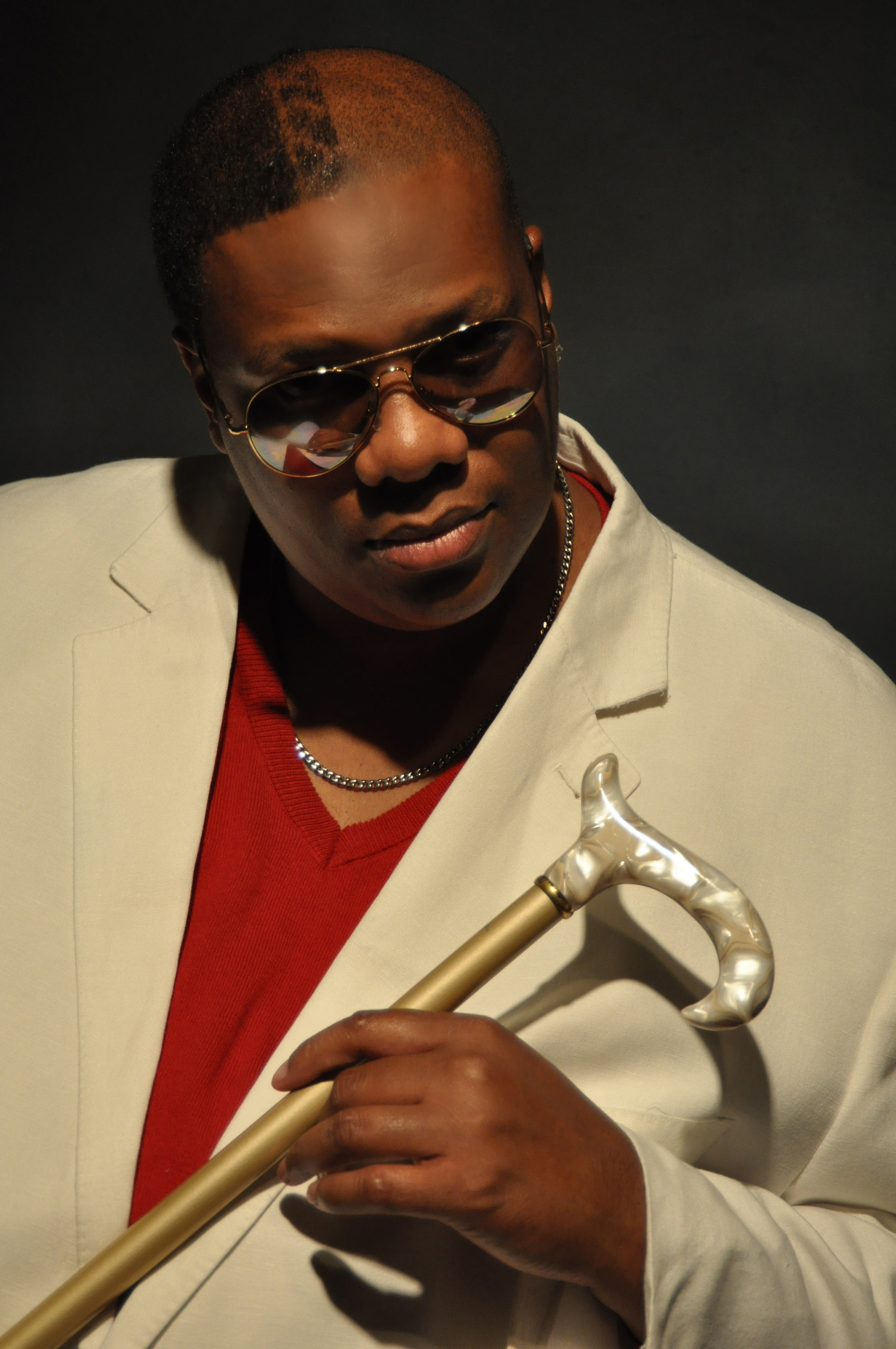
- The Mad Stuntman in 2014

Background information
- Born: Mark Quashie; 24 January 1966 (age 60); Port of Spain, Trinidad and Tobago
- Genres: Electronic dance music, reggae fusion
- Occupations: Singer, songwriter, rapper
- Label: Strictly Rhythm Positiva Records EMI
- Website: themadstuntman.com

Mark Quashie (born 24 January 1966), better known as The Mad Stuntman, is a Trinidadian-born American electronic dance artist and vocalist. Quashie's moniker was inspired by the 1980s action/adventure television program The Fall Guy which starred actor Lee Majors as a Hollywood stuntman, moonlighting as a bounty hunter. Making his home in Brooklyn, New York, The Mad Stuntman was introduced to producer/DJ Erick Morillo by Panamanian reggae artist El General, who is dubbed the "Father of Reggaeton". Morillo was looking for an act to be featured on his upcoming single "Go On Move" and to ultimately join him on tour as a group. "Go On Move" was originally intended to be an underground dub track, primarily instrumentals with minimal vocal showcasing on the hook, however the distinct energetic rough reggae style vocals of The Mad Stuntman propelled the 1992 single into mainstream success, and prompted its modification for commercial release.

"Go On Move" peaked at number 6 on the U.S. dance charts, which began Reel 2 Real featuring The Mad Stuntman's ascent into popular mainstream music. The Latin-reggae duo's sophomore 1993 single "I Like to Move It" became the group's most commercially successful and recognizable song, topping both American and European charts. The single quickly achieved number one hit status, first peaking in France and The Netherlands, before becoming a chart-topping hit throughout Europe. In 1994, the song peaked at number 89 on the U.S. Billboard Hot 100 chart. Reel 2 Real's "Move It Move It" featuring The Mad Stuntman continued to gain global popularity, hitting number 5 on the UK Singles Chart and reaching number eight on the U.S. Hot Dance chart. The Mad Stuntman proved to be one of Erick Morillo's most valuable artists, appearing on four of Reel 2 Real's top ten dance hits.

In 2005, DreamWorks Studios used the song in its first installment of the Madagascar franchise. British comedian Sacha Baron Cohen was cast to voice the character of King Julien XIII and perform his rendition of the song. Madagascar‍'s use of "I Like to Move it" in the film, made the song a popular anthem for millions of viewers worldwide. Producer will.i.am duplicated The Mad Stuntman's style for his character Moto Moto in Madagascar 2, while acclaimed comedian/actor Chris Rock gave a colorful mash-up performance of the song, "Afro Circus/I Like to Move It" as Marty The Zebra in Madagascar 3: Europe's Most Wanted.

== Discography ==
=== Albums ===
- 1994 Move It!
- 1995 Reel 2 Remixed
- 1996 Are You Ready for Some More?

=== Singles ===
Year	Single	Peak chart positions												Certifications (sales thresholds)	Album
Year	Single	AUS	AUT	FIN	FRA	GER	IRE	NED	SUI	SWE	UK	US	U.S. Dance	Certifications (sales thresholds)	Album
1992	"The New Anthem" (featuring Erick Moore)	—	—	—	—	—	—	—	—	—	—	—	1		Single only
1993	"Go On Move" (featuring The Mad Stuntman)	—	16	4	12	20	6	11	18	15	7	—	6		Move It
1993	"I Like to Move It" (featuring The Mad Stuntman)	6	2	10	1	3	5	1	4	12	5	89	8	FRA: Gold; GER: Gold; NETH: Gold; UK: Platinum	Move It
1994	"Can You Feel It?" (featuring The Mad Stuntman)	—	28	7	49	32	17	20	31	26	13	—	3		Move It
1994	"Raise Your Hands"	—	—	6	—	—	20	—	—	—	14	—	—		Move It
1995	"Conway" (featuring The Mad Stuntman)	—	—	9	—	—	—	—	—	—	27	—	4		Move It
1996	"Jazz It Up"	—	—	—	—	—	—	15	—	58	7	—	—		Are You Ready for Some More?
1996	"Are You Ready for Some More?"	—	—	—	—	—	—	—	—	—	24	—	5		Are You Ready for Some More?
1996	"Move Your Body (Mueve la Cadera)" (featuring Proyecto Uno)	—	—	—	—	—	—	—	—	—	—	—	—		Are You Ready for Some More?
2006	"Put ‘em Up (The Mad Stuntman) (featuring Rachelle)	—	—	—	—	—	—	—	—	—	—	—	—		
2018	"World Travels (Veronica Vitale)" (featuring The Mad Stuntman)	—	—	—	—	—	—	—	—	—	—	—	—		Inside The Outsider
"—" denotes releases that did not chart															Inside The Outsider

=== Soundtrack appearances ===
Title	Year	Artist(s)	Movie/Television series
"I Like to Move It'"	2001	Reel 2 Real ft. The Mad Stuntman	Saving Silverman
"I Like to Move It'"	2002	Reel 2 Real ft. The Mad Stuntman	The Master of Disguise
"I Like to Move It'"	2005	Reel 2 Real ft. The Mad Stuntman	Madagascar
"I Like to Move It"	2008	Reel 2 Real ft. The Mad Stuntman	Madagascar: Escape 2 Africa
"Afro Circus I Like to Move It"	2013	Reel 2 Real ft. The Mad Stuntman	Madagascar 3: Europe's Most Wanted
"Move It"	2021	Outrage feat. Alejandro	N/A
