= Fun (Da Mob song) =

Single by Da Mob featuring Jocelyn Brown
- Released: 1998
- Recorded: 1998
- Genre: Dance; house
- Length: 8:16
- Label: Subliminal Records
- Songwriter(s): Karen Gordon; Erick Morillo; José Nunez; Carlos Sosa
- Producer(s): Erick Morillo; José Nunez; Carlos Sosa

"Fun" is a song recorded by Da Mob, an American house music collective that featured producers Erick Morillo, José Nunez, Carlos "DJ Sneak" Sosa, singer/songwriter Karen "Dajae" Gordon (who wrote the single with the trio) and lead vocalist Jocelyn Brown, who chanted the song's main lyrics, "We're gonna have some fun tonight!" throughout the entire song.

The single reached number one on the US Billboard Hot Dance Club Play chart the week of April 18, 1998 and spent one week there. It was also the first single release from Morillo's label Subliminal Records, which he also launched in 1998. At first, "Fun" was supposed to feature Dajae as the lead vocalist, which drew positive response via test pressings and buzz across the Atlantic, but Dajae refused to sign the contract with Subliminal, and Brown was brought in to re-record the vocals. Brown's collaboration with Subliminal is known as "Da Mob", but in other countries she is listed alongside the act as the featured singer.

== Critical reception ==
A reviewer from Music Week wrote, "Jocelyn Brown's vocals are as scorching as ever, producing an uplifting track that could attract airplay as well as club attention." Andy Beevers from Record Mirror gave the song a full score of five out of five.

== Track listings ==
- 12" promo

A1. "Fun" (Main Vocal Mix) (8:16)
A2. "Fun" (Funk You Beats) (3:39)
B1. "Fun" (Mongofun Dub) (6:30)
B2. "Fun" (Sneak's Big Fun Mix) (7:25)
C1. "Fun" (Basement Jaxx's Vocal Mix) (7:50)
C2. "Fun" (Basement Jaxx's Mongoloid Dub) (7:15)
D1. "Fun" (Todd Edwards' Cut-Up Mix) (7:18)
D2. "Fun" (DJ Krust Made Me Do It Mix) (8:06)

- CD maxi (UK)
1. "Fun" (Original Edit) (3:56)
2. "Fun" (Main Vocal Mix) (8:16)
3. "Fun" (Sneaks Big Fun Mix) (6:40)
4. "Fun" (Mongo Fun Dub) (7:45)
5. "Fun" (Basement Jaxx's Vocal Mix) (6:27)
6. "Fun" (Funk You Beats) (3:39)

== Charts ==
| Chart (1998) | Peak position |
|---|---|
| UK Singles (OCC) | 33 |
| US Hot Dance Music-Club Play (Billboard) | 1 |
