= The New Anthem =

Single by Reel 2 Real featuring Erick More
- Released: 1992
- Recorded: 1992
- Genre: House
- Length: 5:40
- Label: Strictly Rhythm Records
- Songwriters: Erick Morillo; Ralphie "Boy" Muniz
- Producers: Gladys "Ski" Pizarro; Erick Morillo; Ralphie "Boy" Muniz

Reel 2 Real featuring Erick More singles chronology
"The New Anthem" (1992)	"Go on Move" (1993)

"The New Anthem" is a song recorded by the American music project Reel 2 Real featuring Erick "More" Morillo, which marked the act's first number-one single on the US Billboard Dance Club Songs chart. The single was written and produced by Morillo, Gladys "Ski" Pizarro and Ralphie "Boy" Muniz, and released in 1992 by Strictly Rhythm Records. It features two versions: The A side was listed as the "Funky Budda Side." The B side was the "Just Say No Side."

== Track listings ==
- 12 inch (US)

A1. "The New Anthem" (Funky Budda Mix) — 5:40
A2. "The New Anthem" (Funky Budda Instrumental) — 5:40
A3. "The New Anthem" (Budda Anthem) — 0:40
B1. "The New Anthem" (Not So Radio Mix) — 3:29
B2. "The New Anthem" (Union City Mix) — 5:08
B3. "The New Anthem" (Union City Instrumental) — 4:13

== Charts ==
Chart (1992)	Peak position
UK Dance (Music Week)	44
UK Club Chart (Music Week)	63
US Hot Dance Club Play (Billboard)	1
