= Reel 2 Remixed =

Remix album by Reel 2 Real
- Released: 1995 (UK)
- Length: 53:18
- Label: Positiva
- Producer: Erick Morillo, Ralphie Muniz

Reel 2 Real chronology
Move It! (1994)	Reel 2 Remixed (1995)	Are You Ready for Some More? (1996)

Reel 2 Remixed, the second album released by the house/reggae-influenced musical project Reel 2 Real, is a remix of their first album, Move It!.

Professional ratings
Review scores
Source	Rating
Muzik	3.5/5 stars
Select	2/5 medals
Smash Hits	1/5 stars

== Track listing ==
All tracks are produced by Erick Morillo with co-producers Keith Litman, Ralphie Muniz, and Peter Tulloch, featuring vocals by Althea McQueen and Mark Quashie.

No.	Title	Length
1.	"Go On Move" (Work Remix)	6:25
2.	"Can You Feel It?" (Roger's Basshit Mix)	7:09
3.	"I Like To Move It" (Alex Party X-Plode Remix)	4:19
4.	"Conway" (B.O.D. Club Mix)	4:16
5.	"Raise Your Hands" (Armand's Static Head Mix)	5:04
6.	"Can You Feel It?" (Duke Blows Da Blaster Dub And Da Duke Break)	8:58
7.	"Conway" (Way Out West Down Deep Mix)	4:32
8.	"Can You Feel It?" (Jules & Skins Piano Dub)	6:18
9.	"The Stuntman's Anthem" (Potential Bad Boy's Darkside Journey)	6:17
