= Latin house =

Subgenre of house music

- Other names: Samba house
- Stylistic origins: House; EDM; Latin music; reggae; dancehall; hip hop; reggaeton
- Cultural origins: Mid-to-late 1980s, New York City, Chicago, US
- Derivative forms: Merenhouse, Cumbia house

Latin house is an electronic dance music genre that combines house and Latin American music, such as that of Puerto Rican, Cuban, Dominican, and African origin.

== History ==
=== Origins ===
In the second half of the 1980s, some of the pioneers of house music of Latin-American descent gave birth to this genre by releasing house records in Spanish. Early examples include Jesse Velez's "Girls Out on the Floor" 1985, "Amor Puertorriqueño" by Raz on DJ International and "Break 4 Love" by Raze.

=== 1990s to present ===
In the 1990s, a new generation of producers and labels broke into the market. Nervous Records released "Quiero Saber" by the Latin Kings, produced by Todd Terry, as well as "Everything's All Right" by Arts of Rhythm and "Philly The Blunt" by Trinidad. Strictly Rhythm employed producer Armand van Helden, who released "Pirates of The Caribbean Vol. III". Songs from the same label include DJ Dero's "Sube", The Tribe's "Go-san-do", R.A.W.'s "Asuca" produced by Erick Morillo, Rare Arts' "Boricua Posse", Escandalo's "Mas Buena" and Fiasco's "Las Mujeres" produced by Norty Cotto, Latin Kaos' "El Bandolero" and "Muevete Mama" and "Sugar Cane" by Afro-Cube.

During the same period (1991 -1992), Chicago native Pizarro produced "The Five Tones", New Perspective EP, "Plastica", "Caliente" and "Perdoname". Other producers like Ralphi Rosario and Masters at Work created Latin house classics, for instance Ralphie's production "Da-Me-Lo" and his remix of Albita's "No se parece a nada" as well as "Sul Chu Cha" by Rosabel, the Louie Vega and Kenny Gonzales remix of "Sume Sigh Say" by House of Gypsies (Todd Terry), and "Robi Rob's Boriqua Anthem" by C+C Music Factory.

Hybrid experiments were put on the market by the likes of New York's Proyecto Uno, who combined house and merengue in their LPs Todo el mundo and In da House. Their female counterpart is Lisa M from Puerto Rico, who can be heard on the No lo derrumbes and Flavor of the Latin albums. Another merengue-house record worth of mention is "Así mamacita" by Henry Rivera on Los Angeles Aqua Boogie. Also from Los Angeles we had producer DJ Juanito who released Latin house hits like 'A Mover la colita' and 'Esa Nena Linda". The duo Sandy & Papo are known for their LPs Sandy & Papo and Otra Vez.

During the mid-1990s, Cutting broke into the Latin house scene and became the most representative label of this genre. Cutting's DJ Norty Cotto was deemed the most representative producer of Latin house. Among the various hits are 2 in a Room's "Las Mujeres", "Carnival" and "Dar la vuelta", Fun City's "Padentro" and "Baila", Sancocho's "Tumba la Casa", "Alcen las manos" and "Que siga el party" (LP) and Los Compadres' "La Rumba". Norty Cotto's mixed compilations also became classics. Fulanito and their LP El hombre mas famoso de la tierra is a combination of house and Latin-American rhythms from that time. El General's "Muevelo" was another of the tunes of that time remixed to the sounds of Latin house by DJ/producers Pablo Pabanor Ortiz and Erick More Morillo, and Latin House Party 2 in collaboration with producers Rafael Torres, Ray Abraxas and Davidson Ospina.

Today many other Latin house artists have emerged to create many successful songs of this genre, and also remixes.
