= Sandy & Papo =

Dominican musical duo

- Also known as: Sandy MC; MC Papo
- Origin: Santo Domingo, Dominican Republic
- Genres: Merenhouse; hip hop
- Years active: 1995–1999
- Label: Parcha Records
- Past members: MC Papo; Sandy MC

Sandy & Papo MC, Sandy MC & MC Papo or simply Sandy & Papo, were a duo of merengue and hip hop music. Its members were Sandy Carriello "Sandy MC" and Luis Deschamps "MC Papo", both from the Dominican Republic. The duo was created by Nelson Zapata and Pavel de Jesus, after attending an audition for Proyecto Uno.

The group was part of the merenhouse (called also "house-merengue" or "merengue-hip hop") style movement that emerged in New York City in the 1990s. The pair fused these genres with other dance music styles. Groups such as Proyecto Uno, Fulanito, Ilegales and El Cartel were part of this movement.

Sandy & Papo performed a version of the popular house hit "El Mueve Mueve" ("I Like to Move It" by Reel 2 Real). They created the song "Huelepega", which served to promote the Venezuelan 1999 film of the same name, directed by Elia Schneider.

The group came to an end when on July 11, 1999 when Luis Deschamps (MC Papo) died in a car accident. Sandy MC continued solo and received success with the song "Homenaje a Papo". Sandy MC died on December 23, 2020, due to heart attack.

== Soundtracks ==
In 2006, the Australian film Happy Feet included parts of the song "Candela" by Sandy MC & MC Papo.

== Discography ==
=== Sandy MC & MC Papo albums ===
- 1995: Sandy & Papo MC
- 1997: Otra Vez
- 1998: The Remix Album

=== Sandy MC solo albums ===
- 2000: Homenaje a Papo
- 2005: El Duro Soy Yo
- 2011: Insuperable
