= David Bronson (disambiguation) =

David Bronson may refer to:

- David Bronson (1800–1863), U.S. representative from Maine
- David Bronson (musician) (born 1976), American singer-songwriter and music producer
- Dave Bronson (born 1958), mayor of Anchorage, Alaska
