= Booty shake (disambiguation) =

Booty shake is a dance move.

Booty Shake is a title of songs by the following artists:

- 740 Boyz
- Gucci Crew II
- Matt Houston
- Max Vangeli
- Sonu Kakkar
- Tony Kakkar
