= Da Mob =

Da Mob was an American house collaboration between producer/DJs Erick Morillo, José Nunez and DJ Sneak, featuring vocals by Jocelyn Brown.

== Biography ==
Da Mob scored a number-one US Billboard Hot Dance Music/Club Play chart hit in 1998 with "Fun". The track was written by Karen Gordon (a.k.a. Dajae), who was supposed to be the featured singer on the single and had recorded a test pressing. However, a contract dispute between Gordon and Morillo's Subliminal Records resulted in Brown taking over the vocal duties when the single was released.

"Fun" peaked at No. 33 on the UK Singles Chart in May 1998, and a follow-up single, "It's All Good" reached No. 54 in July 1999. This track was remixed by Full Intention.

== See also ==
- List of number-one dance hits (United States)
- List of artists who reached number one on the US Dance chart
