= Gladys Pizarro =

American music executive

Gladys Pizarro is an American A&R executive, noteworthy for co-founding New York-based house music record label Strictly Rhythm.
