= David Morales =

American DJ and producer (born 1961)

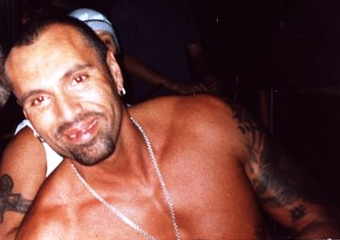
- Photo of David Morales 2001 in Ambasada Gavioli, Izola, Slovenia

Background information
- Born: August 21, 1961 (age 64); New York City, U.S.
- Occupations: DJ; record producer
- Website: djdavidmorales.com

David Morales (/məˈræləs/; born August 21, 1961) is an American disc jockey, record producer and remixer.

David Morales has remixed and produced over 500 releases for artists including Mariah Carey, Aretha Franklin, Michael Jackson, Janet Jackson, Spice Girls, Eric Clapton, Seal, Pet Shop Boys, U2, Donna Summer, Whitney Houston, Tina Turner, Madonna, Selena, Anastacia and Jamiroquai. Morales was nominated for his first Grammy Award in 1996 as a producer for the song “Daydream Interlude (Fantasy Sweet Dub Mix)” on Mariah Carey's album Daydream. He was nominated again the next year and won the 1998 Grammy Award for “Remixer of the Year”.

Morales is considered to be one of the first so-called superstar DJs. He has performed at many clubs around the globe, including numerous dates at Ibiza venues such as Pacha and Space. Morales also contributed to radio shows and released DJ mix compilations.

== Career ==
=== 1980s–1990s ===
David Morales grew up in an influential era for dance music and was a regular at his native New York's fabled clubs such as The Loft and the Paradise Garage. He also started his own night club in Brooklyn in 1981 at the Ozone Layer, taking cues from both the Paradise Garage and The Loft. His residency at the Ozone Layer (which lasted until 1986) led him to play at the Paradise Garage in 1983.

He was also a DJ at Club Zanzibar in Newark, New Jersey in the 1980s, home to the Jersey Sound brand of deep house or garage house.

After Morales became a regular DJ during the mid-1980s he began a remixing career, at the same time that remixing other artists became popular. Alongside Chicago house music pioneer Frankie Knuckles and For The Record DJ Pool founder Judy Weinstein, Morales founded Def Mix Productions to manage their work.

David Morales' solo production debut came in 1993 with the Mercury Records album The Program, credited to David Morales & The Bad Yard Club. In 1998, he released "Needin' U" on the Def Mix label, DMI Records, under the alias The Face. The track, licensed to Mercury Records UK, became a number one Dance Record and video which became licensed and covered globally.

=== 2000s–present ===
Ultra Records released Morales' second album Two Worlds Collide in 2005. The single "How Would You Feel" was performed by Lea Lorien. "Here I Am", performed by UK-based Irish artist Tamra Keenan (remixed by Kaskade), is featured in the 2006 film The Devil Wears Prada. "Feels Good", performed by Angela Hunte, features in the end credits of the 2008 film You Don't Mess with the Zohan.

In 2011, Ultra Records released Morales' third album Changes featuring the vocals of Róisín Murphy (formerly of the band Moloko), Ultra Nate, Tamra Keenan and Jonathan Mendelsohn. Since then, Morales has released several tracks including "The Red Zone Project" Volumes 1, 2 and 3 and various others on the Def Mix Music label. In 2016, Morales had a single with Janice Robinson titled "There Must Be Love". He then collaborated with Luciano on the song "Esperanza". In 2019, Morales started a new label with the Afro house label MoBlack called MoDef, and also released the single "Freedom" performed by Janice Robinson.

Morales was an owner of Stereo nightclub in Montreal, Quebec, Canada. As a resident DJ, he played many 16-hour "La Vie en Stereo" sets, which happened monthly for 9 years from 2003 to 2012.

David was a judge on Top DJ in 2016, a national television show broadcast on Italia 1, and was a model for Italian clothing designer Iceberg in 2008.

== Personal life ==
Morales was born in New York City. He is of Puerto Rican ancestry.

In October 2018, Morales was arrested in Japan after he was found with 0.3g of MDMA in his possession at Fukuoka Airport prior to scheduled performances in Fukuoka and Tokyo. He was released without charge the same month. The maximum penalty for possession of MDMA in Japan is seven years in prison and a JP¥3 million fine.

== Discography ==
=== Albums ===
- 1993: The Program
- 2004: 2 Worlds Collide
- 2012: Changes

=== Mixed compilations ===
- 1994: United DJs of America, Vol. 4
- 1997: Ministry of Sound: Sessions Seven
- 2000: UK*USA in collaboration with Danny Rampling
- 2003: Mix The Vibe: Past-Present-Future
- 2011: Live & Remastered (disc 2)

=== Singles ===
==== David Morales ====
- 2001: "Winners", with Jocelyn Brown
- 2003: "Make It Hot", with DJ Pierre
- 2004: "How Would U Feel", with Lea-Lorién
- 2005: "Feels Good", with Angela Hunte
- 2005: "Here I Am", with Tamra Keenan
- 2006: "Better That U Leave", with Lea-Lorien
- 2006: "How Would U Feel '06", with Lea-Lorien
- 2011: "You Just Don't Love Me", with Jonathan Mendelsohn
- 2011: "Holiday", with Polina
- 2012: "Golden Era", with Róisín Murphy
- 2012: "Stay", with Polina
- 2012: "Planet Called Love", with Ultra Nate
- 2013: "7 Days", with Tamra Keenan
- 2015: "There Must Be Love", with Janice Robinson
- 2019: "Freedom", with Janice Robinson

==== The Bad Yard Club ====
All are collaborations with Sly Dunbar and Handel Tucker.

- 1993: "Gimme Luv (Eenie Meeny Miny Mo)", with Papa San
- 1993: "Sunshine", with Stanryck
- 1993: "Forever Luv", with Anastacia
- 1993: "The Program", with Papa San
- 1994: "In De Ghetto", with Delta Bennett
- 1996: "In De Ghetto '96", with Crystal Waters and Delta Bennett
- 1998: "Wind up your body", with Delta Bennett

==== Other aliases ====
- 1987: "Do It Properly" (as 2 Puerto Ricans, a Blackman and a Dominican, with Ralphi Rosario and Clivilles & Cole)
- 1989: "Scandalous", (as 2 Puerto Ricans, a Blackman and a Dominican, with Ralphi Rosario and Clivilles & Cole)
- 1994: "Congo" (as The Boss)
- 1995: "Philadelphia", (as Brooklyn Friends)
- 1998: "Needin' U", (as David Morales presents The Face)
- 2000: "Higher", (as Moca, with Albert Cabrera and Deanna Della Cioppa)
- 2001: "Needin' U II", (as David Morales presents The Face, with Juliet Roberts)
- 2002: "Siren Of Love", (as 928)
- 2006: "Play", (as Brooklyn Friends)
- 2006: "Keep It Coming", (as The Face, with Nicki Richards)

=== Selected remixes ===
- 2 in a Room - "Wiggle It"
- 2 in a Room - "Do What You Want"
- Ace of Base - "Living in Danger"
- The Adventures of Stevie V - "Dirty Cash (Money Talks)"
- Alexander O'Neal - "What Is This Thing Called Love?"
- Alison Limerick - "Where Love Lives"
- Annie Lennox - "Walking on Broken Glass"
- Aretha Franklin - "A Deeper Love"
- Aretha Franklin - "Here We Go Again"
- Backstreet Boys - "I Want It That Way"
- Basement Jaxx - "Bingo Bango"
- Betty Boo - "Catch Me"
- Bizarre Inc - "Get Up (Sunshine Street)"
- Björk - "Big Time Sensuality"
- Björk - "Hyperballad"
- Black Sheep - "Strobelite Honey"
- The Brand New Heavies - "Never Stop"
- The Brand New Heavies - "Dream On Dreamer"
- The Brand New Heavies - "Stay This Way"
- Brandon Flowers - "Crossfire"
- Britney Spears - "Circus"
- Burak Kut - "Derdim Var" (Translated: Deep Inside)
- CeCe Peniston - "Finally"
- CeCe Peniston - "I'm In The Mood"
- CeCe Peniston - "Hit By Love"
- CeCe Peniston - "Keep Givin' Me Your Love"
- CeCe Peniston - "Somebody Else's Guy"
- CeCe Rogers - "All Join Hands"
- Celine Dion - "Loved Me Back to Life"
- Cerrone - "Love In C Minor"
- Chaka Khan - "Life is a Dance"
- Cher - "Woman's World"
- Clubhouse - "Deep In My Heart"
- The Chimes - "1-2-3"
- Crystal Waters - "What I Need"
- Daft Punk - "Get Lucky"
- The Daou - "Are You Satisfied?"
- De La Soul - "A Roller Skating Jam Named Saturdays"
- Deborah Cox - "It Could've Been You"
- Deborah Cox - "Who Do U Love"
- Diana Ross - "Upside Down"
- Diana Ross - "The Boss"
- Donna Summer - "Melody of Love (Wanna Be Loved)"
- Doop - "Doop"
- Electribe 101 - "You're Walking"
- Enrique Iglesias - "Rhythm Divine"
- Eric Clapton - "(I) Get Lost
- Eve Gallagher - "Love Come Down"
- FCL - "It's You"
- First Choice - "Love Thang"
- Frankie Knuckles - "Rain Falls"
- Gabrielle - "Give Me a Little More Time"
- Gloria Estefan - "Oye Mi Canto"
- Gloria Estefan - "Reach"
- Gloria Estefan - "Turn The Beat Around"
- Heavy D & The Boyz - "Now That We Found Love"
- Incognito - "Always There"
- India - "Right From The Start"
- Inner City - "Watcha Gonna Do With My Lovin'"
- INXS - "I'm Only Looking"
- Jamiroquai - "Cosmic Girl"
- Jamiroquai - "Space Cowboy"
- Jane Child - "Do Whatcha Do"
- Janet Jackson - "Because of Love"
- Janet Jackson - "Throb"
- Janet Jackson - "When I Think of You" (1995 Remixes)
- Janet Jackson - " Got 'til It's Gone with Frankie Knuckles
- Jaydee - "Plastic Dreams" (1997 Remixes)
- Jennifer Paige - "Crush"
- Jody Watley - "I'm The One You Need"
- Juliet Roberts - "Free Love"
- Kelis - "Get Along With You"
- Kristine W - "One More Try"
- Kylie Minogue - "Where Is The Feeling?"
- Kym Mazelle - "Useless"
- Kym Sims - "We Got A Love"
- Knight Time - "I've Been Watching You"
- Kuva - "Isn't It Time"
- Lara Fabian - "I Will Love Again"
- Lisa Stansfield - "What Did I Do to You?"
- Lisa Stansfield - "Someday (I'm Coming Back)"
- Lisa Stansfield - "Little Bit of Heaven"
- Lisa Stansfield - "8-3-1"
- Lisa Fischer - "Save Me"
- Loose Ends - "Love's Got Me"
- Lucas Frota featuring Blakkat - "Change (Will Come)"
- Lucrezia - "Live To Tell"
- Luther Vandross - "Ain't No Stoppin' Us Now"
- Luther Vandross - "The Mistletoe Jam (Everybody Kiss Somebody)"
- Luther Vandross - "The Rush"
- Luther Vandross & Janet Jackson - "The Best Things in Life Are Free"
- M People - "One Night in Heaven"
- M People - "Fantasy Island"
- M People - "Dreaming"
- Madonna - "Deeper and Deeper"
- Mariah Carey - "Always Be My Baby"
- Mariah Carey - "Can't Take That Away (Mariah's Theme)"
- Mariah Carey - "Dreamlover"
- Mariah Carey - "Fantasy"
- Mariah Carey - "Fly Away (Butterfly Reprise)"
- Mariah Carey - "Honey"
- Mariah Carey - "I Still Believe"
- Mariah Carey - "It's Like That"
- Mariah Carey - "Joy To The World"
- Mariah Carey - "Loverboy"
- Mariah Carey - "My All"
- Mariah Carey - "Say Somethin"
- Mariah Carey - "Shake It Off"
- Mariah Carey - "The Roof (Back In Time)"
- Mariah Carey - "Touch My Body"
- Masters At Work - "I Can't Get No Sleep '95"
- Michael Jackson featuring Justin Timberlake - "Love Never Felt So Good" (remixed by David Morales, Eric Kupper & Frankie Knuckles)
- Michael Jackson featuring Janet Jackson - "Scream"
- Michael Jackson - "This Time Around"
- Michael Jackson - "Thriller"
- Michelle Ayers - “Respect”
- Neneh Cherry - "Kisses on the Wind"
- Nightcrawlers - "Should I Ever Fall in Love"
- P. M. Dawn - "Gotta Be...Movin' On Up"
- Pet Shop Boys - "How Can You Expect to Be Taken Seriously?"
- Pet Shop Boys - "I Don't Know What You Want but I Can't Give It Any More"
- Pet Shop Boys - "New York City Boy"
- Pet Shop Boys - "So Hard"
- Pet Shop Boys - "Where the Streets Have No Name (I Can't Take My Eyes Off You)"
- Phil Perry - "Amazing Love"
- Photek - "Mine To Give"
- Reese - "You're Mine"
- Richard Darbyshire - "This I Swear" with Frankie Knuckles
- Robert Owens - "I'll Be Your Friend"
- Robin S. - "I Want to Thank You"
- Sandy B. - "Feel Like Singin'"
- Seal - "Newborn Friend"
- Selena - "I'm Getting Used to You"
- Shabba Ranks - "Mr. Loverman"
- Shara Nelson - "Down That Road
- Sheena Easton - "101"
- Smoke City - "Underwater Love"
- Soul Shaker featuring CeCe Peniston - Shame, Shame, Shame
- Sounds of Blackness - "I Believe"
- Spice Girls - "Spice Up Your Life"
- Spice Girls - "Stop"
- Spice Girls - "Who Do You Think You Are"
- Suzanne Palmer - "Luv 2 Luv"
- Taylor Dayne - "Say a Prayer"
- Technotronic - "Get Up!"
- Technotronic - "Pump Up The Jam"
- Technotronic - "Spin That Wheel"
- Tina Turner - "Goldeneye"
- Toni Braxton - "You're Makin' Me High"
- U2 - "Discotheque"
- U2 - "Lemon"
- Ultra Naté - "New Kind of Medicine"
- Utah Saints - "What Can You Do for Me"
- Vanessa Williams - "Happiness
- Whigfield - "Think Of You"
- Whigfield - "Sexy Eyes"
- Whitney Houston - "Love Will Save the Day" (remixed by David Morales & John "Jellybean" Benitez)
- Whitney Houston - "So Emotional"
- Yazz - "Stand Up for Your Love Rights"

== See also ==
- List of Puerto Ricans
- List of number-one dance hits (United States)
- List of artists who reached number one on the US Dance chart
