= Merenhouse =

Style of Dominican merengue music

- Other names: Merenrap, Merengue house
- Stylistic origins: Hip hop; dancehall; merengue; Latin house
- Cultural origins: 1990s, New York City, U.S.
- Typical instruments: Drum machine; keyboards; sampler; sequencer; synthesizers; percussions (conga; bata; timpani); trumpet; saxophone; trombone

Merenhouse, Merenrap or Electronic merengue, Mambo/Mambo de Calle is a style of Dominican Merengue music derived by blending it with dancehall, hip hop and house, particularly latin house. The mix of Latin, house and dancehall music started in New York City in the late 1980s.

Merenhouse usually employs rap-singing or talk-singing. It has instruments that are typically in Merengue music, such as saxophones, trumpets, accordions, bass, guitar, güira, and tambora, a kind of drum. However, it can be combined with electronic sounds or even electronic sounds sampled from the actual instruments (much like house music). Sampling music consists of reusing a sample or portion of a sound recording in a song. Merenhouse is very upbeat and intended for dancing, similar to house music; it is hard to identify merenhouse basing only on its time signature and its rhythm alone: some of them are in a fast 2/4 beat and has typical Merengue rhythms, while some other are in a slower 4/4 beat, identifying more with the hip hop style. Merenhouse can be characterized mostly by the using of instruments/electronics and the combination of vocal styles.

== History ==
=== Early development in the 1980s and the 1990s ===
The hybrid music known as Merenrap, Merenhouse, or Latin house was formed in the 1980s in New York City. Jorge Oquendo, an entrepreneur, encouraged artists to blend these genres. Lisa M mixed merengue with hip hop/rap in her second album released in 1990. Latin house, in turn, combines house, rap, Latin rhythms and Caribbean music.

=== Dominican migration to New York City in late twentieth century ===
Dominican Merengue can be considered an expression of Dominican transnationalism, as there was a significant shift in the migration of Dominicans to New York in the twentieth century. As a musical hybrid, merenhouse was popular with a generation of bicultural youth growing up in New York with Dominican roots that combined both aspects of their culture. Merenhouse is also a symbol of national identity to Dominican Americans.

The early 1990s saw a huge increase in immigration to the United States from the Dominican Republic due largely to the greatly deteriorating economic situation of the Dominican Republic in the 1980s and early 1990s. New York City saw the bulk of this initial Dominican population growth, and once those first Dominican immigrates got settled in, New York became the hub of Dominican culture in the US. "By 1990, an estimated 900,000 Dominicans — 12 percent of the country’s population — lived in New York City alone". Dominicans also "tend to be more concentrated residing exclusively in barrios or ghettos like Washington Heights, Manhattan-Inwood, home to 59% of Dominicans registered by the INS". This potent concentration of Dominicans all in one place allowed them to bring in their own culture while they assimilated into the melting pot of cultures found in New York. Merengue is one example of the many pieces of Dominican culture brought during this period of immigration, which was a key element to the creation of Merenhouse.

== Musical instrumentation ==
The new style was most importantly influenced by merengue, the national music and dance of the Dominican Republic. It is in a fast 2/4 beat that has African, Creole, and European origins which emerged during the early 20th century. Merengue has varying styles and a very distinct rhythm. During its beginnings, it included call-and-response vocals, a Spanish guitar, and a box lamellophone called the "Congolese marimbula". These instruments were later replaced with the acoustic guitar, acoustic bass, German accordion, the tambora, a West African two-headed drum, and the güira, which is a metal scraper. In the 1930s, Merengue was modernized and became the national symbol of the Dominican Republic, because orchestras played for the middle class and social elite. The sound became that of a more generic Latin band, and this included an instrument replacement for the piano, staple percussion and the acoustic bass. Merengue, in which merenhouse is based upon, developed in the 1980s and 1990s, and resulted from Juan Luis Guerra's incorporation of more modern sounding arrangements and socially relevant themes; he was also influenced by pop and jazz music.

== Music influences ==
Genres that were popular during the 1990s in New York City greatly influenced Dominican Americans to create "Merenhouse/Merenrap":

Reggae Reggae music, known as the Heartbeat of Jamaica, was born in this island in the late 1960s and derives from multiple indigenous genres, such as Ska (the first style to be born outside the United States, that is always in Jamaica in the late 1950s), and Rocksteady (also born in the same country, around 1966). It includes instruments like the bass drum, snare drum, keyboards, and guitars. When one thinks of Reggae music, first thinks of the Rastafari religion, which was created just in Jamaica during the 1930s; moreover, many associate Rastas and Reggae to its greatest representative, Bob Marley, also known as the Jamaican Icon.

Hip-Hop/Rap The term Hip-hop music refers to more than a music genre, because it encompasses various elements: Rapping, Graffiti, Deejaying, EmCeeing, and Breakdancing. The musical aspect, called Rap music (the act is named Rapping), can be defined as a style where lyrics are half spoken, half sung in short phrases, sometimes rhyming, and accompanied by a musical beat in the background; it had the opposite direction compared to other genres, because it was experimented in lives (in the early 1970s) and only at a later time (from the late 1970s) its singers, the rappers, began to record their songs and albums in studios. The Wall Graffiti phenomenon in hip hop can be traced back to The Bronx, New York City, in the 1960s–1970s, where it started to gain popularity with the prevalence of "Street Gangs". As ways of sound production present in this genre there are the toasting, took from the reggae tradition, and several different techniques of DeeJaying (from Deejay, that stands for "Disc Jockey"), like scratching (invented by a DJ named "Theodor") and "punch phasing"; the Djing of hip hop, however, is different in relation to the reggae one. The EmCeeing (from MC, which stands for "Master of Ceremonies") element in this style, moreover, consists in a person who is capable to entertain a public at events, and lets perform and sometimes presents deejays. Lastly, the Breakdancing aspect in hip hop is a competition in a context of street gangs between usually two dancers, with a music in the background that features "breaks", in which the winner is chosen by a variety of criteria; this phenomenon of hip hop culture was born always in The Bronx borough of New York City, in the poorer Afro-American and Latin communities in the early 1980s.

House music House music is considered a music genre of Electronic dance music (EDM), which was born in Chicago, Illinois in the early 1980s but not mainstream until the early 1990s, and it is heavily influenced by disco. As of musical instruments, the synthesizer is most commonly associated with it and the music is often characterized by its continuous and repetitive beat. This style of EDM was pioneered by DJ Frankie Knuckles, who moved from playing others' records to making his own music. There are many subgenres of House music, including "acid house", "latin house", and other EDM styles also derive from it, such as "techno", "trance" "drum and bass" and "jungle", as well as many more. This genre also has close ties to hip-hop, mainly because both were born around the same period.

== Influential Artists ==
- Fulanito is a Dominican-American Merenhouse band based in Washington Heights, Manhattan, in New York City. They have received acclaim from being one of the first groups to combine merengue and house music, selling around 2 million albums around the world.
- Proyecto Uno is another Dominican-American Merenhouse group from New York City's East Side, which helped popularize a musical style that blends Merengue with hip hop, dancehall, and techno. They won Billboard Latin Music Awards, Premios Los Nuestro, and an Emmy Award.
- Ilegales (also called "Los Ilegales") is a Grammy-nominated Dominican Merenhouse trio. They reached the Billboard Tropical charts and were nominated for a Latin Grammy award for "Best Pop Album".
- Sandy & Papo was a duo of Merengue and Hip hop, with temporary residence in Venezuela. It was made by Sandy Carriello "Sandy MC" and Luis Deschamps "MC Papo", both from the Dominican Republic. The group came to an end when on July 11, 1999, when Luis Deschamps (MC Papo) died in a car accident. Sandy MC continued as a solo and received success with a song titled "Homenaje a Papo".
- Dark Latin Groove (or "DLG") is a salsa band which mixes this genre with reggae, Hip hop, and reggaeton. The group was nominated for the Grammy for "Best Traditional Tropical Album" in 1997 and Premio Los Nuestro award for "Best Tropical Group".
- Lisa M is the first major female Latin rapper. The song "Tu Pum-Pum" is the first Merenrap song, which was included in her second album No Lo Derrumbes, released in 1990.
- Los Ficos is a Merengue rap group that mixes this style with Contemporary R&B and Hip hop.
- Calle Ciega is the first Venezuelan boy band of Merengue house.

== See also ==
- Latin rap
