= David Bronson (musician) =

American singer-songwriter

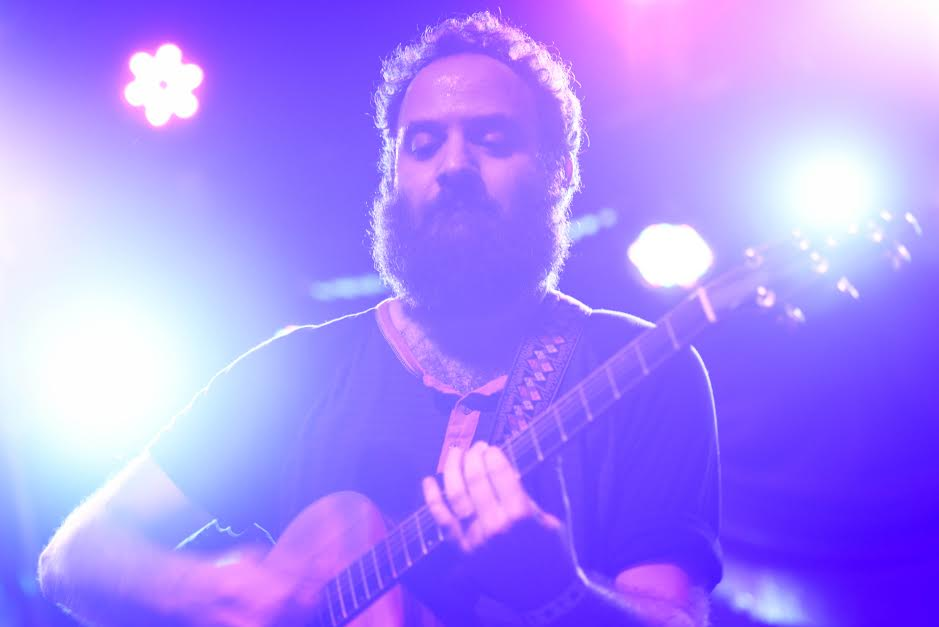
- David Bronson live at Brooklyn Bowl

Background information
- Born: December 20, 1976 (age 49); New York City
- Genres: Folk rock, indie rock, indie folk, soul rock
- Occupations: Singer-songwriter, producer, arranger, musician
- Instruments: Vocals, guitar, bass, keyboards, percussion
- Years active: 2004–present
- Website: DavidBronsonMusic.com

David Bronson (born December 20, 1976) is an American singer-songwriter and music producer from New York City. Bronson is known for writing and recording highly autobiographical material.

== Early life ==
Bronson was born in New York City and grew up in suburban New Jersey. He has two brothers, one of whom is an identical twin, with whom he began playing music at a young age. He started playing guitar at the age of 11, and has said that much of his guitar instruction came from playing along to Led Zeppelin and Grateful Dead albums in high school. Bronson has said that it was during this time that he made his first attempts at songwriting.

Bronson attended college at the University of Michigan in Ann Arbor, Michigan, and later attended Pratt Institute in Brooklyn, New York, where he received an MFA in film and video and worked toward a master's degree in Art History. His MFA thesis included early versions of songs that would appear on The Long Lost Story.

== Career ==
=== The Long Lost Story ===
In 2012 Bronson self-released his debut album Story, which is the second narrative half, but first released half of the autobiographical song cycle The Long Lost Story. The record was released in June 2012 in the U.S. and January 2013 in the United Kingdom and Europe. The first narrative half of the project, The Long Lost, was released next, in 2013, both in the U.S. and Europe. Bronson has been quoted as saying that Beck's Sea Change album, Peter Gabriel's Us album, and the work of music producer Daniel Lanois were all significant influences on The Long Lost Story.

The Long Lost Story, which began as Bronson's way of chronicling the end of an important relationship, has been described as Bronson's "own musical time capsule, comprised of autobiographical songs that tell tales of the hardest period of his life." The double album cycle was written by Bronson to feature only two voices, his own, and a female counterpart, which was sung by vocalist Maria Neckam, who has also performed in Bronson's live band.

=== Questions ===
In January 2015, Bronson released his third studio album, Questions. The record was co-produced by veteran record producer Godfrey Diamond, who had previously worked with Bronson on finishing the recording of The Long Lost Story and mixed both of those albums. Bronson has stated that the album title comes from the fact that during the course of writing the songs, he began to notice that questions are asked or referred to in each song.

Questions has been described as having a "Soul-Infused Rock" sound. Bronson himself has stated that he intended to bring elements of soul music into the album, and has specifically mentioned the 1975 David Bowie album Young Americans as being a notable reference in interviews. Producer Godfrey Diamond has said that, upon hearing Bronson's intentions, made arrangements to invite veteran vocalists Robin Clark and Gordon Grody to sing on the album, (Clark was one of the background vocalists who sang on the Young Americans album, along with Luther Vandross and Ava Cherry). It was through Clark that longtime Bowie guitarist Carlos Alomar and vocalist Lea-Lórien, who are Clark's husband and daughter respectively, became involved in the production. Bronson also brought back some of the musicians who had recorded on The Long Lost Story, most notably Guitarist/Bassist Robbie "Seahag" Mangano, who plays on the entirety of Questions, and vocalist Maria Neckam. A number of key album personnel played with Bronson for the first time on the album, most notably drummer Lautaro Burgos and keyboard player Rob Clores.

Bronson released a number of music videos to support the album. The official video for the song "Songbird" premiered on Entertainment Weekly's website on December 11, 2014. The video depicted Bronson and his bandmates driving in a car, playing and singing the song. The official video for the song "Connect the Dots" was featured on the United Kingdom's MOJO music website on December 18, 2014, alongside an interview with Carlos Alomar on his involvement with Bronson and the making of Questions. On April 8, 2015 the popular culture website PopMatters premiered the official video for the song "Song of Life" which was directed by Ben Goldstein, whose concept for the video included photographing real-life couples interacting in front of the camera.

== Style ==
Bronson's music has been characterized as falling within a number of genres and categorizations, including singer-songwriter, folk-rock, indie rock, indie folk, new folk, and soul-infused rock, while numerous reviewers have maintained that Bronson has a sufficiently unique sound that is difficult to categorize.

== Discography ==
- Story (2012)
- The Long Lost (2013)
- Questions (2015)
