= Needin' U =

1998 single by David Morales

Single by David Morales
- Released: 1998
- Genre: House
- Length: 7:53 (Original Mistake)
- Label: Definity Records
- Songwriter: David Morales
- Producer: David Morales

David Morales singles chronology
"In De Ghetto" (1996)	"Needin' U" (1998)	"How Would U Feel" (2004)

Music video
- "Needin' U" on YouTube

"Needin' U" is a house record written and produced by David Morales, under the pseudonym David Morales Presents The Face. The track's retail release was on Manifesto Records in the summer of 1998, but it had been available to DJs several months prior on Definity Records. The song quickly became a big hit in the club scene and would go on to become its artist's biggest hit and a house music anthem.

== Background ==
Morales originally created "Needin' U" as a demo, resulting from his experimenting with various samples over a three-hour period, which he never intended to release to the public. However, following positive reactions from fans and other DJs after Morales started including the track in DJ sets, he decided to release it commercially.

== Production and samples ==
The track was made featuring samples from The Chi-Lites' "My First Mistake" and Rare Pleasure's "Let Me Down Easy", which had previously been sampled as the backbone of UK band Spearmint's single, 'A trip into space', released earlier the same year. It has been suggested that Morales may have been prompted to the Rare Pleasure original by Spearmint's sampling. In light of Morales' roots as a DJ and producer in the New York house scene and as both Let Me Down Easy and My First Mistake were Paradise Garage classics remixed and played by Larry Levan, there seems to be a quite good chance though that Morales had knowledge (also) of the Rare Pleasure original unrelated to Spearmint's single. The rather short time (for production standards in house music and for US DJs at that time) between the release of Spearmint's and Morales' single and that the former was primarily a hit in the UK speak further against the claim that A Trip Into Space inspired Morales to make use of the Rare Pleasure sample for a house track. The Morales record became an overnight classic and introduced him into mainstream airplay.

== Remixes and alternative versions ==
There are a variety of remixes and alternative versions of "Needin' U" - some official, some not. The majority of these different versions were produced by David Morales himself. The most noteworthy of these being the 10-Minute extended version "Boss Anthem Mix" and a shorter mix with less of a vocal element entitled "Need-A-Dub". In addition to these versions which offer a slight variation on the original version, a remix by Albert Cabrera titled "One Rascal Mix" was also produced. In addition, the single was re-released in 2001 with a brand new vocal version of the song featuring the British electronic music vocalist Juliet Roberts. This new version, with original lyrics and vocals was titled "Needin U II" New releases of the single also included a new remix - "Dark Face Dub" which was also produced by Morales.

== Charts ==
=== "Needin' U" ===
Chart (1998)	Peak position
Germany (GfK)	66
Ireland (IRMA)	18
UK Dance (Official Charts)	1
UK Singles (Official Charts)	8
US Dance Club Songs (Billboard)	1

=== Year-end charts ===
Chart (1998)	Position
UK Singles (OCC)	158

=== "Needin' U II" ===
Chart (2001)	Peak position
Australia (ARIA)	87
Ireland (IRMA)	18
Spain (Promusicae)	12
UK Singles (Official Charts)	11
UK Dance (Official Charts)	4
US Dance Club Songs (Billboard)	1

== Certifications ==
Region	Certification	Certified units/sales
United Kingdom (BPI)	Silver	200,000^{‡}
^{‡} Sales+streaming figures based on certification alone.
