= House of Prince (band) =

House Of Prince is an electronica and dance music duo comprising vocalist Özlem Cetin and producer Gerret Frerichs. In 1998 they hit #1 on the Hot Dance Music/Club Play chart with the song "Perfect Love". The track was officially credited to House Of Prince featuring Oezlem.

== See also ==
- List of number-one dance hits (United States)
- List of artists who reached number one on the US Dance chart
