= Octahvia =

American singer

Octahvia (sometimes credited as Octavia or Octah'via) is the stage name of Octavia C. Lambertis, a singer from New York City. While she would later have several hits as a featured vocalist for other artists, she is perhaps best known under her own name for the 1986 R&B/dance hit, "2 the Limit."

== Early career ==
Born Octavia Lambertis, Octavia first rose to prominence in the mid-1980s when she received significant recognition for her performance as Doris Winter in the off-Broadway musical, Mama, I Want to Sing! (for which a film version was released straight-to-DVD in 2012). During this time, she was discovered by budding hip hop singer-songwriter/record producer Kenny Beck, who had recently written the song "2 the Limit" (which was originally titled "It's Over Now"). Beck invited Lambertis to record this song, and after being courted by several record labels, she ultimately signed with Pow Wow Records. Her version of "2 the Limit," released simply under the name Octavia became a minor hit on the R&B chart in 1986.

The following year, she released another Beck-penned single on the Pow Wow label titled "Cutey," but it failed to make an impression on the charts.

== Subsequent career ==
She would go on to score a pair of number-ones on the Billboard Hot Dance Club Play chart: as part of the S.O.U.L. S.Y.S.T.E.M. alongside Michelle Visage and Cindy Mizelle when they recorded "It's Gonna Be A Lovely Day" in 1992 and as the featured vocalist on José Nunez's 1998 hit "In My Life" (and the number nine follow up "Hold On" in 1999).

In 1997, Lambertis appeared on the self-titled Karma to Burn album providing additional vocals on "Bobbi, Bobbi, Bobbi – I'm Not God".

She also provided vocals to "Big Love," a number-one U.S. dance hit for Pete Heller, in 1999.

While she has continued to record and release singles under her own name throughout her career, to date, she has yet to release a full-length solo album.

== Personal life ==
Octavia also has two daughters.

== See also ==
- List of number-one dance hits (United States)
- List of artists who reached number one on the US Dance chart
