= Wiggle It (2 in a Room song) =

1990 single by 2 in a Room

Single by 2 in a Room

from the album Wiggle It
- Released: 1990
- Genre: Hip house
- Length: 7:39 (album version); 4:07 (radio edit)
- Label: Cutting; Charisma
- Songwriters: George Morel; Rafael Vargas
- Producer: George Morel

2 in a Room singles chronology
"Do What You Want" (1990)	"Wiggle It" (1990)	"She Got Me Going Crazy" (1991)

Music video
- "Wiggle It" on YouTube

"Wiggle It" is a song by American music duo 2 in a Room, released in 1990 by Cutting and Charisma Records as the second single from their second album, Wiggle It (1990). It is written by George Morel and Rafael Vargas, and produced by Morel. The song became the act's biggest hit in the United States and abroad, peaking at number one in Canada, number three in the United Kingdom, and number 15 in the United States.

== Critical reception ==
Alex Henderson from AllMusic commented, "Hardcore rappers may have dismissed Wiggle It's hit title song as commercial frivolity, but there's no denying just how infectious the house-influenced jam is." Bill Coleman from Billboard magazine remarked that this "deep-baked hip-house sports a muscular bassline and well-phrased rhymes." James Hamilton from Music Week described it as "jauntily lurching hip house".

== Chart performance ==
The single reached the number-one position on the US Billboard Dance Club Play and 12-inch Singles Sales charts, as well as number 15 on the Billboard Hot 100 in 1990. It also reached number two in Luxembourg and number three in the United Kingdom, Ireland and Australia. The single earned a gold certification in Australia and the US and a silver certification in the UK.

== Track listing ==
- 12-inch vinyl (US)

A1. "Wiggle It" (the club mix) (7:39)
A2. "Wiggle It" (the dub mix) (5:50)
B1. "Wiggle It" (Def Wiggle mix) (9:25)
B2. "Wiggle It" (Def Wiggle dub) (5:45)

== Charts ==
=== Weekly charts ===
Weekly chart performance for "Wiggle It"
Chart (1990–1991)	Peak position
Australia (ARIA)	3
Austria (Ö3 Austria Top 40)	30
Belgium (Ultratop 50 Flanders)	39
Canada Retail Singles (The Record)	1
Canada Top Singles (RPM)	55
Canada Dance/Urban (RPM)	1
Europe (Eurochart Hot 100)	8
Finland (Suomen virallinen lista)	19
Germany (GfK)	17
Ireland (IRMA)	3
Luxembourg (Radio Luxembourg)	2
Netherlands (Dutch Top 40)	25
Netherlands (Single Top 100)	24
New Zealand (Recorded Music NZ)	38
Switzerland (Schweizer Hitparade)	14
UK Singles (Official Charts)	3
UK Airplay (Music Week)	19
UK Dance (Music Week)	3
US Billboard Hot 100	15
US 12-inch Singles Sales (Billboard)	1
US Dance Club Play (Billboard)	1
US Cash Box Top 100	17

=== Year-end charts ===
1990 year-end chart performance for "Wiggle It"
Chart (1990)	Position
Canada Dance/Urban (RPM)	34
US 12-inch Singles Sales (Billboard)	43
US Dance Club Play (Billboard)	20

1991 year-end chart performance for "Wiggle It"
Chart (1991)	Position
Australia (ARIA)	33
Canada Dance/Urban (RPM)	49
UK Singles (OCC)	43
UK Club Chart (Record Mirror)	69
US 12-inch Singles Sales (Billboard)	34

=== Decade-end charts ===
Decade-end chart performance for "Wiggle It"
Chart (1990–1999)	Position
Canada (Nielsen SoundScan)	36

== Certifications ==
Certifications and sales for "Wiggle It"
Region	Certification	Certified units/sales
Australia (ARIA)	Gold	35,000^{^}
United Kingdom (BPI)	Silver	200,000^{^}
United States (RIAA)	Gold	500,000^{^}
^{^} Shipments figures based on certification alone.

== Release history ==
Release dates and formats for "Wiggle It"
Region	Date	Format(s)	Label(s)	Ref.
United States	1990	12-inch vinyl; cassette	Cutting; Charisma	
United Kingdom	January 14, 1991	7-inch vinyl; 12-inch vinyl; CD; cassette	Cutting; SBK	
Japan	February 6, 1991	Mini-CD	DJ: OSNP	

== Covers ==
In 1991, Alvin and the Chipmunks covered "Wiggle It" for their album The Chipmunks Rock the House. In 2008, Australian singer Ricki-Lee Coulter used the chorus from the song for her own version, also titled "Wiggle It," which reached number 11 on the Australian ARIA Singles Chart in September 2008, eight positions below the original version. 2 in a Room received writing credits on this single as well.
