= Fulanito =

American musical group

- Also known as: "El Hombre Más Famoso De La Tierra"
- Origin: Washington Heights, New York, U.S.
- Genres: Merengue; hip hop; dance; Latin
- Years active: 1996–present
- Labels: Cutting Records (1997–2007); Verdugo Entertainment (2008–present)
- Members: Winston de la Rosa (founder); Rafael "Dose" Vargas (founder)
- Past members: José "Pickles" Fuentes (1997–2007); Elvin Ovalles (1997–2002); Marino "Reno" Paredes (1997–2002); Wellington Belen (1999–2000); Jesús Martínez (2003–2006); Daniel Fernández (2003–2005)

Fulanito is an American musical group based in Washington Heights in New York City. The group combines traditional merengue with elements of other genres such as house, hip hop, and bachata among others. With over five million albums sold throughout the world, they were at one time the top selling act in Colombia, and were placed on other charts including those of Japan, Switzerland, United States, and Chile. Their name means "Little John Doe" (i.e. unknown) in Spanish (see Fulano + -ito). Members of Fulanito had previously been in popular groups such as 740 Boyz and 2 in a Room.

== History ==
Fulanito was formed in 1996 by Dominican-American lead singer / producer Rafael 'Dose' Vargas and producer Winston 'Win' Rosa with the idea of exploiting their blended talents into the Latin market. Vargas grew up in the Washington Heights neighborhood in Manhattan, New York, and Winston grew up in the South Bronx. They met in 1992 during a studio session where Winston was working as a recording engineer on one of Rafael's earlier projects. Their first album, “El Hombre Mas Famoso De La Tierra” gained international fame with the hit singles “Guallando”, “El Cepillo” and “La Novela,. The album sold over 500,000 units worldwide. They further gained international notoriety with their second album, “El Padrino” which garnered them their first Grammy nomination. Their third album, “Americanizao” (2001) would be the last production both Vargas and Rosa would work on together.

=== Influences ===
Fulanito's influences trace back to the early days of Tropical Latin music in New York. "Growing up in New York City during the late 70’s, and 80’s, our generation has been influenced by the sounds of classic dance music and Hip-hop, all while the classic tropical sounds waved through our ears" states Vargas. From their Latin roots, Vargas and Rosa were driven by the likes of Hector Lavoe, Willie Colón, Johnny Pacheco, Johnny Ventura, and Fernandito Villalona. Their more youthful roots go as far back as Run DMC, T La Rock, and LL Cool J, among others.

=== 2 in a Room ===
Vargas began his quest in the music business when he first collaborated on a compilation project headed by Aldo Marin and his record label Cutting Records. The compilation was to consist of various producers bring in their very own sounds in dance music. Vargas and then partner, Roger Pauletta submitted a House/Hip-hop fused track "Do What you Wanna Do", the song gain notoriety in the underground House Music industry for its unique flow of Rap mixed in with a dance-friendly House beat. The song's popularity prompted Marin to suggest that Vargas collaborate his rap style on another single from the album. Vargas would team up with DJ/producer George Morel on the international hit "Wiggle It". With the immediate success of "Wiggle It", Vargas was eventually stapled as the frontman to the group 2 in a Room, releasing the album "Wiggle It" (Cutting/Charisma, 1990).

In 1992, Vargas met Winston Rosa while Rosa was engineering one of his featured singles. Having similar music styles and influences in common, they hit it off very well, eventually teaming up and forming their production company, WinDose International. Following the success of "Wiggle It", Vargas was looking to bring in something new. With the help of Rosa, he released the album "World Party" (Cutting Records, 1994), which added the Latin element to his already popular House/Hip-Hop blend. Vargas recruited his classmate Elvin Ovalles as his lyrical partner. The first single on "World Party" was the Latin Urban club hit "El Trago", produced by the dance music DJ duo of Victor and Danny Vargas (No relation to Rafael)

=== 740 Boyz ===
The sound and popularity from "World Party" was the motivation that both Vargas and Rosa needed to build on a new sound in the ever changing Dance music circuit. With the addition of Jose "Pickles" Fuentes, their friend and local club promoter and DJ from Vargas' neighborhood, they went on to form the 740 Boyz. Their self-titled album was released in 1995, gaining a worldwide following with the international hit "Shimmy Shake". The group gained greater popularity in Europe, specifically in France. 740 Boyz was the precursor to what defined the legacy of Fulanito, where Vargas first utilized his signature high-pitched chanted choruses and rap style.

=== El Hombre Más Famoso de la Tierra (1997–1999) ===
As the popularity of the 740 Boyz began to wind down, Vargas was once again in search of a new sound and market to exploit his talents. With the growing success of many young urban Latin groups such as Proyect Uno, Ilegales and Sandy y Papo surging in South America, Vargas and Rosa were eager to tap in. Vargas was well aware of the rising success of the grassroots traditional merengue genre known as Perico Ripiao (Spanish for "shredded parrot"). Vargas found a way to keep his previous projects together by bringing Ovalles, Fuentes and adding Marino Paredes to the mix. Rosa, being very close to the genre, enlisted the talents of his father, Arcenio De La Rosa, an accomplished well-known traditional merengue artist in his own right, to add to the authenticity of the sound. They merged their hip hop styles with the sounds of merengue, as well as samba and cumbia, and released "El Hombre Mas Famoso De La Tierra" in 1997. The album gained immediate worldwide recognition selling over 500,000 units. The first single off the album, "Guallando," became a household chant, gaining song of the year honors in Colombia in 1998.

=== El Padrino (1999–2001) ===
Fulanito's second studio album, "El Padrino" (Cutting, 1999) used many of the same elements that garnered them international fame, with only minor changes to the sound and the frontline. Rosa decided to step down as one of the frontmen to concentrate on the production end. Vargas would add Welington Belen to replace Rosa. Belen, born and raised in the Dominican Republic and a student of merengue genre, was very instrumental in the production of "El Padrino". Vargas and Rosa were able to incorporate more of the authentic merengue sound while adding their American urban element with ease. The album received a Grammy nomination in 1999, and had several songs featured in John Singelton's modern day film release of Shaft.

=== Americanizao (2001–2004) ===
The release of "Americanizao" (Cutting, 2001) saw the group becoming a quartet. Belen left the group and Vargas would focus on a more urban dance feel for the album. With its hit single "Callate", hip-hop tracks "Otra Vez" and "Eight Million Ways", the sound that Fulanito producing was making waves for a change, while still staying grounded in its merengue roots with "Pecho A Pechuga", "La Tiembladera" and "El Generalissimo", a song that created slight controversy in the Dominican Republic. "El Generalissimo" was eventually prohibited from the nations airwaves just days after the album's release. Officials cited the use of the title "Generalissimo" as a certain glorification to the country's last dictator, Rafael Trujillo.

=== La Verdad (2004–2007) ===
In 2004, Fulanito had a slight change in its front staff. Vargas would replace Ovalles and Paredes, and add Jesus Martinez and Daniel Fernandez to fill in.

=== Vacanería! (2007–2009) ===
The release of "Vacanería!" saw the emergence of Rafael Vargas as he was solidifying his staple as a solo artist. Other artists and producers were invited to participate in the construction of the album to insure variety, depth and a breath of fresh air for Latin hip hop listeners everywhere. Music producers and brothers, Cristian Mendez and Cleyton Mendez, a.k.a. Guary & Cleyton, were among the contributors to the new album. The duo produced a salsa hip-hop track titled "Pa Que Sepa", properly utilizing a piece of the Roberto Ruena composition "Que Se Sepa", and also the track "Mataron El Negro", cleverly embodying a portion of the composition "El Negron Bembon", performed by legendary salsero Ismael Rivera. The first single release from the album was "Mira", which features vocals from Rhingo 'Truko' Fernandez. Truko is also featured alongside Magic Juan (former vocalist of the group Proyecto Uno) in the song "Ajena". "No Hay Otro Como Yo" features salsero Kevin Ceballo singing the hook in Spanglish. "Sabado en La Noche", a merengue-influenced reggaeton track, was produced by and features Tonny Tun Tun. Two other reggaeton songs on the album are the tracks "Contigo" and "Sigue (Oh Oh)". The Arabian-flavored club track "Culebrita" was produced by Rahdeekhal. In 2007, the album garnered Rafael his second Grammy Nomination in the best Latin Urban Urban Album category

== Discography ==
Album	Year	Label
El Hombre Más Famoso de la Tierra	1997	Cutting
El Padrino	1999	Cutting
Americanizao	2001	Cutting
La Verdad	2004	Cutting
Vacanería!	2007	Cutting
Reintroducción	2009	Verdugo Entertainment
