= Lea-Lorien =

American singer-songwriter

Lea Lorien
- Born: Lea Lorien Alomar
- Genres: R&B, Pop, Neo soul, dance
- Occupations: SInger, songwriter
- Years active: 2000-present
- Labels: Sony, Universal

Lea Lorien is an American female singer/songwriter from New York City, New York who is the daughter of guitarist Carlos Alomar and singer Robin Clark (both were performers on David Bowie's 1975 Young Americans album, which featured Alomar's guitar performance on "Fame").

She is the uncredited vocalist on David Morales' 2004 number one Billboard Hot Dance Music/Club Play song "How Would U Feel", from the 2 Worlds Collide CD, on which she performs four other tracks. The song charted at #18 on the Billboard Hot 100 in 2004. It also went on to feature in the "Episodes from Liberty City" expansions for Grand Theft Auto IV as the first track to play on the reformatted version of the Vladivostok FM radio station.

Lea Lorien's "Not Easy" appears on Independent Soul Divas released September 2008 (Lola Waxx Records (UK)). The song first appeared on Lem Springsteen's Terminal Love album on which Lea was a featured vocalist.

She is also the voice of Sunny Funny in the sequel to the original PaRappa game, PaRappa the Rapper 2 for the PlayStation 2.

== See also ==
- List of number-one dance hits (United States)
- List of artists who reached number one on the US Dance chart
