= Harry Romero =

American DJ and producer

- Origin: New York, U.S.
- Genres: Electronic, house, deep house tech house
- Occupations: DJ, record producer
- Years active: 1999–present
- Labels: Subliminal, Perfecto

Harry "Choo Choo" Romero is an American house DJ and producer.

== Career ==
Romero is linked with the label Subliminal with Erick Morillo and Jose Nuñez, with whom he also produced and remixed several tracks, as 'Constipated Monkeys', 'The Dronez' or 'Ministers De La Funk'. The trio won the Muzik Remixer of the Year award in 1999. When working alone, he also uses the pseudonyms 'HCCR' and 'Mongobonix'. Romero owns a sub-label of Subliminal called Bambossa, in which he has released six tracks, including "Tania", "What Happened", "Son of Mongo", and "Warped".

Romero has mixed several of the Subliminal Sessions series of mix albums, blending releases from the Subliminal stable with other current house tracks. His latest release was a remix of a Nick & Danny Chatelain track called "Me Resuelve". He continues to play at Subliminal session parties worldwide, including those in Pacha, Ibiza. In 2007, he set up a four-date residency throughout the year at the SE1 club in London, with the last party taking place on October 10 that year.

Romero has had two appearances under his own name in the UK Singles Chart, with "Just Can't Get Enough" (1999, #39) and "I Want Out (I Can't Believe)" (2001, #51), as well as "Hazin' and Phazin'" (2000, #21) under the name Choo Choo Project.
