= 2 in a Room =

American hip hop duo

- Rog Nice and Dose

Background information
- Origin: Washington Heights, New York City, New York
- Genres: House, hip-hop, freestyle
- Years active: 1987–1995
- Label: Cutting/Charisma/Virgin/EMI Records
- Members: Rafael "Dose" Vargas; Roger "Rog Nice" Pauletta

2 in a Room was an American hip hop, freestyle and hip house duo. The group, formed in the Washington Heights neighborhood of New York City, New York and active between 1987 and 1995, consisted of rapper Rafael "Dose" Vargas and producer/remixer Roger "Rog Nice" Pauletta.

== Musical career ==
They are best known for their 1990 hit single "Wiggle It", written and produced by George Morel and Rafael Vargas. It spent two weeks at number one on the US Hot Dance Club Play chart and number three on the UK Singles Chart,) and then crossed over to mainstream radio, and climbed to number 15 on the Billboard Hot 100, eventually becoming a gold single. In early 1991 they released the album Wiggle It that Andrew Martin in Q Magazine called intelligent, modern hot-making".

Before that, they were known for a track called "Do What You Want" (1990) that got a lot of club and DJ play in New York and Chicago. "El Trago (The Drink)" was a number 86 Billboard Hot 100 chart entry (the last of their pop hits), but they did chart several more singles on the dance chart through the 1990s. Their first release in the UK was "Somebody in the House Say Yeah!" in the late part of 1989. They later changed their name to Fulanito; and style of music to merengue. Vargas, also known under Dose Material, was also member of 740 Boyz from 1991.

== Discography ==
=== Albums ===
List of albums, with selected chart positions
Title	Album details	Peak chart positions	
Title	Album details	AUS	UK
The Album Vol. 1	Released: 1989; Format: LP, CD, cassette; Label: Cutting Records	—	—
Wiggle It	Released: 1990; Format: LP, CD, cassette; Label: Charisma	45	73
World Party	Released: 1995; Format: LP, CD, cassette; Label: Cutting Records	—	—

=== Singles ===
List of singles, with selected chart positions and certifications
Title	Year	Peak chart positions										Certifications (sales thresholds)	Album
Title	Year	US	US Dance	AUS	AUT	BEL (Fl)	FIN	GER	NLD	SWI	UK	Certifications (sales thresholds)	Album
"Somebody in the House Say Yeah!"	1989	—	—	—	—	—	—	—	—	—	66		The Album Vol. 1
"Do What You Want"	1990	—	9	120	—	—	—	—	25	—	—		The Album Vol. 1
"Take Me Away" (NED only)	1990	—	—	—	—	—	—	—	—	—	—		The Album Vol. 1
"Wiggle It"	1990	15	1	3	30	39	19	17	24	14	3	ARIA: Gold; BPI: Silver	Wiggle It
"She's Got Me Going Crazy"	1991	—	—	72	—	—	30	—	40	—	54		Wiggle It
"Body to Body" (ITA only)	1991	—	—	—	—	—	—	—	—	—	—		Wiggle It
"El Trago (The Drink)"	1994	86	36	—	—	—	—	—	—	—	34		World Party
"Ahora Es (Now Is the Time)"	1995	—	—	—	—	—	—	—	—	—	43		World Party
"Giddy-Up"	1995	—	—	—	—	—	—	—	—	—	74		World Party
"Carnival"	1996	—	24	—	—	—	—	—	—	—	—		World Party
"Get Up and Move" (SPA only)	1996	—	—	—	—	—	—	—	—	—	—		World Party
"—" denotes releases that did not chart or were not released.

== In popular culture ==
In 1991, Alvin and the Chipmunks covered "Wiggle It" for their album The Chipmunks Rock the House.

== See also ==
- List of number-one dance hits (United States)
- List of artists who reached number one on the US Dance chart
