= I Like to Move It =

1993 single by Reel 2 Real

Single by Reel 2 Real featuring The Mad Stuntman

from the album Move It!
- B-side: "Toety"
- Released: October 1993
- Genre: House; ragga; Eurodance
- Length: 3:52 (radio edit)
- Label: Strictly Rhythm
- Songwriters: Erick Morillo; Mark Quashie
- Producers: Erick Morillo; Ralphie Muniz

Reel 2 Real singles chronology
"Go on Move" (1993)	"I Like to Move It" (1993)	"Go on Move" (reissue) (1994)

Music video
- "I Like to Move It" on YouTube

"I Like to Move It" is a song by American musical project Reel 2 Real featuring vocals by Trinidadian rapper The Mad Stuntman. Released by Strictly Rhythm in October 1993 as the second single from the project's debut album, Move It! (1994), the song appeared on the US Billboard Hot 100 chart in 1994, peaking at number 89, and reached number five on the UK Singles Chart the same year. It was a number-one hit in Belgium, France, the Netherlands, and Zimbabwe. At the second International Dance Awards in 1995, it won the award for Best Tune of the Year. Its music video was directed by Craig K. McCall and filmed in New York City.

The song was adapted in a Spanish version by Dominican merengue-house duo Sandy & Papo, as "Mueve, mueve", in 1995. In 2021, it was reworked in a remix version by Tunisian DJ-producer duo, Outrage and Spanish DJ and vocalist Alejandro under the title, "Move It".

The song was heavily used on several films from the DreamWorks Madagascar franchise, of which it is first used in the 2005 film as character King Julien's theme song, played by Sacha Baron Cohen. It has since then been associated with the franchise throughout the years.

== Background and release ==
Trinidadian-born American singer-songwriter The Mad Stuntman (a.k.a. Mark Quashie) took his moniker from the 1980s action/adventure television program The Fall Guy. He was introduced to Colombian-American producer/DJ Erick Morillo by Panamanian reggae artist El General. Morillo was looking for an act to be featured on his upcoming single "Go on Move" and to ultimately join him on tour as a group. "Go on Move" peaked at number six on the US Billboard Dance Club Play chart, which began Reel 2 Real featuring The Mad Stuntman's ascent into popular mainstream music. Morillo made a new track and Quashie wrote the lyrics for it. He has said that "I Like to Move It" is an anthem song for women, telling them that they are beautiful without using any makeup, and that it took him five minutes to write the lyrics.

In studio Morillo told Quashie to go into the vocal booth and try to come up with hooks. He tried different hooks and kept on repeating the line I Like to Move It, Move It, using the deep voice, while in the verses, his regular voice is used. Morillo would take the best parts of what he was saying and created the hook. To reply on the repeated line, Morillo and Double Platinum Productions team member Kenny G. Lewis, would add the Move It! crowd chant. The verses of the song are performed in a dancehall / soca / rags style. Morillo suggested Quashie repeat and take certain parts from his lyrics and sing them repeatedly wherever he felt he wanted to do it while recording. Released in the fall of 1993, "I Like to Move It" was picked up by Positiva Records in the UK and started climbing on the charts in Australia, Canada, Europe, Southeast Africa and the US. It became the group's most commercially successful and recognizable song.

== Critical reception ==
In 2020, an editor from AllMusic stated that Reel 2 Real's "I Like to Move It" "still sounds as hot today as it did when it first came out in 1993. The pulsing synths and sirens of the song made for an instant wall shaker." Larry Flick from Billboard magazine noted that here, "Reggae beat sensibilities are woven around loose house and rave keyboards. The Mad Stuntman toasts with predictable speed, cutting through the fairly thick groove with a raspy edge. His energy transforms what could have been a laid-back record into a rousing peak-hour anthem." Caroline Sullivan from The Guardian complimented its "growly catchiness". In his weekly UK chart commentary, James Masterton wrote, "Straight from nowhere come Reel 2 Real to become the first dance act for several months to charge straight into the Top 10 without a previous hit to their name." David Hemingway from Melody Maker viewed it as "a sonic equivalent of the tango advert — equal parts irritant/wonderful pop song."

Melody Maker editor David Bennun commented, "The result is ridiculously, naggingly, excruciatingly simple, as you will have no doubt come to realise by the time it turns up on the radio for the 19th time that day and you put your boot through the dial." Another Melody Maker editor, Sarra Manning, praised the song as "god-like genius". Maria Jimenez from Music & Media remarked that the "boomin'" and "grinding scorcher is gaining much audience and radio support on this side of the ocean." Andy Beevers from Music Week gave the song a score of four out of five, adding, "Originally released by Strictly Rhythm, this inspired combination of NY house rhythms and The Mad Stuntman's ragga rhymes has been generating plenty of interest on import." Another Music Week editor, Alan Jones, complimented it as a "fierce ragga house anthem". James Hamilton from the Record Mirror Dance Update named it a "madly happy gruff ragga rapped bogle/soca-style leaper" in his weekly dance column. Gareth Grundy from Select wrote in his review of the Move It! album, "As idiot pop goes, it doesn't come more dafter — or more effective — than the title track of this album."

== Chart performance ==
"I Like to Move It" became a worldwide hit, peaking at number one on the singles chart of Flanders, France, Greece, and the Netherlands. The single entered the top 10 in Austria, Finland, Germany, Iceland, Ireland, Lithuania, Spain, Switzerland, and the United Kingdom. On the Eurochart Hot 100 and European Dance Radio charts, it peaked at numbers two and three, respectively. In the United Kingdom, "I Like to Move It" charted with no mainstream media support, giving UK label Positiva Records its first big hit. It peaked at number five on the UK Singles Chart on March 27, 1994, during its eighth week on the chart. The single spent 21 weeks in total inside the UK top 100 and also topped the Music Week Dance Singles chart as well as peaking at number four on the UK Club Chart.

Outside Europe, "I Like to Move It" peaked at number one on the Canadian RPM Dance chart and in Zimbabwe. It entered the top 10 in Australia and on the US Billboard Dance Club Play chart. On the Billboard Hot 100, the single reached number 89. In New Zealand, it was a top-20 hit, peaking at number 14. "I Like to Move It" was awarded with a gold record in Australia, France, Germany, and the Netherlands, and was certified platinum in the United Kingdom.

== Music video ==
The accompanying music video for "I Like to Move It" was directed by Craig K. McCall. Dele Fadele from NME noted that it featured "the mock-crazy ragga chatter dancing in the streets of New York City with one trouser-leg rolled up." The video received heavy rotation on MTV Europe and was A-listed on German music television channel VIVA in May 1994. Same month, it was a Box Top on British The Box, and two months later, it was B-listed by France's MCM in July 1994.

== Usage in the media ==
The song appeared in the films The Master of Disguise and Saving Silverman. The song appeared in the New York Undercover episode "If This World Were Mine" and the American Dad! episode "The Dentist's Wife".

The song has also been used in numerous advertisements and video games and was used in the video game SingStar Dance. Basshunter sampled "I Like to Move It" on his track "Saturday". CGI character Crazy Frog recorded his own version of the song as part of his debut album Crazy Hits.

=== Madagascar franchise ===
Many versions of the song have frequently been used throughout the Madagascar franchise, with many of them with lyrics changed or altered to match with each film's plot and the film's subject matter (usually replacing "sexy" with "sassy"). The first film used a version recorded by Sacha Baron Cohen as King Julien, the second film used a version by will.i.am, who played Moto Moto, and the third film used a mix-up with the original tune "Afro Circus" in the number "Afro Circus/I Like to Move It". The "I like to move it" part was sung by Baron Cohen in the film while Danny Jacobs, who voices King Julien in the spinoff TV series and games, sang it on the soundtrack; both versions alongside Chris Rock as Marty on the "afro circus" part. The original version appeared in the first and last episode of the Madagascar Netflix series All Hail King Julien and the "Afro Circus/I Like to Move It" tune was played near the start of the Madagascar spin-off film Penguins of Madagascar. Jacobs, as Julien, also sang a Christmas song called "Santa Claus Is Coming to Madagascar", a modified cover of "Santa Claus Is Coming to Town" which uses a similar beat as "I Like to Move It" in Merry Madagascar. The song was also included in the stage adaptation of the film, sung again by King Julien.

== Accolades ==
Year	Publisher	Country	Accolade	Rank
1994	MTV Europe Music Awards	Germany	"Best Dance Act"	nomination
1995	International Dance Awards	United Kingdom	"Tune of the Year"	1
2011	MTV Dance	United Kingdom	"The 100 Biggest 90's Dance Anthems of All Time"	53
2013	Vibe	United States	"Before EDM: 30 Dance Tracks from the '90s That Changed the Game"	23
2018	ThoughtCo	United States	"The Top 100 Best Party Songs of All Time"	73
2024	Billboard	United States	"The 100 Greatest Jock Jams of All Time"	92

== Track listings ==
- CD single, United States
1. "I Like to Move It" (US Radio Edit) – 3:43
2. "I Like to Move It" (Erick 'More' Club Mix) – 5:45
3. "I Like to Move It" (Reel 2 Reel Dub) – 5:00
4. "I Like to Move It" (More's Instrumental) – 4:35
5. "Toety" - 5:00
- CD maxi
1. "I Like to Move It" (UK Radio Edit) – 3:52
2. "I Like to Move It" (UK Vocal House Remix) – 5:47
3. "I Like to Move It" (UK Moody House Remix) – 5:05
4. "I Like to Move It" (Reel 2 Reel Dub) – 4:25
- CD single
1. "I Like to Move It" (Radio Edit) – 3:52
2. "I Like to Move It" (More's Instrumental) – 3:57
- CD seven-track remixes
1. "I Like to Move It" (UK Radio Edit) – 3:52
2. "I Like to Move It" (Erick 'More' Club Mix) – 5.51
3. "I Like to Move It" (UK Vocal House Remix) – 5.47
4. "I Like to Move It" (UK Moody house Remix) – 6.19
5. "I Like to Move It" (Vocal Dattiman Remix) – 6.37
6. "I Like to Move It" (UK Dattiman Dub) – 6.22
7. "I Like to Move It" (Reel 2 Reel Dub) – 4.25

== Charts ==
=== Weekly charts ===
Chart (1994)	Peak position
Australia (ARIA)	6
Austria (Ö3 Austria Top 40)	2
Belgium (Ultratop 50 Flanders)	1
Canada Retail Singles (The Record)	13
Canada Dance/Urban (RPM)	1
Denmark (IFPI)	17
Europe (Eurochart Hot 100)	2
Europe (European Dance Radio)	3
Finland (Suomen virallinen lista)	10
France (SNEP)	1
Germany (GfK)	3
Iceland (Íslenski Listinn Topp 40)	6
Ireland (IRMA)	5
Lithuania (M-1)	8
Netherlands (Dutch Top 40)	1
Netherlands (Single Top 100)	1
New Zealand (Recorded Music NZ)	14
Scottish Singles Sales (Official Charts)	8
Spain (AFYVE)	7
Sweden (Sverigetopplistan)	12
Switzerland (Schweizer Hitparade)	4
UK Singles (Official Charts)	5
UK Dance (Music Week)	1
UK Club Chart (Music Week)	4
US Billboard Hot 100	89
US Dance Club Play (Billboard)	8
US Maxi-Singles Sales (Billboard)	5
Zimbabwe (ZIMA)	1

=== Year-end charts ===
Chart (1994)	Position
Australia (ARIA)	40
Austria (Ö3 Austria Top 40)	25
Belgium (Ultratop)	13
Canada Dance/Urban (RPM)	1
Europe (Eurochart Hot 100)	11
Europe (European Dance Radio)	11
France (SNEP)	3
Germany (Media Control)	19
Iceland (Íslenski Listinn Topp 40)	99
Netherlands (Dutch Top 40)	2
Netherlands (Single Top 100)	8
Sweden (Topplistan)	41
Switzerland (Schweizer Hitparade)	47
UK Singles (OCC)	15
UK Club Chart (Music Week)	49
US Maxi-Singles Sales (Billboard)	43

=== Decade-end charts ===
Chart (1990–1999)	Rank
Netherlands (Dutch Top 40)	30

== Certifications ==
Region	Certification	Certified units/sales
Australia (ARIA)	Gold	35,000^{^}
France (SNEP)	Gold	250,000^{*}
Germany (BVMI)	Gold	250,000^{^}
Netherlands (NVPI)	Gold	50,000^{^}
New Zealand (RMNZ) will.i.am version	Platinum	30,000^{‡}
United Kingdom (BPI)	Platinum	600,000^{‡}
United Kingdom (BPI) will.i.am version	Gold	400,000^{‡}
^{*} Sales figures based on certification alone.^{^} Shipments figures based on certification alone.^{‡} Sales+streaming figures based on certification alone.

== Release history ==
Region	Date	Format(s)	Label(s)	Ref.
United States	October 1993	12-inch vinyl	Strictly Rhythm	
United Kingdom	January 31, 1994	12-inch vinyl; CD	Strictly Rhythm; Positiva	
United Kingdom	February 7, 1994	7-inch vinyl; cassette	Strictly Rhythm; Positiva	
Australia	April 18, 1994	CD	Strictly Rhythm; Positiva	
Australia	June 20, 1994	Cassette	Strictly Rhythm; Positiva	

== Other media appearances ==
The song appeared in the films The Master of Disguise and Saving Silverman. The song appeared in the American Dad! episode "The Dentist's Wife".

A reworked parody version, titled "I Like to Shake It, Shake It", was used in an April 2018 commercial for the dishwasher brand Fairy. It was posted on their official British YouTube channel, but has since been deleted.

The song has also been used in numerous other advertisements and was used in the video games SingStar Dance, the first Just Dance, Just Dance: Best Of, Just Dance: Greatest Hits, and Just Dance Kids 2014. It was featured on Just Dance 3 as a downloadable track but became unavailable for purchase following the shutdown of the Wii Shop Channel on January 30, 2019, and the removal of most DLCs from the Xbox 360 Marketplace on August 20, 2023. Basshunter sampled "I Like to Move It" on his 2010 song "Saturday".

In the second season of Norwegian reality singing competition Maskorama, based on the South Korean television series King of Mask Singer, the song was performed in episode three in November 2021. It was performed by the contestant masked as a Nisse, which later was revealed to be Abid Raja.

A new Fortnite dance emote based on the song was introduced on January 28, 2022.

In February 2023, the song was featured in a television commercial for the United States Postal Service.

It was used in the New York Undercover episode "If this world were mine" on Season 2, Episode 26 in the entry montage.

In May 2025 an a capella version was used in an AUDI advert.
