= 740 Boyz =

Dominican-American musical group

- Origin: New York City, U.S.
- Genres: Dance, hip house
- Years active: 1991–
- Members: Winston "Big Win a.k.a. Xientifico"; Joe "Teklas"

740 Boyz is a Dominican-American dance music group founded in 1991, by Winston Rosa a.k.a. Big Win from New York City.

Big Win worked with several singers including Shaggy and DJ Jazzy Jay. While working in a studio called INS Studios in New York City, he met Rafael Vargas a.k.a. Dose Material. Vargas was also in the group 2 in a Room.

Their first single, "Shimmy Shake", was successful in France (#2 in late 1995) and Belgium, while it had little success on the British, German and U.S. charts. A few months later, their second single "Bump Bump (Booty Shake)" was released; it peaked at No. 14 in France and achieved minor success in other European countries, including Belgium and the Netherlands.

In 2003, a version titled "Shake Ya Shimmy" credited to the Porn Kings vs. Flip & Fill featuring 740 Boyz reached No. 28 on the UK Singles Chart.
