= Reel 2 Real =

American electronic band

- Origin: New York City, New York, US
- Genres: Breakbeat, hip house
- Years active: 1992–1997
- Label: Strictly Rhythm
- Past members: Erick Morillo; The Mad Stuntman
- Website: https://reel2realofficial.com

Reel 2 Real was an American hip house musical project that had seven top 10 hits on the Hot Dance Music/Club Play chart in the 1990s.

== Biography ==
The duo consisted of American DJ Erick Morillo and Trinidadian rapper Mark Quashie, also known as The Mad Stuntman. The project's core member was producer and DJ Erick Morillo from New York City, who spent a portion of his childhood living in Colombia and also in Union City, New Jersey. The first release as Reel 2 Real was "The New Anthem" which spent a week at No. 1 on the US Dance Chart in 1992.

Although it peaked at No. 8 on the dance chart, Reel 2 Real is best known for the song "I Like to Move It", which featured Trinidadian toaster Mark Quashie, also known as The Mad Stuntman. The song peaked at number 89 on the Billboard Hot 100 in 1994. It was successful in Germany where it peaked at number 3 on the singles chart, in the United Kingdom, where it peaked at number 5 and in France and the Netherlands it peaked at number one. The song would later be used in 2005 animated film Madagascar and was covered by comedian Sacha Baron Cohen (who voiced King Julien in the film) but produced by Morillo, making it a hit once again in 2005 with it becoming the film series' theme song. In all, The Mad Stuntman was featured on four of Reel 2 Real's top 10 dance hits. Later singles featured Barbara Tucker, Charlotte Small and Proyecto Uno. The Reel 2 Real alias was abandoned in 1997.

Erick Morillo died of an overdose on September 1, 2020, aged 49.

== Discography ==
=== Studio albums ===
Title	Album details	Peak chart positions								Certifications
Title	Album details	AUS	AUT	FIN	GER	NED	SCO	SWI	UK	Certifications
Move It!	Released: 10 October 1994; Label: Strictly Rhythm, Positiva	135	37	29	63	71	28	42	8	UK: Gold
Are You Ready for Some More?	Released: July 1996; Label: Strictly Rhythm, Positiva	—	—	—	—	72	—	—	—	
"—" denotes items that did not chart or were not released in that territory.

=== Remix albums ===
Title	Album details
Reel 2 Remixed	Released: 1995; Label: Positiva

=== Singles ===
Year	Title	Peak chart positions										Certifications	Album
Year	Title	US	US Dance	AUS	AUT	FIN	FRA	GER	NED	SWI	UK	Certifications	Album
1992	"The New Anthem" (featuring Erick Moore)	—	1	—	—	—	—	—	—	—	—		Non-album single
1993	"Go on Move" (featuring The Mad Stuntman)	—	6	79	16	4	12	20	11	18	7		Move It!
1993	"I Like to Move It" (featuring The Mad Stuntman)	89	8	6	2	10	1	3	1	4	5	AUS: Gold; FRA: Gold; GER: Gold; NED: Gold; UK: Platinum	Move It!
1994	"Can You Feel It?" (featuring The Mad Stuntman)	—	3	114	28	7	49	32	20	31	13		Move It!
1994	"Raise Your Hands" (featuring The Mad Stuntman)	—	—	—	—	6	—	—	—	—	14		Move It!
1995	"Conway" (featuring The Mad Stuntman)	—	4	—	—	9	—	—	—	—	27		Move It!
1996	"Jazz It Up"	—	—	69	—	—	—	—	15	—	7		Are You Ready for Some More?
1996	"Are You Ready for Some More?"	—	5	137	—	—	—	—	—	—	24		Are You Ready for Some More?
1996	"Move Your Body (Mueve la Cadera)" (featuring Proyecto Uno)	—	3	193	—	—	—	—	—	—	—		Are You Ready for Some More?
2018	"Raise Your Hands (Shadow Child Update)" (featuring The Mad Stuntman)	—	—	—	—	—	—	—	—	—	—		
"—" denotes items that did not chart or were not released in that territory.

== See also ==
- List of Billboard number-one dance club songs
- List of artists who reached number one on the U.S. Dance Club Songs chart
