= Dajae =

American R&B singer

Karen Gordon, better known by her stage name Dajae (/ˈdɑːʒeɪ/), is a female R&B and dance music singer born in Chicago, Illinois.

== Biography ==
Dajae sang in various soul bands for over a decade prior to working with house music producer Cajmere, who featured her on his 1992 single "Brighter Days", which peaked at number two for two weeks on the American dance chart. "Time", "U Got Me Up" and "Is It All Over My Face" were also hit singles. Her only album, Higher Power (1995), released on Cajual Records, followed. In 1996, her hit "Day by Day" hit No. 1 on the Hot Dance Music/Club Play chart.

She also collaborated on club hits with Barbara Tucker, Ultra Naté, Moné, Full Intention and Junior Sanchez.

== Discography ==
- Higher Power (1995)

== See also ==
- List of number-one dance hits (United States)
- List of artists who reached number one on the US Dance chart
