= Jose Nuñez (DJ) =

American electronic and house music producer

Jose Nuñez is an American electronic and house music producer. He is best known for his works with producers Erick Morillo and Harry "Choo Choo" Romero on the Subliminal record label.

== Biography ==
In 1998, he appeared in the US Billboard Hot Dance Music/Club Play chart twice, first hitting #1 with "In My Life." It peaked at #56 in the UK Singles Chart in September that year. The follow-up "Hold On" peaked at #9 US Dance later that year, and at #44 in the UK chart. Lead vocals on both tracks were by singer Octahvia, sometimes referred to as Octavia or Octah'via, and the songs were officially credited to "Jose Nuñez featuring Octahvia". Jose then started collaborating with Erick Morillo and Harry Romero. The 3 remixed and made many songs under monikers such as Da Mob, The Dronez and Ministers-De-La-Funk. Nunez went back to his solo stuff a few years later. He came back on the scene in 2002 with his latest production named "Air Race", which was based on the song My Own Way by Duran Duran. It became very successful in the clubs, resulting into an airplay hit. Two years later, he released "Bilingual", his most popular song to this day, which features the singer Taina.

With fellow producer, Harry Choo Choo Romero, Nunez had another Top 10 dance hit "Cro-Magnon (What About Our Love)," under the moniker Constipated Monkeys. He undertook another collaboration in 2009, with DJ MYNC and Choo Choo Romero on the track, "Boogers."

== See also ==
- List of number-one dance hits (United States)
- List of artists who reached number one on the US Dance chart
- The Jersey Sound
