= Strictly Rhythm =

Record label

- Parent company: Independent (1989-2019); BMG Rights Management (2013; master recording back catalogue to date); BMG Rights Management (2015; publishing back catalogue to date); BMG Rights Management (2019; trademark, all remaining master and publishing rights)
- Founded: 1989
- Founder: Mark Finkelstein; Gladys Pizarro
- Distributors: Universal Music Group (physical); BMG Rights Management (digital)
- Genre: House music
- Country of origin: US
- Location: New York, US;
- Official website: http://www.strictly.com

Strictly Rhythm is an American house music record label.

== History ==
The label was founded on May 1, 1989, by Gladys Pizarro and Mark Finkelstein, who were both working as A&R in a label called Spring Records. Working with house music artists from the beginning, during the 1990s the label had a string of hit releases by Roger Sanchez, Todd Terry, Masters at Work, Josh Wink, Armand Van Helden and Kenny Dope, amongst others. In 1994 "I Like to Move It" by the duo Reel 2 Reel became the first of many worldwide hits for the label. By the end of the decade Strictly Rhythm's influence and notoriety began to fade, finally folding in 2002.

Strictly Rhythm relaunched in 2007 after a five-year break, following a venture with Warner Music. The label made a number of its recordings available for digital download and signed new productions from Quentin Harris, Osunlade, Chocolate Puma, Dennis Ferrer, Dirty South and Bob Sinclar. Three years later, in November 2010, the label opened a London office.

Strictly Rhythm has offices in New York and London.

In January 2013, BMG Rights Management agreed to acquire the historic Strictly Rhythm recordings catalogue and publishing rights for an undisclosed amount. In October 2015, BMG purchased the Strictly Rhythm publishing catalogue outright.

== Notable artists ==
- Todd Terry
- DJ Pierre
- Planet Soul
- George Morel
- Armand Van Helden
- Crystal Waters
- Michael Moog
- Roland Clark
- Barbara Tucker
- Little Louie Vega
- Kenny Dope
- Inaya Day
- Aly-Us
- Duane Harden
- David Morales
- Colonel Abrams
- Mood II Swing
