= Erick Morillo =

American DJ and producer (1971–2020)

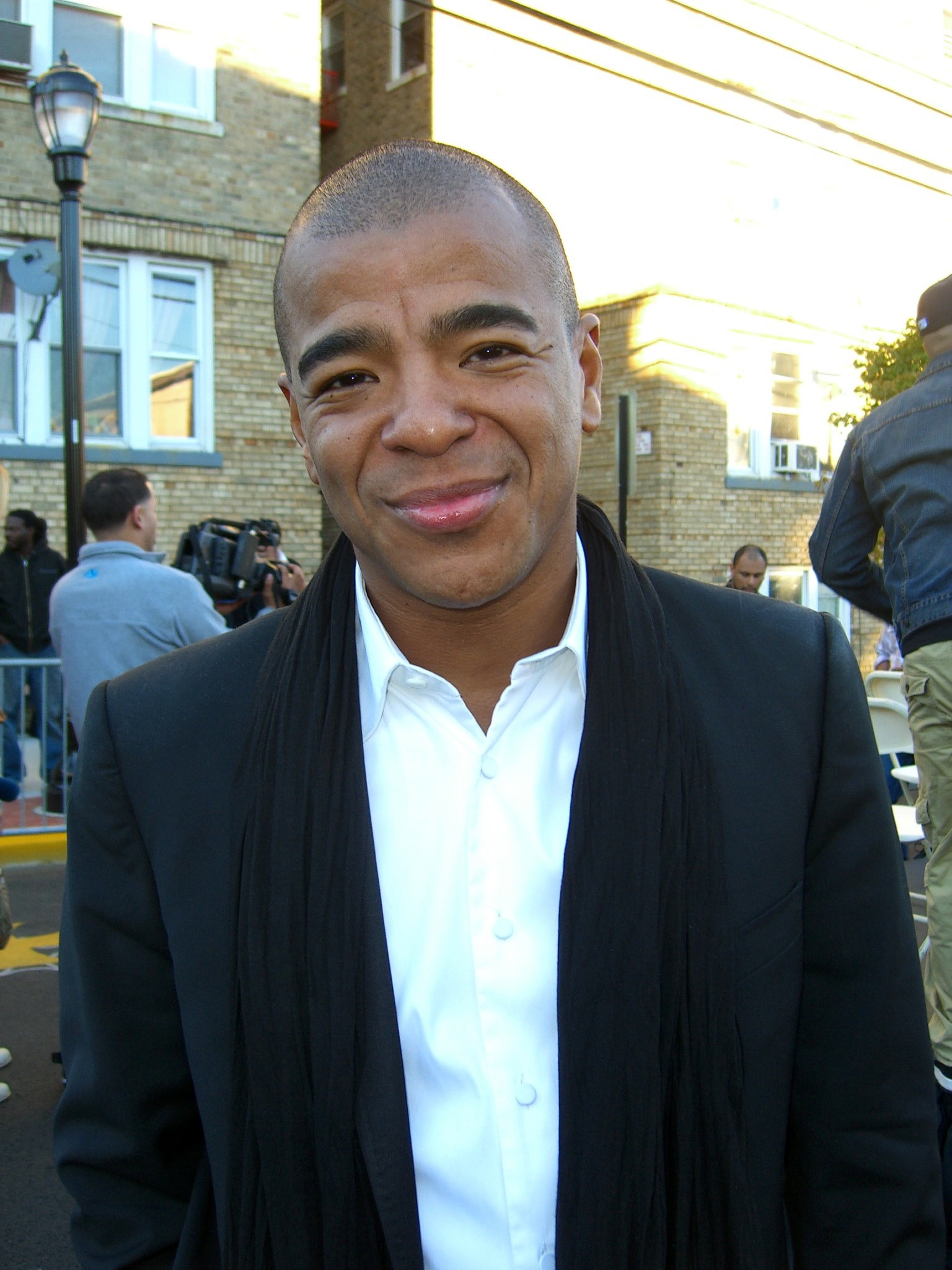
- Morillo in 2012

Background information
- Also known as: Ministers de la Funk, the Dronez, RAW, Smooth Touch, RBM, Deep Soul, Club Ultimate, Li'l Mo Ying Yang
- Born: March 26, 1971; New York City, U.S.
- Died: September 1, 2020 (aged 49) Miami Beach, Florida, U.S.
- Genres: House, electro house
- Occupations: Disc jockey, producer
- Years active: 1982–2020
- Labels: Strictly Rhythm, Subliminal Records
- Website: erickmorillo.com

Erick Morillo (March 26, 1971 – September 1, 2020) was an American house DJ, producer, and record label owner. He produced under a number of pseudonyms, including Ministers de la Funk, the Dronez, RAW, Smooth Touch, RBM, Deep Soul, Club Ultimate, and Li'l Mo Ying Yang.

Morillo was best known for his international work in house music, in particular for the label Strictly Rhythm, and the 1993 hit "I Like to Move It", which he produced under the pseudonym Reel 2 Real, and which was featured in commercials, movies, and ringtones. His label Subliminal Records produced the number-one Billboard Hot Dance Music/Club Play hit "Fun" by Da Mob, and won the Muzik magazine "Remixer of the Year" award in 1999. Subliminal also brought attention to artists like Eddie Thoneick, Carl Kennedy, and DJ DLG. He was a three-time winner of DJ Awards "Best House DJ" in 1998, 2001, and 2003 and a three-time winner of "Best International DJ" in 2002, 2006, and 2009 receiving a total of 15 nominations in all from 1998 to 2010.

Morillo died from a drug overdose at his home in Miami Beach, three days before he was due to appear in court to face rape charges.

== Early life ==
Erick Morillo was born in 1971 in New York. He spent most of his pre-teen years in Cartagena, Colombia, where he lived with his family, and grew accustomed to salsa and merengue music. He moved back to the United States at age 11, living with his mother, Elisa, and sister, Sheila, in an apartment at 1406 Bergenline Avenue in Union City, New Jersey. Influenced by other genres such as reggae, and hip hop, it was also at age 11 that he began DJing weddings for friends and family. He attended grammar school at Saint Joseph and Michael's School, a private Catholic school, graduating in 1985. He graduated from Emerson High School in Union City in 1989.

== Career ==
=== "Muevelo" and "I Like to Move It" ===
Morillo took a studio engineering course at the New York City's Center for the Media Arts, and began DJing at local clubs, in places like the Love Sexy music lounge on Hudson Street in Hoboken. While working at a club in nearby Weehawken, Morillo met Latin reggae star El General, whom he befriended. The two collaborated in 1991 on the single, "Muevelo", a mixture of reggae, house music, and a sample of T99's techno single "Anasthasia" that became a surprise hit, and went platinum.

As his remixes became familiar in Latin clubs, Morillo branched out through his friendship with New York house veteran "Little" Louie Vega, whom he met through then-unknown singer Marc Anthony, with whom Vega had worked on the seminal 1992 house anthem, "Ride on the Rhythm". According to Morillo, Vega advised him to "focus on vocals". Morillo's next big song came in 1993, when New York's premier house label at the time, Strictly Rhythm, released his "The New Anthem"/"Funky Buddha" 12. The song did well in the charts and in clubs, garnering attention for Morillo. Later that year, Strictly Rhythm released the Reel 2 Real's second single "I Like to Move It". The song, which has been described by Mixer as "part Euro-cheese, part pop A&R man's wet dream", became a staple international dance hit for both Reel 2 Real and Strictly Rhythm. It made Morillo a millionaire and thrust him into a globe-trotting life that included weekly trips to Europe to tape MTV Europe in between stateside promotions. In response to the song's success, Morillo recorded the full-length album Move It!, which was released in 1994, and spawned several singles that did particularly well in England. This was followed by a 1996 album from which several other singles were released, most notably "Mueve la Cadera" ("Move Your Body").

=== From Reel 2 Real to Subliminal ===
Despite being believed to have made over $2 million from Reel 2 Real, Morillo feared that his financial success may have hurt both his creative drive and his street credibility. Wanting to create respectable house music, he produced "Jazz It Up", launching it under the label of the Erick Morillo Project, in order to ensure street credibility. The song did well, and boosted his confidence. He and Louie Vega collaborated as Lil' Mo' Ying Yang and released the 1995 single "Reach". Morillo intended a third album for Reel to Real, but his relationship with the Mad Stuntman soured, which derailed the project. Searching for a way to reinvent himself, Morillo attended The Forum, a self-help seminar in New York City, where he gained insight into finding happiness through things other than wealth and his frantic work schedule. The seminar also enabled him to escape his creative rut by helping him analyze his past and set future goals, one of which was to become a successful global DJ. He abandoned the Reel 2 Real alias in 1996, and concentrated on DJing, becoming a favorite in Ibiza, Europe and Australia.

Finishing his relationship with Strictly Rhythm, Morillo took the advice of Strictly Rhythm owner Mark Finkelstein, whom Morillo calls "a fair person and a business mentor", and decided to distance himself from R2R's pop past. In 1997, he partnered with Christina Pazzanese, who worked with DJ Sneak, Junior Sanchez, Josh Wink and Armand van Helden at X-Mix, and together, they launched Subliminal Records and Subliminal Management. Pazzanese, who came up with the subliminal name, directed both the label and the management companies while Morillo oversaw A&R and rebuilt his image. DJ Sneak and Jr. Sanchez came over with Pazzanese, joining Morillo's friends, DJ/producers José Nunez and Harry Choo Choo Romero. Morillo described Subliminal's sound as "ghetto music", branded with European-designed record sleeves, "but with class". Its first single was 1998's "Fun", which featured Chicago diva Dajae, and drew positive response via test pressings and buzz across the Atlantic. However, Dajae refused to sign the contract with Subliminal, so vocalist Jocelyn Brown was hired to re-record the vocals. Brown's collaboration with Subliminal is known as "Da Mob", and their version of "Fun" became a number one Billboard Hot Dance Music/Club Play hit. Eventually, DJ Sneak left with Pazzanese in 1998 for her firm, Tight Artist Management, in New York City. Junior Sanchez also left Subliminal management in late 1998. The remaining trio of Morillo, Romero and Nunez are also known as the remix team the Dronez. With Subliminal, Morillo achieved financial success. The trio won Muzik magazine's Remixer of the Year award in 1999.

=== Club nights ===
In late 1999, Morillo completed a U.S. tour. His club night "Subliminal Night" in New York City featured Danny Tenaglia, Darren Emerson, Bob Sinclar, Derrick Carter, Tiger Tim Stevens, Mark Farina and Tony Humphries in guest spots. Morillo has also hosted various other club nights across the globe, such as his mid-week Subliminal Sessions parties at Champs in New York. When they were evicted from that venue, the Sessions relaunched at Centro-Fly. Commenting on his socializing with promoters, Morillo says:

I party with the promoters I play for. A lot of DJs don't like to do that; they play the party, go back to the hotel and then get ready to go home. Not me. I don't deny it! For me a DJ is someone who brings a vibe. If you don't party, then how do you bring that vibe?

Morillo hosted various other club nights across the globe, such as the annual Crobar party in Miami (ULTRA), and his legendary Subliminal Sessions parties at Pacha in Ibiza, which was named "Best International Club" of 2002 and "Best Ibiza Party" of 2001 by Muzik magazine. Ibiza is also where Morillo was crowned "Best International DJ" in 2002 and "Best House DJ" in 1999 and 2001 at the Pacha Ibiza awards. He has been known to play up to 30 jobs a month in locations including Greece, Malta, Amsterdam, London, Madrid, Belfast, and Russia. According to Morillo, his most memorable job was on Ibiza's White Isle after the September 11 attacks: "I was playing the closing party of the Space Terrace straight after September 11th. I ended the night with Frank Sinatra's 'New York, New York'. People were crying and waving American flags, everybody was singing. It's my most emotional memory as a DJ."

In addition to his MTV UK appearances, Morillo hosted MTV Ibiza for two years, presented the UK's Dancestar Awards, and starred in a seven-part Channel 4 series documenting his world travels as a party DJ. He has also worked on short films with actor Mark Alex Hanna.

In 2004, he released his first album under his real name, My World, which features collaborations with such artists as Sean "Diddy" Combs, who collaborated with Morillo on three tracks, including the dancefloor hit "Dance I Said". The label has also spawned other labels, such as Sondos, Subliminal Soul, Bambossa and SUBUSA. The label was distributed by Strictly Rhythm until that label ceased operations in 2002. Today, Subliminal is independently distributed, although Strictly Rhythm reopened its doors in 2007.

Morillo drew attention in June 2013 when he failed to appear at a June 6 show in Long Island, and then on June 12 when he had to be escorted off stage 45 minutes into a set, due to "erratic behavior." According to reports, Morillo appeared to be dazed when he began his set, and his condition worsened after he began it. At one point, he vanished from view, leaving a single loop playing over and over. Morillo later stated on his Twitter page, "The time has come to take a break and refocus my attention on my health and well-being."

== Awards and accolades ==
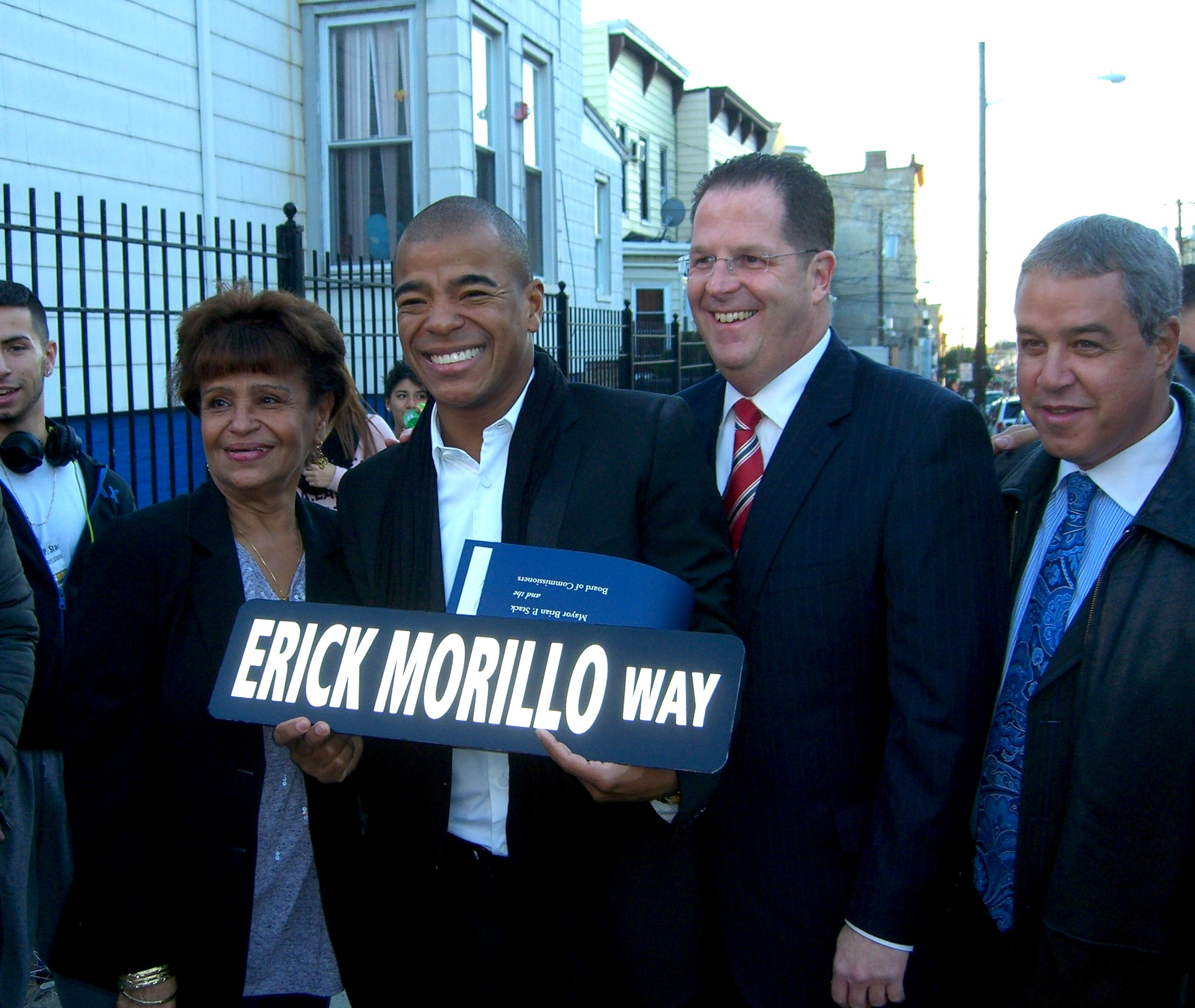
Morillo and his mother, Elisa, at the October 11, 2012, ceremony in Union City, New Jersey, in which the portion of Bergenline Avenue on which he grew up was dedicated in his honor. To the right of Morillo are Mayor Brian P. Stack and Commissioner Lucio P. Fernandez.

On October 11, 2012, Morillo's former home town of Union City, New Jersey honored him in a ceremony in which the portion of Bergenline Avenue between 14th and 15th Street, where Morillo lived as a youth, was dedicated "Erick Morillo Way". Union City Mayor Brian P. Stack praised Morillo, who donated 100 Nook tablets to a local school, by commenting, "It's important to recognize those in the community who contribute to our hometown," Union City Mayor Brian Stack said. "We can all be proud to call Erick a part of our community."

== Sexual assault accusations ==
On August 6, 2020, Morillo was arrested and charged with sexual battery upon a woman. In December 2019, Morillo and his accuser were working as DJs at a private party on Star Island in Miami Beach, and later went to his Miami Beach home. She told detectives that she got drunk and passed out alone in a bedroom, later waking nude with him standing beside her, also nude. A rape kit test performed on the woman tested positive for Morillo's DNA. Morillo denied the accusation, but turned himself in to police on the advice of his attorney on August 6, 2020. He was due to appear in court on September 4, but was found dead at his home on September 1.

Shortly after his death, nine additional women came forward with accusations of rape or sexual assault by Morillo. The accusations spanned 27 years, the majority of his working career. The victims included dancers, record company workers, journalists, camera crew and DJs and frequently involved involuntary administration of drugs. At least one victim left the music industry after working with Morillo and another was admitted to hospital after "a catalogue of both emotional and physical abuse".

== Death ==
Morillo was found dead at his home on La Gorce Drive in Miami Beach, Florida, on September 1, 2020. The cause of his death was not immediately known, but Miami police spokesman Ernesto Rodriguez said there were no apparent signs of foul play.

According to a preliminary report released on October 13, 2020, by the Miami-Dade County Medical Examiner, Morillo died accidentally of "acute ketamine toxicity", with MDMA and cocaine use listed as contributing factors. The final autopsy report concluded his death was an accident due to "acute ketamine toxicity", while also listing possible COVID-19 infection in the weeks before his death.

== Awards ==
=== DJ Awards ===
Morillo won the DJ Award for "Best International DJ Award" three times, the "Best House DJ Award" three times, and received a total of 15 nominations.

Year	Nominee / work	Award	Result
1998	Erick Morillo	Best House/Garage DJ	Won
2000	Erick Morillo	Best House DJ	Nominated
2001	Erick Morillo	Best House DJ	Won
2002	Erick Morillo	Best International DJ	Won
2002	Erick Morillo	Best House DJ	Nominated
2003	Erick Morillo	Best House DJ	Won
2004	Erick Morillo	Best House DJ	Nominated
2005	Erick Morillo	Best International DJ	Won
2006	Erick Morillo	Best International DJ	Won
2006	Erick Morillo	Best House DJ	Nominated
2007	Erick Morillo	Best House DJ	Nominated
2008	Erick Morillo	Best International DJ	Nominated
2009	Erick Morillo	Best International DJ	Nominated
2010	Erick Morillo	Best House DJ	Nominated
2011	Erick Morillo	Best House DJ	Nominated

=== International Dance Music Awards ===
At the annual Winter Music Conference, Morillo won the "Best American DJ award (2005) and he has been nominated 10 times overall.

Selected awards
Year	Award	Nominated work	Category	Result
2002	IDMA	Erick Morillo	Best American DJ	Nominated
2003	IDMA	Erick Morillo	Best American DJ	Nominated
2004	IDMA	Erick Morillo	Best American DJ	Nominated
2005	IDMA	Erick Morillo	Best American DJ	Won
2005	IDMA	Erick Morillo	Best Full Length Mix CD Subliminal	Nominated
2006	IDMA	Erick Morillo	Best American DJ	Nominated
2006	IDMA	Erick Morillo	Best Global DJ	Nominated
2008	IDMA	Erick Morillo	Best American DJ	Nominated
2009	IDMA	Erick Morillo	Best American DJ	Nominated
2010	IDMA	Erick Morillo	Best American DJ	Nominated

=== Muzik Awards ===
Muzik was a UK dance music magazine published by IPC Media from June 1995 to August 2003.

Year	Nominee / work	Award	Result
1999	Erick Morillo	Re-mixer of the Year	Won

== See also ==
- List of number-one dance hits (United States)
- List of artists who reached number one on the US Dance chart
- The Jersey Sound
