= The Best of Crystal Waters =

Greatest hits album by Crystal Waters
- Released: August 11, 1998
- Genres: Pop; urban; dance
- Labels: Universal; Polygram

Crystal Waters chronology
Crystal Waters (1997)	The Best of Crystal Waters (1998)	Gypsy Woman - The Collection (2001)

The Best of Crystal Waters is the first official compilation of Crystal Waters's music output. It was released on August 11, 1998, on Universal/Polygram. It includes most of the singles taken from her three full-length studio releases; Surprise (1991), Storyteller (1994) and Crystal Waters (1997). Also included are the non-LP tracks "The Boy from Ipanema" (an international single taken from the various artists Red Hot + Rio compilation) and "In De Ghetto" (a 1996 re-release of a 1994 Bad Yard Club single featuring then-new additional vocal contributions by Crystal Waters).

Controversially, The Best of Crystal Waters release features all but one of the singles in original LP version form instead of the often dramatically different single remixes. Minor hits "Surprise" and "Relax" suffer most from this oversight, but this also affects all three of her Billboard Hot 100 Top 40 hit singles ("Gypsy Woman", "100% Pure Love" and "Say... If You Feel Alright") which were radio and video hits with alternate edited and subtly remixed versions not included on this compilation.

In Brazil this compilation includes "Love I Found" and "Twisted", and "Gypsy Woman" ('98 Remix) is not a hidden track.

== Track listing ==
=== International edition ===
1. "Gypsy Woman" (Radio Mix) – 3:48
2. "100% Pure Love" (Storyteller LP version) – 4:38
3. "Say... If You Feel Alright" (Crystal Waters LP version) – 3:55
4. "In de Ghetto" (1996 Radio Mix) – 3:26
5. "Makin' Happy" (Hurley's Happy House 12") – 6:20
6. "Ghetto Day" (Storyteller LP version) – 3:30
7. "Just a Freak" (Crystal Waters LP version) – 4:11
8. "Spin Me" (Crystal Waters LP version) – 4:33
9. "Relax" (Storyteller LP version) – 3:26
10. "Surprise" (Surprise LP version) – 4:21
11. "The Boy from Ipanema" (Red Hot + Rio LP version) – 4:20
12. "Gypsy Woman" (Strip to the Bone Mix) 7:29
13. "Gypsy Woman" (1998 Remix)
- There is a hidden track that plays after a few seconds of silence, at the 8:28 marker of track 12.

=== Brazilian edition ===
1. "Gypsy Woman" (Radio Mix)
2. "100% Pure Love"
3. "Say... If You Feel Alright"
4. "In de Ghetto" (1996 Radio Mix; Bad Yard Club featuring Crystal Waters)
5. "Makin' Happy" (Hurley's Happy House 12") - mistakenly listed on CD as Hurley's Happy House 7"
6. "Ghetto Day"
7. "Just a Freak" (featuring Dennis Rodman)
8. "Spin Me"
9. "Relax"
10. "Surprise"
11. "Love I Found" (Crystal Waters LP version)
12. "Twisted" (Surprised LP Version)
13. "The Boy from Ipanema"
14. "Gypsy Woman (She's Homeless)" (Strip to the Bone Mix)
15. "Gypsy Woman (She's Homeless)" (1998 Remix)
