= Arnaud Caffa =

French ice dancer (born 1998)

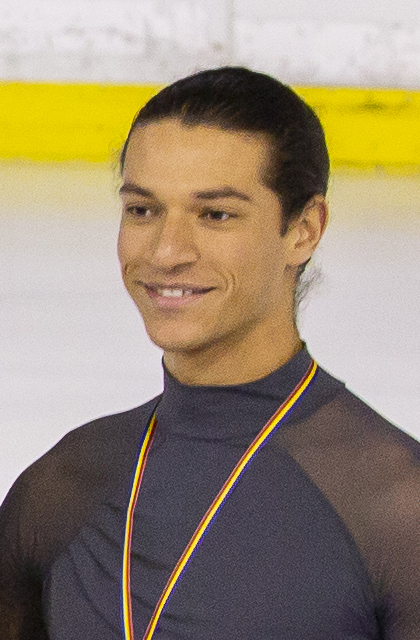
- Caffa at the 2019 Open d'Andorra

Personal information
- Born: 20 October 1998 (age 28) Les Lilas, France
- Home town: Paris, France
- Height: 1.87 m (6 ft 1 1/2 in)

Figure skating career
- Country: France
- Discipline: Ice dance
- Partner: Natacha Lagouge (since 2019); Maia Iannetta (2017–18); Justine Scache (2014–17)
- Coach: Maurizio Margaglio; Neil Brown
- Skating club: Vitry Skating Club
- Began skating: 2010

Medal record
French Championships
Bronze medal – third place	2025 Annecy	Ice dance

Arnaud Caffa (born 20 October 1998) is a French ice dancer. With his skating partner, Natacha Lagouge, he is the 2025 French national bronze medalist, 2022 CS Ice Challenge silver medalist, 2022 International Challenge Cup champion, and 2023 World University Games bronze medalist.

== Career ==
=== Early years ===
Caffa began skating as a ten-year-old and started training in ice dancing two years later. His first partnership fell apart after three years.

His second partner was Justine Scache. The two competed in the novice category during the 2013–14 season and moved up to the junior ranks the following season. In the 2016–17 season, Scache/Caffa received an ISU Junior Grand Prix assignment and finished eleventh at the event, which took place in September 2016 in Ostrava, Czech Republic. Their partnership ended after four seasons when Scache retired from the sport.

Caffa teamed up with Canada's Maia Iannetta after a tryout in mid-May 2017 in Novi, Michigan. The two represented France in junior ice dancing at the Golden Spin of Zagreb and Ice Star.

=== Partnership with Lagouge ===
After a year of training in the United States, Caffa returned to France in June 2018. He contacted French ice dancer Natacha Lagouge soon after her first partnership ended in November 2018. After trying out together in Lyon in late November and again in Paris in December 2018, he moved to Lyon at the end of January 2019 to begin their partnership.

==== 2019–20 season ====
Lagouge/Caffa made their competitive debut in September 2019, placing tenth at the 2019 CS Ondrej Nepela Memorial in Slovakia. In November, they won bronze at the Open d'Andorra and placed sixth at the Bosphorus Cup in Turkey. They then finished sixth at the 2020 French Championships.

==== 2020–21 season ====
Many events were cancelled in the 2020–21 season due to the COVID-19 pandemic. Lagouge/Caffa competed at only one international event, the 2020 CS Nebelhorn Trophy, where they placed fourth. They were coached by Olivier Schoenfelder, Muriel Zazoui, Marien de la Asuncion, Neil Brown, and Emi Hirai in Lyon, France.

==== 2021–22 season ====
Lagouge/Caffa decided to train under Maurizio Margaglio and Neil Brown in Helsinki, Finland.

In November, they took silver at the 2021 NRW Trophy in Germany and finished tenth at the 2021 CS Warsaw Cup in Poland. They placed fifth at the French Championships in December. In February, they won gold at the International Challenge Cup in the Netherlands.

==== 2022–23 season ====
Lagouge/Caffa won silver at the Britannia Cup in August, bronze at the Trophée Métropole Nice Côte d'Azur in October, and silver at the 2022 CS Ice Challenge in November. They made their Grand Prix debut at the 2022 Grand Prix of Espoo in Finland, placing 10th.

At the 2023 French Championships, the duo would finish fourth. Selected to compete at the 2023 Winter World University Games, Lagouge/Caffa won the bronze medal. They would then end their season with another bronze medal at the 2023 Bavarian Open.

==== 2023–24 season ====
Lagouge/Caffa started the season by finishing eleventh at the 2023 CS Nebelhorn Trophy. They then won the bronze medal at the 2023 Master's de Patinage. Going on to compete at the 2023 CS Budapest Trophy and the 2023 Mezzaluna Cup, the duo finished seventh and third, respectively.

Selected to compete at the 2023 Grand Prix de France, Lagouge/Caffa finished tenth. They then finished fifth at the 2024 French Championships before closing their season with a silver medal win at the 2024 Bavarian Open.

==== 2024–25 season ====
Beginning their season at the 2024 Lombardia Trophy, Lagouge/Caffa finished in fourth place. They went on to finish fourth at the 2024 Master's de Patinage before finishing fifth at the 2024 Trophée Métropole Nice Côte d'Azur.

In early November, the team competed at the 2024 Grand Prix de France, where they finished eighth. The following month, they won bronze at the 2025 French Championships.

Selected to compete at the 2025 European Championships in Tallinn, Estonia, Lagouge/Caffa finished the event in sixteenth place overall. They then closed the season by winning the bronze medal at the 2025 International Challenge Cup.

==== 2025–26 season ====
Lagouge/Caffa opened the season by finishing fourth at the 2025 Master's de Patinage and at the 2025 CS Lombardia Trophy. They then competed at the 2025 Grand Prix de France, where they finished in ninth place.

== Programs ==
=== Ice dance with Natacha Lagouge ===
Season	Rhythm dance	Free dance	Exhibition
2025–2026	100% Pure Love; What I Need by Crystal Waters; In de Ghetto by David Morales & The Bad Yard Club ft. Crystal Waters & Delta choreo. by Laurie May	J'oublie by Milva; Yumeji's Theme (from In the Mood for Love) by Shigeru Umebayashi; J'oublie by Milva choreo. by Laurie May	Kid by Eddy de Pretto; Kid by Binou
2024–2025	Voulez-Vous; Gimme! Gimme! Gimme! (A Man After Midnight) by ABBA; Boogie Wonderland by Earth, Wind & Fire choreo. by Laurie May	HOW ARE YOU? NO REALLY by Jake Isaac ft. Joshua Luke Smith; The Ball from (Le Bal des Folles) by Asaf Avidan; Si c'etait le dernier by Diam's choreo. by Laurie May	
2023–2024	You Give Love a Bad Name; Let's Make It Baby; King of the Mountain by Bon Jovi choreo. by Massimo Scali	River by Bishop Briggs; Best Song by Daniel Caesar & H.E.R.; Never Tear Us Apart by INXS performed by Bishop Briggs choreo. by Massimo Scali	
2022–2023	Cha Cha: Suavemente by Paul Cless; Rhumba: Mil Pasos by Soha; Cha Cha: Let's Get Loud by Jennifer Lopez choreo. by Laurie May	Human performed by Sevdaliza; What About Us performed by Pink choreo. by Laurie May	
2021–2022	Pookie by Aya Nakamura; Partition by Beyoncé; Mi Gente by J Balvin, Willy William	Sonata in D Minor, Op. 1 No. 12 "La Follia": I. Adagio by Antonio Vivaldi	
2020–2021	Swing: Jimmy's Rap; Foxtrot: Love You I Do (from Dreamgirls)	Sposa son disprezzata (from Bajazet) by Antonio Vivaldi	
2019–2020	Swing: Jimmy's Rap; Foxtrot: Love You I Do (from Dreamgirls)	Caruso performed by Il Divo	

=== Ice dance with Justine Scache ===
Season	Short dance	Free dance
2016–2017	Proud Mary by John Fogerty	Memoirs of a Geisha by John Williams

== Competitive highlights ==
- GP – Event of the ISU Grand Prix Series
- JGP – Event of the ISU Junior Grand Prix Series
- CS – Event of the ISU Challenger Series
- TBD – Assigned
- WD – Withdrew from competition

=== Ice dance with Natacha Lagouge ===
Competition placements at senior level
Season	2019–20	2020–21	2021–22	2022–23	2023–24	2024–25	2025–26	2026–27
European Championships						16th		
French Championships	6th		5th	4th	5th	3rd	4th	
GP Finland					10th			
GP France					10th	8th	9th	
GP Skate America								10th
CS Budapest Trophy					7th			
CS Ice Challenge				2nd				
CS Lombardia Trophy				6th		4th	4th	6th
CS Nebelhorn Trophy		4th			11th			
CS Nepela Memorial	10th							
CS Tallinn Trophy							6th	
CS Trophée Métropole Nice			6th	3rd		5th		
CS Warsaw Cup			10th					
CS Trialeti Trophy								8th
Bolero Cup								3rd
Bosphorus Cup	6th							
Britannia Cup				2nd				
Challenge Cup			1st			3rd		
EDGE Cup							1st	
Master's de Patinage	5th	2nd	5th	3rd	3rd	4th	4th	3rd
Mezzaluna Cup					3rd			
NRW Trophy			2nd					
Open d'Andorra	3rd							
Santa Claus Cup						2nd		
Winter University Games				3rd				
Bavarian Open			5th	3rd	2nd			

=== Ice dance with Maia Iannetta ===
International: Junior
Event	2017–18
Golden Spin of Zagreb	8th
Ice Star	6th
National
French Championships	5th J
Master's de Patinage	4th J

=== Ice dance with Justine Scache ===
International: Junior
Event	14–15	15–16	16–17
JGP Czech Republic			11th
Denkova-Staviski Cup		4th	
GP Bratislava		2nd	
NRW Trophy			13th
Open d'Andorra	4th		
Santa Claus Cup			8th
Volvo Open Cup	11th		
National
French Championships	7th J	10th J	7th J
Master's de Patinage		7th J	6th J

== Detailed results ==
=== Ice dance with Natacha Lagouge ===
ISU personal best scores in the +5/-5 GOE System
Segment	Type	Score	Event
Total	TSS	175.02	2025 CS Tallinn Trophy
Rhythm dance	TSS	69.31	2025 CS Tallinn Trophy
Rhythm dance	TES	40.05	2024 CS Lombardia Trophy
Rhythm dance	PCS	30.53	2025 CS Tallinn Trophy
Free dance	TSS	105.71	2025 CS Tallinn Trophy
Free dance	TES	59.84	2024 CS Lombardia Trophy
Free dance	PCS	46.20	2025 CS Tallinn Trophy

Results in the 2024–25 season
Date	Event	SD		FD		Total	
Date	Event	P	Score	P	Score	P	Score
Sep 12–15, 2024	(Italy) 2024 CS Lombardia Trophy	5	68.58	3	104.94	4	173.52
Sep 26–28, 2024	(France) 2024 Master's de Patinage	4	69.13	4	100.13	4	169.26
Oct 16–20, 2024	(France) 2024 CS Trophée Métropole Nice Côte d'Azur	5	69.30	5	102.90	5	172.20
Oct 31 – Nov 3, 2024	2024 Grand Prix de France	9	65.89	7	104.10	8	169.99
Dec 20–21, 2024	(France) 2025 French Championships	3	71.83	3	111.05	3	182.88
Jan 28 – Feb 2, 2025	(Estonia) 2025 European Championships	15	65.60	16	101.49	16	167.09
Feb 13–16, 2025	(Netherlands) 2025 International Challenge Cup	3	64.81	3	100.85	3	165.66

Results in the 2025-26 season
Date	Event	RD		FD		Total	
Date	Event	P	Score	P	Score	P	Score
Aug 28-30, 2025	(France) 2025 Master's de Patinage	4	72.41	4	105.09	4	177.50
Sep 11–14, 2025	(Italy) 2025 CS Lombardia Trophy	4	66.14	4	104.20	4	170.34
Oct 17-19, 2025	2025 Grand Prix de France	8	68.08	9	103.21	9	171.29
Nov 25-30, 2025	(Estonia) 2025 CS Tallinn Trophy	6	69.31	6	105.71	6	175.02
Dec 18-20, 2025	(France) 2026 French Championships	4	73.52	5	105.22	4	178.74
Jan 27 - Feb 1, 2026	(Poland) 2026 EDGE Cup	1	75.62	1	112.70	1	188.32

Results in the 2026–27 season
Date	Event	SP		FS		Total	
Date	Event	P	Score	P	Score	P	Score
Aug 27–29, 2026	(France) 2026 Master's de Patinage	3	66.60	3	98.76	3	165.36
Sep 3–4, 2026	(United Kingdom) 2026 Bolero Cup	2	68.63	6	93.62	3	162.25
Sep 17–20, 2026	(Italy) 2026 CS Lombardia Trophy	6	64.63	7	97.43	6	162.06
Oct 1–4, 2026	(Georgia (country)) 2026 CS Trialeti Trophy	9	62.16	5	96.17	8	158.33
Nov 13–15, 2026	(United States) 2026 Skate America	10	59.92	10	88.23	10	148.15
