= Testify! (song) =

Single by HiFi Sean featuring Crystal Waters

from the album Ft.
- Released: 9 September 2016
- Recorded: 2016
- Genre: EDM; gospel house
- Length: 3:47
- Label: Plastique; Defected
- Songwriters: Crystal Waters; Sean Dickson
- Producer: Sean Dickson

Crystal Waters singles chronology
"Believe" (2016)	"Testify!" (2016)	"I Am House" (2018)

"Testify!" is a song recorded, co-written, and produced by British DJ Hifi Sean, featuring American singer and co-writer Crystal Waters, which was recorded in both London and Washington, D.C.. Taken from HiFi Sean's 2016 debut album "Ft.", the Gospel-themed single reached number one on Billboard's Dance Club Songs chart in its October 7, 2017 issue, giving Waters her eleventh chart topper, as well as the first number one for HiFi Sean.

== Track listing ==
iTunes digital download

- "Testify!" (Sandy Rivera Main Mix) – 6:01
- "Testify!" (Rhythm Masters Vocal Mix) – 6:22
- "Testify!" (OPOLOPO Remix) – 7:24
- "Testify!" (Sandy Rivera Dub) – 5:59
- "Testify!" (Superchumbo Dub) – 5:27
- "Testify!" (Luke Solomon's Body Edit) – 5:33

== Charts ==
=== Weekly charts ===
Chart (2017)	Peak position
US Dance Club Songs (Billboard)	1

=== Year-end charts ===
Chart (2017)	Position
US Dance Club Songs (Billboard)	40
