= I Am House =

Single by Crystal Waters featuring Sted-e & Hybrid Heights
- Released: February 9, 2018
- Recorded: 2017
- Length: 3:10
- Label: Dopewax Recordings
- Songwriter(s): Crystal Waters; Eddie Alcivar; Carlos Rosillo; Kenny Gonzalez
- Producer(s): Kenny Gonzalez; Eddie Alcivar; Carlos Rosillo

Crystal Waters singles chronology
"Testify" (2016)	"I Am House" (2018)

"I Am House" is a song recorded, co-written, and produced by American singer Crystal Waters featuring the American production duo Sted-e & Hybrid Heights. The House-themed single reached number one on Billboard's Dance Club Songs chart in its April 21, 2018 issue, giving Waters her twelfth number one, as well as the third for the duo, each with previous collaborations with Waters.

== Track listing ==
Digital download

1. "I Am House" (radio edit) – 3:10
2. "I Am House" (Masters at Work Radio Mix) – 3:19
3. "I Am House" (Jacob Colon Radio Edit) – 3:56
4. "I Am House" (Kidzblock Radio Mix) – 3:59
5. "I Am House" (Norty Cotto Radio Mix) – 3:42

== Charts ==
=== Weekly charts ===
Chart (2018)	Peak position
US Dance Club Songs (Billboard)	1

=== Year-end charts ===
Chart (2018)	Position
US Dance Club Songs (Billboard)	15
