= Come On Down (Crystal Waters song) =

Single by Crystal Waters
- Released: October 1, 2001
- Recorded: 2001
- Genre: House; dance-pop
- Length: 3:40
- Label: Strictly Rhythm
- Songwriter(s): Crystal Waters; Orlando Ortiz; Robert A. Israel
- Producer(s): Orlando "DJ Dome" Ortiz

Crystal Waters singles chronology
"Say... If You Feel Alright" (1997)	"Come On Down" (2001)	"Enough" (2002)

"Come On Down" is a 2001 single recorded by American singer and songwriter Crystal Waters, produced by Orlando Ortiz and co-written with Waters and Robert A. Israel.

== Association with The Price Is Right ==
The track, her first release for Strictly Rhythm Records, samples the theme song to the American game show The Price Is Right, whose music was written and produced by Israel for his in-house company Score Productions. The show's parent company Pearson Television (now part of FremantleMedia) gave its blessing to let Waters use the theme song, and as such received publishing rights and credits on the song. The single also marked the first time that lyrics were added to The Price Is Right theme song and the first song based on a television theme song (and the first to come from a game show) to reach number 1 on the Billboard Hot Dance Club Play chart the week of December 29, 2001. The song is played for the studio audience as part of a montage prior to each show taping of The Price Is Right since at least 2007 as part of the introduction of announcers Rich Fields and George Gray.

== Official versions ==
- CD maxi (US)
1. "Come On Down" (Live Element Radio Mix) – 3:40
2. "Come On Down" (The Tamperer Radio Mix) – 3:33
3. "Come On Down" (DJ Dome's Radio Mix) – 3:49
4. "Come On Down" (Live Element Extended Club Mix) – 8:18
5. "Come On Down" (Tamperer Club Mix) – 6:30
6. "Come On Down" (DJ Dome Original Mix) – 6:23
7. "Come On Down" (Just Keith Sub Dub Mix) – 7:44
8. "Come On Down" (Silent Nick Dub Mix) – 9:03
