= Ghetto Day/What I Need =

1994 single by Crystal Waters

"Ghetto Day" / "What I Need"

Single by Crystal Waters

from the album Storyteller
- Released: June 20, 1994; October 1994 ("What I Need")
- Studio: Basement Boys (Baltimore)
- Genre: Funk, hip hop ("Ghetto Day"); House ("What I Need")
- Length: 3:32 ("Ghetto Day"; album version); 3:14 ("Ghetto Day"; radio mix); 3:20 ("What I Need"; album version); 3:14 ("What I Need"; LP radio edit)
- Label: Mercury; A&M; AM PM
- Songwriters: Crystal Waters, Sean Spencer ("Ghetto Day"); Crystal Waters, Doug Smith, Richard Payton ("What I Need")
- Producer: The Basement Boys

Crystal Waters singles chronology
"100% Pure Love" (1994)	"Ghetto Day" / "What I Need" (1994)	"Relax" (1995)

Alternative cover
- Separate single release of "What I Need"

"Ghetto Day" and "What I Need" are two songs by American singer-songwriter Crystal Waters, issued as a double A-side in June 1994 as the second single from her second studio album, Storyteller (1994). It was produced by the Basement Boys and released by Mercury Records, A&M Records and A&M's division AM PM. Waters and Sean Spencer wrote "Ghetto Day", which is a funk song that contains samples from The 5th Dimension's song "Stoned Soul Picnic" and Flavor Unit's "Flavor Unit Assassination Squad". According to Spin, the track's lyrics talk about "those balmy, front-stoop, 40-swinging summer afternoons." The single's second A-side, "What I Need", is a house track written by Waters, Doug Smith and Richard Payton.

Contemporary critics complimented both songs and noted them as the album's highlights. Commercially, the joint release entered the top forty in the United Kingdom. "What I Need" was released separately in October 1994 and later became Waters' fourth single to top the US Billboard Dance Club Songs Chart. It also reached the top spot of the Bubbling Under Hot 100 and No. 82 of the Billboard Hot 100. In other media, "What I Need" was featured in the film Double Dragon (1994) and an episode of television series So You Think You Can Dance Canada.

== Compositions ==
Like the majority of songs on Storyteller (1994), both "Ghetto Day" and "What I Need" were produced, arranged and mixed by the Basement Boys, with Waters credited as their main writer. Additionally, Sean Spencer co-wrote the former track, and Doug Smith and Richard Payton co-wrote the latter.

Musically, "Ghetto Day" is a mid-tempo funk, hip hop and doo-wop track that has an "easy flow" and a "gently funky conversation" where Waters "opens up." Larry Flick of Billboard described the song as a "splash of cool retro-funk that is laced with licks" from its sampling of The 5th Dimension's "Stoned Soul Picnic". It also contains portions of Flavor Unit's 1991 track "Flavor Unit Assassination Squad". According to Jonathan Bernstein from Spin, the lyrical content of "Ghetto Day" "rhapsodizes about those balmy, front-stoop, 40-swinging summer afternoons." Charles Aaron from the same publication wrote of the lyrics: "Going home, she listens to Grandma talk to the Lord, babies scream, old men go tra-la-la, and her brother sing the praises of a 40-ounce on a sunny day."

On the other hand, "What I Need" was described as a house piece and one of the album's "jovial, upbeat" moments, where Waters performed her vocal in a "sick, tired, and simmering" manner.

== Reception ==
=== Critical reviews ===
==== "Ghetto Day" ====
Peter Galvin of The Advocate stated that "Ghetto Day" was "more listener-friendly" than the other songs on the album, with lyrics that offered "a paradisaical view of life and love in the slums, made convincing by the use of a sample from Fifth Dimension's summery 'Stoned Soul Picnic'." A reviewer from Billboard magazine called it "a languid, liquid sketch of a lazy city afternoon", and noted that "it gets the nod as [the album's] likeliest knockout contender." M.R. Martinez from Cash Box noted that she "goes for the "La Dee Da" with the optimistic “Ghetto Day", with its "tra-la-la-la" refrain." Also Fred DeUar of High Fidelity News and Record Review praised the sampling of 'Stoned Soul Picnic', stating that it was done "in the cause of better-class '90s pop." Ernest Hardy from the Los Angeles Times called "Ghetto Day" a "sugary, hip hop, doo-wop inner-city fantasy".

Andy Beevers from Music Week gave it four out of five, calling it "a breezy and funky mid-tempo song, purpose-made for radio play on a Summer afternoon." Dele Fadele from NME wrote, "The Basement Boys cook up a summery, fluffy yet dance-directed soundscape and you've got the most beguiling pop record since Shanice's "I Love Your Smile"." James Hamilton from the Record Mirror Dance Update deemed it a "radio aimed gorgeous gentle 90bpm summery hip hop soul" track. Michael Wilson from Rolling Stone viewed it as a "driving throwback" to '70s soul, where "Waters croons over a backbeat of choppy rhythm guitar and drums to evoke hot days on the streets." Spin's Charles Aaron thought it was "a more sublime sound than any arm-twisting remix", while Jonathan Bernstein described it as "languid" and one of the "noteworthy" Storyteller tracks.

==== "What I Need" ====
Ron Wynn from AllMusic declared "What I Need" one of the album's best. Billboard's Larry Flick labelled it a "floor-filler" and an "upbeat rouser." Another reviewer from the same publication thought "What I Need" was one of the hits to be had from Storyteller. Vibe magazine stated "What I Need" and "100% Pure Love", the album's first single, "ooze with giddy abandon—not to mention juicy grooves that seep deeper into the brain and body upon repeated spins." "What I Need" was claimed by Spin's Bernstein to have "xeroxed" Clivillés and Cole's 1991 single "A Deeper Love". However, he predicted that it could have been a potential successor to her previous signature hits, "Gypsy Woman" and "Makin' Happy".

=== Commercial performance ===
"Ghetto Day" and "What I Need" were released as a double A-side single on June 20, 1994. The joint release peaked at No. 40 on the UK Singles Chart and at No. 94 on the ARIA Top 100 Singles Chart. In October 1994, Mercury Records released "What I Need" separately, and later sent the track to contemporary hit radios in January 1995. It eventually gained Waters her fourth No. 1 single on the Billboard Dance Club Songs Chart of November 5, 1994. On the chart's year-end edition of 1994, it peaked at No. 42. The song also topped the Bubbling Under Hot 100 before reaching No. 82 of the Billboard Hot 100. However, the latter entry was the singer's lowest peak on the chart. "What I Need" also climbed to No. 7 on the Hot Dance Music/Maxi-Singles Sales and No. 32 on the Top 40 Airplay Rhythm-Crossover.

== Promotion and other usages ==
The music video for "Ghetto Day" marked Waters' second work with German director Marcus Nispel, following "100% Pure Love". It shows the singer performing around an African-American neighborhood, with scenes tinted in a yellow-orange tone. Pam Thomas directed the video for "What I Need", which consists of scenes of Waters shot primarily in a bathroom. BET added the clips to the channel's playlist in late August 1994 and early March 1995, respectively.

Waters performed "Ghetto Day" on the June 30, 1994, episode of British music-chart television programme Top of the Pops. "100% Pure Love" and "What I Need" were subsequently featured in the 1994 action film Double Dragon, but only the latter was included on its soundtrack album. During the fourth season of So You Think You Can Dance Canada, two contestants—JP Dubé and Geisha Chin—performed "What I Need" on its twelfth episode which aired on August 1, 2011.

== Formats and track listings ==
=== "Ghetto Day" / "What I Need" ===
- Australia, Europe and UK maxi single; international 12-inch single
1. "Ghetto Day" (Radio Mix) – 3:20
2. "What I Need" (Bad Yard Club) – 10:35
3. "What I Need" (Basement Boys Remix) – 8:45
- UK 7-inch and cassette single
1. "Ghetto Day" (Radio Mix) – 3:20
2. "What I Need" (Bad Yard Club) – 10:35

=== "What I Need" ===
- Canada maxi single
1. "What I Need" (LP Radio Edit) – 3:14
2. "What I Need" (Club Mix) – 8:16
3. "What I Need" (Hump Mix) – 4:18
4. "What I Need" (B.Y.C. Mix) – 10:35
5. "What I Need" (Erick "More" Mix) – 6:55
6. "100% Pure Love" (Erick "More" Vocal Mix) – 9:29
- France CD single
1. "What I Need" (LP Radio Edit) – 3:14
2. "What I Need" (Erick "More" Radio Edit) – 3:29
- Germany remix maxi single
1. "What I Need" (Erick "More" Mix) – 6:55
2. "100% Pure Love" (Erick "More" Vocal Mix) – 9:29
3. "Gypsy Woman (La Da Dee)" (Strip to the Bone Mix) – 7:32

- Italy and US 12-inch single
1. "What I Need" (Erick "More" Mix) – 6:55
2. "What I Need" (Erick "More" Phearce Dub) – 5:11
3. "What I Need" (Club Mix) – 8:16
4. "100% Pure Love" (Erick "More" Vocal Mix) – 9:29
- UK and US maxi single
1. "What I Need" (LP Radio Edit) – 3:14
2. "What I Need" (Erick "More" Radio Edit) – 3:29
3. "What I Need" (Radio Remix Edit) – 3:47
4. "What I Need" (B.Y.C. Radio Mix) – 3:53
- US 12-inch single
1. "What I Need" (Club Mix) – 8:16
2. "What I Need" (Hump Mix) – 4:18
3. "What I Need" (B.Y.C. Mix) – 10:35
4. "Ghetto Day" (LP Version) – 3:32
- US cassette single
1. "What I Need" (Radio Re-Mix) – 4:12
2. "Ghetto Day" (LP Version) – 3:32

== Credits ==
Credits are adapted from the liner notes of Storyteller.

Recording and management

- Recorded at Basement Boys Studios (Baltimore)
- Mastered by Herb "The Pump" Powers at The Hit Factory (New York City)
- "Ghetto Day" contains portions of "Stoned Soul Picnic", written by Laura Nyro and performed by The 5th Dimension, published by EMI Music (BMI), and "Flavor Unit Assassination Squad" by the Flavor Unit, published by Tuff City Music
- Managed by Vito Bruno for AM/PM Entertainment

Personnel for "Ghetto Day"

- Teddy Douglas – production, vocal production, arrangement, engineering, mixing
- Jay Steinhour – production, arrangement, mixing, engineering
- Crystal Waters – vocal, writing, background vocal
- Sean Spencer – writing, drums
- Eric "Moe" Rosenberg – editing
- Gerry Brown – engineering, mixing
- Brian "G" – engineering (tracking)
- Gerry E. Brown – mixing
- Gary Hudgins – keyboards
- Hoza Clowney – keyboards
- Kenny Hicks – background vocal, vocal production, vocal arrangement
- Audrey Wheeler – background vocal
- DJ Noodles – scratching
- Wayne Cooper – guitar
- P Funk Horn Section – live horns

Personnel for "What I Need"

- Teddy Douglas – production, arrangement, mixing, drums, engineering (tracking)
- Jay Steinhour – production, arrangement, mixing, drums
- Crystal Waters – vocal, writing
- Doug Smith – writing, keyboards, drums
- Richard Payton – writing, drums, keyboards
- Eric "Moe" Rosenberg – editing
- 95 North – mixing
- David Sussman – engineering
- Greg Thomas – background vocal
- Novelair Thomas – background vocal
- Greg Boyer – trombone

== Charts ==
=== Weekly charts ===
Chart (1994–95)	Peak position
Australia (ARIA)	94
Canada Dance/Urban (RPM) "What I Need"	2
Israel (Israeli Singles Chart) "What I Need"	11
Scottish Singles Sales (Official Charts)	50
UK Singles (Official Charts)	40
UK Dance (Official Charts)	23
UK Dance (Music Week)	8
UK Club Chart (Music Week)	8
US Billboard Hot 100 "What I Need"	82
US Dance Club Songs (Billboard) "What I Need"	1
US Dance Singles Sales (Billboard) "What I Need"	7
US Rhythmic Airplay (Billboard) "What I Need"	30
US Cash Box Top 100 "What I Need"	57

=== Year-end charts ===
Chart (1994)	Position
Canada Dance/Urban (RPM) "What I Need"	37
US Dance Club Songs (Billboard) "What I Need"	42

== See also ==
- List of number-one dance singles of 1994 (U.S.)
