= Crystal Waters (album) =

Studio album by Crystal Waters
- Released: June 24, 1997
- Recorded: 1996–1997
- Genres: House; funk; soul
- Length: 60:18
- Labels: Mercury; Polygram
- Producers: Basement Boys; Jimmy Jam and Terry Lewis; 95 North; Dallas Austin; Rick Nowels; George Black

Crystal Waters chronology
Storyteller (1994)	Crystal Waters (1997)	The Best of Crystal Waters (1998)

Singles from Crystal Waters
- 1. "Say... If You Feel Alright" Released: 2027-02-04; 2. "Just a Freak" Released: 1997-05-27

Professional ratings
Review scores
Source	Rating
AllMusic	2.5/5 stars
The Guardian	2/5 stars

Crystal Waters is the third studio album by singer-songwriter Crystal Waters, released on June 24, 1997, by Mercury Records/Polygram. It includes her third pop crossover hit, "Say... If You Feel Alright", produced by Jimmy Jam and Terry Lewis the song was also included in the compilation celebrating NBA's 50 years. "Just a Freak" featuring Dennis Rodman was a club hit, a music video was filmed with clips from Rodman's movie "Double Team (film)", and while not issued as a single, "Spin Me" (with background vocals by Karla Brown) which contains an interpolation of the Dead or Alive Hi-NRG classic, "You Spin Me Round (Like a Record)", is well known for having been featured on several Crystal Waters compilations. The album has sold over 100,000 copies worldwide regardless of her record label at that time "Mercury Records" going through difficult times and failing to promote their albums properly between 1997 and 1998 when Polygram was being sold to Seagram.

== Track listing ==
No.	Title	Writer(s)	Producer	Length
1.	"Momma Told Me"	(C. Waters, T. Douglas, J. Steinhour, G. Hudgins, A. Blast)	The Basement Boys	6:16
2.	"Love I Found"	(C. Waters, T. Douglas, J. Steinhour, G. Hudgins, L. Dorsey)	The Basement Boys	5:56
3.	"On My Mind (featuring New Jersey Mass Choir)"	(C. Waters, T. Douglas, J. Steinhour, G. Hudgins)	The Basement Boys	5:10
4.	"Uptown"	(Prince)	The Basement Boys	3:53
5.	"Say... If You Feel Alright"	(J. Harris III, T. Lewis, C. Waters, M. White, A. McKay, A. Willis)	Jimmy Jam & Terry Lewis	3:56
6.	"Easy"	(C. Waters, T. Douglas, J. Steinhour, Irvin Madden)	The Basement Boys	5:36
7.	"Female Intuition"	(C. Waters, R. Nowels, B. Steinberg, G. Black)	The Basement Boys, Rick Nowels, George Black	4:52
8.	"Let Go My Love"	(C. Waters, T. Douglas, J. Steinhour, G. Hudgins)	The Basement Boys	5:24
9.	"Just a Freak (featuring Dennis Rodman)"	(C. Waters, R. Payton, D. Smith)	Crystal Waters, 95 North	4:12
10.	"Body Music"	(C. Waters, D. Austin)	Dallas Austin	4:43
11.	"Spin Me"	(C. Waters, P. Burns, S. McCoy, M. Percy, T. Lever)	Crystal Waters, 95 North	4:53
12.	"Passion"	(C. Waters, T. Douglas, J. Steinhour)	The Basement Boys	5:44
13.	"Who Taught You How [International Bonus Track]"	(C. Waters, E. Kupper)	The Basement Boys	4:58
14.	"Something to Remember [Japan Only Bonus Track]"		The Basement Boys	4:02
Total length:				60:18
