= Say... If You Feel Alright =

1997 single by Crystal Waters

Single by Crystal Waters

from the album Crystal Waters
- Released: 1997
- Genre: House; dance-pop
- Label: Mercury
- Songwriters: Crystal Waters; Jimmy Jam & Terry Lewis
- Producers: Jimmy Jam & Terry Lewis

Crystal Waters singles chronology
"In de Ghetto" (1996)	"Say... If You Feel Alright" (1997)	"Come On Down" (2001)

Music video
- "Say...If You Feel Alright" on YouTube

"Say... If You Feel Alright" is a song recorded by American singer and songwriter Crystal Waters, released in 1997 by Mercury Records as the first and lead single from her third album, Crystal Waters (1997). Waters co-wrote the song with Jimmy Jam & Terry Lewis, who also produced it. It reached number 40 on the US Billboard Hot 100 and number 45 on the UK Singles Chart. It was also a top-40 hit in New Zealand. The accompanying music video for the song was directed by Academy Awards-nominated American film producer, screenwriter, cinematographer, and director Marc Smerling.

== Critical reception ==
J.D. Considine from The Baltimore Sun felt that "Say... If You Feel Alright", "with its Jimmy Jam and Terry Lewis production, is a disappointment". Larry Flick from Billboard magazine wrote, "Die-hard Waters disciples who have been getting antsy for a follow-up to her 1994 Storyteller opus should find temporary solace in this stomping anthem, lifted from the NBA at 50 compilation. That distinctive feline voice is in full bloom, as she vamps and purrs with glee over a hearty dance beat that will make peak-hour holiday parties sizzle. The song's hook is potent enough to trigger realistic hopes of an easy transition onto top 40 airwaves. Now then, about that new album, Ms. Waters ..."

Alan Jones from Music Week commented, "Crystal Waters makes a fine return to form with 'Say... If You Feel Alright', a song she co-wrote with Jimmy Jam and Terry Lewis, which uses Earth, Wind & Fire's 'September' as its inspiration. It's another of those singalong things she does so well and comes in a radio friendly, succinct edit plus more epic and harder club mixes."

== Track listings ==
- 12", US (1997)

A1. "Say... If You Feel Alright" (Can You Feel It Club Mix) – 8:12
A2. "Say... If You Feel Alright" (Can You Feel It Hard Dub Mix) – 8:08
A3. "Say... If You Feel Alright" (Jam & Lewis Club Mix) – 5:24
B1. "Say... If You Feel Alright" (X-Mix Club Mix) – 5:07
B2. "Say... If You Feel Alright" (Henry Street Dub Mix) – 6:25
B3. "Say... If You Feel Alright" (Peter Daou Club Mix) – 7:43

- CD single, UK (1997)
1. "Say... If You Feel Alright" (Jam & Lewis Radio Edit) – 3:32
2. "Say... If You Feel Alright" (Jam & Lewis Club Edit) – 4:00
3. "Say... If You Feel Alright" (95 North Club Mix) – 8:12
4. "Say... If You Feel Alright" (Jam & Lewis Club Mix) – 5:25
5. "Say... If You Feel Alright" (95 North Hard Dub Mix) – 8:06
6. "Say... If You Feel Alright" (Henry Street Dub) – 6:26
7. "Say... If You Feel Alright" (Acapella) – 3:43
- CD single, US (1997)
1. "Say... If You Feel Alright" (Jam & Lewis Radio) – 3:30
2. "Say... If You Feel Alright" (Can You Feel It Radio Mix) – 3:55
3. "Say... If You Feel Alright" (X-MIX Radio Edit) – 3:20
4. "Say... If You Feel Alright" (Johnny "D" Radio Mix) – 3:59

== Charts ==
Chart (1997)	Peak position
Australia (ARIA)	152
Canada Dance/Urban (RPM)	14
Estonia (Eesti Top 20)	2
New Zealand (Recorded Music NZ)	32
Quebec (ADISQ)	10
Scotland (OCC)	71
UK Singles (OCC)	45
UK Dance (OCC)	19
US Billboard Hot 100	40
