= The Girl from Ipanema =

Song by Antônio Carlos Jobim

Single by Stan Getz and João Gilberto

from the album Getz/Gilberto
- B-side: "Blowin' in the Wind"
- Released: March 1964
- Recorded: March 1963
- Studio: A&R Recording, New York City
- Genre: Bossa nova; jazz; samba; easy listening; lounge; cool jazz
- Length: 2:44 (radio edit); 5:24 (album version)
- Label: Verve
- Composer: Antônio Carlos Jobim
- Lyricists: Vinícius de Moraes (Portuguese lyrics); Norman Gimbel (English lyrics)
- Producer: Creed Taylor

"Garota de Ipanema" (Portuguese pronunciation: [ɡaˈɾotɐ dʒipɐ̃ˈnemɐ]), or "The Girl from Ipanema", is a Brazilian bossa nova and jazz song. It was a worldwide hit in the mid-1960s and won a Grammy for Record of the Year in 1965. It was written in 1962, with music by Antônio Carlos Jobim and Portuguese lyrics by Vinícius de Moraes, with English lyrics written later by Norman Gimbel.

The first commercial recording was in 1962 by Pery Ribeiro. The Stan Getz recording, featuring the vocal debut of Astrud Gilberto, became an international hit. This version had been shortened from the version on the album Getz/Gilberto (recorded in March 1963, released in March 1964), which had also included the Portuguese lyrics sung by Astrud's then-husband João Gilberto. In the US, the single peaked at number five on the Billboard Hot 100, and went to number one for two weeks on the Easy Listening chart. Overseas, it peaked at number 29 on the UK singles chart and charted highly throughout the world.

Numerous recordings have been used in films, sometimes as an elevator music cliché. It is believed to be the second-most-recorded pop song in history, after "Yesterday" by the Beatles. In 2000, the 1964 release by Stan Getz and Astrud Gilberto on Verve Records was inducted into the Grammy Hall of Fame. It was inducted into the Latin Grammy Hall of Fame in 2001. In 2004, it was one of 50 recordings chosen that year by the Library of Congress to be added to the National Recording Registry.

"The Girl from Ipanema"
João Gilberto and Stan Getz's "The Girl from Ipanema" from Getz/Gilberto

== History ==
The song was composed for a musical comedy titled Dirigível (Airship), then a work-in-progress by Vinicius de Moraes. The original title was "Menina que Passa" ("The Girl Who Passes By"); the first verse was different. Jobim composed the melody on his piano in his new house in Rua Barão da Torre, in Ipanema. Moraes wrote the lyrics in Petrópolis, near Rio de Janeiro, as he had done with "Chega de Saudade" ("No More Blues") six years earlier. While firmly rooted in bossa nova, "The Girl from Ipanema" includes influences from blues and Tin Pan Alley.

During a recording session in New York City with João Gilberto, Antônio Carlos Jobim, and Stan Getz, the idea of cutting an English-language version came up. Norman Gimbel wrote the English lyrics. João's wife, Astrud Gilberto, was the only one of the Brazilians who could speak English well, and was chosen to sing. Her voice, without any of the mannerisms of trained singers, proved a perfect fit for the song. She was never credited, though, nor did she receive any royalties, and was paid only $120 for her part.

The key in which the song is played has varied depending upon the origin of the recording. While the original Ribeiro version was in the key of G, most Brazilian performances use D♭, and most American versions use F. Astrud Gilberto and Getz appear as themselves and perform the song in the 1964 film Get Yourself a College Girl.

Frank Sinatra recorded the song with Jobim in 1967 for their album Francis Albert Sinatra & Antônio Carlos Jobim. Ella Fitzgerald recorded it for her two-disc set of Brazilian music Ella Abraça Jobim, released by Pablo Today in 1981. Ethel Ennis and Nat King Cole have also both recorded the song. A version by Gary Criss titled "The Girl From Ipanema / Brazilian Nights" from his album Rio De Janeiro reached number 19 in the Canadian RPM dance charts in August 1978. Eliane Elias included the song in her albums Eliane Elias Sings Jobim (1998) and Brazilian Classics (2003).

== Inspiration ==
Ipanema is a fashionable neighborhood located in the southern region of the city of Rio de Janeiro.

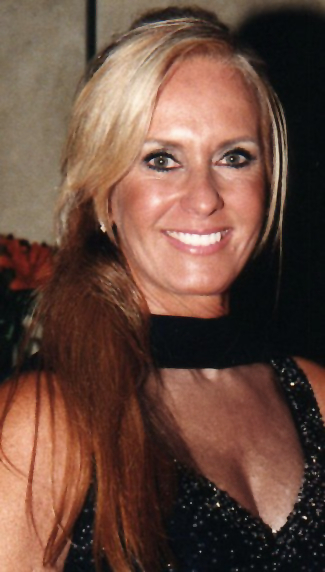
Helô Pinheiro, the inspiration for the song, in 2006

The song was inspired by Heloísa Eneida Menezes Paes Pinto (now known as Helô Pinheiro), a 17-year-old girl living on Montenegro Street in Ipanema. Every day, she would stroll past the Veloso bar-café, not just to the beach ("each day when she walks to the sea"). She would sometimes enter the bar to buy cigarettes for her mother and leave to the sound of wolf whistles. Later when they were writing the song, the composers remembered how they felt when the girl passed by the bar. She became famous after the song was released.

In Revelação: a verdadeira Garôta de Ipanema ("Revealed: The Real Girl from Ipanema"), Moraes wrote that she was "the paradigm of the young Carioca: a golden teenage girl, a mixture of flower and mermaid, full of light and grace, the sight of whom is also sad, in that she carries with her, on her route to the sea, the feeling of youth that fades, of the beauty that is not ours alone—it is a gift of life in its beautiful and melancholic constant ebb and flow."

== Legacy ==
The legacy of "The Girl from Ipanema" was acknowledged by multiple aspects of the 2016 Summer Olympics and Paralympics held in Rio de Janeiro: the Olympic and Paralympic mascots were respectively named Vinicius and Tom after the song's co-writers by a public vote, while the Olympics' opening ceremony featured a segment themed around the song and the architecture of Oscar Niemeyer. Jobim's grandson Daniel Jobim performed the song during the segment, which also featured an appearance by Brazilian supermodel Gisele Bündchen. Spotify reported that the song had been streamed on its service 40,000 times per day in the days following the ceremony (a 1200% increase), while in the U.S., the song reached number five on Billboard's World Digital Songs chart the following week.

== Charts ==
=== Weekly charts ===
Chart (1964)	Peak position
Canada RPM Top Singles	5
New Zealand (Lever Hit Parade)	8
UK	29
U.S. Billboard Hot 100	5
U.S. Billboard Adult Contemporary	1
U.S. Cash Box Top 100	5

=== Year-end charts ===
Chart (1964)	Rank
U.S. Billboard Hot 100	51
U.S. Cash Box	77

== Certifications ==
Region	Certification	Certified units/sales
Italy (FIMI)	Gold	50,000^{‡}
United Kingdom (BPI)	Silver	200,000^{‡}
^{‡} Sales+streaming figures based on certification alone.

== Legal disputes ==
In 2001, the song's copyright owners (the heirs of their composer fathers) sued Pinheiro for using the title of the song as the name of her boutique (Garota de Ipanema). In their complaint, they stated that her status as the Girl from Ipanema (Garota de Ipanema) did not entitle her to use a name that legally belonged to them. Public support was strongly in favor of Pinheiro. A press release by Jobim and Moraes, the composers, in which they had named Pinheiro as the real Girl from Ipanema was used as evidence that they had intended to bestow this title on her. The court ruled in favor of Pinheiro.

In a separate legal dispute, Astrud Gilberto sued Frito-Lay for trademark infringement for using the song in a TV advertisement for its baked potato chips. Gilberto argued that:

[A]s the result of the huge success of the 1964 recording, and her frequent subsequent performances of "Ipanema", she has become known as the Girl from Ipanema and is identified by the public with the 1964 recording. She claims as a result to have earned trademark rights in the 1964 recording, which she contends the public recognizes as a mark designating her as a singer. She contends, therefore, that Frito-Lay could not lawfully use the 1964 recording in an advertisement for its chips without her permission.

In Oliveira v. Frito-Lay Inc. (2001), her claims were rejected by the United States Court of Appeals for the Second Circuit.

== "The Boy from Ipanema" ==
"The Boy from Ipanema"
Ella Fitzgerald's version of "The Girl from Ipanema", in which the person referred to is male

When sung by female artists, the song has often been rendered as "The Boy from Ipanema". Such artists have included Julie London (1964 single), Peggy Lee (1964), Ella Fitzgerald and The Supremes (1965), Shirley Bassey (1966), and Eartha Kitt (1974). Petula Clark sang it in 1977 on The Muppet Show. Crystal Waters recorded her version in 1996 for the various artists Red Hot + Rio compilation and was later included on her 1998 greatest-hits set. Diana Krall recorded another version on her 2009 album Quiet Nights.

The reason for "The Boy from Ipanema" version is partially caused by an awkward translation occurring when female vocalists sing: "But each time when she walks to the sea, she looks straight ahead not at he." Some singers have corrected this by singing: "But each time when she goes for a swim, she looks straight ahead not at him."

A parody of the song, with different lyrics written by Stephen Sondheim, is entitled The Boy From.... Another parody is "The Girl With Emphysema" by comedian Bob Rivers.

The phrase "Boy from Ipanema" — but nothing from the song — appears in Norwegian recording artist Annie's "Anthonio". Likewise, the phrase "Girl from Ipanema" appears in The B-52's' 1985 single "Girl from Ipanema Goes to Greenland", again without any musical reference to the original song.

== See also ==
- List of number-one adult contemporary singles of 1964 (U.S.)
- List of best-selling Latin singles
