= Makin' Happy =

Single by Crystal Waters

from the album Surprise
- Released: 1991
- Genre: Deep house; neo-disco
- Length: 5:33 (album version); 6:21 (Hurley's Happy House Mix)
- Label: Mercury; A&M
- Songwriters: Neal Conway; Mark Harris; Crystal Waters
- Producer: The Basement Boys

Crystal Waters singles chronology
"Gypsy Woman" (1991)	"Makin' Happy" (1991)	"100% Pure Love" (1994)

Music video
- "Makin' Happy" on YouTube

"Makin' Happy" is a song by American singer-songwriter Crystal Waters, released in 1991 by Mercury and A&M Records as the second single from her debut studio album, Surprise (1991). It was the follow-up to Waters' hugely successful song "Gypsy Woman" and achieved moderate success in European countries. Waters co-wrote it with Neal Conway and Mark Harris, and it was produced by house music production team The Basement Boys. In the US, the song spent one week at number-one on the Billboard Dance Club Songs chart and it also reached the top of the Canadian RPM Dance/Urban chart. In the UK, the single peaked at number 18 on the UK Singles Chart.

== Critical reception ==
Alex Henderson from AllMusic complimented the song as a "highly addictive and enjoyable house/neo-disco fare". Larry Flick from Billboard magazine described it as "a frenetic and hypnotic jam". He remarked that it "maintains a similar deep house vibe [as her first single]. Waters more than proves her songwriting talent here, while her unique feline vocals will test some and delight others." Andy Kastanas from The Charlotte Observer declared it as "a housy tune that's bound to, well, make you happy, what else?" Jennifer Bowles from Chicago Sun-Times called it "a song about, well, "makin' whoopie"" and added that it's "self-explanatory - there's little stories going on in the song. It's just a fun song."

Push from Melody Maker felt it "would certainly do well as a follow-up. You might mistake it for Flowered Up's 'Take It' until the oompah-bumped house beats and Crystal's jazzy vocals weigh in. The lyrics are basically all about having sex, when, where and how you fancy." Machgiel Bakker from Music & Media called it "pop-house". An editor also commented in an album review, "Just repeat the words 'Makin' Happy' endlessly and you'll get a good flavour of 'Gypsy Woman, Part II'." James Hamilton from Music Week's RM Dance Update wrote that "the strange nasally pitched girl is less Eartha Kitt-like for her follow-up to 'Gypsy Woman', a jauntly trotting repetitive canterer with some "ooh wee ooh wee ooh" (and a guy's "so happy") instead of all the "la da dee, la dee da"." Stuart Maconie from New Musical Express named it "a spectacularly bangin' tune". Jonathan Bernstein from Spin described it as "ebullient".

== Chart performance ==
"Makin' Happy" enjoyed moderate success on the charts in both Europe and North-America. The single peaked at number one on both the US Billboard Dance Club Songs chart and the Canadian RPM Dance/Urban chart. It did also top the Billboard Dance Singles Sales chart, as well as peaking at number 58 on the Billboard Radio Songs chart and number 63 on the Billboard Hot R&B/Hip-Hop Songs chart. In Europe, "Makin' Happy" entered the top 10 in Italy (9) and was a top-20 hit in France (17), Luxembourg (13) and on the UK Singles Chart (18) in the UK. Additionally, it was a top-30 hit in Belgium (21) and Ireland (22), and a top-40 hit on the Eurochart Hot 100, peaking at number 33 in October 1991. But on the European Dance Radio Chart, it was far more successful, reaching number five.

== Track listing and formats ==
- UK 7-inch vinyl single
1. "Makin' Happy" (Hurley's Happy House Mix) – 3:49
2. "Makin' Happy" (Basement Boys Happy Club Mix) – 3:31
- UK CD maxi-single
1. "Makin' Happy" (Hurley's Happy House Mix) – 3:49
2. "Makin' Happy" (Hurley's Happy House Mix II) – 6:22
3. "Makin' Happy" (Basement Boys Happy Club Mix) – 3:31
4. "Makin' Happy" (Basement Boys Happy Club Mix II) – 7:52
- Netherlands and UK 12-inch vinyl single
1. "Makin' Happy" (Hurley's happy house mix) – 6:22
2. "Makin' Happy" (basement boys happy club mix) – 7:52
- UK CD maxi-single
1. "Makin' Happy" (Hurley's Happy House Mix 7") – 3:52
2. "Makin' Happy" (Hurley's Happy House Mix 12") – 6:24
3. "Makin' Happy" (Basement Boys Happy Club Mix 12") – 7:52
- US 12-inch vinyl maxi-single
1. "Makin' Happy" (Hurley's Happy House Mix) – 6:23
2. "Makin' Happy" (Hurley's Insane Mix) – 6:24
3. "Makin' Happy" (Basement Boys Happy Club Mix) – 7:52
4. "Makin' Happy" (Basement Boys Happy Hump) – 6:14

== Charts ==
=== Weekly charts ===
Weekly chart performance for "Makin' Happy"
Chart (1991)	Peak position
Belgium (Ultratop 50 Flanders)	21
Canada Dance/Urban (RPM)	1
Europe (Eurochart Hot 100)	33
Europe (European Dance Radio)	5
Europe (European Hit Radio)	17
France (SNEP)	17
Ireland (IRMA)	22
Israel (Israeli Singles Chart)	27
Italy (Musica e dischi)	9
Luxembourg (Radio Luxembourg)	13
Netherlands (Dutch Top 40 Tipparade)	2
Netherlands (Single Top 100)	27
Quebec (ADISQ)	20
Switzerland (Schweizer Hitparade)	22
UK Singles (Official Charts)	18
UK Airplay (Music Week)	17
UK Dance (Music Week)	9
UK Club Chart (Record Mirror)	7
US Dance Club Songs (Billboard)	1
US Dance Singles Sales (Billboard)	1
US Hot R&B/Hip-Hop Songs (Billboard)	63
US Radio Songs (Billboard)	58

=== Year-end charts ===
Annual chart rankings for "Makin' Happy"
Chart (1991)	Position
Italy (Musica e dischi)	45
UK Club Chart (Record Mirror)	85
