= Relax (Crystal Waters song) =

1995 single by Crystal Waters

Single by Crystal Waters

from the album Storyteller
- Released: 1995
- Genre: House; disco
- Length: 3:29 (LP version); 3:09 (Lorimer Vission radio mix)
- Label: Mercury
- Songwriters: Crystal Waters; David Anthony
- Producer: David Anthony

Crystal Waters singles chronology
"Ghetto Day/What I Need" (1994)	"Relax" (1995)	"In de Ghetto '96" (1996)

Music video
- "Relax" on YouTube

"Relax" is a song by American singer-songwriter Crystal Waters from her second studio album, Storyteller (1994). It was released in 1995 by Mercury Records as the fourth and last single from the album and peaked at number one on the US Billboard Dance Club Play chart. In the UK, it reached number 37. The song was written by Waters with its producer, David Anthony. The accompanying black-and-white music video was directed by German director Marcus Nispel.

== Critical reception ==
Larry Flick from Billboard magazine complimented the song as a "breezy, pop-inflected houser", and a "notable single-ready moment" from the Storyteller album. He also called it "lively" and "disco charged". M.R. Martinez from Cash Box found that tracks like "Relax" make the album "more than a dance record." James Masterton for Dotmusic deemed it "slightly formulaic and disappointing". Ross Jones from The Guardian said that Waters "delivers another of her berserkly positive electro-scat anthems, this one imploring you to kick back even when you're "mad at the world"." Chuck Campbell from Knoxville News Sentinel described it as a "thick disco song". A reviewer from Music Week gave it a rating of three out of five, describing it as "an uplifting and catchy track with those recognisable vocals that feels as though it might be equally at home on radio as in the clubs." Michael Wilson of Rolling Stone felt songs like "Relax" "are pleasant enough but don't push Waters beyond where she has been before." Jonathan Bernstein from Spin named it a "potential successor" to Waters' signature singles.

== Track listing and formats ==
- 12-inch single, US
1. "Relax" (Jazz-N-Groove club mix) – 10:13
2. "Relax" (LP version) – 3:29
3. "Relax" (Lorimer Vission mix) – 6:10
4. "Relax" (Tony B!'s mix) – 7:09
- CD single, Europe
1. "Relax" (Lorimer Vission radio edit) – 3:09
2. "Relax" (LP version) – 3:29
3. "Relax" (Lorimer Vission mix) – 6:10
4. "Relax" (Tin Tin Out Crystallized mix) – 6:51
- CD maxi, Canada
1. "Relax" (LP version) – 3:29
2. "Relax" (Lorimer Vission radio mix) – 3:09
3. "Relax" (Jazz-N-Groove club mix) – 10:13
4. "Relax" (Lorimer Vission mix) – 6:10
5. "Relax" (Tony B's mix) – 7:09

== Charts ==
Chart (1995)	Peak positions
Australia (ARIA)	133
Europe (Eurochart Hot 100)	78
Israel (Israeli Singles Chart)	26
Scottish Singles Sales (Official Charts)	46
UK Singles (Official Charts)	37
UK Dance (Official Charts)	9
US Dance Club Songs (Billboard)	1
US Dance Singles Sales (Billboard)	10

== Release history ==
Region	Date	Format(s)	Label(s)	Ref.
United States	1995	12-inch vinyl; CD; cassette	Mercury	
United Kingdom	November 13, 1995	12-inch vinyl; CD; cassette	Mercury	
