= Believe (Crystal Waters song) =

Single by Crystal Waters featuring Sted-E and Hybrid Heights
- Released: September 13, 2016
- Recorded: 2016
- Genre: Dance; house
- Length: 4:44; 3:13 (radio edit)
- Label: 418 Music
- Songwriter(s): Crystal Waters; Carlos Rosillo; Eddie Alcivar
- Producer(s): Carlos Rosillo; Eddie Alcivar

Crystal Waters singles chronology
"Synergy" (2015)	"Believe" (2016)	"Testify" (2016)

Believe is a song recorded, written, and produced by American singer Crystal Waters, featuring the production team of Sted-E and Hybrid Heights (the aliases of Eddie Alcivar and Carlos Rosillo).The single, which borrows musical elements from Bizarre Inc.'s 1993 song "I'm Gonna Get You" and Jocelyn Brown's 1985 song "Love's Gonna Get You", reached number one on Billboard's Dance Club Songs chart in its November 26, 2016 issue, giving Waters her tenth chart topper, as well as their second number one as a collaboration, following "Synergy" in 2015.

== Track listing ==
iTunes digital download

- "Believe" (Club Mix) – 4:44
- "Believe" (Original) – 3:13
- "Believe" (StoneBridge Summa Swag) – 6:24
- "Believe" (StoneBridge Pool Party Dub) – 5:24
- "Believe" (StoneBridge Summa Swag Radio Edit) – 3:15
- "Believe" (Paige Remix) – 5:54
- "Believe" (Tony Moran & Bissen Remix) – 6:05
- "Believe" (Kilø Shuhaibar Club Mix) – 5:04
- "Believe" (Kilø Shuhaibar Dirty Dub) – 6:34
- "Believe" (Kilø Shuhaibar Radio Edit) – 3:30

== Charts ==
Chart (2016)	Peak position
US Dance Club Songs (Billboard)	1
