= Surprise (Crystal Waters album) =

Studio album by Crystal Waters
- Released: June 25, 1991
- Recorded: 1990–1991
- Genre: House
- Length: 45:33
- Label: Mercury
- Producer: The Basement Boys

Crystal Waters chronology
Surprise (1991)	Storyteller (1994)

Singles from Surprise
- 1. "Gypsy Woman" Released: April 3, 1991; 2. "Makin' Happy" Released: November 10, 1991; 3. "Surprise" Released: 1991

Surprise is the debut studio album by American singer-songwriter Crystal Waters released on June 25, 1991, by Mercury Records. It includes the hit singles "Makin' Happy", "Surprise" and the top ten hit "Gypsy Woman (She's Homeless)", which peaked at number 8 on the US Billboard Hot 100, and number 2 on the UK Singles Chart.

Although the album stalled at number 197 on the US Billboard 200, it performed better in both the club/dance and urban music markets, peaking at number 65 on the Top R&B/Hip-Hop Albums chart. It also peaked at number 23 on the Top Heatseekers chart.

== Critical reception ==
Professional ratings
Review scores
Source	Rating
AllMusic	3/5 stars
Robert Christgau	(choice cut)
Entertainment Weekly	A
Los Angeles Daily News	(favorable)
Melody Maker	(mixed)
Music & Media	(favorable)
NME	5/10

Jennifer Bowles from Chicago Sun-Times wrote that Waters' debut album "sports a wide variety of characters, including a fashion-conscious homeless woman who sings "'La da dee, la da da" and battered wives who love their abusive husbands." She added, "The jazz influence on the album, most notably the song 'Twisted', can be traced to Waters' childhood." Peter Watrous from The New York Times noted that "the tension between Ms. Waters's eccentric, melodic songwriting and the streamlined, dance-floor production makes for quirky, modern music."

== Track listing ==
Surprise track listing
No.	Title	Lyrics	Length
1.	"Gypsy Woman" (Radio Mix)	Neal Conway, Crystal Waters	3:48
2.	"Surprise"	Neal Conway, Crystal Waters	4:24
3.	"Makin' Happy"	Neal Conway, Mark Harris, Crystal Waters	5:33
4.	"Small Cry"	Bert Collins, Crystal Waters	4:43
5.	"Tell Me"	Bert Collins, Crystal Waters	9:11
6.	"Good Lovin'"	Neal Conway, Crystal Waters	5:02
7.	"Twisted"	Wardell Gray, Annie Ross	2:27
8.	"Deepest of Hearts"	Crystal Waters	2:54
9.	"Gypsy Woman (She's Homeless)" (Basement Boy(s) "Strip to the Bone" Mix)	Neal Conway, Crystal Waters	7:31
Total length:			45:33

== Chart positions ==
=== Album ===
Chart performance for Surprise
Chart (1991)	Peak position
Australian Albums (ARIA)	177
Austrian Albums (Ö3 Austria)	23
Canada Top Albums/CDs (RPM)	35
Dutch Albums (Album Top 100)	81
German Albums (Offizielle Top 100)	45
Swiss Albums (Schweizer Hitparade)	24
US Billboard 200	197
US Top R&B/Hip-Hop Albums (Billboard)	65

=== Singles ===
US Chart performance for singles from Surprise
Year	Single	Chart	Peak position
1991	"Gypsy Woman (She's Homeless)"	US Hot Dance Music/Club Play	1
1991	"Gypsy Woman (She's Homeless)"	US Hot Dance Music/Maxi-Singles Sales	1
1991	"Gypsy Woman (She's Homeless)"	US Hot R&B/Hip-Hop Singles & Tracks	25
1991	"Gypsy Woman (She's Homeless)"	US Billboard Hot 100	8
1991	"Makin' Happy"	US Hot Dance Music/Club Play	1
1991	"Makin' Happy"	US Hot Dance Music/Maxi-Singles Sales	1
1991	"Makin' Happy"	US Hot R&B/Hip-Hop Singles & Tracks	63
1991	"Surprise"	US Hot Dance Music/Club Play	35
1992	"Surprise"	US Hot Dance Music/Maxi-Singles Sales	9
