= 100% Pure Love =

1994 single by Crystal Waters

Single by Crystal Waters

from the album Storyteller
- Released: April 11, 1994
- Genre: House; dance-pop
- Length: 4:40
- Label: Mercury
- Songwriters: Crystal Waters; Teddy Douglas; Thomas Davis; Jay Steinhour
- Producers: Teddy Douglas; Jay Steinhour

Crystal Waters singles chronology
| "Makin' Happy" (1991) | "100% Pure Love" (1994) | "Ghetto Day/What I Need" (1994) |

Music video
- "100% Pure Love" on YouTube

"100% Pure Love" is a song by American singer-songwriter Crystal Waters from her second studio album, Storyteller (1994). It was released on April 11, 1994, by Mercury Records as the album's lead single. The song was written by Waters with Basement Boys, who produced it, and became a worldwide hit. It reached the top 20 in Australia, Finland, the Netherlands, Switzerland, the United Kingdom, and the United States. The single is certified platinum in Australia and gold in the US. In 1995, it was awarded the prize for Top ASCAP Dance Song. The accompanying music video, directed by Marcus Nispel, was nominated for Best Dance Video at both the 1994 MTV Video Music Awards and the 1994 Billboard Music Video Awards.

== Background and release ==
The song is inspired by her relationship at the time. The singer says she chose the stylings of the song as a reaction to the popularity of gangsta rap during the mid-1990s in the United States.

Looking to write a positive song, she sent an early draft to her production team Basement Boys who "hated the hook" but "loved the verses." Originally the song was built on the lyrics "the beat goes boom" before she went back to the drawing board and considered the reasons she was writing the song in the first place. "From the back to the middle and around again, I'm going to be there 'til the end, 100% pure love" emerged in the next draft and became the lyrics in the completed version of the song.

Crystal Waters also signed and debuted as a model with the Ford Modeling Agency in August 1994. They included her as a special guest in fashion collections in both Europe and the United States. "100% Pure Love" was the theme of Ford's “Supermodel of the World" contest that year.

== Critical reception ==
Larry Flick from Billboard magazine wrote that here, the "enigmatic voice" behind the 1991 smash "Gypsy Woman" "returns with a percussive pop/dance twirler from her new Storyteller opus. Though it seemed impossible to come up with a hook as catchy as 'la-da-di, la-di-da', Waters and cohorts the Basement Boys have done exactly that, and wrapped it with dramatic strings and butt shagging cowbells." M.R. Martinez from Cash Box felt that Waters' "smokey vocals" worked best on uptempo material, like "100% Pure Love". Anderson Jones from Entertainment Weekly stated that the "hip-swaying infectious grooves" of the track "can't be denied." Bradley Stern from Idolator noted that it is "armed with a real subtle earworm of a chorus", calling it a "campy house anthem". Howard Cohen from Knight-Ridder Newspapers commented, "Waters' jazz-inflected voice merges with hard-edged house instrumentation, while the song's dark and heady synthesizer intro is a hard-to-decline signal to hit the dance floor." Chuck Campbell from Knoxville News Sentinel felt the "smoky grooved" song showed that Waters vocal is "stronger and more confident" than on her previous hit "Gypsy Woman".

In his weekly UK chart commentary, James Masterton wrote, "The lady with possibly the most unusual voice in dance music is back." He also described the song as "more of the same kind of left-field nonsense". Andy Beevers from Music Week gave it a score of four out of five, complimenting it as "an impressive comeback", stating that "boasting a strong garage production from The Basement Boys and a catchy vocal hook, this could cross over." Wendi Cermak from The Network Forty said it is "100% fierce!" Sam Steele from NME wrote, "'100' is a clubby house stomper with big beats and a huge catchy chorus. A breezy backdrop to a drunken evening in an Ibiza/Essex discotheque." Orla Swift from Record-Journal deemed it a "bright, dynamic number", that is "displaying a knack both for catchy melodies and innovative arrangements". Tim Jeffery from the Record Mirror Dance Update noted that it "features a catchy 'Back to the middle and round again' hook that should be enough to propel it into the charts." In his weekly Record Mirror dance column, James Hamilton named it a "catchily chorused jiggly chugger". Jonathan Bernstein from Spin viewed it as a "potential successor" to Waters' signature singles. Eddie B. Allen Jr. from Toledo Blade considered it the "most forceful" of the dance singles on the album.

== Chart performance ==
The single reached number 11 on the US Billboard Hot 100, number one on the Billboard Dance Club Play chart, and number 38 on the Billboard Hot R&B Singles chart. It spent a total of 45 weeks on the Billboard Hot 100 chart, becoming one of the longest-charting singles in the US. The song won a Billboard Music Award for Top-Selling Hot Dance Music Club Play Single at the 1994 Billboard Music Awards. The song was certified gold in the United States. In Europe, it entered the top 20 in Finland, the Netherlands, Switzerland, and the United Kingdom. In the UK, the single peaked at number 15 during its second week on the UK Singles Chart, on April 24. On the Music Week Dance Singles chart, it reached number one. Additionally, it was a top-30 hit in Austria and Iceland and a top-40 hit in Belgium and Germany. On the Eurochart Hot 100, "100% Pure Love" reached number 49, and it also topped the European Dance Radio Chart.

The song proved to be most popular in Australia. It first entered the ARIA Singles Chart at number 40 on June 26, 1994, then reached number three three weeks later. On July 31, the song reached its peak position of number two. It dropped to number three the next week, then spent four more weeks at that position before falling to number four on September 11. Afterwards, it remained in the chart for a further seven weeks before dropping out of the top 50 on November 6. It finished 1994 as Australia's 11th-best-selling single and has since received a platinum certification from the Australian Recording Industry Association (ARIA) for shipments exceeding 70,000 copies.

== Music video ==
The music video for "100% Pure Love" was directed by German director Marcus Nispel. The choreography was done by then-unknown Michael K. Williams. The video was nominated for Best Dance Video at the 1994 MTV Video Music Awards and for Best Clip of the Year in the category for Dance at the 1994 Billboard Music Video Awards. In Europe, it was put on "break out" rotation on MTV Europe in June 1994. One month later, the video was B-listed on France's MCM and Germany's VIVA. "100% Pure Love" was later made available remastered in HD by Vevo on YouTube in 2009, having generated more than 36 million views as of late 2025.

== Impact and legacy ==
ASCAP awarded "100% Pure Love" the prize for Top ASCAP Dance Song in 1995. Australian music channel Max included it in their list of the "1000 Greatest Songs of All Time" in 2011. Idolator ranked it one of "The 50 Best Pop Singles of 1994" in 2014. Matt Stopera and Brian Galindo of BuzzFeed ranked it number nine in their list of "The 101 Greatest Dance Songs of the '90s" in 2017. In 2021, the same publication ranked it number five in their list of "The 50 Best '90s Songs of Summer", naming it "the greatest '90s dance song of the '90s dance genre". Billboard magazine ranked "100% Pure Love" number 500 in their list of the "Top Songs of the '90s" in 2019 and number 81 in "The 100 Greatest LGBTQ+ Anthems of All Time" in 2025. British band Years & Years released a cover of the song in 2022 that Target would use for its holiday campaign that year.

== Track listings ==
- CD maxi
1. "100% Pure Love" (radio mix) – 3:06
2. "100% Pure Love" (club mix) – 8:15
3. "100% Pure Love" (Gumbo mix) – 5:22
- US CD maxi-single (858711–2)
1. "100% Pure Love" (Club Mix) – 8:15
2. "100% Pure Love" (Radio Mix) – 3:06
3. "100% Pure Love" (Gumbo Mix) – 5:22
4. "100% Pure Love" (Hump Mix) – 5:33
5. "100% Pure Love" (DJ EFX's Tribal Pump Mix) – 6:41
6. "100% Pure Love" (PG Tips Anthem Mix) – 7:42
7. "100% Pure Love" (Trance Vox) – 6:40

== Charts ==
=== Weekly charts ===
Weekly chart performance for "100% Pure Love"
| Chart (1994) | Peak position |
|---|---|
| Australia (ARIA) | 2 |
| Austria (Ö3 Austria Top 40) | 26 |
| Belgium (Ultratop 50 Flanders) | 31 |
| Canada Retail Singles (The Record) | 4 |
| Canada Top Singles (RPM) | 42 |
| Canada Dance/Urban (RPM) | 2 |
| Europe (Eurochart Hot 100) | 49 |
| Europe (European Dance Radio) | 1 |
| Europe (European Hit Radio) | 21 |
| Finland (Suomen virallinen lista) | 14 |
| Germany (GfK) | 33 |
| Iceland (Íslenski Listinn Topp 40) | 25 |
| Ireland (IRMA) | 30 |
| Israel (Israeli Singles Chart) | 27 |
| Netherlands (Dutch Top 40) | 11 |
| Netherlands (Single Top 100) | 15 |
| New Zealand (Recorded Music NZ) | 44 |
| Quebec (ADISQ) | 11 |
| Scottish Singles Sales (Official Charts) | 19 |
| Switzerland (Schweizer Hitparade) | 20 |
| UK Singles (Official Charts) | 15 |
| UK Airplay (Music Week) | 13 |
| UK Dance (Music Week) | 1 |
| UK Club Chart (Music Week) | 3 |
| US Billboard Hot 100 | 11 |
| US Dance Club Songs (Billboard) | 1 |
| US Dance Singles Sales (Billboard) | 2 |
| US Hot R&B/Hip-Hop Songs (Billboard) | 38 |
| US Pop Airplay (Billboard) | 7 |
| US Rhythmic Airplay (Billboard) | 10 |
| US Cash Box Top 100 | 5 |

=== Year-end charts ===
1994 year-end chart performance for "100% Pure Love"
| Chart (1994) | Position |
|---|---|
| Australia (ARIA) | 11 |
| Canada Dance/Urban (RPM) | 20 |
| Europe (European Dance Radio) | 4 |
| Netherlands (Dutch Top 40) | 95 |
| Netherlands (Single Top 100) | 98 |
| UK Singles (OCC) | 129 |
| UK Club Chart (Music Week) | 51 |
| US Billboard Hot 100 | 46 |
| US Dance Club Play (Billboard) | 1 |
| US Maxi-Singles Sales (Billboard) | 3 |
| US Cash Box Top 100 | 34 |

1995 year-end chart performance for "100% Pure Love"
| Chart (1995) | Position |
|---|---|
| US Billboard Hot 100 | 82 |

== Certifications ==
Certifications and sales for "100% Pure Love"
| Region | Certification | Certified units/sales |
|---|---|---|
| Australia (ARIA) | Platinum | 70,000^{^} |
| United States (RIAA) | Gold | 500,000^{^} |
^{^} Shipments figures based on certification alone.

== Release history ==
Release dates and formats for "100% Pure Love"
| Region | Date | Format(s) | Label(s) | Ref. |
|---|---|---|---|---|
| United Kingdom | April 11, 1994 | 7-inch vinyl; 12-inch vinyl; CD; cassette | A&M; AM PM | |
| Australia | June 6, 1994 | CD; cassette | Mercury | |

== Years & Years version ==
On November 1, 2022, Olly Alexander-helmed Years & Years released a cover of the song.

=== Charts ===
Weekly chart performance for "100% Pure Love" by Years & Years
| Chart (2022) | Peak position |
|---|---|
| Croatia (HRT) | 54 |
| Japan Hot Overseas (Billboard Japan) | 9 |

== Keke Palmer version ==
In December 2023, actress and singer Keke Palmer teamed up with search engine Google to promote black-owned businesses with a modified cover of Crystal Waters' 100% Pure Love titled for the occasion “100% Black Owned”. A music video was shot for the occasion with appearance and vocals by Crystal Waters. The performance promoted a new search engine highlighting small black owned businesses on the internet.
