= Gypsy Woman (Crystal Waters song) =

1991 single by Crystal Waters

"Gypsy Woman (She's Homeless)"

Single by Crystal Waters

from the album Surprise
- B-side: "Tell Me"
- Released: April 3, 1991
- Genre: Garage house; deep house; dance-pop
- Length: 3:48 (radio mix)
- Label: Mercury
- Songwriters: Neal Conway; Crystal Waters
- Producer: The Basement Boys

Crystal Waters singles chronology
"Gypsy Woman (She's Homeless)" (1991)	"Makin' Happy" (1991)

Music video
- "Gypsy Woman (She's Homeless)" on YouTube

"Gypsy Woman (She's Homeless)" or "Gypsy Woman (La Da Dee La Da Da)" is a song by the American singer-songwriter Crystal Waters from her debut studio album, Surprise (1991). Written by Neal Conway and Waters, and produced by The Basement Boys, the song was released on April 3, 1991, by Mercury Records, as the lead single from the album. It is famous for its "la da dee, la da da" vocal refrain and keyboard riff, and is now widely regarded as one of the biggest classics of house music, being remixed several times since its release.

"Gypsy Woman" peaked at number eight on the US Billboard Hot 100 and topped the charts of Belgium, Italy, the Netherlands, Spain, Switzerland, as well as on the Eurochart Hot 100. The song also peaked within the top 10 of the charts in at least eight countries, including Germany, Ireland, and the United Kingdom, and entered the top 20 in Australia and France. The accompanying music video was directed by Mark Pellington. In 2020, 2022 and 2025, Slant Magazine, Rolling Stone and Billboard magazine ranked "Gypsy Woman" among the best dance songs of all time.

== Background ==
Crystal Waters grew up in a very musical family. Her great aunt, Ethel Waters, was a famous singer and actress in the 1940s. Waters' father was a jazz musician and her uncle was the lead saxophonist with MFSB. At age eleven, she began writing poetry and was inducted into the Poetry Society of America when she was 14, the youngest person ever to receive that honor.

After studying business and computer science at university, she worked for the District of Columbia government, in the computer division, issuing arrest warrants. A workmate's cousin owned a recording studio and Waters found out that it was looking for backup singers. She went to the studio, got a job, and became a writer and backup singer. At a conference held in Washington, she met the house-music production team Basement Boys. They wanted her to write some house songs for them while keeping her jazz influences. Thomas Davis from the Basement Boys told in a 1991 interview, "It was a great combination of influences. Crystal brings a background of jazz and blues to her music, which blended well with our various ideas." The first two songs she wrote were "Makin' Happy" and "Gypsy Woman".

== Writing and release ==
"Gypsy Woman" was written by Waters with Neal Conway and was originally written for the American singer Ultra Naté, but when Waters recorded a demo herself, the production company drew up a recording contract for her on the spot and never passed the song to its intended vocalist. The song portrays a homeless woman who wears make-up and sees herself as beautiful while busking on a street corner. It was released as the first single from her 1991 debut album, Surprise.

Waters began working on the song after receiving beats from her producers she was supposed to write lyrics over. It was the song's heavy bass line that inspired her to riff "la da dee la da da" overtop of the rhythm, but she had trouble coming up with lyrics to match those short syllables. "I said to myself there must be someone singing it, and I thought of this woman ... she used to stand downtown on the corners, and she was dressed in all black," she told the Glitterbox Radio Show in 2017.

In a 2016 interview, Waters expanded on the story behind the lyrics for the song:

When it comes to the song itself, the lyrics came straight out of reality. It's about a woman who stood in front of the Mayflower Hotel in Washington, D.C., on Connecticut Avenue. My sister worked in the hotel and I'd walk past this woman around once a week, and she looked fine. She didn't look like she was homeless. She always had a full face of makeup and black clothes and she'd be singing these gospel songs. I used think, "Well, why don't you go and get a job instead of asking me for money?" Then there was an article on her in the paper! It said she'd just lost her job in retail, and she said that she thought if she was going to ask people for money then she should at least look presentable. And that changed my idea of homelessness. It could happen to anyone. Before that, I just had the hook down. Then I read that and the lyrics came to me. Like she was singing it.

Even though the sound was a huge dance hit, Crystal Waters wanted people to listen to the lyrics about homelessness. She actually was upset that they weren't listening to the lyrics. At her prompting, the record company put a label with the addition of "She's Homeless" on the cover.

A year after its release, a new version turned up on the Red Hot Organization's Red Hot + Dance AIDS fundraiser disc (1992, distributed by Sony Music), gaining its remixer, Joey Negro, his first real American exposure.

== Critical reception ==
"Gypsy Woman" received favorable reviews from most music critics. David Taylor-Wilson from Bay Area Reporter felt it "will undoubtedly go down as the quintessential song of the summer". Larry Flick from Billboard magazine remarked that the "inspired deep house dish" has already begun to explode at club level, "thanks to Waters' unique vocal and a hypnotic hook and groove crafted by hot production team the Basement Boys. Expect extensive radio action [in] several formats momentarily." He also praised it as "pure musical magic." A reviewer from Cash Box stated that by the time the single reached record stores, "it was already a big hit." Marisa Fox from Entertainment Weekly constated, "You just can't escape this summer's runaway hit song, the jazz-house hybrid 'Gypsy Woman' [...]. She hums in an airy, scat-like fashion about a woman 'who's just like you and me but she's homeless...and she stands there singing for money.'" Dave Sholin from the Gavin Report reported, "Exciting and totally fresh, this track broke out of the New York club scene and found its way onto HOT 97. APD/MD Kevin McCabe reports out of the fifty 12-inches he researches each week, it debuted at #3! Kevin says the response is across-the-board with teens requesting it, as well as women 30+ who call in Middays, asking for the song that goes, 'Dah dah dee dah dah dah.' It charts at #16, getting eight plays a day. Also debuted at #29 on KMEL and POWER 106 with adds at WTIC/FM, WIOQ/FM, and Z100 New York. 'Do I love it? YEAH!'"

Lennox Herald viewed it as "a detailed account of the day-to-day life of a homeless woman in Washington, DC". Pan-European magazine Music & Media said "the "La Da Dee La Da Da" bit of this dance track is especially and undeniably catchy. Mainland Europe is next." Alan Jones from Music Week wrote that the "insidious" chorus "can be a little wearing after a while, but there's enough promise in the verses, both melodically and lyrically to suggest that Waters can be a bright new star." Reading Evening Post called it "infectious". James Hamilton from the Record Mirror Dance Update stated that "this Basement Boys produced strange haunting plaintive girl chanted and keyboards jabbed frisky Italo-type canterer has a madly catchy "la da dee, la de dah" chorus". David Fricke from Rolling Stone felt the "deliciously nagging" chorus was "indisputably the Hook of the Year. The heartbeat propulsion and Morse-code keyboard line did the rest." He commented further, "A rather vapid lyric reduction of the sorrow and tragedy of homelessness [...] was nevertheless a rare bright spot of originality and blessed simplicity amid a '91-long plague of Identikit house records and overwrought remixes. [...] Still, for those fab few minutes of 'Gypsy Woman' [...] Waters reigned as this year's Donna Summer." Scott Poulson-Bryant from Spin wrote that "with its nursery-rhymish hook and accessible cultural concern, this hypnotically danceable track has insinuated itself into the pop consciousness with an almost dreamy forcefulness".

== Chart performance ==
"Gypsy Woman" peaked at number eight on the US Billboard Hot 100 and topped the Billboard Dance Club Play chart. In the United Kingdom, "Gypsy Woman" debuted at number three on the UK Singles Chart on May 12, 1991. The following week, the song peaked at number two, becoming Waters' highest-charting song in Britain. It also peaked atop the UK Dance Singles Chart. Retitled "Gypsy Woman (La Da Dee)", the song was the highest-debuting single for a new act on the UK Singles Chart at that time. Its debut at number three on the chart was later eclipsed by Gabrielle's "Dreams" entering at number two in June 1993, then by Whigfield's "Saturday Night" debuting at the top of the chart in September 1994.

In the rest of Europe, "Gypsy Woman" peaked at number one in Belgium, Italy, the Netherlands, Spain and Switzerland. It entered the top 10 of the charts in Austria, Denmark, Finland, Germany, Ireland, Luxembourg, Portugal and Sweden. In West Asia, the song became a top-20 hit in Israel, peaking at number 12 on June 16, 1991. "Gypsy Woman" was awarded with a platinum record in the United Kingdom for 600,000 singles sold and streamed, as well as a gold record in the United States after 500,000 units were shipped.

== Music video ==
The music video for "Gypsy Woman" was directed by American film director, writer, and producer Mark Pellington. It shows Waters performing in front of a white background. In most of the video, she wears a black suit, but some scenes also show her wearing a white suit. Three men in blue, green and red shirts are dancing. Occasionally a "gypsy woman", wearing a theater mask and gold gloves, can be seen holding a handheld mirror while putting on lipstick, dancing under a street light or lying on a park bench. Throughout the video, there are shots of rotating playhouses, falling banknotes, mannequin hands hanging in threads, and spinning umbrellas, some with the chorus written on them, making the words spin with them. A short glimpse of a burning dollhouse appears, and as Waters sings the last stanzas, the screen goes completely white again.

The music video uses the edited version of the Basement Boys "Strip To The Bone" mix. It was later made available on Waters' official YouTube channel in 2009, and has been remastered in HD. As of April 2025, the video had generated more than 131 million views.

== Legacy ==
AllMusic editor Alex Henderson wrote that "Gypsy Woman" "made it clear that house music could be as socially aware as rap". He described it as a "wildly infectious treasure", noting further that it has a "poignant and moving reflection on a homeless woman's struggle that makes its point without preaching." In 2003, Irish Sunday World described it as "instantly catchy". Music critic of Spin, Jonathan Bernstein said in 1994, "So insidious, so remorseless a summer smash was Crystal Water's 'Gypsy Woman' that several defense attorneys got their rooftop sniper clients off the hook by pointing to the subliminal qualities of the song's sinister la-da-di's." In 2006, Slant Magazine ranked it 10th in its "100 Greatest Dance Songs" list, writing:

Crystal Waters's thick-ankled house anthem takes the baton of social consciousness from the likes of Machine. And just as 'There But for the Grace of God Go I' makes its pungent point clear through its musical prickliness, 'Gypsy Woman (She's Homeless)' sets its portrait of a crusty, haphazardly made-up bag lady dementedly begging on street corners to the Basement Boys's unforgivingly brutish thump. As Crystal's first-person protagonist stands there, singing for money, her lah-dah-dee's are nearly buried in the brackish clatter, subtly expressing the heartbreaking fact that the plight of the homeless often falls on completely deaf (sometimes ringing) ears. Waters's astringent message was delivered to a club clientele that had become too pathologically petrified of breaking a sweat, canting a weave, or otherwise allowing themselves to get ugly to actually set foot on any dance floor not shaped like a fashion runway.

In 2011, The Guardian mentioned it on their "A History of Modern Music: Dance". In 2013, Complex featured it in their "15 Songs That Gave Dance Music a Good Name", describing it as "such a mixture of vibes" and "funky". In 2017, BuzzFeed ranked it number 13 in their list of "The 101 Greatest Dance Songs of the '90s". Stopera and Galindo said, "Problematic title. Great song. A classic." In 2010, Tomorrowland included it in their official list of "The Ibiza 500". In 2022, Pitchfork featured it in their lists of "The 30 Best House Tracks of the '90s" and "The 250 Best Songs of the 1990s". The same year, Rolling Stone ranked it number 58 in their list of "200 Greatest Dance Songs of All Time". In 2025, Billboard magazine ranked "Gypsy Woman" number 24 in their "The 100 Best Dance Songs of All Time".

=== Accolades ===
Year	Publisher	Country	Accolade	Rank
1991	Spex	Germany	"Die besten Alben und Songs des Jahres 1991"	2
1991	The Face	United Kingdom	"Recordings of the Year: Singles"	15
1999	Spex	Germany	"Die besten Singles aller Zeiten"	*
1999	The Village Voice	United States	"Top Singles of the 90's"	43
2005	Bruce Pollock	United States	"The 7,500 Most Important Songs of 1944-2000"	*
2005	Süddeutsche Zeitung	Germany	"1020 Songs 1955-2005"	*
2006	Slant Magazine	United States	"100 Greatest Dance Songs"	48
2010	Groove	Germany	"Die 100 wichtigsten Tracks der letzten 20 Jahre"	*
2011	MTV Dance	United Kingdom	"The 100 Biggest 90's Dance Anthems of All Time"	27
2011	The Guardian	United Kingdom	"A History of Modern Music: Dance"	*
2012	Porcys	Poland	"100 Singli 1990–1999"	20
2013	Complex	United States	"15 Songs That Gave Dance Music a Good Name"	*
2013	Vibe	United States	"Before EDM: 30 Dance Tracks from the '90s That Changed the Game"	14
2015	Robert Dimery	United States	"1,001 Songs You Must Hear Before You Die, and 10,001 You Must Download (2015 Update)"	1002
2017	BuzzFeed	United States	"The 101 Greatest Dance Songs of the '90s"	13
2017	Mixmag	United Kingdom	"10 of the Best Tracks Played at Club MTV"	*
2018	Mixmag	United Kingdom	"The 30 Best Vocal House Anthems Ever"	*
2020	Slant Magazine	United States	"The 100 Best Dance Songs of All Time"	10
2021	BuzzFeed	United States	"The 50 Best '90s Songs of Summer"	32
2022	Classic Pop	United Kingdom	"90s Dance – The Essential Playlist"	16
2022	Pitchfork	United States	"The 30 Best House Tracks of the '90s"	*
2022	Pitchfork	United States	"The 250 Best Songs of the 1990s"	108
2022	Rolling Stone	United States	"200 Greatest Dance Songs of All Time"	58
2025	Billboard	United States	"The 100 Best Dance Songs of All Time"	24
2025	Billboard	United States	"The 50 Best House Songs of All Time"	11
	Pause & Play	United States	"Songs Inducted into a Time Capsule, One Track at Each Week"	*

(*) indicates the list is unordered.

=== Parody ===
In November 1991, the sketch comedy television series, In Living Color, produced a parody music video of the song as “My Songs Are Mindless" sung by Kim Wayans. In this video, Kim (as Waters) sings about using television programming catch phrases to sing the same song with different nonsense lyrics, including laughing in time to the tune how rich she is from making such mindless material, and that she will have more hit material now that she purchased a cable package. The sketch reportedly angered Waters and subjected her children to teasing by schoolmates.

== Track listings ==
- CD single
1. "Gypsy Woman (She's Homeless)" (Strip To The Bone Radio Edit) — 3:42
2. "Gypsy Woman (She's Homeless)" (Hump Instrumental Mix) – 4:53
- Slimcase international CD maxi
1. "Gypsy Woman (She's Homeless)" (Strip To The Bone Radio Edit) — 3:42
2. "Gypsy Woman (She's Homeless)" (Basement Boy "Strip To The Bone" Mix) – 7:26
3. "Gypsy Woman (She's Homeless)" (Hump Instrumental Mix) – 4:53
- CD maxi single
1. "Gypsy Woman (She's Homeless)" (Strip To The Bone Radio Edit) – 3:42
2. "Gypsy Woman (She's Homeless)" (Basement Boy "Strip To The Bone" Mix) – 7:26
3. "Gypsy Woman (She's Homeless)" (Red Bone Club Mix) – 7:08
4. "Gypsy Woman (She's Homeless)" (Hump Instrumental Mix) – 4:53
5. "Gypsy Woman (She's Homeless)" ("Give It Up" Vocal Mix) – 8:07
6. "Gypsy Woman (She's Homeless)" (Give It Up Bonus Beats) – 2:43
7. "Gypsy Woman (She's Homeless)" (Original Demo Mix) – 7:00
8. "Gypsy Woman (She's Homeless)" (Acapella) – 2:37

== Charts ==
=== Weekly charts ===
Chart (1991)	Peak position
Australia (ARIA)	11
Austria (Ö3 Austria Top 40)	3
Belgium (Ultratop 50 Flanders)	1
Canada Top Singles (RPM)	28
Canada Dance/Urban (RPM)	1
Denmark (IFPI)	6
Europe (Eurochart Hot 100)	1
Europe (European Hit Radio)	2
Finland (Suomen virallinen lista)	3
France (SNEP)	11
Germany (GfK)	2
Ireland (IRMA)	3
Israel (Israeli Singles Chart)	12
Italy (Musica e dischi)	1
Luxembourg (Radio Luxembourg)	2
Netherlands (Dutch Top 40)	1
Netherlands (Single Top 100)	1
New Zealand (Recorded Music NZ)	50
Portugal (AFP)	2
Quebec (ADISQ)	14
Spain (AFYVE)	1
Sweden (Sverigetopplistan)	8
Switzerland (Schweizer Hitparade)	1
UK Singles (Official Charts)	2
UK Airplay (Music Week)	10
UK Dance (Music Week)	1
UK Club Chart (Record Mirror)	1
US Billboard Hot 100	8
US Dance Club Songs (Billboard)	1
US Dance Singles Sales (Billboard)	1
US Hot R&B/Hip-Hop Songs (Billboard)	25
US Cash Box Top 100	30

=== Year-end charts ===
Chart (1991)	Position
Austria (Ö3 Austria Top 40)	23
Belgium (Ultratop)	10
Canada Dance/Urban (RPM)	13
Europe (Eurochart Hot 100)	8
Europe (European Hit Radio)	14
Germany (Media Control)	14
Israel (Israeli Singles Chart)	29
Netherlands (Dutch Top 40)	21
Netherlands (Single Top 100)	14
Sweden (Topplistan)	57
Switzerland (Schweizer Hitparade)	11
UK Singles (OCC)	32
UK Club Chart (Record Mirror)	6
US 12-inch Singles Sales (Billboard)	2
US Dance Club Play (Billboard)	4

== Certifications ==
Region	Certification	Certified units/sales
United Kingdom (BPI)	Platinum	600,000^{‡}
United States (RIAA)	Gold	500,000^{^}
^{^} Shipments figures based on certification alone.^{‡} Sales+streaming figures based on certification alone.

== Release history ==
Region	Version	Date	Format(s)	Label(s)	Ref.
United States	Original	April 3, 1991	—N/a	Mercury	
United Kingdom	Original	May 7, 1991	7-inch vinyl; 12-inch vinyl; CD; cassette	A&M PM	
Australia	Original	July 1, 1991	12-inch vinyl; CD; cassette	Mercury	
Japan	Original	July 25, 1991	Mini-CD	Mercury	
Australia	Original	August 12, 1991	12-inch vinyl	Mercury	
United Kingdom	Remix with "Peace" (remix)	September 21, 1992	7-inch vinyl; 12-inch vinyl; CD; cassette	Epic	

== See also ==
- List of number-one dance singles of 1991 (U.S.)
