= In de Ghetto =

"In de Ghetto '96"

Single by David Morales & The Bad Yard Club featuring Crystal Waters & Delta
- Released: 1996
- Genre: House; deep house
- Length: 2:54
- Label: Manifesto
- Songwriter(s): David Morales; Delta Bennett; Handel Tucker; Lowell Dunbar
- Producer(s): David Morales; Handel Tucker; Lowell Dunbar

Crystal Waters singles chronology
Relax (1995)	In de Ghetto '96 (1996)	Say... If You Feel Alright (1997)

"In de Ghetto" is a song by American DJ David Morales. He released it in 1994 with Delta Bennett. In 1996, a new version, "In de Ghetto '96", included participation of the Bad Yard Club and featured Crystal Waters. The song charted on the US Billboard Hot Dance Club Play chart, now known as Dance Club Songs chart, making it to number 20. It also made an appearance in the UK Singles Chart, peaking at number 35, making it Morales' only charting single in the UK.

== Critical reception ==
Upon the original release, Larry Flick from Billboard magazine wrote, "Morales' underappreciated 1993 album, The Program, is sent into club waters one more time via this intense ragga-house anthem. The hook konks you on the head, as featured toaster/rapper Delta swerves around the groove with hipswaying grace. Morales does all of the remixing himself, having a field day with tribal beats on the dub. Will be the source of much dancefloor catharsis." James Hamilton from the Record Mirror Dance Update described it as a "ragga girl stuttered fluttery percussive canterer" in his weekly dance column.

Upon the release of the '96 remix, Flick commented, "This reggae-kissed house anthem has been a dancefloor staple for well over a year now. Now serving as the first single from Mercury's imminent 100% Pure Dance compilation, it has been refreshed with a deliciously feline guest vocal by Waters. She vamps with infectious energy and glee, while Morales upgrades the groove by injecting glossy pop keyboards. Icing on the cake is a killer, instantly chantable hook, which should push it over the top with popsters who enjoy the growing influx of dance music on radio." He also noted, "It's cute to hear La Waters tearing her way through one of Morales' better deep-house grooves, though it will feel like only a tease after a while. After all, it has been two years since Storyteller was released."

== 1996 remix version ==
=== Track listing ===
1. "In de Ghetto" (Boss mix) – 7:28
2. "In de Ghetto" (1996 Project 1 Jungle Mix) – 4:49

=== Charts ===
Chart (1994/1996)	Peak position
UK Singles (OCC)	35
UK Club Chart (Music Week)	7
US Hot Dance Club Play (Billboard)	20

== Covers, samplings and adaptations ==
The track has been covered and remixed a number of times

=== Greg B version ===
Most notably a version by Greg B released on Sony BMG and included in the compilation Été 2007.

=== Tribal Nation version ===
In 1995, Tribal Nation released a cover that charted in France.

Charts

Chart (1995)	Peak position
France (SNEP)	39

=== Tribes World ===
In 2003, Tribes World released a cover that charted in France.

Charts

Chart (2003)	Peak position
France (SNEP)	88

=== J Balvin & Skrillex version ===
The song was heavily sampled in 2021 by the Colombian singer J Balvin and the American record producer Skrillex in an amended title "In da Getto". It includes added rap lyrics. The song charted in a great number of countries including number one in Colombia, number two on both the US Billboard Dance/Electronic Songs and US Billboard Latin Airplay charts and number seven on the US Hot Latin Songs chart. It also charted in France, Italy and Spain amongst others.
