= Eddy de Pretto =

French singer-songwriter and actor

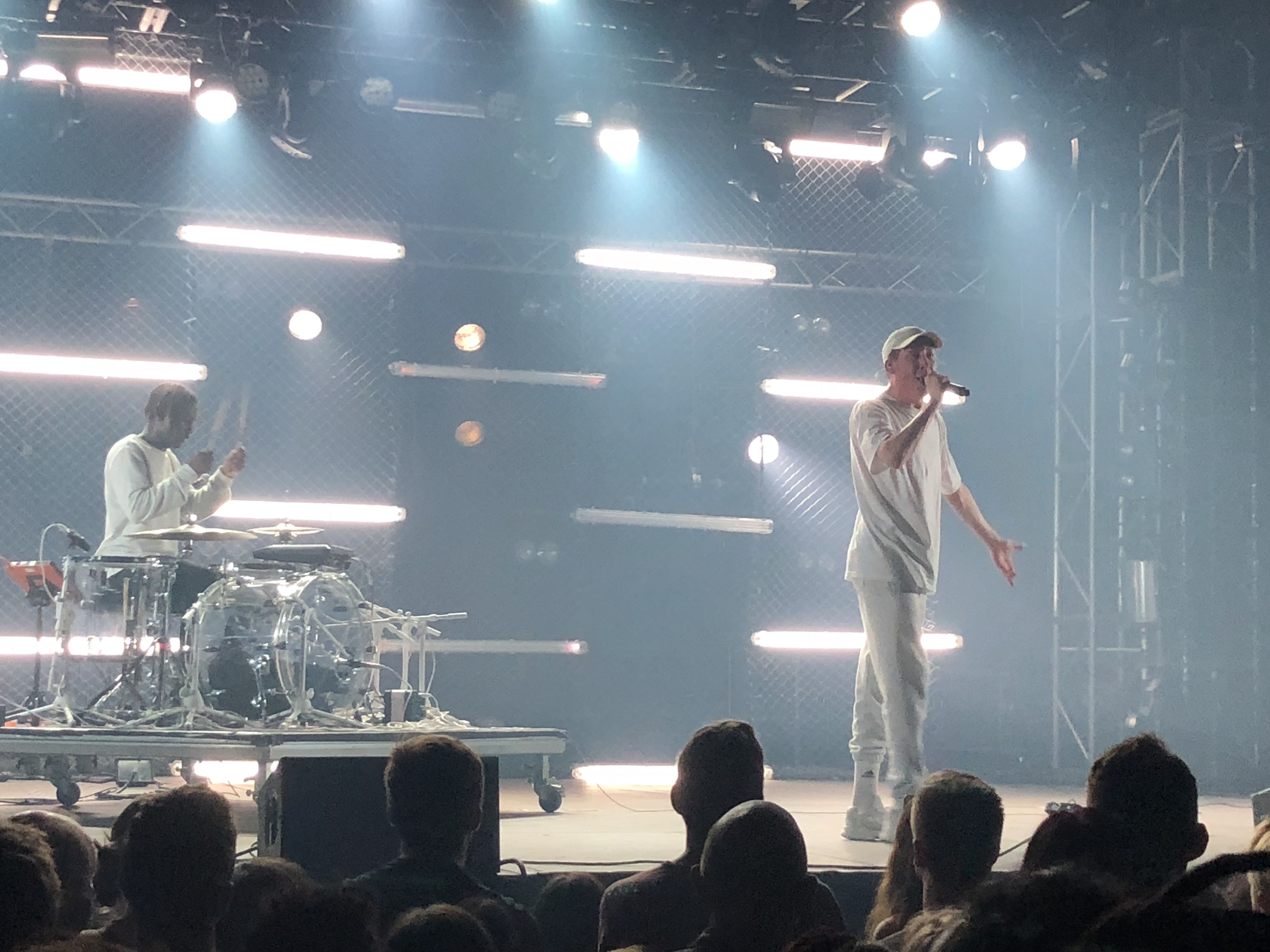
- de Pretto performing at Le Botanique in Brussels in 2018

Background information
- Born: 2 May 1993 (age 33); Créteil, France
- Genres: Chanson française; hip hop
- Occupations: Singer-songwriter; actor; rapper
- Instrument: Vocals
- Years active: 2016–present
- Labels: Initial Artist Services; Universal Music France
- Website: www.eddydepretto.com

Eddy Antoine Jean de Pretto (born 2 May 1993 in Créteil in the Val-de-Marne) is a French singer-songwriter, actor and rapper.

== Early life ==
Eddy de Pretto was born on 2 May 1993 and grew up in Créteil in the Val-de-Marne. His father is a truck driver and football fan, his mother a laboratory technician and art lover. He sings about his native city in Beaulieue. In an interview, he described his hometown:

...a certain amount of anger, a desire to better myself. There's a bit of a sort of straightjacket in the banlieues, like it or not: we're told we're on the margin, that we'll amount to nothing, that we'll come to a bad end. Me, my head was full of dreams and a little voice told me I'd get there. The desire to overcome [it all] helped me succeed...

At the age of twelve, de Pretto started lessons in theatre, singing, vocal technique and piano: "I took the TV remote for a microphone and operated a halogen lamp for lighting. So my mother suggested taking theatre lessons since I didn't excel at sport." He continued his education at the Institut supérieur des arts de la scène (ECM-ISAS, "Advanced Institute of Dramatic Arts") in Paris.

== Acting ==
De Pretto's first acting experiences were in TV advertisements, such as the role of a young Julius Caesar for CanalSat in September 2010, before entering into the theatrical and film worlds: the short films Königsberg by Philipp Mayrhofer in 2012 and Vivre sa vie by Paul D. Meyer in 2013, as well as an appearance in the feature film Paulette by Jérôme Enrico in the role of "the young hippy buyer", also in 2013.

== Music career ==
Between the ages of eighteen and nineteen de Pretto began to write songs. In his first public performance he sang R. Kelly's "I Believe I Can Fly" at his local youth centre: "I was totally weak, ... so stressed out because there was a lot of rap and I didn't fit into that genre at all", he said in an interview.

de Pretto participated in the Printemps de Bourges music festival, where he won the Inouïs ("unheard of, amazing") prize, and the Bars en Trans festival, and is a graduate of inRocKs Lab 2016. In October 2017, he also took part in the Festival Off Off Off (Nuits de Champagne festival) in Troyes.

=== Kid and Cure ===
He released his first EP Kid on 6 October 2017. In the live performances of the EP he played sound clips from his iPhone connected with a cable. The only live musician at his concerts was a drummer.

In early January 2018, on the stage of the television programme Taratata, he sang "Comme un boomerang" in duet with Julien Doré, a song written by Serge Gainsbourg and previously performed by Dani and Étienne Daho in 2001.

In mid-January 2018, he launched "Random", the first song from his debut album Cure, describing his heartaches.

Along with Gaël Faye and Fishbach, he was nominated for "Best Newcomer Stage Act" at the 33rd Victoires de la Musique in 2018. Gaël Faye won the award.

In mid-February 2018, he introduced his song "Ego" with "a stripped down, mechanical instrumental", which the singer explained: "I set down the possibility of becoming unhinged because of the speed at which the project is going. By dint of hearing praise, the 'excess of self' implodes, and that's the risk I'm exposing here. The simple fear of degenerating into a fanaticism of the self through social media, endearments, and all other flattering signals that create this monster of ego."

On 2 March 2018, he released his first album Cure, on CD, vinyl and in digital format. At the same time, the clip for "Normal" was unveiled, which took on stereotypes of sexual identity, fear of the other and homophobia: "An anger about people who were attacking me because they didn't like the person I embodied", he explained in the magazine Têtu. A week after its release, the recording was ranked the number one best-selling album ahead of Vous et moi by Julien Doré, with 13,500 copies, "driving out" Grand Corps Malade from Fnac's Top French Albums listing.

=== À tous les bâtards ===
On 25 March 2021, he released the album À tous les bâtards, featuring his two previously released singles, Bateaux-Mouches and Désolé Caroline, alongside a COLORS SHOW performance of the song "Parfaitement", which was released on YouTube ahead of the album's release. The 16-track album featured an artwork given to de Pretto by a fan, the design of which shows the sketch of the artist's head superimposed onto a yellow background, a trend continued from his previous album's cover where he superimposed bodybuilder Arnold Schwarzenegger's arm onto an image of himself.

== Personal life ==
As alluded to in some of his songs, de Pretto does not hide his homosexuality: "I'm not militant. I don't want to be a standard-bearer. I just want to give an account of my life, my reality," he added in an interview. He defines himself as a "non-genre" artist. In the TV programme Taratata, broadcast on 15 December 2017, he explained that he was trying to examine masculinity and the hypermasculinity that made up part of his education. When Nagui asked him if he talked about homosexuality in his songs, he responded that that was in no way his goal. Speaking to Les Inrockuptibles, the singer said: "I try to speak about my personal history and to normalise it as much as possible. And not to highlight it saying I'm the first queer to link rap and French chanson".

== Discography ==
=== Album ===
Year	Album	Peak positions		
Year	Album	FRA	BEL (Wa)	SWI
2018	Cure	1	4	6
2021	À tous les bâtards	4	4	11
2023	Crash cœur	5	9	49

=== EP ===
Year	Title
2017	Kid

=== Singles ===
Year	Song	Peak positions		Album
Year	Song	FRA	BEL (Wa)	Album
2017	"Fête de trop"	21	Tip	Kid EP
2017	"Kid"	67	Tip	Kid EP
2018	"Random"	98	—	Cure
2018	"Normal"	151	50	Cure
2021	"Bateaux-mouches"	87	—	À tous les bâtards
2023	"Love'n'Tendresse"	108	10	Crash cœur
2024	"Urgences 911"	—	40	Crash cœur
2026	"Sous influence"	—	4	Non-album single

=== Other charting songs ===
Year	Song	Peak positions		Album
Year	Song	FRA	BEL (Wa)	Album
2018	"Beaulieue"	195	—	Cure
2018	"Quartier des lunes"	188	—	Cure
2018	"Grave"	150	Tip	Cure
2021	"Freaks"	158	—	À tous les bâtards
2021	"Désolé Caroline"	198	—	À tous les bâtards
2021	"Parfaitement"	—	—	À tous les bâtards
2021	"Pause" (with Yseult)	128	—	À tous les bâtards

=== Covers ===
- 2017: "Je suis pas fou" by Jul
- 2017: "Du bout des lèvres" by Barbara
- 2018: "Comme un boomerang" by Serge Gainsbourg (duet with Julien Doré)

== Filmography ==
=== Feature films ===
Year	Title	Director	Role
2013	Paulette	Jérôme Enrico	le jeune bab acheteur ("the young hippy buyer")
2014	Rien pour Pehuajo	Nelly Fantoni	la femme en vert (vidéo) ("the woman in green")

=== Short films ===
Year	Title	Director	Role
2012	Königsberg	Philipp Mayrhofer	Antoine
2013	Vivre sa vie	Paul D. Meyer	Alex

=== Television ===
Year	Title	Role	Notes
2023	Drag Race France	Himself	Guest judge (Season 2); Episode: "Le Snatch Game"

== Awards and nominations ==
Year	Event	Award	Result	Ref
2017	Printemps de Bourges	Prix du Printemps de Bourges – iNOUïS	Won	
2018	Victoires de la Musique	Groupe ou artiste révélation scène ("Best Newcomer Stage Act")	Nominated	
