= Crystal Waters =

American singer-songwriter (born 1961)

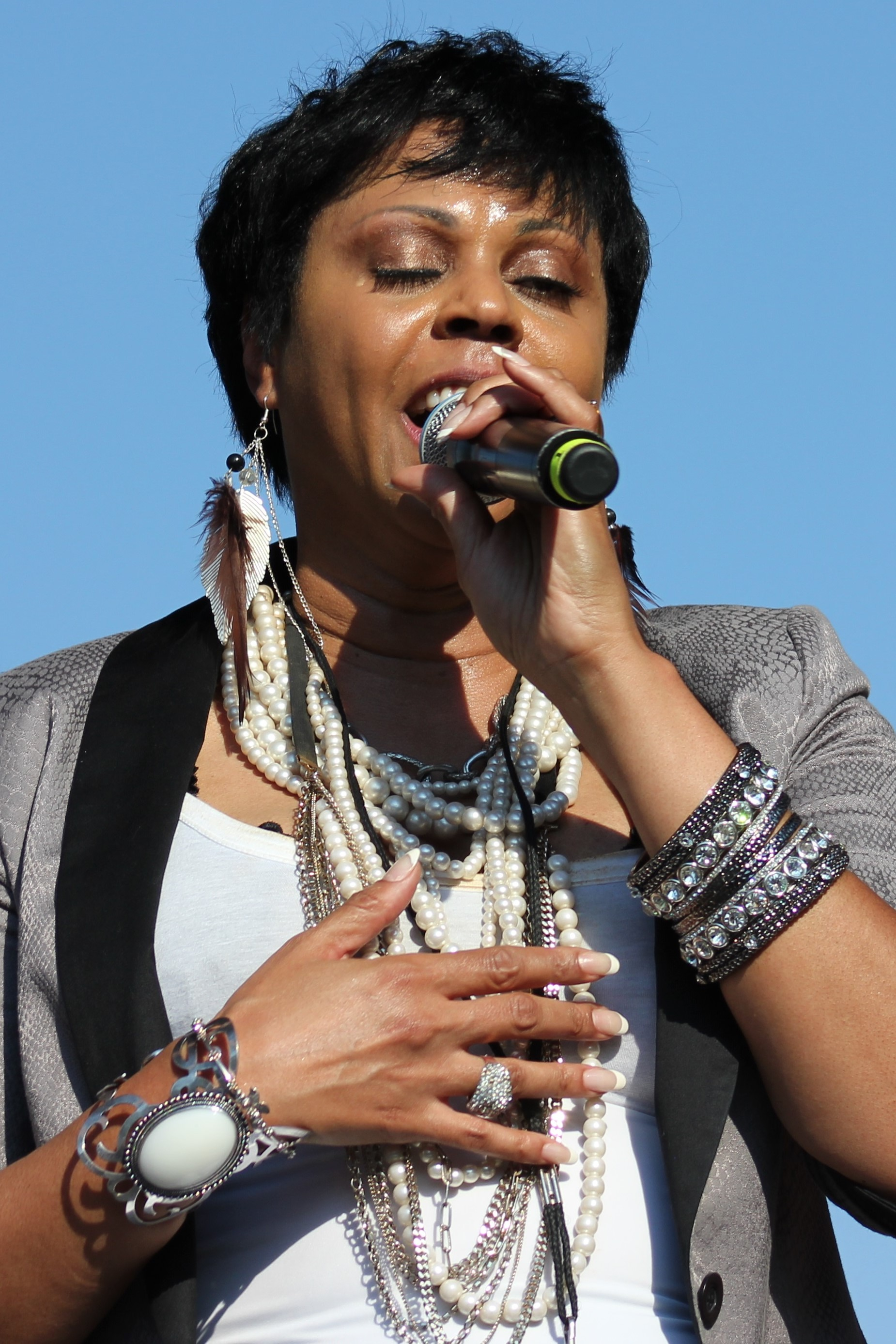
- Waters performing in 2012
- Born: November 19, 1961 (age 64); Deptford Township, New Jersey, U.S.
- Occupations: Singer; songwriter; radio host; record producer
- Years active: 1989–present
- Relatives: Ethel Waters (great aunt)
- Musical career
- Genres: House; dance; deep house; funk; hip hop soul; electronic
- Instrument: Vocals
- Labels: Mercury; PolyGram; Strictly Rhythm; Defected
- Website: iamcrystalwaters.com

Crystal Waters (born November 19, 1961) is an American house and dance music singer and songwriter, best known for her 1990s dance hits "Gypsy Woman" and "100% Pure Love", and 2007's "Destination Calabria" with Alex Gaudino. All three of her studio albums produced a Top 40 hit on the Billboard Hot 100. In December 2016, Billboard magazine ranked her as one of the most successful dance artists of all time. Her accolades include six ASCAP Songwriter awards, three American Music Award nominations, an MTV Video Music Award nod, four Billboard Music Awards and twelve No. 1 Billboard Dance Chart hits. Her hit song "Gypsy Woman” has been sampled hundreds of times. Though her music sales have yet to be re-certified, Waters has sold over seven million records worldwide.

== Early life ==
Born in Deptford Township, New Jersey, Waters is the daughter of jazz musician Junior Waters and his wife Betty. Her great-aunt, Ethel Waters, was one of the first black American vocalists to appear in mainstream Hollywood musicals. Her family moved to New Jersey for a while but they again moved to Washington, D.C. At age eleven she began writing poetry, eventually getting inducted into the Poetry Society of America when she was 14, the youngest person ever to receive that honor.

She studied business and computer science at Howard University, but her creative work as a musician dropped off as she found less time for it. After earning her college degree in 1989, Waters secured a job as a probation officer with the Washington, D.C. parole board, making a living that would support her two daughters. One of her daughters, Ella Nicole, is a singer-songwriter who was discovered in 2014 and managed by Samonee K. founder of Argo Vibes.

== Music career ==
Waters' first job in the music world was as a backup singer at a local recording studio. She realized she wanted the creative control of writing her own music. Meeting the Basement Boys at a D.C. conference, they agreed to collaborate. Waters' self-described style was jazz and the Basement Boys was house. The first two songs she wrote for the 'Boys were "Makin' Happy" and "Gypsy Woman".

Waters signed a writing contract with Mercury Records in 1989.

Her single "Makin' Happy", with contributions by remixer Steve "Silk" Hurley, shot quickly to No. 1 on the Billboard Dance Club Songs.

With her 1994 follow-up album, Storyteller, Waters made a mainstream comeback with her hit single "100% Pure Love", which hit number 11 on the Billboard Hot 100, No. 1 on the Billboard Dance Club Songs, and became one of the longest-charting singles on the Hot 100 at 45 weeks ("Gypsy Woman" had remained on the chart for 16 weeks). Along with the single, her second album Storyteller, sold over one million copies in the United States. Feminist scholar and social activist bell hooks described Waters as "fierce and politically on the job" because of the singer's socially conscious lyrics.

In 1996, Waters participated in the AIDS benefit album Red Hot + Rio, which was produced by the Red Hot Organization, performing the song "The Boy from Ipanema".

In 2007, the mega European hit "Destination Calabria" by Alex Gaudino, featuring vocals by Crystal Waters, went to No. 1 on the European Pop Chart in over 30 countries. The track is a mashup, taking the instrumental from Rune's "Calabria" and the vocals from Alex Gaudino's and Crystal Waters' "Destination Unknown", both originally released in 2003. It was produced with the help of Maurizio Nari and Ronnie Milani (Nari & Milani), matching the saxophone hook/riff from "Calabria" to Crystal Waters' voice. "Destination Calabria" was released as a 12-inch single by the Italian label Rise Records, and as a CD single on March 19, 2007 by British label Data Records. It originally charted in Australia in February 2004, peaking at No. 98 under the title "Destination Unknown" before being re-released as "Destination Calabria" and reaching No. 2 in 2007.

In 2012, "Le Bump" with Yolanda Be Cool gave Waters another No. 1 on the Beatport House Chart.

With DJ Chris Cox in 2013, the No. 1 Billboard Dance Club Songs hit "Mama Hey", was listed as one of Billboard's "Top 50 Dance Songs of 2013".

In November 2015, Waters released "Synergy", and in October 2016 she released "Believe". Both songs quickly rose to the No. 1 spot on the Billboard Dance Club Songs.

Her 2017 single "Testify" with Hifi Sean was released on Defected Records and went straight to the A-List on BBC Radio and garnered another No. 1 spot on the Billboard Dance Club Songs.

Her third collaboration with Sted-E & Hybrid Heights, titled "I Am House", reached No. 1 in the club charts in Spring 2018, giving Waters a total of twelve No. 1 singles in the US Billboard Dance Club Songs.

In February 2020, she began a monthly radio/podcast show called "I Am House".

== Discography ==
=== Studio albums ===
Year	Album details	Peak chart positions						Certifications (sales thresholds)
Year	Album details	US	AUS	AUT	GER	NED	SWI	Certifications (sales thresholds)
1991	Surprise: Released: June 25, 1991; Label: Mercury	197	171	23	45	81	24	
1994	Storyteller: Released: May 17, 1994; Label: Mercury	199	55	—	—	—	—	RIAA: Gold
1997	Crystal Waters: Released: June 24, 1997; Label: Mercury/Polygram	—	—	—	—	—	—	
"—" denotes releases that did not chart or were not released.

=== Compilation albums ===
Year	Album details
1998	The Best of Crystal Waters: Released: August 11, 1998; Label: Universal/Polygram
2001	Gypsy Woman – The Collection: Released: 2001; Label: Spectrum Music
2001	20th Century Masters – The Millennium Collection: The Best of Crystal Waters: Released: 2001; Label: Mercury Records

=== Singles ===
Year	Title	Peak chart positions										Certifications (sales thresholds)	Album
Year	Title	US	AUS	AUT	FRA	GER	IRE	NED	NZ	SWI	UK	Certifications (sales thresholds)	Album
1991	"Gypsy Woman"	8	11	3	11	2	3	1	50	1	2	RIAA: Gold; BPI: Platinum	Surprise
1991	"Makin' Happy"	—	—	—	17	—	22	27	—	22	18		Surprise
1991	"Surprise"	—	—	—	—	—	—	—	—	—	—		Surprise
1991	"Megamix"	—	—	—	—	—	—	—	—	—	39		Megamix!
1992	"You Turn Me On"	—	—	—	—	—	—	—	—	—	—		Encino Man soundtrack
1994	"100% Pure Love"	11	2	26	—	33	30	15	44	20	15	RIAA: Gold; ARIA: Platinum	Storyteller
1994	"What I Need"	82	130	—	—	—	—	—	—	—	—		Storyteller
1994	"Ghetto Day"	—	94	—	—	—	—	—	—	—	40		Storyteller
1995	"Relax"	—	133	—	—	—	—	—	—	—	37		Storyteller
1996	"In de Ghetto" (with David Morales & the Bad Yard Club)	—	—	—	—	—	—	—	—	—	35		Non-album single
1996	"The Boy from Ipanema"	—	—	—	—	—	—	—	—	—	—		Red Hot + Rio
1997	"Say... If You Feel Alright"	40	152	—	—	—	—	—	32	—	45		Crystal Waters
1997	"Just a Freak" (with Dennis Rodman)	—	—	—	—	—	—	—	—	—	—		Crystal Waters
2001	"Come On Down"	—	—	—	—	—	—	—	—	—	—		DJ Escape: Party Time 2002
2001	"Enough"	—	—	—	—	—	—	—	—	—	—		Non-album single
2001	"Nights in Egypt" (with Sunseeker)	—	—	—	—	—	—	—	—	—	—		Various Artists: Club Base Vol. 9
2003	"My Time" (with Dutch)	—	18	—	—	—	—	—	—	—	22		My Time: Remix EP
2004	"Destination Unknown" (with Alex Gaudino)	—	98	—	—	—	—	—	—	—	—		Non-album single
2004	"Lies"	—	—	—	—	—	—	—	—	—	—		DJ Boom: Electro Compilation
2006	"Destination Calabria" (with Alex Gaudino)	—	3	55	6	30	2	14	35	50	4	ARIA: Platinum; BPI: Platinum	Non-album single
2008	"Dancefloor" (with Speakerbox)	—	—	—	—	—	—	—	—	—	—		Dancefloor: Remix EP
2009	"Never Enough"	—	—	—	—	—	—	—	—	—	—		Non-album single
2009	"Gypsy Woman 2009" (vs. Tristan Garner)	—	—	—	—	—	—	76	—	—	—		Gypsy Woman 2009: Remix EP
2009	"Gypsy Woman 2010" (vs. DJ Flava)	—	—	—	—	—	—	—	—	—	—		Non-album single
2010	"When People Come Together" (with Bellani & Spada)	—	—	—	—	—	—	—	—	—	—		Non-album single
2011	"Say Yeah" (vs. Fred Pellichero)	—	—	—	—	—	—	—	—	—	—		Non-album single
2011	"Le Bump" (with Yolanda Be Cool)	—	—	—	—	—	—	—	—	—	—		Non-album single
2011	"Masquerade"	—	—	—	—	—	—	—	—	—	—		Non-album single
2012	"Long Day" (with Inaya Day Allstars)	—	—	—	—	—	—	—	—	—	—		Non-album single
2012	"Love I Call My Own" (with Nicola Fasano & Steve Forest)	—	—	—	—	—	—	—	—	—	—		Love I Call My Own: Remix EP
2013	"Oh Mama Hey" (with Chris Cox and DJ Frankie)	—	—	—	—	—	—	—	—	—	—		Non-album single
2013	"Blow" (with Armand Pena, Harry Romero, and Alex Alicea)	—	—	—	—	—	—	—	—	—	—		Non-album single
2013	"Gypsy Woman 2013" (with Musique Boutique)	—	—	—	—	—	—	—	—	—	—		Gypsy Woman 2013: Remix EP
2014	"Be Kind" (with StoneBridge)	—	—	—	—	—	—	—	—	—	—		Be Kind: Remix EP
2014	"Every Day" (with Murk)	—	—	—	—	—	—	—	—	—	—		Non-album single
2015	"Let Me Be the One" (with David Tort & Nick Marsh)	—	—	—	—	—	—	—	—	—	—		Non-album single
2015	"Synergy" (with Sted-E & Hybrid Heights)	—	—	—	—	—	—	—	—	—	—		Non-album single
2016	"Believe" (featuring Sted-E & Hybrid Heights)	—	—	—	—	—	—	—	—	—	—		Non-album single
2017	"Testify" (Hifi Sean featuring Crystal Waters)	—	—	—	—	—	—	—	—	—	38		Non-album single
2018	"I Am House" (with Sted-E and Hybrid Heights)	—	—	—	—	—	—	—	—	—	—		Non-album single
2018	"Merry Christmas All" (Hybrid Heights, Sted-E, John J-C Carr, Stacy Kidd)	—	—	—	—	—	—	—	—	—	—		Non-album single
2019	"United in Dance" (with R-NALDO)	—	—	—	—	—	—	—	—	—	—		Non-album single
2020	"Party People" (with DJ Spen and DJ Micfreak)	—	—	—	—	—	—	—	—	—	—		Non-album single
"—" denotes releases that did not chart or were not released.

== Awards and nominations ==
Year	Nominated work	Award	Category	Result
1991	"Gypsy Woman"	American Music Awards	Favorite Single – Dance	Nominated
1991	Herself	American Music Awards	Favorite Artist – Dance	Nominated
1991	Herself	American Music Awards	Favorite New Artist – Dance	Nominated
1992	"Makin' Happy"	Billboard Music Video Awards	Best Dance Video – Female	Nominated
1994	Herself	Billboard Music Awards	Top Hot Dance Music Club Play Artist	Nominated
1994	Herself	Billboard Music Awards	Top Hot Dance Music Maxi-Singles Sales Artist	Nominated
1994	"100% Pure Love"	Billboard Music Awards	Top-Selling Hot Dance Music Club Play Single	Won
1994	"100% Pure Love"	Billboard Music Awards	Top Hot Dance Music Maxi-Single Sales	Nominated
1994	"100% Pure Love"	MTV Video Music Awards	Best Dance Video	Nominated
1994	Storyteller	Vibe's Music Poll	Best Album – Club/Dance	Won
1996	"100% Pure Love"	ASCAP Pop Music Awards	Most Performed Song	Won
2004	"My Time" (with Dutch)	International Dance Music Awards	Best House/Garage Dance Track	Nominated
2025	Herself	Electronic Dance Music Awards	Female Icon Award	Won
2026	I Am House Radio	Electronic Dance Music Awards	Best Radio Show	Nominated
The listed years are of the annual ceremonies, usually held the following year.

== See also ==
- List of Billboard number-one dance club songs
- List of artists who reached number one on the U.S. Dance Club Songs chart
