= Storyteller (Crystal Waters album) =

Studio album by Crystal Waters
- Released: May 17, 1994
- Recorded: 1993–1994
- Studio: Basement Boys Studios (Baltimore, Maryland)
- Genre: House; dance; electronica
- Length: 48:44
- Label: Mercury
- Producer: David Anthony; Easy Mo Bee; Greg Smith; The Basement Boys; The LG Experience

Crystal Waters chronology
Surprise (1991)	Storyteller (1994)	Crystal Waters (1997)

Singles from Storyteller
- 1. "100% Pure Love" Released: April 11, 1994; 2. "Ghetto Day/What I Need" Released: June 1994; 3. "Relax" Released: March 1, 1995

Storyteller is the second studio album by American singer-songwriter Crystal Waters, released on May 17, 1994, by Mercury Records. The album peaked at number 199 on the US Billboard 200, number 73 on the Top R&B/Hip-Hop Albums chart and number 8 on the Top Heatseekers chart. Four singles were released from the album: "What I Need", "Relax", "Ghetto Day", and the hit, "100% Pure Love". "Ghetto Day" samples The 5th Dimension's 1968 hit "Stoned Soul Picnic".

Storyteller sold 1 million copies and was certified gold in the United States.

== Reception ==
Professional ratings
Review scores
Source	Rating
The Advocate	(favorable)
AllMusic	4.5/5 stars
Billboard	(favorable)
Cash Box	(favorable)
Entertainment Weekly	B+
Knoxville News Sentinel	2.5/5 stars
Los Angeles Times	3/5 stars
Robert Christgau	(neither)
Rolling Stone	3/5 stars
Spin	(favorable)

The album debuted at 199 on the US Billboard 200. Since its release, it has gone gold, and sold over 1 million copies worldwide. Upon release, the album received generally positive reviews from contemporary music critics. It won Vibe's 1994 Music Poll for Best Club/Dance Album. It was the no. 12 Best Album of 1994 in Spin.

== Track listing ==
Storyteller track listing
No.	Title	Writer(s)	Producer(s)	Length
1.	"100% Pure Love"	Crystal Waters; Tommy Davis; Theodore Douglas; Jay Steinhour	The Basement Boys	4:38
2.	"Ghetto Day"	Waters; Sean Spencer	The Basement Boys	3:32
3.	"Regardless"	Waters; Greg Smith	Smith	3:37
4.	"I Believe I Love You"	Waters; Smith	Smith	3:42
5.	"Relax"	Waters; David Anthony	Anthony	3:29
6.	"What I Need"	Waters; Doug Smith; Richard Payton	The Basement Boys	4:44
7.	"Storyteller"	Waters; Neal Conway; Sean Spencer	The Basement Boys	4:41
8.	"Is It for Me"	Waters; David Bach; George Mitchell; John Selway	The Basement Boys	4:22
9.	"Listen for My Beep"	Waters; Patrick Harvey	Easy Mo Bee; The LG Experience	3:59
10.	"Daddy Do"	Al Mack; Waters	The Basement Boys	6:12
11.	"Lover Lay Low"	Waters; Eric Kupper	The Basement Boys	5:48

International bonus track
No.	Title	Writer(s)	Producer(s)	Length
12.	"Piece of Lonely"	Waters; Osten Harvey Jr.	Easy Mo Bee; The LG Experience	2:49

== Personnel ==
- Drums, percussion – Teddy Douglass, Maurice Fulton, Richard Payton, Doug Smith, Sean Spencer, Jay Steinhour
- Drum programming – Maurice Fulton, Sean Spencer
- Guitars – Wayne Cooper
- Keyboards and programming – David Anthony, Hoza Clowney, Neal Conway, Charles Dockins, Maurice Fulton, Mark Harris, Richard Payton, Fruity Roberts, Doug Smith
- Vibraphone – David Bach
- Saxophone – Greg Thomas (also scatting)
- Horns – Greg Boyer, Benny Cowan
- Multi-instruments – Eric Kupper
- Backing vocals – Katreese Barnes, Kenny Hicks, Adrianne McDonald, Antoinette Roberson, Novelair Thomas, Audrey Wheeler

== Charts ==
Chart performance for Storyteller
Chart (1994)	Peak position
Australian Albums (ARIA)	55
US Billboard 200	199
US Top R&B/Hip-Hop Albums (Billboard)	73

== Certifications ==
Certifications for Storyteller
Region	Certification	Certified units/sales
United States (RIAA)	Gold	500,000^{^}
^{^} Shipments figures based on certification alone.
