= The Basement Boys =

American house music production

- Origin: Baltimore, Maryland, U.S.
- Genres: Electronic; house
- Years active: 1986–present

The Basement Boys is an American house music production team that was formed in Baltimore, Maryland, United States. The founding members are Jay Steinhour, Teddy Douglas and Thommy Davis.

== Biography ==
The Basement Boys had all previous experience as DJs in the Mid-Atlantic states and they began producing together in 1986. In 1988, the group scored a hit single together with "Love Don't Live Here Anymore," which hit No. 25 on the U.S. Dance Club Play and No. 31 on the Maxi-Singles charts. In 1989, Davis left the group and Sean "DJ Spen" Spencer (one of the writers of the Milli Vanilli hit "Girl You Know It's True") joined. Karizma was also a member of the group during the mid-to-late 1990s. DJ Spen and Karizma went on to become world-renowned house-music DJs/producers, and Spencer is head of the independent record label and production company Quantize Recordings.

The group went on to remix or produce artists such as Paula Abdul, Michael Jackson, Erykah Badu, Bob Sinclar, Crystal Waters, and Ultra Naté and began its own record label, Basement Boys Records, in 1994. In 2006, the group released an album titled The Basement Boys Present Mudfoot Jones, which was a collection of remixes of songs by a fictional drummer. Douglas continues to produce dance music and travels the world performing as DJ Teddy Douglas, often appearing with DJ Spen and Karizma.

The group's only chart entry in the UK Singles Chart occurred in February 1991, presenting Ultra Naté, on "Is It Love?" (UK No. 71).

== Production discography ==
=== Produced albums ===
- Ultra Naté (1989-1993)
  - Blue Notes in the Basement (1991)
  - One Woman's Insanity (1993)
- Crystal Waters (1991-1997)
  - Surprise (1991)
  - Storyteller (1994)
  - Crystal Waters (1997)
