= Todd Terry discography =

This is the discography of American DJ and producer Todd Terry.

== Albums ==
List of albums
| Title | Details |
|---|---|
| Ready for a New Day | Released: 1997; Label: Logic Records, Manifesto Records; Formats: CD |

== Extended plays ==
List of extended plays
| Title | Details |
|---|---|
| Just Drums | Released: March 13, 2020; Label: Freeze Records; Formats: Digital download |

== Singles ==
| Year | Single | Peak chart positions | | | | | | | | | | | | | | | Certifications | Album |
| Year | Single | US | US Dance | AUS | AUT | BEL | FIN | FRA | GER | IRE | NED | NOR | NZ | SWE | SWI | UK | Certifications | Album |
|---|---|---|---|---|---|---|---|---|---|---|---|---|---|---|---|---|---|---|
| 1988 | "Party People" | — | — | — | — | — | — | — | — | — | — | — | — | — | — | 81 | | Can You Party (as Royal House) |
| 1988 | "Can You Party" | — | — | — | — | — | — | — | — | — | — | — | — | — | — | 14 | | Can You Party (as Royal House) |
| 1988 | "Bango (To the Batmobile) / Back to the Beat" | — | 8 | — | — | — | — | — | — | — | — | — | — | — | — | 83 | | To the Batmobile Let's Go (as the Todd Terry Project) |
| 1988 | "Weekend / Just Wanna Dance" | — | 1 | — | — | — | — | — | — | — | 92 | — | — | — | — | 56 | | To the Batmobile Let's Go (as the Todd Terry Project) |
| 1989 | "The Circus" | — | 23 | — | — | — | — | — | — | — | — | — | — | — | — | — | | To the Batmobile Let's Go (as the Todd Terry Project) |
| 1989 | "Check This Out" | — | — | — | — | — | — | — | — | — | — | — | — | — | — | 96 | | (as Hardhouse) |
| 1989 | "Yeah Buddy" | — | — | — | — | — | — | — | — | — | — | — | — | — | — | 35 | | Can You Party (as Royal House) |
| 1989 | "A Better Way" (featuring Ian Star) | — | — | — | — | — | — | — | — | — | — | — | — | — | — | 86 | | Can You Party (as Royal House) |
| 1989 | "Get Funky" | — | — | — | — | — | — | — | — | — | — | — | — | — | — | 94 | | (as Royal House) |
| 1992 | ”Hear the Music" | — | 1 | — | — | — | — | — | — | — | — | — | — | — | — | — | | (as Gypsyman) |
| 1995 | "Back from the Dead" | — | — | — | — | — | — | — | — | — | — | — | — | — | — | 85 | | EP |
| 1995 | "Missing (Todd Terry Club Mix)" (by Everything but the Girl) | 2 | 2 | 2 | 6 | 2 | 11 | 2 | 1 | 3 | 5 | 5 | 14 | 3 | 2 | 3 | RIAA: Gold; ARIA: Platinum; BPI: Platinum; BVMI: Gold; SNEP: Gold | Non-album singles |
| 1995 | "Weekend '95" | — | — | — | — | — | — | — | — | — | — | — | — | — | — | 28 | | Non-album singles |
| 1995 | "A Day in the Life" | — | — | — | — | — | — | — | — | — | — | — | — | — | — | — | | A Day in the Life |
| 1996 | "Just Make That Move" (featuring Tonya Wynne) | — | — | — | — | — | — | — | — | — | — | — | — | — | — | 82 | | A Day in the Life |
| 1996 | "Driving (Todd Terry Remix)" (by Everything but the Girl) | — | — | — | — | — | — | — | — | — | — | — | — | — | — | 36 | | The Best of Everything But the Girl |
| 1996 | "Keep on Jumpin'" (featuring Martha Wash and Jocelyn Brown) | — | 1 | — | 38 | — | — | — | — | 24 | 47 | — | — | 56 | — | 8 | | Ready for a New Day |
| 1997 | "Something Goin' On" (featuring Martha Wash and Jocelyn Brown) | — | 1 | — | — | 57 | — | — | 93 | — | 64 | — | — | 43 | — | 5 | BPI: Silver | Ready for a New Day |
| 1997 | "It's Over Love" (featuring Shannon) | — | 1 | — | — | — | — | — | — | — | — | — | — | — | — | 16 | | Ready for a New Day |
| 1998 | "Reach Out Preacher" (featuring Roland Clark) (US only) | — | 48 | — | — | — | — | — | — | — | — | — | — | — | — | — | | Ready for a New Day |
| 1998 | "Ready for a New Day" (featuring Martha Wash) | — | — | — | — | — | — | — | — | — | — | — | — | — | — | 20 | | Ready for a New Day |
| 1998 | "Can You Feel It '98" (as CLS) | — | — | — | — | — | — | — | — | — | 73 | — | — | — | — | 46 | | Non-album single |
| 1999 | "Let It Ride" | — | — | — | — | — | — | — | — | — | — | — | — | — | — | 58 | | Resolutions |
| 2001 | "Raining / Enough Is Enough" | — | — | — | — | — | — | — | — | — | — | — | — | — | — | — | | Non-album singles |
| 2018 | "DJs Gotta Dance More" (with A-Trak) | — | — | — | — | — | — | — | — | — | — | — | — | — | — | — | | Non-album singles |
| 2018 | "Figure of Jazz" (with Junior Sanchez) | — | — | — | — | — | — | — | — | — | — | — | — | — | — | — | | Non-album singles |
| 2019 | "The Freak Show" | — | — | — | — | — | — | — | — | — | — | — | — | — | — | — | | Non-album singles |
| 2019 | "Substance" | — | — | — | — | — | — | — | — | — | — | — | — | — | — | — | | Non-album singles |
| 2019 | "Underground World" (featuring Selena Faider) | — | — | — | — | — | — | — | — | — | — | — | — | — | — | — | | Non-album singles |
| 2019 | "Gypsy Dance" (with House of Gypsies) | — | — | — | — | — | — | — | — | — | — | — | — | — | — | — | | Non-album singles |
| 2019 | "Dimension" | — | — | — | — | — | — | — | — | — | — | — | — | — | — | — | | Non-album singles |
| 2019 | "Go House" | — | — | — | — | — | — | — | — | — | — | — | — | — | — | — | | Non-album singles |
| 2019 | "Closer" (with Nell Shakespeare) | — | — | — | — | — | — | — | — | — | — | — | — | — | — | — | | Non-album singles |
| 2019 | "You Get Down" | — | — | — | — | — | — | — | — | — | — | — | — | — | — | — | | Non-album singles |
| 2020 | "Reaction" | — | — | — | — | — | — | — | — | — | — | — | — | — | — | — | | Non-album singles |
| 2020 | "Get It Right" | — | — | — | — | — | — | — | — | — | — | — | — | — | — | — | | Non-album singles |
| 2020 | "All of Me" (with Tobtok and Richard Judge featuring Oliver Nelson) | — | — | — | — | — | — | — | — | — | — | — | — | — | — | — | | Non-album singles |
| 2020 | "Da Bango (2020)" | — | — | — | — | — | — | — | — | — | — | — | — | — | — | — | | Non-album singles |
| 2020 | "The Rimm" | — | — | — | — | — | — | — | — | — | — | — | — | — | — | — | | Non-album singles |
| 2020 | "Jack the Tek" (with Alexander Technique) | — | — | — | — | — | — | — | — | — | — | — | — | — | — | — | | Non-album singles |
| 2020 | "Break Down" | — | — | — | — | — | — | — | — | — | — | — | — | — | — | — | | Non-album singles |
| 2020 | "Don't Think Over It" (with James Hurr and Adam Griffin) | — | — | — | — | — | — | — | — | — | — | — | — | — | — | — | | Non-album singles |
| 2020 | "Shake" | — | — | — | — | — | — | — | — | — | — | — | — | — | — | — | | Non-album singles |
| 2020 | "Black Again" | — | — | — | — | — | — | — | — | — | — | — | — | — | — | — | | Non-album singles |
| 2020 | "New Batta" (with James Hurr and Adam Griffin) | — | — | — | — | — | — | — | — | — | — | — | — | — | — | — | | Non-album singles |
| 2020 | "Keep Pumping It Up" (with Louie Vega featuring D'borah) | — | — | — | — | — | — | — | — | — | — | — | — | — | — | — | | Non-album singles |
| 2020 | "Magic" (with T. Parry featuring Ant Thomaz) | — | — | — | — | — | — | — | — | — | — | — | — | — | — | — | | Non-album singles |
| 2020 | "Choose Life" (with T. Parry featuring Ant Thomaz) | — | — | — | — | — | — | — | — | — | — | — | — | — | — | — | | Non-album singles |
| 2020 | "Set It Off" (featuring Cls) | — | — | — | — | — | — | — | — | — | — | — | — | — | — | — | | Non-album singles |
| 2020 | "House is Back" | — | — | — | — | — | — | — | — | — | — | — | — | — | — | — | | Non-album singles |
| 2020 | "You Don't Know Me" (with Jay Potter and Dancing Divaz featuring Rowetta) | — | — | — | — | — | — | — | — | — | — | — | — | — | — | — | | Rare Grooves 7 |
| 2020 | "Get Freaky" (with Tcts) | — | — | — | — | — | — | — | — | — | — | — | — | — | — | — | | Non-album singles |
| 2020 | "All That I Got" (with Robin S.) | — | — | — | — | — | — | — | — | — | — | — | — | — | — | — | | Non-album singles |
| 2020 | "Assid Shake" (with Alexander Technique featuring Jasmien Nanhekhan) | — | — | — | — | — | — | — | — | — | — | — | — | — | — | — | | Non-album singles |
| 2020 | "Jammin" | — | — | — | — | — | — | — | — | — | — | — | — | — | — | — | | Non-album singles |
"—" denotes releases that did not chart or were not released.

== Selected remixes ==
- Basement Jaxx - "Fly Life"
- Björk - "Hyperballad"
- Boston Bun - "Don't Wanna Dance"
- Garbage - "Stupid Girl"
- Kylie Minogue - "Breathe"
- Roberto Surace - "Joys"
- Tom Walker - "Better Half of Me"
- Todd Terry featuring The Raid - "Jump Up in the Air"
- Todd Terry - "Can U Dig It"
- Steve Aoki featuring Rich the Kid and ILoveMakonnen - "How Else"
- Melanie C - "Overload"
- Michael Jackson - "Stranger in Moscow"
