= Live & Remastered =

2011 box set by Ministry of Sound

Box set / live album by Larry Levan, David Morales, Todd Terry, Kenny Carpenter and Justin Berkmann
- Released: 19 September 2011
- Recorded: 1991–1994
- Venue: Ministry of Sound, London
- Genre: House; garage house
- Length: 347:18
- Label: Ministry of Sound
- Producer: Larry Levan; David Morales; Todd Terry; Kenny Carpenter; Justin Berkmann; Simon Duffy

Ministry of Sound anniversary compilations chronology
XX: Twenty Years (2011)	Live & Remastered (2011)	XX: Volume 2 (2012)

Live & Remastered (subtitled 20th Anniversary Box Set) is a box set released by the record label of British nightclub Ministry of Sound in September 2011. It was released to celebrate the 20th anniversary of the Ministry of Sound, as part of their 20:20 Project campaign, following the Ministry of Sound's foundation in 1991. Focusing on the early years of the club, the box set contains five discs, each an iconic DJ set performed live at the Ministry of Sound from 1991 to 1994. The DJ sets are mixed by New York DJ veterans Larry Levan, David Morales, Todd Terry, Kenny Carpenter and the club's British co-founder Justin Berkmann, each delivering their own house style. Between them, genres explored include deep house and garage house. The packaging for the set resembles a "flightcase" box, with all the CDs themselves in "record sleeves", whilst the discs themselves are made to look like actual vinyl LPs.

In promotion of the album, a "megamix" of songs from the album was uploaded onto by YouTube by Ministry of Sound, whilst Factmag ran a competition in which free copies were given away. The album was critically well received, who applauded the album's coverage of both the club's early years and the work of the DJs themselves. Time Out New York said the music was "great, both as time capsules and as collections of beautiful dance music." The album peaked at number 50 on the UK Compilation Chart.

== Background ==
London superclub Ministry of Sound celebrated its 20th anniversary in September 2011. In celebration, the club announced the 20:20 Project, which started in March with a multi-media exhibition about the nightclub. Further events include a three-day party in September, an international tour and the release of several commemorative DJ mix compilation albums aimed at different parts of the club's audience. They would release XX: Twenty Years, a four CD compilation of digitally mixed material, each disc covering at a different club night or compilation strand from the club's history, in November 2011, before a sequel album, XX Volume Two, was released in 2012.

Although the XX compilations were aimed at fans throughout their era, their other 20:20 Project anniversary release, Live & Remastered, was aimed more so at earlier goers to the club in its early days. With one reviewer calling it among the club's only releases "aimed at true heads in years," the club sought to create a compilation featuring live mixes of DJs playing at the club from its early days. Many of the club's DJs recorded their sets onto Digital Audio Tape (DAT), and soon enough, the club had extensive recording archive. The club chose to cull several of classic, early DAT-recorded live mixes and remaster them for a new box set. It was decided the set would five different mixes over five discs, therefore being longer than either of the XX compilations, and also the club's previous three-disc anniversary mix albums, One Half of a Whole Decade (1996) and Fifteen Years (2006). Abi Long, Alaine Wingrove, Alex Sparks, Alice Schofield, Gavin Fraser and Sarah Ioannou are credited as the set's "co-ordinators" in the "this album was brought to you by..." section in the liner notes.

== Content ==
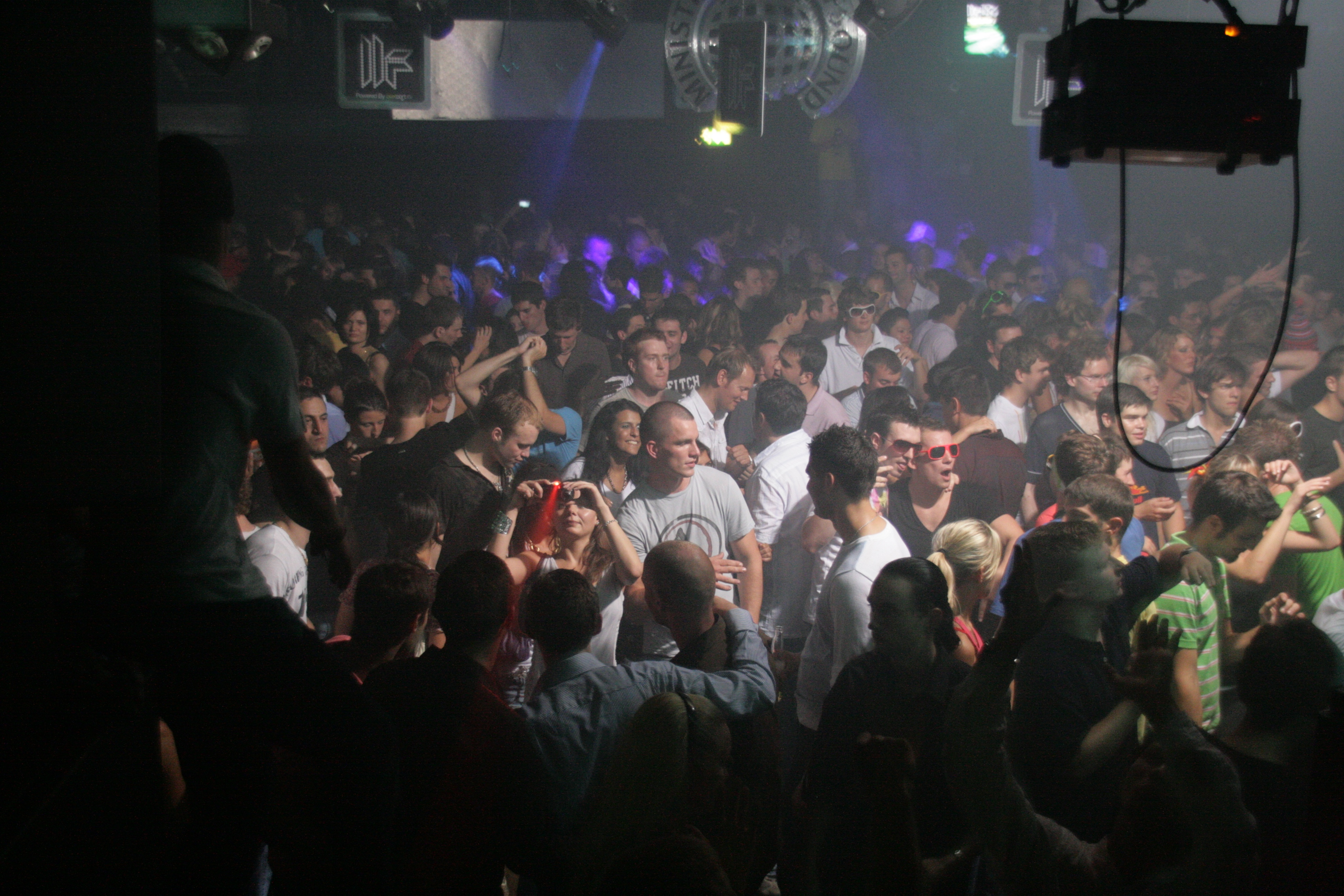
Ministry of Sound, pictured in 2008.

The set features five different, "iconic" DJ mix sets recorded live at the Ministry of Sound in the early 1990s; each mix by a different DJ, namely New York DJs Larry Levan, David Morales, Todd Terry, Kenny Carpenter and the club's British co-founder Justin Berkman, respectively. One reviewer noted the mixes date from 1991, whilst Fact Mag said the mixes date from 1990–1994, although the 1990 starting point is a mistake, the club having not opened until 1991. They had not been released before, and were only licensed and remastered for the box. All were recorded on DAT and culled from the club’s extensive recording archive. Bruce Tantum said the mixes were "lovingly restored", and called the set "something of a DJ-festishist's dream, as these sets—from the time when house was morphing from an underground cult genre to the sound of the dance floor—haven't been publicly aired since the time of their creation." Ministry of Sound tracked down the original license owners to the music on the album, described as "no mean feat in itself".

Dance music veteran Larry Levan's mix, recorded in 1991 and comprising fourteen different tracks, was one of the most sought after recordings from the venue, and is said to showcase Levan's aesthetic perfectly: "heaps of soulful vocals and melodic chords proving the strong bond between soul, R&B, gospel and house in his sets." Colin Chapman of Planet Notion said that the mix "includes literally some of the fabric of house music’s defining sound." Among the material on the disc highlighted by reviewers are the piano house of the "Dub of Doom Mix" of "Love Me Forever or Love Me Not" by Trilogy, made up of members of C+C Music Factory, which is followed by two tracks from Italian house producers Soft House Company. After an extended breakdown, "I'll Be Your Friend" by Robert Owens "picks up the groove". Gary Hines' vocal and instrumental ensemble the Sounds of Blackness feature thereafter with "The Pressure".

David Morales’ mix, recorded in the "most productive and most celebrated time" of his career, was noted by one critic for sharing similarities with Levan’s mix. Levan was one of the first to recognize Morales’ talents and the two played together regularly. However, Morales chooses tracks with a "tougher, more percussive edge" than on Levan's mix. Examples of tracks in the mix in this style include Black Sheep’s "Strobelight Honey" and Linden C.'s "Deep Beats Vol. 1". Those two tracks were pointed out by Patrice Knap of Laptop Rockers as examples of obscure tracks, who also noted "there are plenty of classics in the mix as well", naming the vocal-less version of Lil' Louis' "Club Lonely" and Inner City's "Pennies from Heaven" as examples. The end of mix include a "great choice of melodic cuts"; Degrees of Motions' "Do You Want It Right Now" and Chez Damier's "Can You Feel It".

Terry's mix, as is his style to this day, leans heavily on his own productions. Among his own tracks included are "When You Hold Me" and "Hear the Music", the latter credited under the pseudonym Gypsyemen. Carpenter's mix is in a different style, opting for deep house music, including MK's "You Brought Me Love" and Underground Solution's "Luv Dancin'" in the mix, "with time out for a disco break via "Let's Start a Dance" from Bohannon." Berkmann's mix was said to feature "absolutely classic songs", including Earth People's "Reach Up to Mars", Murk's "thumping little mix" of Deee-Lite's "Pussycat Meow", Bobby Konders, and Coco Steel and Lovebomb.

== Release ==
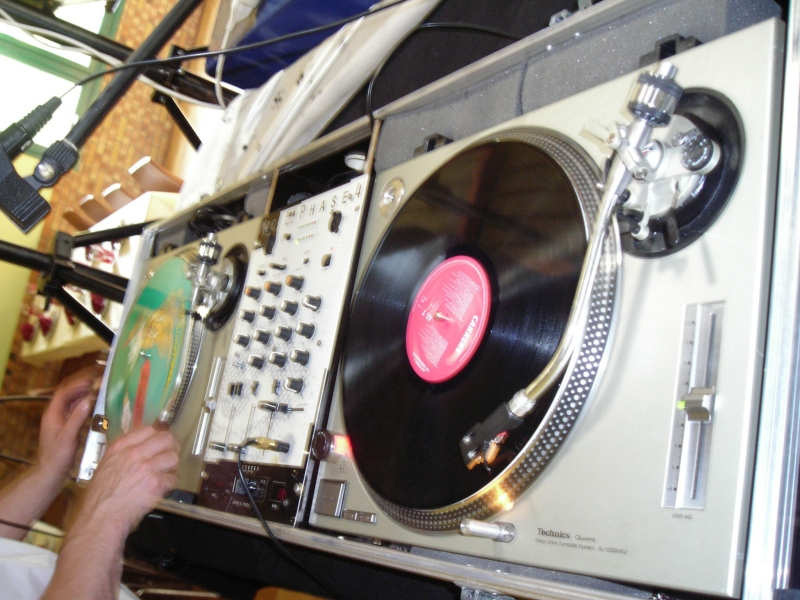
The packaging features a disc jockey motif, including imagery such as a DJ turntable like the one pictured.

The packaging is unusual, in that the box itself containing the discs resembles a "flightcase" box that a DJ would carry vinyl records in, with all the CDs themselves in miniature "record sleeves". Completing this theme, the discs themselves are also made to look like actual vinyl LPs, and as such, they are coloured black with printed grooves. PopularUK created the "album cover" design and Eskimo Square are credited for the record box illustration, whilst the packaging concept was by Andy Pelger. The album packaging uses the club's original logo used from 1991–2002. A 52-page booklet, featuring the design of a Ministry of Sound turntable on the front, is included in the set, featuring original liner notes by Bill Brewster and "post-1994" liner notes by Gareth Cooke. On certain copies, a slight mastering error occurs with the last track on disc five, the "My Soul Mix" of House Culture's "N-My Soul", where 1:46 into the track, the track number splits from track number 14 to track number 15, carrying the remaining length of the song (over four minutes) onto that track number instead.

The set was released on 19 September 2011 by Ministry of Sound's self-titled record label, two days before the club's 20th anniversary, and several months ahead of the club's other twentieth-anniversary compilations. A week earlier on 13 September, a "megamix" of music from the album was uploaded onto by YouTube by Ministry of Sound. A day afterwards on 14 September, Factmag ran a competition in which five free copies of the set were given away. For some music critics, Ministry of Sound distributed a two-disc promotional version for them to review that only featured Levan and Morales' mixes.

== Reception ==
Professional ratings
Review scores
Source	Rating
DMC World	5/5 stars
The Gap	3.5/5 stars
Laptop Rockers	(7/10) (Larry Levan mix) (8/10) (David Morales mix)
Plain and Simple	(favourable)
Planet Notion	(favourable)
Time Out New York	4/5 stars

The album was critically acclaimed. Bruce Tantum of Time Out New York rated the album four stars out of five, saying "how the club managed to license all these beloved numbers is anyone's guess—such is the reach of the modern-day Ministry, we suppose. But the world's nightlife historians, nostalgia freaks, dance-floor denizens and plain old music lovers will be extremely glad that it did." He said the mixes were "great, both as time capsules and as collections of beautiful dance music." Colin Chapman of Planet Notion was very positive in his review, saying that "if you’re piecing together a collection, or simply seeking an understanding of the music called house and especially what its story in London has been, then this double disc release will give you an insight into the heady days of early 90s house in London, before the time when dance music was fragmented into a 1,000 subgenres." He called the album "a memento and an education", saying that Ministry of Sound "was always the loveable rogue of London nightclubs, a scary-looking bull terrier with a heart of gold, and yet somehow this club with the most heavily enforced drug policy in London hosted many of the most debauched nights of all-night dancing to quality house music the city is ever likely to see."

Ben Hogwood of DMC World Magazine rated the album five stars out of five, saying that "this is a set that house heads cannot afford to miss out on. Especially as it's only 20 quid!" Stefan Niederwieser of The Gap rated the album seven out of ten. Patrice Knap of Laptop Rockers published a positive review, saying that "Live & Remastered is a fascinating time capsule to a special time in musical history when club culture was the growing force in youth culture. It surely will bring fond memories to those who, like me, used to dance the night away at the time!" Marting Hewitt of Plain and Simple said the album was "digging up the past to dish out one of the brand’s only releases aimed at true heads in years." He said that "perhaps what’s most engrossing is the quality of the sets at hand, which two decades on would put many a technologically advanced DJ to shame." Hogwood favoured Morales' mix over Levan's, saying "although it may have slightly sloppier mixing at times, the choice of tracks makes the difference."

Although the album was not television advertised like the club's usual compilations, the album debuted and peaked at number 50 on the UK Compilation Chart. In its second and final week, it fell to number 99. This unusual success followed in the path of the club's previous anniversary compilation unadvertised on television, Fifteen Years (2006), which reached number 36. The more "commercial" alternative to Live & Remastered, the highly promoted XX: Twenty Years, was naturally more of a success, peaking at number 2 in its sixth week of charting.

== Track listing ==
=== Disc one (Larry Levan) ===
1. Pleasure Pump – Fantasize Me (Dub Mix)
2. Jus' Friends – As One
3. Ceybil – Love So Special
4. Trilogy – Love Me Forever or Love Me Not (The Dub Of Doom Mix)
5. Soft House Company – What U Need
6. Soft House Company – A Little Piano
7. Robert Owens – I'll Be Your Friend
8. Sounds Of Blackness – The Pressure
9. 4 To The Bar feat. Alexis P. Suter – Slam Me Baby!
10. 4 To The Bar feat. Alexis P. Suter – Slam Me Baby! (X-Rated Mix)
11. Crystal Waters – Makin' Happy (Hurley's Happy House Mix)
12. Crystal Waters – Makin' Happy (Basement Boys Happy Club Mix)

Total length: 69:42

=== Disc two (David Morales) ===
1. Planet X – Once Upon a Dancefloor (Tony Humphries Remix)
2. Black Sheep – Strobelite Honey (Def Mix)
3. Richard Rogers – All I Want (Hitman's Dub)
4. Shafty – Deep Inside (of You) (Soul Trance Mix)
5. Lil Louis – Club Lonely (Radically Lonely Mix)
6. Linden C – Deep Beats Vol. 1 (Cee's Siren Dub)
7. Gypsymen – Hear the Music (Def Club Mix)
8. 4th Measure Men – 4 You
9. Phuture – Rise from Your Grave (Wild Pitch Mix)
10. Inner City – Pennies from Heaven (Reese Dream A Lot Mix)
11. Tevin Campbell – Goodbye (Tevin's Dub)
12. The Daou – Surrender Yourself (Ballroom Revisited)
13. Degrees Of Motion – Do You Want It Right Now (Scream Up Mix)
14. Chez Damier – Can You Feel It (MK Dub)
15. Mission Control – Outta Limits (Shelter Mix)

Total length: 63:20

=== Disc three (Todd Terry) ===
1. Gypsymen – Hear the Music (Def Club Mix)
2. Todd Terry – When You Hold Me
3. Static – Dream It (Dream Mix)
4. Station Q – That Special Melody (Da'dirtydenioFunky Mix)
5. Saint Etienne – Only Love Can Break Your Heart (Masters At Work Dub)
6. Lidell Townsell – Nu Nu (So Fine Mix)
7. Ralphi Rosario feat. Xavier Gold – U Used to Hold Me
8. Tech Nine – Slam Jam (Slam Beats)
9. The Todd Terry Project – Holdin' On (UK Master Mix)
10. The Untouchables – Take a Chance
11. The Untouchables – Yeah C'mon
12. Omniverse – Antares
13. Shawn Christopher – Don't Lose the Magic (Magic Todd Dub)
14. Todd Terry presents SAX – Special Groove
15. House of Gypsies – I Like You

Total length: 60:07

=== Disc four (Kenny Carpenter) ===
1. World Series Of Life – Spread Love
2. MK – You Brought Me Love
3. Kipper – Livin' the Nitelife (Classic Style Mix)
4. Desiya – Comin' On Strong (Spagatini Mix)
5. Cookie Watkins – I'm Attracted to You
6. Bohannon – Let's Start the Dance (Remix)
7. Third World – Now That We've Found Love (Disco Mix)
8. Little Louie & Marc Anthony – Ride on the Rhythm (Masters At Work Dub)
9. Underground Solution – Luv Dancin' (In Deep Mix)
10. Sounds Of Blackness – The Pressure Part 1 (Classic 12" Mix)
11. Chaka Khan – I Know You, I Live You
12. Natalie Cole – This Will Be (An Everlasting Love) (1991 Club Mix)

Total length: 77:06

=== Disc five (Justin Berkmann) ===
1. Cajmere feat. Dajae – Brighter Days (Underground Trance Mix)
2. Instrum – Wine (Screaming Wine Mix)
3. Funky Green Dogs – Reach for Me (Reach for the Acappella)
4. Earth People – Dance (Beats Mix)
5. Barbara Tucker – I Get Lifted (Boyd Slams The Organ Mix)
6. Bobby Konders House Rhythms – Version
7. Deee-Lite – Pussycat Meow (Murk Boys Miami Mix)
8. Jimi Polo – Express Yourself (Ministry Underground Mix)
9. Wall Of Sound – Critical (If You Only Knew) (Mood II Swing Slammin' Dub)
10. Kiwi Dreams feat. Darrell Martin – Y? (Danny's Dub)
11. Coco Steel snd Lovebomb – Feel It
12. Danell Dixon – Dance Dance (DJ Pierre's Wild Pitch Mix)
13. Blunted Dummies – House for All
14. House Culture – N-My Soul (My Soul Mix)

Total length: 77:03

== Chart positions ==
Chart (2011)	Peak position
UK Compilation Chart	50

== See also ==
- Ministry of Sound
- One Half of a Whole Decade
- Ministry of Sound Anthems
