= To the Batmobile Let's Go =

1988 album by The Todd Terry Project

Studio album by the Todd Terry Project
- Released: November 1988
- Studios: Loud House Studios, Brooklyn, New York City
- Genres: House; acid house; plunderphonics
- Length: 34:39
- Labels: Sleeping Bag; Fresh
- Producer: Todd Terry

The Todd Terry Project chronology
To the Batmobile Let's Go (1988)	This Is the New Todd Terry Project Album (1992)

Singles from Person Pitch
- 1. "Bango"/"Back to the Beat" Released: March 1988; 2. "Just Wanna Dance"/"Weekend" Released: October 1988; 3. "The Circus" Released: April 1989

To the Batmobile Let's Go is the debut album by the Todd Terry Project, an alias of American house producer Todd Terry. Released in November 1988 by Fresh Records, it followed the club success of his singles "Bango" and "Just Wanna Dance"/"Weekend", all of which feature on the album, and profiles a minimal, playful style of house music that is built on sampling and features breakbeats, experimentation with noise and elements of electro, freestyle and hip hop. The musician intended the album to represent the more commercial, Latin-styled side of his work.

Produced by Terry alone in his home studio, the record was recorded simultaneously with other projects by the producer under different pseudonyms, as was intended to be one of six albums he released under different aliases in late 1988. On release, To the Batmobile Let's Go drew attention from music critics for its intricate sound, and was named the fifth best album of 1988 by NME. A further single, "The Circus", was released in 1989, while "Weekend" became a UK Top 40 hit in 1995. In 2000, the album was re-released by Sequel Records with bonus material.

== Background ==
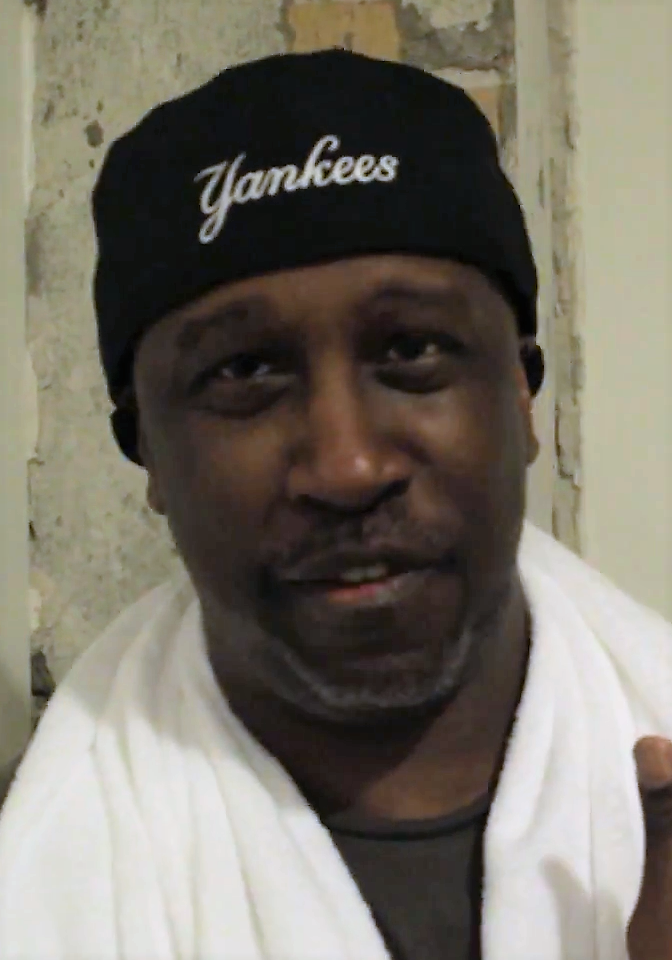
Todd Terry (2012) began The Todd Terry Project in 1988 amid releases under numerous pseudonyms.

Todd Terry began as a hip hop DJ in his native Brooklyn, New York City in the early 1980s, but became interested in house music as it evolved in New York and Chicago, and in 1987 he released his first house single, "Alright Alright", before working with rap group the Jungle Brothers on "I'll House You" (1988), a fusion of hip hop and house that helped establish Terry's following. The producer followed this with a string of club hits throughout 1988 under different aliases, including The Todd Terry Project, Royal House, Sound Design and Black Riot, while working in a style of house music that featured a strong New York flavour, mixing Latin elements, hard percussion and intricate rhythms. The use of separate pseudonyms freed the producer to "work for different labels and to get his product into the shops without competing with himself".

Terry signed the Todd Terry Project to Fresh Records, a subsidiary of Sleeping Bag Records. His first single under the alias, "Bango" was released in March 1988 while Royal House's "Can You Party" was enjoying chart success. In basing the track on Dinosaur L's "Go Bang!" (1982), Terry became the first producer to sample the music of Arthur Russell, whose sound he deemed ideal to "get snippets from", and he titled the track as an inversion of "Go Bang!". Russell was displeased that Terry had not licensed the sample and after a meeting between the two musicians, Russell received half of the publishing rights. Along with "Can You Party" and Black Riot's "A Day in the Life", both released in the same period, "Bango" helped endear the house scene to Terry's intricate production style. The single reached number eight on Billboard's Club Play Songs chart and was a popular import in the United Kingdom. After its official release there in May, it reached number 83 on the UK Singles Chart. The B-side, "Back to the Beat", used the beat of Detroit techno act Reese & Santonio's "The Sound" (1987), prompting the latter duo to respond by covering "Back to the Beat" for a single, resulting in a sales split between their record and "Bango".

In August 1988, John Leland described both tracks as having "[raided] the vocabulary of New York and Chicago house music, and [recombined] the best phrases". A double A-side single of "Just Wanna Dance" and "Weekend" appeared later in 1988. The former track samples Third World's "Now That We Found Love" (1978) while the latter is a cover of a 1978 song by Class Action. In November, the release topped the Club Play Songs chart, and reached number 56 in the UK. It also topped the Record Mirror Club Chart. Alternate club mixes of both tracks were released as a separate single. By the end of the year, Terry had become known as "Todd the God" to fans.

== Recording ==
Terry planned To the Batmobile Let's Go to be one of six albums he would release by the end of 1988 under different pseudonyms and labels, alongside those of Royal House, Black Riot, Orange Lemon, Swan Lake and Masters at Work. He said each of the records was to feature a different style, with Batmobile distinguished for being rooted in Latin music. (Note: Terry described the albums as thus in a 1988 interview: "One's quite European sounding, another's freestyle, another has a Latin feeling and with Orange Lemon there are rock music samples worked in. Royal House is a cross between rap and house and Black Riot is more R & B".) To ease the workload, Terry said he aimed to record tracks as simply as possible and would only spend two to three days creating a song. By late 1988, Terry had completed Batmobile for Sleeping Bag, Royal House's rap-influenced Can You Party for Idlers and an intended Black Riot album for Fourth Floor which took influence from soul and R&B.

Batmobile was recorded at Brooklyn's Loud House, the home studio which Terry operated in his front room, a set-up he deemed inexpensive and comfortable. The production is built on DJ techniques like sampling, mixing and scratching and track lengths are generally short. In contemporary interviews, the producer said most of his material used a four-track recorder, and that he built tracks using only samples and sounds from other records. All four previously released Todd Terry Project songs reappear on the album. Terry produced the album while Chep Nuñez, credited as Chep "Bang Out Those Edits" Nunez, provided editing on "Back to the Beat". The album was mixed by Terry at TTO Studios, Brooklyn, with mix consultants Norty Cotto and Little Louie Vega, the latter of whom has said he was the first DJ to play Terry's music – including "Bango" – to large audiences, months before their official releases.

== Composition ==
"The beat is all important, dance is the reason. Noise is intricately manipulated, stretched, squeezed, turned upside out and inside down to create one whole textured landscape. Simplicity is key, with only two instruments used, the drum machine and the sampling keyboard."

— Justin Langlands, NME

To the Batmobile Let's Go is a house album profiling Terry's more minimal and playful work of the period. Many of the tracks highlight the producer's mixture of house, freestyle and hip hop beats, and all are instrumental except for "Weekend". The album has also been described as acid house, but some reviewers reject this categorization. The music is highly uncluttered, with each track focusing on kick drums, snares and hi-hats with only occasional use of keyboards and vocals, resulting in what reviewer Push describes as a "clattering, rattling, rhythmical din which is returned to time and time again, a shifting ground into which the other inputs always, eventually, dissolve."

Music writer Justin Langlands notes how breakbeats combine with electro programming "while synth lines bounce off fragments of records", with each track utilizing "sampled sound as rhythm as an end in itself". Bruce Warren of Option writes that the tracks are largely built around "house samples, minimalist, repetitive bass lines, and drum machines that counter the bass lines with snare and hi-hat beats," with strange keyboard effects being woven throughout the tracks. Terry intended the album to highlight a more mainstream dance sound than his other projects, describing the music as "me in the studio and turning samples of sounds into music, commercial dance". Noting the album's sample-based construction, he said that this desire to "change the sample around" before recording made him unlike his contemporaries, explaining: "Most DJs just lift that sample right off the vinyl and use it. I distort it, play with it and then I throw it into a tune".

"Bango (To the Batmobile)" uses short samples of a woman's laugh for both a hook and a riff and incorporates an "Africanized percussion section" created from electro beats and samples. In addition to the Dinosaur L excerpt, the track features elements of Kraftwerk's Computer World (1981). "Weekend" features the album's most conventional song structure and contains a more prominent bass line. "You're the One (You're Bad)" is a 'brutalized' Latin hip hop track with an unrefined melody that has been compared to dancehall. A tensely jittering track, "It's Just Inhuman" features a passage where the instrumentation drops to reveal one melody, before a James Brown-style horn part appears and numerous samples briefly overlay to create a moment of heavy dissonance. "Back to the Beat" prioritizes sampled crowd noise and 'electo-yells' for musical punctuation, while "Just Wanna Dance" and "The Circus" feature what Push describes as "descending, sideways skating and warped notes and beats, the hints of melody and the rhythm strapped to a rack and bent out of shape, to the very limit of endurance." "Made by the Man" features rapping from T La Rock and snatches of orchestration, while "Sense", an atmospheric new-age instrumental, features gently fingered piano and, at 87bpm, is the album's slowest track.

== Release and promotion ==
While Royal House's Can You Party was released in October 1988, the November appearance of To the Batmobile Let's Go by Fresh and Sleeping Bag in the US made it the first album release in Terry's name. The record was promoted to dance and contemporary hit radio, and peaked at number 56 on Billboard Top Black Albums in its fifth week on the chart. In October, Terry DJed at a Sleeping Bag Records UK launch party at the Wag Club in London. The initial UK release date was to be November 21, but it was pushed back to the week of December 10. By the end of the month, it peaked at number six on the UK Independent Album Chart. A further single from the album, "The Circus", was released in the US in April 1989 with house and dub remixes, while a 1995 re-release of "Weekend" reached number 28 in the UK. The album was re-released on January 31, 2000, by British label Sequel Records with eight bonus tracks.

== Critical reception ==
Professional ratings
Review scores
Source	Rating
AllMusic	3/5 stars
NME	9/10
Record Mirror	4/5 stars

In a review for Melody Maker, Push praised To the Batmobile Let's Go for being "a percussive workout which is absurdly simple and yet highly invigorating". Considering the instrumentation to avoid tedium, even on highly minimal tracks like "The Circus", he concluded that the record proves that Terry "happens to make dance records one hell of a lot better than anybody else has done in two or three thousand days". Justin Langlands of NME applauded Terry for creating the complex music in his own home studio, and noted that the album featured the most "unsung vocal sounds" since "the heady days of Trojan compilations". He felt that "Todd Terry is not God but he is good, very good." A reviewer for Music & Media named it "Album of the Week" and believed Terry's skills lie in combining sampled backing tracks with "winning rhythm" to create "new themes". Musician wrote that the album exemplified genuine acid house and praised "Back to the Beat" for its "scattershot samples and muscular, hypnotic groove".

Frank Kogan of Spin believed that the tracks did not gel as an album, considering them to be too short "to establish their own flow", and wrote that Terry's "great little rhythm and sound effect thingies don't have the fun impact they'd have coming in the midst of a disco night". Phil Cheeseman of Record Mirror believed that the previously released tracks were the best, criticizing the album's "cod hip hop tracks" for resembling Mantronix outtakes, and "unfinished drum patterns", but praised the record's best moments for their urgency and departure "from the stifling history of black music". He believed the highlights could have been combined with those of Can You Party to create "one of the decade's best works". In another review for Record Mirror, James Hamilton felt that, due to almost half of the tracks being available on singles, the album did not contain "much that's new and essential", but added that among the "fresh cuts", "The Circus" is "certainly hot". A writer for Blues & Soul felt that while Terry's "genius" lies in his technical method, with him only ever being "as sharp as his toys", the album featured music with staying power. He praised Terry's most recent tracks for sounding the best, singling out "You're the One (You Bad)" for being "as near to an instant classic as they get."

NME ranked the album fifth in their year-end list of 1988's best albums, drawing attention to the album's complex manipulation of noise. (Note: Royal House's Can You Party featured on the list at number 30.) "Bango (To the Batmobile)" proved to be an influence on ballroom music as it began incorporating syncopated drum beats. In 1992, The Wire included the track in its list of "The Top 50 Rhythms of All Time", having been nominated by Ian Penman for the presence of "shadowy NY rhythm-twister maverick" Arthur Russell. The same year, Terry resumed The Todd Terry Project alias for a further record, This Is the New Todd Terry Project Album, which saw him delve into a purer house sound. In 2010, Chuck Eddy of Spin included To the Batmobile Let's Go in the shortlist for the magazine's list of eight essential house albums, and in 2012, he included it in the magazine's list of eight essential "plunderphonic house" albums; he wrote that the album showcases Terry mixing "detached vocal tics and jazz-rock flutes and zany bass burps, dropping science like Galileo", while deeming "Bango" to be "a missing link" between Dinosaur L's "Go Bang!" and Prince's hit "Batdance" (1989).

== Track listing ==
All songs written by Todd Terry except where noted

=== Side one ===
1. "Bango" (Terry/Arthur Russell) – 3:15
2. "Weekend" (James Calloway/Leroy Burgess) – 3:55
3. "You're the One (You Bad)" – 3:28
4. "It's Just Inhuman" – 3:30
5. "Back to the Beat" – 4:15

=== Side two ===
6. "Just Wanna Dance" – 4:15
7. "Made by the Man" – 3:34
8. "The Circus" – 4:25
9. "Sense" – 3:26

== Personnel ==
Adapted from the liner notes of To the Batmobile Let's Go

- Todd Terry – producer, mixing, writing, remix ("Weekend")
- Chep "Bang Out Those Edits" Nunez – editing ("Back to the Beat")
- King Grand – rap ("Made by the Man")
- Little Louie Vega – mix consultant
- Norty Cotto – mix consultant
- Chris Gehringer – mastering
- The Thunder Jockeys – design, photography

== See also ==
- Batmobile
