= Ready for a New Day =

Studio album by Todd Terry
- Released: 14 July 1997
- Genre: Dance; garage; house
- Label: Logic Records; Manifesto Records
- Producer: Todd Terry

Professional ratings
Review scores
Source	Rating
AllMusic	4/5 stars
Entertainment Weekly	B
The Guardian	2/5 stars
Music Week	5/5 stars

Ready for a New Day is a 1997 album by American DJ, record producer and remixer in the genre of house music Todd Terry. It features the hit singles "Keep on Jumpin'" and "Something Goin' On" featuring Martha Wash and Jocelyn Brown, and "It's Over Love" featuring Shannon, which all went to number one on the US Billboard Hot Dance Club Play chart. Terry said in an interview, "I made this record specifically for dance music lovers worldwide, for people to enjoy as songs or beats or however they want. Just to enjoy it."

== Critical reception ==
British magazine Music Week rated the album five out of five, picking it as Album of the Week.

== Track listing ==
1. "The Preacher" (featuring Roland Clark) – 1:26
2. "Something Goin' On" (featuring Martha Wash and Jocelyn Brown) – 6:56
3. "I'm Feelin' It" – 5:51
4. "Ready for a New Day" (featuring Martha Wash) – 6:21
5. "It's Over Love" (featuring Shannon) – 4:52
6. "Satisfaction Guaranteed" (featuring Bernard Fowler) – 8:01
7. "Sax Trac" – 7:00
8. "Come On Baby" – 5:49
9. "Free Yourself" – 5:53
10. "Live Without You" (featuring Jocelyn Brown) – 5:22
11. "Keep on Jumpin'" (featuring Martha Wash and Jocelyn Brown) – 5:26
12. "The Rave" – 1:49
13. "Something Goin' On" (Loop Da Loop Uptown Edit) – 3:57
14. "Keep on Jumpin'" (Rhythm Masters Thumpin' Radio Edit) (featuring Martha Wash and Jocelyn Brown) – 3:30
