= Justin Berkmann =

DJ and nightclub owner (born 1963)

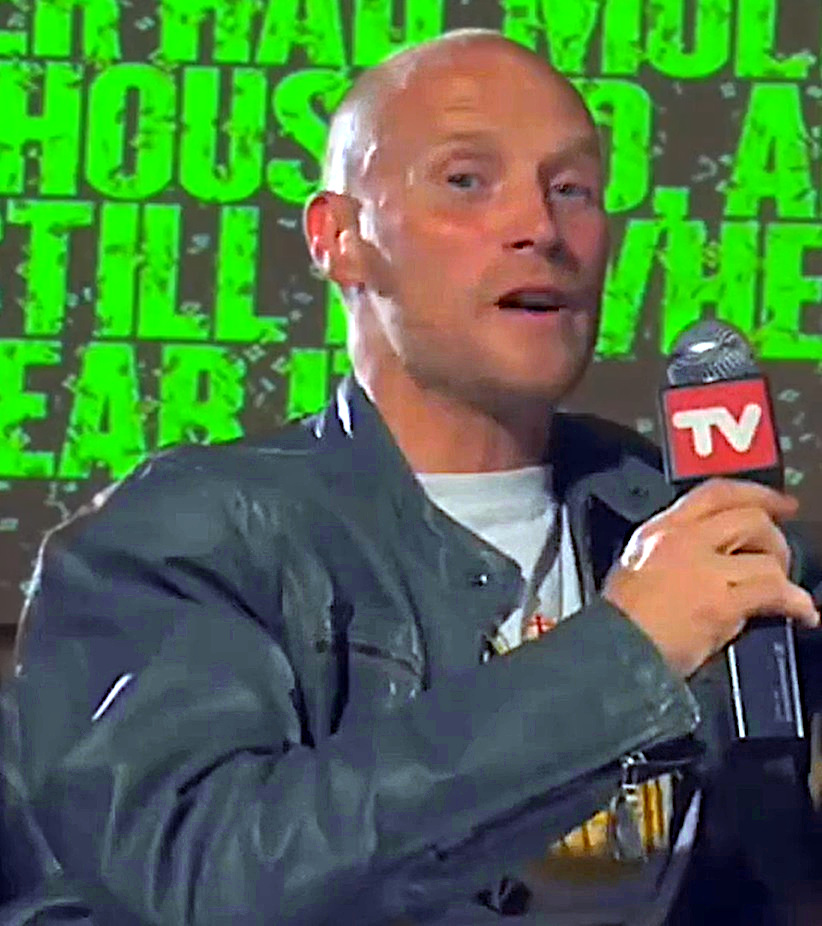
- Justin Berkmann (around 2009)
- Born: December 1963 (age 62)
- Occupation: Businessman

Justin Berkmann (born December 1963), is a DJ and nightclub owner. He is the second son of Joseph Berkmann and his second wife, Jean Berkmann (née Barwis) and younger brother of Marcus Berkmann, an author. They were both educated at Highgate School in North London.

Berkmann is the co-founder of the nightclub and brand, Ministry of Sound (now MSHK Group). Since its conception in 1991, the company has grown from a nightclub in London’s Elephant and Castle to a multi-media business. Berkmann's initial involvement was from January 1990 until May 1994, and he was resident DJ and Artistic Director during that period. He then rejoined in 2006 to build their franchise clubs in Singapore and Kuala Lumpur.

== Professional career ==
Berkmann was introduced to house music by a friend, who recommended Farley "Jackmaster" Funk's track "Funkin With the Drums Again" to him. Berkmann soon started to DJ, and in 1986 he moved to New York City, where he visited the Paradise Garage, which he described as "an amazing club. It had lights, darkness, music, quiet – everything you wanted". He returned to London in 1988, looking to create a similar venue. He then spent a year looking for a suitable site, and found a car park in Elephant and Castle, albeit with a roof covered in pigeon droppings. After joining forces with entrepreneur James Palumbo and Humphrey Waterhouse, at the end of 1989 and 21 months later they opened Ministry of Sound. Berkmann was in charge of booking the talent and being resident DJ until mid-1994. Berkmann sourced American DJ talent like Tony Humphries from the New York and Newark scenes (which centred on Club Zanzibar and the Paradise Garage). Following this, Berkmann continued to DJ. He rejoined Ministry of Sound in 2006 to assist with the design and sound installation in the Ministry of Sound, Singapore, later to become Venues Development Manager for MoS International, and co-creating the concept and design for their club in Kuala Lumpur, Malaysia with Austen Derek.

In 2011, one of his older Ministry of Sound mixes was released in Live & Remastered.
