= One Half of a Whole Decade =

1996 house music remix album / box set

Remix album / box set by CJ Mackintosh, Todd Terry, Seb Fontaine, Jon Pleased Wimmin and LTJ Bukem
- Released: 2 September 1996
- Recorded: 1990–1996
- Genres: House; garage house; breakbeat; drum and bass
- Length: 208:40; 68:16 (Rulin); 73:00 (Frisky?); 67:24 (Logical Progression)
- Label: Ministry of Sound
- Producers: Clare Gage, Grace Garcia Sutcliffe, Lynn Cosgrave, Mark Rodol, Russell Bradley, Simon Gurney, Steve Canueto

Ministry of Sound anniversary albums chronology
One Half of a Whole Decade (1996)	Fifteen Years (2006)

One Half of a Whole Decade (subtitled Five Years at the Ministry of Sound) is a DJ mix album released by the eponymous record label of house nightclub Ministry of Sound in 1996. As the album's subtitle suggests, the album celebrates and documents the first five years of the Ministry of Sound as a nightclub. It is a box set and contains three discs, the first disc, Rulin', is based around the club's Rulin' garage nights and is mixed by CJ Mackintosh and Todd Terry. The second disc, Frisky?, is based around its Frisky? house nights and is mixed by Seb Fontaine and Jon Pleased Wimmin. The third disc, Logical Progression, is mixed entirely by LTJ Bukem and is based around his Logical Progression drum and bass nights.

The album's elaborate, unusual packaging, designed by Scott Parker, is a homage to the foil packaging that computer components are sold in, complete with details such as warning details and bar codes. The album was critically acclaimed and was a commercial success, reaching number 9 on the UK Compilation Chart. The album also precedes later anniversary mix albums released by the club such as Fifteen Years and Live & Remastered.

== Background ==
The Ministry of Sound had opened as a house and garage house-orientated nightclub in Elephant & Castle, London, in September 1991, and quickly developed into a world-renowned nightclub in the ensuing years. According to club biographer, Andy Pemberton, as of mid-1996, the nightclub's "personality" was divided between the Frisky and Rulin' nights at the weekend, which played house and garage music "where the patrons swoon to the latest garage guidance counselors", and the Logical Progression nights mixed by LTJ Bukem, which featured "the hard edged underground throb of drum and bass."

The nightclub celebrated its fifth anniversary in September 1996 in numerous different ways, the most notorious being the projection of their logo onto Buckingham Palace with the message that the Ministry of Sound "lasts longer than a royal marriage," in reference to Prince Charles and Princess Diana's divorce. One of the anniversary celebrations was to release an anniversary DJ mix album, One Half of a Whole Decade, to reflect both the five years of the club's history and also its future. Clare Gage, Grace Garcia Sutcliffe, Lynn Cosgrave, Mark Rodol, Russell Bradley, Simon Gurney and Steve Canueto all conceived, produced, marketed and "agonised over" the album. "Jacko" "lovingly mastered" the entire album at Masterpiece Mastering.

== Content ==
One Half of a Whole Decade celebrates five years of the Ministry of Sound and is a document of those five years, with each disc based around a different night at the club. According to AllMusic's Jason Birchmeier, the album "attempts to present a quick summary of the massive developments made in the genre of electronic dance music in the early '90s. Of course, since this is a Ministry of Sound album, the DJs and tracks are very typical of the glamorous London club." The triple album features five different DJs compiling and mixing the tracks.

"The reaction I get in the clubs inspires me in the studio. The Ministry is probably one of only two places in the world where I can experiment. I've done eleven hours sets at the Ministry and would go for longer if the lights didn't come on."

— CJ Mackintosh on mixing his half of Rulin'.

The first disc, Rulin', is based around the club's pioneering Rulin' nights which began in 1994. These nights, which played house and garage, were and remain one of the club's flagship events, and had become "instrumental in championing American house music back in the mid-1990s." The first half is mixed by the night's resident CJ Mackintosh and its second half by Todd Terry, who had also played Rulin'.

The second disc, Frisky?, is based around the club's then-Friday night event Frisky?, described in the album's liner notes by Lucy Vignola as "a night of hedonistic, atmospheric, raunchy, burning house that smashes the north/south club divide and breaks the barriers surrounding dance music genres." The first half of the disc is mixed by the night's resident Seb Fontaine, who Vignola noted produces "the smoothest mix of upfront house around", and the second half by Jon Pleased Wimmin.

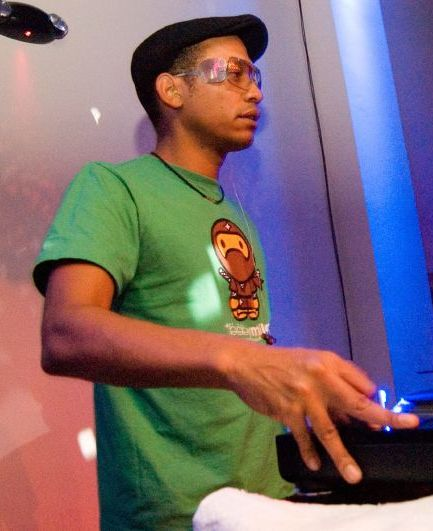
LTJ Bukem (pictured in 2006) mixed the third disc, Logical Progression

The third disc, Logical Progression, which plays as one continuous track, is mixed entirely by LTJ Bukem and is based around his Logical Progression nights at the club which themselves are based around drum and bass and "the future of dance music." According to Justin James, "the Ministry of Sound has a reputation for telling it like it is. Logical Progression tells you how it's gonna be." He described the nights as "an uncompromising selection of the latest dubplates [which take] you on a trip to a new sonic dimension of break beats and beyond. A soundtrack for the future." The disc features extracts from the 1931 film Little Caesar, and is reflective of Bukem's record label Good Looking Records, and his own identically titled compilation series, Logical Progression.

Birchmeier felt that Mackintosh, Terry and Wimmin's mixes are "very typical of what one might expect from the early to mid-'90s Ministry of Sound: accessible house music with tons of diva vocals and a light-hearted, gay mood," whereas Fontaine and Bukem's mixes "are a bit less out of the ordinary and end up being the more rewarding mixes on this triple CD." Fontaine, who was not well known at the time, mixes both forgotten "early-'90s club hits", such as Bizarre Inc's "Raise Me", and "some tracks that have been recognized as timeless classics", such as Jaydee's "Plastic Dreams", Leftfield's "Not Forgotten" and Golden Girls' "Kinetic".

== Release and reception ==
One Half of a Whole Decade was released 2 September 1996 by the Ministry of Sound record label; although the label had released multiple DJ mix albums in different series, it was the label's second standalone DJ mix album. The album was dedicated to former Ministry of Sound DJs David Cole and Larry Levan, with the album booklet saying: "Your spirit lives on." A commercial success, One Half of a Whole Decade reached number 9 on the UK Compilation Chart, and stayed on the chart for six weeks. A critical success, Jason Birchmeier of Allmusic was positive, highlighting Seb Fontaine and LTJ Bukem's mixes as the best due to their "less out of the ordinary" track listings. He noted that although Fontaine's mix "does include some forgettable early-'90s club hits such as Bizarre Inc's 'Raise Me,'" "the then-unknown DJ also lays down some tracks that have become recognized as timeless classics that sound just as good in the early part of the 21st century as they did back in the early '90s."

The album's unusual packaging, designed by the Ministry of Sound's art director Scott Parker, consists of cardboard sleeves stored in a rigid silver box, and is designed to resemble the shiny foil packets in which computer components are sold in, complete with details such as warning labels, futuristic typefaces and technical photographs. Parker explained: "We wanted to link the CD to a clothing idea and decided to pastiche the silver foil packaging for computer parts, complete with the yellow and red warning sticker and bar code. The aim is to look non-designed, that’s why I mixed up the fonts and played with the branding, adding a number of different, futuristic logos."

Parker chose not to vacuum pack the album, as the club's "arch rivals" Cream had already used the method for one of their DJ mix albums, and it "needed to be a sturdier, self-contained package", so the album's box was made by the London Fancy Box Company, and "each of the three CDs has its own sleeve." In order to "make it feel like a piece of technical equipment," Parker used photographs that Tony Stone had taken of a pressing plant, as well as "snapshots of the Ministry building." In 1997, Design Week said the album's packaging was "definitely the best CD design to come out of [Ministry of Sound]," and commented that it "exudes both glamour and a sort of nerdy techno-aesthetic, and is lovely to look at, lovely to hold… on a par with a very expensive box of chocolates."

The Logical Progression disc was later remastered and re-released as the first disc on Bukem's Logical Progression Part 1 compilation in March 2001, released on his label Good Looking Records. For this release, the individual songs were sequenced separately, rather than all on one track. The Ministry of Sound would later release other anniversary compilations for later anniversaries, namely Fifteen Years (2006), Live & Remastered (2011), XX: Twenty Years (2011) and XX: Twenty Years 2 (2012).

== Track listing ==
=== Rulin' ===
Tracks 1–6 mixed by CJ Mackintosh and tracks 7–12 mixed by Todd Terry

1. Voices - "Voices In My Mind" (Cosmack Mix) - 7:08
2. Swing Kids - "Good Feelin'" (TNT Bonus Beats) - 2:41
3. Lovebeads featuring Courtney Grey - "This Is The Only Way" (Heller+Farley Project Mix) - 3:50
4. Colourblind - "Nothing Better" (TMVS Club Mix) - 5:21
5. Urban Blues Project featuring Michael Procter - "Deliver Me" (Original Mix) - 8:08
6. Urbanized featuring Silvano – "Helpless" (Kenlou Mix) - 6:35
7. C+C Music Factory - "Pride, A Deeper Love" (Original C+C Mix) - 8:40
8. Soul System – "It's Gonna Be A Lovely Day (C+C Anthem 1)" - 3:52
9. Barbara Tucker - "Beautiful People" (Underground Network Mix) - 6:01
10. Martha Wash - "Carry On" (Tee's Freeze Mix) - 4:40
11. Robert Owens - "I'll Be Your Friend" (Original Def Club Mix) - 6:33
12. Inner City - "Pennies From Heaven" (Kevin's Tunnel Mix) - 4:47

=== Frisky? ===
Tracks 1–7 mixed by Seb Fontaine and tracks 8–14 mixed by Jon Pleased Wimmin

1. Bizarre Inc - "Raise Me" (Eon's Ascension Mix) - 4:37
2. Leftfield - "Not Forgotten" (Hard Hands Mix) - 4:07
3. Anthony White - "2Love Me Tonight" (Gomez Rock The Joint Mix) - 7:18
4. Jaydee - "Plastic Dreams" (Long Version) - 6:03
5. Mory Kante - "Yeke Yeke" (Hardfloor Dub) - 4:44
6. Golden Girls - "Kinetic" (Frank De Wulf Mix)- 3:20
7. Mankey - "Believe In Me" (Madd Ladds 12" Mix) - 9:48
8. Donna Summer - "Melody Of Love" (Epris Mix) - 5:58
9. Sunscreem - "When" (K-Klassix Mix) - 5:55
10. The Beloved - "Satellite" (Freedom Vocal) - 4:48
11. Jennifer Lucas - "Take On Higher" (Club 12") - 5:50
12. 28th Street Crew - "O" (Hi-Lux Mix) - 4:26
13. Mozaic - "Rays Of The Rising Sun" (Electric Beach Mix) - 4:37
14. Jennifer Lucas - "Take On Higher (Stringapella Reprise)" - 1:29

=== Logical Progression ===
Logical Progression is one continuous track mixed by LTJ Bukem, and is made up of these tracks.

1. LTJ Bukem - "Logical Progression" - 67:24
  1. Hieroglyphix - "Destiny"
  2. Q Project - "Solar System"
  3. Appaloosa with DJ Dream - "Night Train"
  4. P.H.D. – "Above and Beyond"
  5. Seba & Lo-Tek – "Universal Music"
  6. LTJ Bukem - "Music" (Reworked By Peshay)
  7. Peshay - "Jazz Lick"
  8. DJ Addiction – "Senses"
  9. New Balance - "Reflections"
  10. Axis - "Euphony"

== See also ==
- Live & Remastered
- Ministry of Sound Anthems
