= Musique (disco band) =

1978–1980 disco studio project

- Origin: New York City, US
- Genres: Disco
- Years active: 1978–1980
- Past members: Patrick Adams; Christine Wiltshire; Angela Howell; Gina Taylor Pickens; Mary Seymour; Jocelyn Brown

Musique was a studio project by Patrick Adams, best known for the songs "In the Bush" & "Keep on Jumping". It consisted of five singers: Christine Wiltshire, Angela Howell, Gina Taylor Pickens, Mary Seymour and Jocelyn Brown.

== Career ==
Recorded originally as a "low budget" project at Bob Blank's Blank Tape Studios in New York City (the tracking session was completed in four hours), the album Keep On Jumpin' contained only four cuts: "Keep On Jumpin'," "Summer Love," "In the Bush" and "Summer Love Theme." Adams, known for his arranging, wrote the horn section parts as the studio musicians sat waiting. Those musicians included Skip McDonald and Doug Wimbish, who were among the musicians later responsible for much of the backing work at Sugar Hill Records before teaming up to become known as Tackhead in the 1980s, collaborating with Adrian Sherwood on numerous works on his label ON-U Sound in England.

Due to the overtly sexual lyrics of "In the Bush" many radio stations banned it when it was released during 1978. Because of limited airplay it only scored No. 58 on the US Billboard Hot 100 and No. 29 on the Black Singles Chart, although it did top the Hot Dance Club Play chart along with the second single, "Keep On Jumpin'". It also reached No. 16 on the UK Singles Chart in December 1978. Their second big hit, "Keep On Jumpin'", was another club success, peaking at No. 1 on the Disco and Hot Dance Club Play chart. The song crossed over to the urban market and peaked at No. 81 on the Black Singles chart.

Musique's debut album peaked at No. 62 on the Billboard 200 chart. The vocalists on the first LP, Keep On Jumpin', were a pre-solo-career Jocelyn Brown, Angela Howell, Gina Tharps and Christine Wiltshire. On the second LP, Musique II, released in 1979, Mary Seymour, Denise Edwards and Gina Taylor took the lead vocals. Both albums were released on the Prelude Records label. "Love Massage" became another successful club hit, but failed to cross over to either the R&B or pop markets.

Musique was thought to have broken up in the early 1980s but they have continued to perform. Adams continued to be an in-demand record producer.

== Discography ==
=== Albums ===
| Year | Album | Label | Peak chart positions | |
| Year | Album | Label | US | CAN |
|---|---|---|---|---|
| 1978 | Keep On Jumpin' | Prelude Records | 62 | 47 |
| 1979 | Musique II | CBS Records | — | 92 |
"—" denotes releases that did not chart.

=== Singles ===
| Year | Single | Peak chart positions | | | | | |
| Year | Single | US Dance | US R&B | US Pop | UK | CAN | CAN Dance |
|---|---|---|---|---|---|---|---|
| 1978 | "In the Bush" | 1 | 29 | 58 | 16 | 33 | 2 |
| 1978 | "Keep on Jumpin'" | 1 | 81 | ― | ― | 90 | 1 |
| 1978 | "Summer Love Theme" | ― | ― | ― | ― | ― | ― |
| 1979 | "Love Massage" | 15 | — | ― | — | ― | ― |
| 1979 | "Number One" | — | — | ― | — | ― | ― |
| 1979 | "Good and Plenty Lover" | — | — | ― | — | ― | ― |
"—" denotes releases that did not chart or were not released in that territory.

== See also ==
- List of Billboard number-one dance club songs
- List of artists who reached number one on the U.S. Dance Club Songs chart
