= It's Over Love =

Single by Todd Terry feat. Shannon

from the album Ready for a New Day
- Released: 1997
- Genre: Dance-pop; garage
- Length: 4:53
- Label: Manifesto; Logic Records
- Songwriters: Todd Terry; Shannon
- Producer: Todd Terry

Todd Terry feat. Shannon singles chronology
"Something Goin' On (In Your Soul)" (1997)	"It's Over Love" (1997)	"Reach Out Preacher" (1998)

"It's Over Love" is song by American DJ and remixer Todd Terry featuring American singer Shannon, released on his 1997 album Ready for a New Day. It received positive reviews from music critics, topping the US Billboard Hot Dance Club Play chart in April 1998 and reaching number 16 in the UK, making it Terry's third highest charting single on the UK Singles Chart. It was also performed at the British music chart television programme Top of the Pops.

== Critical reception ==
Larry Flick from Billboard magazine wrote that Todd Terry "reminds club-land of his ability to construct catchy ditties that offer no apologies for their straightforward pop feel." He described "It's Over Love" as an "appealing single [...] bolstered by a seductively breathy vocal by disco-era diva Shannon", and also complimented its "pleasantly repetitive hook". British magazine Music Week gave it a score of four out of five, adding, "More classy, uplifting garage from Todd The God featuring big vocals by Shannon. Not as massive as 'Somethin' Going On', but pretty large by any measure." Also Chris Finan from the Record Mirror Dance Update rated the song four out of five.

== Track listing ==
No.	Title	Length
1.	"It's Over Love (Radio Edit)"	3:47
2.	"It's Over Love (Funky Green Dogs Miami Mix)"	6:00
3.	"It's Over Love (Tee's Club Mix)"	5:50
4.	"It's Over Love (Loop Da Loop Mix)"	5:37
5.	"It's Over Love (Blak N Spanish Full Vocal Mix)"	7:50
6.	"It's Over Love (Dillon & Dickins Divine Mix)"	6:55

== Charts ==
=== Weekly charts ===
Chart (1997)	Peak position
Europe (Eurochart Hot 100)	45
Scotland (OCC)	37
UK Singles (OCC)	16
UK Dance (OCC)	2
UK Club Chart (Music Week)	1
US Hot Dance Club Play (Billboard)	1

=== Year-end charts ===
Chart (1997)	Position
UK Club Chart (Music Week)	22
