= Jon Pleased Wimmin =

British electronic musician (born 1970)

- Born: Jonathan Cooper; 1970 (age 55–56)
- Origin: London, England
- Genres: House; handbag house
- Occupations: disc jockey, record producer

Jonathan Cooper (born 1970), known professionally as Jon Pleased Wimmin, is a British disc jockey and house music record producer. Often performing in full drag, Cooper had chart success with the handbag house club hit "Passion".

== Biography ==
Cooper was born in London in 1970 and went on to study Fashion Design. His career began performing in the crossdressing cabaret act "The Pleased Wimmin", which was spotted by DJ Danny Rampling who booked them to perform at club night Glam. From there Cooper moved into the DJ booth, playing records however in drag so he was ready to dance on the podium afterwards. In October 1993 Cooper opened his own club night, Pleased, in Sutton Row. In 1993, he was featured in the inaugural DJ Mag Top 100 DJs poll, an alphabetical listing of the world's most influential selectors. In 1995 Cooper's dancefloor hit, "Passion", produced by Norman Cook, topped the UK Dance Chart. Also in 1995 Cooper provided a mix for the Ministry of Sound compilation album One Half of a Whole Decade. From the mid-1990s Cooper took a c. 10-year break from performing, during which he completed a degree in Popular Music in Edinburgh. By 2011 Cooper was performing again and in 2015 releasing music including the single "Don’t Be Scared (Of Yourself)". In 2019 JPW remixed the Wow & Flutter single "Grace Jones", which received a 7/10 review rating in Mixmag.

== Discography ==
Jon Pleased Wimmin singles
Title	Artist	Year	Peak UK singles	Peak UK dance
"Passion"	Jon of the Pleased Wimmin	1995	27	1
"Give Me Strength"	Jon of the Pleased Wimmin	1996	30	5
