= The Gap (magazine) =

Austrian monthly culture magazine

- Editor: Yasmin Vihaus
- Categories: Arts & music
- Circulation: Bi-monthly (40,000)
- Publisher: Monopol
- First issue: 1997
- Country: Austria
- Based in: Vienna
- Language: Austrian German
- Website: www.thegap.at

The Gap is an Austrian free culture and music magazine.

== About ==
It is published bi-monthly, with a current print run of 40,000 copies. The Gap focuses on independent music, film, art, games, literature, politics and design.

== History ==
The Gap was founded in 1997 by Manuel Fronhofer, as a black and white fanzine that was copied in a Vienna University of Economics and Business basement. The first issue had a run of a thousand copies, and featured the band Blur on the cover.

The Gap won FM4's "Best Magazine or Blog of the Year" in 2015 and 2016, and journalist Thomas Weber calls The Gap "more milieu than magazine." The publisher is Monopol Media. In 2017, Yasmin Vihaus took over the editorial office of Amira Ben Saoud; the position was previously held by Stefan Niederwieser.

== Editors ==
Some of the magazines prominent editors are Thomas Edlinger, Andreas Klinger, Christian Köllerer, Philipp L'Heritier, Teresa Reiter, Werner Reiter, Heide Schmidt, Katharina Seidler, Peter Stuiber, Jonas Vogt, Jürgen Wallner and Barbara Zeman.

== Bibliography ==
- Der Standard Staff (2015), ""Islamisierung? Nein danke": Website von Magazin "The Gap" gehackt", Der Standard (in German)
- The Gap Staff (2015), "Portfolio", The Gap (in German)
- FM4 Staff (2015), "Exit Poll 2015 - Teil 2", FM4 (in German)
- Ternai, Matthew (26 June 2017), "Manuel Fronhofer and Yasmin Vihaus - The Gap Interview", Music Austria (in German)
- Weiser, Ulrike; Schaur-Wünsch, Teresa (14 May 2015), "The Gap: "Mehr Milieu als Magazin"", Die Presse (in German)
