= Todd Terry =

American DJ and house producer (born 1967)

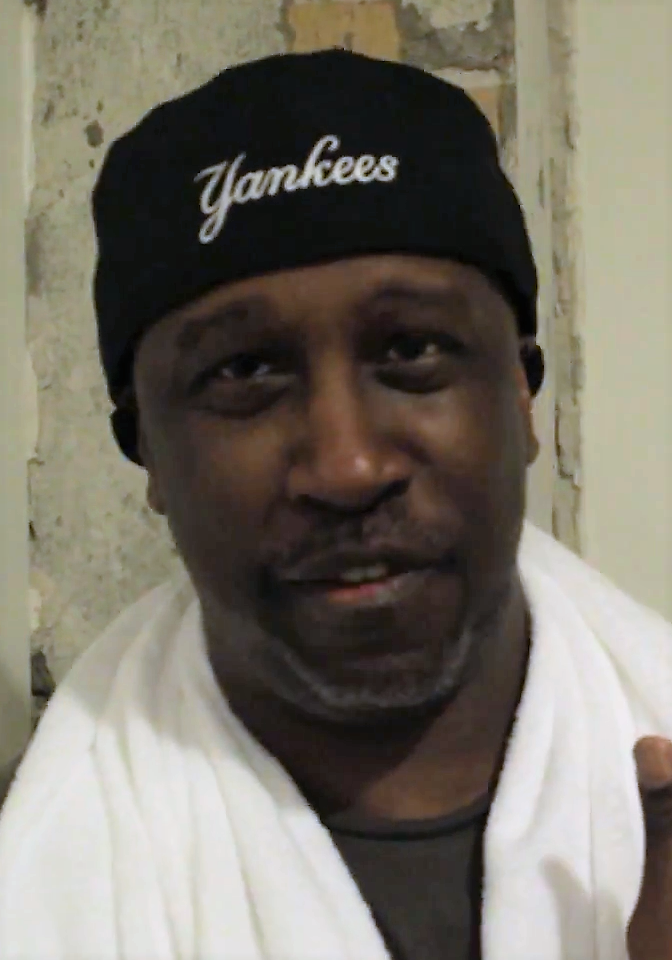
- Terry in 2012

Background information
- Also known as: T.N.T.; Black Riot; House of Gypsies; Royal House; Gypsymen; Sound Design; Tee; C.L.S.
- Born: Todd Norton Terry; April 18, 1967 (age 59); Brooklyn, New York City, U.S.
- Genres: House; hip house
- Occupations: DJ; record producer; remixer
- Instruments: Drum machine; synthesizer; electronic keyboard; sequencer
- Years active: 1987–present
- Labels: InHouse; SounDesign; Warlock; Astralwerks/Caroline/Virgin/EMI; Ministry of Sound; Tommy Boy
- Website: toddterry.com

Todd Norton Terry (born April 18, 1967) is an American DJ, record producer and remixer in the genre of house music. His productions helped define the New York house scene in the late 1980s and early 1990s, and used extensive samples that blend the sounds of classic disco, the Chicago house sound, and elements of hip-hop. He has remixed a wide variety of artists.

== Musical career ==
Todd Terry was influential in moving house music beyond the early Chicago house sound of 1984–86. He crossed the sounds of house with hip-hop breaks to create a more energized and popular sound that was able to reach commercial success outside the underground house scene. His productions extensively used samples that blended the sounds of classic disco, the Chicago house sound, and elements of hip-hop.

Terry began his career in the 1980s, DJing at parties in New York. At first, he played Italo disco and hip-hop. Later he concentrated on house music upon its mid-1980s emergence. He debuted as Masters at Work with the 12-inch "Alright Alright" (1987, Fourth Floor) and an edit from this was then included on the Chicago house vanguard compilation Jackmaster 1 (1987, D.J. International/Westside UK).

Much of Terry's early work in the late 1980s is considered a milestone in the development of house and rave music. He was responsible for releasing two of the house era's most respected crossover remixes: "I'll House You" by the Jungle Brothers (summer 1988) and "Missing" by Everything but the Girl as a re-release in October 1995. His music was a driving force within the acid house scene in the UK with many tracks such as "Back to the Beat", "Can You Party", "A Day in the Life", "Weekend", "Party People", "Yeah, Buddy" and "Dreams of Santa-Anna", released under multiple aliases including the Todd Terry Project, Royal House, Black Riot, Swan Lake, and Orange Lemon. In the summer of 1988 at the peak of the UK acid house movement, "Can You Party" under his Royal House moniker reached No. 14 in the UK.

Terry's notable releases during the 1990s include "Something Goin' On" and "Keep on Jumpin'", which were UK top-ten hits, with the vocals on both provided by Jocelyn Brown and Martha Wash.

Freestyle artist Shannon was the featured vocalist on the UK top 20 hit "It's Over Love" in 1997, which topped the Billboard Dance/Club Play Songs chart in the US, as did "Just Wanna Dance / Weekend". An album, Ready for a New Day, was also released in 1997, featuring "Something Goin' On", "Keep on Jumpin'" and "It's Over Love". It reached No. 84 on the UK Albums Chart.

In 1996, he remixed "Stranger in Moscow" for Michael Jackson.

In 1999, inspired by the drum & bass genre, Terry released Resolutions on Astralwerks Records. He also worked on the albums One Half of a Whole Decade and Live & Remastered.

Throughout his career, Terry has used several aliases including Hard House, Swan Lake, Orange Lemon, Royal House, and Black Riot. As Black Riot, "Warlock/A Day in the Life" was released as a single on the Champion label and entered the UK Singles Chart on December 3, 1988, reaching a peak position of number 68. He also recorded under the monikers CLS, Masters at Work (with Kenny "Dope" Gonzalez and "Little" Louie Vega), Dredd Stock, House of Gypsies, Limelife, Tyme Forse, and the Gypsymen (scoring a number-one Billboard Hot Dance/Club play hit in 1992 with "Hear the Music").

Terry co-produced the song "Shake" on P.M. Dawn's debut album Of the Heart, of the Soul and of the Cross: The Utopian Experience. The song ended with the repeated lyric "Everyone thank Todd Terry". He also produced "The House of Isis" from Isis' 1990 album Rebel Soul.

In October 2004, "Weekend" by the Todd Terry Project appeared in the video game Grand Theft Auto: San Andreas, playing on house music radio station SF-UR.

In 2007, Terry formed the Todd Terry All Stars, bringing Kenny Dope, DJ Sneak and Terry Hunter together to release the single "Get Down" featuring and co-written by Tara McDonald. The follow-up, "Play On", also featured McDonald and was released in 2007 on Strictly Rhythm/Defected Records and then re-released in 2009 with a remix by Eddie Thoneick.

== Record labels ==
InHouse Records was launched by Terry in 1999. It has been the vehicle through which Todd is able to release tracks to his fans without a filter.

Currently, Inhouse has over 500 commercially available tracks in the catalog including releases by House of Gypsies, Roland Clark, Shawnee Taylor, Kelly Sajda, Gypsymen, Black Riot, Leon Cormack, Lewis Beck, DJ E-Clyps and Todd Terry All Stars.

In 2000, Terry launched SoundDesign Records, the home to some of the harder tracks and artists he is working with, including releases from Danny Genius, Space Kadets, and Friscia and Lamboy.

In 2013, Terry released the album Todd Terry vs. That Trap Shitt on Tommy Boy Entertainment.

== Discography ==
Selected discography

- Can You Party (Royal House) (1988)
- To the Batmobile Let's Go (The Todd Terry Project) (1988)
- Come Over Here, Baby (Royal House) (1990)
- This Will Be Mine (Todd Terry Presents Sax) (1991)
- Todd Terry Project (The Todd Terry Project) (1992)
- Todd Terry Presents Sound Design Part II (Sound Design) (1992)
- Jumpin' (1994)
- A Day in the Life of Todd Terry (1995)
- One Half of a Whole Decade (DJ mix) (1996)
- Ready for a New Day (1997)
- Sessions Eight (DJ mix) (1997)
- Resolutions (1999)
- Culturistic (Gypsymen, 2003)
- Live & Remastered (DJ mix) (2011)

== DJ Magazine Top 100 DJs ==
Year	Position	Notes	Ref.
1997	11	New entry	
1999	65	Re-entry	

== See also ==
- List of number-one dance hits (United States)
- List of artists who reached number one on the US Dance chart
