= Hear the Music =

Single by Gypsymen
- B-side: "Bounce"
- Released: 1992
- Recorded: 1992
- Genre: Electronic, house
- Length: 5:48
- Label: E-Legal Records
- Songwriter: Todd Terry
- Producer: Todd Terry

"Hear the Music" is a song by House music DJ/Producer Todd Terry, who recorded the track under the alias Gypsymen. The single reached the top spot on Billboard's Dance Club Songs Chart in April 1992 and stayed there for one week.

The garage/house track is best known for its heavy computer tribal drum beats, non-stop scatting male vocals, female vocals chanting "I hear the music!" and the looping keyboard sampling of Machine's 1979 disco song "There But for the Grace of God Go I."

== Track listings ==
12" vinyl (US)

- A1 "Hear the Music" (Def Club Mix) (5:48)
- A2 "Hear the Music" (Def Dub Mix) (4:22)
- B "Bounce" (Wild Warped Mix) (5:55)
