= Keep On Jumpin' =

1978 single by Musique

"Keep On Jumpin'" is a song written by musician Patrick Adams and Ken Morris. This track has been remade, remixed, and sampled numerous times, but only the 1978 original by Adams's group Musique and Todd Terry's 1996 updated version with Martha Wash & Jocelyn Brown (who was also a member of Musique) reached number one on the US Billboard Hot Dance Club Play chart. Musicians on the tracks include Rich Tannenbaum on drums, Ken Mazur on guitar, and Norbert Sloley on bass. Listed here are the most notable versions.

== Original recording by Musique ==
"Keep On Jumpin'"

Single by Musique

from the album Keep On Jumpin'
- A-side: "In the Bush"
- Released: 1978
- Recorded: 1977–78
- Genre: Disco
- Length: 5:46
- Label: Prelude
- Songwriters: Patrick Adams; Ken Morris
- Producer: Patrick Adams

Musique singles chronology
| "Keep On Jumpin'" (1978) | "In the Bush" (1978) |

The original version was recorded in late-1977 by the American disco act Musique, who took it to number one on the US Billboard Hot Disco Songs chart as the double-side to "In the Bush", the latter being the act's more popular single. The song crossed over to the urban market and peaked at number 81 on the Billboard Hot Soul Songs chart. At the time the single was released, there were questions about its lyrics, which made references to drug use even though it was about having a good time partying the night away. The original is still considered a disco classic to this day and was featured on the ABC TV series Family in the 1979 episode "Disco Queen."

=== Track listing ===
- US 12" Version, 45 RPM

A. "In the Bush" (8:07)
B. "Keep On Jumpin'" (5:46)

== Beatbox version ==
"Keep On Jumpin'"

Single by Beatboxx
- Released: 1991
- Recorded: 1991
- Genre: House
- Length: 3:25
- Label: Strictly Rhythm Records
- Songwriters: Patrick Adams; Ken Morris
- Producers: Roger Sanchez; Frank Jefferson

In 1991, Roger S and Frank Jefferson (AKA Sinister Frank J), under the project name Beatboxx, recorded a techno/house/rave version. This featured a heavy piano beat and fierce female vocals by Chazzie and Paula Brion, over a sampling of Musique's "Keep On Jumpin'" chorus.

=== Track listing ===
- 12" single (US)

A1. "Keep On Jumpin'" (Subclub Mix) (7:16)
A2. "Keep On Jumpin'" (Egotrip Mix) (6:20)
B1. "Keep On Jumpin'" (N.Y. Club Mix) (6:42)
B2. "Keep On Jumpin'" (Radio Mix) (3:25)

== Todd Terry/Martha Wash/Jocelyn Brown version ==
"Keep On Jumpin'"

Single by Todd Terry featuring Martha Wash & Jocelyn Brown

from the album Ready for a New Day
- Released: June 24, 1996
- Recorded: 1996
- Genre: House
- Length: 4:02
- Label: Logic Records; RCA Records
- Songwriters: Patrick Adams; Ken Morris; Todd Terry
- Producer: Todd Terry

Todd Terry featuring Martha Wash & Jocelyn Brown singles chronology
| "Keep On Jumpin'" (1996) | "Something Goin' On (In Your Soul)" (1997) |

In 1996, Todd Terry featuring Martha Wash & Jocelyn Brown's version also reached number one on the US Billboard Hot Dance Club Play chart. This version was house oriented and the more popular of the "Keep On Jumpin'" versions, based on strength and vocal ability of Wash and Brown alone. This was the first of two back-to-back number ones on Dance Club Play chart for this collaboration between the three artists; their follow-up, "Something Goin' On (In Your Soul)", reached number one in 1997. The single was released in June 1996 by Logic and RCA Records, and was also featured on Terry's 1997 album Ready for a New Day. It was ranked number ten in a list of "The Top 10 Dance Tunes of the '90s" for Attitude in 2016. In 2017, Wash told about recording the song:

"Yes, Todd Terry was very popular at the time. The funny thing about recording "Keep on Jumpin'" was Jocelyn was in London at the time, and I was in New York. We recorded in two different studios and countries, but I guess there was still good chemistry. That's really not that unusual when it comes to recording duets, especially today."

=== Critical reception ===
Upon the release, Larry Flick from Billboard magazine wrote that here, "three titans of dance music gather for a positively electric rendition of Musique's disco-era chestnut." He added that Terry "has deftly crafted an arrangement that is sweet enough for popsters but tough enough to keep his longtime club supporters happy. And what can be said of Wash and Brown? These clubland legends don't disappoint in a pairing that shows 'em doing what they do best: vamping and belting with gospel-like vigor. Jump on it." William Stevenson from Entertainment Weekly stated that "Keep On Jumpin'" was "nearly as catchy as the 'Macarena'" and added that "this confection is certainly bouncy enough to become a staple of aerobics classes."

Music Week gave it a score of three out of five, noting the "sizzling production from Terry", and Wash's "richer-than-treacle vocals". Music Week editor Alan Jones commented, "Terry opts for vocal attack, pairing two of the most popular and enduring disco divas — Martha Wash and Jocelyn Brown — with impressive results." Dave Fowler from Muzik gave it four and a half out of five, describing the song as a "oh-so-perfectly produced package of classic house" that "is sure to keep it pumpin' for lovers of deep Americana on both sides of the pond." DJ Freshy-D from Smash Hits also gave it three out of five, calling it "wicked, but [it] deserve a place on your deck."

=== Track listing ===
- 12" promo

A1. "Keep On Jumpin'" (Tee's Freeze Mix) (9:00)
A2. "Keep On Jumpin'" (Tee's JM Mix) (8:10)
B1. "Keep On Jumpin'" (Ken Lou "Jumpin Pumpin" Mix) (6:40)
B2. "Keep On Jumpin'" (Tee's In-House Remix) (5:54)
B3. "Keep On Jumpin'" (Diva's At Work Acapella) (2:25)

- 12" Rhythm masters remixes

A1. "Keep On Jumpin'" (Rhythm Masters Vocal Mix) (6:16)
B1. "Keep On Jumpin'" (Rhythm Masters Thumpin' Mix) (6:22)
B2. "Keep On Jumpin'" (Benji Candelario's Key To Dub Mix) (6:09)

- CD maxi
1. "Keep On Jumpin'" (Tee's MT Freeze Radio) (4:02)
2. "Keep On Jumpin'" (Tee's JM Radio One) (4:02)
3. "Keep On Jumpin'" (Tee's Freeze Mix) (9:00)
4. "Keep On Jumpin'" (Tee's JM Mix) (9:00)
5. "Keep On Jumpin'" (Ken Lou "Jumpin Pumpin" Mix) (6:40)
6. "Keep On Jumpin'" (Tee's In-House Remix) (5:54)

=== Charts ===
==== Weekly charts ====
| Chart (1996) | Peak position |
|---|---|
| Austria (Ö3 Austria Top 40) | 38 |
| Canada Dance/Urban (RPM) | 2 |
| Europe (Eurochart Hot 100) | 16 |
| Europe (European Dance Radio) | 17 |
| Ireland (IRMA) | 24 |
| Italy (Musica e dischi) | 16 |
| Netherlands (Dutch Top 40 Tipparade) | 2 |
| Netherlands (Single Top 100) | 47 |
| Scotland (OCC) | 12 |
| Sweden (Sverigetopplistan) | 56 |
| UK Singles (OCC) | 8 |
| UK Dance (OCC) | 1 |
| UK Airplay (Music Week) | 19 |
| UK Club Chart (Music Week) | 1 |
| UK Pop Tip Club Chart (Music Week) | 3 |
| US Hot Dance Club Play (Billboard) | 1 |

==== Year-end charts ====
| Chart (1996) | Positions |
|---|---|
| UK Club Chart (Music Week) | 1 |
| UK Pop Tip Club Chart (Music Week) | 41 |

== Lisa Marie Experience version ==
"Keep On Jumpin'"

Single by The Lisa Marie Experience
- Released: 1996
- Recorded: 1995
- Genre: Electronic; house
- Length: 4:02
- Label: FFRR (UK); Ultra (US)
- Songwriters: Patrick Adams; Ken Morris
- Producers: Andrew 'Doc' Livingstone; Dave Lee

Music video
- "Keep On Jumpin'" on YouTube

In late 1995, the UK electronic/house duo The Lisa Marie Experience (a male duo consisting of DJs Neil Hinde & Dean Marriott) recorded a version, which after success in the clubs was officially released in early 1996 and was a number seven hit in the UK. For the white label they sampled Musique's original recording from 1977, but could not get clearance for the sample so had to recreate it. "Keep On Jumpin'" was released on the FFRR record label and was the only top-10 hit for the Lisa Marie Experience in the UK. In the US, it peaked at number three on the Billboard Hot Dance Club Play chart.

=== Critical reception ===
Pan-European magazine Music & Media wrote, "The Lisa Marie Experience Going back to Lipps Inc's 'Funky Town' but without that unforgettable rhythm guitar, that's the feeling you get from this updated "disco-inferno" with cheeky girls and wild strings." A reviewer from Music Week gave the song a score of four out of five, adding, "Massive on the club scene, this bubbling house anthem is predicted to bump and hustle its way to chart success, morphing from the underground track to household staple a la Josh Wink." Andy Beevers from the magazine's RM Dance Update gave it a full score of five out of five, noting that "their pumping house intro gives way to a guitar breakdown before the full-on disco pressure takes hold with Chris Wiltshire's infectious vocals vying for attention with those classic strings stabs."

=== Track listing ===
- CD maxi-single (US/UK)
1. "Keep On Jumpin'" (Bizarre Inc Remix Edit) – 4:02
2. "Keep On Jumpin'" (Bizarre Inc Remix) – 7:38
3. "Keep On Jumpin'" (The Lisa Marie Vocal Experience) – 8:00
4. "Keep On Jumpin'" (The Lisa Marie Sequential Dub) – 7:39
5. "Keep On Jumpin'" (The Lisa Marie Sequential) – 8:17

=== Charts ===
==== Weekly charts ====
| Chart (1996) | Peak position |
|---|---|
| Australia (ARIA) | 82 |
| Belgium (Ultratop) | 39 |
| Europe (Eurochart Hot 100) | 16 |
| Europe (European Dance Radio) | 19 |
| Ireland (IRMA) | 25 |
| Israel (Israeli Singles Chart) | 24 |
| Italy (Musica e dischi) | 18 |
| Scotland (OCC) | 9 |
| UK Singles (OCC) | 7 |
| UK Dance (OCC) | 1 |
| UK Airplay (Music Week) | 17 |
| UK Club Chart (Music Week) | 1 |
| US Hot Dance Club Play (Billboard) | 3 |

==== Year-end charts ====
| Chart (1996) | Positions |
|---|---|
| UK Singles (OCC) | 82 |
| UK Club Chart (Music Week) | 5 |

== Corenell version ==
"Keep On Jumpin'"

Single by Corenell (Vs. The Lisa Marie Experience)
- Released: 2007
- Recorded: 2007
- Genre: Electronic, house
- Length: 4:02
- Label: Gusto Records (UK)
- Songwriters: Patrick Adams; Ken Morris; Kenneth August Simmons
- Producers: Corenell; The Lisa Marie Experience

In 2007, German electronic/house remixer Corenell remixed The Lisa Marie Experience's version, which became a top 20 UK hit under the credited "Corenell vs Lisa Marie Experience". The success of the 2007 track may have been fueled by its accompanying video, which featured rival women teams playing soccer in the mud, the women become more sexually explicit as they played. The uncensored video is included in the CD maxi-single.

=== Track listing ===
- CD maxi-single (UK)
1. "Keep On Jumpin'" (Corenell Radio Edit) (2:49)
2. "Keep On Jumpin'" (The Lisa Marie Experience 2007 Radio Edit) (2:56)
3. "Keep On Jumpin'" (Corenell Extended Mix) (7:13)
4. "Keep On Jumpin'" (The Lisa Marie Experience 2007 Remix) (7:44)
5. "Keep On Jumpin'" (Fonzerelli Remix) (6:43)
6. "Keep On Jumpin'" (Electro Mix) (6:49)
7. Bonus Video: "Keep On Jumpin'" (Uncensored)
