= Just Wanna Dance / Weekend =

"Just Wanna Dance" / "Weekend"

Single by The Todd Terry Project
- Released: 1988
- Genre: House
- Label: Fresh; Sleeping Bag
- Producer: Todd Terry

"Just Wanna Dance" / "Weekend" is a 1988 release by the Todd Terry Project. "Weekend" is a cover of the 1983 release by Class Action, originally recorded by Phreek in 1978. In the U.S., "Just Wanna Dance" was released as the A-side and both songs together made it to number one on the Dance chart for one week. In the UK and Europe, "Weekend" was released as the A-side with "Just Wanna Dance" as the B-side. It peaked at No. 56 on the UK Singles Chart. In 1995, a re-release of new mixes of "Weekend" charted higher in the UK, peaking at No. 28.
