= Jocelyn Brown =

American singer (born 1950)

- Also known as: Jocelyn Shaw
- Born: Jocelyn Laurette Brown; November 25, 1950 (age 75); Kinston, North Carolina, U.S.
- Genres: Disco; house; R&B; dance; soul; gospel; funk
- Occupations: Singer; songwriter; musician; record producer
- Instruments: Vocals; piano
- Years active: 1973–present
- Labels: U.L.M.; 4th & Broadway; Vinyl Dreams; Salsoul Records; Malaco; Warner Bros.; Arista

Jocelyn Lorette Brown (born November 25, 1950), sometimes credited as Jocelyn Shaw, is an American R&B and dance singer. She has a Billboard Hot 100 chart entry solely in her name. Brown sang on 23 hit singles on the UK singles chart, eight of which have reached the top 20.

== Biography ==
=== Early life ===
Brown, who is of black heritage, was born on November 25, 1950, in Kinston, North Carolina into a musical family. Her aunt, Barbara Roy, was a singer in the female group Ecstasy, Passion & Pain while her mother, two aunts, cousin and grandmother were all accomplished singers.

She began singing with gospel choirs in church in Brooklyn and became a favourite soloist in Washington, D.C. at her uncle's church. She then left the gospel genre for a more secular form of music, singing along with a local band called 'Machine' and New York-based funk and disco group Kleeer.

=== Career ===
Jocelyn Brown further developed her musical career in the late 1970s and she worked with musicians such as Disco-Tex and the Sex-O-Lettes, Musique (Prelude Records), Dazzle, Cerrone, Inner Life, Change, Salsoul Orchestra, Luther Vandross, Brown & Brown, Hope Collective, Revanche and Incognito.

In 1980, she appeared in Bette Midler's concert film Divine Madness singing backup as a "Harlette" along with Ula Hedwig and Diva Gray.

In 1984, Brown released several singles in her own name, including "Somebody Else's Guy" (which she co-wrote and was later re-recorded in 1997 by CeCe Peniston), which reached number two on the Billboard R&B Singles chart (number 75 on the Hot 100) and became the title track of her first album (a compilation of tracks from her career to date), released that same year. Although she scored another big Dance (and minor R&B) hit two years later with the oft-sampled tune, "Love's Gonna Get You", her solo career never really took off and she continued to sing on other people's records.

She has more than twenty hits on the Hot Dance Music/Club Play chart, four of which have hit number one (not including two number one dance hits she had in the late 1970s as a guest vocalist with Patrick Adams' studio band, Musique). She continues to record house music and have chart hits in the 21st century. She toured with Boy George, as a backing vocalist, worldwide with Culture Club in 1985 and appeared on their 1986 album, From Luxury to Heartache. In 1987, she co-wrote with Boy George his top 30 United Kingdom hit, "Keep Me in Mind".

Since 1990, she has lived in London. In 1990, the line "I've got the power" was sampled from her 1985 dance hit, "Love's Gonna Get You" by electronica group Snap! for their worldwide hit, "The Power" as well as hip hop group Boogie Down Productions on their single "Love's Gonna Get'cha (Material Love)" and was the basis for the UK top 3 hit "I'm Gonna Get You" by Bizarre Inc. featuring Angie Brown. Brown also appeared on Right Said Fred's smash hit "Don't Talk Just Kiss" and in 1994, she released a duet on "No More Tears (Enough Is Enough)" with Kym Mazelle.

In 1992, George Michael sampled her song "Somebody Else's Guy" in his dance hit "Too Funky".

Brown appeared on both seasons of BBC One's celebrity singing talent show Just the Two of Us; first with TV presenter Matt Allwright (placing sixth), then with actor John Bardon from EastEnders (placing fourth). In 2006, Brown released a CD entitled Unreleased.

In 2007, Brown collaborated with the AllStars both live, at a series of music festivals in the UK, and in the studio recording of their new album, All About the Music. She sang at the funeral of gangster Joey Pyle. She also sang the United States national anthem, "The Star-Spangled Banner", at Wembley Stadium, for the first ever regular season American football game played on foreign soil, between the New York Giants and the Miami Dolphins.

In 2011, she returned to British reality television, appearing in the second series of Popstar to Operastar, but was voted out in week two, the second of two heats, after being sent home by the judging panel when placed in the bottom two of the public phone vote. She sang a 'gypsy song' from the musical Carmen, well known for its accomplished arias and performances.

In both June 2012 and 2013, Brown appeared at the open air 'Happy Days Festival' held at Imber Court in Esher, Surrey.

Brown is featured in Episode 3 of the 2024 PBS series Disco: Soundtrack of a Revolution.

== Discography ==
=== Studio albums ===
| Year | Album | Chart positions |
| Year | Album | US R&B |
|---|---|---|
| 1984 | Somebody Else's Guy | — |
| 1987 | One from the Heart | 65 |
| 1995 | Jocelyn's Classic R&B Mastercuts | — |
| 1995 | Jocelyn's Classic Reggae Mastercuts | — |
| 2006 | Unreleased | — |
| 2006 | Circles (Japan only) | — |
| 2010 | True Praise | — |
"—" denotes the album failed to chart

=== Compilation albums ===
| Year | Album | Chart positions |
| Year | Album | UK Albums |
|---|---|---|
| 1998 | The Hits | 83 |

=== Singles ===
List of solo and featuring singles with peak chart positions
| Year | Single | Peak chart positions | | | | | | | | | | | | | Certifications |
| Year | Single | US 100 | US Dance | US R&B | UK | SWI | SWE | IRE | GER | NLD | NZL | FRA | AUT | AUS | Certifications |
|---|---|---|---|---|---|---|---|---|---|---|---|---|---|---|---|
| 1978 | "Keep On Jumpin'" (vocalist for Musique) | — | 1 | 81 | — | — | — | — | — | — | — | — | — | — | |
| 1978 | "In the Bush" (vocalist for Musique) | 58 | 1 | 29 | 16 | — | 10 | — | — | — | — | — | — | — | |
| 1979 | "Walk Before You Run / You Dazzle Me!!!" (vocalist for Dazzle) | — | — | — | — | — | — | — | — | — | — | — | — | — | |
| 1979 | "I'm Caught Up (In a One Night Love Affair)" (vocalist for Inner Life) | — | 7 | 22 | — | — | — | — | — | — | — | — | — | — | |
| 1980 | "I Want to Give You Me" (vocalist for Inner Life) | — | — | — | — | — | — | — | — | — | — | — | — | — | |
| 1980 | "Sadie (She Smokes)" (Joe Bataan feat. Jocelyn Brown) | — | — | — | — | — | — | — | — | 33 | — | — | — | — | |
| 1980 | "It's a Girl's Affair" (vocalist for Change) | — | — | — | — | — | — | — | — | — | — | — | — | — | |
| 1981 | "You Are the One" (guest vocalist for Cerrone) | — | 56 | — | — | — | — | — | — | — | — | — | — | — | |
| 1981 | "My Look" (guest vocalist for Cerrone) | — | — | — | — | — | — | — | — | — | — | — | — | — | |
| 1981 | "Letter to My Mother" (guest vocalist for Cerrone) | — | — | — | — | — | — | — | — | — | — | — | — | — | |
| 1981 | "Someone to Love" (guest vocalist for Cerrone) | — | — | — | — | — | — | — | — | — | — | — | — | — | |
| 1981 | "Hooked on You" (guest vocalist for Cerrone) | — | — | — | — | — | — | — | — | — | — | — | — | — | |
| 1981 | "Cherry Tree" (guest vocalist for Cerrone) | — | — | — | — | — | — | — | — | — | — | — | — | — | |
| 1981 | "Took Me So Long" (guest vocalist for Cerrone) | — | — | — | — | — | — | — | — | — | — | — | — | — | |
| 1981 | "Ain't No Mountain High Enough" (vocalist for Inner Life) | — | 20 | — | — | — | — | — | — | — | — | — | — | — | |
| 1981 | "(Knock Out) Let's Go Another Round / Live It Up" (vocalist for Inner Life) | — | — | — | — | — | — | — | — | — | — | — | — | — | |
| 1981 | "If I Can't Have Your Love" (Jocelyn Brown) | — | — | — | — | — | — | — | — | — | — | — | — | — | |
| 1982 | "Take Some Time Out (for Love)" (Salsoul Orchestra feat. Jocelyn Brown) | — | 46 | — | — | — | — | — | — | — | — | — | — | — | |
| 1982 | "Moment of My Life" (vocalist for Inner Life) | — | 15 | — | — | — | — | — | — | — | — | — | — | — | |
| 1982 | "I Like It Like That" (vocalist for Inner Life) | — | 40 | — | — | — | — | — | — | — | — | — | — | — | |
| 1983 | "No Way" (vocalist for Inner Life) | — | — | 93 | — | — | — | — | — | — | — | — | — | — | |
| 1984 | "Let's Change It Up" (vocalist for Inner Life) | — | — | — | — | — | — | — | — | — | — | — | — | — | |
| 1984 | "Too Through" (Jocelyn Brown with The Bad Girls) | — | — | — | — | — | — | — | — | — | — | — | — | — | |
| 1984 | "Hands Off" (Jocelyn Brown) | — | 53 | — | — | — | — | — | — | — | — | — | — | — | |
| 1984 | "I'm Gonna Make It to the Top / It's You" (Jocelyn Brown) | — | — | — | — | — | — | — | — | — | — | — | — | — | |
| 1984 | "Somebody Else's Guy" (Jocelyn Brown) | 75 | 13 | 2 | 13 | — | — | 16 | — | 31 | 33 | — | — | — | BPI: Gold |
| 1984 | "I Wish You Would" (Jocelyn Brown) | — | 51 | 49 | 51 | — | — | — | — | — | — | — | — | — | |
| 1984 | "Picking Up Promises" (Jocelyn Brown) | — | — | — | — | — | — | — | — | — | — | — | — | — | |
| 1984 | "So in Love" (Raven feat. Jocelyn Brown) | — | — | — | — | — | — | — | — | — | — | — | — | — | |
| 1985 | "Love's Gonna Get You" (Jocelyn Brown) | — | 1 | 38 | 70 | — | — | — | — | — | — | — | — | — | |
| 1986 | "Your Love" (vocalist for Inner Life) | — | — | — | — | — | — | — | — | — | — | — | — | — | |
| 1986 | "Got You Dancing" (Karisma feat. Jocelyn Brown) | — | — | — | — | — | — | — | — | — | — | — | — | — | |
| 1987 | "Caught in the Act" (Jocelyn Brown) | — | — | 94 | — | — | — | — | — | — | — | — | — | — | |
| 1987 | "Whatever Satisfies You" (Jocelyn Brown) | — | — | 72 | — | — | — | — | — | — | — | — | — | — | |
| 1987 | "Ego Maniac" (Jocelyn Brown) | — | 5 | 38 | 82 | — | — | — | — | — | — | — | — | — | |
| 1988 | "R-U-Lonely" (Jocelyn Brown) | — | — | 32 | — | — | — | — | — | — | — | — | — | — | |
| 1989 | "Mysterious" (Phil Edwards feat. Jocelyn Brown) | — | — | — | — | — | — | — | — | — | — | — | — | — | |
| 1990 | "Freedom" (Jocelyn Brown) | — | — | — | 83 | — | — | — | — | — | — | — | — | — | |
| 1990 | "Feel Like Making Love" (Heatwave feat. Jocelyn Brown) | — | — | — | 90 | — | — | — | — | 45 | — | — | — | — | |
| 1990 | "Turn Out the Lights" (Jocelyn Brown & Oliver Cheatham) | — | — | 70 | — | — | — | — | — | — | — | — | — | — | |
| 1991 | "Mindbuster" (Jocelyn Brown & Oliver Cheatham) | — | — | — | — | — | — | — | — | — | — | — | — | — | |
| 1991 | "Gypsy Rhythm" (Raúl Orellana feat. Jocelyn Brown) | — | — | — | — | — | — | — | — | 8 | — | — | — | — | |
| 1991 | "Always There" (vocalist for Incognito) | — | 31 | 33 | 6 | 8 | 19 | 25 | 20 | 2 | — | 48 | — | — | |
| 1991 | "Got to Get Away" (Off-Shore feat. Jocelyn Brown) | — | — | — | — | — | — | — | — | — | — | — | — | — | |
| 1991 | "I Wanna Know What Love Is" (Jocelyn Brown feat. Voodoo Possee) | — | — | — | — | — | — | — | — | — | — | — | — | — | |
| 1991 | "Don't Talk Just Kiss" (Right Said Fred feat. Jocelyn Brown) | 76 | 8 | — | 3 | 7 | 4 | 8 | 2 | 3 | 16 | — | 5 | 18 | |
| 1991 | "She Got Soul" (Jamestown feat. Jocelyn Brown) | — | — | — | 57 | — | — | — | — | 26 | — | — | — | — | |
| 1992 | "My Sun Will Get You" (Raúl Orellana feat. Jocelyn Brown) | — | — | — | — | — | — | — | — | — | — | — | — | — | |
| 1992 | "Take Me Up" (Sonic Surfers feat. Jocelyn Brown) | — | — | — | 61 | — | — | — | — | 10 | — | — | — | — | |
| 1992 | "Got Me Dancin" (Charismatic feat. Jocelyn Brown) | — | — | — | — | — | — | — | — | — | — | — | — | — | |
| 1993 | "Permanent Love" (Jason Rebello feat. Jocelyn Brown) | — | — | — | 81 | — | — | — | — | — | — | — | — | — | |
| 1993 | "Magic Man (Abracadabra)" (KC Flightt feat. Jocelyn Brown) | — | — | — | — | — | — | — | — | — | — | — | — | — | |
| 1993 | "Can't Stop the Rhythm" (Masters At Work feat. Jocelyn Brown) | — | — | — | — | — | — | — | — | — | — | — | — | — | |
| 1994 | "No More Tears (Enough Is Enough)" (Kym Mazelle & Jocelyn Brown) | — | — | — | 13 | — | — | 19 | — | — | — | — | — | 48 | |
| 1994 | "Gimme All Your Lovin'" (Jocelyn Brown & Kym Mazelle) | — | — | — | 22 | — | — | — | — | — | — | — | — | — | |
| 1995 | "Black Skinned, Blue Eyed Boy" (B-Project feat. Jocelyn Brown) | — | — | — | — | — | — | — | — | — | — | — | — | — | |
| 1996 | "Keep On Jumpin'" (Todd Terry feat. Martha Wash & Jocelyn Brown) | — | 1 | — | 8 | 17 | 56 | — | — | 47 | — | — | 38 | — | |
| 1997 | "Somethin' Going On" (Todd Terry feat. Martha Wash & Jocelyn Brown) | — | 1 | — | 5 | 28 | 43 | — | 93 | 64 | — | — | — | — | |
| 1997 | "It's Alright, I Feel It!" (Nuyorican Soul feat. Jocelyn Brown) | — | 3 | — | 26 | — | — | — | — | — | — | — | — | — | |
| 1997 | "I Am the Black Gold of the Sun" (Nuyorican Soul feat. Jocelyn Brown) | — | — | — | 31 | — | — | — | — | — | — | — | — | — | |
| 1997 | "Special Love" (Jestofunk feat. Jocelyn Brown) | — | — | — | — | — | — | — | — | — | — | — | — | — | |
| 1997 | "Happiness" (Kamasutra feat. Jocelyn Brown) | — | 5 | — | 45 | — | — | — | — | — | — | — | — | — | |
| 1997 | "Real Man" (Melodie MC feat. Jocelyn Brown) | — | — | — | — | — | 19 | — | — | — | — | — | — | — | |
| 1997 | "Give Me Back Your Love" (Melodie MC feat. Jocelyn Brown) | — | — | — | — | — | — | — | — | — | — | — | — | — | |
| 1997 | "Embrace the Power" (Melodie MC feat. Jocelyn Brown) | — | — | — | — | — | 51 | — | — | — | — | — | — | — | |
| 1997 | "Free" (A.K. Soul feat. Jocelyn Brown) | — | — | — | — | — | — | — | — | — | — | — | — | — | |
| 1998 | "Ain't No Mountain High Enough" (Jocelyn Brown) | — | 36 | — | 35 | — | — | — | — | — | — | — | — | — | |
| 1998 | "Fun" (Da Mob feat. Jocelyn Brown) | — | 1 | — | 33 | — | — | — | — | — | — | — | — | — | |
| 1998 | "Show You Love" (A.K. Soul feat. Jocelyn Brown) | — | 21 | — | — | — | — | — | — | — | — | — | — | 49 | |
| 1999 | "I Believe" (Jamestown feat. Jocelyn Brown) | — | — | — | 62 | — | — | — | — | — | — | — | — | — | |
| 1999 | "It's All Good" (Da Mob feat. Jocelyn Brown) | — | — | — | 54 | — | — | — | — | — | — | — | — | — | |
| 1999 | "Nights Over Egypt" (Incognito feat. Maysa Leak & Jocelyn Brown) | — | 38 | — | 56 | — | — | — | — | — | — | — | — | — | |
| 1999 | "Believe" (Ministers De-La-Funk feat. Jocelyn Brown) | — | — | — | 42 | — | — | — | — | — | — | 24 | — | — | |
| 2000 | "Stand Up" (Magic Cucumbers feat. Jocelyn Brown & Connie Harvey) | — | — | — | — | — | — | — | — | — | — | — | — | — | |
| 2001 | "Goodlife" (Brown & Brown as Jocelyn Brown & Karl Brown ) | — | — | — | — | — | — | — | — | — | — | — | — | — | |
| 2002 | "Suspicious" (Stitch feat. Jocelyn Brown) | — | — | — | — | — | — | — | — | — | — | — | — | — | |
| 2002 | "I'm a Woman" (Cassius and Jocelyn Brown) | — | — | — | — | 63 | — | — | — | — | — | — | — | — | |
| 2002 | "That's How Good Your Love Is" (Il Padrinos feat. Jocelyn Brown) | — | — | — | 54 | — | — | — | — | — | — | — | — | — | |
| 2002 | "Monday, Tuesday... Laissez-moi danser" (2005 remix of Dalida song by Cerrone, samples vocals from Jocelyn Brown) | — | — | — | — | — | — | — | — | — | — | — | — | — | |
| 2003 | "A Better World" (AgeHa feat. Jocelyn Brown & Loleatta Holloway) | — | — | — | — | — | — | — | — | — | — | — | — | — | |
| 2003 | "Hold Me Up" (Glory feat. Jocelyn Brown) | — | — | — | — | — | — | — | — | — | — | — | — | — | |
| 2004 | "Riding on the Wings" (Motiv 8 feat. Jocelyn Brown) | — | — | — | 44 | — | — | — | — | — | — | — | — | — | |
| 2005 | "Beautiful Day" (Hardage feat. Jocelyn Brown) | — | — | — | — | — | — | — | — | — | — | — | — | — | |
| 2005 | "Sing" (Roni Size feat. Jocelyn Brown) | — | — | — | — | — | — | — | — | — | — | — | — | — | |
| 2007 | "I Just Wanna Make Love to You" (Population feat. Jocelyn Brown) | — | — | — | — | — | — | — | — | — | — | — | — | — | |
| 2007 | "I Don't Want You Anymore" (Noferini & Kortezman feat. Jocelyn Brown) | — | — | — | — | — | — | — | — | — | — | — | — | — | |
| 2007 | "All About the Music" (The AllStars Collective feat. Jocelyn Brown) | — | — | — | — | — | — | — | — | — | — | — | — | — | |
| 2008 | "The Lollipop" (Delicious Allstars feat. Jocelyn Brown) | — | — | — | — | — | — | — | — | — | — | — | — | — | |
| 2009 | "Love Alibi" (Camboso feat. Jocelyn Brown) | — | — | — | — | — | — | — | — | — | — | — | — | — | |
| 2010 | "Set Me Free" (Blame feat. Jocelyn Brown) | — | — | — | — | — | — | — | — | — | — | — | — | — | |
| 2011 | "In the Middle" (Jocelyn Brown & Soulpersona) | — | — | — | — | — | — | — | — | — | — | — | — | — | |
"—" denotes releases that did not chart or were not released in that territory.

== See also ==
- List of Billboard number-one dance club songs
- List of artists who reached number one on the U.S. Dance Club Songs chart
- List of disco artists (F–K)
- List of house music artists
