= Something Goin' On (In Your Soul) =

1997 single by Todd Terry

- European variant

Single by Todd Terry featuring Martha Wash and Jocelyn Brown

from the album Ready for a New Day
- Released: June 30, 1997
- Genre: House; disco
- Length: 4:02
- Label: Logic; RCA
- Songwriter: Todd Terry
- Producer: Todd Terry

Todd Terry singles chronology
"Keep on Jumpin'" (1996)	"Something Goin' On (In Your Soul)" (1997)	"Keep on Jumpin'" (Steve Mac remix) (2005)

Music video
- "Something Goin' On (In Your Soul)" on YouTube

"Something Goin' On (In Your Soul)" is a song by American record producer Todd Terry featuring American singers Martha Wash and Jocelyn Brown on vocals. It was released in June 1997, by Logic and RCA Records, as the second single from Terry's debut album, Ready for a New Day (1997). The song peaked within the top 5 in both Italy and the UK, peaking at number four and five, respectively. It also reached number-one on the UK Dance Singles Chart and the US Billboard Dance Club Play chart. The original song title was shortened to "Something Goin’ On" upon its release as a single, even though the full title was listed on the album. The accompanying music video was directed by Brett Turnbull.

As the follow-up to their successful version of "Keep on Jumpin'", which also reached number-one on the Hot Dance Club Play chart in 1996, it would become the second of two back to back number-ones on the chart for this collaboration between the three artists.

== Critical reception ==
Fact magazine ranked "Something Goin' On (In Your Soul)" number 21 in their list of "21 Diva-House Belters That Still Sound Incredible" in 2014. Joe Muggs wrote, "There is DEFINITELY something wrong with you if you don’t get why this is incredible." Music Week gave the song a score of four out of five, stating that "the master is back with a surefire hit. Featuring exquisite guest vocals from Jocelyn Brown and Martha Wash, this catchy number will get any dancefloor busy and blare from radios in the coming weeks."

Daisy & Havoc from RM gave it a full score of five out of five and named it Tune of the Week, writing, "Starting with old-style spoken praise for house music, this track is a spirit-raising, feel-good number that moves along at quite a pace, helped by an emotional but not overdone sung vocal." A reviewer from Sunday Mirror commented, "Todd and the boys Keep on jumpin' with a fat disco number the like of which hasn't been seen since the last one they did. Serious diva vocals come courtesy of Jocelyn Brown and Martha Wash. Fine." David Sinclair from The Times described it as an "infectious dancefloor stomp."

== Track listings ==
- US maxi-CD
1. "Something Goin' On" (Tee's radio edit) (3:35)
2. "Something Goin' On" (Tee's Freeze edit with Preacher) (3:35)
3. "Something Goin' On" (The DFA edit) (3:28)
4. "Something Goin' On" (Tee's Freeze mix with Preacher) (8:12)
5. "Something Goin' On" (Rhythm Masters mix) (8:35)
6. "Something Goin' On" (Vission & Lorimer Sweepin Stylee!) (5:59)
- UK 12-inch

A1. "Something Goin' On" (Tee's remix)
A2. "Something Goin' On" (Rhythm Masters Master dub mix)
B1. "Something Goin' On" (Loop Da Loop Uptown mix)
B2. "Something Goin' On" (Loop Da Loop Downtown mix)

- US 12-inch

A1. "Something Goin' On" (Tee's Freeze mix with Preacher) (8:12)
A2. "Something Goin' On" (The DFA mix) (6:38)
A3. "Something Goin' On" (Preacher vocal) (1:26)
B1. "Something Goin' On" (Rhythm Masters mix) (8:35)
B2. "Something Goin' On" (Vission & Lorimer Sweepin Style) (5:59)

== Charts ==
=== Weekly charts ===
Chart (1997)	Peak position
Belgium (Ultratip Bubbling Under Flanders)	7
Canada Dance/Urban (RPM)	9
Europe (Eurochart Hot 100)	14
Germany (GfK)	93
Israel (Israeli Singles Chart)	22
Italy (Musica e dischi)	4
Netherlands (Dutch Top 40 Tipparade)	5
Netherlands (Single Top 100)	64
Scottish Singles Sales (Official Charts)	14
Sweden (Sverigetopplistan)	43
UK Singles (Official Charts)	5
UK Dance (Official Charts)	1
UK Club Chart (Music Week)	1
US Dance Club Songs (Billboard)	1
US Dance Singles Sales (Billboard)	4

=== Year-end charts ===
Chart (1997)	Position
UK Club Chart (Music Week)	7
UK Singles (OCC)	74
US Dance Club Play (Billboard)	14
US Maxi-Singles Sales (Billboard)	22
