= Piña (surname) =

- Language: Spanish

Origin
- Meaning: "Pineapple"
- Region of origin: México, Venezuela, Dominican Republic, Chile, Cuba and Perú

Other names
- Variant form: Peña

Piña is a Spanish language surname, literally meaning "pineapple". While the exact origin of the surname is unknown, it may have originated around the mountainous regions of León or in Galicia.

Notable people with the surname include:

- Aarón Piña Mora (1914–2009), Mexican painter and muralist
- Antonio Velasco Piña (1935–2020), Mexican novelist
- Blanca Estela Piña Gudiño (born 1955), Mexican teacher and politician
- Blanca Ibáñez Piña (born 1947), Venezuelan politician
- Celso Piña (1953–2019), Mexican singer and composer
- César Gelabert Piña (born 2000), Spanish footballer
- Cristina Piña (born 1949), Argentine poet and scholar
- Daniel Piña (born 2001), Chilean footballer
- Dulce Piña (born 1966), Dominican judoka
- Eduardo Agramonte Piña (1841–1872), Cuban revolutionary and politician
- Francisco Piña (born 1998), Chilean footballer
- Gilberto García Piña (born 1969), Dominican judoka
- Gonzalo Piña Ludueña (1545–1600), Spanish conquistador
- Horacio Piña (born 1945), Mexican baseball player
- Inocencio Ibarra Piña (born 1967), Mexican politician
- Íñigo Piña (born 1994), Spanish footballer
- Joaquín Piña Batllevell (1930–2013), Spanish-Argentine Catholic bishop
- Jonathan Piña (born 1989), Mexican footballer
- José Piña (born 1996), Venezuelan footballer
- José Luis Espinosa Piña (born 1968), Mexican politician
- Karol Itzitery Piña Cisneros (born 1999), Mexican actress and singer
- Laura Fernández Piña (born 1971), Mexican marketer and politician
- Laura Piña Olmedo (born 1959), Mexican politician
- Manny Piña (born 1987), Mexican baseball player
- Manolita Piña (1883–1994), Spanish-Uruguayan painter
- Mariano Piña Olaya (born 1933), Mexican politician
- Melesio Piña (born 1948), Mexican sprinter
- Norma Lucía Piña Hernández (born 1960), Mexican lawyer and educator
- Porfirio Piña (born 1965), Dominican entrepreneur and director
- Robinson Piña (born 1998), Dominican baseball player
- Queco Piña (born 1980), Spanish footballer
- Sulennis Piña Vega (born 1981), Cuban chess player
- Tinabeth Piña, American journalist
- Verónica Juárez Piña (born 1971), Mexican politician

== See also ==
- Piña (disambiguation)
