= Juárez (surname) =

Juárez is a patronymic Spanish surname of Germanic origin, and an alternate spelling of the surname Suárez. In the Visigothic language it meant "son of Suero", which in turn derives from "surhari" or Southern army. Notable people with the surname include:

- Adrián Juárez Jiménez (born 1978), Mexican politician
- Agustín Juárez (cyclist) (born 1943), Mexican cyclist
- Agustín Juárez (footballer) (born 2005), Argentine footballer
- Ana Luz Juárez Alejo, Mexican lawyer and politician
- Axel Juárez (born 1990), Argentine footballer
- Benito Juárez (1806–1872), Mexican president and Supreme Court magistrate
- Carlos Arturo Juárez (1916–2010), Argentine politician
- Carlos Eleodoro Juárez (born 1938), Argentine chess player
- Daniel Juárez (born 1975), Argentine footballer
- Efraín Juárez (born 1988), Mexican footballer
- Elio Juárez (born 1942), Uruguayan cyclist
- Ernesto Juárez (born 1934), Argentine retired footballer
- Fernando Juárez (born 1998), Argentine professional footballer
- Giselle Juárez (field hockey) (born 1991), Argentine field hockey player
- Giselle Juarez (softball) (born 1998), American softball player
- Heidy Juárez (born 1977), Guatemalan taekwondo practitioner
- Iván Juárez (born 1976), Argentine footballer
- Lourdes Juárez (born 1986), Mexican professional boxer
- Margo Juarez (born 1958), American politician from Nebraska
- Mariana Juárez (born 1980), Mexican professional boxer
- Miguel Juárez (1931–1982), Argentine footballer
- Natalia Juárez (born 1995), Mexican actress
- Rocky Juarez (born 1980), American former professional boxer
- Rubén Juárez (1947–2010), Argentine musician
- Verónica Juárez Piña (born 1971), Mexican politician
