= WCDB =

WCDB Albany 90.9FM
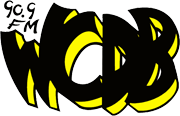
- Albany, New York; United States
- Broadcast area: New York's Capital District
- Frequency: 90.9 MHz
- Branding: Capital Districts Best

Programming
- Format: Freeform; Alternative

Ownership
- Owner: State University of New York

History
- Former call signs: WSUA
- Call sign meaning: We are the Capital District's Best

Technical information
- Licensing authority: FCC
- Facility ID: 63125
- Class: A
- ERP: 100 watts
- HAAT: 64.0 meters
- Transmitter coordinates: 42°41′12.50″N 73°49′12.60″W

Links
- Public license information: Albany 90.9FM Public file; LMS
- Webcast: Yes
- Website: wcdb.fm

WCDB is a college radio station located at The University at Albany in Albany, New York. WCDB currently broadcasts at 90.9 FM with a signal covering the Capital District and reaching parts of Western Massachusetts. The station is staffed completely by students and student alumni, operating on a 24/7 schedule. WCDB's programming includes a wide range of alternative music programs. The station is available worldwide via streaming on their website.

== History as WSUA ==
The first traces of campus radio activity at the Albany campus appeared in the 1940s when the University Radio Council was formed. This organization made initial plans for the creation of a campus station tentatively called WCFA (College For Teachers, UAlbany's first incarnation) and WSCA. In 1962, the college became a University in the State University of New York system. WSUA debuted on February 22, 1963 as a "carrier current" AM radio station, with the broadcast transmissions propagated via and confined to the electrical wiring of the college campus. The frequency was 640 kHz. At the time, a school newspaper account specified the station's power at eight watts.

WSUA was located in a janitor's closet in Brubacher Hall in what is today called the "Downtown campus." At the time, the format consisted of news, sports and music in the jazz, classical and Broadway vein. A Top 40 format was later adopted. In the mid 1960s, WSUA upgraded their studio space to the basement of Brubacher Hall, where space for more studios and record storage was available. Around this time, the station's carrier current signal was initiated at the new "Uptown" campus. The electrical wires used to carry the signal often imparted a buzzing sound on the transmission. In 1975, the station began to use the slogan "Buzz Along With Us" on some promotional items to acknowledge this fact.

A more progressive type of rock music format was introduced in 1968 and would later become the dominant format, displacing the Top 40 music. At the same time, WSUA began sports coverage of the Great Danes basketball and football teams. The station also featured a daily news digest called Earwitness News beginning in 1973. By mandate of the Student Association, the station was required to use this specific ID for its top of the hour announcement: "WSUA Albany, subsidized completely by student tax paid to the Student Association of the State University of New York at Albany.

== History as WCDB ==
WCDB moved from the AM dial on to the FM dial on March 1, 1978 with the song "Born To Run" by Bruce Springsteen. The station operated with 10 watts of power in FM stereo. In 1981 the State University of New York submitted to the FCC an application to increase the station's transmitter power to 100 watts, which was approved on March 1, 1982. The first song played at the new higher power was "Rock and Roll" by the Velvet Underground.

== Notable alumni ==
- Brian Lehrer - CUNY TV

== Live music performances ==
WCDB has hosted numerous on-air band performances over the years. Notable performances include: The Kinks (1979); Television (1979); Joe Strummer (1984); Fugazi (1993); Cymbals Eat Guitars (2010); The Music Tapes (2010); Wye Oak (2011); Colour Revolt (2011); Avi Buffalo (2012).

== See also ==
- College radio
- List of college radio stations in the United States
