= Brian Lehrer =

American radio broadcaster (born 1952)

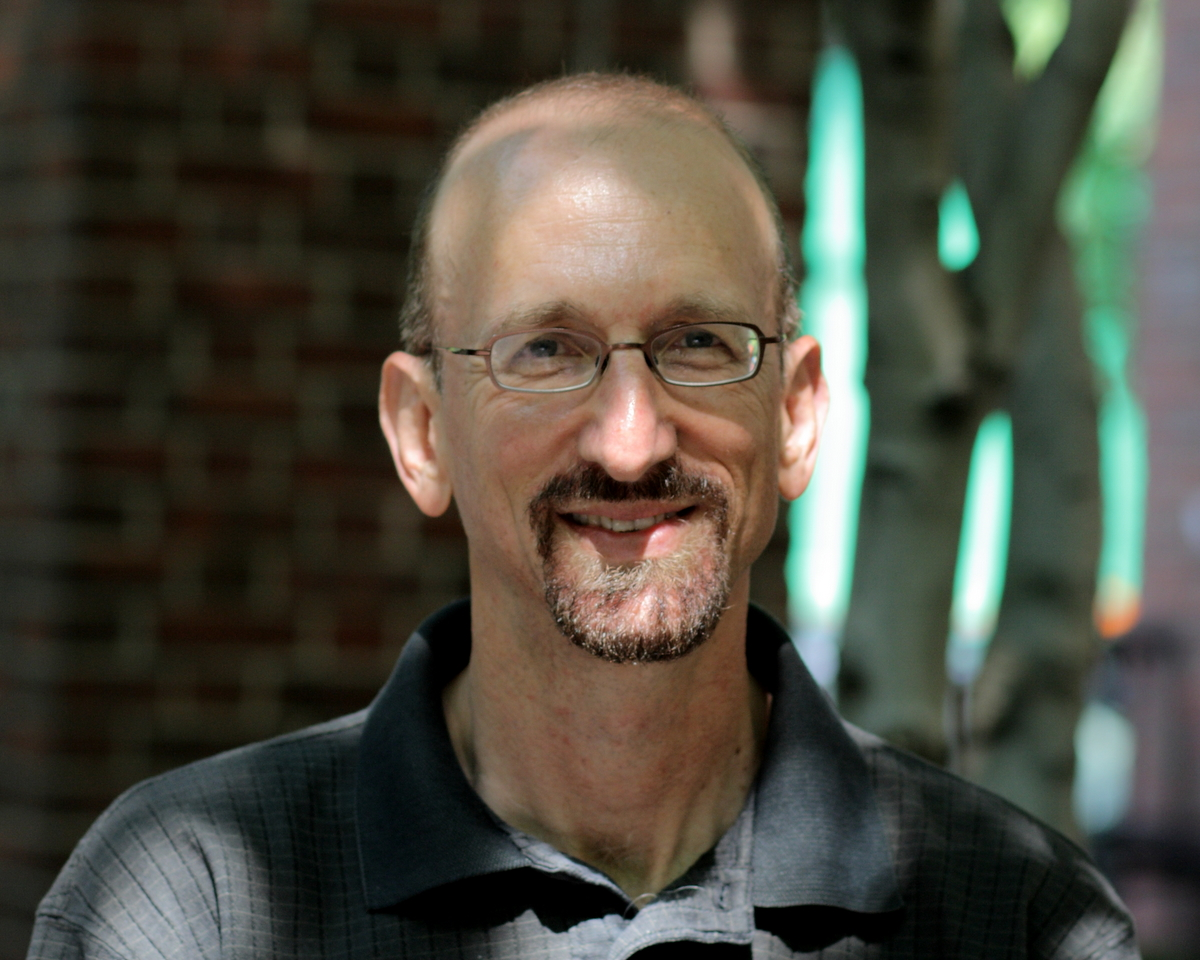
- Lehrer in 2009
- Born: October 5, 1952 (age 73); New York City, New York, U.S.
- Education: University at Albany, SUNY (BA); Ohio State University (MS); Columbia University (MPH)
- Children: 2

Brian Lehrer (born October 5, 1952) is an American radio talk show host on New York City's public radio station WNYC. His daily two-hour 2007 Peabody Award-winning program, The Brian Lehrer Show, features interviews with newsmakers and experts about current events and social issues. Lehrer was formerly an anchor and reporter for NBC Radio Networks and has been in broadcast journalism for over 30 years.

== Early life and education ==
Lehrer was born in Queens and grew up in the neighborhood of Bayside. He went to Bayside High School. His parents, both children of Jewish immigrants from Poland, grew up in the South Bronx and met in high school.

Lehrer obtained B.A. degrees in Music and Mass Communications from the State University of New York at Albany. While a student there, he hosted a radio program on the college radio station WSUA which has since become WCDB Albany. Lehrer also hosted radio programs in Columbus, Ohio, and Norfolk, Virginia.

He holds a master's degree in journalism from Ohio State University and a Master of Public Health degree from the Columbia University Mailman School of Public Health. In 2012, he was awarded an honorary Doctor of Letters from Montclair State University.

== Career ==
=== The Brian Lehrer Show ===
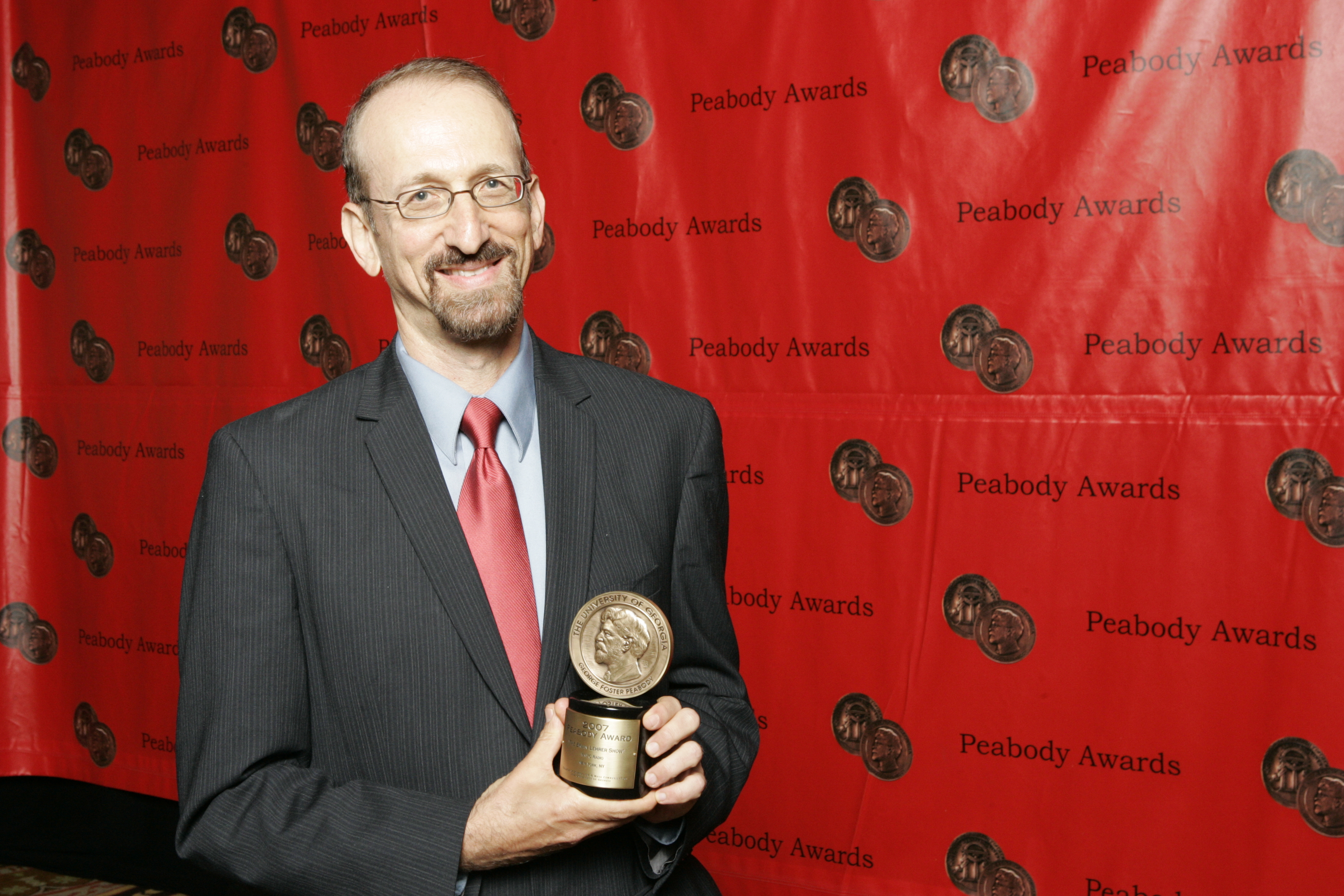
Brian Lehrer at the 67th Annual Peabody Awards in May 2008

Lehrer has been hosting his show, originally called On the Line, since its inception in 1989. The show was conceived in part as a response to the 1987 abolishment of the Fairness Doctrine, which required broadcast license holders to portray controversial topics in a balanced and equitable manner.

The format is interviews with newsmakers, combined with listener phone calls. Newsmakers are local, national and international, often authors on book tours, or metropolitan area politicians, including both of New York's senators, and most congress, state and city representatives from the New York, New Jersey and Connecticut area. Sometimes guests are less-famous individuals affected by the news, like Brooklyn residents on the site of giant housing developments or neighbors of noisy Manhattan night clubs.

From 2016 until 2021, Lehrer hosted the weekly "Ask the Mayor" segment, where the mayor of New York City directly answers questions from callers. The monthly segment, "Speak to the Speaker", which hosted City Council Speaker Corey Johnson, provided another opportunity for callers to engage with local politicians.

Frequent topics are housing, health care, transportation, education, and other government functions; the arts; the experience of living in New York and the surrounding area; and international affairs, such as the Iraq war or Israel/Palestinian conflict, particularly from a New York perspective. Lehrer's programs often use The New York Times for leads and guests. He tries to maintain a balance between issues as they affect listeners and "horse-race" pundit discussions of politics.

Prominent political guests include Barack Obama, Hillary Clinton, Mitch McConnell, and Kellyanne Conway. Other guests also include musician Wynton Marsalis, author Margaret Atwood, author Junot Diaz, filmmaker Judd Apatow, writer Chimamanda Ngozi Adichie, and baseball player Yogi Berra, among others.

The show won a 2007 Peabody Award "for facilitating reasoned conversation about critical issues and opening it up to everyone within earshot."

=== CUNY TV shows ===
Lehrer hosted a cable TV talk show called BrianLehrer.TV (formerly Brian Lehrer Live) on CUNY TV (channel 75 on New York City cable systems) from 2005 to 2015. In 2009 the show was nominated for a regional New York Emmy Award. He hosted POTUS 2017 from September 2015–August 2017. From October 2017–May 2018, Lehrer hosted the weekly CUNY TV show "Brian Talks New York".

=== Other work ===
Lehrer's op-ed pieces have appeared in The New York Times, The New York Sun, Newsday, and the New York Daily News, and on Slate. His WNYC commentaries are also distributed globally on the NPR website.

Lehrer was a questioner in the WABC-TV New York City Mayoral debates in 1997, 2001, and 2005. Since 1997, Lehrer has been a moderator in every New York City mayoral election.

He has appeared on television as a commentator on CNN, New York 1, WNET Channel 13, and CNNfn, and hosted public affairs shows on WPXN-TV and WNET from 1990 to 1998.

Lehrer was the recipient of the New York Associated Press (NYAP) Broadcasters "Best Interview" Award in 2000 for an interview with a rape survivor, and in 2001 for his role as moderator on NYC radio of the only mayoral primary debate between Michael Bloomberg and Herman Badillo. Since 2000, Lehrer has been awarded seven "Best Interview" awards from the NYAP. During his tenure as host of NPR's On the Media, the national program was named "Best Weekly Show" by the Public Radio News Directors in 1999.

He currently moderates several major public forums, including The Nation vs. The Economist series and the Harper's Forum series, and has moderated or hosted major events for the American Museum of Natural History and Westinghouse Science Foundation, among others.

== Personal life ==
As of 2020, Lehrer resides in Inwood with his two sons, Nathan and Simon. His wife, Victoria Ann Dennis, died in February 2014.

== Awards and nominations ==
- 1999 Public Radio News Directors, "Best Weekly Show" winner, On the Media
- New York State Associated Press Broadcaster Awards (7 total "Best Interview" awards since 2000)
  - 2011 – Brian Lehrer and Megan Ryan, The Brian Lehrer Show, "Daniel Ellsberg on Wikileaks"
  - 2012 – Brian Lehrer and Megan Ryan, "The Brian Lehrer Show's interview with Supreme Court Justice Breyer"
- 2007 George Foster Peabody Award, "Radio That Builds Community Rather Than Divides" winner, The Brian Lehrer Show
- 2009 New York Emmy Awards, "Interview/Discussion" nomination, Brian Lehrer Live: Focus on the City (April 3, 2008)
- 2011 New York Press Club Journalism Awards, "Best Web Exclusive Content" winner, Anna Sale, Jody Avirgan, Kathleen Ehrlich, Brian Lehrer, John Keefe, Dean Cappello, "Election Coverage, It's a Free Country"
- 2012 Garden State Journalists Association Awards
  - Radio Feature, The Brian Lehrer Show, "The Brian Lehrer Show: Live from New Jersey"
  - Talk Radio, The Brian Lehrer Show, "The Business of Bringing Business to New Jersey"
- 2014 Garden State Journalists Association Award "1st Place Talk Radio Show" winner, The Brian Lehrer Show, "Debating Newark School Reform" (March 21, 2013)
- 2017 Edward R. Murrow Awards, Excellence in Social Media, "3 New Ways to Cover the Election (including #HamiltonDebates, #BruceTheDebate and Audio Tweets in the Christie Tracker)" Newsroom Elections Team, The Brian Lehrer Show and editor Nancy Solomon

== See also ==
- New Yorkers in journalism
