= Same-sex marriage in the State of Mexico =

Same-sex marriage has been legal in the State of Mexico since 2 November 2022. On 11 October 2022, the Congress of the State of Mexico voted 50–16 with 6 abstentions to pass a bill legalizing same-sex marriage. It was signed by Governor Alfredo del Mazo Maza, published in the official state gazette on 1 November, and took effect the next day. The State of Mexico was the 29th Mexican state to open marriage to same-sex couples.

== Legal history ==
=== Background ===
The Supreme Court of Justice of the Nation ruled on 12 June 2015 that state bans on same-sex marriage are unconstitutional nationwide. The court's ruling is considered a "jurisprudential thesis" and did not invalidate state laws, meaning that same-sex couples denied the right to marry would still have to seek individual amparos in court. The ruling standardized the procedures for judges and courts throughout Mexico to approve all applications for same-sex marriages and made the approval mandatory. Specifically, the court ruled that bans on same-sex marriage violate Articles 1 and 4 of the Constitution of Mexico. Article 1 of the Constitution states:

Any form of discrimination, based on ethnic or national origin, gender, age, disabilities, social status, medical conditions, religion, opinions, sexual orientation, marital status, or any other form, which violates the human dignity or seeks to annul or diminish the rights and freedoms of the people, is prohibited. (Note: In some official and indigenous languages of the State of Mexico: Spanish: Queda prohibida toda discriminación motivada por origen étnico o nacional, el género, la edad, las discapacidades, la condición social, las condiciones de salud, la religión, las opiniones, las preferencias sexuales, el estado civil o cualquier otra que atente contra la dignidad humana y tenga por objeto anular o menoscabar los derechos y libertades de las personas.; Nahuatl: Majmauilo nochi tlaixpinaualistli ika maseualtsitsi katli euani tomexkotlali, siuatl uan tlakatl, ininxiui, uan katli amo ueli motekipanolia, maseualmej, melauatlajkayotl, teotlanejnewili, tlatsintokilistli, kualtiloni pakilistli, sanimanyotl nemili o akinijki kichiuas tlaixpanoli ika maseual tlaixpinauali uan kipia tamantli tlaixkotonali o tlaijtlakoli tlen tlamelaualistli uan tlamakixtiistli ika maseualmej.; Otomi: Hingi tsa da t’utsa ya jä’i num’u ngu ra mengu ka ya hnini hñätho, ne ha ra ñ’oho ua ra m’ehñä, ra jeya gä mets’i, ha nxotho ra jä’i, hä ua hin’ä bojä, ha hingi dathi, ne te ma nijä pa, xa nthäti ua hin’ä ne ha ua ma n’a ngu embi t’uni ra m’ui gä mu’i di thegi di mu’i ra n’yo ya jä’i.; Mazahua: Dya ra soo ra zob’ꞹji yo tee k’o b’ꞹb’ꞹmejñiñi o meb’ondo, kjo ngeje b’ejña o b’ezo, jango nzi kjɇɇpɇs’iji, yo tee k’o dya soo ra pɇpjiji, jange b’ꞹb’ꞹji, ko sødye o iyo, ko paa kja nitsjimi o iyo, soo ra ngichiji nuk’ua neji, ko neb’ezo o nerixu, k’o chꞹntꞹo iyo ñe texe k’o dya ra jyeziji ra tsjaa yo tee, dya ra soo ra dɇmbi kjats’e k’o nee ja ra mimiji kuatꞹk’a Taxiskuama.; Matlatzinca: Xarepari ne kjajɇ naga por ki kanuta meyop’ojti, ki matepɇti ki kan wemja o wexuwi, rokjɇch’e, t’ani matepɇti, mukjakja ronchjori, mukjakja rontebajya, robejeta, t’ani ro’ini, t’ani ronawi, ki rontetenye ‘o xako ‘o munitjɇ ki romatucho’ochikjowi ixta murawi ki natuxchi botutebajya tesokjowi.; Ocuiltec: Ñulnwe ñulpruhibiru ndyetso ñediscriminacio por okua milndañjɇ, por wendu ya wechu, por ñekjɇnye temindutefbiñjɇ, por mube’i, por okua mukjolo, por okua mukjot’enzo, por t’utata wandukulia, por temindumø, por temindubafti wendu jo wechu, por yanutejiamti ya t’akua ya mula npieru tutso ndyetso ñebet’a jo tutefby nproposito patudespreciatu ñelderechu jo nliberta pa ñebet’a.)

On 15 February 2013, four same-sex couples applied to marry at the civil registry office in Toluca. Officials refused to issue them marriage licenses, and the couples consequently filed an amparo in court. On 24 June 2013, a federal judge granted the amparo, ruling that the articles of the Civil Code that prohibited same-sex couples from marrying were discriminatory. The state appealed the decision. An appellate court declared itself unable to resolve the dispute in January 2014, and the case was heard by the Supreme Court in November 2014. On 25 February 2015, the Supreme Court granted the amparo, and declared the Civil Code unconstitutional and discriminatory. A lesbian couple, one of the four plaintiff couples, became the first same-sex couple to marry in the state on 18 April 2015. Two more amparos were granted in Toluca in late October 2017. One of the two couples married in December 2017, making them the first male couple to marry in the state. By December 2017, six same-sex couples had been granted amparos.

=== Early bills ===
A popular initiative for the legalization of civil unions was introduced to the Congress of the State of Mexico in 2008, but stalled and was never voted on. In 2010, an initiative to legalize same-sex marriage was introduced to Congress, but also stalled. After three years of legislative inaction, Deputy Octavio Martínez Vargas from the Party of the Democratic Revolution (PRD) introduced a same-sex marriage bill to Congress in 2013. In January 2014, Martínez Vargas said that the PRD would continue to press for the legalization of same-sex marriage. In January 2015, Israfil Filós Real, the president of the Vulnerable Groups Civil Association (Grupos Vulnerables Asociación Civil), called on lawmakers to pass the same-sex marriage bill. Subsequently, Governor Eruviel Ávila Villegas submitted a new marriage bill, while the PRD submitted a proposal to legalize adoption by same-sex couples on 5 March 2015. A Congress session to discuss Governor Ávila Villegas' bill was scheduled for 31 May 2016. However, two political parties, the National Action Party (PAN) and the New Alliance Party (PANAL), requested more time to study the proposal. José Manzur Quiroga, the Secretary General of Government (Secretaría de Gobierno), said the bill would be voted on during Congress' following extraordinary legislative session, though eventually no vote took place. The July 2018 elections resulted in the National Regeneration Movement (MORENA), which supports the legalization of same-sex marriage, winning the majority of legislative seats in Congress. Nevertheless, progress on the legalization of same-sex marriage continued to stall for the following four years.

=== Passage of legislation in 2022 ===
Another same-sex marriage bill was introduced to Congress in 2022 by Deputy Daniel Sibaja González from the National Regeneration Movement. A vote in a Congress committee was scheduled for the second week of September 2022. The vote was delayed until 23 September, and a plenary vote was scheduled for October. On 23 September, the committee vote was postponed to the following week. The committee approved the bill on 27 September. A final, plenary vote was scheduled for Tuesday, 11 October 2022. The bill passed Congress on 11 October by 50 votes to 16. It was published in the official state journal on 1 November, following Governor Alfredo del Mazo Maza's signature, and took effect the next day. The first same-sex marriage performed under the new law occurred on 2 November in Coacalco de Berriozábal between Leticia Chávez Rivera and María Pérez Vilchis. Article 4bis of the Civil Code was amended to read: Marriage is an institution of a public nature and social interest, through which two people, freely and voluntarily, decide to share a state of life in pursuit of their personal and conjugal fulfillment, under the formalities and solemnities established by this Code. (Note: Spanish: El matrimonio es una institución de carácter público e interés social, por medio de la cual dos personas de manera libre y voluntaria deciden compartir un estado de vida para la búsqueda de su realización personal y conyugal, bajo las formalidades y solemnidades que establezca el presente Código.)

11 October 2022 vote in the Congress
Party	Voted for	Voted against	Abstained	Absent (Did not vote)
National Regeneration Movement	29: Emiliano Aguirre Cruz; Elba Aldana Duarte; Mónica Alvárez Nemer; Anais Burgos Hernández; Azucena Cisneros Coss; Max Correa Hernández; Marco Cruz Cruz; Faustino de la Cruz Pérez; María de la Rosa Mendoza; Lourdes Delgado Flores; María Elizalde Vázquez; Adrián Galicia Salceda; Dionicio García Sánchez; Beatriz García Villegas; Valentín González Bautista; Nazario Gutiérrez Martínez; Luz Hernández Bermúdez; Maurilio Hernández González; Mario Juárez Rodríguez; Karina Labastida Sotelo; Alicia Mercado Moreno; Edith Mercado Torres; Isaac Montoya Marquéz; Camilo Murillo Zavala; Yesica Rojas Hernández; Abraham Saroné Campos; Daniel Sibaja González; Gerardo Ulloa Pérez; Rosa Zetina González	–	–	–
Institutional Revolutionary Party	5: Myriam Cárdenas Rojas; Enrique Jacob Rocha; Paola Jiménez Hernández; María Sanchéz Holguín; Guillermo Zamacona Urquiza	16: María Aguilar Sánchez; Karla Aguilar Talavera; Braulio Alvaréz Jasso; Jaime Cervantes Sanchéz; Ivan Esquer Cruz; Gretel González Aguirre; Aurora González Ledezma; Fernando González Mejía; Ana Guadarrama Santamaría; Jésus Izquierdo Rojas; Jésus Moreno Mercado; Evelyn Osornio Jiménez; David Parra Sanchéz; Alfredo Quiróz Fuentes; Elias Rescala Jiménez; Mario Santana Carbajal	1: Lilia Urbina Salazar	1: Cristina Sanchéz Coronel
National Action Party	4: Román Cortes Luego; Miriam Escalona Piña; Francisco Rojas Cano; Francisco Santos Arreola	–	5: María Dávila Vargas; Luis Fierro Clima; Martha Moya Bastón; Ingrid Schemelensky Castro; Enrique Vargas del Villar	2: Adrián Juárez Jiménez; Gerardo Lamas Pombo
Labor Party	3: Silvia Barbenera Maldonado; María Franco Arpero; Sergio García Sosa	–	–	–
Party of the Democratic Revolution	3: María Castelán Mondragón; Viridiana Fuentes Cruz; Omar Ortega Álvarez	–	–	–
Citizens' Movement	2: Juana Bonilla Jaime; Martín Zepeda Hernández	–	–	–
Ecologist Green Party of Mexico	2: María Mendoza Mondragón; Claudia Morales Robledo	–	–	–
New Alliance Party	2: Mónica Granillo Velazco; Rigoberto Vargas Cervantes	–	–	–
Total	50	16	6	3
Total	66.7%	21.3%	8.0%	4.0%

== Marriage statistics ==
The following table shows the number of same-sex marriages performed in the State of Mexico since 2022 as reported by the National Institute of Statistics and Geography.

Number of marriages performed in the State of Mexico
Year	Same-sex			Opposite-sex	Total	% same-sex
Year	Female	Male	Total	Opposite-sex	Total	% same-sex
2022	111	70	171	61,545	61,726	0.28%
2023	653	416	1,069	63,716	64,785	1.65%
2024	633	393	1,026	62,084	63,110	1.63%

== Public opinion ==
According to a 2018 survey by the National Institute of Statistics and Geography, 38% of the State of Mexico public opposed same-sex marriage.

== See also ==
- Same-sex marriage in Mexico
- LGBT rights in Mexico
