= CUNY TV =

American educational television station

City University of New York Television
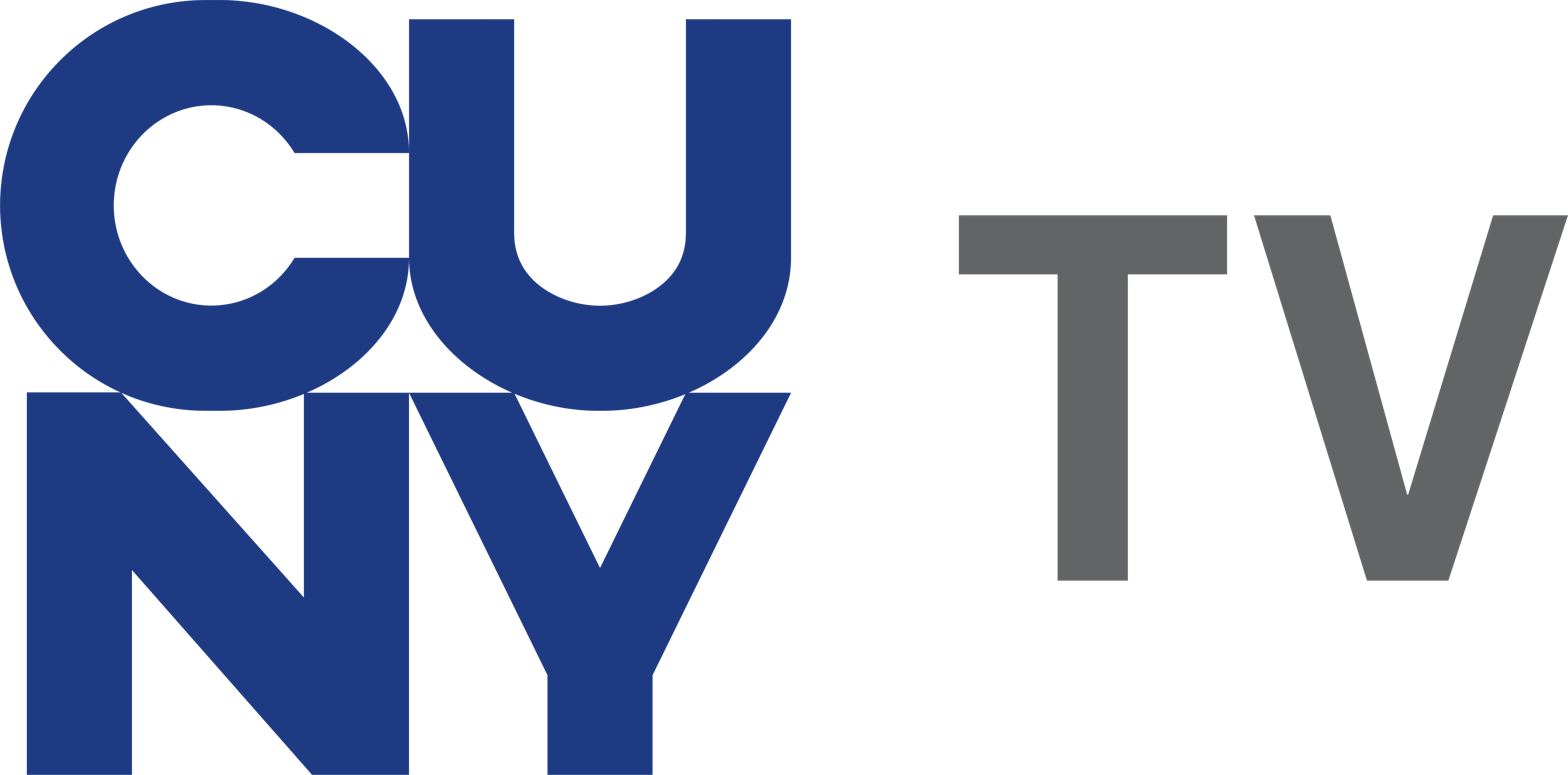

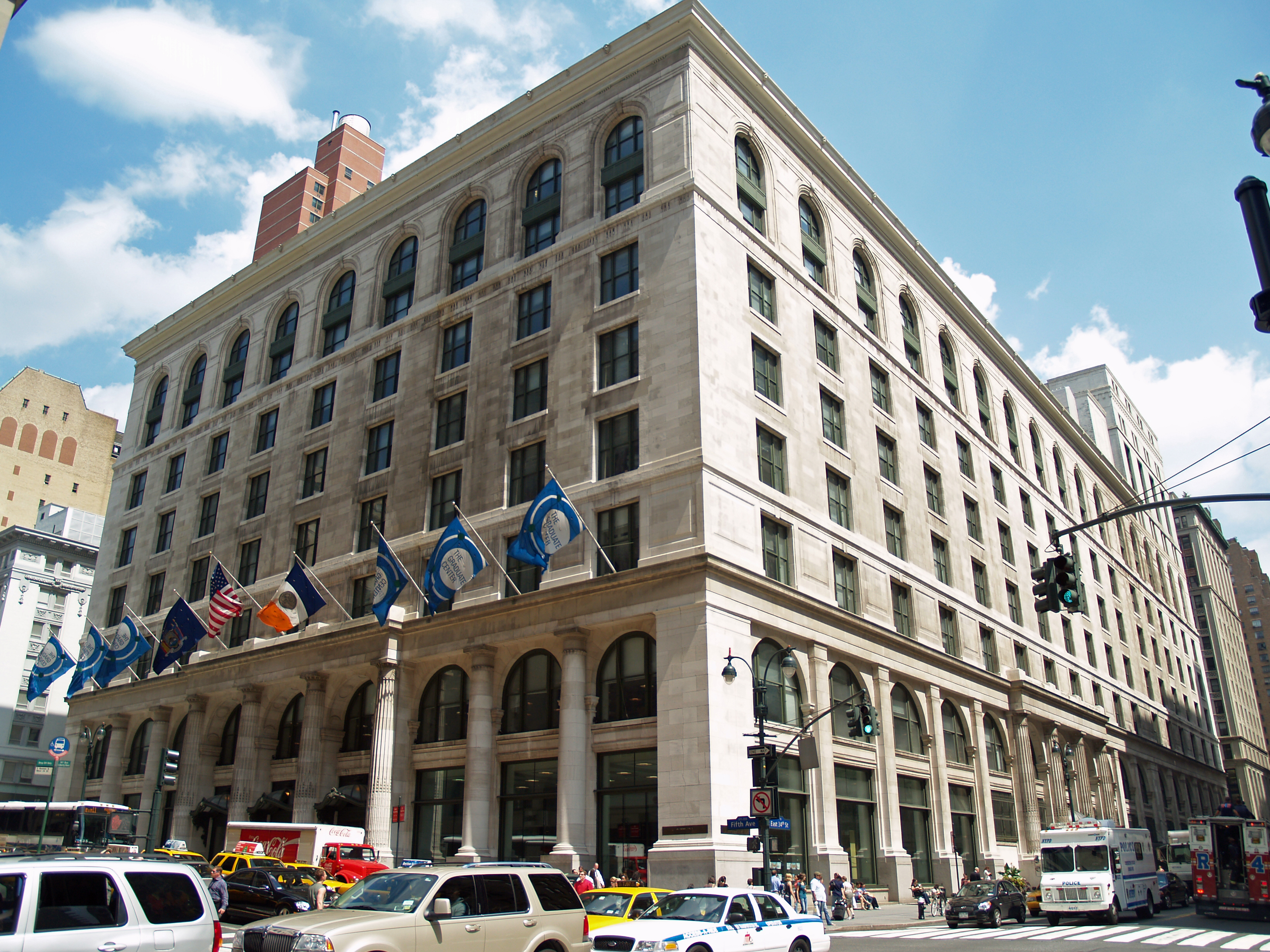
- The CUNY television studios are located at the CUNY Graduate Center, housed in the B. Altman and Company Building (pictured).
- Country: United States
- Broadcast area: New York City
- Headquarters: Graduate Center, CUNY, New York

Programming
- Picture format: SDTV ATSC / HDTV 720p

Ownership
- Owner: City University of New York

History
- Launched: 1985

Links
- Webcast: https://tv.cuny.edu/homepage/apps/
- Website: tv.cuny.edu

Availability

Terrestrial
- WNYE-TV: Channel 25.3

CUNY TV /ˈkjuːni/ is a non-commercial educational station of the City University of New York, based in New York City. Founded in 1985, the station produces and broadcasts locally focused programming with an emphasis on culture, education, and public affairs. In 2007, CUNY TV expanded into a full-capacity high-definition production and post-production facility.

== History ==
The station was first established in 1985 as CUNY TV using a channel that was set aside for CUNY by New York City a decade earlier. A 1985 report requested by Chancellor Joseph S. Murphy suggested that the channel could be used to make higher education more accessible to New Yorkers. Based on these findings a small staff with a budget of $350,000 set out to create programing that would serve the public. To this end CUNY TV introduced 25 nonfiction series from a variety of sources including some productions by branches of CUNY.

In 1986 CUNY TV was made available across all five boroughs, having formerly only been available in Manhattan, as the result of an agreement between CUNY TV and WNYE-TV.

In the late 90s CUNY TV began to broadcast The City University of New York board meetings. This was in response to a 1995 lawsuit against CUNY where students and faculty charged that the university had violated open meeting laws.

In 2009, the station transitioned to HDTV and began broadcasting on cable in SD and on WNYE-TV digital channel DTV 25.3 in 720p HD.

In 2012, television and radio studios at CUNY TV were renamed Himan Brown TV & Radio Studios after Himan Brown, an American radio producer and director.

== Original programming ==
The station airs original content, Amy Goodman's Democracy Now!, and many classic and foreign films with added commentary from Jerry Carlson and guests as part of City College's film studies program's show, City Cinematheque. Public affairs shows also include Baruch College Special. The station's shows are uploaded to its YouTube channel, and many of their arts and culture programs are also available as podcasts.

=== Current originals ===
Sources:

- A Slice of New York, studio talk show hosted by reporter Mike Gilliam;
- Arts in the City, a monthly look at the lively arts scene in the New York metropolitan area, hosted by Carol Anne Riddell;
- Asian American Life, monthly series that highlights Asian American communities nationwide, hosted by Ernabel Demillo;
- Black America, hosted by former WNBC News anchor Carol Jenkins, this show features in-depth conversations with guests, both famous and local, that explore what it means to be Black in America;
- Bob Herbert's Op-Ed.TV;
- Book It, Carol Anne Riddell hosts this monthly series featuring interviews with authors on their latest books and author and critic Linda Stasi shares book reviews;
- Café Con Felo talk show hosted by CUNY Chancellor Félix V. Matos Rodríguez;
- Center Stage, a monthly show profiling theatre creators hosted by Patrick Pacheco, formerly THEATER: All the Moving Parts;
- City Cinematheque, world film series, hosted by Professor Jerry Carlson, includes a lively discussion with scholars, film professionals, and critics;
- City Works, produced in collaboration with the CUNY School of Labor and Urban Studies, hosted by journalist Laura Flanders;
- Conversations with Jim Zirin, interview show about understanding and interpreting national and world events;
- CUNY Forum, an hour-long monthly forum to discuss in New York City government and politics;
- CUNY Uncut, a show which grew out of CUNY's first student podcast
- Italics: The Italian American Magazine, hosted by Anthony Julian Tamburri;
- LATiNAS, half-hour magazine show about Latina women nationwide, hosted by Tinabeth Piña;
- The New York Times CloseUp with Sam Roberts, a weekly show discussing the big stories with journalists covering them and with leading newsmakers;
- Nueva York, multiple New York Emmy award-winning series explores Latino culture in New York City;
- One to One, public affairs interviews by journalist Sheryl McCarthy;
- Sustainability Matters, a monthly show exploring climate change and its impact, renewable energies and sustainable practices in New York;
- Urban U, formerly "Study With The Best" a New York Emmy award-winning monthly magazine show about CUNY institution, its students, faculty, and alumni;

=== Former programming ===
- 219West, CUNY Graduate School of Journalism's monthly news magazine that covers the New York City area;
- African-American Legends, profiled prominent African-Americans, hosted by Roscoe C. Brown Jr;
- Art or Something Like It;
- Audio Maverick, a 9-part documentary podcast about one of the most visionary figures in radio, Himan Brown.
- Black Writers in America, nationally syndicated;
- Brian Lehrer TV;
- Brian Talks New York, was a weekly show hosted by the WNYC radio host Brian Lehrer;
- Canapé, series devoted to French cultural events in New York City and the United States;
- Building New York: New York Stories and The Stoler Report - New York's Business Report series about real estate and business leaders of the Metropolitan region;
- City Talk;
- CityWide, monthly talk show covers business and public affairs in New York City (Archive);
- Day at Night;
- DiverseCITY, monthly magazine show about New York City's neighborhoods and ethnic communities;
- Independent Sources, series about New York's ethnic and immigrant communities;
- Irish Writers in America, this 13 part limited series features interviews and readings with 23 icons of Irish-American literature;
- Jewish Women in America;
- Keeping Relevant, hosted by former New York City Council member Ronnie Eldridge, formerly Eldridge & Co.;
- The Laura Flanders Show, weekly series reporting on the social critics, artists, activists & entrepreneurs building tomorrow's world today, hosted by journalist Laura Flanders;
- MetroView;
- Moyers & Company;
- POTUS 2016 with Brian Lehrer;
- Pat Collins' Spotlight on Broadway, a monthly program focusing on Broadway's new productions as well as established hit shows;
- Science & U!, explores the world of science, for audiences of all ages;
- Science Goes to the Movies, series that looks at the science in contemporary motion pictures;
- Study with the Best, magazine-style show profiling success stories from The City University of New York;
- TimesTalks, was a long-running talk show co-produced with The New York Times;
- The American Theatre Wing's Working in the Theatre;
- The Open Mind, weekly nationally syndicated conversation series hosted by Alexander Heffner (initially hosted by its creator Richard D. Heffner from 1956 to 2013);
- The Urban Agenda;
- Theater Talk, was a New York Emmy award-winning nationally syndicated talk show about theater;
- Tony Guida's NY, a talk show hosted by New York City journalist Tony Guida;
- Women in Theatre;
- Women to Women;

Most of CUNY TV's original programming is archived on the station's website.
