= Proyecto Uno =

American hip-hop group

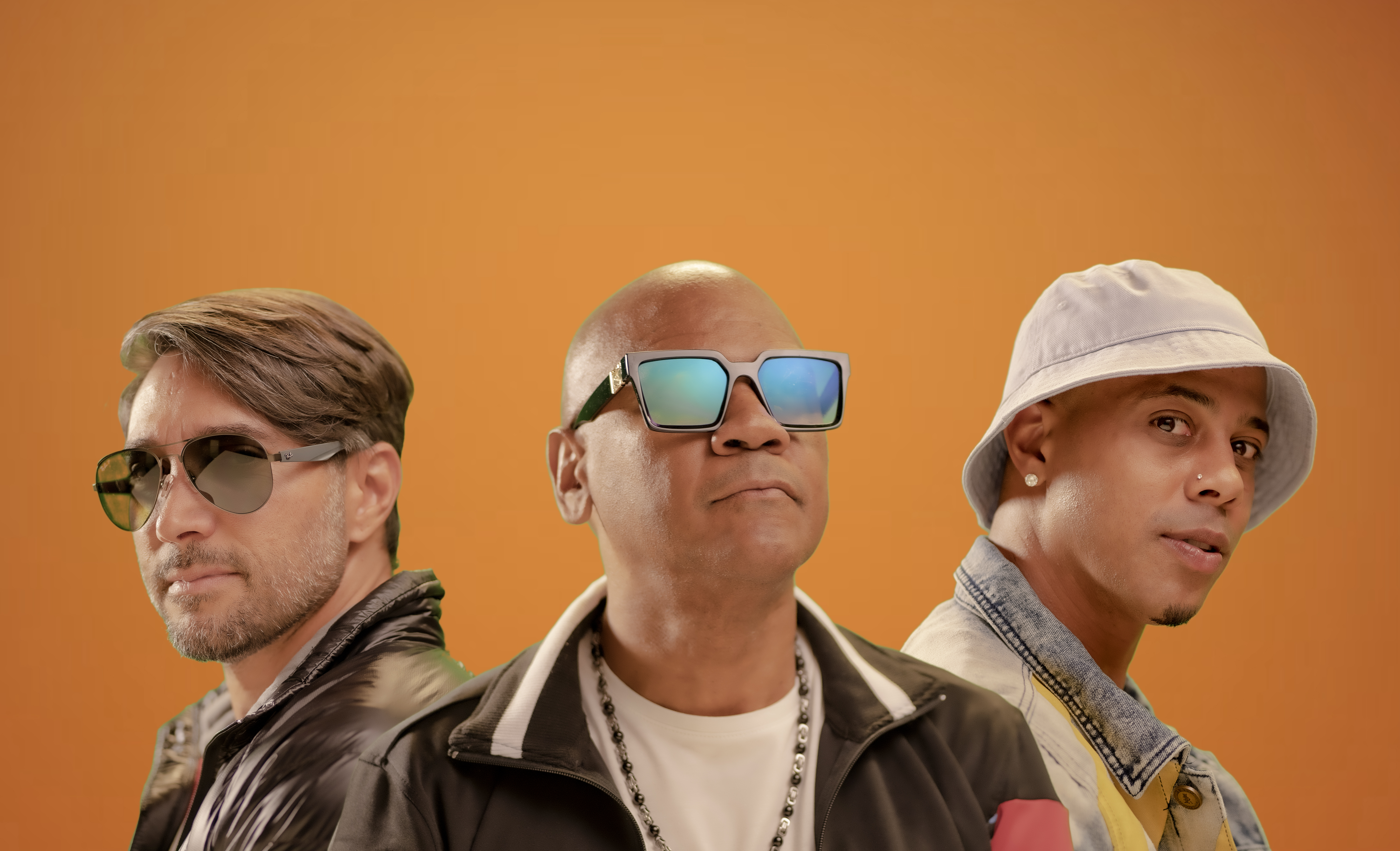

Background information
- Origin: New York City, Lower East Side
- Genres: Merengue; techno; dancehall; reggae; hip-hop
- Years active: 1989–present
- Members: Nelson Zapata; Kid G; Paolo Tondo
- Past members: Enrique (Riky) Echavarria; Magic Juan; Johnnie "El Picoso" Salgado; Erik Morales; Jose Medina (Spagga); Josue Cedeno; Anthony Galindo (Papi Joe)

Proyecto Uno (transl. Project One) is a Dominican American hip-hop and merengue house group which helped popularize a style of music that blends merengue with techno, dancehall, hip-hop, rap and reggae music. The band was founded in New York City's East Side in 1989 by Nelson Zapata and managed by Porfirio "Popi" Piña. Originally formed as traditional merengue band, Proyecto Uno received recognition in the 1990s, when the group won Billboard Latin Music Awards, Premios Lo Nuestro and was nominated for an Emmy award. The current members are Nelson Zapata, Kid G and Paolo Tondo. The manager of the group currently is Rafael Zapata III.

In July 2018, the Rolling Stone magazine listed "El Tiburón" in the position 24 of the top 50 greatest and more influential Latin songs since the 50's.

Besides touring in all Latin American countries, Proyecto Uno has also toured in Japan, Australia, Thailand, Italy, Switzerland, Germany, Netherlands and Spain among other more.

On July 24, 2024, the group received a special recognition from New York City mayor Eric Adams, in celebration of the group's 35th anniversary during their iconic show at Summerstage Central Park.

In October 2024, Proyecto Uno closed the Billboard Awards in a celebration of their 35-year career.

== Recognitions ==
- 1993 and 1995: Premios Ronda and Premios Orquídea (Venezuela)
- 1993 and 1996: New York ACE Awards
- 1994: Premios Lo Nuestro, Música Rap 1994
- 1994, 1995 and 1997: New York Premios Estrella
- 1996 and 1997: New York Premios Too Much
- 1996: Song of the Colombian World Cup Team Está Pegao
- 1997: Billboard Latin Music Awards, Rap Album Of the Year, In Da’ House 1997
- 1998: Billboard Latin Music Awards, Latin Dance Single of the Year, Mueve La Cadera (Move your Hips) with Reel 2 Reel
- 1998: Nominated: Premios Lo Nuestro, Grupo Del Año-Tropical
- 1999: Nominated to Billboard Latin Music Awards, Latin Dance Club Play Track of the Year, No Nos Tenemos (NNT)
- 1999: Emmy Awards, Outstanding Original Music Composition
- 2000: Nominated Colombian Song of the Year 25 horas
- 2003: Premios Lo Nuestro, Album of the Year, Urbana for PURA GOZADERA <Premio Lo Nuestro 2003>

== Discography ==
- 1990 Todo el Mundo!
- 1993 Está Pega'o
- 1993 In Da House
- 1995 10 Super Éxitos
- 1996 New Era
- 1996 Mega Mix Hits
- 1997 Éxitos de Proyecto Uno
- 1997 ¡Más Que Éxitos!
- 1998 The Remixes
- 1999 4
- 2002 20 Éxitos
- 2002 Todo Éxitos
- 2003 Pura Gozadera
- 2005 Éxitos de Proyecto Uno
- 2006 Evolution
- 2013 Original
- 2018 Organico
- 2022 Aniversario
- 2025 Back in Da House

== Singles ==
- "El Tiburón" (The Shark) (1993)
- "Pumpin'"
- "Materialistas"
- "Cuarto de hotel"
- "El grillero"
- "Te dejaron flat"
- "Tan interesada"
- "Todo el mundo" (Everybody)
- "Brinca" (Jump)
- "Nu nu"
- "25 horas" (25 Hours)
- "Al otro lado del mar" (In the Other Side of the Sea)
- "Hombre fiel" (Faithful Man)
- "Empujando el cielo"
- "Es tu cumpleaños" (It's Your Birthday)
- "Holla"
- "Monotonía"
- "Fiebre" (Fever)
- "Another Night"
- "Déjame probar" (Taste your Love)
- "Candela"
- "Está pega'o"
- "Déjame tener algo contigo" (Let Me Have Something with You)
- "Latinos"
- "Mueve la cadera" (Move Your Hip)
- "El Party"
- "Enamora'o" (In Love)
- "Que siga la fiesta"
- "Dale pa'l piso"
- "Beautiful Lady"
- "Ya llegó el viernes (y mi cuerpo lo sabe)"
- "Call Me" Orgánico by Proyecto Uno on Apple Music
- "Dime si me quieres" Orgánico by Proyecto Uno on Apple Music
- "Como tu no hay dos" (There is no One Like You) (https://music.apple.com/us/album/como-tu-no-hay-dos-single/1689017948)
- "Como tu no hay dos (remix) (https://music.apple.com/us/album/como-tu-no-hay-dos-single/1689017948)
- "Regresa al nido" (https://open.spotify.com/track/4wmUZzMEpuyDhkKS3oE86F?si=d895a8e30bff4cb1)
- "Danny Marin, Jessi Uribe, Proyecto uno - Alguien Me Gusta (Versión Merengue)" (https://www.youtube.com/watch?v=7d26DPtH080)
