= Gabe Pressman =

American television journalist (1924–2017)

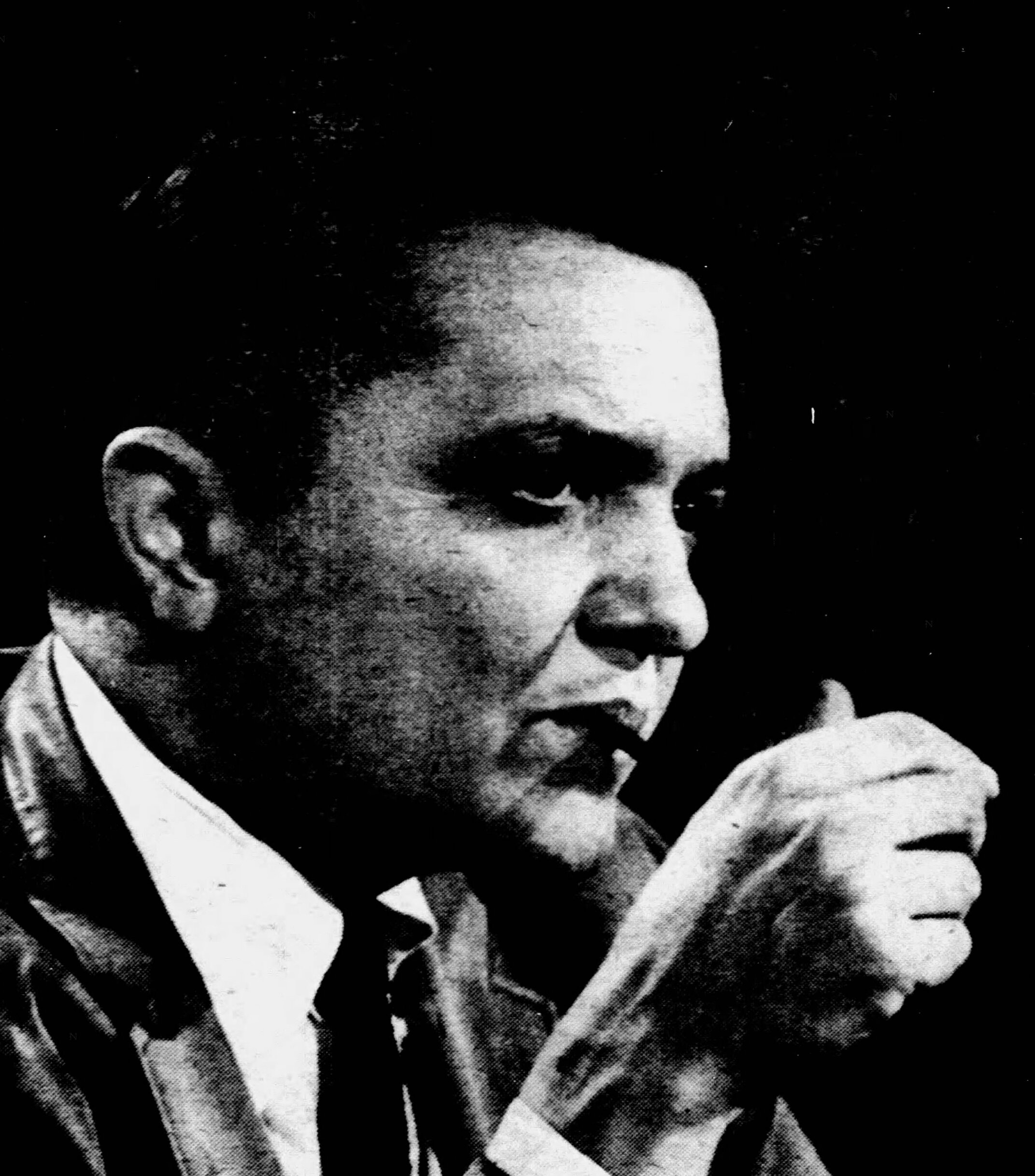
- Pressman in 1966
- Born: Gabriel Stanley Pressman; February 14, 1924; Bronx, New York, U.S.
- Died: June 23, 2017 (aged 93); Manhattan, New York, U.S.
- Education: New York University (BA, 1946); Columbia University Graduate School of Journalism (MS, 1947)
- Occupations: Journalist, TV presenter and reporter
- Military career
- Allegiance: United States
- Branch: United States Navy
- Service years: 1943–1946
- Conflicts: World War II

Gabriel Stanley Pressman (February 14, 1924 – June 23, 2017) was an American journalist who was a reporter for WNBC-TV in New York City for more than 60 years. His career spanned more than seven decades; the events he covered included the sinking of the Andrea Doria in 1956, the assassinations of JFK and Martin Luther King Jr., the Beatles' first trip to the United States, and the attacks on the World Trade Center on 9/11. He was one of the pioneers of United States television news and has been credited as the first reporter to have left the studio for on-the-scene "street reporting" at major events. Pressman was dubbed the "Dean of New York Journalism"; his numerous awards include a Peabody and 11 Emmys, and he was considered a New York icon.

== Early life and education ==
Pressman was born and raised in the Bronx, the son of Jewish immigrants, Benjamin Pressman (1893–1970), who was born in Austria, and Lena Rifkin Pressman, born in Russia. His father, a dentist, became a professional magician later in life; he got his start in magic by performing tricks to entertain children when he would go to schools to teach them about proper dental care. Gabe had a younger brother, Paul (1929–2003), who was a psychiatrist.

Pressman graduated from Morris High School. He got his start in journalism early; as a young boy of 8 or 9, he made a newspaper for his family, with cheeky headlines such as "Grandma's Spongecake Made With Real Sponges". Later he worked as a cub reporter for the Peekskill Evening Star in Peekskill during the summers.

He attended New York University, majoring in History and Government, but his education was interrupted during World War II. At 19, he enlisted in the U.S. Navy and served from 1943 to 1946. He took part in the Philippines Campaign while serving as a communications officer aboard the submarine chaser USS PC-470 in the South Pacific.

After the war, Pressman resumed his education, graduating from NYU with a bachelor's degree in 1946, and from the Columbia University Graduate School of Journalism the following year.

== Career ==
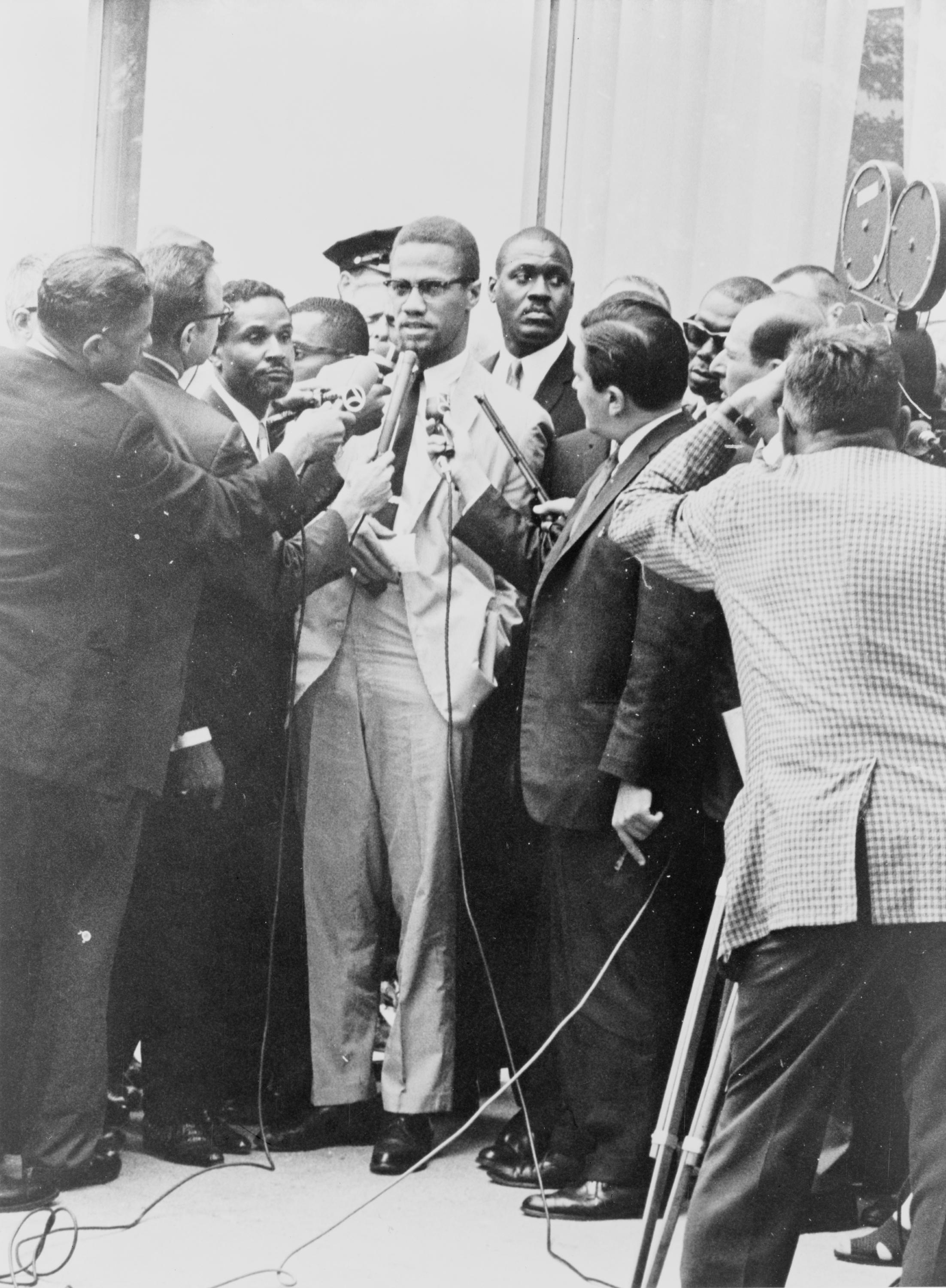
Pressman, center right, side to the camera, in front of Malcolm X at a 1964 press conference

After earning his master's degree from Columbia in 1947, Pressman worked for a short period as a journalist for the Newark Evening News. Columbia then awarded him a Pulitzer Traveling Fellowship, and he spent the next 15 months in Europe as a freelance journalist, contributing feature stories for various outlets, including the Overseas News Agency (a subsidiary of the Jewish Telegraphic Agency). In 1948, he was briefly arrested in Berlin while in the Soviet sector of the city, in what was reported to be a sign of increasing hostilities from the Soviet government toward the west. He was headed to the Polish Consulate Berlin when he was detained, but was released two hours later.

Among the events he covered in Europe was the 1949 show trial of Cardinal József Mindszenty, who opposed the communist regime of the new Hungarian People's Republic, which Pressman covered for The New York Times and for Edward R. Murrow's radio program.

Pressman worked for various New York City newspapers after his return from Europe before becoming a reporter in 1954 for what then was NBC's radio station WNBC, and moved over to television in 1956. Pressman spent the bulk of his broadcast career with NBC. The exception was a seven-year period from 1972 through 1979 when he reported for what was then the Metromedia station, WNEW-TV, Channel 5 (now WNYW). Since 1945, Pressman covered the lives of 10 New York City mayors, 10 New York State governors, 15 senators from New York, and 13 United States presidents.

Pressman, who described himself as "just a little Jewish guy from the Bronx", became a fixture of New York City. Journalist Robert D. McFadden wrote of Pressman, "A profound, matinee-idol anchorman he was not. But to generations of mayors, governors and ordinary New Yorkers, he was Gabe: the short, rumpled, pushy guy from Channel 4 who seemed always on the scene, elbowing his way to the front and jabbing his microphone in the face of a witness or a big shot."

Pressman pioneered street reporting as the first television journalist to do live and on-scene coverage of events. After President Kennedy was shot on November 22, 1963, Pressman went out on the street to interview New Yorkers for their reactions; he was live among a crowd of people listening to NBC Radio when the news came that Kennedy had died. Later that evening he reported from darkened Times Square and interviewed a New York City patrolman about the somber mood in the area.

Pressman was co-anchor (with Bill Ryan) of New York's first early-evening half-hour newscast, the Pressman-Ryan Report, born out of a devastating 1963 New York City-area newspaper strike. He covered the New York region for NBC News, WNBC-TV and WNBC-AM radio. He was sent by the network to report on many historic events, including the 1956 sinking of the Andrea Doria, Elvis Presley's Army stint which went through Brooklyn, one-on-one interviews with Marilyn Monroe, Harry S. Truman and Fidel Castro, the 1964 arrival of the Beatles at Kennedy Airport, the assassination of Malcolm X, chasing after newly inaugurated New York mayor John Lindsay in the streets during the 1966 transit strike, the 1968 Democratic National Convention in Chicago, where he reported on the clashes between demonstrators and police, and the aftermath of the assassinations of John F. Kennedy, Robert F. Kennedy and Martin Luther King Jr. Pressman was a reporter for NBC News at the Woodstock festival in upstate New York in 1969.

Pressman has been credited with helping create the New York City institution known as the "perp walk," which was born in the 1970s when he clashed with famed District Attorney Robert Morgenthau over access to filming notable suspects after they had been arrested. Morgenthau recalled, "Gabe said, 'We need pictures to report your cases,' and I said, 'You're breaking my heart.'"

His reputation as an intrepid reporter is the subject of a gentle lampoon on a recording of Bob and Ray ("The Two and Only," Columbia Records, c. 1970). A reporter billed as "Gabe Pressman" was played by actor J.D. Cullum in Billy Crystal's HBO film 61*, reporting unfavorably on the baseball exploits of Roger Maris (played by Barry Pepper).

He was a past president of the New York Press Club, from 1997 to 2000, and as head of that organization fought for the rights of New York's journalists, both print and electronic.

Up until the time of his death in June 2017, Pressman still worked part-time at WNBC, mostly as a blog writer about New York City news on the station's website, and he was active on Twitter. In 2014, he stated that it was an arthritic knee that kept him from chasing stories like he used to. A few months before his death, he covered the 255th annual Saint Patrick's Day Parade in New York, which reportedly was the last time Pressman was on-air.

== Personal life ==
Pressman was married to Emma Mae Kracht from 1953 until their divorce in 1967. They had a son and two daughters. In 1972, he married Vera Elisabeth Olsen, a psychotherapist, with whom he had another son.

Pressman died at Mount Sinai Hospital Manhattan on June 23, 2017, aged 93.

== Awards ==
Pressman amassed many awards for his work, including multiple Emmys and a Peabody Award. He won many of those awards for his coverage of the plight of New York City's homeless population.

- 11 Emmy Awards
- 1958: George Polk Award for Television Reporting
- 1981: Lincoln University's Unity award for "Blacks and the Mayor: How Far Apart?"
- 1982: New York Press Club's Feature Award for "The Homeless"
- 1982: New York State Associated Press Broadcasters Association Award for Excellence in Individual Reporting
- 1982: UPI New York State Broadcasters' Award for Best Feature News Story for "The Homeless"
- 1983: New York Chapter of Professional Journalists, Sigma Delta Chi's Deadline Club Award for "The Hungry"
- 1983: Peabody Award for Asylum In The Streets
- 1983: Deadline Club Award
- 1985: Olive Award for Excellence in Broadcasting
- 1986: New York chapter of NATAS Governors' Award
- 1989: Edward R. Murrow Award
- 2015: Fair Media Council's Folio Lifetime Achievement Award
- 2017: City Limits Urban Journalism Award (posthumous)
