= Verónica Juárez Piña =

Mexican politician (born 1971)

- Born: 28 September 1971 (age 54); Tlaquepaque, Jalisco, Mexico
- Occupation: Politician
- Political party: PRD

Verónica Beatriz Juárez Piña (Note: In this Mexican name, the surname is Juárez and the second or maternal family name is Piña.) (born 28 September 1971) is a Mexican politician affiliated with the Party of the Democratic Revolution (PRD).

A native of Tlaquepaque, Jalisco, from 2012 to 2015 she served as a plurinominal deputy in the 62nd Congress representing the first electoral region, which includes her home state. She returned to the Chamber of Deputies in 2018 to represent the same electoral region during the 64nd Congress.

Juárez Piña sought election as one of Mexico City's senators in the 2024 Senate election, occupying the second place on the Fuerza y Corazón por México coalition's two-name formula. The coalition placed second behind the Sigamos Haciendo Historia alliance; accordingly, Juárez's running mate, Cynthia López Castro, was elected, but Juárez herself was not.
