= Porfirio Piña =

Porfirio Pina
- Also known as: Porfirio Piña, Popi
- Born: August 16, 1965 (age 60); Dominican Republic
- Genres: Pop, Latin American music, Tropical music, Rock en Español
- Occupations: Director of marketing, talent manager, A&R, executive producer
- Years active: 1989– present
- Labels: Broadcast Music Incorporated, Palm Pictures

Porfirio Piña (born August 16, 1965), talent manager, entrepreneur, music advocate and artistic director. He is a native of the Dominican Republic, currently based out of New York City, and Miami.

== Career ==
Porfirio currently serves as the senior director of the Latin division for BMI, Broadcast Music Inc. Founded in 1939, BMI is an American performing rights organization that represents more than 350,000 songwriters, composers and music publishers in all genres of music. Porfirio is also a partner at Ritmo Loco Publishing, Inc., advising artists and managing catalog of more than one hundred songs, arranging co-publishing deals for Latin America, Europe and Asia, as well as issuing licenses to record labels, TV networks and film companies. In 2005, Mr. Pina signed Ritmo Loco Publishing to an administrative deal with publishing giant Sony/ATV.

Before joining BMI, Mr. Piña managed Nicolas Tovar who has written numerous hits for Cristian Castro, Paulina Rubio, Ricky Martin, La India, and Jaci Velasquez among others.

Mr. Pina began his music business career back in 1989, forming and managing the first-ever Merengue Hip-Hop group Proyecto Uno. Under Porfirio's management the group went on to receive numerous Gold and Platinum Records Awards in the USA, Mexico, Central America, Venezuela, Colombia, Chile, Argentina and Spain, Billboard Awards, Premio Lo Nuestro Awards, Orquidea de Oro (Venezuela), ACE Awards (New York), El Casandra Awards (Dominican Republic) and Latin Grammy Nominations.

In 1995, together with a former partner Porfirio created Double P Music, a management and production company, that played a key role in forming, launching and managing various artists such as El Chipo (Rodven/PolyGram); Sandy & Papo MC (Platano Records/Universal); Joselito (Musart/Balboa) and Ilegales (BMG US Latin). Together they created and produced remixes for Juan Luis Guerra, Enrique Iglesias, Los Hermanos Rosario, Roy Tavare, Amparo Sandino, Checo Acosta and others successful international artists.

Between January 2001 and May 2002, Porfirio joined Palm Pictures/Ryko and later Latino Music Corp where he was the Marketing Director, developing strategic sales, marketing and promotion plans for Carlos Manuel y Su Clan (Palm/Ryko), Fernando Villalona (LARAS & NARAS GRAMMY Nominee), Felix D'Oleo (LARAS GRAMMY Nominee), Angelito Villalona, Ramón Orlando and Swing Divino amongst others.

== Speaking engagements ==
- NALIP: Synch Licensing 101 (April 2010)
- FUNGLODE: Placing Your Music in TV/Film & Synch Licenses (November 2009)
- Berklee College of Music: The Business of Music (November 2009)
- Latin Alternative Music Conference: Radio Relevance-The Role of AM/FM Stations in the Digital Age (July 2009)
- Monroe College: Entrepreneurship & Marketing Class (May 2009)
- Brooklyn College: How Multicultural Marketing Influences Your World (April 2009)
- Brooklyn College: How Multicultural Marketing Influences Your World (October 2008)
- Boston Music Conference: Copyright and Performing Rights 101 (September 2008)
- Billboard Latin Conferences: BMI & Berklee College of Music: Music Business 101 Roundtable (April 2008)
- Berklee College of Music: The Business of Songwriting (November 2007)
- Celia Cruz High School of Music: Latin Grammy en las Escuelas (October 2007)
- Billboard Latin Conferences: How I Wrote That Song (April 2007)
- Moderator of BMI Presents: Industry Insider Series (2005-2006-2007-2008-2009)
- University of Miami – School of Music: Grammy Career Seminar (February 2007)
- El Museo del Barrio: Merengue Popular Music and the Industry (November 2006)
- NALIP: Roundtable Film Producers and the Music Business (September 2006)
- Latin Alternative Music Conference: The Future of the Latin Music Industry (August 2005)
- Mandelbaum Music Project: Music Business Careers (May 2005)
- Billboard Latin Conferences: The Latin Music Industry Future (April 2005)

== Professional associations ==
Mr. Pina is a voting member in both NARAS (Grammy) and LARAS (Latin Grammy), as well as for The National Academy of Popular Music. He is a member of The NYC Latin Media and Entertainment Commission, Association of Independent Music Publisher, Dominican American National Roundtable. He is the board director for the Latin Scholarships division of The BMI Foundation, Board Co-Chairman for The National Association of Latinos Independent Producers and is a Co-Chairman in the Latin Committee of NARAS – NY Chapter.

== Recognitions ==
El Diario La Prensa: EL Awards 2008, Successful Latinos in the USA (November 2008), The Recording Academy: Supporting Education, Advocacy and Human Service Initiatives (February 2008), DTM Magazine: Latino Trendsetter Awards (2006).

== See also ==
- List of people from the Dominican Republic
