= Tinabeth Piña =

American film producer

Tinabeth Piña is an American multi-media journalist. She is currently the host of 'LATiNAS' and 'Globe Scholars'.

== Early life ==
Piña grew up in Easton, Pennsylvania and attended Notre Dame High School, where she was the school's first female PIAA track and field state champion in the 200 meter dash. She went on to graduate with honors from Lafayette College.

== Professional career ==
Piña's first broadcast television job was as a reporter and host on MSG Metro Channels.

She then went on to produce Biography for A&E, hosted Daily Remix on Oxygen, the Us Magazine report on local ABC news channels nationwide and eventually became an entertainment/lifestyle/features reporter for WABC New York. She was also a recurring guest journalist on The Maury Povich Show.

Since 2012, Piña has been employed by CUNY TV, where she is the station's managing editor and host of 'LATiNAS' - a half-hour magazine show dedicated to profiling LatinX women in the United States.

In 2018 Piña created 'Globe Scholars' - a TELLY award winning travel show about study abroad airing on PBS stations since 2019.

She won an Emmy Award as part of the production team for VIVA - a series profiling successful Hispanics .
