= New York Press Club =

Organization in New York City

The New York Press Club, sometimes NYPC, is a nonprofit membership organization that promotes journalism in the New York City metropolitan area. It is unaffiliated with any government organization and abstains from politics. While the club is headquarters in New York City, it serves as an association for journalists based in the United States.

== History ==
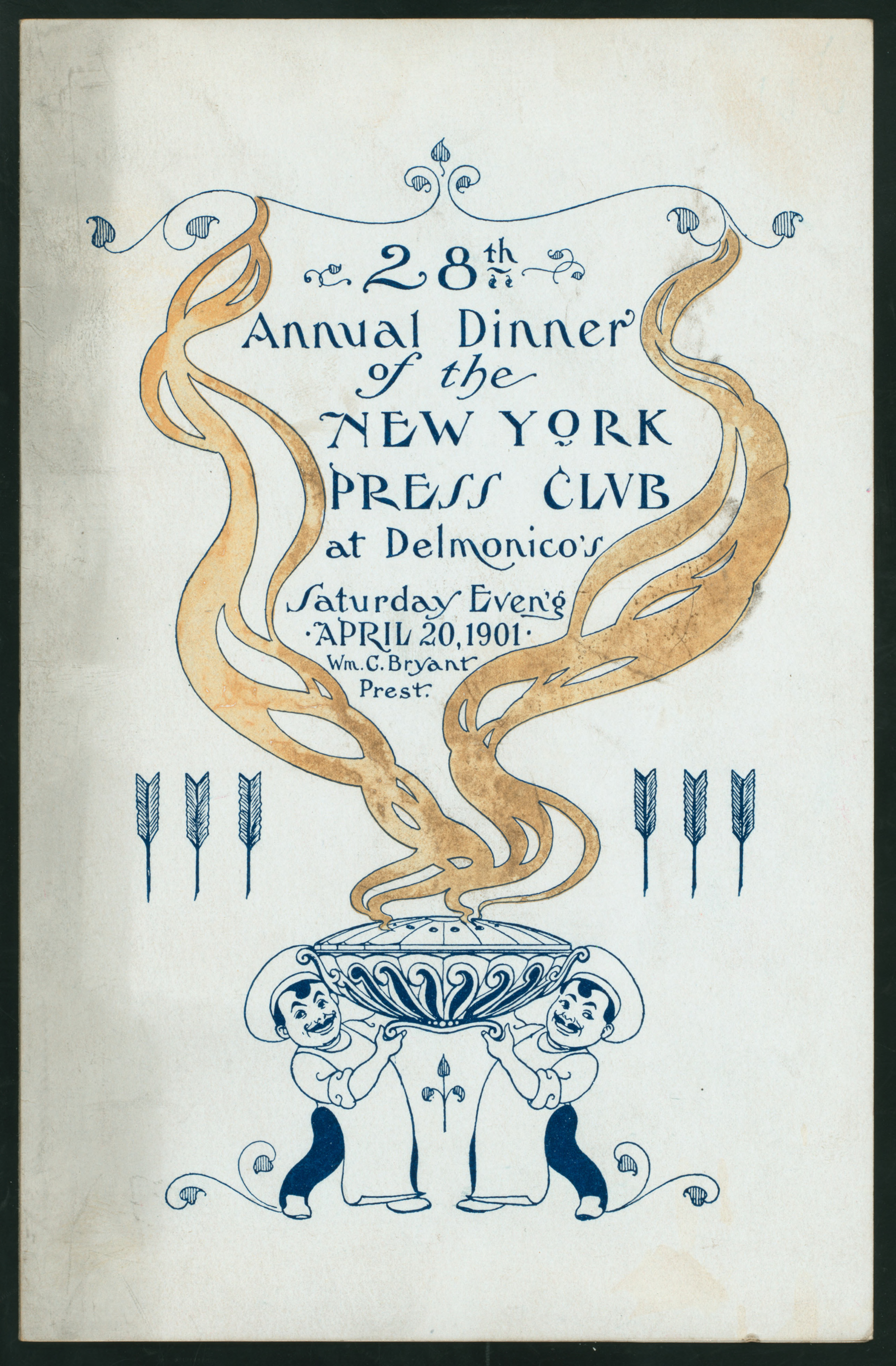
The club has a tradition of having annual dinners. Photo: image of a dinner invitation from 1901.

The organization in differing forms has been around since the nineteenth century. In 1887, its members erected a 38-foot obelisk to mark the gravesite of a deceased reporter. But during the Great Depression in the United States, the organization fell apart. A revitalized organization was founded in 1948 as the New York Newspaper Reporters Association, and its name was changed to its current one in 1972.

== Activities ==
In conjunction with its foundation, New York Press Club Foundation, the club focuses on furthering the interests of journalists and media people. It sponsors lectures and presentations relevant to journalism such as press freedom, investigative reporting, the relationship between the media and the government, the role of community newspapers, changes in media, topics in the news, foreign press coverage of New York, and questions about how the press covers itself. For example, it spurred discussion on the subject of concussions in American football. It sponsors debates among candidates for public office, provides support for journalists faced with media-related legal issues, and works with government agencies on issues such as issuing press credentials. For example, when New York mayor Bill De Blasio called for a closed-down session to exclude reporters, the Press Club's president Larry Seary criticized the decision, arguing for greater transparency. It sponsors an annual Conference on Journalism which is held at New York University, and it used to publish Byline Magazine which features topics of interest to journalists. When prominent newspeople die, the organization issues statements about their contributions; for example, when news reporter Gabe Pressman died in 2017, the club issued a statement that Pressman "fought ferociously for journalists' rights".

The organization promotes the freedom of the press. It has criticized decisions to shut down news sites. When U.S. Attorney Jeff Sessions vowed to review "media subpoenas" as an attempt to quell leaks in government, the club criticized the remarks as "a not-so-veiled shot across the bow at the news media" and suggested that journalists must not be intimidated by such threats. When CNN journalist Jim Acosta was singled out by then president-elect Donald Trump during a press conference, in which the reporter's questions went unanswered, the club wrote a letter to Trump in Acosta's defense.

The current president is David Cruz of Newsday, who took office in 2024. The foundation also offers scholarships to local journalism students.

== Award programs ==
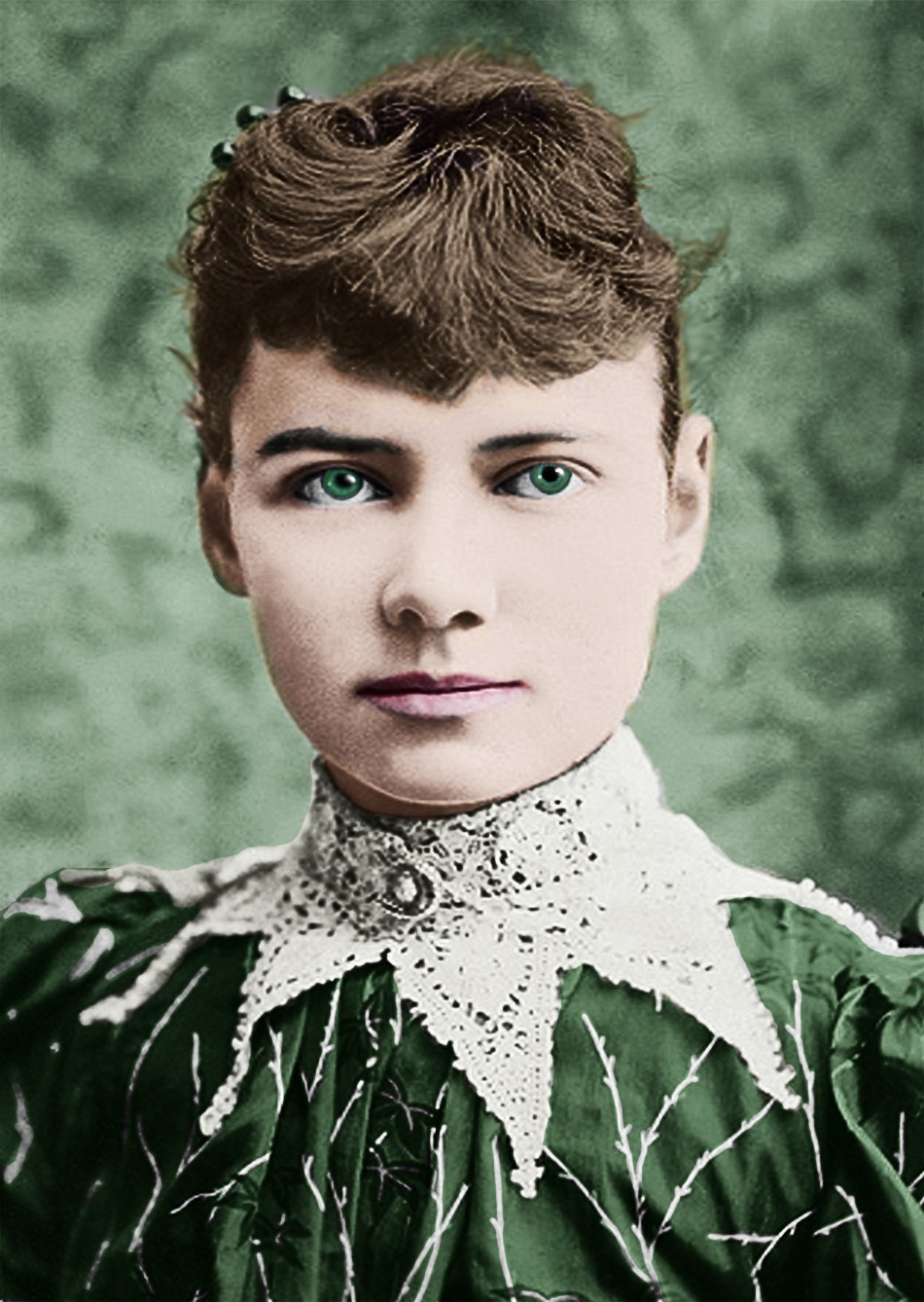
Nellie Bly (1864–1922) was a crusading reporter who stretched the boundaries of investigative journalism; the club names an award after her.

Awards are given in categories such as writing, editing, and video production. Its awards are often cited by publishers and newspapers and reporters. They include:

- Gold Keyboard Award for excellence in investigative journalism. This award has been described as the association's most prestigious award. Typically the organization gives out the awards at an annual dinner in June.
- The Reverend Mychal Judge Heart of New York Award for reporting about New York City.
- The Nellie Bly Cub Reporter Award, given to reporters with less than three years of experience. This award has been given annually since 1978; past recipients include investigative journalists such as Mina Kimes and Jonathan Kanterman. The award was named after crusading journalist Nellie Bly, who was employed by Joseph Pulitzer in the 1890s who, according to one account, went to great lengths to get material for her stories; for example, she got herself committed to an insane asylum for ten days in order to report on what happened within the institution. H. Claire Brown is another recipient of the Nellie Bly award.
- The New York Journalism Hall of Fame Award for journalists whose careers in New York media characterized by long tenure, integrity and achievement.
- The New York Press Club President's Award in recognition of careers which have had a salutary impact on journalism.

== Past presidents ==
In Office	President	Employer
1948	William J. Keegan	New York Post
1949	Anthony Marino	New York Daily News
1950	Alfred E Clark	New York Times
1951	Joseph Endler	New York Herald Tribune
1952	Rodney "Budd" Stahl	New York Mirror
1953	Frank Engle	Fairchild Publications
1954	Syd Livingston	New York Journal American
1955	Raymond Doyle	American Weekly
1956	James Ritchie	Associated Press
1957	Arthur Rosenfeld	New York Post
1958	James C O'Connor	New York Mirror
1959	Thomas D Zumbo	UPI
1960	Edward Kirkman	New York Daily News
1961	James Antone	Fairchild Publications
1962	Harry Singer	New York Mirror
1963	Robert Mindlin	Long Island Press
1964	Charles Grutzner	New York Times
1965	Harold Phelan	World-Telegram and Sun
1966	George Douris	Long Island Star-Journal
1967	Gus Engelman	WABC-AM
1968–69	Thomas Poster	New York Daily News
1970	John San Antonio	Long Island Press
1971–72	John Shanahan	Associated Press
1973	Pati Davis	UPI
1973–74	John Mulligan	Associated Press
1975–76	Patrick Muldowney	WABC-TV
1977	Joe Bragg	WHN
1978–79	Vincent Lee	New York Daily News
1980–81	Mark Lieberman	New York Daily News
1982–83	Len Buder	New York Times
1984	Jerry Schmetterer	CNN
1985–86	Marcia Kramer	New York Daily News
1987	Mitch Lebe	WYNY
1988	Larry Sutton	New York Daily News
1989–90	Larry Celona	New York Daily News
1991–92	Harry Ryttenberg	WNBC
1993–94	Phil O'Brien	NY 1 News
1995–96	Deborah Wetzel	WCBS-FM
1997–2000	Gabe Pressman	WNBC
2001–2003	Carol Anne Riddell	WNBC
2003–2005	Rich Lamb	WCBS Newsradio
2006–2008	Stephannia Cleaton	Staten Island Advance
2009–2012	Glenn Schuck	Metro Networks
2012–2015	Larry Seary	WNBC
2015–2018	Steve Scott	WCBS Newsradio
2018–2021	Jane Tillman Irving	WCBS Newsradio
2021–2024	Debra Toppeta	womanaroundtown.com
2024–present	David Cruz	Newsday
