= Carol Anne Riddell =

American journalist

Carol Anne Riddell is an American reporter and journalist specialising in news on children and education. She was the education reporter and co-anchor of the News 4 New York newscast on Sundays for WNBC-TV in New York City until 2009.

== Life ==
Riddell completed a bachelor's degree at Tufts University, and received a master's degree in journalism from the Medill School of Journalism at Northwestern University. Riddell's stories have frequently focused on issues in education, including overcrowding in the New York City School System, poor conditions in several city schools and the treatment of disabled students. Her series on schools' disposal of uneaten food prompted the Board of Education to meet with groups that distribute food to the needy and devise a food donation system.

In 2000, Riddell was elected president of the New York Press Club, after serving on the club's Board of Directors. In 2006, she became president of Inner Circle, an organization of journalists which fundraises for charities.

=== Recognition ===
Riddell has received three New York State Broadcasters Association awards, for Outstanding Individual Program/Series Designed for Children (2002), Outstanding Hard News Story (2001) and Outstanding Public Affairs Programming (2000).

Riddell was part of the News 4 New York team which received an Emmy Award for the 2003-04 series, “What Matters”. She has received an award for New York Cub Reporter of the Year and a Feature Award honor from the New York Press Club and a National Award for Education Reporting by The Education Writers Association for her story, “Lost Bounty;” Along with Gabe Pressman and Melissa Russo she was recognised by the Citizens' Committee for Children for their coverage of contemporary issues affecting children. Riddell was also the inaugural recipient of the Hunter College School of Education Media Appreciation Award for her work highlighting the challenges of urban education.
