= Adrián Juárez Jiménez =

Mexican politician (born 1978)

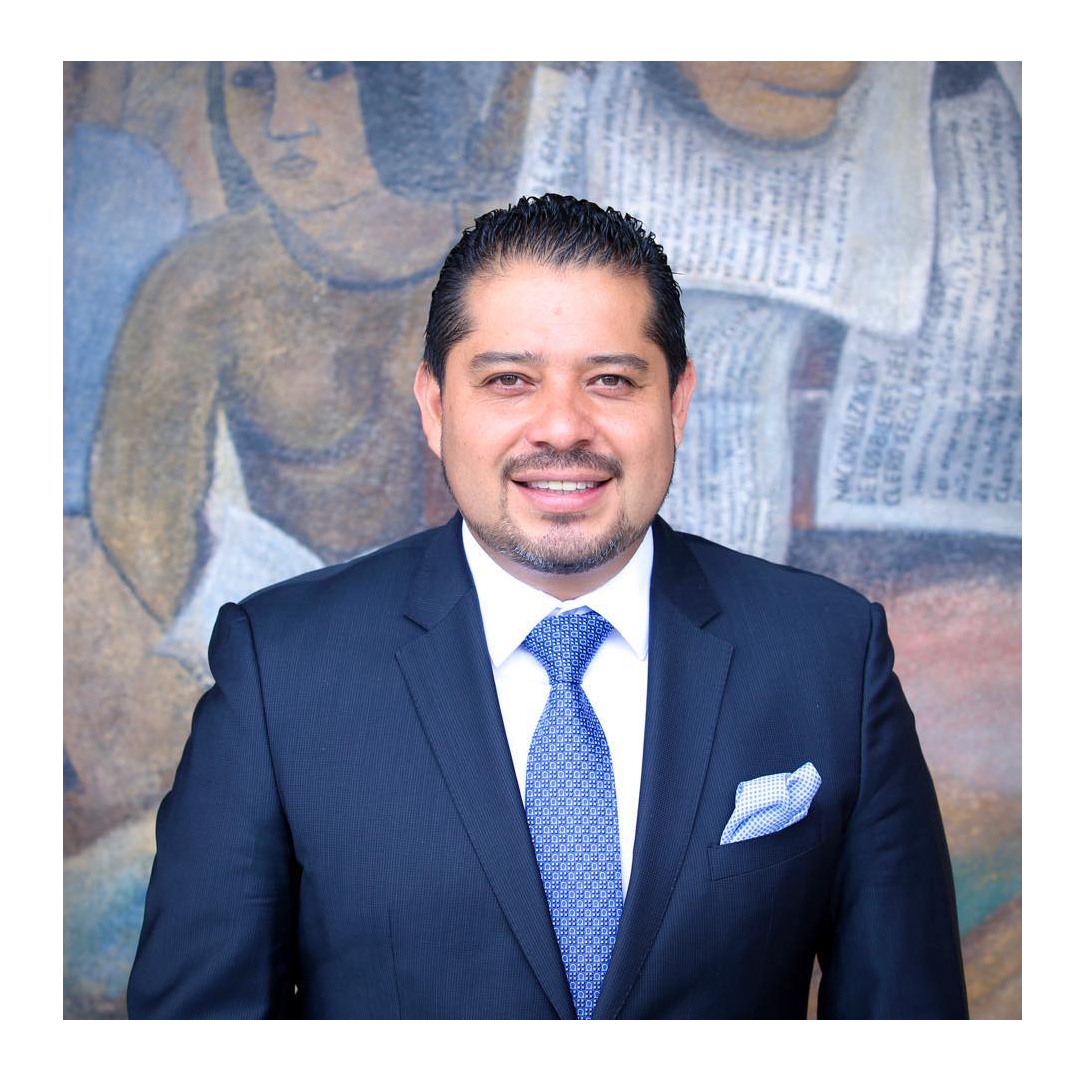
- Born: 6 February 1978 (age 48); State of Mexico, Mexico
- Occupation: Politician
- Political party: PAN

Alonso Adrián Juárez Jiménez (born 6 February 1978) is a Mexican politician affiliated with the National Action Party. As of 2014 he served as Deputy of the LIX Legislature of the Mexican Congress representing the State of Mexico as replacement of Rubén Mendoza Ayala.
