= MS MR discography =

This is the discography for American rock band MS MR.

== Albums ==
=== Studio albums ===
Title	Album details	Peak chart positions									
Title	Album details	US	US Alt.	US Rock	AUS	BEL (FL)	BEL (WA)	CAN	GER	SWI	UK
Secondhand Rapture	Released: May 10, 2013; Label: Columbia Records; Formats: CD, LP, digital download	116	24	35	22	126	—	—	36	51	65
How Does It Feel	Released: July 17, 2015; Label: Columbia Records; Formats: CD, LP, digital download	141	12	16	12	129	131	23	61	51	122
"—" denotes a recording that did not chart.

=== Extended plays ===
Title	Album details	Peak chart positions
Title	Album details	US Heat.
Ghost City USA	Released: June 27, 2011; Label: self-released; Formats: digital download	—
Candy Bar Creep Show	Released: September 14, 2012; Label: IAMSOUND Records; Formats: CD, vinyl, digital download	7
Fantasy	Released: November 7, 2013; Label: Chess Club/Columbia; Formats: vinyl, digital download	—
Secondhand ^2: The Remix EP	Released: April 8, 2014; Label: Columbia; Formats: digital download	—

== Singles ==
Song	Year	Peak chart positions							Album
Song	Year	US Alt.	US Rock	AUS	BEL (FL) Tip	CAN Rock	GER	UK	Album
"Hurricane"	2012	8	29	—	31	36	38	—	Candy Bar Creep Show and Secondhand Rapture (Note: "Hurricane" was re-released internationally in April 2013.)
"Fantasy"	2013	—	—	77	48	—	—	—	Secondhand Rapture
"Think of You"	2013	37	— (Note: "Think of You" did not enter the Rock Songs chart, but peaked at number 49 on the US Rock Airplay chart.)	—	—	—	—	190	Secondhand Rapture
"Painted"	2015	38	—	— (Note: "Painted" did not enter the Australian ARIA Singles Chart but peaked at number five on the ARIA Hitseekers Chart.)	—	—	—	—	How Does It Feel
"Criminals"	2015	—	—	—	—	—	—	—	How Does It Feel
"Saturn Return"	2023	—	—	—	—	—	—	—	Non-album single
"—" denotes a single that did not chart or was not released in that territory.

=== Promotional singles ===
Song	Year	Peak chart positions		Album
Song	Year	US Rock	UK	Album
"Dark Doo Wop"	2012	—	—	Candy Bar Creep Show and Secondhand Rapture
"Bones"	2012	35	158	Candy Bar Creep Show and Secondhand Rapture
"Wrong Victory"	2015	—	—	How Does It Feel
"How Does It Feel"	2015	—	—	How Does It Feel
"—" denotes single that did not chart or were not released.

== Music videos ==
Title	Year	Director(s)
"Ash Tree Lane (Demo)"	2011	
"Hurricane"	2012	
"Bones" (Lyric video)	2012	
"Dark Doo Wop"	2012	
"Ash Tree Lane"	2012	
"Fantasy"	2013	Austin Peters
"Hurricane"	2013	Luke Gilford
"Think of You"	2013	Brthr
"Painted"	2015	Tabitha Denholm
"Wrong Victory (Acoustic)"	2015	Gustavo Torres
"Criminals"	2015	Charlotte Rutherford
"Reckless" (live at the Fox Oakland Theatre)	2016	Mafalda Millies
"Wrong Victory"	2016	Mafalda Millies

== Remixes ==
Title	Year	Original artist
"Pilgrim" (MS MR Remix)	2013	MØ
"You (Ha Ha Ha)" (MS MR Remix)	2013	Charli XCX
"Dragon" (MS MR Remix)	2013	Fallulah
"Only Love Can Hurt Like This" (MS MR Remix)	2014	Paloma Faith
"Coffee" (MS MR Remix)	2014	Sylvan Esso
"Hearts Like Ours" (MS MR Remix)	2014	The Naked and Famous
"Head Up High" (MS MR Remix)	2015	Oh Land
