= Erik Arvinder =

Swedish violinist

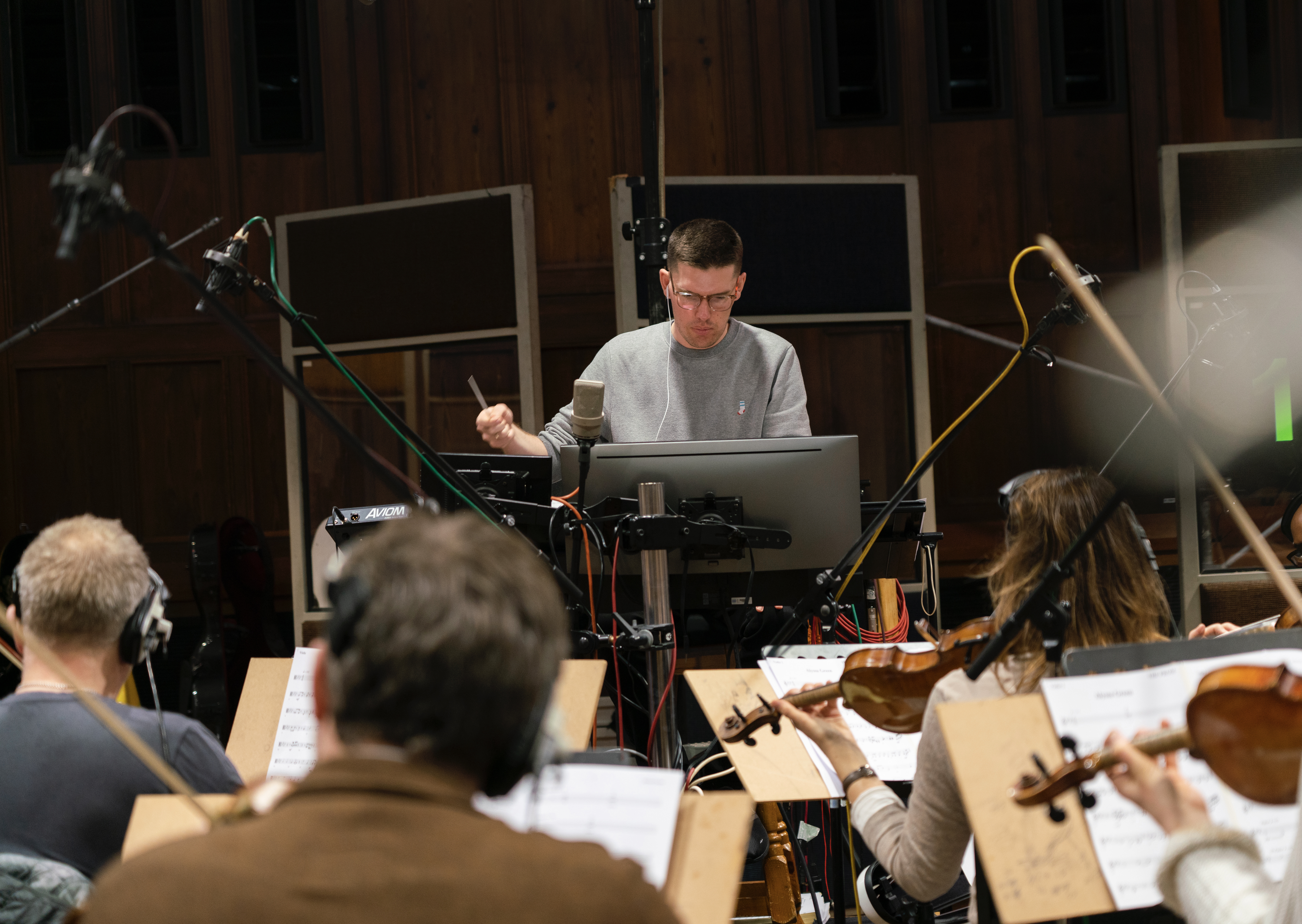
- Erik Arvinder conducting an ensemble

Background information
- Born: 1984 (age 41–42)
- Origin: Stockholm, Sweden
- Genres: Orchestral, Pop
- Occupations: Conductor, arranger, orchestrator, violinist, multi-instrumentalist
- Years active: 2004–present

Erik Mikael Arvinder (born 1984) is a Swedish violinist, multi-instrumentalist, arranger, orchestrator and conductor. He is known for his work across Europe and the United States, and for collaborations with international artists such as Harry Styles, Lady Gaga, Madonna, Ariana Grande, Coldplay, Childish Gambino and John Legend. Arvinder has worked as creative director for Leksand's Chamber Music Festival, concertmaster for several Nordic ensembles and founding member of the Vamlingbo Quartet. He is also the founder, conductor and creative director of Stockholm Studio Orchestra, a session orchestra of over 80 musicians, that has recorded music for over 2,500 songs as well as films, TV productions and video games with around 200 annual releases spanning genres.

== Early life and education ==
Born in Stockholm, Arvinder grew up in a musical family where both parents worked as musicians in Sweden's leading orchestras - his mother in the Royal Stockholm Philharmonic Orchestra and his father in the Swedish Radio Symphony Orchestra. He attended choir schools throughout his education, first Adolf Fredrik's Music School (elementary school), followed by Stockholms Musikgymnasium (high school). At the age of 13 he began performing as a violinist in the Stockholm Youth Symphony Orchestra.

=== Royal College of Music ===
Arvinder studied violin at the Royal College of Music in Stockholm. He completed a seven-year music education that included a bachelor's degree, a master's degree and a diploma program. Since graduating, he has returned to the Royal College of Music as an alumnus to participate in the panel discussion series 'Möt Musiklivet'.

== Career ==
Throughout his career, Arvinder has participated in a vast range of projects spanning classical music, pop music, scoring for film and television and commercial production. He is experienced with the many stages of classical and popular music production as a musician, arranger, orchestrator, composer and conductor.

=== Recorded Productions ===
Since 2010, Arvinder has been part of the band in the Swedish TV program Så mycket bättre, where he participates as a multi-instrumentalist.

Arvinder has worked with numerous international music artists, including Harry Styles, Lady Gaga, Madonna, Dolly Parton, Ariana Grande, Avicii, Coldplay, Childish Gambino and John Legend. His work in the film industry includes orchestration for films such as Creed (2015), and the Netflix musical comedy The Prom (2020). He has also contributed to Star Wars: The Force Awakens (2015) and television productions such as NBC's comedy Community and Netflix documentary series Chef's Table.

At the Nobel Banquet in 2024, Arvinder participated as conductor and string composer. The arrangement consisted of four acts of newly composed music by Bo Wastesson, Laleh and Gustaf Thörn. Arvinder contributed with string arrangements and conducted recordings of songs such as "When Good Ain't Good" and "Many Lights".

=== Live engagements ===
In 2008, at age 23, Arvinder became the youngest violinist to secure a permanent position with the Royal Stockholm Philharmonic Orchestra. Described as his “dream job”, he remained with the orchestra for two years before relocating to the United States in 2010.

Arvinder left the Royal Stockholm Philharmonic Orchestra to move to Los Angeles. There he initially planned to continue his studies, but quickly became busy with professional music projects with, among others, the Los Angeles Chamber Orchestra (LACO).

Between 2011 and 2013, Arvinder toured as a multi-instrumentalist with Childish Gambino playing violin, keyboard and percussion during the I Am Donald and Camp tours. In 2014, Arvinder toured as a violinist with John Legend during the All Of Me tour.

In 2017, together with Anthony Gonzalez (M83) and Chris Hartz (Passion Pit), Arvinder arranged and orchestrated the Cirque du Soleil show Volta.

In January and February 2025, Arvinder conducted the Swedish Radio Symphony Orchestra in a collaboration with the Swedish duo First Aid Kit at Berwaldhallen in Stockholm. The concerts received positive reviews for Arvinder's balanced and "ambitious" arrangements.

=== Awards ===
In April 2025, Arvinder received the Gold Award in the category "Artistry of the Year" at the Gyllene Hjulet gala, organized by Sponsrings- och Eventsverige (SES). The award was presented jointly with New Progress, LIWLIG, Arvid Svenugsson, and Aron Mellergårdh, in recognition of their work on the opening event for Forskaren, a new life science center in Stockholm.

According to the jury, the team was honored "for creating an experience where artistry and creative precision interacted in perfect harmony with the space. Through skillful execution and inventive composition, every detail elevated the whole, demonstrating that masterful event production is truly a craft."

== Selected discography ==
- Meghan Trainor - Toy With Me (2026) - String arranger, conductor, sound engineer
- Backstreet Boys - Bottle Up (2026) - Violin
- Taylor Swift - The Life of a Showgirl (2025) - Conductor, violin, sound engineer
- The Weeknd - Drive (2025) - Violin
- Lord Huron - The Cosmic Selector Vol. 1 (2025)
- Coldplay - JUPiTER (2024) - Violin
- Ariana Grande - bye (2024) - Violin
- Ariana Grande - imperfect for you - acoustic (2024) - Violin
- Kate Hudson - Glorious (2024) - String arranger, conductor
- Jennifer Hudson - Mary Did You Know (2024) - Orchestrator
- Sam Smith & Madonna - VULGAR (2023) - Violin
- *NSYNC & Justin Timberlake - Better Place (From TROLLS Band Together) (2023) - Violin
- Ed Sheeran - A Beautiful Game (2023) - Violin
- Loreen - Tattoo (2023) - String arranger, conductor
- Lord Huron - Your Other Life (2022) - Conductor
- FOX - Monarch (2022) - String arranger, conductor
- Netflix - Chef's Table Pizza (2022) - Orchestrator, conductor
- First Aid Kit - Palomino (2022) - String arranger, conductor
- Becky Hill & Galantis - Run (2022) - String arranger, conductor
- Lord Huron - Long Lost (2021) - Conductor
- The Knocks & Dragonette - Slow Song (2021) - String arranger, conductor
- Galantis & Years & Years - Sweet Talker (2021) - String arranger, conductor
- Royal Stockholm Philharmonic Orchestra & Ella Tiritiello - For A Better Day (2021) - Producer, arranger, conductor
- Netflix - The Prom (2020) - Lead orchestrator, conductor
- Galantis - Hurricane (with John Newman) (2020) - String arranger, conductor
- Galantis & Dolly Parton - Faith (feat. Mr. Probz) (2019) - String arranger, conductor
- James Arthur - Quite Miss Home (2019) - String arranger, conductor
- deadmau5 - Where's The Drop? (2018) - Arranger
- John Williams - Star Wars: The Last Jedi - Original motion picture soundtrack (2017) - Violin
- Morrisey - Low in High School (2017) - Viola
- Justin Timberlake & Mitchell Owens - The Book of Love - Original motion picture soundtrack (2017) - Violin
- Harry Styles - Harry Styles (2017) - Violin
- Galantis - The Aviary (2017) - String arranger, conductor
- Lady Antebellum - Heart Break (2017) - Viola
- Netflix - Chef's Table - (2017-2018) - Orchestrator
- Cirque du Soleil - Paramour (2016) - Arranger
- Cirque du Soleil - Volta (2016) - Arranger, orchestrator
- Michael Bublé - Nobody but Me (2016) - Violin
- Ludwig Göransson - Central Intelligence - Original motion picture soundtrack - (2016) - Orchestrator, violin
- Theodore Shapiro - Ghostbusters - Original motion picture soundtrack (2016) - Violin
- Ludwig Göransson - Creed - Original motion picture soundtrack (2015) - Orchestrator, violin
- Demi Lovato - Confident (2015) - Violin
- Avicii - Stories (2015) - String arranger, conductor
- John Williams - Star Wars: The Force Awakens - Original motion picture soundtrack (2015) - Violin
- Ellie Goulding - Delirium (2015), Violin
- Zara Larsson - Introducing EP (2014), String arranger, conductor
- Lupe Fiasco - Stellar Light (2014) - String arranger, conductor
- Lykke Li - I Never Learn (2014) - Violin
- Dirty Loops - Loopified (2014) - String arranger, conductor
- Childish Gambino - Because the Internet (2013) - String arranger, violin
- CeeLo Green - Cee Lo's Magic Moment (2012), Violin
- Ludwig Göransson - Community - Television soundtrack (2011-2015) - Orchestrator, conductor, violin
- Childish Gambino - Camp (2011) - String arranger, violin
- Robyn - Body Talk (2010) - Violin
- Lady Gaga - The Fame Monster (2009) - Violin
- Lykke Li - Youth Novels (2008) - Violin
- Peter Bjorn and John - Living Thing (2009) - Violin
- Primal Scream - Beautiful Future (2008) - Violin
