= JD Samson =

American musician

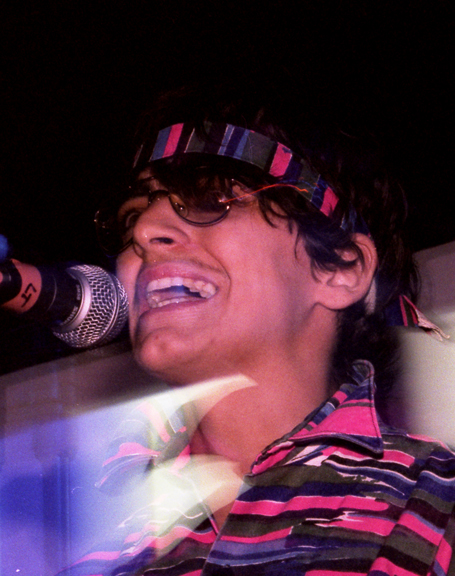
- Samson in 2004

Background information
- Born: Cleveland, Ohio, U.S.
- Occupation: Musician
- Years active: 2000–present
- Labels: Universal (Strummer); Iamsound; Mr. Lady
- Website: https://www.jdsamson.info/

Jocelyn Rachel Samson, known professionally as JD Samson, is an American musician, producer, songwriter, and DJ, best known as a member of the bands Le Tigre and MEN.

== Background ==
Jocelyn Rachel Samson grew up in Pepper Pike, Ohio, and attended Orange High School.

Samson came out as a lesbian at age 15 and is well known for her support of both LGBT and feminist causes. In high school, Samson played field hockey and was involved in her school's gay-straight alliance.

Samson graduated from Sarah Lawrence College in 2000, with a degree in film. While at school, Samson held jobs as a manager of a coffee shop, a campus tour guide, and as a research assistant for their queer-theory professor. Additionally, she co-produced and directed the Sarah Lawrence College Film and Video Festival while at school.

== Career ==
=== Le Tigre ===
Samson joined Le Tigre in 2000 when co-founder Sadie Benning left the band before the album Feminist Sweepstakes was recorded. Samson had previously worked as the band's projectionist and slide-show operator during live performances in support of their first record, Le Tigre. The self-proclaimed "underground electro-feminist performance artists" combined visuals, music and dance in their performances. Samson's contributions to Le Tigre include the song "Viz", which deals with her experiences as a member of a sexual minority, and "New Kicks," which contains excerpts of a protest that Samson recorded.

Feminist Sweepstakes came out in 2001 and was released on Mr. Lady Records & Videos in North America and on Chicks On Speed Records in Europe. Le Tigre's final album, This Island (2004), was the band's first on a major label (Universal Records). Ric Ocasek of the Cars produced one track, "Tell You Now". Samson and her Le Tigre bandmates Kathleen Hanna and Johanna Fateman also produced the Christina Aguilera song "My Girls", which features Peaches, for Aguilera's album Bionic. In the second half of 2006, the band decided to take an extended break.

In 2016, Le Tigre reunited to show support for Hillary Clinton's presidential campaign, releasing their first song in a decade entitled "I'm With Her".

=== JD Samson & MEN ===
In 2007, Samson and Fateman formed a new project, MEN, as a DJ, production, and remix team. After initial songwriting and outside remix work, Fateman took time off to have a child, and Samson recruited the members of her side band Hirsute, including Ladybug Transistor's Michael O'Neill and Ginger Brooks Takahashi, to perform live as MEN. Samson has said that their music speaks of "issues such as wartime economies, sexual compromise, and the demand for liberties through lyrical content and an inventive, high-energy stage show".

In 2009, MEN self-released an EP called MEN that sold out following US tours with Peaches and Gossip. MEN also toured in the UK and Europe during this time. Their debut album, Talk About Body, was released on February 1, 2011, via Iamsound in the US and through Sony/Columbia in Europe. The album included singles for the songs "Who Am I To Feel So Free", "Off Our Backs", and "Credit Card Babie$".

In the spring of 2012, MEN changed their name to JD Samson & MEN and released the EP Next in February, followed in September by the song "Let Them Out Or Let Me In" in support of the Russian feminist punk-rock collective Pussy Riot. JD Samson & MEN's second full-length album was titled Labor.

=== Other bands ===
Samson also has performed as a member of the band The New England Roses and as keyboard player of electro-punk artist Peaches' live band, The Herms, with Radio Sloan and Samantha Maloney. Samson collaborates with Nick van Hofwegen of Young N' Sick on their electro disco project, SHARER. In 2020 Samson released a minimal live to tape record with Roddy Bottum and Michael O'Neill under the name, CRICKETS.

=== Songwriting ===
Samson has a songwriting and publishing deal through Universal Music Publishing Group. Samson has written songs for Christina Aguilera ("My Girls feat. Peaches"), Junior Senior ("Can I Get Get Get"), Cobra Starship ("Shwick"), French Horn Rebellion ("Girls feat. JD Samson and Fat Tony"), The Aikiu, Bitch and Ferron, Pelifics ("Spray Painted Knuckles"), among others.

=== Performance art ===
Samson is a co-founder of the performance art group "Dykes Can Dance". In 2003, she released 'JD's Lesbian Calendar', a collaboration with photographer Cass Bird, which was followed up in 2006 with 'JD's Lesbian Utopia', a calendar documenting Samson's travels around the U.S. in an RV. Since then, JD has worked closely with choreographers Vanessa Anspaugh, Katy Pyle, and Julie Cunningham. Samson collaborated with filmmaker, Sam Green on a project for the 2019 Whitney Biennal and is currently working on another project with him.

=== Film/TV ===
Samson appeared in John Cameron Mitchell's 2006 film Shortbus as "Jid", a patron of the Shortbus club.

In 2010, Samson served as a judge at the 9th annual Independent Music Awards.

In 2016, Samson appeared in the Netflix series The Mr. Peabody and Sherman Show as a musical guest.

Samson hosted several Broadly interviews such as Last Lesbian Bar about the disappearing lesbian bar, and interviews with Margaret Cho, and Kate Nash.

In 2017, Samson played a small role as a New York artist in Odd Mom Out.

In 2019, Samson makes a brief appearance as a Postmates employee delivering food in the Netflix series Russian Doll.

In 2022, JD Samson was the composer and appeared in the documentary 32 Sounds.

In 2024, Samson won the Cinema Eye Honors Award for her composing work on the documentary "32 Sounds", an "immersive documentary that explores the elemental phenomenon of sound".

=== Writing ===
Samson wrote a widely quoted piece on the economics of being an artist for The Huffington Post in 2011. Titled "I Love My Job But It Made Me Poorer," the article examines the financial realities of a long-term career in music. In 2013, she began writing for Talkhouse. Samson has also written for Tom Tom Magazine and Creative Time Reports.

=== Teaching ===
Starting in 2016, Samson started teaching at NYU's Clive Davis Institute of Recorded Music, where she is currently an assistant arts professor. Additionally, Samson has lectured at the We Make Waves Festival, Bard College, TED X (CLE), and the Artists with a Conscience Conference at Amherst College

== Personal life ==
Samson has described herself as a lesbian, gender-nonconforming, and non-binary.
