= Painted (song) =

2015 single by MS MR

"Painted" is a song by American pop duo MS MR, from their album How Does It Feel, first released as a single in April 2015. The music video was directed by Tabitha Denholm, and is inspired by the 1979 Walon Green documentary The Secret Life of Plants, as well as by the works of Stanley Kubrick.

An official remix was subsequently released by Norwegian producer Hans-Peter Lindstrøm.

== Reception ==
Idolator called it "fantastic" and "jittery", noting the extent to which the song features a sample of Lizzy Plapinger chanting the phrase "What did you think would happen?" Nylon considered it to be a "fabulous omen" for the rest of the album; similarly, DIY described it as a "glistening extension" of MS MR's previous album Secondhand Rapture.

Spin called the songwriting "powerfully evocative", while Complex felt that the song was "driven by its relentless hook".
