= Joel Abbot =

Joel Abbot or Joel Abbott may refer to:

- Joel Abbot (naval officer) (1793–1855), United States Navy officer
- Joel Abbot (politician) (1776–1826), American politician from Georgia
- Joel Abbot (fl. 2010s), member of Australian rock band Bleeding Knees Club
- Lt. Joel Abbott (fl. 1860s), of the 8th Va. Cavalry (Confederate), participant in the Battle of Charleston (1862)
- Joel Abbott (fl. 1790s–1800s), original owner of the historic Robert Toombs House
