= Off Our Backs (song) =

Single by MEN

from the album Talk About Body
- Released: November 9, 2010
- Genre: Electropop
- Length: 3:59 (2010 single version); 4:33 (2009 version); 4:40 (2011 album version)
- Label: IAMSOUND
- Songwriters: JD Samson; Michael O'Neill; Ginger Brooks Takahashi

MEN singles chronology
| "Credit Card Babies" (2010) | "Off Our Backs" (2010) | "Who Am I To Feel So Free" (2011) |

Music video
- "Off Our Backs" on YouTube

"Off Our Backs" is the second pre-album-release single from MEN's debut album Talk About Body. It was released on November 9, 2010, available on 7" vinyl, 12" vinyl and CD single/EP. The track had previously been released on June 25, 2009 by "MEN MAKE MUSIC" (self-released) on a digital EP called "Limited Edition Demo" that included four tracks: the main single, two more songs - Credit Card Babies and Simultaneously - that would also later appear on Talk About Body, and the Jeppe's Money is a Major Issue Remix.

The title of the song is a nod to the feminist magazine of the same name "off our backs". The song's video features a tug-o-war between men and women with close-ups of sexually-implicit movements between members of the same sex.

== Track listing ==
7" Single
| No. | Title | Length |
|---|---|---|
| 1. | "Off Our Backs" | 3:59 |
| 2. | "Off Our Backs (Jeppe's Money is a Major Issue Remix)" | 5:14 |

12" Single/CD Single/EP
| No. | Title | Length |
|---|---|---|
| 1. | "Off Our Backs" | 3:59 |
| 2. | "Off Our Backs (Jeppe's Money is a Major Issue Remix)" | 5:14 |
| 3. | "Off Our Backs (Lemonade Remix)" | 5:03 |
| 4. | "Off Our Backs (Steven Bloodbath Remix)" | 4:59 |

== Quotations ==
"Off Our Backs is an addictive slice of electro brilliance, a sure-fire, 21st century pop anthem, with a soaraway chorus (“I’m/A tease/For nothing you can’t see”) and instantly memorable melody." - Hive Magazine

== Videos ==
In addition to the official video released by IAMSOUND Records and directed by Bryce Kass to coincide with the release of the single in November 2010, there were also two popular fan videos, one by K8 Hardy uploaded to YouTube April 14, 2009, and the other a live online recording from MEN's performance of the song from episode 4 of Dinner With the Band, uploaded to YouTube December 16, 2009.

== Remixes ==
Three remixes (Jeppe's Money is a Major Issue, Lemonade, and Steven Bloodbath) were released by IAMSOUND Records on the 12" single for Off Our Backs. In addition there is an unofficial "Pegase Remix" (length=4:16).
