= Janet's Planet =

American children's television show

Janet's Planet is an American educational children's television show hosted by Janet Ivey and her explorers. The show explores one topic per episode, such as "Mars", "Aviation", and "Microgravity". Janet's Planet originally aired on PBS and over 140 of its affiliated local public stations. The series aims to teach lessons about science to a preteen audience. The show has an appeal beyond the young audience by featuring national musical guests like Lord Huron and staples of classic children shows like puppets and animations. Janet's Planet also features engineers, designers, and makers like the designer of Lego's NASA Mars Science Laboratory Curiosity Rover. The television program has grown into a touring live stage show and related merchandise. Janet's Planet DVDs and New Media are frequently used in schools as an education source especially for STEM lessons.

== Production ==
Janet's Planet 2014–2015 season is produced by PopCause LLC.

== Honors ==
Janet's Planet is a recipient of 12 Regional Emmys, 5 Gracie Allen Awards, and Buzz Aldrin ShareScience Foundation Ambassador.

=== Characters ===
- Janet - Chief Scientist of Janet's Planet.
- Albert - the first ever monkey astronaut who on June 11, 1948, rode over 63 km (39 mi) on a V2 rocket. Albert had the honor of introducing Lord Huron as the musical guest for Janet's Planet.
- Marsella - the friendliest Extraterrestrial life, also known as an Alien, from the planet Mars. Marsella is the expert on the planet Mars.
