= The Night We Met =

Single by Lord Huron

from the album Strange Trails
- Released: April 24, 2017
- Studio: Whispering Pines (Los Angeles)
- Genre: Folk rock
- Length: 3:28
- Label: Iamsound
- Songwriter: Ben Schneider
- Producer: Ben Schneider

Lord Huron singles chronology
"Fool for Love" (2015)	"The Night We Met" (2017)	"Ancient Names (Part I)" (2018)

Lyric video
- "The Night We Met" on YouTube

"The Night We Met" is a song recorded by American band Lord Huron for their second studio album, Strange Trails (2015). Following its inclusion in the Netflix series 13 Reasons Why, "The Night We Met" entered the record charts in several countries, including in Australia, Canada, France, the United Kingdom, and the United States. It was certified eleven times platinum by the Recording Industry Association of America for combined sales and streaming figures exceeding eleven million units. The song, as of January 25, 2026, has amassed over 3.5 billion streams on Spotify.

== Background ==
"The Night We Met" was written and produced by frontman Ben Schneider, and mixed by Rick Parker. It was recorded at Whispering Pines in Los Angeles, California.

== Music and lyrics ==
The song has a length of 3:28. It is composed in the key of A major and a 9/8 and 12/8 mixed meter that moves at a tempo of 60 beats per minute, where each beat is three eighths. Schneider's vocal range spans one octave, from F♯4 to F♯5.

"You never fully move on from someone you've shared something so powerful with, for better or for worse, they haunt you for the rest of your life. That's an impossible ghost to get rid of, there's no spell, no incantation for that."

— Ben Schneider

In writing "The Night We Met", Schneider was inspired by "bittersweet teen romance" and pop songs from the 1950s, the latter of which he appreciated for the way their melodies and lyrics often contrasted with one another. He wanted the song to be about love, but with a focus on the feeling of regret at the end of a relationship. He described this relationship as one "where you've gone through so many wonderful things together but you feel like it wasn't worth it. You wish you could go back to the origin of the relationship, and instead of commencing it, go another way." Schneider was also inspired by horror fiction and how it evokes fear, an emotion which he connected to "the feelings of loss that go along with love". The song uses ghosts as metaphor for the way the memory of a person "can hang around and haunt you".

Schneider has described the duet version with Phoebe Bridgers as revealing both sides of the relationship. Comparing it to Wuthering Heights, he further described it as representing a relationship "where there's regret and remorse on both sides and both people are left with this feeling of being haunted".

== Release ==
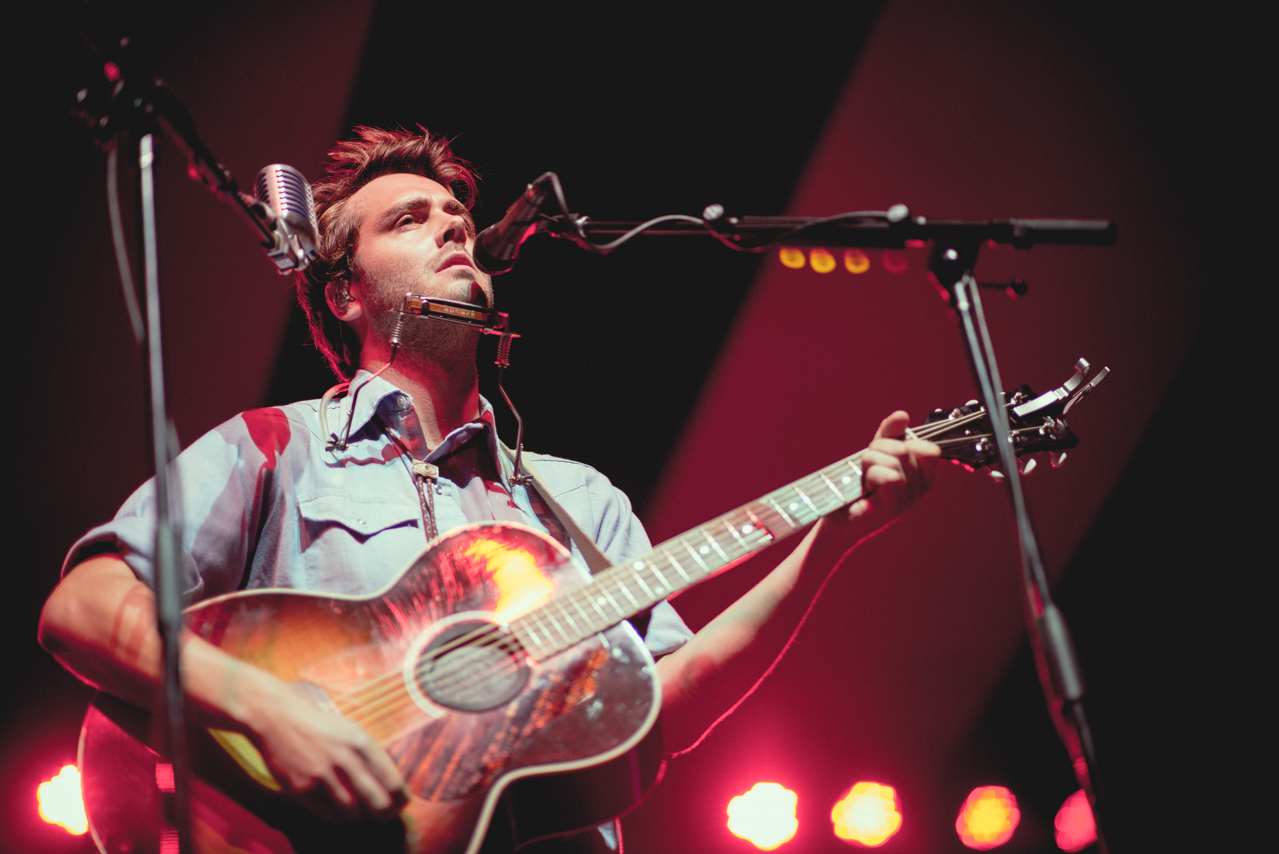
Ben Schneider of Lord Huron

The song was first released as a free download at strangetrails.com on January 27, 2015. On February 9, 2015, the album Strange Trails was announced alongside the official release of two singles: "Fool for Love" and "The Night We Met".

The song quickly achieved popularity after being featured in 13 Reasons Why, and it was subsequently certified platinum in the United States. The song has been streamed over three billion times. "The Night We Met" immediately turned into the band's most well known song. It appears in an episode 5 scene of 13 Reasons Why, where the main characters, Clay Jensen and Hannah Baker, dance together. After being featured in the show, the song garnered the band a record deal with Republic Records.

On May 18, 2018, as part of the soundtrack for the second season of 13 Reasons Why, Lord Huron released a new rendition of the song featuring Phoebe Bridgers. Bridgers' vocal for the duet version was recorded by Mike Bridavsky at Russian Recording in Bloomington, Indiana. In August 2019, Lord Huron was joined by Phoebe Bridgers for a performance of the song at the Hollywood Bowl.

"The Night We Met" reached number 5 on US Hot Rock Songs (Billboard), and number 7 on US Adult Alternative Songs (Billboard) charts.

The song was certified two-times platinum with 2 million units sold, and it was certified gold in France (with 100,000 units sold) and United Kingdom (with 400,000 units sold).

== Critical reception ==
Marissa Matozzo of Paste labelled the song as "one of the band's most renowned tracks". Erin Vierra of Mxdwn wrote, "'The Night We Met' is the kind of song one likes to hold on to late at night, the kind of song that fills the listener with a peaceful meditation." Under the Radar described the song as "heartbreaking waltz".

Julien A. Luebbers of The Spokesman-Review wrote that the song "puts its finger keenly on deep human longing and romance gone sour. The song's power comes both from its sheer ubiquity and its pared-down and harmonic composition".

== Charts ==
=== Weekly charts ===
2017–2018 weekly chart performance for "The Night We Met"
Chart (2017–2018)	Peak position
Australia (ARIA)	78
Belgium (Ultratop 50 Flanders)	44
Belgium (Ultratip Bubbling Under Wallonia)	14
Canada Hot 100 (Billboard)	58
France (SNEP)	160
Ireland (IRMA)	28
Netherlands Single Tip (MegaCharts)	8
Portugal (AFP)	50
Scottish Singles Sales (Official Charts)	60
Sweden (Sverigetopplistan)	83
Switzerland (Schweizer Hitparade)	74
UK Singles (Official Charts)	77
UK Indie (Official Charts)	2
US Billboard Hot 100	84
US Hot Rock & Alternative Songs (Billboard)	5
US Rock & Alternative Airplay (Billboard)	21

2022–2025 weekly chart performance for "The Night We Met"
Chart (2022–2025)	Peak position
Austria (Ö3 Austria Top 40)	21
Czech Republic Singles Digital (ČNS IFPI)	31
Germany (GfK)	69
Global 200 (Billboard)	37
Greece International (IFPI)	21
Iceland (Tónlistinn)	37
Ireland (IRMA)	17
Lithuania (AGATA)	58
Netherlands (Single Top 100)	38
Norway (VG-lista)	10
Philippines (Philippines Hot 100)	91
Poland (Polish Streaming Top 100)	48
Portugal (AFP)	81
Slovakia Singles Digital (ČNS IFPI)	37
Sweden (Sverigetopplistan)	24
Switzerland (Schweizer Hitparade)	10
UK Singles (Official Charts)	75
UK Indie (Official Charts)	2

=== Year-end charts ===
2017 year-end chart performance for "The Night We Met"
Chart (2017)	Position
US Hot Rock Songs (Billboard)	12

2023 year-end chart performance for "The Night We Met"
Chart (2023)	Position
Poland (Polish Streaming Top 100)	100

2024 year-end chart performance for "The Night We Met"
Chart (2024)	Position
Austria (Ö3 Austria Top 40)	33
Belgium (Ultratop 50 Flanders)	91
Belgium (Ultratop 50 Wallonia)	99
France (SNEP)	144
Germany (GfK)	99
Global 200 (Billboard)	35
Iceland (Tónlistinn)	38
Netherlands (Single Top 100)	56
Poland (Polish Streaming Top 100)	63
Portugal (AFP)	73
Sweden (Sverigetopplistan)	38
Switzerland (Schweizer Hitparade)	23
UK Singles (OCC)	60

2025 year-end chart performance for "The Night We Met"
Chart (2025)	Position
Austria (Ö3 Austria Top 40)	20
Belgium (Ultratop 50 Flanders)	128
Belgium (Ultratop 50 Wallonia)	119
France (SNEP)	194
Global 200 (Billboard)	31
Iceland (Tónlistinn)	45
Netherlands (Single Top 100)	42
Poland (Polish Streaming Top 100)	88
Sweden (Sverigetopplistan)	22
Switzerland (Schweizer Hitparade)	21
UK Singles (OCC)	91

== Certifications ==
Certifications for "The Night We Met"
Region	Certification	Certified units/sales
Belgium (BRMA)	Gold	20,000^{‡}
Brazil (Pro-Música Brasil)	Gold	30,000^{‡}
Denmark (IFPI Danmark)	3× Platinum	270,000^{‡}
France (SNEP)	Gold	100,000^{‡}
Germany (BVMI)	Platinum	400,000^{‡}
Italy (FIMI)	2× Platinum	200,000^{‡}
New Zealand (RMNZ)	8× Platinum	240,000^{‡}
Portugal (AFP)	5× Platinum	50,000^{‡}
Spain (Promusicae)	Platinum	100,000^{‡}
Spain (Promusicae) featuring Phoebe Bridgers	2× Platinum	120,000^{‡}
United Kingdom (BPI)	4× Platinum	2,400,000^{‡}
United States (RIAA)	11× Platinum	11,000,000^{‡}
Streaming
Greece (IFPI Greece)	Diamond	10,000,000^{†}
^{‡} Sales+streaming figures based on certification alone.^{†} Streaming-only figures based on certification alone.
