= Strange Trails =

Studio album by Lord Huron
- Released: April 7, 2015 (UK); April 8, 2015 (U.S.)
- Studio: Knecht Studios
- Genres: Indie rock; alternative rock; indie folk; alternative pop
- Length: 55:39
- Labels: Iamsound (U.S.); PIAS Recordings (UK)
- Producer: Ben Schneider

Lord Huron chronology
Lonesome Dreams (2012)	Strange Trails (2015)	Vide Noir (2018)

Singles from Strange Trails
- 1. "The Night We Met" Released: April 24, 2017

Strange Trails is the second studio album by indie rock band Lord Huron. It was released by PIAS Recordings on April 7, 2015, in the United Kingdom, and by Iamsound the next day in the United States. The album received positive reviews from music critics, and charted in Belgium, the United Kingdom, the United States, and Canada.

== Critical reception ==
Professional ratings
Aggregate scores
Source	Rating
Metacritic	74/100
Review scores
Source	Rating
AllMusic	3.5/5 stars
Austin Chronicle	3.5/5 stars
Blurt	3/5 stars
Drowned in Sound	6/10
musicOMH	3.5/5 stars
PopMatters	7/10 stars
Spin	8/10
Uncut	6/10
Under the Radar	7.5/10 stars

Strange Trails has received positive reviews from music critics. Metacritic, a review aggregator, indicates "generally favorable reviews", with an average score of 74 out of 100, based on 10 reviews. Rachel Brodsky of Spin called the album "enchanting from start to finish", praising the lyricism, vocals, and instrumentation. Abby Johnston of the Austin Chronicle wrote "If a pair of 2010 EPs approximated an untamed jungle and 2012's debut LP Lonesome Dreams a tree house amongst it, Lord Huron's sophomore full-length Strange Trails is Ben Schneider's completed bungalow, his little plot of land in lush wilds". Matt Conner of Under the Radar singled out "Meet Me in the Woods" as "undeniably Schneider's best work yet", and while noting that the album was slightly inconsistent in quality, praised it overall as "always beautiful" and "arresting". Marcy Donelson of AllMusic praised the album's "serene ambience and unconventional narrative" and its themes, though she also called the album unsurprising. Ben Hogwood of musicOMH spoke positively of the "melodic strength and songwriting craft while introducing more noticeable elements of vulnerability," while criticizing some of the lyricism.

John Paul of PopMatters said that "Lord Huron succeed in meeting the requisite criteria of their most direct influences and have crafted an album sure to appeal to those enamored of Phosphorescent, Fleet Foxes, and My Morning Jacket", comparing it favorably to the band's previous album. Lee Zimmerman of Blurt said that the album provided "plenty to ponder, and the album’s spectral tones and hallucinatory ambiance suggests that several listens will be needed to fully process the entire effort". In a more mixed review, Bud Scoppa of Uncut stated that "the blend is rich and the performances spirited, but the thin, reverberant sound prevents the tracks from hitting the ear with impact, as if they were mic’d from a distance in a barn". Christopher T. Sharpe of Drowned in Sound praised the lyricism and thematic ideas of the album, but criticized the songs themselves for "fall[ing] short". While he praised some songs, primarily "Hurricane", he concluded that it was "as if the band, having gone to all the effort of building the car from scratch, painting it Technicolor and made the perfect mixtape for their road trip, half-filled the tank and left the wheels uninflated".

The album will be used in the upcoming psychological slasher horror film "HIDE & SEEK 3". The song "The Yawning Grave" will be used in the film once.

== Track listing ==
All tracks are written by Ben Schneider.

No.	Title	Length
1.	"Love Like Ghosts"	3:44
2.	"Until the Night Turns"	3:47
3.	"Dead Man's Hand"	4:21
4.	"Hurricane (Johnnie's Theme)"	2:46
5.	"La Belle Fleur Sauvage"	5:41
6.	"Fool for Love"	4:34
7.	"The World Ender"	4:30
8.	"Meet Me in the Woods"	4:22
9.	"The Yawning Grave"	3:12
10.	"Frozen Pines"	3:57
11.	"Cursed"	3:58
12.	"Way Out There"	4:10
13.	"Louisa"	3:09
14.	"The Night We Met"	3:28
Total length:		55:39

== Personnel ==
Credits adapted from AllMusic.

Lord Huron

- Ben Schneider – lead vocals, guitars, producer, assistant engineer, artwork
- Mark Barry – drums, percussion, vocals, audio engineering
- Miguel Briseño – bass guitar, keyboards, vocals
- Tom Renaud – guitars, vocals
- Jessica Maros – vocals

Additional personnel

- Dave Cooley – audio mastering
- Ben Tolliday – audio engineering
- Rick Parker – audio mixing
- Kevin Kinsella – jacket design

== Charts ==
=== Weekly charts ===
Chart (2015–2017)	Peak position
Belgian Albums (Ultratop Flanders)	108
Canadian Albums (Billboard)	16
Scottish Albums (Official Charts)	77
UK Albums (Official Charts)	95
UK Independent Albums (Official Charts)	16
US Billboard 200	23
US Americana/Folk Albums (Billboard)	1
US Independent Albums (Billboard)	2
US Top Alternative Albums (Billboard)	2
US Top Rock Albums (Billboard)	2
US Indie Store Album Sales (Billboard)	8

Chart (2024–2025)	Peak position
UK Album Downloads (Official Charts)	36
Dutch Albums (Album Top 100)	94

=== Year-end charts ===
Chart (2017)	Position
US Top Rock Albums (Billboard)	92

== Certifications ==
Region	Certification	Certified units/sales
Denmark (IFPI Danmark)	Platinum	20,000^{‡}
United States (RIAA)	Platinum	1,000,000^{‡}
^{‡} Sales+streaming figures based on certification alone.
