= Long Lost (album) =

Studio album by Lord Huron
- Released: May 21, 2021
- Studio: Whispering Pines (Los Angeles); Baggpipe (Stockholm)
- Genre: Baroque pop; folk; outlaw country; rock and roll
- Length: 58:13
- Label: Republic; Whispering Pines
- Producer: Ben Schneider

Lord Huron chronology
Vide Noir (2018)	Long Lost (2021)	Music for The Starling Girl (2023)

Singles from Long Lost
- 1. "Not Dead Yet" Released: February 19, 2021; 2. "Mine Forever" Released: March 19, 2021; 3. "Long Lost" Released: April 16, 2021; 4. "I Lied" Released: April 30, 2021

Professional ratings
Aggregate scores
Source	Rating
AnyDecentMusic?	8.1/10
Metacritic	88/100
Review scores
Source	Rating
AllMusic	4/5 stars
American Songwriter	4/5 stars
Gigwise	7/10 stars
God Is in the TV	9/10
The Independent	5/5 stars
Mojo	4/5 stars
musicOMH	4/5 stars
Spectrum Culture	4/5 stars
The Spill Magazine	3.5/5 stars
Sputnikmusic	5/5
Uncut	8/10

Long Lost is the fourth studio album by American indie folk band Lord Huron. It was released on May 21, 2021, by Republic Records. The album received widespread acclaim from music critics who praised its poetic lyricism, somber production & refined vocal harmonies.

== Release and promotion ==
In December 2020, the band announced a collection of live-streamed shows entitled Alive from Whispering Pines.

== Track listing ==
All tracks are written by Ben Schneider.

No.	Title	Length
1.	"The Moon Doesn't Mind"	1:10
2.	"Mine Forever"	4:48
3.	"(One Helluva Performer)"	0:21
4.	"Love Me Like You Used To"	3:40
5.	"Meet Me in the City"	3:54
6.	"(Sing for Us Tonight)"	0:04
7.	"Long Lost"	4:44
8.	"Twenty Long Years"	4:50
9.	"Drops in the Lake"	4:01
10.	"Where Did the Time Go"	1:33
11.	"Not Dead Yet"	2:57
12.	"(Deep Down Inside Ya)"	0:24
13.	"I Lied" (with August Ponthier)	3:54
14.	"At Sea"	1:35
15.	"What Do it Mean"	5:53
16.	"Time's Blur"	14:18
Total length:		58:13

=== Notes ===
- Tracks 3, 6, and 12 are interludes, and are not included in the track list on vinyl and cassette versions of the album.
- On physical releases, August Ponthier is credited as a featured vocalist in the song "I Lied".

== Personnel ==
Credits adapted from the album's liner notes.

=== Lord Huron ===
- Mark Barry – performance, additional production, engineering
- Ben Schneider – performance, production, engineering, string arrangements, mixing on "Time's Blur", artwork
- Tom Renaud – performance
- Miguel Briseño – performance

=== Additional contributors ===
- Brett Farkas – acoustic guitar on "Mine Forever" and "Drops in the Lake"
- Alexis Faucomprez – lame sonore on "Drops in the Lake"
- Greg Leisz – pedal steel and lap steel on "Twenty Long Years" and "At Sea"
- August Ponthier – featured vocals on "I Lied"
- Adam Tressler – acoustic guitar, electric guitar, and mandolin on "Love Me Like You Used To", "Not Dead Yet", and "What Do It Mean"
- Brandon Walters – acoustic guitar on "Long Lost"
- Natalie Hanna Mendoza – background vocals
- Lia Booth – background vocals
- Jamie Van Der Sluys – background vocals
- Jake Tikner – background vocals
- Gregory Fletcher – background vocals
- Eric Byers – string arrangements
- Erik Arvinder – conducting
- Willem Bleeker – strings engineering
- Fredrik Syberg – violin
- Daniel Migdal – violin
- Shahar Rosenthal – violin
- Oscar Treitler – violin
- Kristina Ebbersten – violin
- Simona Bonfigliolil – violin
- Conny Lindgren – violin
- Ylva Larsdotter – violin
- Hanna Helgegren – violin
- Henrik Naimark – violin
- Jannika Gustafsson – violin
- Daniel Frankel – violin
- Sarah Cross – violin
- Erik Holm – viola
- Matilda Brunström – viola
- Riikka Repo – viola
- Kim Hellgren – viola
- Pär Lindqvist – viola
- Albin Uusijärvi – viola
- Fred Lindberg – cello
- Amalie Stalheim – cello
- Natalia Goldmann – cello
- Josef Alin – cello
- Sigrid Granit – double bass
- Hilda Holm – flute
- Albin Grahn – trumpet
- Martin Schöpfer – French horn
- Sven Andersson – saxophone
- Wojtek Goral – saxophone
- Ben Tolliday – additional production
- Paul Butler – mixing on all tracks except "Time's Blur"
- Reuben Cohen – mastering
- Justin Schneider – jacket copy

== Charts ==
Chart performance for Long Lost
Chart (2021)	Peak position
Scottish Albums (Official Charts)	77
Swiss Albums (Schweizer Hitparade)	77
US Billboard 200	23
US Americana/Folk Albums (Billboard)	1
US Top Alternative Albums (Billboard)	2
US Top Rock Albums (Billboard)	3
