= August Ponthier =

American singer-songwriter (born 1996)

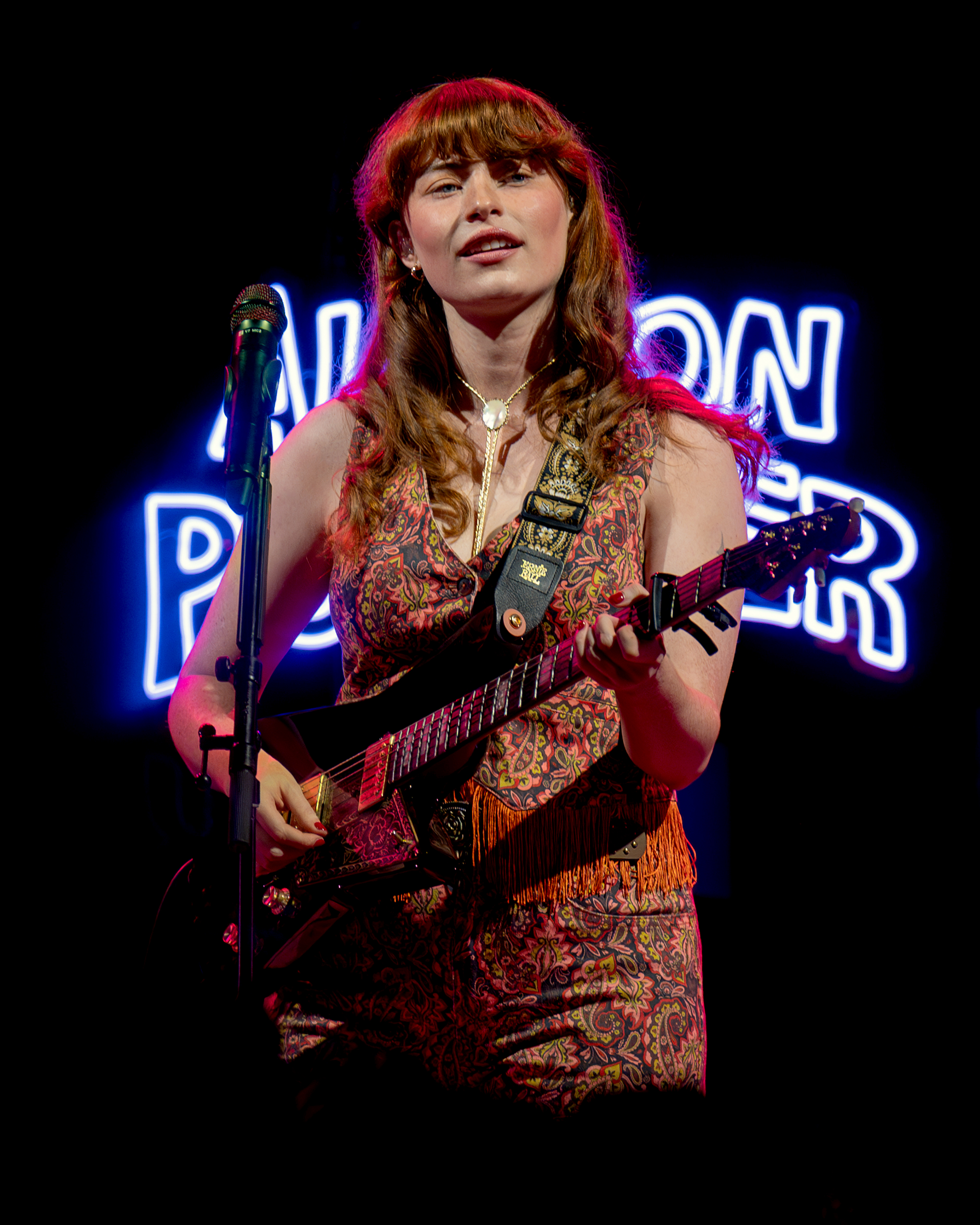
- Ponthier in October 2024

Background information
- Born: Allison Ponthier; February 26, 1996 (age 30); Allen, Texas, U.S.
- Genres: Indie folk; country
- Occupations: Singer; songwriter; guitarist
- Instruments: Vocals; guitar; piano
- Years active: 2020–present
- Website: augustponthier.com

August Ponthier (born February 26, 1996) is an American indie folk singer-songwriter. Their debut EP Faking My Own Death was released in 2021, and their second EP Shaking Hands With Elvis was released in 2022. Their third EP, Breaking the Fourth Wall, was released in 2024 and their debut album, Everywhere Isn’t Texas, was released on February 13th, 2026.

== Early life and education ==
Ponthier was born and raised in the town of Allen, a suburb of Dallas, Texas, and studied jazz at the University of North Texas before moving to Brooklyn, New York in 2017 at age 20. In New York, they held a variety of creative jobs, including contributing to the Museum of Natural History's Snapchat account, modeling, selling handmade jewelry, and drawing custom pet portraits.

In 2019, Ponthier began posting to TikTok, with their work including song covers, songs adapted with what Billboard describes as "queer-themed lyrics", stop motion animation, and duets. They were signed to Interscope Records in 2020.

== Career ==
In August 2021, Ponthier released their debut EP Faking My Own Death. The debut single from the EP, "Cowboy", was named one of the "25 Best Songs By LGBTQ Artists of 2021 (So Far)" by Billboard on June 29, 2021.

Ponthier wrote "Cowboy" in 2017 after moving to New York, but delayed its release, explaining to The Guardian in 2021, "because I was a little teen hipster rebel I was like: 'I don’t need country music, I don’t want to make that.' But I was so wrong, because it was an amazing way to express myself." They told American Songwriter they wrote "Cowboy" after they met their girlfriend and while they were processing what they described as the "culture shock" of their move to New York and their need to come out about their sexual orientation, and told Atwood Magazine, "I guess it was time to live my truth as a gay cowboy." For the "Cowboy" video, Ponthier has cited Death Becomes Her, The Witches, and Troll 2 as some of the many films that served as inspiration for their work with director Jordan Bahat on the creative direction of the video.

The second single released from the EP was "Harshest Critic" in May 2021, which they co-wrote with Adam Melchor. Ponthier wrote the song "Hell is a Crowded Room" with Rick Nowels, and in a review of the song for NPR Music, Ann Powers writes, "Ponthier invokes Chris Isaak invoking Roy Orbison, Cat Power invoking Peggy Lee, Lana Del Rey invoking every singer David Lynch ever ushered onto the stage of Twin Peaks's Bang Bang Bar."

Ponthier is a featured vocalist on the track "I Lied" from Lord Huron's 2021 Long Lost album. They performed with the band on The Tonight Show Starring Jimmy Fallon in May 2021, and toured with them in September 2021. Following the tour, they performed at Texas's Austin City Limits Music Festival.

In January 2022, Jack Antonoff announced that Ponthier would be joining him for Bleachers' 2022 tour.

In June 2022, Ponthier released their second EP Shaking Hands With Elvis. According to Billboard, "Half the songs on the 6-track project sound like sonic cousins of her previous work [...] But the other half of the songs, including standout single “Autopilot” and the high-camp fantasy “Hollywood Forever Cemetery,” sees the singer getting more experimental and dreamy with their sound".

In May 2024, Ponthier released their third EP Breaking the Fourth Wall.

After being dropped from Interscope, Ponthier released their first full-length album, Everywhere Isn't Texas, on February 13th, 2026. Their first headline tour, The Karaoke Queen, occurred mid-2025.

== Personal life ==
On October 15, 2025, Ponthier came out as nonbinary through an article in Them, using they/them pronouns and going by a new name, August. They continue to identify as a lesbian, attributing their "expansive view of gender to their experiences in sapphic spaces."

== Discography ==
=== Albums ===
- Everywhere Isn't Texas (2026)

=== Extended plays ===
- Faking My Own Death (2021)
- Shaking Hands With Elvis (2022)
- Breaking the Fourth Wall (2024)
