= The Cosmic Selector, Vol. 1 =

Studio album by Lord Huron
- Released: July 18, 2025
- Genres: Indie folk; indie rock; Americana; psychedelic
- Label: Mercury
- Producers: Ben Schneider, Matthew Neighbour

Lord Huron chronology
Long Lost (2021)	The Cosmic Selector, Vol. 1 (2025)

The Cosmic Selector, Vol. 1 is the fifth studio album from the American indie-folk band Lord Huron. A concept album released in July 2025, it includes performances by Kristen Stewart and Kazu Makino of Blonde Redhead.

== Background and concept ==
The Cosmic Selector, Vol. 1 was produced primarily by Ben Schneider and Matthew Neighbour. According to Schneider, the concept for The Cosmic Selector, Vol. 1 was developed over the course of several years and was released in July 2025. The plot's central jukebox character allegedly began to appear in the band's music videos around five years before The Cosmic Selector, Vol. 1 was released and before it was developed.

The album has been described as a consideration of the choices that contribute to a person's life and the repercussions of altering one's predestined fate.

According to the Los Angeles Times, Schneider credited inspiration for the album to his interest in the relationship between mystery and beauty in subjects such as love, the cosmos, and consciousness. The album's title and concept were also reportedly influenced by science fiction and fantasy media, such as The Twilight Zone, as well as older science-fiction magazines and novels.

== Music and themes ==
The album incorporates indie folk, indie rock, Americana and psychedelic music. Its arrangements include instruments such as synthesizers, guitars, keyboards, strings. The songs examine different aspects of the album's central themes. Schneider stated that the lyrics pose questions rather than attempt to give definitive answers.

== Release and promotion ==
The album was announced in May 2025, alongside the release of "Looking Back", which became its third preview single. Earlier promotional singles included "Who Laughs Last", featuring Kristen Stewart, and "Nothing I Need".

The album was released on July 18, 2025, through Mercury Records.

== Critical reception ==
The Cosmic Selector, Vol. 1 received reviews from several music publications. It was received generally positively. Reviewers noted the record for its reported cinematic atmosphere and combination of musical styles associated with earlier Lord Huron releases.

== Track listing ==
All songs were written by Ben Schneider.

1. "Looking Back"
2. "Bag of Bones"
3. "Nothing I Need"
4. "Is There Anybody Out There"
5. "Who Laughs Last" (featuring Kristen Stewart)
6. "The Comedian"
7. "Watch Me Go"
8. "Fire Eternal" (featuring Kazu Makino)
9. "It All Comes Back"
10. "Used to Know"
11. "Digging Up the Past"
12. "Life Is Strange"

== Personnel ==
=== Lord Huron ===
- Ben Schneider – vocals, songwriting, production
- Mark Barry – drums, percussion, additional production
- Miguel Briseño – bass, synthesizers
- Tom Renaud – guitar

=== Additional performers ===
The album features contributions from actress Kristen Stewart and singer Kazu Makino.

Stewart appears on "Who Laughs Last" with spoken-word passages alongside Schneider. Schneider reportedly considered Stewart for the part after watching several films in which she had appeared, particularly those directed by Olivier Assayas. Stewart also appears in the music video for the song.

Kazu Makino, the vocalist of the alternative rock band Blonde Redhead, sings on the song "Fire Eternal".
