= Lonesome Dreams =

Studio album by Lord Huron
- Released: October 12, 2012
- Length: 45:11
- Label: Iamsound (U.S.)
- Producer: Ben Schneider

Lord Huron chronology
Lonesome Dreams (2012)	Strange Trails (2015)

Lonesome Dreams is the debut studio album by American indie rock band Lord Huron, released on October 9, 2012, on Iamsound in the U.S. It debuted at No. 5 on Billboard's Heatseekers Albums chart.

With the release of Lonesome Dreams, the band released a series of music videos filmed in a western '70s style, which Schneider says was the focal point and narrative for the album. "We had this fun idea that Lonesome Dreams was kind of this series of old adventure tales." In an interview, Schneider alluded to influence from a specific work, called The Collected Works of Billy the Kid: Left-Handed Poems. "It's sort of a collection of pulp fiction and we wanted the videos to kind of reflect that and have that same feel and style", Schneider said during another interview. They also decided to release a theatrical version of the videos.

== Track listing ==
All tracks are written by Ben Schneider.

Lonesome Dreams track listing
No.	Title	Length
1.	"Ends of the Earth"	4:44
2.	"Time to Run"	5:23
3.	"Lonesome Dreams"	4:15
4.	"Ghost on the Shore"	4:37
5.	"She Lit a Fire"	4:30
6.	"I Will Be Back One Day"	3:25
7.	"The Man Who Lives Forever"	5:18
8.	"Lullaby"	4:00
9.	"Brother (Last Ride)"	4:00
10.	"In the Wind"	4:59
Total length:		45:11

== Charts ==
Chart performance for Lonesome Dreams
Chart (2012–2013)	Peak position
Belgian Albums (Ultratop Flanders)	64
Irish Albums (IRMA)	97
US Billboard 200	179
