= Vide Noir =

Studio album by Lord Huron
- Released: April 20, 2018
- Recorded: 2016–2017
- Studios: Whispering Pines (Los Angeles); Blautöne (Vienna)
- Genre: Rock
- Length: 48:55
- Labels: Republic; Whispering Pines
- Producer: Ben Schneider

Lord Huron chronology
| Strange Trails (2015) | Vide Noir (2018) | Long Lost (2021) |

Vide Noir is the third studio album and major-label debut by American rock band Lord Huron. It was released on April 20, 2018, by Republic Records. The album received positive reviews from the music critics and peaked at number nine on the Billboard 200, becoming the band's highest-charting album in the United States.

== Background ==
After recording their second album, Strange Trails, in 2014, and releasing it in early 2015, the band toured heavily in support of its release during the following few years. This exposure eventually led to the band's song, "The Night We Met,” being featured in the Netflix show 13 Reasons Why. The feature led to the song breaking into the Billboard US all-format Hot 100 chart at number 84. The song's mainstream breakthrough caught the attention of Republic Records. After signing, the band began to work on their third studio album.

== Writing and recording ==
The album was their first to be recorded on a major record label. The album was mixed by veteran music producer Dave Fridmann, who the band chose to work with due to his previous work with Tame Impala, The Flaming Lips, and Baroness.

== Themes and composition ==
The album's title, Vide Noir, is French for "Black Void". Frontman and lyricist Ben Schneider stated that he drew influence for writing the album from wandering around Los Angeles at night. He explained:

"My nighttime drives ranged all over the city — across the twinkling grid of the valley, into the creeping shadows of the foothills, through downtown’s neon canyons and way out to the darksome ocean, I started imagining Vide Noir as an epic odyssey through the city, across dimensions, and out into the cosmos. A journey along the spectrum of human experience. A search for meaning amidst the cold indifference of The Universe."

Schneider noted a slight change in sound for the band in the album; noting that it was more of a "very bass- and drums-heavy record" and that "There’s plenty of acoustic guitar still on there, but usually, it’s distorted and blown to shit." Spin Magazine and NPR noted that the song "Ancient Names (Part 1)" possessed the band's usual indie folk rock sound, while "Ancient Names (Part 2)" was described as moving into a more garage rock sounding sound. Conversely, "Wait by the River" was described as having a waltz-like sound with the vocals of an obsessive narrator.

== Release and promotion ==
On January 26, 2018, the band announced the album's name - Vide Noir and its release date, as April 20, 2018. The same date, the band also premiered the first two songs from the album, "Ancient Names (Part 1)" and "Ancient Names (Part 2)". A third song, "Wait by the River", was released ahead of the album on February 16, 2018, and another released on March 30, 2018, titled "When the Night Is Over." "Ancient Names (Part 1)" would peak at number 45 on the Billboard Hot Rock Songs chart, while "Wait by the River" would peak at number 17 on the same chart, number 22 on the Billboard Adult Alternative Songs chart.

On March 30, 2018, seven songs from the album were made available to stream at specific geo-locations across the United States, Canada, the UK, and Australia. Using followtheemeraldstar.com and a mobile device with GPS, such as a smartphone, the user was guided to the hand-selected locations, including national parks, hikes, beaches, and even a volcano, where they could then listen to one song.

The band also launched a Vide Noir public access television show in select American cities. This was designed to be an immersive program that "expands upon the album's narratives and themes while showcasing the hidden world that inhabits Vide Noir". This program was also streamed on Twitch for worldwide viewing on April 19, 2018.

The band began its tour to support the album, starting the day of release, April 20, in Grand Rapids, Michigan, and moved throughout North America until ending in Denver, Colorado in October 2018.

== Reception ==
Professional ratings
Aggregate scores
| Source | Rating |
|---|---|
| Metacritic | 71/100 |
Review scores
| Source | Rating |
| The Guardian | 4/5 stars |
| The Line of Best Fit | 8/10 |
| musicOMH | 3.5/5 stars |
| NME | 3/5 stars |
| PopMatters | 7/10 |
| Spin | 7/10 |

Under the Radar magazine praised the album, describing it as "easily the band's most musically striking release to date" and stating that it "hold[s] the same grounded grooves fans and critics have come to appreciate from their first two albums,...but layered atop and around Ben Schneider's rooted compositions are psychedelic frills, fuzzed out guitars, and foreign instrumentation.

== Track listing ==
All tracks are written by Ben Schneider.

Vide Noir track listing
| No. | Title | Length |
|---|---|---|
| 1. | "Lost in Time and Space" | 4:44 |
| 2. | "Never Ever" | 2:52 |
| 3. | "Ancient Names (Part I)" | 6:02 |
| 4. | "Ancient Names (Part II)" | 2:05 |
| 5. | "Wait by the River" | 3:11 |
| 6. | "Secret of Life" | 3:50 |
| 7. | "Back from the Edge" | 3:03 |
| 8. | "The Balancer's Eye" | 4:29 |
| 9. | "When the Night Is Over" | 5:12 |
| 10. | "Moonbeam" | 4:19 |
| 11. | "Vide Noir" | 4:30 |
| 12. | "Emerald Star" | 4:38 |
| Total length: | | 48:55 |

== Personnel ==
Credits adapted from the album's liner notes.

=== Lord Huron ===
- Mark Barry – performance, additional production, engineering, horn arrangements
- Miguel Briseño – performance, engineering, horn arrangements
- Tom Renaud – performance, engineering, horn arrangements
- Ben Schneider – performance, production, engineering, horn arrangements

=== Additional contributors ===
- Allison Allport – harp
- Eric Byers – cello, string arrangement on "When the Night Is Over"
- Mike Cordone – trumpet, flugelhorn, horn arrangements
- Mike Eiya – tenor saxophone, horn arrangements
- Serena McKinney – violin
- Cindy Mong – viola
- Sacha Schneider – harp, vocals
- Leon Silva – tenor saxophone, baritone saxophone, horn arrangements
- Sonny DiPerri – additional production, engineering
- Ben Tolliday – additional vocal production, engineering
- Rick Parker – engineering
- Dave Fridmann – mixing
- Michael Fridmann – engineering assistance
- Greg Calbi – mastering

== Charts ==
=== Weekly charts ===
| Chart (2018) | Peak position |
|---|---|
| Belgian Albums (Ultratop Flanders) | 134 |
| Canadian Albums (Billboard) | 40 |
| Scottish Albums (Official Charts) | 70 |
| US Billboard 200 | 9 |
| US Top Alternative Albums (Billboard) | 2 |
| US Top Rock Albums (Billboard) | 2 |

=== Year-end charts ===
| Chart (2018) | Position |
|---|---|
| US Top Rock Albums (Billboard) | 94 |
