= MEN (band) =

US band and art/performance collective (2007–2014)

JD Samson & MEN
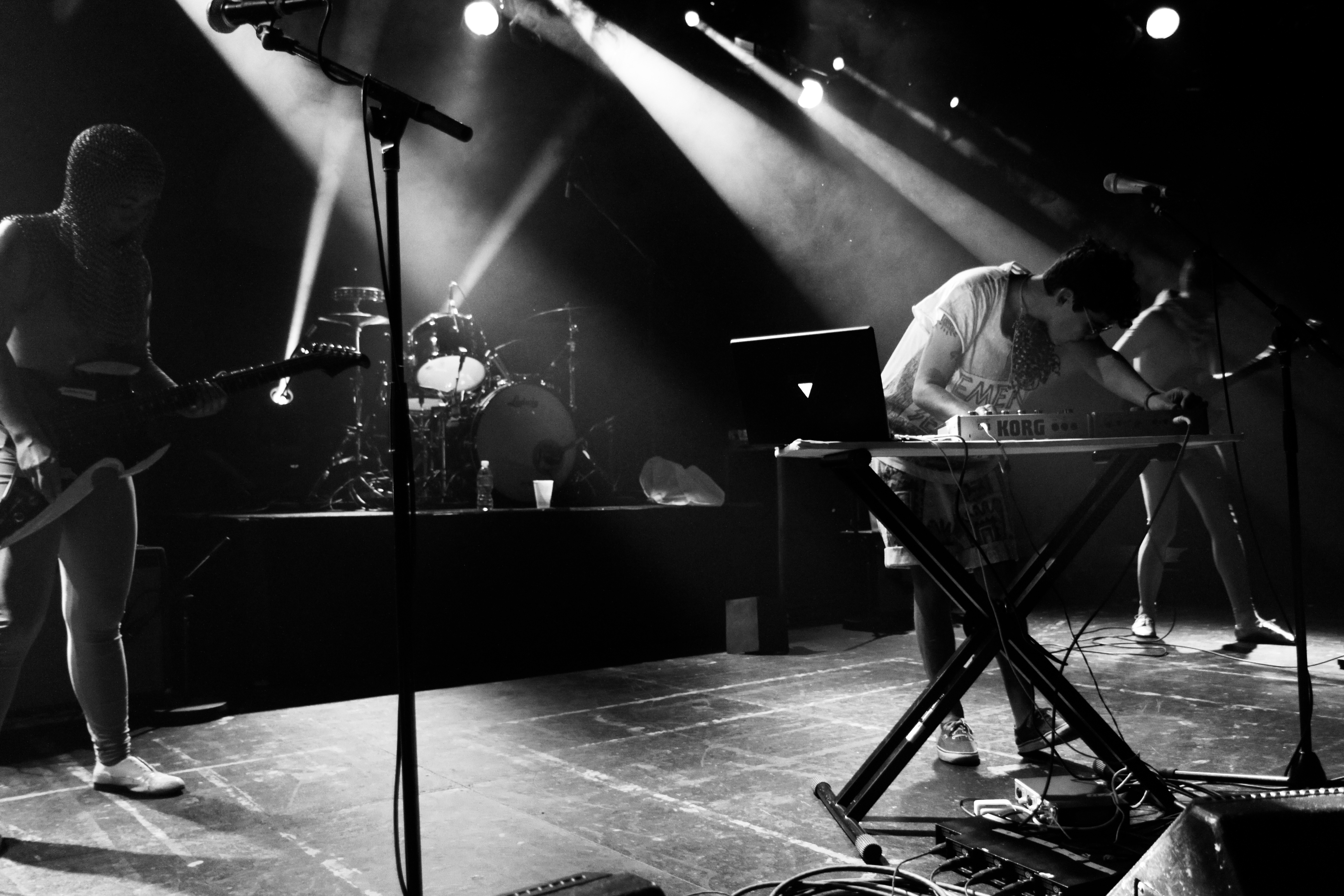
- MEN performing at the Commodore Ballroom (2009).

Background information
- Origin: New York City, New York, USA
- Genres: Electropop, LGBT music
- Years active: 2007–2014
- Labels: MEN Make Music; Sony; Columbia; Iamsound; Trouble
- Past members: JD Samson; Michael O'Neill; Tami Hart with Johanna Fateman; Emily Roysdon; Ginger Brooks Takahashi
- Website: http://www.menmakemusic.com

JD Samson & MEN, originally named simply MEN, was a Brooklyn-based band and art/performance collective that focuses on the energy of live performance and the radical potential of dance music. MEN spoke to issues such as trans awareness, wartime economies, sexual compromise, and demanding civil liberties. The collective disbanded in late 2014.

== History ==
The group began in 2007 as the DJ/production/remix team of Le Tigre members JD Samson and Johanna Fateman. When the duo began to write new songs, it made sense to merge their efforts with Samson's other new project called Hirsute. By 2008, Samson was involved writing songs in another project called Hirsute; along with Samson this group consisted of Michael O'Neill (Princess, Ladybug Transistor), Ginger Brooks Takahashi (LTTR, The Ballet) and Emily Roysdon. Fateman stepped back from the project after she became pregnant and wanted a break from touring. Samson then merged Hirsute into MEN, although Roysdon soon took a step back, making the core group Samson, O'Neill and Takahashi.

In 2009 MEN self-released an EP called MEN that sold out following US tours with Peaches and Gossip. MEN also toured in the UK and Europe during this time.

In early 2011, Takahashi left the group and was replaced by Tami Hart. MEN's debut album Talk About Body was released on February 1, 2011 via Iamsound Records in the US and through Sony/Columbia in Europe. Fateman and Roysdon are credited on the album but not listed as group members.

In February 2012, the group released the Next EP on their own MEN Make Music label. Until that spring, the band was known simply as MEN, but changed the name to JD Samson & MEN for clarity and to emphasize the collaborative nature of the musical efforts on record and on stage.

In response to the arrest of members of the Russian feminist punk rock protest group Pussy Riot in 2012, JD Samson & MEN released a single and music video entitled Let Them Out Or Let Me In. Samson has been an active member and spokesperson of the Free Pussy Riot movement.

JD Samson & MEN released their second studio album, Labor, in October 2013, preceded by the release of two singles from the album including "All The Way Thru", for which they teamed up with French producer Yuksek. The album was self-released on the MEN Make Music label.

In late 2014, Samson decided to dissolve the MEN collective and move on to other projects.

== Discography ==
=== Albums ===
- Talk About Body (Iamsound Records) February 1, 2011
- Labor (MEN Make Music) October 22, 2013

=== EPs ===
- MEN - (MEN Make Music) June 25, 2009
- Next - (MEN Make Music) February 21, 2012

=== Singles ===
- "Credit Card Babies" - (Trouble Records) September 6, 2010
- "Off Our Backs" - (Iamsound Records) November 9, 2010
- "Who Am I To Feel So Free" - album version/Antony version - February 14, 2011
- "Let Them Out or Let Me In" - non-album single - October 1, 2012
- "All the Way Thru" - August 20, 2013
- "Making Art" - September 17, 2013
- "Club Thang" - November 12, 2013

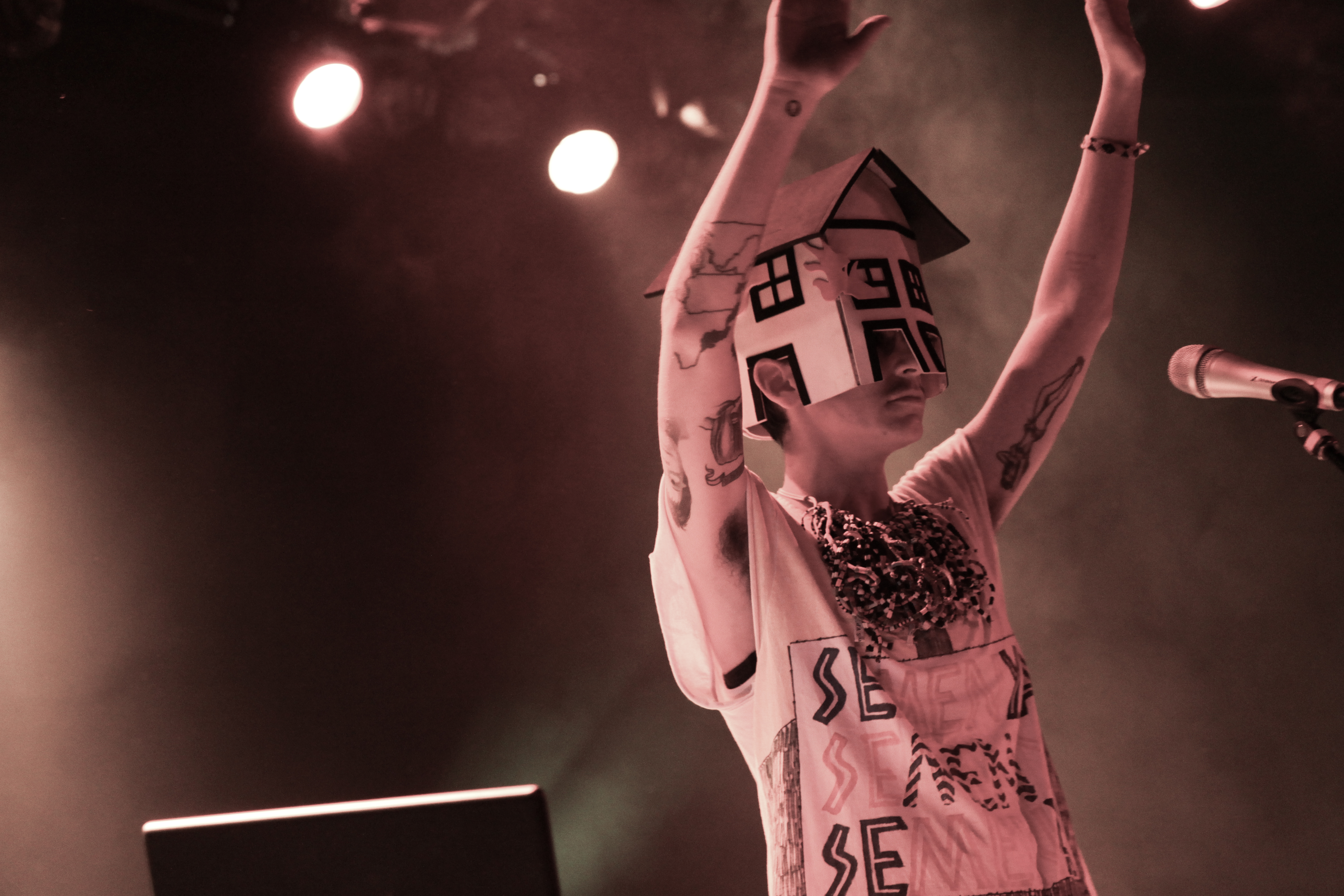
JD Samson performing with MEN at the Commodore Ballroom
