= T.O.L.D. =

- Also known as: TOLD, The Order of Life and Death
- Born: Daniel James Smith; 18 December, 1989; Birmingham, UK
- Origin: Hollywood
- Genres: Electropop; synthpop
- Occupations: Singer; songwriter; record producer
- Years active: 2014–present
- Label: Iamsound Records

Daniel James Smith, known professionally as T.O.L.D. (The Order of Life and Death), is a British singer, songwriter and record producer based in Los Angeles. Smith's stage name was inspired by Gustav Klimt's painting "Death and Life."

Smith was born in Birmingham, England. He first toured in the U.K. at age 16 but began working under the name T.O.L.D. in 2014. That year Smith released "Lucifer’s Eyes", which became his best-known song. Shortly after, he released his first EP, Heaven. This was followed in 2016 by his debut album, It's Not About the Witches. T.O.L.D. was announced as one of BBC's 'Introducing Artists' of 2019.

== Discography ==
=== Album ===
Title	Album details
It's Not About the Witches	Released: 17 June 2016; Label: Iamsound Records; Format: CD, digital download, vinyl

=== Extended play ===
Title	Album details
Heaven	Released: 18 November 2014; Label: Iamsound Records; Format: digital download
Same Blood	Released: 21 June 2019; Label: Tragic Fashion; Format: digital download

=== Singles ===
Title	Year	Album
"Lucifer's Eyes"	2014	Heaven
"Return Forever"	2016	It's Not About the Witches
"There's No Truth"	2016	It's Not About the Witches
"Master of the Species"	2016	It's Not About the Witches
"2 Young"	2016	It's Not About the Witches
"Start Again"	2019	Same Blood
"Illusions"	2019	Same Blood
"Same Blood"	2019	Same Blood
"Sunflower" (featuring Bag Raiders)	2019	Same Blood
