= French Horn Rebellion =

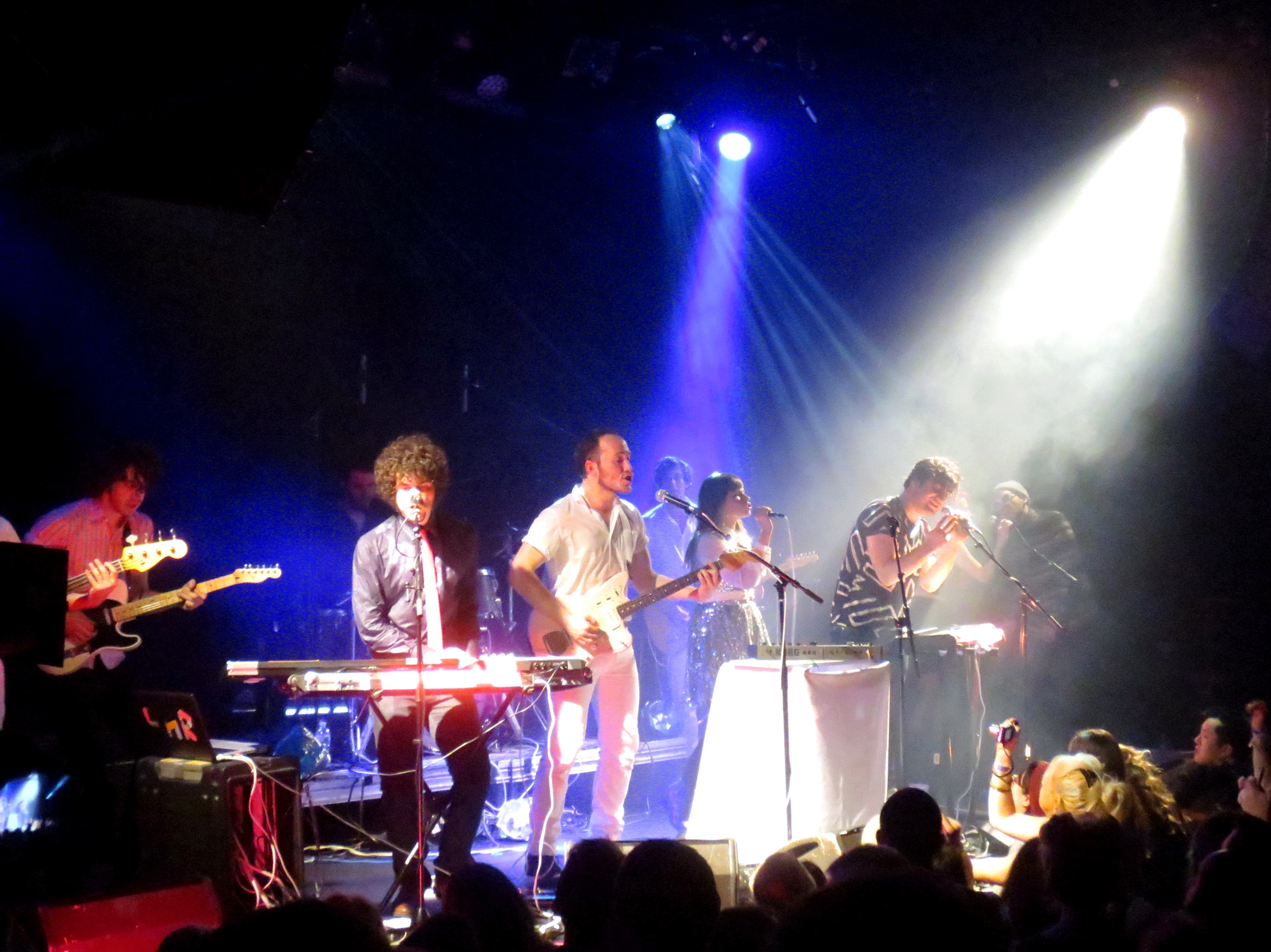
French Horn Rebellion and Savoir Adore

French Horn Rebellion is a Brooklyn electronic dance band formed in 2007 by Wisconsin-bred brothers Robert Perlick-Molinari and David Perlick Molinari. Robert Perlick-Molinari is a classically trained French horn player, who decided to start playing dance music while still attending the Bienen School of Music at Northwestern University because he did not feel like he fit into the rigid world of classical music. AllMusic lists Orchestral Manoeuvres in the Dark, the Pet Shop Boys, Gary Numan, Erasure and Depeche Mode among their influences.

The band released their debut self-titled demo in 2007, and The Infinite Music of French Horn Rebellion in 2011. Their second record, Next Jack Swing Pt. 1, was released in 2014. Their EP, Foolin' Around, was also released in 2015. David Perlick-Molinari produced and engineered MGMT's 2005 Time To Pretend EP, and over the years the band has drawn comparisons to the fellow Brooklyn band, but their most recent tracks, on Foolin' Around, are decidedly more in the throwback rock & roll vein.

The band has toured with the likes of Matt & Kim, Yelle, MGMT, Cut Copy, Two Door Cinema Club, The Knocks, The Drums, Hot Chip, of Montreal, St. Lucia, MNDR, HAERTS, Viceroy, Empire of the Sun, The B-52's, Cherub, Dillon Francis, JD Samson, Blondie, Rubblebucket, RAC, and Ghost Beach. They have also remixed artists such as Beyoncé and worked with JD Samson, Jody Watley and more.

== Albums ==
LPs

- The Infinite Music of French Horn Rebellion (2011)
- Next Jack Swing Pt. 1 (2014)
- Classically Trained (2016)
- Graduation Compilation (2019)

EPs

- Up All Night (2009)
- What I Want (2011)
- Love is Dangerous (2012)
- Dancing Out (2013)
- Swing Into It (2014)
- Foolin' Around (2015)
