= Labor (album) =

Studio album by MEN
- Released: October 22, 2013
- Genre: Electropop
- Length: 58:44
- Label: MEN Make Music

MEN chronology
Talk About Body (2011)	Labor (2013)

Singles from Labor
- 1. "All The Way Thru" Released: 20 August 2013; 2. "Making Art" Released: 17 September 2013; 3. "Club Thang" Released: 12 November 2013

Labor is the second and final album from Brooklyn electropop band MEN. It was self-released on October 22, 2013, with full album streaming made available on Bandcamp as well as the New York Times interactive website.

The album takes a subtler, more introspective approach than the band's overtly activist 2011 debut full-length, Talk About Body, although the single "Let Them Out Or Let Me In" supporting the Free Pussy Riot movement is included. After a shuffling of the band’s lineup since their debut, Samson has said she focused more on elements of transition and change for this self-released second album. By turning inward, Labor gives JD Samson & MEN greater accessibility. The reality that activist music can only go so far, this album serves to avoid restrictive genre terminology assigned to the band such as “LGBT music”.

In addition to the activist single "Let Them Out Or Let Me In", the album also contains previously released songs: all three tracks from Next EP, released in February 2012.

The band teamed up with French producer Yuksek on the single "All The Way Thru".

== Track listing ==
Labor
No.	Title	Length
1.	"Power Strobe"	4:38
2.	"All The Way Thru"	4:01
3.	"Club Thang"	4:14
4.	"Making Art"	3:16
5.	"Semenya"	4:00
6.	"(She)"	4:14
7.	"Greatest Hits"	2:29
8.	"Neon Poles"	3:25
9.	"Next"	4:28
10.	"I Don't Care"	4:28
11.	"Fucked Up"	3:39
12.	"Take It Away"	2:54
13.	"I'm Leavin'"	3:55
14.	"Let Them Out Or Let Me In"	5:33
15.	"Make Him Pay"	3:30
Total length:		58:44

== Reception ==
While not getting the same media coverage as the 2011 album Talk About Body, Labor received consistently favorable reviews.

Professional ratings
Review scores
Source	Rating
Spectrum Culture	3.75 stars on a 5 point scale
Filter	83%

== Quotes ==
Album Review
Spectrum Culture - "At first blush, it’s easy to miss MEN’s largely feminist and LGBT politics because, now on their second LP, they’ve become purveyors of throbbing and glistening club-ready electropop that’ll get your body moving before your mind can wrap around the message. It’s only upon repeat listens that the depth of Samson’s songwriting surfaces, making MEN all the more dynamic."

== Videos ==
All The Way Thru - August 15, 2013
Making Art - November 5, 2013, director: Laura Vitale
Club Thang - November 12, 2013, director: Jack Barraclough
