= Lizzy Plapinger =

English singer (born 1988)

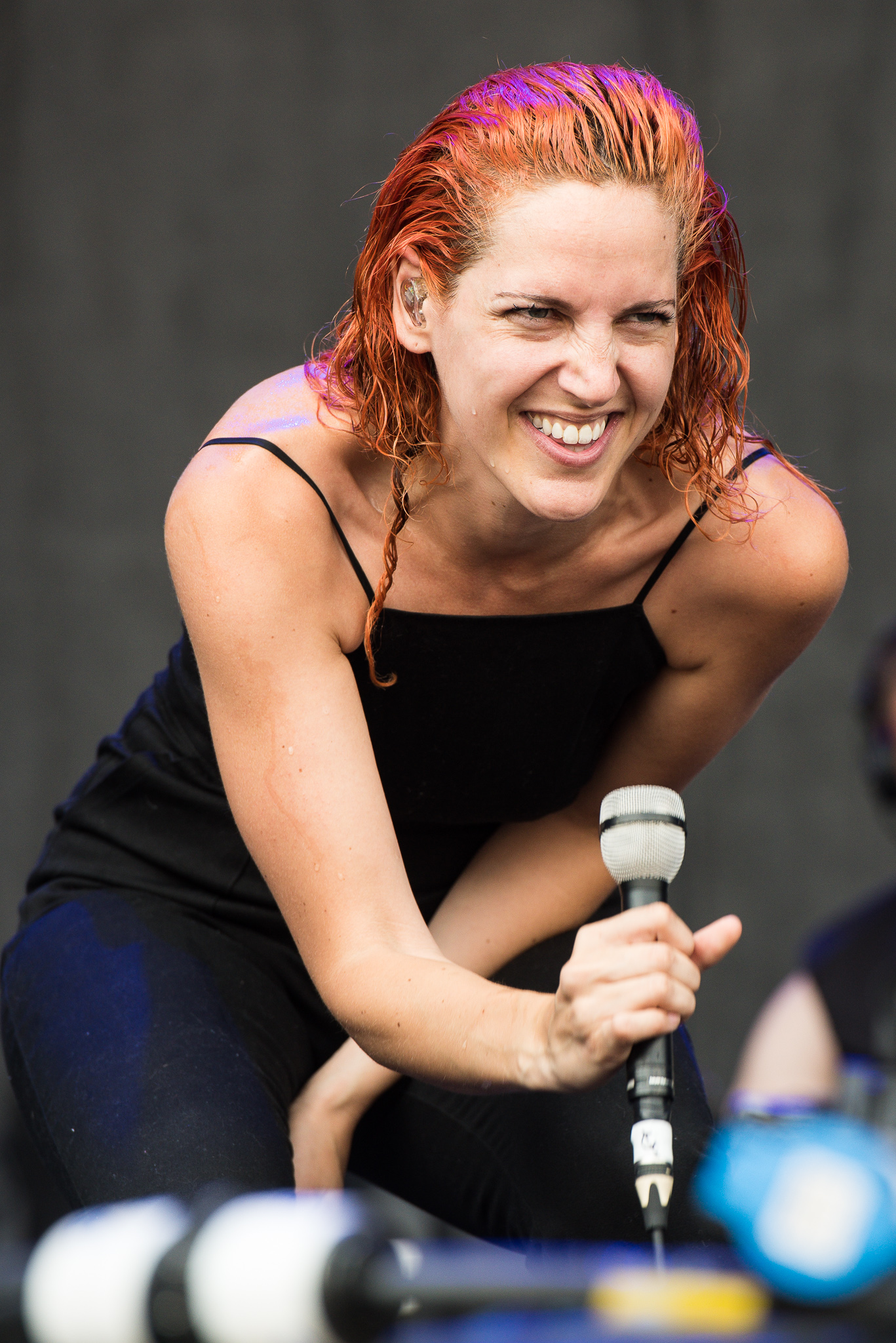
- Plapinger performing with MS MR in 2015

Background information
- Also known as: LPX
- Born: Elizabeth Plapinger; 8 May 1988 (age 38); London, England
- Origin: New York City U.S.
- Instrument: Vocals
- Years active: 2011–present
- Formerly of: MS MR
- Website: iamlpx.com

Elizabeth Plapinger, known professionally as LPX when performing as a solo artist, is an English singer who was the lead vocalist of indie pop duo MS MR and co-owner of boutique record label Neon Gold Records.

== Music career ==
Now based in New York, Plapinger comes from London. She went to Vassar College in Poughkeepsie, New York where she met MS MR partner Max Hershenow. Plapinger had played saxophone in a middle-school band and learned to play drums in college. During her sophomore year, she started the record label, Neon Gold, with Derek Davies. The label specialized in releasing limited-run, seven-inch singles and helped launch the careers of Passion Pit, Ellie Goulding, and Marina and the Diamonds. Since then, Neon Gold Records has partnered with Atlantic Records. Plapinger has worked with fashion brands including Stella McCartney, Gucci, and Marc Jacobs.

In January 2017 Plapinger released the single "Tightrope" using the name LPX. In April of the same year, the second single "Tremble" appeared, followed by the single "Slide", the following November. In January 2018, her debut EP as a solo artist, called “Bolt in the Blue”, was released.

== Discography ==
=== With MS MR ===
Albums

- Candy Bar Creep Show EP (2012)
- Secondhand Rapture (2013)
- How Does It Feel (2015)

Singles

- "Hurricane" (2012)
- "Fantasy" (2013)
- "Hurricane" (re-release) (2013)
- "Think of You" (2013)
- "Painted" (2015)
- "Criminals" (2015)
- "Wrong Victory" (2016)
- "Saturn Return" (2023)

=== As LPX ===
EPs

- Bolt in the Blue (2018)
- Junk of the Heart (2019)
- Go The Other Way, Called The Echo (2021)

Singles

- "Tightrope" (2017)
- "Tremble" (2017)
- "Slide" (2017)
- "Might Not Make it Home" (2018)
- "Give Up the Ghost" (2019)
- "Global Warming" (2019)
- "New Mood" (2020)
- "Delayed Gratification" (2020)
- "My Best" (2020)

=== Other releases ===
EPs

- "Siouxsie EP" (Mr. Dream ft. Lizzy Plapinger) (2012, Limited edition cassette-only)

Other songs

- "Sell It All" (Glass Gang ft. Lizzy Plapinger) (2013)
- "Inferno" (Sir Sly ft. Lizzy Plapinger) (2014)
- ”Better” (What So Not ft. LPX) (2017)
