= Westrin and Mowry =

American folk rock duo

Westrin & Mowry
- Origin: East Lansing, MI, U.S.
- Genres: Americana, folk rock
- Years active: 2003–present

Westrin & Mowry are an American folk rock duo formed in 2003, consisting of singer-songwriter Brian Westrin and producer/instrumentalist Peter Mowry. They have released three full-length albums as Westrin & Mowry, One Week Epiphany in 2004 and The Past Rushes In in 2014. Their third studio album, Rogues, was released in May 2016. In June 2015 the duo performed at the National Music Publishers Association annual meeting in New York City, an event which honored songwriter icon Billy Joel. Prior to releasing The Past Rushes In, Mowry was the guitarist for indie folk band Lord Huron. Westrin & Mowry released the 6-Song EP "Hooked" in 2017, and embarked on a singles-collection project in 2018, digitally releasing a new song each month.
