= Stockholm Youth Symphony Orchestra =

The Stockholm Youth Symphony Orchestra (Swedish: Stockholms ungdomssymfoniorkester) is a symphony orchestra based in Stockholm, Sweden, consisting of young musicians at a high school and college level. The orchestra was founded in 1978. It has toured many countries, including Egypt, China, Estonia, Hungary, and Portugal.

== Conductors ==
- Wille Sundling (1978–2004)
- Glenn Mossop (2005– )

== Discography ==
- Stockholms Ungdomssymfoniorkester spelar Bizet, Beethoven, Sibelius, Strauss, Hellmark (1989). Conductor Wille Sundling. Stockholms kommunala musikskola LP SKM 8901.
- Stockholms UngdomsSymfoniOrkester Live (1993). Conductor Wille Sundling, soloists Karin Mang-Habashi (soprano), Cecilia Zilliacus (violin), Nagi El Habashi (cello). Live recordings from the Stockholm Concert Hall in 1992 and 1993. SMCD 9301.
- Nordic mosaic – From Stockholm with Love (1997). Conductor Wille Sundling, soloists Åsa Wirdefeldt (violin), Martin Saving (viola), Gabriel Suovanen (barytone), Alexander Nordwall (oboe). SSKCD 9701.
