= Candy Bar Creep Show =

EP by MS MR
- Released: September 14, 2012
- Genre: Indie pop; alternative rock
- Length: 14:02
- Label: Iamsound; Creep City
- Producer: Max Hershenow

MS MR chronology
Ghost City USA (2011)	Candy Bar Creep Show (2012)	Secondhand Rapture (2013)

Professional ratings
Review scores
Source	Rating
Pitchfork	7.5/10

Candy Bar Creep Show is the debut extended play (EP) by American alternative rock band MS MR. It was released on vinyl and digital download formats by IAMSOUND Records on September 14, 2012. In Germany, the EP was issued as a CD under the name Hurricane – (the) Candy Bar Creep Show on January 18, 2013. The German maxi CD version of their single "Hurricane" had reached No. 38 in the charts there. The EP contains four tracks later included on the band's full-length debut album Secondhand Rapture, which was released on May 14, 2013. "Bones" was used in a promotional trailer for the third season of Game of Thrones in early 2013, a commercial for the real-life crime series Cold Justice and an episode of Pretty Little Liars.

== Track listing ==
All tracks were written by Lizzy Plapinger and Max Hershenow.

1. "Bones" – 4:15
2. "Hurricane" – 3:47
3. "Dark Doo Wop" – 2:53
4. "Ash Tree Lane" – 3:13

== Personnel ==
MS MR

- Lizzy Plapinger – vocals
- Max Hershenow – drums, production
