= How Does It Feel (album) =

Studio album by MS MR
- Released: July 17, 2015
- Genre: Indie pop; alternative rock
- Length: 43:37
- Label: Columbia
- Producer: Max Hershenow; Zachary Nicita

MS MR chronology
Secondhand Rapture (2013)	How Does It Feel (2015)

Singles from How Does It Feel
- 1. "Painted" Released: 2015; 2. "Criminals" Released: 2015

Professional ratings
Aggregate scores
Source	Rating
AnyDecentMusic?	5.7/10
Metacritic	62/100
Review scores
Source	Rating
AllMusic	3.5/5 stars
The A.V. Club	B−
Consequence of Sound	C
Evening Standard	4/5 stars
NME	7/10
The Observer	2/5 stars
Pitchfork	6.0/10
Under the Radar	5/10

How Does It Feel is the second and final studio album by American indie pop duo MS MR, released July 17, 2015, on Columbia Records. It includes the singles "Painted" and "Criminals".

== Track listing ==
How Does It Feel track listing
No.	Title	Writer(s)	Length
1.	"Painted"	Max Hershenow; Lizzy Plapinger	3:45
2.	"Criminals"	Hershenow; Plapinger; Zachary Nicita; Jeremiah Raisen; Justin Raisen	3:18
3.	"No Guilt in Pleasure"	Hershenow; Plapinger; Nicita	3:50
4.	"Wrong Victory"	Hershenow; Plapinger; Nicita	3:24
5.	"Tripolar"	Hershenow; Plapinger; Nicita; Amanda Warner	3:40
6.	"How Does It Feel"	Hershenow; Plapinger; Nicita	3:53
7.	"Tunnels"	Hershenow; Plapinger; Nicita	3:24
8.	"Leave Me Alone"	Hershenow; Plapinger	4:18
9.	"Reckless"	Hershenow; Plapinger; Nicita	3:50
10.	"Cruel"	Hershenow; Plapinger; Nicita	3:26
11.	"Pieces"	Hershenow; Plapinger; Tove Lo	3:34
12.	"All the Things Lost"	Hershenow; Plapinger	3:14

== Charts ==
Chart performance for How Does It Feel
Chart (2015)	Peak position
Australian Albums (ARIA)	12
Belgian Albums (Ultratop Flanders)	129
Belgian Albums (Ultratop Wallonia)	131
German Albums (Offizielle Top 100)	61
Swiss Albums (Schweizer Hitparade)	51
UK Albums (OCC)	122
US Billboard 200	141
US Top Alternative Albums (Billboard)	12
US Top Rock Albums (Billboard)	16
