= Talk About Body =

Studio album by MEN
- Released: February 1, 2011
- Genres: Electropop, Political music
- Length: 52:18
- Labels: IAMSOUND in the US; Sony/Columbia in Europe

MEN chronology
Talk About Body (2011)	Labor (2013)

Singles from Talk About Body
- 1. "Credit Card Babies" Released: 6 September 2010 (on Trouble); 2. "Off Our Backs" Released: 9 November 2010; 3. "Who Am I To Feel So Free (single version/Antony version)" Released: 14 February 2011

Professional ratings
Review scores
Source	Rating
BBC (favorable); Drowned in Sound	7/10 stars

Talk About Body is the debut album from Brooklyn electropop band MEN. It was released on February 1, 2011 on IAMSOUND Records in the US, and Sony/Columbia in Europe. It received a favorable average score of 64 on Metacritic.
The song lyrics contain a diverse range of social and political messages. In her interview with MEN for L.A. Music Blog, Kristyn Scorsone described the album as "a dance revolution that is lyrically provocative. Both smart and political, the album talks about not only body, but gay baby makin’, government profiteering in regards to war, feminism, gender politics, and simply how it feels to be getting too old for the club scene."

== Track listing ==
Talk About Body
No.	Title	Length
1.	"Life's Half Price"	5:26
2.	"Off Our Backs"	4:40
3.	"Credit Card Babies"	3:51
4.	"Boom Boom Boom"	4:06
5.	"Take Your Shirt Off"	4:23
6.	"Who Am I To Feel So Free"	3:19
7.	"Make It Reverse"	3:20
8.	"Simultaneously"	6:29
9.	"If You Want Something"	4:35
10.	"Rip Off"	4:14
11.	"My Family"	3:30
12.	"Be Like This"	5:19
Total length:		52:18

== Quotes ==
Album Review
The Guardian - "MEN's debut is one of the best of the year. Or, at least, the best of the niche area where gender politics and dance music intersect. "

== Videos ==
Off Our Backs - November 4, 2010, director: Bryce Kass
Who Am I To Feel So Free - February 14, 2011
