= Bleeding Knees Club =

Australian rock band

Bleeding Knees Club is a rock band from the Gold Coast, Australia, founded by Alex Wall (vocals/drums/Guitar), and Jordan Malane (guitar/Bass).

== Origins ==
The band was formed as a duo in March 2010 by friends Alex Wall and Jordan Malane. Their first live show was at a local warehouse party. They gained popularity after being played on the Australian national radio broadcaster Triple J.

== Career ==
In 2011 after releasing their debut EP, "Virginity" they were named in NME's 50 Best New Bands and in Triple J's Next Crop of Artists. Bleeding Knees Club went to New York to record their first album, "Nothing To Do," with American producer and artist Dev Hynes, which was released on 27 February 2012. On April 14, 2017, the band released the EP, "Chew the Gum".

Bleeding Knees Club are currently signed with Iamsound Records.

== Discography ==
=== EPs ===
- Virginity (2011)
- Chew the Gum (2017)

=== Albums ===
- Nothing to Do (2012)
- Fade the Hammer (2018)

== Band members ==
Current members

- Alex Wall – vocals (2010–present), drums (2010–2012), guitar (2012–present)
- Michael Barker – guitar, vocals (2016–present)
- Gio Alexander – bass, vocals (2016–present)
- Nick Leighton – drums (2016–present)

Former members

- Jordan Malane – guitar (2010–2012), bass (2012-2015)
- Matt Woods – drums (2011)
- Brett Jansch – bass (2012-2013)
- Joel Abbot – drums (2013)
