= MS MR =

American pop rock duo (2011–2023)

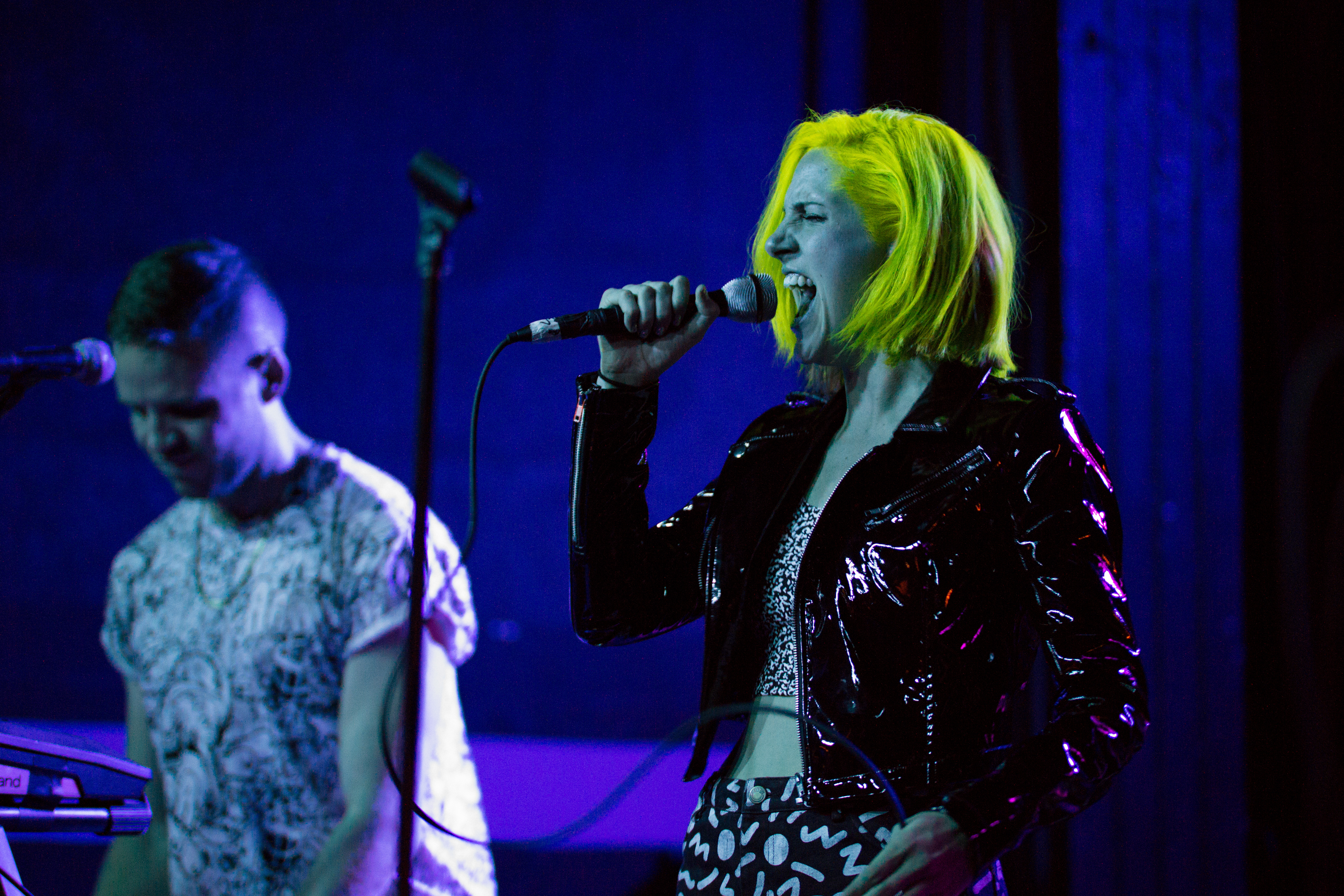
- MS MR at Austin City Limits in 2013

Background information
- Origin: New York City, New York, United States
- Genres: Dream pop; dark wave; alternative rock
- Years active: 2011–2023
- Labels: Iamsound; Columbia; Kitsuné
- Past members: Lizzy Plapinger (MS); Max Hershenow (MR)
- Website: msmrsounds.com

MS MR (pronounced Miz Mister) was a New York-based American pop duo, consisting of vocalist Lizzy Plapinger and producer Max Hershenow. The duo were signed to Iamsound, Kitsuné and Columbia Records. Plapinger is also known for her work as co-founder of the New York City/London-based Independent record label Neon Gold Records. Their music has been characterized as indie pop, alternative rock, dream pop and dark wave.

== Career ==
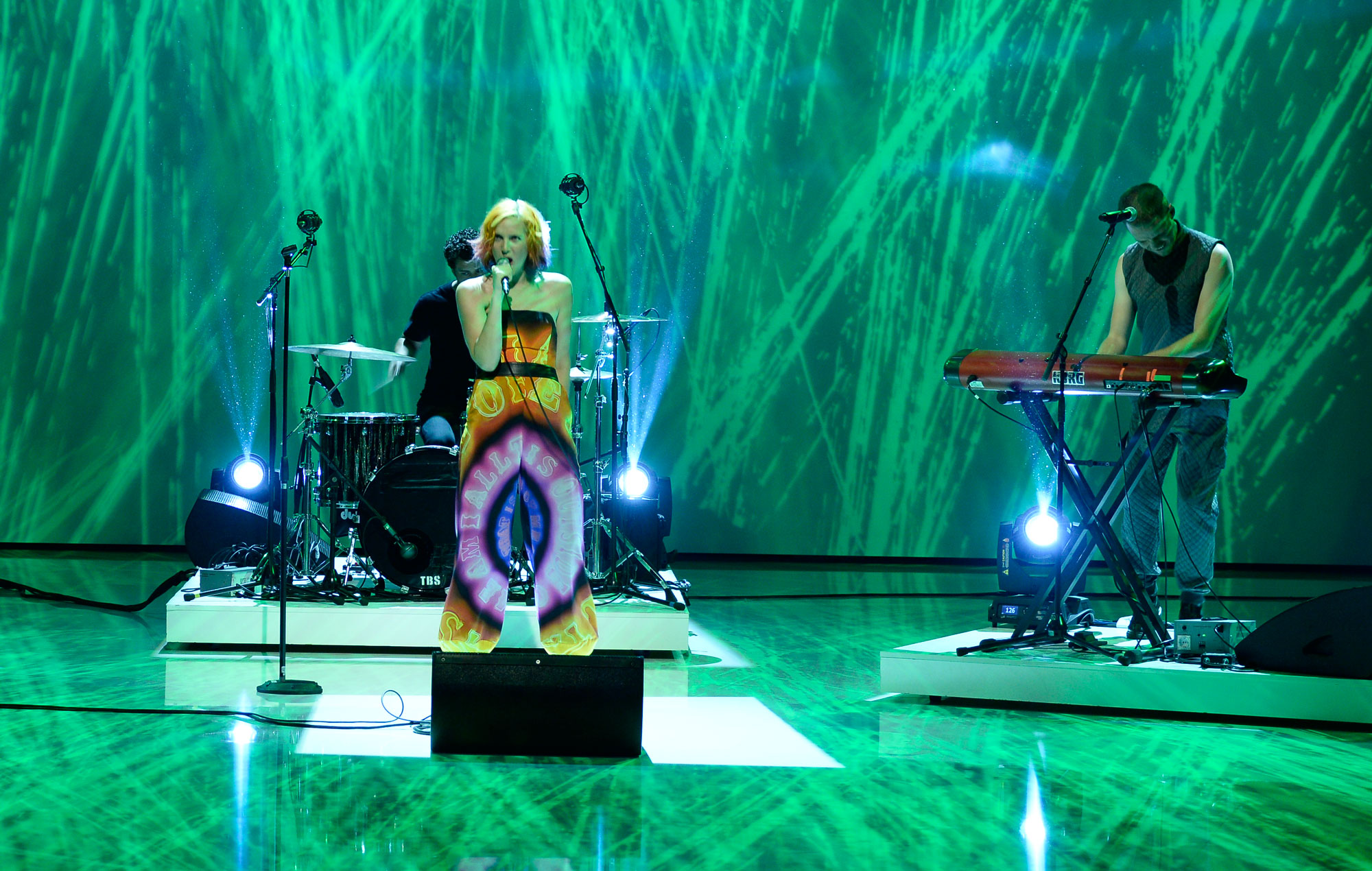
MS MR performing at Michalsky StyleNite of Berlin Fashion Week in August 2013

After both members graduated from Vassar College in 2010, MS MR released a four-song digital demo EP, Ghost City USA (2011), followed by two 2012 singles, "Hurricane" and "Fantasy". The music video for their debut single, "Hurricane", was released on April 26, 2012, with the single released on iTunes on July 10, 2012. It earned positive reviews for its "vintage" sound. The single charted at number 38 in Germany.

"Hurricane" was included on their debut EP, Candy Bar Creep Show, alongside the songs "Bones", "Dark Doo Wop" and "Ash Tree Lane". The EP was released on September 14, 2012.

The music video for their second single, "Fantasy", was released on February 4, 2013. The song was later released on iTunes on March 8, 2013 and became a single of the week.

Their debut album, Secondhand Rapture, was released on May 10, 2013, and included all four songs from the prior EP.

On July 17, 2015 they released their second album, How Does It Feel. After touring for much of 2016, the band announced a hiatus in January 2017 while Plapinger focused on her solo project, LPX. On 7th August, 2023, they announced via social media that a new single, called "Saturn Return", would be available to listen to on 6th September. Additionally, it was announced that this would be the last single the duo would make as MS MR.

MS MR's sound has been compared to Florence and the Machine, Lana Del Rey and Kavinsky. Despite growing up in London, Plapinger has an American accent because her parents are American and she attended an international school.

== Discography ==
- Secondhand Rapture (2013)
- How Does It Feel (2015)
