= Lord Huron =

American indie folk band

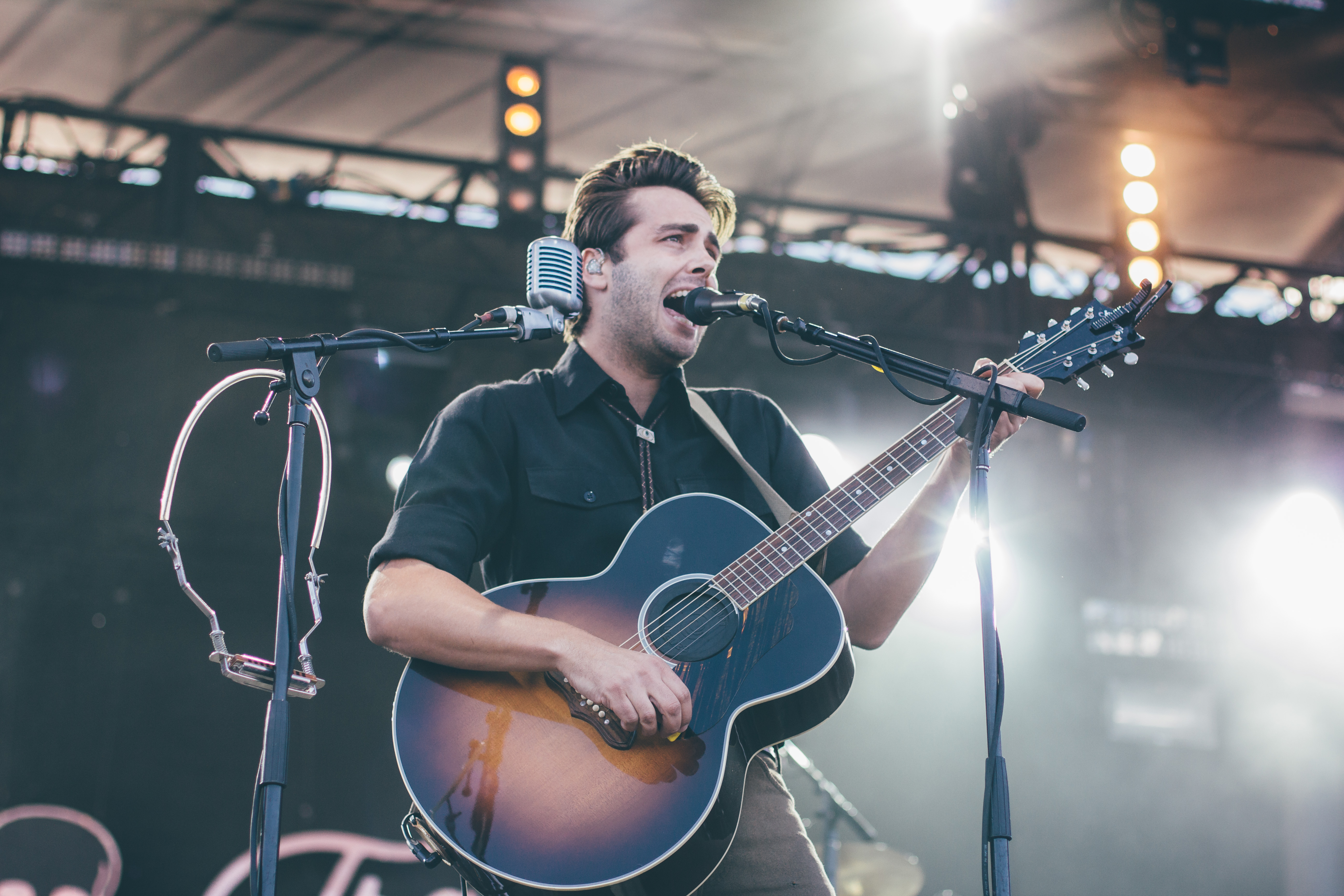
- Lord Huron performing at Loufest 2015 (Ben Schneider pictured)

Background information
- Origin: Los Angeles, California, U.S.
- Genres: Indie folk; indie rock; psychedelic rock
- Years active: 2010–present
- Labels: Republic; Iamsound; Play It Again Sam
- Members: Ben Schneider; Mark Barry; Miguel Briseño; Tom Renaud; Misty Boyce
- Past members: Brett Farkas; Peter Mowry; Karl Kerfoot; Anne Williamson
- Website: www.lordhuron.com

Lord Huron is a Los Angeles-based American indie rock band composed of Mark Barry (drums, percussion), Miguel Briseño (bass, keyboard, theremin), Tom Renaud (guitar), and founder Ben Schneider (guitar, lead vocals). They released their debut album Lonesome Dreams in 2012, their second album Strange Trails in 2015, their third album Vide Noir in 2018, their fourth album Long Lost in 2021, and their fifth album The Cosmic Selector, Vol. 1 in 2025.

Lord Huron combines country, western, folk rock, rock and roll, pop melodies, and surf rock with soundtrack and new age influences to produce a sound The Wall Street Journal described as having "a decidedly cinematic flair, heavy on mood and evocative imagery. Lord Huron brings to mind the high-lonesome sound of antecedents like the Band, Neil Young, My Morning Jacket and Fleet Foxes".

== History ==
=== Formation (2010–2011) ===
Schneider began writing music in his hometown of Okemos, Michigan before studying visual arts at the University of Michigan and in France then moving to New York City where he worked as an artist. After relocating to Los Angeles, in 2010 Schneider formed Lord Huron as a solo project, recording a few EPs on his own and enlisting musicians to play in live shows. The band's name was inspired by Lake Huron, which Schneider grew up visiting.

=== Lonesome Dreams (2012–2013) ===
Lord Huron's first full-length album, Lonesome Dreams, was released on October 9, 2012. It debuted at No. 5 on Billboard's Heatseekers Albums chart.

With the release of Lonesome Dreams, the band released a series of music videos filmed in a western '70s style, which Schneider says was the focal point and narrative for the album. "We had this fun idea that Lonesome Dreams was kind of this series of old adventure tales." In an interview, Schneider alluded to influence from a specific work, called The Collected Works of Billy the Kid: Left-Handed Poems. "It's sort of a collection of pulp fiction and we wanted the videos to kind of reflect that and have that same feel and style", Schneider said during another interview. They also decided to release a theatrical version of the videos.

=== Strange Trails (2014–2017) ===
The band released their second album, Strange Trails, on April 6, 2015 in the UK and April 7, 2015 in the US. The album debuted on the Billboard 200 at No. 23, Folk Albums at No. 1, and No. 10 on the Top Album Sales chart with 18,000 copies sold.

On June 2, 2015, the song "Ends of the Earth" from Lonesome Dreams was featured in "Emotional Consequences of Broadcast Television", the series finale of the sitcom Community.

The song "The Night We Met" was RIAA certified gold on June 26, 2017 and certified platinum on February 15, 2018. The song was used in the series 13 Reasons Why, in Season 1. It was later remixed in 2018 to feature Phoebe Bridgers for Season 2.

=== Vide Noir (2018–2020) ===
In January 2018, several short videos with audio clips on Lord Huron's Facebook, Instagram, and Twitter accounts led to speculation of an album release. The band's third album, Vide Noir, was announced to be released on April 20, 2018.

On January 26, 2018, Lord Huron released their first single from the album, a two-part song called "Ancient Names". On February 16, 2018, the band released the next single, "Wait by the River". On March 7, 2018 they performed the song on Jimmy Kimmel Live!

Lord Huron performed an extended preview of Vide Noir on March 8, 2018, at Teragram Ballroom in Los Angeles. They debuted five songs off the new album: "Ancient Names (Part I)", "Ancient Names (Part II)", "Wait by the River", "Never Ever", and "Vide Noir". On March 27, 2018, they performed another preview set at Le Poisson Rouge in New York. They played the same five new songs as at Teragram Ballroom plus two more songs from the yet-to-be-released album, "When the Night Is Over" and "Back from the Edge".

On the day of the album release, April 20, 2018, Lord Huron played a release show in Grand Rapids in Schneider's home state of Michigan.

On July 11, 2018, Lord Huron recorded two Spotify Singles, "When the Night Is Over" and a cover of Neil Young's "Harvest Moon", at Spotify Studios.

On August 11, 2018, the band performed a medley of "Never Ever", "When the Night Is Over", and "Moonbeam" from Vide Noir on the CBS This Morning: Saturday Sessions.

=== Long Lost (2021–2024) ===
In December 2020, the band announced a collection of live-streamed shows entitled Alive from Whispering Pines. The first episode aired on January 7, 2021, and featured a clip of previously unreleased material. On February 19, 2021, a day after the second episode of Alive from Whispering Pines, the band released a new single, "Not Dead Yet".

On March 18, 2021, the third episode of Alive from Whispering Pines concluded with the supposed title of their upcoming fourth studio album, Long Lost, as well as an expected release date of May 21, 2021. This was confirmed when the album became available for pre-order on iTunes, Amazon, and other music vendors. On March 19, 2021, the "Mine Forever" single was released, which had been previewed in the second episode of Alive from Whispering Pines. On April 30, 2021, another single from Long Lost was released, "I Lied", featuring American singer-songwriter August Ponthier.

The album was released on the band's Whispering Pines label on May 21, 2021 to "universal acclaim". In 2022, the band toured Canada with Leith Ross. The band has opened for Kacey Musgraves on her Deeper Well World Tour in the US and Canada.

=== The Cosmic Selector Vol. 1 (2025–present) ===
In January 2025, Lord Huron released the single "Who Laughs Last", featuring spoken word verses from actress Kristen Stewart. This was followed by the release of three more singles: “Nothing I Need” in March, “Looking Back” in May, and “Bag of Bones” in June. This culminated in the release of their fifth album, The Cosmic Selector Vol. 1, on July 18th, 2025. The band performed "Bag of Bones" on Jimmy Kimmel Live on November 20, 2025.

Schneider said in a 2025 interview with Americana UK that aging was a major inspiration for the album. "I’m getting to that age where I’m starting to think about my life and realising [sic], I don’t have unlimited time [...] as you get older, you just realise that there’s certain doors that close over the course of a life that can never be opened again. And that’s kind of what the record’s about – choosing your path, your fate, and how it’s never quite what you imagined."

In the same interview, Schneider said that a Cosmic Selector Vol. 2 is a possibility but not currently in progress.

== Band members ==
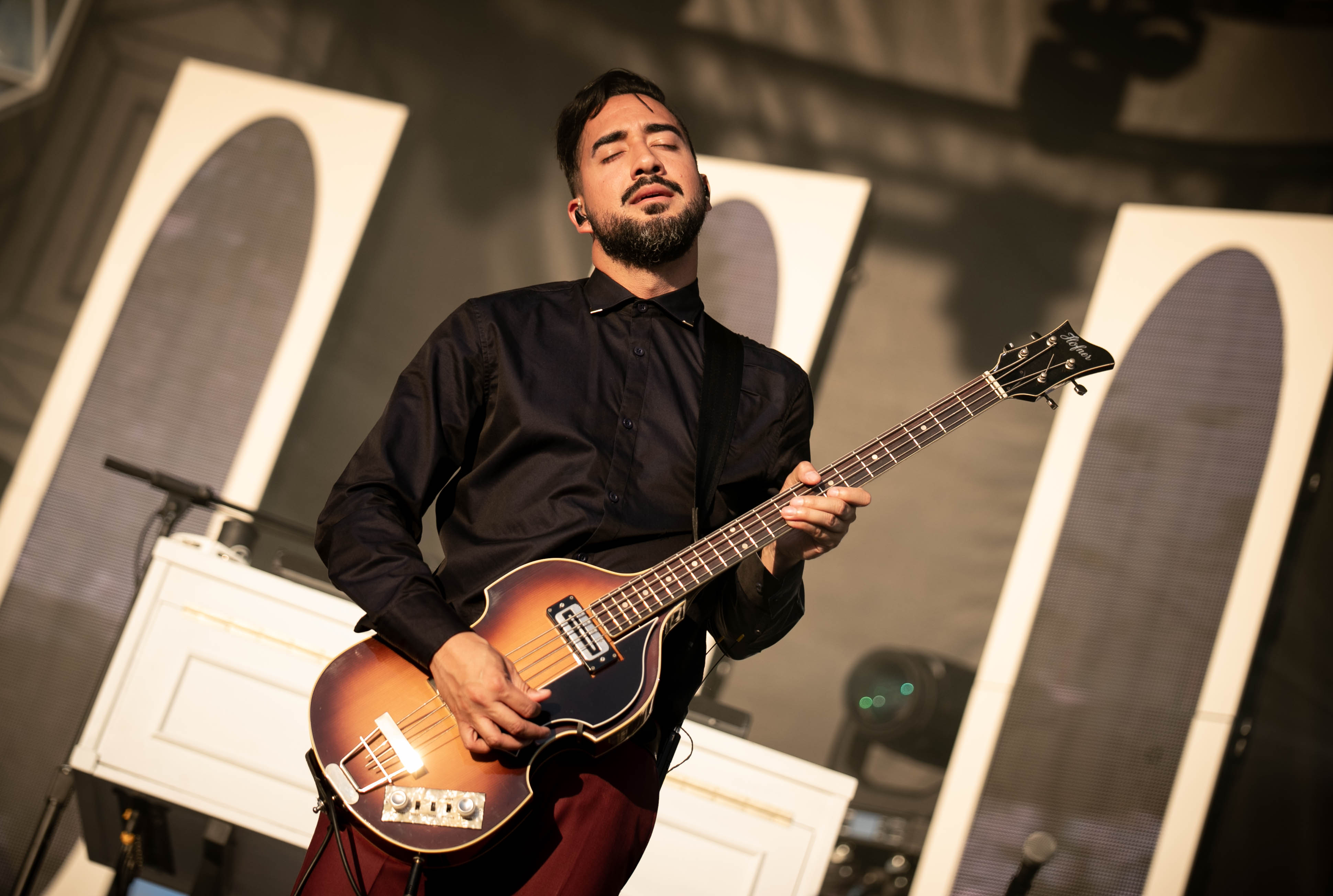
Miguel Briseño

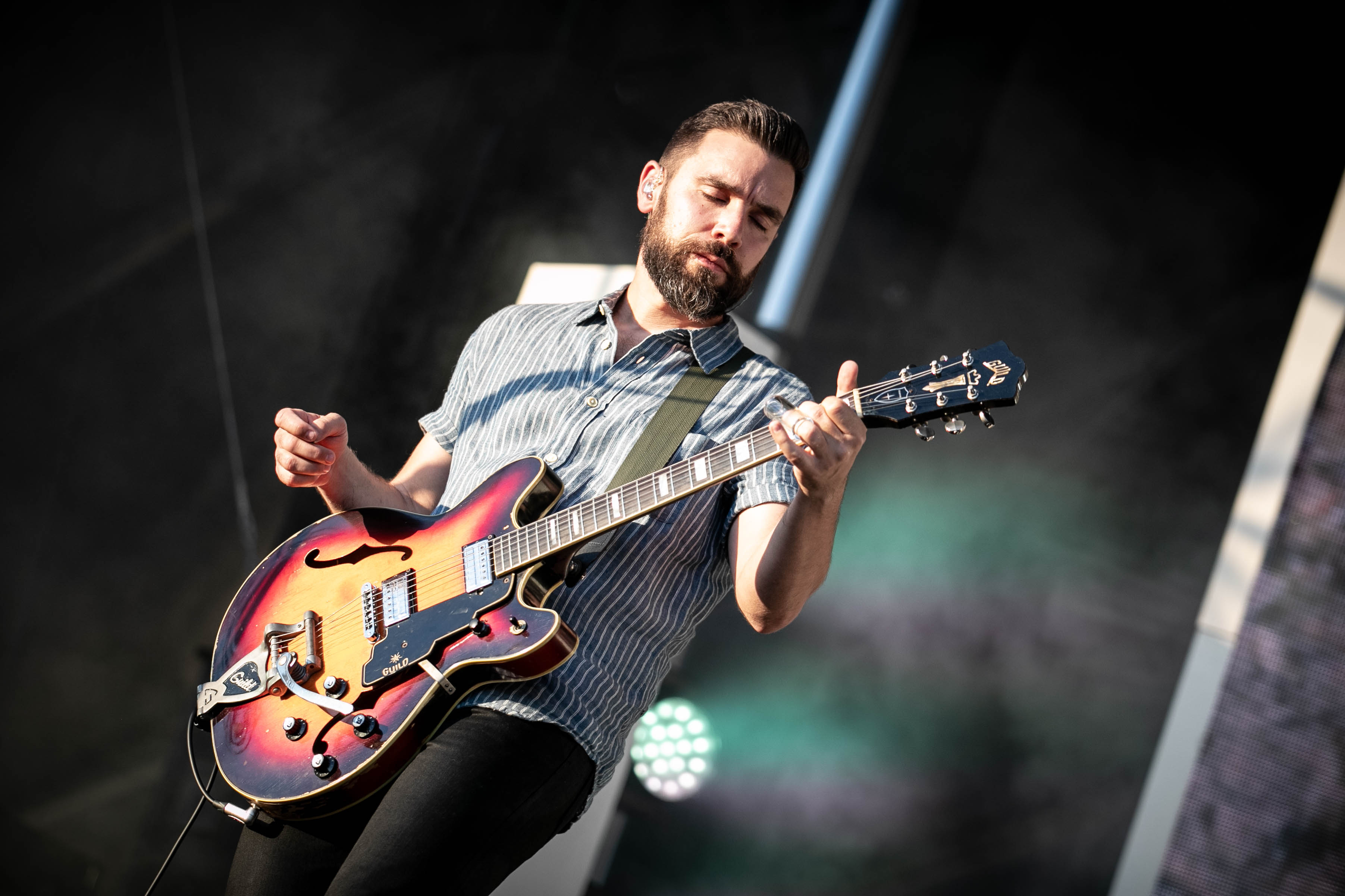
Tom Renaud

Current

- Ben Schneider – guitar, vocals, harmonica
- Mark Barry – drums, percussion, vocals
- Miguel Briseño – bass, keyboards, percussion, theremin
- Tom Renaud – guitar, vocals

Touring

- Brandon Walters – guitar, vocals
- Misty Boyce – keyboards, vocals
- Waylon Rector – guitar, vocals

Former

- Peter Mowry – guitar
- Brett Farkas – guitar, vocals
- Karl Kerfoot – guitar, vocals
- Anne Williamson – keys, vocals

== Discography ==
=== Albums ===
Title	Album details	Chart positions										Sales	Certifications
Title	Album details	US	US Folk	AUS Hit.	BEL	CAN	IRL	NLD	SCO	SWI	UK	Sales	Certifications
Lonesome Dreams	Released: October 9, 2012; Label: Iamsound; Format: Digital download, CD, vinyl	179	—	—	64	—	97	— (Note: Lonesome Dreams did not enter the Dutch Album Top 100, but entered the Dutch Alternative Top 30 chart at number 19.)	—	—	— (Note: Lonesome Dreams did not enter the UK Albums Chart, but peaked at number 20 on the UK Record Store Chart.)		
Strange Trails	Released: April 7, 2015; Label: Iamsound; Format: Digital download, CD, vinyl	23	1	9	108	16	70	87	77	—	95		RIAA: Platinum; RMNZ: Platinum
Vide Noir	Release date: April 20, 2018; Label: Republic; Format: Digital download, CD, vinyl	9	1	19	134	40	—	—	70	—	— (Note: Vide Noir did not enter the UK Albums Chart, but peaked at number 63 on the UK Album Downloads Chart.)	US: 28,000	
Long Lost	Release date: May 21, 2021; Label: Republic; Format: Digital download, CD, vinyl, cassette	23	1	—	—	—	—	—	77	77	— (Note: Long Lost did not enter the UK Albums Chart, but peaked at number 61 on the UK Album Downloads Chart.)		
The Cosmic Selector Vol. 1	Release date: July 18, 2025; Label: Mercury; Format: Digital download, CD, vinyl, cassette	23	2	—	—	—	—	—	37	—	— (Note: The Cosmic Selector Vol. 1 did not enter the UK Albums Chart, but peaked at number 37 on the UK Album Sales Chart.)		
"—" denotes a recording that did not chart or was not released in that territory.

=== Extended plays ===
- Into the Sun (self-released, 2010)
- Mighty (Linian Music, 2010)
- Time to Run (Iamsound, 2012)

=== Singles ===
Title	Year	Peak chart positions										Certifications	Album
Title	Year	US	US Rock	AUS	BEL	CAN	IRL	POR	SWI	UK	WW	Certifications	Album
"The World Ender"	2015	—	— (Note: "The World Ender" did not enter the Billboard Hot Rock & Alternative Songs chart, but peaked at number 28 on the Triple A Airplay chart.)	—	—	—	—	—	—	—	—		Strange Trails
"Fool for Love"	2015	—	40	—	— (Note: "Fool for Love" did not enter the Flanders Ultratop 50, but peaked at number 81 on the Ultratip chart.)	—	—	—	—	—	—		Strange Trails
"The Night We Met"	2017	84	5	78	44	58	17	50	10	75	37	RIAA: 11× Platinum; BEA: Gold; BPI: 3× Platinum; RMNZ: 8× Platinum	Strange Trails
"Ancient Names (Part I)"	2018	—	45	—	—	—	—	—	—	—	—		Vide Noir
"Wait by the River"	2018	—	47	—	—	—	—	—	—	—	—		Vide Noir
"Never Ever"	2018	—	— (Note: "Never Ever" did not enter the Billboard Hot Rock & Alternative Songs chart, but peaked at number 26 on the Triple A Airplay chart.)	—	—	—	—	—	—	—	—		Vide Noir
"The Night We Met" (featuring Phoebe Bridgers)	2018	—	25	— (Note: "The Night We Met" featuring Phoebe Bridgers did not enter the Australian ARIA Singles Chart but peaked at number 45 on the ARIA Digital Track Chart.)	—	—	—	59	— (Note: "The Night We Met" (featuring Phoebe Bridgers) did not enter the Swiss Singles chart, but charted at number 27 on the Swiss Streaming chart.)	— (Note: "The Night We Met" (featuring Phoebe Bridgers) did not enter the UK Singles Chart, but peaked at number 91 on the UK Singles Downloads Chart.)	—	AFP: 3× Platinum	13 Reasons Why (Season 2): A Netflix Original Series Soundtrack
"Setting Sun"	2020	—	—	—	—	—	—	—	—	—	—		Lonesome Dreams
"Not Dead Yet"	2021	—	— (Note: "Not Dead Yet" did not enter the Billboard Hot Rock & Alternative Songs chart, but peaked at number 28 on the Rock & Alternative Airplay chart.)	—	—	—	—	—	—	—	—		Long Lost
"Mine Forever"	2021	—	— (Note: "Mine Forever" did not enter the Billboard Hot Rock & Alternative Songs chart, but peaked at number 45 on the Rock & Alternative Airplay chart.)	—	—	—	—	—	—	—	—		Long Lost
"Long Lost"	2021	—	—	—	—	—	—	—	—	—	—		Long Lost
"I Lied" (with August Ponthier)	2021	—	—	—	—	—	—	—	—	—	—		Long Lost
"Your Other Life"	2022	—	—	—	—	—	—	—	—	—	—		Long Lost
"Ace Up My Sleeve"	2023	—	—	—	—	—	—	—	—	—	—		Music for The Starling Girl
"Who Laughs Last?" (featuring Kristen Stewart)	2025	—	—	—	—	—	—	—	—	—	—		The Cosmic Selector Vol. 1
"Nothing I Need"	2025	—	— (Note: "Nothing I Need" did not enter the Billboard Hot Rock & Alternative Songs chart, but peaked at number 18 on the Rock & Alternative Airplay chart.)	—	—	—	—	—	—	—	—		The Cosmic Selector Vol. 1
"Watch Me Go"	2025	—	— (Note: "Watch Me Go" did not enter the Billboard Hot Rock & Alternative Songs chart, but peaked at number 39 on the Rock & Alternative Airplay chart.)	—	—	—	—	—	—	—	—		The Cosmic Selector Vol. 1
"—" denotes releases that did not chart or were not released in that country.

=== Other certified songs ===
Title	Certifications	Album
"Ends of the Earth"	RIAA: Gold; RMNZ: Gold	Lonesome Dreams

== Awards and nominations ==
Year	Award	Category	Nominee(s)/Work(s)	Results	Ref.
2026	American Music Awards	Best Americana/Folk Artist	Lord Huron	Nominated	
