= Secondhand Rapture =

Studio album by MS MR
- Released: May 14, 2013
- Recorded: 2011–2012
- Studio: 332Gates, New York City; Media Right Productions, New York City; Electric Lady Studios, New York City
- Genre: Indie pop; alternative rock
- Length: 42:06
- Label: Columbia; Creep City
- Producer: Lizzy Plapinger; Max Hershenow; Tom Elmhirst

MS MR chronology
Candy Bar Creep Show (2012)	Secondhand Rapture (2013)	How Does It Feel (2015)

Singles from Secondhand Rapture
- 1. "Hurricane" Released: June 10, 2012; 2. "Fantasy" Released: March 8, 2013; 3. "Think of You" Released: August 5, 2013; 4. "Fantasy" / "Dance Yrself Clean" Released: November 7, 2013

Secondhand Rapture is the debut studio album by American duo MS MR, released on May 14, 2013 by Columbia Records. The album was written and produced by MS MR with additional production and mixing done by Tom Elmhirst. The album features the singles "Hurricane", "Fantasy" and "Think of You". Secondhand Rapture peaked at number 116 on the Billboard 200 and sold 3,500 copies during its first week. To promote the record, the band toured across North America.

== Singles ==
- "Hurricane" was released as the first European single. The song was popular in Germany and made it to number 38 on that country's singles chart. In April 2013, "Hurricane" was re-released as the second international single from the album.
- "Fantasy" was released as the official lead single from the album. The music video was released on February 4, 2013. The single reached number 77 on Australia's ARIA Charts.
- "Think of You" was released as the third single. The music video was released on February 4, 2013.

== Promotion ==
On June 24, 2013, the band announced a 26-city summer-fall tour across North America to promote the record, beginning on August 3 at Chicago's House of Blues and finishing on October 23 in Vancouver. Two Door Cinema Club, MØ and Wildcat! Wildcat! were supporting acts on the tour.

== Critical reception ==
Professional ratings
Aggregate scores
Source	Rating
AnyDecentMusic?	6.4/10
Metacritic	60/100
Review scores
Source	Rating
AllMusic	3.5/5 stars
Consequence of Sound	C+
Filter	83%
The Independent	3/5 stars
MusicOMH	4/5 stars
Pitchfork	6.0/10
PopMatters	5/10
Q	3/5 stars
Slant Magazine	3.5/5 stars
Under the Radar	6/10

Secondhand Rapture garnered mixed reviews from music critics. At Metacritic, which assigns a normalized rating out of 100 to reviews from mainstream critics, the album received an average score of 60, based on 15 reviews.

Laurence Green, writing for MusicOMH, praised the album's warm production, melodies and consistency, declaring, "For all its rich fashionable stylings, Second Rapture is a pop album to its very core and wears the tag with pride". AllMusic's Heather Phares said, "MS MR concentrate on a sullen yet sultry mood for the bulk of Secondhand Rapture, and while that delivers several notable tracks -- "Fantasy" and "Head Is Not My Home" chief among them—at times it's almost too much. Still, the album's strongest tracks show that the duo has plenty of talent and potential". " Sal Cinquemani of Slant Magazine praised the album, noting that "MS MR's knack for durable hooks, in fact, is what keeps the album's gloomy goth-pop anchored".

Pitchfork contributor Laura Snapes described the band's sound as "brooding, rhythmically strong pop songs that fall halfway between the poutiness of Lana Del Rey and the hyperactive fizz of Haim", but criticized their "obsessively curated" strategy", inconsistent lyrical approach and deviations from their sonic template of "deep, thunderous rumblings, celestial twinkling, foggy shrouds, and the sweet clarity of a pastel dawn". Sasha Geffen of Consequence of Sound commended Plapinger's nuanced lyrical delivery and Hershenow's "rich orchestral palette", concluding that "Secondhand Rapture blurs the line between throwing up our hands in defeat and throwing them up in joy".

== In popular culture ==
"Bones" was used in a promotional trailer for the third season of Game of Thrones in early 2013, and in the "What Becomes of the Broken-Hearted" episode of Pretty Little Liars, which aired February 12, 2013. "Hurricane" was featured in the 2018 film Extinction.

== Track listing ==
All tracks are written by MS MR, additional production by Tom Elmhirst.

No.	Title	Length
1.	"Hurricane"	3:46
2.	"Bones"	4:15
3.	"Ash Tree Lane"	3:13
4.	"Fantasy"	3:28
5.	"Dark Doo Wop"	2:53
6.	"Head Is Not My Home"	3:33
7.	"Salty Sweet"	3:12
8.	"Think of You"	3:26
9.	"Twenty Seven"	3:39
10.	"BTSK"	3:27
11.	"No Trace"	3:16
12.	"This Isn't Control"	3:58
Total length:		42:06

Amazon exclusive version (MP3 download)
No.	Title	Length
13.	"Fantasy" (Nicita Remix)	3:39

iTunes bonus track
No.	Title	Length
13.	"Fantasy" (Kele from Bloc Party Remix)	5:56

Spotify bonus track
No.	Title	Length
13.	"Strings"	3:57

Secondhand^2: The Remix EP
No.	Title	Length
1.	"Think of You" (Wet Remix)	3:45
2.	"Think of You" (Haerts Remix)	5:36
3.	"Hurricane" (Goldroom Remix)	5:44
4.	"Fantasy" (Nicita Remix)	3:40
5.	"Fantasy" (Xaphoon Jones Late Nite Mix)	3:35
6.	"Bones" (Hot Sugar Remix)	3:56
Total length:		26:16

== Personnel ==
Credits adapted from the Secondhand Rapture booklet.

MS MR

- Lizzy Plapinger (MS)
- Max Hershenow (MR)

Additional musicians

- Curtis Nystrom – autoharp (1, 12), guitars and lap steel (2), bass (6)
- Zach Nicita – drums (2, 3, 4, 6, 11), additional drum programming (12)
- Max Hershenow – background vocals (4, 7)

Production

- MS MR – producer
- Chris Camilleri – additional pre-production, original mix (1–11)
- Tom Elmhirst – additional production (1–9, 11), mixing
- Graig Janssen – engineering (1–3, 6)
- Peter Bischoff – engineering (2–9, 11)
- Ben Baptie – assistant mixing (Metropolis Studios)
- Tom Coyne – mastering (Sterling Sound)

Imagery

- MS MR – art direction, design
- Anita Marisa Boriboon – art direction, design
- Tyler Kohloff – photography
- Lana Lackey – styling
- Laura Stiassini – hair and make-up
- Carmen Maria Traud – illustration

== Charts ==
Chart performance for Secondhand Rapture
Chart (2013)	Peak position
Australian Albums (ARIA)	22
Belgian Albums (Ultratop Flanders)	126
German Albums (Offizielle Top 100)	36
Swiss Albums (Schweizer Hitparade)	51
UK Albums (OCC)	65
US Billboard 200	116
US Top Alternative Albums (Billboard)	24
US Top Rock Albums (Billboard)	35

== Release history ==
Release history for Secondhand Rapture
Region	Date	Label	Format(s)	Name
Germany	May 10, 2013	Columbia, Sony Music	CD, digital download, vinyl	Secondhand Rapture
France	May 10, 2013	Columbia, Sony Music	Digital download	Secondhand Rapture
United Kingdom	May 10, 2013	Columbia, Sony Music	Digital download	Secondhand Rapture
France	May 13, 2013	Columbia, Sony Music	CD	Secondhand Rapture
United Kingdom	May 13, 2013	Columbia, Sony Music	CD, vinyl	Secondhand Rapture
Various	May 14, 2013	Columbia, Sony Music	CD, digital download, vinyl	Secondhand Rapture
Various	April 8, 2014	Columbia, Sony Music	Digital download	Secondhand^2: The Remix EP
