= Iamsound =

American entertainment company

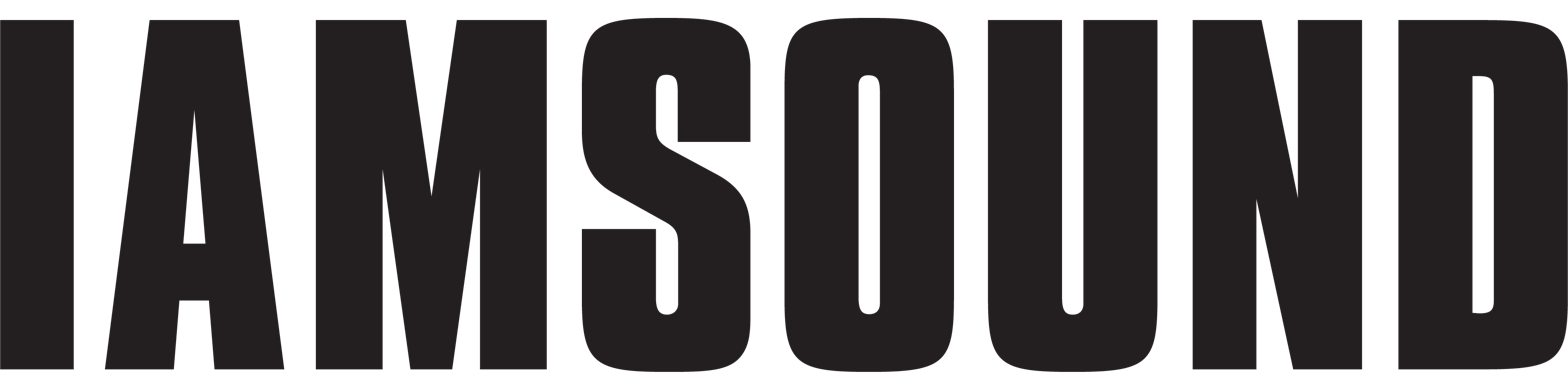
- Founded: 2007
- Headquarters: Los Angeles, California, U.S.
- Services: Record label; creative and marketing studio; visual artist management
- Owners: Niki Roberton, Paul Tao, Anh Do
- Website: iamsound.com

Iamsound (stylized IAMSOUND; formerly Iamsound Records) is an American entertainment company based in Los Angeles and founded by Niki Roberton. It has a creative and marketing studio, visual artist management firm, and an independent record label.

== Record label ==
Iamsound launched as a record label in 2007; it released albums from artists including Florence and the Machine, Charli XCX, Lord Huron, Banks, and Salem. The label also promoted the group MS MR and released its single "Hurricane", and the group's album Secondhand Rapture eventually came out via Columbia Records. It later expanded into visual artist management and running a creative studio. In 2010, Iamsound released a series of vinyl and digital singles called the L.A. Collection, featuring Los musicians in Los Angeles through a singles club. In 2019, they signed artist Mk.gee.

== Creative and marketing studio ==
In 2012, Iamsound collaborated with the Museum of Contemporary Art, Los Angeles for an event called PLAY MOCA, which showcased artists including Salem, IO Echo, Zola Jesus, Active Child, Cults, and Lord Huron. The company created a concert series titled "Artist Connect" with Pitchfork for Ford in 2014.

Iamsound's creative and marketing studio won a 2019 Clio Gold Music award for its Spotify In-House "Billie Eilish Experience" event. The company partnered with Dropbox and Getty to present "Bridge-s" at the Getty Center museum from November 16–17, 2019 for Solange.

== Discography ==
- Sunny Day Sets Fire – Brainless (2006)
- Shakes – Sister Self Doubt (2006)
- Cut Off Your Hands – Shaky Hands (2007)
- The Black Ghosts – Anyway You Choose to Give It (2007)
- Sunny Day Sets Fire – Summer Palace (2007)
- The Black Ghosts – The Black Ghosts (2008)
- Telepathe – Chrome's On It (2008)
- Little Boots – Arecibo (2008)
- Telepathe – Dance Mother (2008)
- Fool's Gold – Fool's Gold (2009)
- Suckers – Suckers (2009)
- Thecocknbullkid – Querelle (2009)
- Florence and the Machine – Lungs (2010)
- Salem – King Night (2010)
- MEN – Talk About Body (2011)
- Fool's Gold – Leave No Trace (2011)
- Nikki Lane – Walk of Shame (2011)
- Bleeding Knees Club – Virginity (2011)
- NewVillager – NewVillager (2011)
- Lord Huron – Lonesome Dreams (2012)
- Charli XCX – True Romance (2013)
- Io Echo – Ministry of Love (2013)
- Lord Huron – Strange Trails (2015)
- T.O.L.D. – It's Not About the Witches (2016)
- Purple – Bodacious (2016)
- Mk.gee – A Museum of Contradiction (2020)
