= List of songs recorded by Florence and the Machine =

Songs by English indie band

Following are songs recorded by Florence and the Machine:

Key
†	Indicates single release
‡	Indicates promotional single release

List of songs recorded by Florence and the Machine
Song	Writer(s)	Release	Year	Ref.
"100 Years"	Florence Welch	High as Hope	2018	
"Addicted to Love"	Robert Palmer	B-Side of Lungs	2011	
"All This and Heaven Too"	Florence Welch; Isabella Summers	Ceremonials	2011	
"And Love"	Florence Welch; Mark Bowen	Everybody Scream	2025	
"Are You Hurting the One You Love?"	Christopher Lloyd Hayden; Tom Monger; Isabella Summers; Florence Welch	Lungs	2011	
"As Far as I Could Get"	Florence Welch; James Ford	How Big, How Blue, How Beautiful (Deluxe Edition)	2015	
"Back In Town"	Florence Welch Jack Antonoff	Dance Fever	2022	
"Bedroom Hymns"	Florence Welch; Amanda Gosein	Ceremonials (Deluxe Edition)	2011	
"Between Two Lungs"	Florence Welch; Isabella Summers	Lungs	2009	
"Big God" ‡	Florence Welch; Jamie Smith	High as Hope	2018	
"Bird Song"	Devonté Hynes; Florence Welch	B-Side of Lungs	2011	
"Blinding"	Florence Welch; Paul Epworth	Lungs	2009	
"The Bomb"	Florence Welch Robert Ackroyd Thomas Bartlett	Dance Fever	2022	
"Breaking Down" ‡	Florence Welch	Ceremonials	2011	
"Breath Of Life"	Florence Welch Isabella Summers	Snow White & the Huntsman (Original Motion Picture Soundtrack)	2012	
"Buckle" †	Florence Welch; Mitski Miyawaki	Everybody Scream	2025	
"Call Me Cruella" †	Florence Welch Jordan Powers Nicholas Britell Steph Jones Taura Stinson	Cruella (Original Motion Picture Soundtrack)	2021	
"Cassandra"	Florence Welch Kid Harpoon	Dance Fever	2022	
"Caught"	Florence Welch; James Ford	How Big, How Blue, How Beautiful	2015	
"Choreomania"	Florence Welch Jack Antonoff Thomas Bartlett	Dance Fever	2022	
"Conductor"	Florence Welch; Dan Wilson	How Big, How Blue, How Beautiful (Deluxe Edition)	2015	
"Cosmic Love" †	Florence Welch; Isabella Summers	Lungs	2009	
"Daffodil"	Florence Welch Dave Bayley	Dance Fever	2022	
"Delilah" †	Florence Welch; Isabella Summers	How Big, How Blue, How Beautiful	2015	
"Dog Days Are Over" †	Florence Welch; Isabella Summers	Lungs	2009	
"Donkey Kosh"	Florence Welch; Isabella Summers	Lungs (10th Anniversary Edition)	2019	
"Dream Girl Evil"	Florence Welch	Dance Fever	2022	
"Drinking Deep"	Danny L Harle; Florence Welch	Everybody Scream	2025	
"Drumming Song" †	Florence Welch; James Ford; Crispin Hunt	Lungs	2009	
"The End of Love"	Florence Welch; Tobias Jesso Jr.	High as Hope	2018	
"Everybody Scream" †	Florence Welch; Mark Bowen; Mitski Miyawaki	Everybody Scream	2025	
"Falling"	Florence Welch Isabella Summers	Lungs	2009	
"Free" †	Florence Welch Jack Antonoff	Dance Fever	2022	
"Ghosts"	Florence Welch Isabella Summers	Lungs (Deluxe Edition)	2009	
"Girl with One Eye"	Matt Alchin; David Ashby; James McCool	Lungs	2009	
"Girls Against God"	Florence Welch Jack Antonoff	Dance Fever	2022	
"Grace"	Florence Welch; Emile Haynie; Tobias Jesso Jr. Sampha Sisay	High as Hope	2018	
"Halo"	Evan Bogart; Beyoncé; Ryan Tedder	Lungs (Deluxe Edition)	2009	
"Hardest of Hearts"	Mark Anthony; Florence Welch	B-Sides of Lungs	2011	
"Haunted House"	Florence Welch Matthew Daniel Siskin	B-side to "Moderation"	2019	
"Heartlines"	Florence Welch; Paul Epworth	Ceremonials	2011	
"Heaven Is Here" ‡	Florence Welch	Dance Fever	2022	
"Heavy in Your Arms" †	Florence Welch Paul Epworth	The Twilight Saga: Eclipse (Original Motion Picture Soundtrack)	2010	
"Hiding"	Florence Welch James Ford	How Big, How Blue, How Beautiful (Deluxe Edition)	2015	
"Hospital Beds"	Cold War Kids	Lungs (Deluxe Edition)	2011	
"How Big, How Blue, How Beautiful"	Florence Welch; Isabella Summers	How Big, How Blue, How Beautiful	2015	
"Howl"	Florence Welch; Paul Epworth	Lungs	2009	
"Hunger" †	Florence Welch; Tobias Jesso Jr. Emile Haynie; Thomas Bartlett	High as Hope	2018	
"Hurricane Drunk"	Florence Welch; Eg White	Lungs	2009	
"I Will Be"	Florence Welch Emile Haynie	Songs from Final Fantasy XV	2016	
"I'm Not Calling You a Liar"	Florence Welch; Isabella Summers	Lungs	2009	
"Jackson"	Jerry Leiber; Billy Edd Wheeler	MTV Presents Unplugged: Florence + The Machine	2012	
"Jenny of Oldstones" †	Ramin Djawadi Daniel Weiss David Benioff George R. R. Martin	Game of Thrones: Season 8	2019	
"June"	Florence Welch	High as Hope	2018	
"Just A Girl" †	Gwen Stefani Tom Dumont	Yellowjackets: Season 2	2023	
"King" †	Florence Welch Jack Antonoff	Dance Fever	2022	
"Kiss with a Fist" †	Florence Welch; Matt Alchin	Lungs	2009	
"Kraken"	Florence Welch; Dave Bayley	Everybody Scream	2025	
"Landscape"	Florence Welch James Ford	Ceremonials (Deluxe Edition)	2011	
"Leave My Body"	Florence Welch; Paul Epworth	Ceremonials	2011	
"Light Of Love" †	Florence Welch Emile Haynie Thomas Bartlett Andrew Wyatt	Non-album single	2020	
"Long & Lost"	Florence Welch; Ester Dean	How Big, How Blue, How Beautiful	2015	
"Lover to Lover" †	Florence Welch	Ceremonials	2011	
"Make Up Your Mind"	Florence Welch Tom Hull	How Big, How Blue, How Beautiful (Deluxe Edition)	2015	
"Mermaids" †	Florence Welch David Bayley	Dance Fever (Complete Edition)	2023	
"Moderation" †	Florence Welch James Ford Thomas Bartlett Matthew Daniel Siskin	Non-album single	2019	
"Morning Elvis"	Florence Welch Dave Bayley	Dance Fever	2022	
"Mother"	Florence Welch; Paul Epworth	How Big, How Blue, How Beautiful	2015	
"Music by Men"	Florence Welch Aaron Dessner	Everybody Scream	2015	
"My Best Dress"	Florence Welch	Lungs (10th Anniversary Edition)	2019	
"My Boy Builds Coffins"	Florence Welch; Christopher Lloyd Hayden; Rob Ackroyd	Lungs	2009	
"My Love" †	Florence Welch Dave Bayley	Dance Fever	2022	
"Never Let Me Go" †	Florence Welch; Paul Epworth	Ceremonials	2011	
"No Choir"	Florence Welch; Emile Haynie; Andrew Wyatt	High as Hope	2018	
"No Light, No Light" †	Florence Welch; Isabella Summers	Ceremonials	2011	
"Oh! Darling"	John Lennon Paul McCartney	Lungs (Deluxe Edition)	2009	
"The Old Religion"	Florence Welch Aaron Dessner	Everybody Scream	2025	
"Only If for a Night"	Florence Welch; Paul Epworth	Ceremonials	2011	
"One Of the Greats" †	Mark Bowen Florence Welch	Everybody Scream	2025	
"Over the Love" ‡	Florence Welch Stuart Hammond Kid Harpoon SBTRKT	The Great Gatsby: Music from Baz Luhrmann's Film	2013	
"Patricia" †	Florence Welch; Emile Haynie; Thomas Bartlett	High as Hope	2018	
"Perfume and Milk"	Florence Welch Jack Antonoff	Everybody Scream	2025	
"Postcards From Italy"	Zachary Condon	Lungs (Deluxe Edition)	2009	
"Prayer Factory"	Florence Welch Jack Antonoff	Dance Fever	2022	
"Pure Feeling"	Florence Welch James Ford	How Big, How Blue, How Beautiful (Deluxe Edition)	2015	
"Queen of Peace" †	Florence Welch; Markus Dravs	How Big, How Blue, How Beautiful	2015	
"Rabbit Heart (Raise It Up)" †	Florence Welch; Paul Epworth	Lungs	2009	
"Remain Nameless"	Florence Welch Isabella Summers	Ceremonials (Deluxe Edition)	2011	
"Restraint"	Florence Welch Dave Bayley	Dance Fever	2022	
"Search and Destroy"	Iggy Pop James Williamson	Dance Fever (Deluxe Edition)	2022	
"Seven Devils"	Florence Welch; Paul Epworth	Ceremonials	2011	
"Shake It Out" †	Florence Welch; Paul Epworth	Ceremonials	2011	
"Ship to Wreck" †	Florence Welch; Tom Hull	How Big, How Blue, How Beautiful	2015	
"Sky Full of Song" †	Florence Welch; Emile Haynie; Thomas Bartlett	High as Hope	2018	
"South London Forever"	Florence Welch; Brett Shaw	High as Hope	2018	
"Spectrum" †	Florence Welch; Paul Epworth	Ceremonials	2011	
"Stand by Me" †	Ben E. King Jerry Leiber Mike Stoller	Songs from Final Fantasy XV	2016	
"St. Jude"	Florence Welch; James Ford	How Big, How Blue, How Beautiful	2015	
"Strangeness and Charm"	Florence Welch Paul Epworth	Ceremonials (Deluxe Edition)	2011	
"Swimming"	Florence Welch Alex James Simon Stafford Stephen Mackey	Lungs (Deluxe Edition)	2011	
"Sympathy Magic" †	Danny L Harle; Florence Welch	Everybody Scream	2025	
"Take Care"	Aubrey Graham; Anthony Palman; Noah Schebib	Ceremonials (Deluxe Edition)	2011	
"Third Eye"	Florence Welch	How Big, How Blue, How Beautiful	2015	
"Too Much Is Never Enough"	Florence Welch Emile Haynie Jeff Bhasker	Songs from Final Fantasy XV	2016	
"Various Storms and Saints"	Florence Welch; Markus Dravs	How Big, How Blue, How Beautiful	2015	
"What Kind of Man" †	Florence Welch; Tom Hull; John Hill	How Big, How Blue, How Beautiful	2015	
"What the Water Gave Me" ‡	Florence Welch; Eg White	Ceremonials	2011	
"Which Witch"	Florence Welch Isabella Summers	How Big, How Blue, How Beautiful (Deluxe Edition)	2015	
"Wish That You Were Here" †	Florence Welch Emile Haynie Andrew Wyatt	Miss Peregrine’s Home For Peculiar Children (Original Motion Picture Soundtrack)	2016	
"Witch Dance" †	Aaron Dessner; Mark Bowen; Florence Welch	Everybody Scream	2025	
"You Can Have It All"	Mark Bowen; Florence Welch	Everybody Scream	2025	
"You've Got the Love" †	John Bellamy; Arnecia Michelle Harris; Anthony B. Stephens	Lungs	2009	
