= List of frequent Tim Burton collaborators =

Tim Burton (born August 25, 1958) is an American filmmaker, animator, and artist, who often works with certain actors and crew members in multiple feature film directing projects.

Film composer Danny Elfman composed the music for most of Burton's feature films, except for Ed Wood (1994), Sweeney Todd: The Demon Barber of Fleet Street (2007), and Miss Peregrine's Home for Peculiar Children (2016). He also composed the music for The Nightmare Before Christmas (1993), a stop-motion animated film Burton co-wrote and produced.

The actors who collaborated with Burton the most frequently are Johnny Depp (8 films), Helena Bonham Carter (7 films), and Michael Keaton, Christopher Lee and Michael Gough (5 films each). Other actors that Burton has worked with more than once include Alan Arkin, Danny DeVito, Conchata Ferrell, Albert Finney, Carmen Filpi, Eva Green, Pat Hingle, Jan Hooks, Rance Howard, Jeffrey Jones, O-Lan Jones, Martin Landau, Lisa Marie, Jack Nicholson, Catherine O'Hara, Jenna Ortega, Michelle Pfeiffer, Missi Pyle, Paul Reubens, Alan Rickman, Deep Roy, Winona Ryder, Diane Salinger, Glenn Shadix, Martin Short, Timothy Spall, Terence Stamp, Sylvia Sidney, Christopher Walken, Frank Welker and Paul Whitehouse.

Actor Jason Hervey appeared in the short film Frankenweenie (1984), before appearing in Burton's feature film-directing debut Pee-wee's Big Adventure (1985). Actor Vincent Price worked with Burton on three projects, hosting the television film Hansel and Gretel (1983), narrating the short film Vincent (1982) and appearing in the feature film Edward Scissorhands (1990). Twin actresses Ada and Arlene Tai worked with Burton as uncredited extras in Ed Wood before being cast as the conjoined twins Ping and Jing in Big Fish (2003). In addition to starring in Beetlejuice (1988) and its sequel Beetlejuice Beetlejuice (2024), Edward Scissorhands and Frankenweenie (2012), Winona Ryder appeared in the Burton-directed music video for the Killers' 2012 single "Here with Me".

Catherine O’Hara, Glenn Shadix and Paul Reubens provided voices for The Nightmare Before Christmas (1993) after working with Burton on directorial projects.

Christina Ricci was the first actor to reunite with Burton for television, appearing as a series regular in Wednesday (2022–present) after starring in Sleepy Hollow (1999). Likewise, Jenna Ortega, the leading series regular of Wednesday, reunited with Burton shortly after, starring in Beetlejuice Beetlejuice (2024). Steve Buscemi also reunited with Burton as a series regular for the second season of Wednesday after starring in Big Fish as well as Joanna Lumley after voicing a role in Corpse Bride (2005), Anthony Michael Hall after appearing in Edward Scissorhands and Casper Van Dien after appearing in Sleepy Hollow. Eva Green and Winona Ryder will reunite with Burton as series regulars for the third season of Wednesday after Green worked with him in Dark Shadows (2012), Miss Peregrine's Home for Peculiar Children and Dumbo (2019) and Ryder worked with him in the Beetlejuice films, Edward Scissorhands and Frankeweenie as well as Noah Taylor after having a role in Charlie and the Chocolate Factory (2005) and Chris Sarandon after voicing a role in The Nightmare Before Christmas.

== Cast ==
Work Actor	1985	1988	1989	1990	1992	1994	1996	1999	2001	2003	2005		2007	2010	2012		2014	2016	2019	2024	—N/a
Work Actor	Pee-wee's Big Adventure	Beetlejuice	Batman	Edward Scissorhands	Batman Returns	Ed Wood	Mars Attacks!	Sleepy Hollow	Planet of the Apes	Big Fish	Charlie and the Chocolate Factory	Corpse Bride	Sweeney Todd: The Demon Barber of Fleet Street	Alice in Wonderland	Dark Shadows	Frankenweenie	Big Eyes	Miss Peregrine's Home for Peculiar Children	Dumbo	Beetlejuice Beetlejuice	Total
Alan Arkin				Yes															Yes		2
Helena Bonham Carter									Yes	Yes	Yes	Yes	Yes	Yes	Yes						7
Simmy Bow	Yes	Yes																			2
Steven Brill				Yes	Yes																2
Tommy Bush						Yes	Yes														2
Johnny Depp				Yes		Yes		Yes			Yes	Yes	Yes	Yes	Yes						8
Danny DeVito					Yes		Yes			Yes									Yes	Yes	5
Adam Drescher					Yes	Yes															2
Conchata Ferrell				Yes												Yes					2
Carmen Filpi	Yes	Yes				Yes															3
Albert Finney										Yes		Yes									2
Michael Gough			Yes		Yes			Yes				Yes		Yes							5
Eva Green															Yes			Yes	Yes		3
Garrick Hagon			Yes								Yes										2
Pat Hingle			Yes		Yes																2
Jan Hooks	Yes				Yes																2
Rance Howard						Yes	Yes														2
Jeffrey Jones		Yes				Yes		Yes													3
O-Lan Jones				Yes			Yes											Yes			3
Michael Keaton		Yes	Yes		Yes														Yes	Yes	5
Stuart Lancaster				Yes	Yes																2
Martin Landau						Yes		Yes								Yes					3
Christopher Lee								Yes			Yes	Yes		Yes	Yes						5
Lisa Marie						Yes	Yes	Yes	Yes												4
Jack Nicholson			Yes				Yes														2
Catherine O'Hara		Yes														Yes				Yes	3
Jessica Oyelowo								Yes						Yes							2
Sarah Jessica Parker						Yes	Yes														2
Michelle Pfeiffer					Yes										Yes						2
Philip Philmar											Yes		Yes					Yes	Yes	Yes	5
Missi Pyle										Yes	Yes										2
Paul Reubens	Yes				Yes																2
Alan Rickman													Yes	Yes							2
Deep Roy									Yes	Yes	Yes	Yes									4
Winona Ryder		Yes		Yes												Yes				Yes	4
Diane Salinger	Yes				Yes																2
Glenn Shadix		Yes							Yes												2
Martin Short							Yes									Yes					2
Sylvia Sidney		Yes					Yes														2
Timothy Spall													Yes	Yes							2
Terence Stamp																	Yes	Yes			2
Philip Tan			Yes						Yes												2
Harry Taylor											Yes		Yes	Yes	Yes			Yes	Yes		6
Christopher Walken					Yes			Yes													2
Frank Welker							Yes							Yes		Yes					3
Paul Whitehouse												Yes		Yes							2
Biff Yeager				Yes	Yes	Yes															3

== Crew ==
Burton also often works with certain crew members in multiple directing projects. This includes screenwriters Warren Skaaren, Caroline Thompson, John August, Scott Alexander and Larry Karaszewski, Seth Grahame-Smith and Alfred Gough & Miles Millar, producers Denise Di Novi, Allison Abbate, Richard D. Zanuck, and Derek Frey, composer Danny Elfman, composer/music supervisor/music producer/music editor Mike Higham, sound engineer Tony Dawe, costume designer Colleen Atwood, production designers Bo Welch, Alex McDowell, and Rick Heinrichs, cinematographers Stefan Czapsky, Philippe Rousselot, Dariusz Wolski, and Bruno Delbonnel, makeup artists Ve Neill, Stan Winston, and Rick Baker, and editor/executive producer Chris Lebenzon. Burton has worked with director Henry Selick on The Nightmare Before Christmas (1993) and James and the Giant Peach (1996), the former of which Burton co-wrote. He has also worked with fellow producer/director Timur Bekmambetov and producer Jim Lemley on 9 (2009) and Abraham Lincoln: Vampire Hunter (2012), for which Bekmambetov also served as director. Burton has also collaborated with puppet manufacturers Mackinnon & Saunders five times: a failed attempt on Mars Attacks!, Corpse Bride, Frankenweenie, Beetlejuice Beetlejuice and the second season of Wednesday.
