= The Bourne Legacy =

The Bourne Legacy may refer to:

- The Bourne Legacy (novel), a 2004 novel by Eric Van Lustbader
- The Bourne Legacy (film), a 2012 film starring Jeremy Renner
- The Bourne Legacy (soundtrack), a 2012 soundtrack from the film
