= Miss Peregrine's Home for Peculiar Children (soundtrack) =

2016 film score

Miss Peregrine's Home for Peculiar Children (Original Motion Picture Soundtrack)

Film score by Mike Higham and Matthew Margeson
- Released: October 7, 2016
- Recorded: 2016
- Studios: Abbey Road; AIR; Holy Trinity Church
- Genre: Film score
- Length: 70:11
- Labels: Fox Music; La-La Land
- Producers: Mike Higham; Matthew Margeson

Singles from Miss Peregrine's Home for Peculiar Children (Original Motion Picture Soundtrack)
- 1. "Wish That You Were Here" Released: August 26, 2016

Miss Peregrine's Home for Peculiar Children (Original Motion Picture Soundtrack) is a 2016 soundtrack composed by Mike Higham and Matthew Margeson for the film of the same name directed by Tim Burton. It was released on October 7, 2016, in a digital format through Fox Music, and on cd through La-La Land Records.

== Background ==
Miss Peregrine's Home for Peculiar Children marked Burton's third film after Ed Wood (1994) and Sweeney Todd: The Demon Barber of Fleet Street (2007), not to be scored by his regular collaborator Danny Elfman. He did not involve in the project as he was simultaneously scoring Alice Through the Looking Glass (2016; co-produced by Burton) and also prioritized his commitments for writing a violin concerto. Burton then chose Mike Higham and Matthew Margeson to write the score for the film; the former worked as a music editor and supervisor on Burton's films, notably Alice in Wonderland (2010) and Frankenweenie (2012).

The duo wrote different cues simultaneously and recorded them at the Abbey Road and AIR Studios in London. Over 110 minutes of score had been written for the film, while the soundtrack excluded most of the cues where the final duration is about 70 minutes. Each cues range from 1–6 minutes and majority of the musical pieces are around 2–3 minutes. While recording the film's music, Margeson brought keyboards, computer screens and speakers from his studio in Los Angeles to London and eventually built a makeshift studio there. Some of the equipment includes the Steinberg Cubase sequencer, online software synths, sample libraries from Kontakt and Pro Tools. Margeson described the project as is longest where he recorded for eight months and at one point, he had recorded for eight days consecutively.

Florence and the Machine recorded the song "Wish That You Were Here", the song was released as a digital single on August 26, 2016. The soundtrack was released by Fox Music in digital platforms on October 7, a week after the film's release, whereas La-La Land Records distributed it in CDs in online on October 11 and through retail stores three days later.

== Reception ==
Johnny Brayson of Bustle wrote that "the soundtrack to Miss Peregrine's Home for Peculiar Children will be just as enchanting and otherworldly as what's happening on the screen". Scott Mendelson of Forbes described it as "compelling". Marc Ciafardini of The Film Stage opined that the score "make the experience feel fresh rather than stale". Kevin McCarthy of Fox 5 New York summarized that the score "really blended beautifully with Burton's storytelling".

== Track listing ==
Miss Peregrine's Home for Peculiar Children (Original Motion Picture Soundtrack) track listing
| No. | Title | Length |
|---|---|---|
| 1. | "Miss Peregrine's Home for Peculiar Children" | 2:46 |
| 2. | "Bedtime Stories" | 2:11 |
| 3. | "Arrival at the Island" | 2:26 |
| 4. | "A Place Like This" | 1:43 |
| 5. | "Squirrel Rescue" | 2:31 |
| 6. | "Enoch's Dolls" | 2:46 |
| 7. | "Projecting Dreams" | 1:44 |
| 8. | "The Augusta" | 5:24 |
| 9. | "I'll Be Here Forever" | 2:32 |
| 10. | "Barron's Experiment" | 5:35 |
| 11. | "Barron Revealed" | 2:45 |
| 12. | "Surprise Visitor" | 4:52 |
| 13. | "Hollow Attack" | 5:24 |
| 14. | "Raising the Augusta" | 2:08 |
| 15. | "Blackpool" | 2:36 |
| 16. | "Standoff at Blackpool Tower" | 3:14 |
| 17. | "Handy Candy" | 3:27 |
| 18. | "Ymbrynes, Ymbrynes, Here I Come" | 4:07 |
| 19. | "Peculiars vs. Wights" | 3:28 |
| 20. | "Two Jakes" | 2:16 |
| 21. | "Go to Her" | 6:16 |
| Total length: | | 70:11 |

== Personnel ==
Credits adapted from CD liner notes.

- Art direction – Dan Goldwasser
- Liner notes – Tim Burton
- Music composer and producer – Matthew Margeson, Mike Higham
- Recording and mixing – Andrew Dudman
- Digital recordist – Fiona Cruickshank
- Mastering – Gavin Lurssen
- Music editor – Peter Clarke
- Technical score engineer – Fabio Marks
- Music supervisor – Patrick Houlihan
- Musical assistance – Alex Ferguson, John Prestage, Laurence Anslow

Orchestra

- Orchestrator and conductor – Tim Davies
- Additional orchestration – Andres Montero, Jeremy Levy
- Orchestra contractor – Isobel Griffith, Lucy Whalley
- Choir conductor – Gavin Greenaway
- Choir contractor – Jenny O'Grady
- Copyist – Joann Kane Music Service, Mark Graham
- Music librarian – Dave Hage

Management (20th Century Fox)

- Soundtrack co-ordinator – Joann Orgel
- Music production supervisor – Rebecca Morellato
