= Newport (Ymerodraeth State of Mind) =

2009 song by Terema Wainwright and Alex Warren

"Newport (Ymerodraeth State of Mind)" is a parody version of the 2009 "Empire State of Mind" by Jay-Z and Alicia Keys. Recorded by singer Terema Wainwright and rapper Alex Warren, the 2010 music video was directed by MJ Delaney. The word "ymerodraeth" means "empire" in Welsh. The song features extensive references to the city of Newport in South Wales.

== Production and release ==
The video was directed by filmmaker MJ Delaney, and featured singer Terema Wainwright and rapper Alex Warren. Both Wainright and Warren were London-based, although Wainwright grew up in Pencarreg, Carmarthenshire. The lyrics were written by Tom Williams, Leo Sloley and MJ Delaney, and feature numerous references to the city of Newport and Welsh popular culture. Warren and Wainwright performed the song live at the 2010 Newport Cityfest.

The video was published on 20 July 2010, and amassed over 2 million views on YouTube before it was taken down due to a claim by EMI Music Publishing on 10 August, who stated that the uploader did not seek permission from the original songwriters.

The lack of a fair dealing exclusion for parody works, exercised by EMI in their takedown notice, was cited in the Hargreaves Review on Copyright, commissioned by the Newport-based Intellectual Property Office. The review evolved into the Copyright (Public Administration) Regulations 2014.

== Responses ==
Newport-based rap group Goldie Lookin Chain released a "parody of a parody" video in response titled "You're Not From Newport", alleging that their rivals lacked local knowledge.

The song was the inspiration for actor Russell Gomer's parody "Ain't Seen Ruthin Yet", based on the song "You Ain't Seen Nothing Yet" by Bachman–Turner Overdrive and the town of Ruthin in Denbighshire.

In 2011, a new parody version, also directed by Delaney, was filmed and broadcast on Comic Relief. It featured numerous Welsh celebrities lip-synching to the original version. It starred Josie d'Arby, Steve Jones, Paul Whitehouse, Siân Lloyd, Connie Fisher, John Humphrys, Gethin Jones, Helen Lederer, Robbie Savage, Anneka Rice, Ruth Madoc, Tim Vincent, Howard Marks, Gareth Jones, Lisa Rogers, Helen Adams, Max Boyce, Joe Calzaghe, Dirty Sanchez, Wynne Evans, Goldie Lookin Chain, Colin Jackson, Grant Nicholas, Shakin' Stevens, Michael Sheen, Imogen Thomas, Bonnie Tyler, Alex Jones and Ian Woosnam.
