= Patricia Kane =

British actress (1929–2022)

- Born: Patricia Mary Howse; 4 June 1929; Cardiff, Wales
- Died: 12 August 2022 (aged 93); Wokingham, England
- Other names: Patricia Mary Evans
- Occupation: Actress
- Spouse: Howell Evans (m. 1950; died 2014)
- Children: 1

Patricia Mary Evans (4 June 1929 – 12 August 2022), better known by her stage name, Patricia Kane, was a British actress who appeared in a range of television roles from the 1950s through to the 2010s.

Kane was also known for her work in theatre productions, as well as her charity work, alongside her husband Howell Evans.

== Personal life and death ==
Kane was born in Cardiff, Wales on 4 June 1929 as Patrica Mary Howse.

Kane married actor Howell Evans in 1950. They had one son, born in 1953. Howell Evans died in 2014.

Kane died in Wokingham on 12 August 2022, aged 93. Her death was announced by performing arts union Equity on 25 May 2023.

== Selected filmography ==
- Open All Hours (1985)
- The Bill (three appearances in 1985, 1997 and 2002)
- The Vicar of Dibley (1994)
- Neverwhere (1996)
- My Family (2003)
- Doctors (2004)
- Little Britain (2004)
- Stella (2016)
- Bryn (2020)
