= After Earth (soundtrack) =

After Earth (Original Motion Picture Soundtrack)

Film score by James Newton Howard
- Released: May 28, 2013
- Recorded: August–October 2012
- Genre: Newman Scoring Stage, 20th Century Fox, Los Angeles; Sony Scoring Stage, Sony Pictures, Culver City
- Length: 57:20
- Label: Sony Masterworks
- Producer: James Newton Howard

James Newton Howard chronology
The Bourne Legacy (2012)	After Earth (2013)	The Hunger Games: Catching Fire (2013)

After Earth (Original Motion Picture Soundtrack) is the soundtrack to the 2013 film After Earth directed by M. Night Shyamalan and starring Jaden Smith and Will Smith; the film's score is composed by James Newton Howard, whose inclusion was confirmed in July 2012, conducted by Pete Anthony and performed by the Hollywood Studio Symphony. The film is Howard's eighth collaboration with Shyamalan. Sony Masterworks released the 28-track score album on May 28, 2013.

== Critical reception ==
Thomas Glorieux, in his review for Maintitles.net described it as an "average album is only held together by its begin and end". James Southall of Movie Wave also described it as "the least impressive of Howard’s score albums from Shyamalan films". In contrast, Filmtracks.com reviewed "After Earth is a robust Howard effort that could potentially go unnoticed by those dismissing the film. It's standard fare, and a lack of a global sense of tragedy for the fate of Earth is an issue. The primal textures do grate in an environment that tries at the same time to be a touching father and son bonding score. But all of that said, give this one a chance and rearrange it as needed."

Katy Vans of Blueprint wrote "This is ok, not great, but who needs great; it serves a purpose". Chris Bumbray of JoBlo.com wrote: "The musical score by James Newton Howard is excellent". Luke Mullen of Film School Rejects wrote "The score by James Newton Howard is subtle and not overused but also not particularly memorable." A review from The New Indian Express summarized that "kudos to composer James Newton Howard, for a strong soundtrack that blends into the film."

== Post-release ==
Howard re-recorded a piece of the score suite from the film, to be included in his studio album Night After Night; a compilation of Howard's scores for Shyamalan's films. Pianist Jean-Yves Thibaudet performed the suite as the featured soloist.

== Track listing ==
After Earth (Original Motion Picture Soundtrack) track listing
No.	Title	Length
1.	"The History of Man"	2:23
2.	"I'm Not Advancing You"	1:28
3.	"Pack Your Bags"	1:40
4.	"Leaving Nova Prime"	0:48
5.	"Can You Ghost?"	2:09
6.	"Ship Tears Apart"	2:17
7.	"Kitai Finds Cypher"	1:19
8.	"Get Me into the Cockpit"	1:36
9.	"The Mission"	1:31
10.	"Baboons"	2:51
11.	"Kitai on Earth"	2:56
12.	"Four Vials Remain, Sir"	1:11
13.	"Run to the Falls"	2:42
14.	"Abort Mission"	2:02
15.	"Bird Attack"	1:02
16.	"Nest Battle"	2:03
17.	"Safety in the Hog Hole"	3:42
18.	"Saved by the Bird"	0:52
19.	"The Tail"	1:40
20.	"Dad, Are You There?"	2:46
21.	"Leech"	2:59
22.	"See the Peak"	2:21
23.	"Run to the Volcano"	0:37
24.	"Somewhere to Hide"	1:22
25.	"Chase Through the Cave"	3:07
26.	"Ghosting"	4:45
27.	"I Wanna Work with Mom"	1:17
28.	"After Earth"	1:54
Total length:		57:20

== Personnel ==
- Music composer and producer – James Newton Howard
- Co-producer – Jim Weidman, Sven Faulconer
- Programming – Sunna Wehrmeijer, Sven Faulconer
- Recording – Shawn Murphy, Erik Swanson, Larry Mah
- Mixing – Shawn Murphy
- Mastering – Louie Teran
- Score editor – David Channing
- Music editor – David Olson
- Supervising music editor – Jim Weidman
- Sound designer – Clay Duncan
- Auricle control systems – Richard Grant
- Music coordinator – Pamela Sollie
- Musical assistance – Christopher Wray

Orchestra

- Orchestra – The Hollywood Studio Symphony
- Orchestration – Jeff Atmajian, Jon Kull, Pete Anthony, Peter Bateman
- Orchestra leader – Belinda Broughton
- Conductor – Pete Anthony, Mike Nowak
- Orchestra contractor – DeCrescent Zimmitti Music Contracting
- Music librarian – Andrew Hauschild, Mark Graham
- Copyist – Joann Kane Music Service
- Scoring crew – Adam Michalak, Christine Sirois, David Marquette, Denis St. Amand, Greg Dennen, Greg Loskorn, Matt Ward, Tim Lauber, Tom Steel

Choir

- Choir – Aleta Braxton, Alice Kirwan Murray, Alvin Chea, Amy Fogerson, Arnold Livingston Geis, Beth Andersen, Bob Joyce, Christen Herman, Christopher Gambol, Clydene Jackson, David Loucks, Edie Lehmann Boddicker, Edward Bruner, Elin Carlson, Eric Bradley, Fletcher Sheridan, Gerald White, Harriet Fraser, Jennifer Graham, Joan Beal, John West, Karen Whipple Schnurr, Leanna Brand, Michael Geiger, Michael Lichtenauer, Michele Hemmings, Monique Donnelly, Niké St. Clair, Omar Crook, Patricia Ann Walsh, Reid Bruton, Rick Logan, Sally Stevens, Scott Graff, Shawn Kirchner, Stephen Grimm, Suzanne Waters, Teri Koide, Walter Harrah, Will Goldman
- Choir contractor – Edie Lehmann Boddicker

Instruments

- Bass – Bruce Morgenthaler, Chris Kollgaard, David Parmeter, Drew Dembowski, Ed Meares, Mike Valerio, Neil Garber, Nico Abondolo, Oscar Hidalgo, Steve Dress
- Bassoon – Allen Savedoff, Ken Munday, Michael O'Donovan, Rose Corrigan
- Baroque cello – Heather Vorwerck, Kyung Choi, Leif Woodward, Shirley Hunt
- Cello – Andrew Shulman, Tony Cooke, Armen Ksajikian, Cecilia Tsan, Tina Soule, Chris Ermacoff, David Speltz, Dennis Karmazyn, Erika Duke, Kim Scholes, John Walz, Matt Cooker, Paula Hochhalter, Stan Sharp, Steve Erdody, Tim Landauer, Tim Loo, Trevor Handy, Xiaodan Zheng, Cecilia Tsan, Maya Beiser
- Clarinet – Ben Lulich, Don Foster, Ralph Williams, Stuart Clark
- Flute – Geri Rotella, Heather Clark, Steve Kujala
- Guitar – Christopher Wray
- Harp – Gayle Levant
- Horns – Allen Fogle, Daniel Kelley, Dylan Hart, Jim Thatcher, Jenny Kim, Keith Popejoy, Mark Adams, Phil Yao, Steve Becknell
- Oboe – David Weiss, Jessica Pearlman, Lara Wickes, Leslie Reed
- Percussion – Alan Estes, Bob Zimmitti, Peter Limonick, Wade Culbreath
- Piano – Randy Kerber
- Trombone – Alex Iles, Andy Malloy, Bill Reichenbach, Mike Hoffman, Steve Holtman, Bill Booth
- Trumpet – Dave Washburn, Jon Lewis, Malcolm McNab, Marissa Benedict, Tim Morrison
- Tuba – Doug Tornquist, Jim Self
- Viola – Alma Fernandez, Andrew Duckles, Brian Dembow, Carolyn Riley, Darrin McCann, David Walther, Erik Rynearson, Jennie Hansen, Jerome Gordon, Kate Vincent, Keith Greene, Marlow Fisher, Matt Funes, Mike Nowak, Pam Goldsmith, Rob Brophy, Roland Kato, Shawn Mann, Thomas Diener, Vicky Miskolczy
- Viola d'Amore – Adriana Zoppo, Jennie Hansen, Pam Goldsmith, Roland Kato
- Viola da Gamba – Shanon Zusman
- Violin – Aimee Kreston, Alyssa Park, Amy Hershberger, Ana Landauer, Anatoly Rosinsky, Belinda Broughton, Bruce Dukov, Charlie Bisharat, Clayton Haslop, Dimitrie Leivici, Endre Granat, Eun-Mee Ahn, Haim Shtrum, Helen Nightengale, Irina Voloshina, Jackie Brand, Jay Rosen, Jeanne Skrocki, Josefina Vergara, Julie Gigante, Katia Popov, Kevin Connolly, Lisa Sutton, Lorand Lokuszta, Lorenz Gamma, Marc Sazer, Miwako Watanabe, Natalie Leggett, Nina Eutuhov, Phillip Levy, Radu Pieptea, Rafael Rishik, Richard Altenbach, Roberto Cani, Sara Parkins, Sarah Thornblade, Shalini Vijayan, Tammy Hatwan, Tereza Stanislav
- Violone – Denise Briese
- Woodwinds – Pedro Eustache

== Accolades ==
Accolades for After Earth (Original Motion Picture Soundtrack)
Awards	Category	Result	Ref.
World Soundtrack Awards	Film Composer of the Year	Nominated (Note: also for The Bourne Legacy (2012))	
