= Bethan Witcomb =

Welsh actress

- Born: Bethan Witcomb; Ebbw Vale, Wales
- Education: Royal Welsh College of Music and Drama
- Years active: 2006–present

Bethan Witcomb is a Welsh actress, known for playing Zoe in the Sky One series Stella.

== Filmography ==
Year	Title	Role	Notes
2006	Deadly Tantrum	Girl	Short film
2013	Casualty	Sooz Fischer	1 episode
2013	Love and Marriage	Ruth	1 episode
2013–2017	Stella	Zoe	Main role
2019	Doctors	Jessica Ricards	1 episode

== Theatre ==
Title	Role	Production
CORIOLAN/US	Virgilia	National Theatre of Wales
BRUISED	Stephanie	Clwyd Theatr Cymru
MEA MAXIMA CULPA	Actor	Old VIc 24 Hour Plays
CROUCH, TOUCH, PAUSE, ENGAGE	Vonnie, Medeleine Moon	Out of Joint/NT Wales/Arcola Theatre
