= Russell Gomer =

Welsh actor

- Born: Russell Gomer; Treforest, Wales
- Years active: 0.3

Russell Gomer is a Welsh actor who has worked extensively in television roles. He is best known for playing Yanto in the Sky1 TV comedy drama series Stella.

== Filmography ==
=== TV ===
Year	Title	Character	Production	Notes
2013	Stella	Yanto Bead	Sky 1	Series 1,2,3,4,5 and 6

== Ain't Seen Ruthin Yet ==
In 2010 Gomer released an internet video musical parody in response to the success of the Newport parody Newport (Ymerodraeth State of Mind). The song called 'Ain't Seen Ruthin Yet' referenced the North Wales town of Ruthin to the tune of the Bachman-Turner Overdrive rock classic 'You Ain't Seen Nothing Yet. Gomer released the video under the name of spoof actor David Garland Jones, a comedy creation of writer Jon Tregenna. As David Garland Jones he subsequently released a 13-song video.
