= List of Stella (British TV series) episodes =

Stella is a British comedy-drama series created and written by David Peet and Ruth Jones, who played the lead role. Stella was one of the flagship television comedy series that had been commissioned and aired on Sky One from 2012 to 2017. A total of 58 episodes, each with a duration of 45 minutes, were aired over the course of six series, including two Christmas specials in 2014 and 2016 respectively. The sixth and final series began on 13 September 2017. In their media pack, Sky One confirmed this would be the last series of the show.

== Series overview ==
Series	Episodes	Originally released	
Series	Episodes	First released	Last released
1	10	6 January 2012	9 March 2012
2	10	11 January 2013	8 March 2013
3	10	24 January 2014	28 March 2014
Special (2014)		22 December 2014	
4	10	6 February 2015	10 April 2015
5	10	12 January 2016	15 March 2016
Special (2016)		23 December 2016	
6	6	13 September 2017	18 October 2017

== Episodes ==
=== Series 1 (2012) ===
No. overall	No. in series	Title	Directed by	Written by	Original release date	Viewers (millions)
1	1	"Episode One"	Sue Tully	Ruth Jones	6 January 2012	1.42
Single mother Stella Morris has a lot on her plate. With son, Luke, in prison for stealing cars, daughter, Emma, want to leave school before doing her exams, and Ben is appearing in the school play. While giving herself a makeover in Emma’s room, Stella finds the birth control pill and a huge row erupts, which comes to a head when Emma insults her mother about her lack of a sex life. They don't speak for several days, but when they do make amends, Emma delivers the shock news that she is pregnant. Guest star(s): Gillian McKeith
2	2	"Episode Two"	Sue Tully	Ruth Jones and Georgia Pritchett	13 January 2012	
Still reeling from Emma’s revelation, Stella wants to keep it secret. But Emma has already told Ben, her father and grandparents and word soon gets around the rest of Pontyberry. When Emma tells Stella that Sunil’s parents want them to get married, they fall out again and Emma moves in with the Choudarys. Stella has a laundry disaster and local decorator, Sean, saves the day, later making Stella see sense out of the whole Emma situation and they are reunited at the engagement party being thrown by Sunil’s parents.
3	3	"Episode Three"	Tony Dow	Robert Evans and Ruth Jones	21 January 2012 (Note: A technical fault caused this episode to be broadcast for 40 minutes without sound before being replaced by a repeat of The Simpsons, in its usual Friday evening slot.)	
When local rugby hero Dick “The Kick” Jenkins dies, the whole town goes into mourning and Paula is asked to organise the funeral. Neil Kinnock gives the eulogy, but at the wake, it is revealed Dick didn't have a penny to his name and Paula goes into panic as she was already overdrawn. But Sean comes to the rescue again when he and Stella hold a fake raffle to raise funds. Stella later gets an unexpected surprise - Luke has been released from prison early. Guest star(s): Eamonn Holmes, Neil Kinnock, Colin Charvis, Warren Gatland, Colin Jackson, Gethin Jones, Mike Phillips, Graham Price, Gareth Thomas and Shane Williams
4	4	"Episode Four"	Tony Dow	Ruth Jones and Robert Evans	27 January 2012	1.19
Luke is struggling to find a job and Stella tries to protect her eldest when she finds out Luke was seen talking to local drug dealer, Keckers. Big Rae offers Luke a job as the handyman at the gym, but when Luke learns of Stella interfering, he tells his mother to keep her nose out of his business. Sean sees Luke in the street with Keckers and it all comes to a head at the “Celebrity Fun Day” when Sean confronts Luke and a huge fight breaks out. After it is broken up, Luke reveals he was giving the drugs back, before Sunil’s father, Jagadeesh, gives him a job working in the Post Office. Guest star(s): Keith Chegwin, Debbie McGee and Andrew Stone
5	5	"Episode Five"	Juliet May	Steve Speirs and Ruth Jones	3 February 2012	1.34
Dai is accused of benefit fraud and finds out he owes £10,000. He chickens out of telling Paula, though, opting to have one last night of passion with her before scarpering, leaving Paula a letter. After days of not hearing from him, Dai and Stella’s parents receive a postcard from Dai, leading to Stella, Paula, Sean and Luke going off in search of Dai in the Brecon Beacons, with the couple eventually sharing an emotional reunion. Stella has her date with Sean and after going back to his flat for a nightcap, they sleep together. Ben gets a letter from Rob Morgan with information regarding his family tree project and a letter for Luke and after trying to tell his mother and grandfather, Ben gives the letter to Luke.
6	6	"Episode Six"	Juliet May	Ruth Jones	10 February 2012	1.23
Word gets around about Sunil kissing another woman and Emma finishes with him, but they quickly reunite. But while out running errands for Jagadeesh, Luke spots Sunil with the aforementioned woman and tells Stella, who follows her future son in-law and learns he has been taking dance lessons for the wedding. Stella is surprised to learn that Alan has been in love with her since 1984. Alan later meets a woman called Nancy at a group and she takes an instant liking to him. Luke reads the letter from his estranged father and meets Rob for the first time.
7	7	"Episode Seven"	Sue Tully	Ruth Jones and Rob Gittins	17 February 2012	1.33
Luke has a brief first meeting with Rob, before having a chance encounter when the shop van breaks down and Rob stops to help, where it is revealed that Rob has sent a birthday card every year since Luke was born, but it was always returned. Luke later shows up at Rob’s hotel and tells him if he wants to put things right, he should come to Luke’s 25th birthday. Elsewhere, Sean gives Stella a boxing lesson, which turns into a sparring session with Joe Calzaghe. It appears Stella has knocked out the world champion, only for it to turn out to be a practical joke and she retaliates by actually knocking out Sean! At Luke’s party, Sunil’s sister, Jasminder, tries to impress Luke, but makes a show of herself with her over-the-top outfit. But Rob steals the show when he appears. Stella is shellshocked and confronts her first love. Guest star(s): Joe Calzaghe
8	8	"Episode Eight"	Sue Tully	Ben Edwards, Simon Ludders and Ruth Jones	24 February 2012	1.22
Sunil tells Jagadeesh he doesn't want to do the Grease themed stag do, but Dai steps in and takes the boy on a camping trip in the Brecon Beacons, where Luke and Rob bond and Luke hints at moving to Canada to make a fresh start. The girls go to a hotel for Emma’s hen party, where Stella, upset that Rob has done on the stag, gets drunk and makes a show of herself. Dai overhears Luke and Rob talking about the possibility of Luke moving to Canada and tells Paula, who reluctantly passes on the news to an intoxicated Stella, who reacts furiously and lashes out, before storming out of the hotel.
9	9	"Episode Nine"	Sandy Johnson	Ben Edwards, Simon Ludders and Ruth Jones	2 March 2012	1.11
The single mother struggles to accept Luke's decision to move to Canada with Rob, and Emma's geography exam takes an unexpected turn. Meanwhile, Paula gets concerned when Dai visibly feels the pressure of his looming court appearance.
10	10	"Episode Ten"	Sandy Johnson	Ruth Jones	9 March 2012	1.14
The family celebrates the arrival of Emma's baby, which hampers the wedding plans, much to the annoyance of Jasminder. Meanwhile, Luke prepares to leave for Canada, Bobby gets ready to move to Bristol with new boyfriend Steve, and Rob has some shocking news for Stella at Luke's leaving party. Guest starring James Corden. Last Appearance of Meg Kosh

=== Series 2 (2013) ===
No. overall	No. in series	Title	Directed by	Written by	Original release date	Viewers (millions)
11	1	"Episode One"	Mandie Fletcher	Ruth Jones	11 January 2013	1.36
Stella and Sean are preparing for their new arrival, while Emma is settling into married life with Sunil. But domestic bliss looks like being short-lived for both mother and daughter when Rob's business dealings bring him back to Pontyberry and Sunil enrols at medical school - and soon takes to the boozy student life. Meanwhile, Dai begins working at the funeral home with wife Paula, causing untold problems for the couple. First appearance of Aunty Brenda
12	2	"Episode Two"	Mandie Fletcher	Ben Edwards and Simon Ludders	18 January 2013	1.26
Sean plans to leave Pontyberry after Stella's confession that he might not be the father of her baby, and it isn't long before the gossips get wind of this latest development. But some familiar faces are back - Luke is home from Canada, having been deported for hiding his criminal record, and Bobby has also returned - and just in the nick of time for Paula, who has reached the end of her tether with Dai.
13	3	"Episode Three"	Sarah O'Gorman	Ben Edwards and Simon Ludders	25 January 2013	1.33
After back-to-back bombshells from the doctor and Sean, Stella feels as if her life is officially over, so Aunty Brenda gets her a job at the Bap Factory, hoping she will be able to bake away the blues. But her first day takes an unsavoury turn. Twinkle-toed astrologer Russell Grant is in town to open Karl and Nadine's salon, Dai and Paula continue to have problems in the bedroom and Emma fights for her man at Sunil's student ball.
14	4	"Episode Four"	Sarah O'Gorman	Karen Laws	1 February 2013	1.19
Emma and Sunil kiss and make up, but if Leah has anything to do with it the young couple may not be playing happy families for long. Dai's hopes of a quick marital fix also look bleak when Paula considers turning her night away from home into a permanent arrangement, and Alan is heartbroken to discover the rugby club is closing down. Luckily for the troubled residents of Pontyberry, help is at hand in the shape of Dutch life coach Peschman, who has some wise words of guidance and a unique form of therapy. First appearance of Peschman Hodd
15	5	"Episode Five"	Minkie Spiro	Abigail Wilson	8 February 2013	1.09
Ashley Banjo brings Got to Dance to the valleys, so Ben persuades Little Alan to enter, hoping he can win the fame and fortune needed to save the rugby club from closure. The only problem is, the would-be star has two left feet. Can Bobby's choreography do the trick? Stella attends her fancy-dress school reunion, where she takes a liking to Rob in his Tom Cruise costume, while hopes of a reconciliation between Paula and Dai look bleak after a scandalous confession. First appearance of Zoe
16	6	"Episode Six"	Minkie Spiro	Matthew Leys and Martin Trenaman	15 February 2013	1.05
After the disastrous school reunion, Stella tries to forget her drunken misdemeanours by working at the undertakers, but there's nowhere to hide when she accidentally interrupts a moment of passion between Rob and Melissa. Alan discovers the rugby club is falling into the hands of a property development company, so he plans an ambitious counter-attack, while Paula offers to babysit Emma's son - only to lose the child on the way to his naming ceremony. First appearance of George The Butcher
17	7	"Episode Seven"	Tony Dow	Robert Evans	22 February 2013	1.17
The heart-broken Dai is still missing but Paula refuses to suffer alone like her estranged partner and instead expresses her feelings at the long-awaited Got to Dance auditions, where she gives Ashley Banjo a show he'll never forget. Bobby faces his first solo funeral, only for two parties to arrive at the cemetery to find only one plot, while Luke trades punches - and butts heads - with Lenny in the amateur boxing championship. The dance competition scene includes a cameo appearance by Ashley Banjo as a judge.
18	8	"Episode Eight"	Tony Dow	Steve Speirs	1 March 2013	1.14
It's fight night in Pontyberry, and while Lenny is determined to win whatever it takes - even if it means playing dirty - Luke's mind is elsewhere as he sets his sights on Zoe. Alan remortgages his house to raise funds for the rugby club, a risky strategy if Melissa follows through with her threat to apply for sole custody of Little Alan, and Paula resorts to desperate measures to win Dai back.
19	9	"Episode Nine"	Tony Dow	Ruth Jones and Steve Speirs	8 March 2013	1.14
Rob and Stella try to rebuild their trust in each other, but hopes of a reunion are cut short by the surprise return of Sean, who has startling news. Alan discovers he has the Casanova touch, which comes in handy when his remortgage application is rejected, and he teams up with Auntie Brenda to organise a charity game for the rugby club. Elsewhere, Emma's pent-up anger with Sunil finally reaches tipping point.
20	10	"Episode Ten"	Tony Dow	Ruth Jones	8 March 2013	1.08
Rob makes Stella a life-changing offer - but as chaos engulfs her family and friends, can she accept it? Last Appearance of Dai Kosh, Sean McGaskill and Peschman Hodd

=== Series 3 (2014) ===
No. overall	No. in series	Title	Directed by	Written by	Original release date	Viewers (millions)
21	1	""Arrival of Michael Jackson and New Job"""	Sarah O'Gorman	Ruth Jones and David Peet	24 January 2014	1.01
Now sporting a rather spiffy blonde do, the very single mum is focusing all her energy on her family and nursing degree, though the arrival of handsome lawyer and recent divorcee Michael - could prove distracting. The pair's first run-in is far from romantic, but by the episode's end they're going to find it hard to keep out of each other's way. Aunty Brenda, meanwhile, is horrified to discover that her wayward daughter Verv is back from her travels. Someone who is glad to see her, however, is Yanto, or to use Verv's pet name for him, Doggy Man. Elsewhere in Pontyberry, Big Alan panics when his solicitor tells him to put Little Alan on a diet, and nerves jangle as Emma prepares for an interview at swanky hairdressing salon Jensen's. There's also a special two-for-one deal going on at the undertakers. First appearance of Michael Jackson and Cheryl
22	2	"Episode Two"	Sarah O'Gorman	Ruth Jones	31 January 2014	0.98
Neighbour Michael, on the other hand, is finding it hard to settle in, and a squabble with Stella over bin etiquette, not to mention the arrival of a donkey on the street, doesn't help. A couple of Pontyberry residents are looking to start afresh, too, and while Aunty Brenda means business when she organises a meeting with Dai, Big Alan follows doctors' orders and tries to lose weight. Plus, Bobby and Daddy find themselves burdened with too many bodies, and trouble looms for Zoe and Luke after Lenny gets back in contact. First appearance of Katie Jackson
23	3	"Episode Three"	Simon Massey	Robert Evans	7 February 2014	1.07
Frosty relations between Stella and Michael shows signs of thawing this week when she treats him for a bloody nose at the hospital, but it's back to trading insults after the lawyer stumbles upon an uninvited guest in his house. Emma, meanwhile, is looking forward to letting her hair down at the awards show, especially after receiving confirmation of her divorce to Sunil, and someone needs to give Luke a break - none the wise about Zoe's prison visit, he also misses out on a job on Brenda's buses. This episode includes a cameo by Nicky Clarke as himself. First appearance of Cecila
24	4	"Episode Four"	Simon Massey	Robert Evans	14 February 2014	1.14
White flags are raised this week as Stella calls a truce with Michael, going so far as to let him use her shower when his water runs out. The lawyer might think twice about accepting the offer again, though, following an incident involving a basketball and shattered glass. Daughter Emma, on the other hand, heads into dangerous territory, crossing the line with boss Marcus. Brenda's Buses make their maiden voyage, too, but with Brenda and Dai butting heads at every turn, surely it's only a matter of time before the business runs out of gas? Plus, jaws drop when Simpsons relaunches in an attempt to attract "classy stiffs", and Big Alan grows closer to the troubled Celia.
25	5	"Episode Five"	Ashley Way	Abigail Wilson	21 February 2014	1.04
Stella accidentally shuts Michael's hand in his car bonnet - thankfully the pair are still being pally at this point. Something is bound to happen between them, though, with Stella's raging hormones just about being kept at bay by a 50 Shades of Grey-style erotic novel. Later on, a girls' night out to the local nightclub to see TV presenter and one-time X Factor star Rylan spells trouble for young Emma when she continues to cross the line with the very married Marcus. On a brighter note, Big Alan asks Celia out for dinner, and Luke has a big question for Zoe. This episode includes a cameo by Rylan Clark as himself.
26	6	"Episode Six"	Ashley Way	Abigail Wilson	28 February 2014	1.18
Michael tells his smug ex-wife Jan that he has a date for the charity gala dinner... now all the lawyer needs to do is actually ask Stella.
27	7	"Episode Seven"	David Sant	Steve Speirs	7 March 2014	1.21
Although well-acquainted with Michael between the sheets, Stella starts to wonder how serious things really are between them.
28	8	"Episode Eight"	David Sant	Steve Speirs	14 March 2014	1.12
Ben is suspended from school. Luke, meanwhile, is let go by the police but can't escape the suspicions of those around him.
29	9	"Episode Nine"	Tony Dow	Ruth Jones	21 March 2014	1.07
Proud parents Luke and Zoe get the ball rolling on their wedding plans.
30	10	"Episode Ten"	Tony Dow	Ruth Jones and David Peet	28 March 2014	1.15
With a fresh start in Chichester on the cards, will Michael see the error of his ways before it's too late?

=== Christmas Special (2014) ===
No. overall	No. in series	Title	Directed by	Written by	Original release date	Viewers (millions)
31	–	"Christmas in Pontyberry"	Tony Dow	Ruth Jones and David Peet	22 December 2014	0.97
When Michael has to head home for Christmas, Stella throws herself into work on the hospital's children's ward. Last Appearance of Sunil Choudary and Tanisha Chaudary

=== Series 4 (2015) ===
No. overall	No. in series	Title	Directed by	Written by	Original release date	Viewers (millions)
32	1	"Episode One"	Ashley Way	Ben Edwards and Simon Ludders	6 February 2015	1.03
Just when you thought Stella's house couldn't possibly get more crowded, Michael decides to base the office for his go-it-alone solicitors' firm there.
33	2	"Episode Two"	Ashley Way	Ben Edwards and Simon Ludders	13 February 2015	1.00
Stella worries about Michael, who is acting out of character, while Aunty Brenda and the newly flush Dai lock horns during a fraught business meeting. First appearance of Beyonce
34	3	"Episode Three"	Simon Massey	Steve Speirs	20 February 2015	1.07
Trouble looms for Stella and Michael when the latter makes a monumental mistake. Big Alan, meanwhile meets his match, and Dai organises a poker game.
35	4	"Episode Four"	Simon Massey	Abigail Wilson	27 February 2015	1.00
Katie's small birthday lunch spirals out of control, culminating in a shock revelation for Stella. Pressure mounts on Luke to find some extra cash, too.
36	5	"Episode Five"	Tony Dow	Paul Rose	6 March 2015	0.98
Stella is ready to make amends with Michael, until, that is, she uncovers more secrets and lies. Elsewhere in Pontyberry, Dai Davies hits the campaign trail.
37	6	"Episode Six"	Tony Dow	Matt Barry and Kayleigh Llewellyn	13 March 2015	1.01
While Stella struggles to move on from Michael, Celia receives a blast from the past. Aunty Brenda's political campaign hits an unexpected snag, too.
38	7	"Episode Seven"	Ashley Way	Matt Evans	20 March 2015	1.06
Stella is overjoyed when sister-in-law and best friend Paula makes a surprise return to Pontyberry. Elsewhere, Big Alan worries about Celia and ex-husband Dan.
39	8	"Episode Eight"	Ashley Way	Ben Edwards and Simon Ludders	27 March 2015	0.84
Election day has arrived and Aunty Brenda can almost taste victory - until, that is, a new rival enters the race.
40	9	"Episode Nine"	Simon Delaney	Ruth Jones and Abigail Wilson	3 April 2015	0.88
Preparations for Big Alan and Celia's impending wedding day are in full swing.
41	10	"Episode Ten"	Simon Delaney	Steve Speirs	10 April 2015	0.92
Big Alan and Celia nail their fancy dress theme as they tie the knot in front of their nearest and dearest. Guest appearance by Gino D'Acampo as himself. Last Appearance of Big Alan and Dai Davies

=== Series 5 (2016) ===
No. overall	No. in series	Title	Directed by	Written by	Original release date	Viewers (millions)
42	1	"Episode One"	Simon Delaney	Ruth Jones	12 January 2016	1.06
Michael has been purposefully distancing himself from Beyonce until their baby is born, unaware that Stella has been trying to support her with lifts to the hospital for scans. Jag has now bought the local pub following his divorce, and unintentionally offends his new cleaner Carol. Newcomer to Pontyberry Ivan Schloss arrives to set up his new Undertaking business. Last Appearance of Celia
43	2	"Episode Two"	Simon Delaney	Unknown	19 January 2016	1.03
44	3	"Episode Three"	Simon Massey	Ruth Jones	26 January 2016	0.93
45	4	"Episode Four"	Simon Massey	Steve Speirs	2 February 2016	1.00
46	5	"Episode Five"	Ashley Way	Ben Edwards and Simon Ludders	9 February 2016	0.96
47	6	"Episode Six"	Ashley Way	Unknown	16 February 2016	0.84
Following their unexpected kiss, Ivan and Nadine do their best to keep out of each other's way. Following a false alarm at the hospital Stella calls in to Rob's cottage with Beyonce in tow, only for her to go into labour in Rob's front room. Beyonce decides to name the baby boy Jackson. Beyonce and Michael put their differences aside to share time with their new child. Back at Stella's house Paula Kosh leaves an answerphone message . Daddy Simpson has passed away in New Zealand, and his body is being flown back to Wales.
48	7	"Episode Seven"	Simon Delaney	Robert Evans	23 February 2016	1.05
The residents of Pontyberry gather for Daddy Simpson's funeral. Paula's emotions are thrown in to meltdown with the arrival of her hitherto unknown brother, whom Daddy fathered during his time as a circus performer. Whereas at first Paula rejects him, she comes to see him as a new part of her family and the two accept each other. Led Zeppelin's Robert Plant (and apparent friend of Daddy's) performs at the funeral. Cerys discovers videos on Ben's laptop that show that he has romantic feelings towards her,
49	8	"Episode Eight"	Simon Delaney	Ruth Jones and Steve Speirs	1 March 2016	1.05
It's Auntie Brenda's day of reckoning as she must face the town council and find out if she can keep her position as Mayor. After a surprising intervention by Clem, she gets to keep her job. Emma makes a surprise return to Pontyberry with her new 'Husband' Oak. Little Alan discovers that Ben has feeling for Cerys and the two clash at Ben's birthday party. This descends in to a food fight with all in attendance, and the two make up. Following Beyonce's poor parenting, Michael decides to push for custody of Jackson, however Beyonce causes a massive crisis for him by suggesting that he is not Jackson's father.
50	9	"Episode Nine"	Tony Dow	Ben Edwards and Simon Ludders	8 March 2016	0.93
Rob makes a last ditch attempt to rekindle his romance with Stella, even offering to return to Pontyberry permanently to be with her. Stella ultimately declines. She explains she will always love Rob, but her life now lies with Michael at her side. She also, quite astutely and correctly, sees Robs attentions as a way of comforting himself against the fear of his upcoming surgery. Ivan has been offered a job in Middlesbrough to work for a highly prestigious Undertaking firm, but struggles with the thought of never seeing Nadine again. Jasminder returns home unexpectedly and is less than enamored to find that her father Jag has begun a relationship with Carol. Stella proposes to Michael on his allotment, and he delightedly accepts.
51	10	"Episode Ten"	Tony Dow	Ruth Jones	15 March 2016	1.06
Stella and Michael have been trying to keep their engagement a secret, however news soon gets out. Rob heads off to surgery in London, and Beyonce, Keckers and Michael end up on a Welsh TV talk show to have a DNA test to prove Jackson's parentage. Michael is proved to be the father. Although Rob's surgery appeared to be successful he suffers a massive heart attack in the recovery room and dies in front of his devastated family. Weeks later at Stella and Michael's wedding, Stella interrupts her vows to tell Michael she is pregnant. Both are delighted. As the newly weds head off to Bali on honeymoon, Karl finds a Dear John letter from Nadine, who has left Pontyberry to live with Ivan in Middlesbrough.

=== Christmas Special (2016) ===
No. overall	No. in series	Title	Directed by	Written by	Original release date	Viewers (millions)
52	–	"Holly"	Tony Dow	Ben Edwards and Simon Ludders	23 December 2016	0.82
The first Christmas without Rob Morgan is proving tough on Luke who is keeping his feelings bottled up. Nadine returns to Pontyberry intent of reconciling with Karl. A representative from Pontyberry's twin town arrives and ends up staying with Auntie Brenda. Stella gives birth to a baby girl whom she and Michael name Holly. Karl tells Nadine that although they will remain friends he can no longer trust her following her affair with Ivan and they part company. Last Appearance of Karl Morris

=== Series 6 (2017) ===
No. overall	No. in series	Title	Directed by	Written by	Original release date	Viewers (millions)
53	1	"Episode One"	Tony Dow	Ruth Jones	13 September 2017	1.03
54	2	"Episode Two"	Tony Dow	Matt Barry and Kayleigh Llewellyn	20 September 2017	0.96
55	3	"Episode Three"	Simon Massey	Robert Evans	27 September 2017	0.88
56	4	"Episode Four"	Simon Massey	Robert Evans	4 October 2017	0.92
57	5	"Episode Five"	Simon Massey	Ruth Jones	11 October 2017	0.80
58	6	"Episode Six"	Tony Dow	Ruth Jones	18 October 2017	0.84
It's the day of Stella's graduation, but the mood is quite sombre. Stella and Michael are still at loggerheads and Aunty Brenda is a bundle of nerves ahead meeting her biological father Lord Lewellyn for the first time. Paula Kosh arrives to celebrate with Stella. Billy has been placed with a permanent foster family. When Aunty Brenda meets Lord Lewellyn he mistakenly confuses her attention as an attempt to extort money from him and repels her. She ultimately decides that this doesn't matter, and that the man who brought her up will always be her father. Following Stella's graduation she and Michael argue on the walk back to her party at the Frisky Fox. As the argument reaches boiling point, Stella steps out in the road distracted and is struck by a car driving at speed. As Stella lies in a coma, her friends and family, including a devastated Michael sit and pour their feelings out to her. In her deep Coma, Stella meets Rob Morgan on the Astral Plane. He confirms that he is dead, and explains that she is not, but that she is critically ill. Rob explains that being dead is fascinating as he know what will happen to the residents of Pontyberry in the future (For example Jackson grows up to be gay and becomes a Doctor and Rhian will have a major health scare and changes her ways). The pair visit friends and family, culminating at the hospital where Stella sees herself in intensive care with Michael exhausted at her side. Rob explains he is happy for Michael to be Holly's father and that he will be brilliant. He also explains to Stella that it is time for her to let him go. As Rob fades away, Stella wakes from her coma. Soon afterwards Stella returns home. All her friends and family welcome her in the street. At the top of the street, the ghost of Rob Morgan watches them, smiling before fading away one last time. Series Finale
