= Howell Evans =

Welsh actor, comedian and singer (1928–2014)

- Born: Howell Albert John Evans; 3 March 1928; Maesteg, Glamorgan, Wales
- Died: 9 September 2014 (aged 86)
- Occupations: Actor, comedian, singer
- Years active: 1964–2014
- Spouse: Patricia Kane (m. 1950)
- Children: 1

Howell Albert John Evans (3 March 1928 – 9 September 2014) was a Welsh actor, comedian, and singer who worked extensively in television and theatre roles in a career spanning over 60 years. He was best known for having played "Daddy" in the Sky1 TV comedy drama series Stella.

== Biography ==
He was born in Maesteg, and first performed as an impressionist during the Second World War. After the war, he joined the Carroll Levis Discovery Show, and formed a comedy double act with his wife, Patricia Kane, working together for many years in music hall, variety shows and pantomime. He later appeared in many television shows including Coronation Street, Casualty, Open All Hours, and The Story of Tracy Beaker.

== Personal life and death ==
Evans married actress Patricia Kane in 1950, with the marriage producing one child, a son, in 1953.

Evans died on 9 September 2014, aged 86.

== Filmography ==
Year	Title	Character	Production	Notes
2012–15	Stella	Daddy	Sky 1	Series 1, 2, 3 And 4
2012	Sadie J	Mr. Snodgrass	CBBC	
2006	Young Dracula	Atilla	CBBC	Series 1, Episode 8
2003–2004	The Story of Tracy Beaker	Grandpa Jack	CBBC	Series 3 And 4
2000	Coronation Street	Tegwin Thomas	ITV	
1995	The Englishman who Went up a Hill but Came down a Mountain	Thomas the Trains	Miramax Films and Parallax Pictures	
1989–1991	We Are Seven	William Price	ITV	
1967–69	Softly, Softly	DC Morgan/PC Thomas	BBC1	
1964	Crossroads	Dudley Scrivens	ITV	
