= Justin Davies (actor) =

Welsh actor

- Born: 1996 (age 29–30); Six Bells, Abertillery, Wales
- Occupation: Actor
- Years active: 2010–present
- Known for: Stella (2012–2017)

Justin Davies (born 1996) is a Welsh actor best known for playing Ben Morris in the Sky1 TV comedy drama series Stella He also made an appearance in the 2016 fantasy film 'Miss Peregrine's Home for Peculiar Children'.

== Filmography ==
=== Television ===
Year	Title	Role	Notes
2012– 2017	Stella	Ben Morris	

=== Film ===
Year	Title	Role	Notes
2016	Miss Peregrine's Home for Peculiar Children (film)	Worm	
