= Stella (British TV series) =

British television comedy-drama (2012–2017)

- Genre: Comedy-drama
- Created by: Ruth Jones; David Peet
- Written by: Rob Evans; Ruth Jones; Steve Speirs; David Peet; Ben Edwards; Simon Ludders; Matt Barry; Kayleigh Llewellyn
- Directed by: Tony Dow; Simon Massey
- Starring: Ruth Jones; Patrick Baladi; Elizabeth Berrington; Mark Lewis Jones; Kenny Doughty; Owen Teale; Craig Gallivan; Bethan Witcomb; Catrin Stewart; Justin Davies; Di Botcher
- Opening theme: And Then She Smiles by The Mock Turtles
- Composers: Simon H Jones; Mark Thomas
- Country of origin: United Kingdom
- Original language: English
- No. of series: 6 (plus 2 Christmas specials)
- No. of episodes: 58 (list of episodes)

Production
- Executive producers: Tilusha Ghelani; Ruth Jones; Jon Mountague; David Peet
- Producer: Spencer Campbell
- Editors: Peter Hallworth; Sara Jones; John Richards
- Running time: 60 minutes (inc. adverts); 90 minutes (inc. adverts) (2014 special & 2016 special); 70 minutes (inc. adverts) (Series finale)
- Production company: Tidy Productions

Original release
- Network: Sky One
- Release: 6 January 2012 – 18 October 2017

Stella is a British comedy-drama filmed in the Rhondda valleys that aired on Sky One from 2012 to 2017. It was created by David Peet and Ruth Jones. Jones plays the role of the titular character and appears alongside a cast ensemble which includes Patrick Baladi. The sixth and final series premiered on 13 September 2017 and concluded with a 70-minute finale on 18 October 2017. Various celebrities make guest cameos, with former Wales rugby union international Scott Quinnell making the most appearances.

== Plot ==
Stella focuses on the ups and downs in the life of a struggling mother of three living in the fictional Welsh town of Pontyberry, earning a living doing the laundry and ironing for the locals. Stella’s eldest son, Luke, is serving a prison sentence for joyriding; her daughter, Emma, is completely besotted with boyfriend Sunil and wants to leave school without doing her exams; and her youngest son, Ben, is working on his family tree, which brings back a familiar face from Stella’s past and sends shockwaves throughout the valley.

Along for the bumpy ride are Stella’s best friend Paula, a functioning alcoholic funeral director married to Stella’s brother Dai, an ex-serviceman injured on duty; Stella’s dim, but well-meaning ex-husband Karl, father to Emma and Ben and now with the much-younger Nadine; and lollipop man and youth rugby coach Alan, Stella’s old schoolfriend who has had unrequited love for her since their schooldays.

== Episodes ==
Series	Episodes	Originally released	
Series	Episodes	First released	Last released
1	10	6 January 2012	9 March 2012
2	10	11 January 2013	8 March 2013
3	10	24 January 2014	28 March 2014
Special (2014)		22 December 2014	
4	10	6 February 2015	10 April 2015
5	10	12 January 2016	15 March 2016
Special (2016)		23 December 2016	
6	6	13 September 2017	18 October 2017

== Cast ==
=== Key Cast ===
Actor/Actress	Character	Duration
Ruth Jones	Stella Jackson/Morris/Kosh	2012–2017
Patrick Baladi	Michael Jackson	2014–2017
Craig Gallivan	Luke Morris/Morgan	2012–2017
Catrin Stewart	Emma Morris	2012–2014, 2016, 2017
Justin Davies	Ben Morris	2012–2017
Di Botcher	Aunty Brenda Draper nee. Kosh	2013–2017
Bethan Witcomb	Zoe Stewart/Morgan	2013–2017
Julian Lewis Jones	Karl Morris	2012–2013, 2014, 2015–2016
Mark Lewis Jones	Rob Morgan	2012–2013, 2015, 2016, 2017
Elizabeth Berrington	Paula Kosh	2012–2013, 2015, 2016, 2017
Owen Teale	Dai Kosh	2012–2013
Maggie Steed	Meg Kosh	2012
Michael Elwyn	Ken Kosh	2012, 2017
Kenny Doughty	Sean McGaskill	2012–2013
Steve Speirs	Alan Williams	2012–2015

=== Supporting cast ===
Actor	Character	Duration
Karen Paullada	Nadine Bevan	2012–2017
Aled Pugh	Bobby Gittins	2012–2017
Piers Ahia	Billy Matthews	2014, 2017
Howell Evans	Daddy Simpson	2012–2015
Daniel Gammond	Little Alan Williams	2012–2017
Martha Mackintosh	Katie Jackson	2014–2016
Pal Aron	Jagadeesh Choudary	2012–2014, 2016–2017
Remy Beasley	Beyonce Evans	2015–2017
Tilly Blackwood	Jan	2014, 2017
Emma Rydal	Celia Brackstone/Williams	2014–2016
Clive Russell	Clem Draper	2016
Eiry Hughes	Vivienne ‘Verv’ Draper	2014
Sudha Bhuchar	Tanisha Choudary	2012–2014
Rory Girvan	Sunil Choudary	2012–2013, 2014
Taj Atwal	Jasminder Choudary	2012–2013, 2016
Yasmine Akram	Parvadi	2014–2015
Leena Dhingra	Nina Choudary	2016
Anthony O'Donnell	Dai Davies	2012–2017
Maxine Evans	Rhian Evans	2012–2017
Josh Cook	Keckers	2012, 2014–2017
Russell Gomer	Yanto Bead	2012–2017
Clare Hingott	Cheryl Spragg	2014–2017
Tony Gardner	Ivan Schloss	2016
Olwen Rees	Mrs Jones / Olwen Kosh	2014, 2017
Leona Vaughan	Cerys	2016, 2017
Frank Williams	Lord Stanley	2016–2017
James Thornton	Marcus Jensen	2014
Suzanne Packer	Carole	2016
Daniel Laurie	Jamie	2016
Joanna Scanlan	Nancy Crook	2012
Lucinda Dryzek	Leah	2013
Paul Kaye	Peschman Hodd	2013
Denise Gough	Collette Jensen	2014
Gillian Elisa	Nanna Pat	2015–2017
Jane Asher	Hazel	2015
Wayne Cater	George the Butcher	2013–2016
Beth Robert	Mrs Barclay	2012–2013
Dafydd Hywel	Glen Brennig	2012–2017
Deddie Davies	Marj Brennig	2012, 2014–2016
Scott Quinnell	Self	2013–2017
Michelle McTernan	PC Jane Glover	2012–2015, 2014
Ramon Tikaram	Mr Honey	2015
Grace Fan	Mrs Wong	2013–2016
Joanna Riding	Melissa	2013
Eiry Thomas	Lisa Howells	2012, 2013, 2016
Ifan Huw Dafydd	Idris Howells	2012, 2013, 2016
Celyn Jones	Brother ‘Alan Williams’	2014
Gareth Pierce	Lenny Mack	2013–2014
Katie Elin-Salt	Amy Edwards	2012, 2014
Nadia Kamil	Bethan	2012–2013
Mennar Trussler	Bopa Boyce	2012–2014
Patricia Kane	Mrs Collins / Dotty	2013, 2016
Donna Edwards	Mo The Bap	2012–2013
Jamie Lomas	Dan Brackstone	2015
Gruffudd Glyn	Tom	2014
Wayne Forrester	Barry	2014
Ian Hughes	Rhys	2014
Tom Price	Andy Marsh	2014
Alice Hewkin	Lily	2015
Robert Evans	Gwyn	2013–2014
Laila Rouass	Maria	2016
Richard Elfyn	Harris / Iwan Jenkins	2013, 2015
Andy Linden	Big Rae	2012–2013
James Corden	Steve	2012
Johnny Tudor	Evan	2013
Robbie Lester	Josh	2013
Glyn Pritchard	Trevor Mackie	2013
Steffan Rhodri	Leon	2013
Oliver Ryan	Darren	2013
Nathan Williams	Jacob Hillman	2013
Frank Honeybone	Frank the Barman	2013
Michelle Luther	Carley	2015
Dave Bond	Mr Palmer	2012–2013
Nicola Reynolds	Shelley Evans	2013, 2017
Lynn Hunter	Merna	2012
Royce Pierreson	Lee	2012
Euan Brown	Alex Rees	2012
Ian Lavender	Keith Jackson	2014
Eleanor Bron	Anna Jackson	2014

=== Special guests ===
Many celebrities appeared in the series as themselves:

- Ashley Banjo
- Joe Calzaghe
- Colin Charvis
- Keith Chegwin
- Rylan Clark-Neal
- Nicky Clarke
- Gino D'Acampo
- Andy Fairweather Low
- Warren Gatland
- Russell Grant
- Eamonn Holmes
- Colin Jackson
- Gethin Jones
- Neil Kinnock
- Debbie McGee
- Gillian McKeith
- Only Men Aloud
- Damien O'Kane
- Mike Phillips
- Robert Plant
- Graham Price
- Scott Quinnell
- Tim Rhys-Evans
- Jonathan Ross
- Kate Rusby
- Craig Bellamy
- Andrew Stone
- Gareth Thomas
- Shane Williams

== DVD releases ==
Season	Date released	Notes
The Complete Series 1	12 March 2012	
The Complete Series 2	18 March 2013	
The Complete Series 1–2	18 March 2013	
The Complete Series 3	31 March 2014	
The Complete Series 1–3	31 March 2014	
The Complete Series 4	20 April 2015	Includes 2014 Christmas special
The Complete Series 5	21 March 2016	
The Complete Series 1–5	21 March 2016	
The Complete Series 6	6 November 2017	Including 2016 Christmas special
The Complete Collection	6 November 2017	

== Filming ==
The series was largely filmed in Ferndale in the Rhondda Valley in Wales.
