= Miss Peregrine's Home for Peculiar Children (film) =

2016 fantasy film

- Theatrical release poster
- Directed by: Tim Burton
- Screenplay by: Jane Goldman
- Based on: Miss Peregrine's Home for Peculiar Children by Ransom Riggs
- Produced by: Peter Chernin; Jenno Topping
- Starring: Eva Green; Asa Butterfield; Chris O'Dowd; Allison Janney; Rupert Everett; Terence Stamp; Ella Purnell; Judi Dench; Samuel L. Jackson
- Cinematography: Bruno Delbonnel
- Edited by: Chris Lebenzon
- Music by: Mike Higham; Matthew Margeson
- Production companies: Chernin Entertainment; Tim Burton Productions; Scope Pictures; St. Petersburg Clearwater Film Commission; Ingenious
- Distributed by: 20th Century Fox
- Release dates: September 25, 2016 (Fantastic Fest); September 30, 2016 (United Kingdom and United States)
- Running time: 127 minutes
- Countries: United Kingdom; United States
- Language: English
- Budget: $110 million
- Box office: $318.2 million

Miss Peregrine's Home for Peculiar Children is a 2016 dark fantasy film directed by Tim Burton and written by Jane Goldman, based on the 2011 novel by Ransom Riggs. The film stars Eva Green, Asa Butterfield, Chris O'Dowd, Allison Janney, Rupert Everett, Terence Stamp, Ella Purnell, Judi Dench, and Samuel L. Jackson.

Filming began in February 2015 in London and the Tampa Bay Area. The film premiered at Fantastic Fest in Austin, Texas, on September 25, 2016, and was theatrically released in the United States on September 30, 2016, by 20th Century Fox. It received mixed reviews, with praise for Burton's direction and visual atmosphere, but criticism for its plot. Miss Peregrine's Home for Peculiar Children grossed $318 million worldwide against a production budget of $110 million.

== Plot ==
Abe Portman has told his grandson Jake stories about battling monsters and spending his childhood at "Miss Peregrine's Home for Peculiar Children" at Cairnholm, an island off the coast of Wales. The home's children and headmistress, Miss Alma Lefay Peregrine (named after the well-known bird of prey the peregrine falcon), possess paranormal abilities and are known as "Peculiars". One day, Jake finds Abe dying with his eyes removed. He tells him to go to "the loop of September 3, 1943".

To cope, Jake begins therapy with Dr. Golan. She encourages Jake's desire to travel to the United Kingdom for closure regarding his grandfather's death. On Cairnholm, Jake and his father, Frank, investigate the children's home. It was destroyed during a Luftwaffe raid, but upon entering the ruins Jake finds the children from Abe's stories.

The children take Jake through a portal on the island's coast, and emerge in 1943 with the house intact. Miss Peregrine explains she belongs to female Peculiars named Ymbryne who can transform into birds (in Miss Peregrine's case, a peregrine falcon) and manipulate time. To avoid persecution for being Peculiars, she and the children hide from the outside world in a time loop she created, set to September 3, 1943, and accessible only to Peculiars. It allows them to live the same day repeatedly and avoid aging as long as they stay inside it.

Jake meets the other children, including aerokinetic Emma Bloom. Jake is a Peculiar like his grandfather, and can see the invisible monsters from his stories, called "Hollowgasts" (or "Hollows"). They are disfigured Peculiar mad scientists who killed an Ymbryne in a failed experiment to attain immortality. Led by the shapeshifting Mr. Barron, they hunt Peculiars, primarily children, to consume their eyeballs. Mr. Barron and some of his colleagues consume enough eyeballs to become Wights, regaining a visibly human appearance apart from milky-white eyes.

Wounded Ymbryne Miss Avocet is found by Emma, as she escorts Jake back to the entrance to his time. After being nursed back to health, Avocet explains that Barron attacked her Children's Home in the January 2016 time loop at Blackpool, England, killed the children, and plans to repeat the earlier failed experiment using more Ymbrynes. Back in 2016 Jake is being closely monitored by his worried father, but after they find an elderly man who has been evidently killed by a Hollow, Jakes escapes to get back through the portal to warn the Miss Peregrine, however he is followed by an ornithologist who is actually Mr. Barron in disguise.

Barron explains that he tried to extract the location of Miss Peregrine's loop from Abe, but his hungry Hollow companion Malthus killed Abe before he could do so. He then posed as Dr. Golan, encouraging Jake to go to the island so he could lead him to the loop. Now taking Jake as a hostage, Barron forces Miss Peregrine to trap herself in bird form and takes her to Blackpool, leaving Jake, the other children, and Miss Avocet as prey for Malthus and the other Hollows.

Malthus kills Miss Avocet, but Jake and the children escape just as the Luftwaffe raid destroys the house, killing Malthus. Without Miss Peregrine to reset it, the loop closes, leaving them stuck in 1943. Salvaging a sunken ocean liner, RMS Augusta, that Emma has used as a personal hideout, they travel to Blackpool and enter its January 2016 loop. They fight and destroy Barron's Wight and Hollow allies, and rescue Miss Peregrine and other captive Ymbrynes. When the last remaining Hollow arrives, it kills Barron who is posing as Jake, before being killed by the real Jake.

Jake says goodbye to the children in 1943, he is especially reluctant to leave Emma, who assures him he must return as he loves his grandfather Abe. Back in 2016, Jake finds Abe, still alive as Barron's death in early 2016 had erased his later presence in Florida. After telling Abe his adventures, Abe suggests that Jake go to Emma and the others, giving him the ability to find them with his personal map of international time-loops. Jake reunites with his friends in 1943 on board the docked ship, telling Emma how he managed to get back via several portals across the world, including 2 years service in World War II. The ship departs as Jake, Emma, Miss Peregrine and the children journey to seek a happy time loop.

== Cast ==
=== Peculiars ===
==== Peculiar adults ====
- Eva Green as Miss Alma LeFay Peregrine, the strict but clever and caring Ymbryne headmistress of Miss Peregrine's Home for Peculiar Children on Cairnholm. She can transform into a peregrine falcon and manipulate time.
- Terence Stamp as Abe Portman, Jake's grandfather who can see the invisible Hollows
  - Callum Wilson as young Abe
- Judi Dench as Miss Esmeralda Avocet, the Ymbryne headmistress of another shelter for Peculiar Children in Blackpool. Like Miss Peregrine, Miss Avocet can manipulate time; she can transform into an avocet.

==== Peculiar children ====
- Asa Butterfield as Jake Portman, a 16-year-old American teenager and Abe's grandson. He visits Miss Peregrine's Home for Peculiar Children and is given, by Miss Peregrine, the task/promise of protecting the children. Like his grandfather, Jake can see Hollows.
  - Butterfield also portrays Mr. Barron's disguise as Jake
  - Aiden Flowers as 10-year-old Jacob
  - Nicholas Oteri as 6-year-old Jake
- Ella Purnell as Emma Bloom, an aerokinetic teenager who can manipulate air and can breathe under water by creating liquid bubbles of air. She is lighter than air and must always wear lead shoes or a tether to keep from floating away. Emma is also Abe's former love interest in the 1940s and Jake's current love interest.
- Finlay MacMillan as Enoch O'Connor, a teenager and Olive's love interest who can reanimate the dead and bring inanimate objects to life as his living puppets for a limited time by placing a heart inside them.
- Lauren McCrostie as Olive Abroholos Elephanta, a pyrokinetic red-haired teenager and Enoch's love interest. She has to wear special black gloves to prevent her from burning everything she touches.
- Cameron King as the voice and motion-capture of Millard Nullings, an invisible boy
- Pixie Davies as Bronwyn Bruntley, a young girl with superhuman strength, Victor's sister
- Georgia Pemberton as Fiona Frauenfeld, a young girl who can control and maintain plants including the vegetables in Miss Peregrine's garden
- Milo Parker as Hugh Apiston, a boy with bees living in his stomach
- Raffiella Chapman as Claire Densmore, a young girl with an additional mouth hidden in the back of her head
- Hayden Keeler-Stone as Horace Somnusson, a boy who can project his dreams (which are sometimes prophetic) through a monocle
- Joseph and Thomas Odwell as the Twins, two masked gorgon-like twin boys who turn anyone who sees them into stone. They normally wear hoods to hide their faces.
- Louis Davison as Victor Bruntley, Bronwyn's late brother who had the same ability as her. He was killed by a Hollow infiltrator prior to the events in the film, and was briefly brought back to life by Enoch.

==== Wights and Hollows ====
- Samuel L. Jackson as Mr. Frederick "Fred" Barron, the shapeshifting leader of the Wights and Hollows. Barron and his Wight and Hollow minions hunt Peculiars and devour their eyes to recover human form. Barron believes this makes him invincible. His shape-shifting peculiarity allows him to disguise himself as another person. When he uses his peculiarity to become a person who does not exist, his white eyes do not change, so he has to wear contact lenses. He can also form blades, axes, and lassos with his hands.
  - Allison Janney as Dr. Nancy Golan, Jake's psychiatrist and one of Mr. Barron's disguised forms
  - Rupert Everett as John Lamont (credited as "Ornithologist"), an ornithologist and another of Mr. Barron's disguised forms
- Scott Handy as Mr. Andrew Gleeson, a cryokinetic Wight
- Helen Day as Miss Jessica Edwards, a half-simian Wight with great agility, dexterity and mobility
- Jack Brady as Mr. David Clark, a Wight
- Philip Philmar as Mr. Jack Archer, a Wight
- Robert Milton Wallace as Mr. Kevin Malthus, a Hollow

=== Non-Peculiars ===
- Chris O'Dowd as Franklin "Frank" Portman, Jake's father and Abe's son
- Kim Dickens as Maryann Portman (credited as "Jake's Mom"), Jake's mother and an up-and-coming businesswoman
- O-Lan Jones as Shelly, Jake's drugstore supervisor and co-worker
- Jennifer Jarackas as Susie Portman, Frank's sister and Jake's aunt. She passes Jake her late father's gift which gives him the way to find Miss Peregrine's time loop.
- George Vricos as Bobby, Judy's husband and Jake's uncle
- Brooke Jaye Taylor as Judy, Bobby's wife and Jake's other aunt
- Ioan Hefin as Kev, the bartender on Cairnholm in the present day
- Nicholas Amer as Oggie, a blind and elderly present-day resident of Cairnholm
- Shaun Thomas and Justin Davies as Dylan and Worm, two present-day teenage Welsh residents whom Jake meets in Cairnholm

Director Tim Burton makes a cameo appearance in the film as a visitor at the fun fair in Blackpool who gets a skeleton thrown at him by a Hollow. Glen Mexted, who previously worked with Burton as an extra in both Dark Shadows and the music video for the Killers' "Here with Me", also appears in the same scene as a customer eating ice cream.

== Production ==
The film rights to the 2011 novel Miss Peregrine's Home for Peculiar Children by Ransom Riggs were sold to 20th Century Fox in May of that year. In November, Deadline Hollywood reported that Tim Burton was in talks to direct and would also be involved in selecting a writer. On December 2, Jane Goldman was reportedly hired to adapt the story as a screenplay for the film.

On July 28, 2014, Eva Green was set to play Miss Peregrine in the film; Mischa Barton, Lucy Hale and Alison Sudol were also considered. On September 24, 2014, it was announced that Asa Butterfield was being eyed for the second lead role as Burton's choice, but that at that time he had not yet been offered the role. On November 5, 2014, Ella Purnell was offered a role and was in final talks to join the film; it was also reported that Butterfield had been offered the male lead role, and was the favored choice. On February 6, 2015, Samuel L. Jackson was added to the cast to play Mr. Barron, while Butterfield was confirmed for the second lead role. Terence Stamp, Chris O'Dowd, Rupert Everett, Kim Dickens, and Judi Dench were announced as being in the cast on March 12, 2015.

Filming was initially set to begin in August 2014 in London. Principal photography on the film began on February 24, 2015, in the Tampa Bay Area. Filming lasted for two weeks in Hillsborough and Pinellas counties in Florida. It is the second Tim Burton film to be shot in the Tampa Bay area, the first being Edward Scissorhands, in 1990. Production of the film later moved to Caerhays Castle and Minions in Cornwall, and Blackpool in the United Kingdom, and Brasschaat, a municipality close to Antwerp, Belgium. Filming also took place at Pinewood Studios.

== Music ==
The film's score was composed by Mike Higham and Matthew Margeson. The soundtrack was released on October 11, 2016, by La-La Land Records and Fox Music. Florence and the Machine recorded the film's end credits song, "Wish That You Were Here".

== Release ==
Miss Peregrine's Home for Peculiar Children was originally set for a release date of July 31, 2015. The release date moved to March 4, 2016, then again to December 25, 2016, before finally moving to September 30, 2016.

=== Home media ===
20th Century Fox Home Entertainment released Miss Peregrine's Home for Peculiar Children on DVD, Blu-ray, Blu-ray 3D and Ultra HD Blu-ray on December 13, 2016.

== Reception ==
=== Box office ===
Miss Peregrine's Home for Peculiar Children grossed $100.6 million in the United States and Canada and $217.5 million in other territories for a worldwide total of $318.2 million, against a production budget of $110 million.

In the United States and Canada, the film opened alongside Deepwater Horizon and Masterminds as well as the wide expansion of Queen of Katwe, and was projected to gross around $25 million from 3,522 theaters in its opening weekend. In total, the film earned $28.9 million during its opening weekend, finishing first at the box office. The opening was on par with Dark Shadows' $29.7 million in 2012, Burton's last big budgeted film. Variety called it "a mediocre start" given the film's $110 million budget.

It had number one openings in Russia ($6.3 million), France ($5.3 million), Mexico ($3.8 million), Australia ($3.1 million), Brazil ($2.7 million) and the Philippines ($1.7 million) and the biggest opening for Burton in Malaysia and Indonesia. In South Korea, it debuted at number two with $5.2 million. The film was released in China and Italy in December 2016 and Japan in February 2017.

=== Critical response ===
On Rotten Tomatoes, the film has an approval rating of 65% based on 259 reviews, with an average rating of 5.9/10. The website's critical consensus reads, "Miss Peregrine's Home for Peculiar Children proves a suitable match for Tim Burton's distinctive style, even if it's on stronger footing as a visual experience than a narrative one." On Metacritic, the film has a weighted average score of 57 out of 100 based on 43 critics, indicating "mixed or average reviews". Audiences polled by CinemaScore gave the film an average grade of "B+" on an A+ to F scale.

IGN critic Samantha Ladwig gave the film a 7.2/10, summarizing her review with: "Though there are lingering questions about certain characters by the time the end credits roll, the film's striking visuals help compensate for its unemotional and anti-climactic script." Justin Chang of Los Angeles Times wrote "Easily the director's finest work since his masterful 2007 screen adaptation of Sweeney Todd, and a striking reminder of what an unfettered gothic imagination can achieve with the right focus and an infusion of discipline." USA Today's Brian Truitt gave the film 3.5 out of 4 and wrote, "After a long run of dystopian YA movies for teen crowds, Burton is just the right guy to make cinema weird again." Calvin Wilson of St. Louis Post-Dispatch gave the film 3.5 out of 4 and stated, "Burton delivers his most ambitious and engaging film since Sweeney Todd (2007). Although the story becomes increasingly complex as it goes along, the emotional payoff is more than worth it."

Michael O'Sullivan of The Washington Post gave the film 3 out of 4 and wrote "The very idea of this – at once gruesome and darkly funny — is perfectly suited to Burton's sensibility, which also reveals itself in the casting of Butterfield, who has the quality of a young, slightly less freaky Johnny Depp." The Guardian's Jordan Hoffman gave the film 4 out of 5 and said, "We get the playfulness of seeing quirky magic powers mixed with the familiarity of how a time loop plays out. Add in Burton's authorial visual stamp and what we've got is an extremely pleasing formula. It gels as Tim Burton's best (non-musical) live-action movie for 20 years." James Berardinelli from ReelViews gave the film 3 out of 4 and stated, "Overall, despite feeling a little long and suffering from a rushed ending, Miss Peregrine's Home for Peculiar Children is a fresh and engaging storybook adventure that should appeal to viewers both inside and out of the core demographic." The New York Times' Manohla Dargis gave a positive review, writing: "The story gets awfully busy — you may get lost in 1943 or perhaps closer to the present — but it scarcely matters. Mr. Burton's attention to detail and to the ebb and flow of tone (scary, funny, eerie), as well as his sensitive, gentle work particularly with the child actors, make each new turn another occasion for unfettered imagination." Devan Coggan from Entertainment Weekly gave the film "B−" (67/100), with describing the film "The film chooses style over substance, emphasizing how cool the children's powers are without fleshing them out as full characters. To compete with Burton's best, his heroic weirdos need a little more heart — and the monsters need sharper teeth."

Richard Roeper, who scored the film 1.5 stars out of 4, began his review by writing: "I'm wondering if the mutant kids at Miss Peregrine's Home for Peculiar Children ever play basketball against their rivals across the pond, Xavier's School for Gifted Youngsters. I'd watch that. I'd certainly rather watch that than Tim Burton's adaptation of the popular children's book about a school for freakishly gifted children. This is a messy, confusing, uninvolving mishmash of old-school practical effects and CGI battles that feels ... off nearly every misstep of the way. Tom Huddleston of Time Out gave the film 2 stars out of 5, writing: "Director Tim Burton likes his films busy: watch a classic like Beetlejuice or Batman, and you'll be pushed to find a single frame that isn't packed with background detail, weird creatures, ornate furnishings and intricate costumes. The problem with his new film, Miss Peregrine's Home for Peculiar Children, is that the script is every bit as busy and it can get pretty confusing."

=== Accolades ===
Award	Date of ceremony	Category	Nominee(s)	Results	Ref.
Costume Designers Guild	February 21, 2017	Excellence in Fantasy Film	Colleen Atwood	Nominated	
Globes de Cristal Awards	January 30, 2017	Best Foreign Film	Tim Burton	Nominated	
Hollywood Music in Media Awards	November 17, 2016	Best Original Song – Sci-Fi/Fantasy Film	"Wish That You Were Here" – Florence and the Machine	Nominated	
People's Choice Awards	January 18, 2017	Favorite Dramatic Movie	Miss Peregrine's Home for Peculiar Children	Nominated	
Saturn Awards	June 28, 2017	Best Fantasy Film	Miss Peregrine's Home for Peculiar Children	Nominated	
Teen Choice Awards	August 13, 2017	Choice Fantasy Movie	Miss Peregrine's Home for Peculiar Children	Nominated	
Teen Choice Awards	August 13, 2017	Choice Fantasy Movie Actor	Asa Butterfield	Nominated	
Teen Choice Awards	August 13, 2017	Choice Fantasy Movie Actress	Eva Green	Nominated	
Visual Effects Society Awards	February 7, 2017	Outstanding Visual Effects in a Photoreal Feature	Jelmer Boskma, Frazer Churchill, Hal Couzens, Andrew Lockley and Hayley Williams	Nominated	
Women Film Critics Circle	December 19, 2016	Best Family Film	Miss Peregrine's Home for Peculiar Children	Nominated	

== See also ==
- List of films featuring time loops
