= Snow White & the Huntsman (soundtrack) =

Snow White and the Huntsman (Original Motion Picture Soundtrack)

Soundtrack album by James Newton Howard
- Released: May 29, 2012
- Recorded: January–April 2012
- Genre: Film score; orchestral
- Length: 67:06
- Label: Universal Republic
- Director: James Newton Howard

James Newton Howard chronology
The Hunger Games (2012)	Snow White and the Huntsman (2012)	The Bourne Legacy (2012)

Singles from Snow White and the Huntsman (Original Motion Picture Soundtrack)
- 1. "Breath of Life" Released: April 26, 2012

Snow White and the Huntsman (Original Motion Picture Soundtrack) is the soundtrack to the 2012 film Snow White and the Huntsman directed by Rupert Sanders. The film's original score is composed by James Newton Howard, who recorded the score at the Sony Scoring Stage in Culver City, California. The album was released by Universal Republic Records on May 29, 2012, featured 19 tracks.

Along with Howard's score accompanying most of the album, it features an original song "Breath of Life" performed by the English rock band Florence and the Machine; released as the lead single from the album by Island Records on April 26, 2012 through iTunes, with a music video released on May 14. Ioanna Gika of Io Echo performed "Gone" that was released along with the album. The score received positive critical response from music critics.

== Track listing ==
Snow White and the Huntsman (Original Motion Picture Soundtrack)
No.	Title	Performer(s)	Length
1.	"Snow White"		3:24
2.	"I'll Take Your Throne"		2:00
3.	"Tower Prayers"		2:07
4.	"Something of What Ails You"		3:25
5.	"Escape From the Tower"		2:33
6.	"You Failed Me Finn"		3:02
7.	"White Horse"		2:02
8.	"Journey to Fenland"		3:38
9.	"Fenland in Flames"		4:08
10.	"Sanctuary"		2:33
11.	"White Hart"		6:37
12.	"Gone"	Ioanna Gika	3:09
13.	"I Remember That Trick"		5:35
14.	"Death Favors No Man"		6:12
15.	"Warriors on the Beach"		4:52
16.	"You Cannot Defeat Me"		2:35
17.	"You Can't Have My Heart"		1:57
18.	"Coronation"		2:06
19.	"Breath of Life"	Florence and the Machine	4:09
Total length:			1:07:00

== Reception ==
James Southall of Movie Wave wrote "The score's most impressive moments come in the expressive beauty of the cello solos, which are sadly few and far between. The action music is decent if unspectacular, pushing the right buttons without offering anything we haven't heard before. That's essentially the score, in a nutshell – it's not bad by any means, but it's rarely as good as the other scores by the composer it so closely resembles." He concluded the review saying "Fans of the composer are sure to enjoy it; the wider audience will have a harder time." Filmtracks.com wrote "there is much to like about this work, but as with the inferior Hunger Games the same year, Howard doesn't pull it together into one gloriously transcendent package as he has done before. His devoted enthusiasts will likely disagree, but these two summer blockbuster scores from Howard in 2012 do not come close to reaching the heights achieved by Lady in the Water and The Last Airbender, and unlike The Village, The Water Horse: Legend of the Deep, and other very strong efforts from the veteran, this work doesn't even feature (outside of a minute in "Sanctuary") one of those fantastic interludes of irresistible beauty that alone floats the whole endeavor. Be prepared to hear technical precision in theme and instrumentation, as well as a solid soundscape for the topic, but temper your expectations otherwise."

Todd McCarthy of The Hollywood Reporter wrote "James Newton Howard has composed an unusually somber and nuanced full orchestral score that helpfully amplifies the story's dark moods and currents". Max Nicholson of IGN called the score as "powerful". A. O. Scott of The New York Times commented "James Newton Howard's score roars and howls like Wagner with a stubbed toe".

== Accolades ==
Howard's score was longlisted for Best Original Score at the 85th Academy Awards along with 104 contenders, which include his scores for The Hunger Games and The Bourne Legacy. Neither of them received a nomination. Similarly, "Breath of Life" was shortlisted for Best Original Song among 75 contenders for the Academy Awards as well as in the 70th Golden Globe Awards, failing to receive a nomination. The song received a nomination at the World Soundtrack Awards for Best Original Song Written Directly for a Film, losing to Adele's "Skyfall".

== Personnel ==
Credits adapted from CD liner notes.

- Composer – James Newton Howard
- Producer – James Newton Howard, Stuart Thomas
- Co-producer – Jim Weidman
- Executive producer – Joe Roth
- Programming – Stuart Thomas, Sven Faulconer
- Recording – Shawn Murphy, Matt Ward
- Mixing – Shawn Murphy
- Mastering – Patricia Sullivan
- Score editor – David Channing
- Music supervisor – Rachel Levy
- Music co-ordinator – Pamela Sollie
- Packaging – Olivia Smith

Orchestra

- Orchestration – Jeff Atmajian, James Newton Howard, John Ashton Thomas, Jon Kull, Marcus Trumpp, Pete Anthony
- Conductor – Pete Anthony
- Orchestra leader – Belinda Broughton

Choir

- Choir – London Voices
- Choirmaster – Ben Parry, Terry Edwards
- Choir contractor – Isobel Griffiths, Jo Buckley
- Recording – Peter Cobbin
- Alto vocals – Amanda Dean, Caroline Stormer, Cathy Bell, Claire Henry, Clara Kanter, Clara Sanabras, Clemmie Franks, Deryn Edwards, Freya Jacklin, Heather Cairncross, Helen Brooks, Helen Templeton, Jo Marshall, Judy Rees, Lucy Goddard, Martha McLorinan, Polly May, Susan Marrs, Tamsin Dalley, Vanessa Heine
- Bass vocals – Andian Horsewood, Alain Judd, Brian Etheridge, Don Greig, Gareth Dayus Jones, Jeremy Birchall, Jeremy Sadler, Lawrence Wallington, Mark Williams, Martin Nelson, Michael Dore, Neil Bellingham, Nigel Short, Patrick Ardagh Walter, Peter Snipp, Richard Arundel, Richard Fallas, Simon Grant, Simon Preece, Simon Whiteley
- Soprano vocals – Ali Hill, Ann De Renais, Carys Lloyd Roberts, Christina Sampson, Elin Manahan, Grace Davidson, Helen Ashby, Ildiko Allen, Jackie Barron, Jassy Husk, Jo Forbes, Kate Ashby, Kathy Jenkin, Katie Hill, Mary Carewe, Natalie Clifton Griffith, Philippa Murray, Prudence Sanders, Rachel Major, Robyn Parton, Rosalind Waters, Ruth Kerr, Sophie Jones, Tara Bungard, Wendy Nieper
- Tenor vocals – Alastair Putt, Alex Cadden, Andrew Busher, Andrew Friedhoff, Andrew Walters, Ashley Turnell, David Del Strother, Dominic Bland, Henry Moss, Jeremy Budd, Julian Alexander Smith, Matthew Minter, Nicholas Wilson, Nicholas Keay, Norbert Meyn, Philip Sheffield, Phillip Brown, Richard Eteson, Simon Davies
- Vocal soloist – Clara Sanabras

Instruments

- Bass – Bruce Morgenthaler, Chris Kollgaard, David Parmeter, Drew Dembowski, Edward Meares, Mike Valerio, Nico Abondolo, Oscar Hidalgo, Steve Dress
- Bassoon – Ken Munday, Michael O'Donovan
- Cello – Andrew Shulman, Tony Cooke, Armen Ksajikian, Cecilia Tsan, Chris Ermaco, David Speltz, Dennis Karmazyn, Erika Duke, Kim Scholes, John Walz, Paula Hochhalter, Steve Erdody, Tim Landauer, Trevor Handy, Maya Beiser, Andrew Shulman
- Clarinet – Ben Lulich, Stuart Clark
- Flute – Geri Rotella, Heather Clark
- Harp – Gayle Levant, Marcia Dickstein
- Horn – Daniel Kelley, Dave Everson, Jim Thatcher, Jenny Kim, Mark Adams, Phil Yao, Steve Becknell
- Oboe – Jessica Pearlman, Leslie Reed
- Percussion – Alan Estes, Bob Zimmitti, Greg Goodall, Peter Limonick, Wade Culbreath
- Piano – Randy Kerber
- Trombone – Alex Iles, Andy Malloy, Bill Reichenbach, Mike Hoffman, Phil Teele, Steve Suminski, Steve Holtman, Bill Booth
- Trumpet – Barry Perkins, David Washburn, Jon Lewis, Malcolm McNab, Warren Luening
- Tuba – Doug Tornquist, Jim Self
- Viola – Alma Hernandez, Andrew Duckles, Andrew Picken, Brian Dembow, Carolyn Riley, Darrin McCann, David Walther, Jennie Hansen, Keith Greene, Luke Maurer, Lynne Richburg, Matt Funes, Mike Nowak, Rob Brophy, Roland Kato, Shawn Mann, Thomas Diener, Vicki Miskolczy
- Violin – Aimee Kreston, Alyssa Park, Amy Hershberger, Ana Landauer, Anatoly Rosinsky, Bruce Dukov, Dimitrie Leivici, Endre Granat, Eun-Mee Ahn, Haim Shtrum, Helen Nightengale, Irina Voloshina, Jackie Brand, Jay Rosen, Jeanne Skrocki, Jessica Guideri, Jose, Ina Vergara, Julie Gigante, Katia Popov, Lisa Sutton, Lorand Lokuszta, Lorenz Gamma, Marc Sazer, Maya Magub, Miwako Watanabe, Natalie Leggett, Phillip Levy, Radu Pieptea, Rafael Rishik, Roberto Cani, Roger Wilkie, Sara Parkins, Sarah Thornblade, Serena McKinney, Shalini Vijayan, Tammy Hatwan, Tereza Stanislav, Belinda Broughton
