= The Bourne Legacy (soundtrack) =

The Bourne Legacy: Original Motion Picture Soundtrack

Film score by James Newton Howard
- Released: August 7, 2012
- Recorded: 2012
- Studios: Abbey Road Studios, London
- Genre: Film score
- Length: 63:34
- Labels: Back Lot Music; Varèse Sarabande
- Producer: James Newton Howard

James Newton Howard chronology
Snow White & the Huntsman	The Bourne Legacy: Original Motion Picture Soundtrack	After Earth

The Bourne Legacy: Original Motion Picture Soundtrack is the soundtrack to the 2012 film The Bourne Legacy, which is the fourth installment in the series of films adapted from the Jason Bourne novels by Robert Ludlum and Eric Van Lustbader. The musical score is composed by James Newton Howard, becoming the first film in the series not to be composed by John Powell, who provided music for previous Bourne installments, due to his interest in scoring animated films. It was conducted by Pete Anthony returning as conductor from the first two Bourne installments, and performed by the Hollywood Studio Symphony.

The album was digitally released through Back Lot Music on August 7, 2012, and a physical release by Varèse Sarabande on August 21, 2012. The album featured a new version of Moby's "Extreme Ways" subtitled with "Bourne's Legacy" released as a single on July 31. The music received mixed critical response.

== Track listing ==
No.	Title	Artist(s)	Length
1.	"Legacy"		2:40
2.	"Drone"		4:15
3.	"NRAG"		0:59
4.	"You Fell In Love"		1:42
5.	"Program Shutdown"		3:00
6.	"Over The Mountain"		0:51
7.	"High Powered Rifle"		2:50
8.	"They're All Dead"		2:48
9.	"Manila Lab"		2:40
10.	"Wolves / Sick Ric"		2:19
11.	"Doctor Of What?"		4:28
12.	"Aaron In Chicago"		1:32
13.	"Wolf Attack"		2:57
14.	"Chem Talk"		1:35
15.	"Flight 167"		3:30
16.	"Aaron Run!"		1:08
17.	"You Belong Here"		1:17
18.	"Cognitive Degrade"		2:49
19.	"17 Hour Head Start"		3:51
20.	"Viralled Out"		0:58
21.	"You're Doing Fine"		1:18
22.	"Simon Ross"		1:37
23.	"LARX Tarmac"		1:45
24.	"Magsaysay Suite"		3:04
25.	"Aftermath"		2:49
26.	"Extreme Ways (Bourne's Legacy)"	Moby	4:51
Total length:			63:33

== Reception ==
Professional ratings
Review scores
Source	Rating
AllMusic	3/5 stars
Empire	3/5 stars
Film Score Reviews	2.5/5 stars
Filmtracks	2/5 stars
Movie Wave	2/5 stars
Tracksounds	5/10 stars

The soundtrack received mixed reviews, with Danny Graydon of Empire gave a mixed review saying "Howard efficiently maintains Bourne's music, but doesn't significantly progress it", while Brad Kamminga of Film Score Reviews criticised it as "dull and unmemorable". Edmund Meinerts of Tracksounds also wrote "For being basically competent and containing few outright unpleasant or unlistenable moments, The Bourne Legacy scrapes a five out of ten, but when one of the year's dullest score albums comes from an action-packed thriller, you know something has gone wrong." Filmtracks.com also gave a negative review, commenting "The score is competent in each of its parts, but it concentrates more on respecting its predecessors than taking the opportunity to explore potentially convincing new avenues with that basic sound." James Southall of Movie Wave wrote "even those sections are reasonably elaborate in the way they're constructed – it's easy to tell how much effort has gone into it – but it just never quite all comes together and too much of it is just boring".

In contrast, James Christopher Monger of AllMusic wrote "The resulting score for The Bourne Legacy is as relentlessly taut as it is atmospheric, expertly doling out layer after layer of chilly electronics, thundering kettle drums, and dissonant strings, before careening feet-first into the familiar opening strains of Moby's "Extreme Ways," which appears here in a slightly updated form". Brent Simon of Screen International wrote "Nicely incorporating different percussive elements, Newton Howard's score captures the film's nervous energy". Richard Propes of The Independent Critic commented "James Newton Howard's original music is fine, though a bit more cliche'd than one might expect from the acclaimed composer".

== Accolades ==
Howard received a World Soundtrack Awards nomination for Film Composer of the Year losing to Mychael Danna for Life of Pi. He was longlisted for Best Original Score at the 85th Academy Awards along with 104 contenders, this include his scores for The Hunger Games and Snow White and the Huntsman, but failed to receive a nomination.

== Credits ==
Credits adapted from CD liner notes.

- Composer and producer – James Newton Howard
- Producer – James Newton Howard
- Co-producer – Nic Ratner, Sven Faulconer
- Arrangements – Stuart Thomas, Sven Faulconer
- Programming – Alex Kharlamov, Matt Ward, Rob Persaud, Stuart Thomas, Sven Faulconer
- Recording – Shawn Murphy, Matt Ward, Erik Swanson, Larry Mah
- Mixing – Shawn Murphy, Edward Cherney
- Mastering – Patricia Sullivan
- Score editor – Nic Ratner, Katherine Miller
- Music editor – David Channing
- Sound designer – Joe Trapanese, Mel Wesson, Clay Duncan
- Music supervisor – Rachel Levy
- Technician – Richard Grant
- Music co-ordinator – Pamela Sollie
- Copyist – JoAnn Kane Music Service
- Scoring crew – Adam Michalak, Dante Reynolds, David Marquette, Greg Loskorn, Mark Eshelman
- Executive producer – Tony Gilroy
- Musical assistance – Christopher Wray
- Music advisor – Sunna Wehrmeijer
- Music librarian– Mark Graham
- Executive in charge of music – Mike Knobloch
- Music business affairs – Philip M. Cohen

Orchestra

- Performer – The Hollywood Studio Symphony
- Orchestration – Jeff Atmajian, John Ashton Thomas, Jon Kull, Pete Anthony
- Orchestra leader and concertmaster – Belinda Broughton
- Conductor – Blake Neely, Pete Anthony
- Contractor – De Crescent Zimmitti Music Contracting

Instruments

- Bass – Bruce Morgenthaler, Drew Dembowski, Ed Meares, Nico Abondolo, Oscar Hidalgo, Mike Valerio
- Bassoon – Michael O'Donovan
- Cello – Tony Cooke, Armen Ksajikian, Cecilia Tsan, Chris Ermacoff, Dane Little, David Speltz, Dennis Karmazyn, Giovanna Clayton, Paula Hochhalter, Steve Erdody, Tim Landauer, Andrew Shulman
- Clarinet – Don Foster, Stuart Clark
- Flute – Heather Clark, Geri Rotella
- French Horn – Daniel Kelley, Dave Everson, Mark Adams, Phil Yao, Steve Becknell, Jim Thatcher
- Guitar – Marc Bonilla, Michael Landau
- Harp – Gayle Levant
- Oboe – Lara Wickes
- Percussion – Alan Estes, Brad Dutz, Brian Kilgore, M.B. Gordy, Bob Zimmitti
- Piano – Randy Kerber
- Timpani – Peter Limonick
- Trombone – Andy Malloy, Bill Reichenbach, Steve Holtman, Bill Booth
- Trumpet – Jon Lewis, Marissa Benedict, Malcolm McNab
- Tuba – Jim Self
- Viola – Andrew Duckles, Darrin McCann, David Walther, Keith Greene, Luke Maurer, Lynne Richburg, Marlow Fisher, Matt Funes, Rob Brophy*, Roland Kato, Shawn Mann, Thomas Diener, Vicky Miskolczy, Brian Dembow
- Violin – Aimee Kreston, Alyssa Park, Ana Landauer, Bruce Dukov, Clayton Haslop, Dimitrie Leivici, Endre Granat, Eun-Mee Ahn, Haim Shtrum, Helen Nightengale, Henry Gronnier, Irina Voloshina, Jackie Brand, Jay Rosen, Katia Popov, Lisa Sutton, Marc Sazer, Natalie Leggett, Nina Evtuhov, Phil Levy, Rafael Rishik, Roger Wilkie, Sarah Thornblade, Serena McKinney, Tammy Hatwan, Tereza Stanislav, Julie Gigante
