= Music of Final Fantasy XV =

Music from the video game Final Fantasy XV

The music for the video game Final Fantasy XV, developed and published by Square Enix as the fifteenth mainline entry in the Final Fantasy series, was composed primarily by Yoko Shimomura. Having previously worked on the Kingdom Hearts series, among various other titles, Final Fantasy XV was her first project for the series. Shimomura was brought on board the project in 2006, when it was a spin-off title called Final Fantasy Versus XIII, (Note: Fainaru Fantajī Verusasu Sātīn (ファイナルファンタジーヴェルサスXIII)) and stayed in her role during the game's ten-year development cycle. Her music, based around themes of "friendship" and "filial bonds", incorporates multiple musical genres, such as orchestral, bossa nova, and American blues. Several tracks, including the main theme "Somnus", feature Latin lyrics written by the game's original director Tetsuya Nomura.

Final Fantasy XV was expanded into a multimedia project dubbed the "Final Fantasy XV Universe", for which other composers were hired; John R. Graham composed the music for the film Kingsglaive: Final Fantasy XV, with additional tunes from Shimomura. Yasuhisa Inoue and Susumi Akizuki of Righttrack wrote the music for the original net animation Brotherhood, while a team from the music studio Unique Note, who also worked on the base game, handled the mobile spin-off title Justice Monsters V. English indie rock band Florence and the Machine collaborated on three songs for the game, including a cover of Ben E. King's "Stand by Me", which acted as one of the two official theme songs. Later contributors to the soundtrack, via downloadable content packs, were Keiichi Okabe, Naoshi Mizuta, Yasunori Mitsuda, Nobuo Uematsu, Tadayoshi Makino, and Taku Iwasaki.

Multiple albums have been released containing music from Final Fantasy XV and its spin-off media. Final Fantasy XV Original Soundtrack was released in December 2016 in multiple versions, including a four-disc CD release, a Blu-ray release with additional tracks, and a special edition. The standard four-disc release was published internationally in 2017 by Sony Classical Records. The score for Kingsglaive was released in September 2016 as a two-disc CD. Other releases include a digital album for Justice Monsters V in September, and limited digital albums for both Kingsglaive and Platinum Demo, a commercial demo acting as a prequel to Final Fantasy XV. The songs from Florence and the Machine were released in August as digital singles under the banner title "Songs from Final Fantasy XV". Reception of the albums was generally positive, with the main soundtrack album and Welch's tracks reaching high positions on music charts.

== Creation and development ==
=== Final Fantasy XV ===
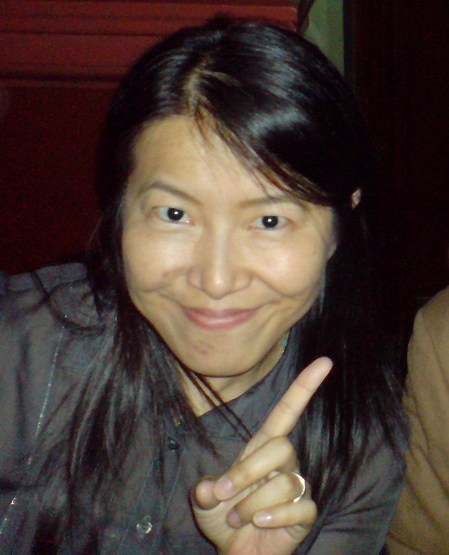
Yoko Shimomura served as the lead composer for Final Fantasy XV, writing around 80% of the soundtrack.

The musical score for the action role-playing game Final Fantasy XV, originally a spin-off game called Final Fantasy Versus XIII, was composed primarily by Yoko Shimomura, whose previous work included Parasite Eve, Legend of Mana, and the Kingdom Hearts series. Final Fantasy XV was her first time composing for the Final Fantasy series, so she took a more tentative approach than her Kingdom Hearts projects. Shimomura was involved with the project when XV was still titled Versus XIII, being hired to compose the music in 2006 and staying on through its ten-year development cycle. In 2010, Shimomura was still forming a framework for the game's music, ensuring that the music fitted the game without it solidifying into an image that seemed wrong. Her work over the time prior to its rebranding as Final Fantasy XV was fairly sporadic. Shimomura worked on around 80% of the music: the rest were variations on her work and other themes created by others involved in the soundtrack. Other composers who worked on the game were Tetsuya Shibata, Yoshino Aoki, Yoshitaka Suzuki and Mitsuhiro Ohta; the latter two assisted with arrangements.

The first track created by Shimomura for the game was "Somnus", at that time the official theme song. "Somnus" was sung by Aundréa L. Hopkins; its lyrics were written by original director Tetsuya Nomura, which were translated and adapted into Latin by Taro Yamashita and Kazuhiro Komiya. According to Nomura, the title, which translates from Latin to "Sleep", reflects the subject matter and real-world themes. An instrumental version was also created for use in Final Fantasy XV, having been recorded at around the same time as the vocal version. When Versus XIII was rebranded as XV, "Somnus" was retained as the game's main theme, though it was replaced as the official theme song. (Note: Quote from Gematsu: Tabata: "Stand by Me" is now the official song, but "Somnus" is still in the game and used in a very important way.) Another long-standing track was "Omnis Lacrima". Translating to "All the Tears", it was featured in trailers for both Versus XIII and XV. The lyrics for both "Omnis Lacrima" and other Final Fantasy XV tracks using Latin vocals were written by Nomura and translated by Yamashita. Nomura credited the high use of Latin to his wish for a language that was no longer used on a daily basis and that people "won't be able to understand and yet appreciate", desiring a sense of general equality.

The game's music was designed to encompass themes of "friendship" and "filial bonds". Initially, due to its status as a spin-off, Shimomura did not feel the same amount of pressure to conform to the legacy of previous composers. By the time the game changed from Versus XIII to XV, she had a clear idea of what the score would be like and so felt minimal reservations despite the game now being part of the main series. At the same time, she felt the need to respect the work of earlier composers such as Nobuo Uematsu while staying true to the series' legacy of musical variety. Despite the ten year development, the musical concepts Shimomura worked from did not change much: she constantly aimed at creating a darker score than other Final Fantasy titles. Ultimately, only a third of Shimomura's completed work for Versus XIII was carried over into XV.

New elements were added when the game became Final Fantasy XV, but that was to suit the new elements being introduced rather than overwriting previous work. In contrast to her work with Nomura, Shimomura's tracks were quickly approved by Tabata, who only later requested changes or revisions. The score combined multiple music genres: apart from Shimomura's typical classical style, she also incorporated other styles such as Bossa nova and American Blues for certain locations. For his work on the game, Suzuki drew on his work on the Metal Gear series, though he watched gameplay videos rather than cutscenes for his work on XV. The music was performed and recorded in Boston by the Video Game Orchestra, a North American orchestra specializing in video game music whose first Final Fantasy project had been Lightning Returns: Final Fantasy XIII in 2013. The orchestra's founder Shota Nakama helped with orchestration and arrangements for the soundtrack, in addition to composing the track "Bros on the Road". Nakama began working on the game in 2014, first working on tracks for promotional trailers.

During development, Shimomura discussed her music with the game's other developers so it fit the game's world, along with reading the story. Many of the tracks began as requests from the writers, and for some pieces there was a lot of consultation with staff including director Hajime Tabata while they were being written. Several tracks were meant to emote specific moods. For "Luna", the theme for the character Lunafreya Nox Fleuret, Shimomura used the character's beauty and strength as inspiration; for the titular theme of main protagonist Noctis Lucis Caelum, she chose to represent the weight of destiny upon him and his inner thoughts, creating a soft piece that portrayed his emotions. The theme "Apocalypsis Noctis" was intended to be both magnificent and intense, while the track "Melancolia" was meant to evoke sadness. The music had to include tracks for various times of day due to the game's day-night cycle. Uematsu's "Main Theme", a recurring theme within the Final Fantasy series, also appeared in an arranged form created by Shimomura and Nakama. Another recurring theme in the series, Uematsu's "Chocobo" theme, was remixed by Ohta for the tracks "Blues de Chocobo" and "Rodeo de Chocobo".

Concerning tracks related to times of day and elements such as battle themes, Shimomura allowed the flow of gameplay to dictate the flow of her music, which required putting in a number of natural transition points within pieces so the break would be smooth. To help with this, a special software tool called MAGI (Music API for Gaming Interaction) was developed to manage the tempo and create sync points that allowed the music's flow to be interactive while keeping its "epic" sound and scope. When the game began development as Versus XIII it used the same sound environment as Final Fantasy XIII, but with the move to new hardware the sound team needed to design a new sound environment. To develop the sound software, the team partnered with CRI Middleware to integrate the company's CRI ADX 2 middleware into the game's native sound environment. The amount of sound data, which also included 300 tracks of standalone music and 150 tracks of environmental music, required for the game was so large that there were fears it would not fit onto the game disc alongside the rest of the game data.

=== Theme songs ===
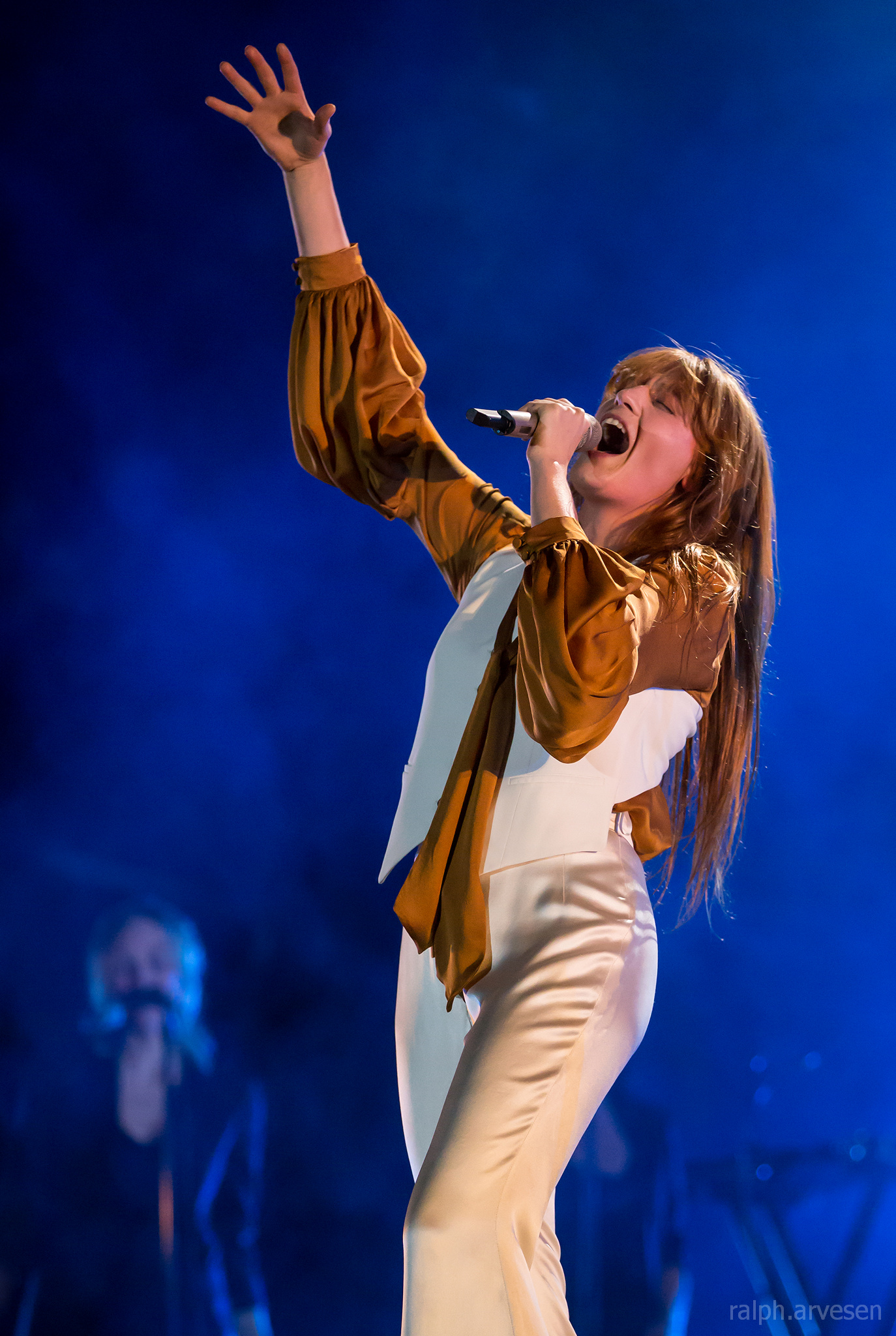
Florence Welch (pictured 2015) sang the game's theme songs, while her band Florence and the Machine performed them.

The game's theme song is a cover of Ben E. King's "Stand by Me", performed by the English indie rock band Florence and the Machine and sung by the band's leader, Florence Welch. It was used in all versions of the game. The cover used a full orchestra, including brass, strings and timpani. In addition, the recurring theme "Prelude to Final Fantasy" was incorporated as a backing player on the harp. Welch stated that she wanted to make a "mystical" contribution to the game. She also commented that "Stand by Me" was a difficult song to improve upon. When deciding upon an artist who had their own unique "world" that would fit with the setting of XV, Florence and the Machine was one of many bands Square Enix looked at.

In the context of XV, "Stand by Me" was not intended as a love song, but rather as a message or prayer of gratitude from Noctis to all who had supported him on his journey, including Lunafreya, his father Regis and his three companions Gladiolus Amicitia, Ignis Scientia and Prompto Argentum. Welch's contribution is notable as Final Fantasy theme songs have traditionally been performed by Asian singers, with the exception of XIII which substituted the Leona Lewis single "My Hands" in its English release for the Japanese version's "Kimi ga Iru Kara". In addition to the cover for "Stand by Me", Florence and the Machine created two original songs inspired by the world and story of XV, also sung by Welch: "Too Much Is Never Enough" and "I Will Be". Not all of the theme songs were used in the base game, with some coming in future content.

=== Additional media ===
In addition to Final Fantasy XV, the game received various forms of expanded media as part of a move to prevent the story spanning multiple games: this project was dubbed the "Final Fantasy XV Universe", and included Platinum Demo, the CGI feature film Kingsglaive, the original net animation series Brotherhood, and the mobile title Justice Monsters V. The music for Brotherhood was composed by Yasuhisa Inoue and Susumi Akizuki of Righttrack. For Justice Monsters V, the music was composed by a five-member team from the music production company, Unique Note.

The music for Kingsglaive was composed by John R. Graham, with additional themes by Shimomura taken from her score for Final Fantasy XV. Suzuki also worked on the Kingsglaive soundtrack. Shimomura also composed the film's main theme. Graham had previously contributed to the score of Square Enix's Bloodmasque and the 2014 film The Forger. For a few of Shimomura's pieces used in the film, the arrangement was altered to make it darker and add scale. Some tracks, such as "Battle for the Crown City", changed a lot during the score's development based on the scene it was set to within the film. While both orchestral and electronic elements were used in the score, the film's director Takeshi Nozue insisted on keeping the electronic elements to a minimum and fuse those that existed with the score to create a distorted clash of elements. This was due to the story of the film revolving around Lucis' Crystal and the rules surrounding its magic, in addition to the story focusing on the differing reactions of people facing extraordinary circumstances.

According to Graham, Nozue wanted a complex musical score. The harmonics and themes change throughout the score to create both an ambiguous atmosphere and a sense of impending tragedy and loss. Graham was brought on board to create a score that would fill the film's world and act as a counterbalance to Shimomura's music from the game, which was incorporated into the overall score. Due to the themes and events of Kingsglaive, Graham needed his music to reflect the weight, contradictions, and shifting "light and dark" perspectives of the characters and locations. He wrote more than 100 minutes of music. The score was recorded entirely in the United States in Nashville, Tennessee, with the Nashville Music Scoring Orchestra. The score was orchestrated and conducted by Eric Schmidt, and produced by Koyo Sonae. Daniel Kresco handled recording, mixing and engineering. The score was described by Nozue as "Shimomura meets Hollywood". This effect was reinforced by Graham's work. Graham also contributed to the game's soundtrack, creating arrangements for "Song of the Stars" and "Dawn".

The original commercial demo Episode Duscae featured music both from earlier trailers and new tracks. The music for Episode Duscae was performed by the Video Game Orchestra. Selected tracks from the game were included in Platinum Demo, a commercial demo that acted as a prequel to Final Fantasy XV. Additional music from across the Final Fantasy series was included for players to listen to on the radio of the party's car Regalia: available tracks ranged from the mainline Final Fantasy games to spin-off titles such as Dissidia Final Fantasy and Final Fantasy Type-0. For the 2016 Electronic Entertainment Expo trailer, Square Enix collaborated with rap artist Afrojack to create a piece of music that would emulate the trailer's fast-paced action. Working together with editor Hidekazu Kato under the development title "Xtream", Afrojack was approached as the team wanted a trailer which would stand out at the event. The promotional trailer "Omen", produced by Digic Pictures based on the world and story of Final Fantasy XV, was set to "Endlessness", composed by dedicated trailer music company IMAscore. The music was composed by IMAscore's lead composer Andreas Kübler.

=== Downloadable content ===
Suzuki acted as main composer for the game's story-based downloadable content (DLC), along with Shibata and Aoki. The music for the Royal Edition, which included both released DLC content and added story sections, was composed by Shimomura and Suzuki. Suzuki and Aoki handled music for Monster of the Deep: Final Fantasy XV. Shimomura was also composing a new theme song for the 2019 DLC series Dawn of the Future prior to its cancellation in late 2018. A regular contributor to the DLC was Tadayoshi Makino, who had previously worked on Dragon's Dogma and Final Fantasy Record Keeper.

Keiichi Okabe, the composer for Nier: Automata, was brought on to help with the DLC episode Episode Gladiolus. He worked on the theme song "Shield of the King" and an arrangement of "Battle at the Big Bridge", a battle theme associated with recurring character Gilgamesh. When writing "Shield of the King", Okabe wanted to portray the burden of responsibility and fate Gladiolus bore, which he compared to the burden of character 2B in Nier: Automata. "Battle at the Big Bridge" was initially going to have minimal work done due to its favored place among fans of the Final Fantasy series, but with encouragement from game staff Okabe arranged the track within his own musical style. To accomplish this, Okabe incorporated vocal elements similar to those used in Nier: Automata. The main theme and selected tracks for Episode Prompto were composed by Naoshi Mizuta, who had previously composed music for Final Fantasy XI and XIII-2. While he had previously been told to compose his themes based on specific scenes within the game or on developer requests, Mizuta was instead given a comprehensive description of Prompto's backstory and life history. Mizuta built up his musical image from there; a central part of the DLC was showing Prompto's more serious side as opposed to his role in the main game as a mood maker. Mizuta was purposely not told what type of sound the team wanted, with them instead waiting to see what ideas he could come up with.

For Episode Ignis, three new pieces were composed by Yasunori Mitsuda, who had worked with Square Enix staff on the music of games including Chrono Trigger, Chrono Cross and Xenogears. Additional music was composed by Makino and Tomomichi Takeoka. Mitsuda decided to represent Ignis's character using a single violin, despite the risk of the more bombastic orchestral elements obscuring the violin work. Final Fantasy XV was his first Final Fantasy project. The pieces were performed by the Brussels Philharmonic Orchestra. An additional new track for Episode Ignis, "Apocalypsis Magnatus", was composed by Shimomura and arranged by Makino.

The multiplayer expansion Comrades had its theme song composed by Uematsu. Titled "Choosing Hope", the theme was sung by Japanese vocalist Emiko Suzuki. When composing the theme, Uematsu drew inspiration from gospel music as he felt the tone would fit into the world's theme. Speaking about the recording session, Uematsu said it was the first time he remembered holding back tears. Additional music was composed by Suzuki, Makino, Tsutomu Narita, and Tomomichi Takeoka and Tai Tomisawa from Makino's company SpinSolfa. Makino contributed new battle themes and a medley of previous character themes to a later expansion of Comrades.

The music for Episode Ardyn was co-composed by Kenji Hiramatsu, and anime composer Taku Iwasaki. Iwasaki was requested by scenario director Toru Osanai. Director Takefumi Terada described the main themes of the narrative and gameplay to Iwasaki before work began. The team wanted a modern sound to go with the villainous role of lead character Ardyn Izunia and the urban setting of the DLC episode. Iwasaki also composed the title screen track, which was based on the story's themes. In contrast to Iwasaki's other work, the title theme was dedicated to Aera Mirus Fleuret, a key character in Ardyn's backstory. It was written as the kind of theme Ardyn as a character would never be associated with. Rap sections for the track "Conditioned to Hate" were performed by Lotus Juice. The rap segments were decided upon in the middle of production, and the team approved them as they felt it was "unprecedented" within the series.

== Albums ==
=== Final Fantasy XV Original Soundtrack ===
Final Fantasy XV Original Soundtrack

Soundtrack album by Yoko Shimomura, Tetsuya Shibata, Yoshino Aoki, Yoshitaka Suzuki
- Released: December 21, 2016 (Japan); February 24, 2017 (Europe); March 24, 2017 (North America)
- Genre: Video game soundtrack
- Label: Square Enix Music (Japan); Sony Classical Records (international)
- Producer: Koyo Sonae

The game's official soundtrack album, Final Fantasy XV Original Soundtrack, (Note: Fainaru Fantajī Fifutīn Orijinaru Saundotorakku (ファイナルファンタジーXV オリジナル・サウンドトラック)) was released first in Japan on December 21, 2016. The album was produced by Koyo Sonae. The soundtrack came in multiple editions. The standard four-disc CD and one-disc Blu-ray releases featured the entire in-game soundtrack with the exception of "Stand by Me", coming to ninety tracks of music. A limited edition featured two Blu-ray discs and a CD; the first Blu-ray featured the full game soundtrack, the second Blu-ray disc held the track selection from the party's car radio in addition to Welch's rendition of "Stand by Me", while the CD featured versions of selected tracks arranged for piano by Yui Morishita and Takuro Iga. The limited edition also had additional contents including behind-the-scenes footage concerning the recording of the soundtrack. The piano arrangements were performed by Yui Morishita, a noted Japanese pianist. Selected tracks were also included in a "Special Soundtrack" Blu-ray disc released as part of the Final Fantasy XV Ultimate Collector's Edition. The four-disc edition, which includes all available tracks from that version, was released internationally by Sony Classical Records in 2017. This version was released in Europe on February 24, and in North America on March 24.

The Blu-ray and CD versions both entered the Oricon charts at #35, remaining in the charts for a further nine weeks. The album was nominated for the 2017 Game Audio Network Guild's "Best Original Soundtrack Album" award, though it lost to the soundtrack album for Abzû. Samar Farag of RPGFan was highly positive about the album and its mixture of tracks, saying that the shifts in style captured the game's theme of a road trip, with the exception of the track "Bros on the Road" which he said was "more appropriate in Sonic Adventure 2". The rest of the album was generally praised, with the last section's dark tones and use of leitmotifs from "Somnus", the environmental track "Valse di Fantastica", and the character track "Ardyn" earning particular praise. Video Game Music Online's Lucas Versantvoort gave the album a score of 3/5; while several tracks stood out as being good, he felt there was a lack of cohesive style present in other recent Final Fantasy scores, feeling that it was a lower-quality example of Shimomura's work than her earlier work on Kingdom Hearts. He also found the other contributors' work mixed, and disliked the mixture of different musical styles. Both reviewers praised "Somnus" as the album's best track; Farag said he could "easily call "Somnus" one of Shimomura's greatest songs", while Versantvoort felt that it was underused in the soundtrack as a whole.

=== Final Fantasy XV Original Soundtrack: Volume 2 ===
Final Fantasy XV Original Soundtrack Volume 2

Soundtrack album by Yoko Shimomura, Keiichi Okabe, Naoshi Mizuta, Nobuo Uematsu, Yasunori Mitsuda
- Released: March 21, 2018
- Genre: Video game soundtrack
- Label: Square Enix Music

A second album for CD and Blu-ray, Final Fantasy XV Original Soundtrack: Volume 2, was released on March 21, 2018. The album covers music from post-release DLC and the game's expanded Royal Edition. The five-disc CD release and first disc of the Blu-ray version contain the soundtracks from Episode Gladiolus, Episode Prompto, Episode Ignis, Comrades and the Royal Edition. The second Blu-ray disc includes music from Monster of the Deep: Final Fantasy XV, the main game's "Chocobo Carnival" and Assassin's Creed collaboration events, and a live performance of the piano collections concert recorded in Osaka in June 2016.

=== Kingsglaive: Final Fantasy XV Original Soundtrack ===
Kingsglaive: Final Fantasy XV Original Soundtrack

Soundtrack album by John R. Graham & Yoko Shimomura
- Released: September 7, 2016
- Genre: Film soundtrack
- Label: Square Enix Music

Kingsglaive: Final Fantasy XV Original Soundtrack (Note: Kingusugureibu: Fainaru Fantajī Fifutīn Orijinaru Saundotorakku (キングスグレイブ ファイナルファンタジーXV オリジナル・サウンドトラック)) is the soundtrack album for Kingsglaive, containing all the music featured in the film. It was composed by John R. Graham, with added themes from Final Fantasy XV and the main theme composed by Yoko Shimomura. The two-CD album came on September 7, 2016. The album was also available for download from September 13 to November 29 the same year. It is exclusive to PlayStation Plus subscribers and requires the download of a special mobile application.

Chris Greening of Video Game Music Online gave the score a rating of 4/5 stars: "Overall, the grand scale of the score was effective. There is no question by the end of the album that the aim of the director – and composer – was to create a grand-scale orchestral epic. While some of the thematic content occasionally gets lost in the bombastic instrumentation, the score itself is heartfelt and authentic, and makes for an enjoyable listen. When compared to Advent Children, the score to Kingsglaive is darker and more cinematic, setting a refreshing precedent for any future Final Fantasy films".

=== Songs from Final Fantasy XV ===
Songs from Final Fantasy XV

EP by Florence and the Machine
- Released: August 12, 2016
- Genre: Music album
- Label: Island Records

Florence and the Machine chronology
How Big, How Blue, How Beautiful (2015)	Songs from Final Fantasy XV (2016)	High as Hope (2018)

Songs from Final Fantasy XV is a digital extended play compilation of the three songs by the English group Florence and the Machine, "Stand by Me", "Too Much Is Never Enough", and "I Will Be", released together as digital singles by Island Records on August 12, 2016. In addition to Florence and the Machine, the singles were produced with the help of Emile Haynie and Jeff Bhasker.

In their first week of release, "Stand by Me" and "Too Much Is Never Enough" both charted: "Too Much Is Never Enough" broke the top 100 in the United States, United Kingdom, Australia, Brazil, Canada, France, Germany, Italy, and Spain; "Stand by Me" only succeeded in charting in the Brazilian charts, reaching #27. "I Will Be" failed to chart.

KT Wong of Video Game Music Online gave the album a perfect score of 5/5 stars. Favorably comparing it to Welch's work on the band's album Ceremonials, he gave each track high praise: he felt "Too Much Is Never Enough" successfully combined Noctis' journey with Welch's signature composition style, praised "Stand by Me" as a cover that was both respectful and suitable for use with Final Fantasy, and found "I Will Be" an excellent instrumental track backed up by Welch's vocals. He summed up by calling the album "a worthy purchase for all fans of Final Fantasy as well as of Florence and the Machine". Patrick Gann of RPGFan called "Too Much Is Never Enough" his personal favorite from the album, calling it superior to the use of "My Hands" or the work of Angela Aki. He also praised "Stand by Me", saying that the version in the "Uncovered" even trailer did not do the full piece justice. He called "I Will Be" the type of song it was easy to become absorbed in despite the lack of understandable lyrics. He called the overall album "a day-one purchase for [him]".

=== Other releases ===
A soundtrack album for Justice Monsters V, Justice Monsters V Original Soundtrack, (Note: Jasutisu Monsutāzu Faibu Orijinaru Saundotorakku (ジャスティス モンスターズ ファイブ オリジナル・サウンドトラック)) was released digitally on September 19, 2016, which consisted of eighteen tracks composed by members of Unique Note. It was also released as a limited physical release, sold by Square Enix under their "Square Enix Music" label at the 2016 Tokyo Game Show. A six-track digital album for Platinum Demo was for sale from September 13 to November 29 the same year. Exclusive to PlayStation Plus subscribers and requiring the download of a special mobile application, it included visuals from the demo accompanying each track, and commentary from Shimomura on each track's creation. "Endless", the theme used in the "Omen" trailer, was released on the album Sublimation through a collaboration of trailer music labels End of Silence and Really Slow Motion. Final Fantasy XV Piano Collections, an album of tracks arranged for piano by Sachiko Miyano and Natsumi Kameoka, was released on February 22, 2017.

== Legacy ==
The tracks "Somnus" and "Omnis Lacrima" from the game were included in compilation albums of Shimomura's music, and the former was released as downloadable content for Theatrhythm Final Fantasy when XV was still known as Versus XIII. Despite being a tune from a game which had then been in development for six years, Theatrhythm producer Ichiro Hazama decided to include it as it was a widely known song among the fans by that point, and that its inclusion would add to Theatrhythm's purpose as a celebration of the Final Fantasy series for its 25th anniversary. Nomura also approved of the song's inclusion. A live concert was performed by the London Philharmonic Orchestra at Abbey Road Studios on September 7, 2016. It featured 12 tracks from the game, and featured a guest appearance by Shimomura. Selections from the game were played by the Video Game Orchestra in Tokyo on March 25, 2017, alongside those of several other series. Orchestral performances of the instrumental version of "Somnus" and the track "Apocalypsis Noctis" were included in the album Distant Worlds IV: More Music from Final Fantasy, which was released on June 30, 2017. An original orchestral arrangement of themes from the game by Shimomura was performed in Stockholm by the Royal Stockholm Philharmonic Orchestra at the Symphonic Memories concert, which also included selections from prior concerts of Final Fantasy music Symphonic Fantasies, Final Symphony, and Final Symphony II.
