= Wish That You Were Here =

Single by Florence and the Machine
- Released: 26 August 2016
- Genre: Art rock
- Length: 6:44
- Label: Island
- Songwriters: Florence Welch; Andrew Wyatt; Emile Haynie
- Producer: Emile Haynie

Florence and the Machine singles chronology
"Delilah" (2015)	"Wish That You Were Here" (2016)	"Stand by Me" (2017)

Audio video
- "Wish That You Were Here" on YouTube

"Wish That You Were Here" is a song by English indie rock band Florence and the Machine written by Florence Welch, Andrew Wyatt, and Emile Haynie. It was released by Island Records on 26 August 2016. The song was made available via digital download and is featured on the soundtrack of the film Miss Peregrine's Home for Peculiar Children, which was directed by Tim Burton. Welch, a longtime fan of Burton's work, had expressed interest in collaborating with him long before the recording of "Wish That You Were Here", as they shared similar artistic themes. Upon release, the composition was positively received by music critics and reached number 128 on the UK Singles Chart.

== Background ==
On 2 July 2016, Florence and the Machine performed at the annual British Summer Time in Hyde Park, London, marking an end to the group's successful tour in support of their third studio album, How Big, How Blue, How Beautiful. Nonetheless, the group remained relatively active, contributing three songs, "Too Much Is Never Enough", "I Will Be", and a cover version of Ben E. King's "Stand by Me", to the Final Fantasy XV video game soundtrack. Florence and the Machine's recordings were compiled on the EP Songs from Final Fantasy XV on 12 August for digital download.

Keeping in their trend of soundtrack work, the band and film director Tim Burton collaborated in composing "Wish That You Were Here" for Burton's movie adaptation of Miss Peregrine's Home for Peculiar Children. Welch had been a big-time fan of Burton's work and was interested in teaming up with him long before "Wish That You Were Here", calling Burton a "kindred spirit" who shared in her themes of dark romance and fantasy. To prepare to compose a song that complemented the film, Welch read the novel version of Miss Peregrine's Home for Peculiar Children.

The song was partly inspired while Florence and the Machine was in the midst of a busy touring schedule; Welch commented, "it [touring] comes at a cost — a cost of leaving the people you love behind for a year or two. You kind of feel like if you could sing a song into the wind, maybe the wind could take it to them in a way that you can't with a text or a call. You just want to send your love in a different way, in a way to somehow reach the unreachable". Music critic Rebecca Deczynski described "Wish That You Were Here"'s sound as a combination of everything that made the band successful, including "the same cathartic crash of percussion that made 'Shake It Out' an instant hit", and "the ethereal peals of harps found in 'Cosmic Love'".

== Release ==
"Wish That You Were Here" was released on 26 August 2016 for digital download with a still image taken from Miss Peregrine's Home for Peculiar Children. It is featured during the ending credits of the film, which debuted in theaters on 30 September. The song managed to reach number 128 on the UK Singles Chart. In his review for Rolling Stone magazine, Jon Blistein praised Welch for "singing wistfully over a distant keyboard and string plucks", also noting the "bombastic chorus that's as determined as it is heartbreaking". Critic Christine Costello regarded the collaboration between the group and Burton as one of the most interesting pairings of 2016, also stating "Welch’s renowned, whimsical vocals and art-pop sound are a perfect backdrop for Burton’s infamous scenes of twisting trees, gloomy palettes and underworld aesthetic often captured in his films".

== Charts ==
Chart performance for "Wish That You Were Here"
Chart (2016)	Peak position
Scotland Singles (OCC)	34
UK Singles (OCC)	128
