= Mike Higham =

- Genres: Film score, pop
- Occupations: Record producer; audio engineer; sound editor; music editor; music supervisor; composer
- Years active: 1992–present

Michael John Higham (born 25 April 1970) is a British sound editor, record producer, audio engineer, and composer known for his work in film and television. He won a Primetime Emmy Award for Outstanding Sound Editing for a Limited Series, Movie, or Special for his work on the 2001 HBO miniseries Band of Brothers.

== Career ==
Higham began his career as a recording engineer for producer Trevor Horn, and worked with artists like Seal, Tina Turner, Eric Clapton, and Sting. Since the late 1990s, he has worked primarily as a music editor and supervisor for feature films; including High Fidelity, Bridget Jones's Diary, Charlie and the Chocolate Factory, Hellboy II: The Golden Army, Captain Phillips, and Edge of Tomorrow. He was co-composer on the Tim Burton 2016 film Miss Peregrine's Home for Peculiar Children, substituting for Burton's usual collaborator Danny Elfman.

== Awards and nominations ==
=== Won ===
- 2002 Primetime Emmy Award for Outstanding Sound Editing for a Limited Series, Movie, or Special (for Band of Brothers)
- 2017 ASCAP Film and Television Music Award for Top Box Office Films (for Miss Peregrine's Home for Peculiar Children) – with Matthew Margeson
- 2001 Golden Reel Award for Best Sound Editing – Music (Foreign & Domestic) (for High Fidelity)

=== Nominated ===
- 2016 Golden Reel Award for Best Sound Editing – Music in a Feature Film (for Mission: Impossible – Rogue Nation)
- 2015 Golden Reel Award for Best Sound Editing Best Sound Editing – Music in a Musical Feature Film (for Into the Woods)
- 2015 Guild of Music Supervisors Award for Best Music Supervision for Films Budgeted Over $25 Million (for Into the Woods) – with Paul Gemignani
- 2011 Golden Reel Award for Best Sound Editing – Music in a Feature Film (for Alice in Wonderland)
- 2008 Golden Reel Award for Best Sound Editing Best Sound Editing – Music in a Musical Feature Film (for Sweeney Todd: The Demon Barber of Fleet Street)
- 2005 Golden Reel Award for Best Sound Editing in Feature Film – Animated (for Corpse Bride)
