= Florence and the Machine discography =

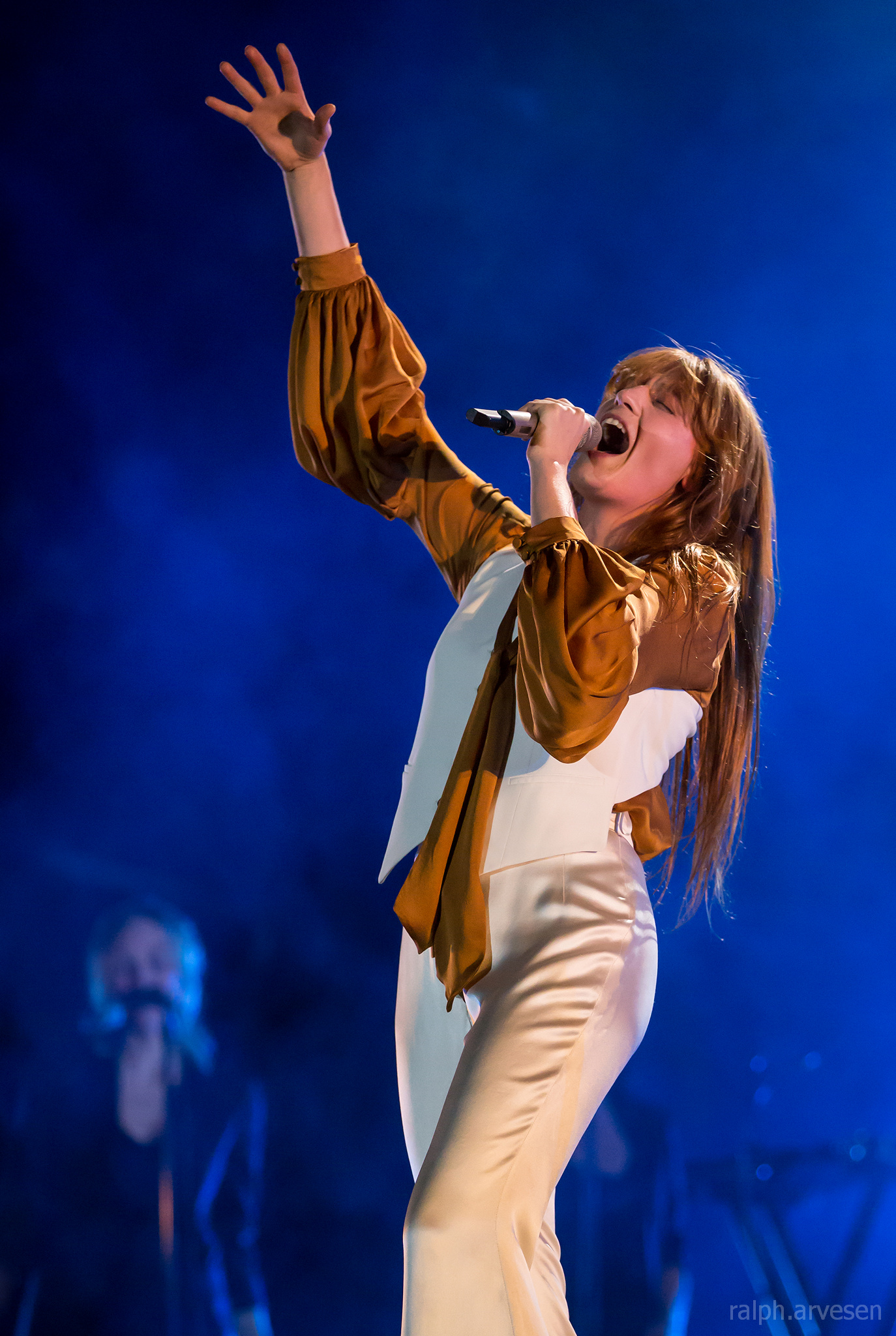
- Florence Welch of Florence and the Machine performing in 2015
- Studio albums: 6
- Extended plays: 6
- Live albums: 3
- Compilation albums: 4
- Singles: 34
- Music videos: 33
- Promotional singles: 4

English indie rock band Florence and the Machine have released six studio albums, three live albums, four compilation albums, six extended plays, 33 singles, four promotional singles and 29 music videos.

Florence and the Machine released their first extended play, A Lot of Love. A Lot of Blood, in March 2009. Their debut studio album, Lungs, was released in July 2009 through Island Records, reaching number one on the UK Albums Chart in January 2010. The album was subsequently certified sextuple platinum in the United Kingdom, quadruple platinum in Ireland and triple platinum in Australia. The album's lead single "Kiss with a Fist" peaked at number 51 on the UK Singles Chart. This was succeeded by the single "Dog Days Are Over", which reached number 23 in the UK and number 21 on the Billboard Hot 100 in the United States, and was certified quadruple platinum by the Recording Industry Association of America (RIAA). Third single "Rabbit Heart (Raise It Up)" reached number 12 in the UK and number 41 in Ireland. "Drumming Song" was released as the fourth single, charting at number 54 in the UK. "You've Got the Love", a cover of The Source's song of the same name, peaked at number five in the UK and number nine in Australia. A performance at the 2010 Brit Awards on 17 February 2010 saw the Dizzee Rascal-assisted mash-up ""You Got the Dirtee Love"" debut at number two in the UK. The album's sixth and final single, "Cosmic Love", peaked at number 51 in the UK and number three in Ireland.

The band's second studio album, Ceremonials, was released in October 2011, debuting atop the charts in the UK, Ireland, Australia and New Zealand. The album's release was preceded by the promotional single "What the Water Gave Me", which peaked at number 24 in the UK, number 13 in Ireland and number 15 in New Zealand. Lead single "Shake It Out" became the band's fifth top-40 hit in the UK, peaking at number 12 upon release in September 2011. The track also attained international chart success, reaching number 72 on the Billboard Hot 100 and becoming the band's highest-peaking single in Ireland, where it reached number two. The album also saw the release of singles "No Light, No Light" and "Never Let Me Go", which peaked at numbers 50 and 82 on the UK chart, respectively. Their next release "Spectrum (Say My Name)" peaked at number one in the UK, becoming their first UK number-one single.

In June 2015, Florence and the Machine released their third studio album, How Big, How Blue, How Beautiful, which debuted at number one in eight countries including the UK and the US and reached the top 10 of 20 countries. The album had sold over a million copies worldwide by the end of 2015 and has been certified platinum in the UK, Australia and Poland, and gold in New Zealand. It was promoted by the singles "What Kind of Man" and "Ship to Wreck", which both reached the top 40 in the UK, Ireland and New Zealand, as well as "Queen of Peace" and "Delilah".

In January and February 2022, Florence and the Machine released three compilation albums to streaming services – each a selection of eleven songs from previous albums. The first, Water to Drink Not Write About, features songs themed around water. The second, My Favourite Ghosts, is a selection of songs with supernatural themes. The third, Harder Than Hell, is a selection of love songs. All three compilations feature hand-drawn artwork by Welch. In May 2022, the band released their fifth album, Dance Fever.

== Albums ==
=== Studio albums ===
List of studio albums, with selected chart positions, sales figures and certifications
Title	Details	Peak chart positions										Sales	Certifications
Title	Details	UK	AUS	AUT	BEL (FL)	CAN	GER	IRL	NZ	SWI	US	Sales	Certifications
Lungs	Released: 3 July 2009; Label: Island; Formats: CD, LP, digital download, streaming	1	3	73	3	20	41	2	3	54	14	UK: 2,015,109; US: 1,142,000	BPI: 6× Platinum; ARIA: 4× Platinum; BRMA: Gold; BVMI: Platinum; IRMA: 4× Platinum; MC: Gold; RIAA: 2× Platinum; RMNZ: 4× Platinum
Ceremonials	Released: 28 October 2011; Label: Island; Formats: CD, LP, digital download, streaming	1	1	12	4	4	7	1	1	10	6	UK: 1,061,271; US: 1,002,000	BPI: 3× Platinum; ARIA: 4× Platinum; BRMA: Gold; BVMI: 3× Gold; IFPI AUT: Gold; IRMA: 3× Platinum; MC: Gold; RIAA: Platinum; RMNZ: 4× Platinum
How Big, How Blue, How Beautiful	Released: 29 May 2015; Label: Island; Formats: CD, LP, digital download, streaming	1	1	2	2	1	3	1	1	1	1	UK: 440,141; US: 290,000; Worldwide: 1,000,000+	BPI: Platinum; ARIA: Platinum; BVMI: Gold; IFPI AUT: Gold; RIAA: Gold; RMNZ: Platinum
High as Hope	Released: 29 June 2018; Label: Virgin EMI; Formats: CD, LP, digital download, streaming	2	2	3	1	2	5	2	2	2	2	UK: 165,647; US: 74,000	BPI: Gold; RMNZ: Gold
Dance Fever	Released: 13 May 2022; Label: Polydor; Formats: Digital download, streaming, CD, LP, Book/CD	1	2	4	2	7	2	2	2	7	7	UK: 122,981	BPI: Gold; RMNZ: Gold
Everybody Scream	Released: 31 October 2025; Label: Polydor; Formats: Digital download, streaming, CD, LP	1	4	1	3	9	3	3	6	2	4	UK: 31,369; US: 56,000	BPI: Silver

=== Compilation albums ===
List of compilation albums
Title	Details	Peak chart positions			Sales
Title	Details	UK	UK Stream.	IRL	Sales
Water to Drink Not Write About	Released: 28 January 2022; Label: Island; Format: Digital download, streaming	—	—	—	
My Favourite Ghosts	Released: 4 February 2022; Label: Island; Format: Digital download, streaming	—	—	—	
Harder than Hell	Released: 11 February 2022; Label: Island; Format: Digital download, streaming	—	—	—	
Under Heaven Over Hell	Released: 10 August 2023; Label: Virgin EMI, Island, Polydor; Format: Digital download, streaming	89	84	19	
"—" denotes a recording that did not chart or was not released in that territory.

=== Live albums ===
List of live albums, with selected chart positions and sales figures
Title	Details	Peak chart positions										Sales
Title	Details	UK	AUS	AUT	BEL (FL)	CAN	IRL	NZ	POR	SCO	US	Sales
Live at the Wiltern	Released: 28 June 2011; Label: Island; Format: Digital download	—	—	—	—	—	—	—	—	—	—	
MTV Unplugged	Released: 6 April 2012; Label: Island; Formats: CD/DVD, digital download	27	17	72	6	45	15	27	10	27	51	UK: 48,094
Dance Fever (Live at Madison Square Garden)	Released: 14 October 2022; Label: Polydor; Format: Digital download, LP, streaming	— (Note: Dance Fever (Live at Madison Square Garden) did not enter the UK Albums Chart but peaked at number 71 on the UK Album Downloads Chart.)	—	—	—	—	—	—	—	31	— (Note: https://www.billboard.com/artist/florence-&-the-machine/chart-history/tsl/)	
Symphony of Lungs (BBC Proms at the Royal Albert Hall)	Released: 25 October 2024 (digital); Released: 14 March 2025 (LP); Label: UMR; Format: Digital download, LP, streaming	38	—	54	34	—	—	—	—	6	—	
Everybody Scream Tour Live	Released: 06 November 2026; Label: Polydor; Format: Digital download, LP, streaming	—	—	—	—	—	—	—	—	–	— (Note: https://www.popscoop.org/2026/10/31/florence-the-machine-announce-everybody-scream-tour-live-album/)	
"—" denotes a recording that did not chart or was not released in that territory.

== Extended plays ==
Title	Details	Peak chart positions			
Title	Details	AUS	US	US Alt	US Rock
A Lot of Love. A Lot of Blood	Released: 28 April 2009; Label: Iamsound; Format: 12-inch vinyl	—	—	—	—
iTunes Festival: London 2010	Released: 21 July 2010; Label: Island; Format: Digital download	—	—	—	—
iTunes Live from SoHo	Released: 16 November 2010; Label: Island; Format: Digital download	—	—	—	—
Lungs – The B-Sides	Released: 27 February 2011; Label: Universal Republic; Format: Digital download	—	113	22	29
Apple Music Festival: London 2015	Released: 15 October 2015; Label: Island; Format: Digital download	—	—	—	—
Songs from Final Fantasy XV	Released: 12 August 2016; Label: Island; Format: Digital download	57	— (Note: Songs from Final Fantasy XV did not enter the Billboard 200, but peaked at number eight on the Hot Singles Sales chart.)	—	—

== Singles ==
=== As lead artist ===
List of singles, with selected chart positions and certifications, showing year released and album name
Title	Year	Peak chart positions										Certifications	Album
Title	Year	UK	AUS	AUT	BEL (FL)	CAN	GER	IRL	NZ	SWI	US	Certifications	Album
"Kiss with a Fist"	2008	51	— (Note: "Kiss with a Fist" did not enter the Australian ARIA Singles Chart but peaked at number 10 on the ARIA Hitseekers Chart.)	—	—	—	—	—	—	—	—	BPI: Silver; RIAA: Gold	Lungs
"Dog Days Are Over"	2008	21	47	—	21	19	—	6	27	—	21	BPI: 6× Platinum; ARIA: 7× Platinum; BVMI: Gold; RIAA: 6× Platinum; RMNZ: 8× Platinum	Lungs
"Rabbit Heart (Raise It Up)"	2009	12	93	—	50	—	—	41	—	—	—	BPI: Gold	Lungs
"Drumming Song"	2009	54	— (Note: "Drumming Song" did not enter the Australian ARIA Singles Chart but peaked at number 18 on the ARIA Hitseekers Chart.)	—	—	—	—	—	—	—	—		Lungs
"You've Got the Love"	2009	5	9	28	25	—	52	16	— (Note: "You've Got the Love" did not enter the NZ Top 40 Singles Chart, but peaked at number 50 on the New Zealand Airplay Chart.)	49	—	BPI: 6× Platinum; ARIA: 7× Platinum; BVMI: Gold; RIAA: Platinum; RMNZ: 5× Platinum	Lungs
"You Got the Dirtee Love" (with Dizzee Rascal)	2010	2	27	—	—	—	24	—	—	—	—	BPI: Platinum; ARIA: Gold	Non-album single
"Cosmic Love"	2010	51	—	—	— (Note: "Cosmic Love" did not enter the Ultratop 50, but peaked at number 5 on the Flemish Ultratip chart.)	—	—	3	—	—	—	BPI: Gold; ARIA: Platinum; RIAA: Platinum; RMNZ: Gold	Lungs
"Heavy in Your Arms"	2010	53	—	—	—	—	—	—	—	—	—		The Twilight Saga: Eclipse
"Shake It Out"	2011	12	36	16	— (Note: "Shake It Out" did not enter the Ultratop 50, but peaked at number 2 on the Flemish Ultratip chart.)	52	30	2	16	23	72	BPI: 2× Platinum; ARIA: 3× Platinum; BVMI: Gold; RIAA: 3× Platinum; RMNZ: 3× Platinum	Ceremonials
"No Light, No Light"	2012	50	95	—	— (Note: "No Light, No Light" did not enter the Ultratop 50, but peaked at number 10 on the Flemish Ultratip chart.)	—	—	50	—	—	—	BPI: Silver; RIAA: Gold	Ceremonials
"Never Let Me Go"	2012	82	3	—	— (Note: "Never Let Me Go" did not enter the Ultratop 50, but peaked at number 15 on the Flemish Ultratip chart.)	75	—	73	—	—	—	BPI: Gold; ARIA: 6× Platinum; RIAA: Gold; RMNZ: Platinum	Ceremonials
"Breath of Life"	2012	87	57	64	—	— (Note: "Breath of Life" did not enter the Billboard Canadian Hot 100, but peaked at number 71 on the Canadian Digital Song Sales chart.)	65	68	—	—	— (Note: "Breath of Life" did not enter the Billboard Hot 100, but peaked at number 11 on the Bubbling Under Hot 100 Singles chart.)		Snow White and the Huntsman
"Spectrum (Say My Name)"	2012	1	4	51	2	— (Note: "Spectrum (Say My Name)" did not enter the Billboard Canadian Hot 100, but peaked at number 70 on the Canadian Digital Song Sales chart.)	32	1	2	58	— (Note: "Spectrum (Say My Name)" did not enter the Billboard Hot 100, but peaked at number 12 on the Hot Singles Sales chart.)	BPI: 3× Platinum; ARIA: 5× Platinum; BRMA: Gold; BVMI: Gold; RMNZ: 3× Platinum	Ceremonials
"Lover to Lover"	2012	—	—	—	— (Note: "Lover to Lover" did not enter the Ultratop 50, but peaked at number 25 on the Flemish Ultratip chart.)	—	—	—	—	—	—		Ceremonials
"What Kind of Man"	2015	37	16	52	50	46	—	31	34	42	88	BPI: Silver; ARIA: Platinum; RIAA: Gold; RMNZ: Gold	How Big, How Blue, How Beautiful
"Ship to Wreck"	2015	27	48	66	12	—	81	38	37	— (Note: "Ship to Wreck" did not enter the Swiss Singles chart, but charted at number 64 on the Swiss Airplay chart.)	— (Note: "Ship to Wreck" did not enter the Billboard Hot 100, but peaked at number 14 on the Bubbling Under Hot 100 Singles chart.)	BPI: Platinum; ARIA: Platinum; RIAA: Gold; RMNZ: Platinum	How Big, How Blue, How Beautiful
"Queen of Peace"	2015	133	—	—	— (Note: "Queen of Peace" did not enter the Ultratop 50, but peaked at number 2 on the Flemish Ultratip chart.)	—	—	—	—	—	—		How Big, How Blue, How Beautiful
"Delilah"	2015	102	41	—	31	—	—	—	—	—	—	BPI: Silver	How Big, How Blue, How Beautiful
"Wish That You Were Here"	2016	128	—	—	—	—	—	—	—	—	—		Non-album single
"Sky Full of Song"	2018	81	87	—	— (Note: "Sky Full of Song" did not enter the Ultratop 50, but peaked at number 22 on the Flemish Ultratip chart.)	— (Note: "Sky Full of Song" did not enter the Billboard Canadian Hot 100, but peaked at number 15 on the Canadian Digital Song Sales chart.)	—	—	— (Note: "Sky Full of Song" did not enter the NZ Top 40 Singles Chart, but peaked at number 6 on the NZ Heatseeker Singles Chart.)	—	— (Note: "Sky Full of Song" did not enter the Billboard Hot 100, but peaked at number 26 on the Digital Song Sales chart.)		High as Hope
"Hunger"	2018	41	92	—	42	— (Note: "Hunger" did not enter the Billboard Canadian Hot 100, but peaked at number 30 on the Canadian Digital Song Sales chart.)	—	46	— (Note: "Hunger" did not enter the NZ Top 40 Singles Chart, but peaked at number 6 on the NZ Heatseeker Singles Chart.)	—	— (Note: "Hunger" did not enter the Billboard Hot 100, but peaked at number 17 on the Bubbling Under Hot 100 Singles chart.)	BPI: Gold; ARIA: Platinum; MC: Gold; RIAA: Gold; RMNZ: Gold	High as Hope
"Patricia"	2018	98	—	—	— (Note: "Patricia" did not enter the Ultratop 50, but peaked at number 16 on the Flemish Ultratip chart.)	—	—	88	— (Note: "Patricia" did not enter the NZ Top 40 Singles Chart, but peaked at number 11 on the NZ Hot Singles Chart.)	—	—		High as Hope
"Moderation"	2019	— (Note: "Moderation" did not enter the UK Singles Chart, but peaked at number 43 on the UK Singles Downloads Chart.)	— (Note: "Moderation" did not enter the ARIA Singles Chart, but peaked at number 38 on the ARIA Digital Track Chart.)	—	— (Note: "Moderation" did not enter the Ultratop 50, but peaked at number 9 on the Flemish Ultratip chart.)	— (Note: "Moderation" did not enter the Billboard Canadian Hot 100, but peaked at number 42 on the Canadian Digital Song Sales chart.)	—	—	— (Note: "Moderation" did not enter the NZ Top 40 Singles Chart, but peaked at number 20 on the NZ Hot Singles Chart.)	—	— (Note: "Moderation" did not enter the Billboard Hot 100, but peaked at number 43 on the Digital Song Sales chart.)		Non-album single
"Jenny of Oldstones"	2019	71	— (Note: "Jenny of Oldstones" did not enter the ARIA Singles Chart, but peaked at number 21 on the ARIA Digital Track Chart.)	—	— (Note: "Jenny of Oldstones" did not enter the Ultratop 50, but peaked at number 17 on the Flemish Ultratip chart.)	— (Note: "Jenny of Oldstones" did not enter the Billboard Canadian Hot 100, but peaked at number 16 on the Canadian Digital Song Sales chart.)	— (Note: "Jenny of Oldstones" did not enter the German Singles Chart, but peaked at number 19 on the Deutsche Single Trend Chart.)	56	— (Note: "Jenny of Oldstones" did not enter the NZ Top 40 Singles Chart, but peaked at number 18 on the NZ Hot Singles Chart.)	74	— (Note: "Jenny of Oldstones" did not enter the Billboard Hot 100, but peaked at number 7 on the Digital Song Sales chart.)		Game of Thrones: Season 8
"Light of Love"	2020	— (Note: "Light of Love" did not enter the UK Singles Chart, but peaked at number 50 on the UK Singles Downloads Chart.)	— (Note: "Light of Love" did not enter the Australian ARIA Singles Chart but peaked at number 23 on the ARIA Digital Track Chart.)	—	— (Note: "Light of Love" did not enter the Ultratop 50, but peaked at number 25 on the Flemish Ultratip chart.)	—	—	—	— (Note: "Light of Love" did not enter the NZ Top 40 Singles Chart, but peaked at number 36 on the NZ Hot Singles Chart.)	—	— (Note: "Light of Love" did not enter the Billboard Hot 100, but peaked at number 28 on the Digital Song Sales chart.)		Non-album single
"Call Me Cruella"	2021	—	—	—	— (Note: "Call Me Cruella" did not enter the Ultratop 50, but charted as an "extra tip" on the Flemish Ultratip chart.)	—	—	—	—	—	—		Cruella
"King"	2022	54	— (Note: "King" did not enter the Australian ARIA Singles Chart but peaked at number 46 on the ARIA Digital Track Chart.)	—	—	—	—	37	— (Note: "King" did not enter the NZ Top 40 Singles Chart, but peaked at number 11 on the NZ Hot Singles Chart.)	—	—		Dance Fever
"My Love"	2022	51	— (Note: "My Love" did not enter the Australian ARIA Singles Chart but peaked at number 44 on the ARIA Digital Track Chart.)	—	—	—	— (Note: "My Love" did not enter the German Singles Chart, but peaked at number 62 on the Deutsche Download Singles Chart.)	43	— (Note: "My Love" did not enter the NZ Top 40 Singles Chart, but peaked at number 14 on the NZ Hot Singles Chart.)	—	—	BPI: Silver	Dance Fever
"Free"	2022	— (Note: "Free" did not enter the UK Singles Chart, but peaked at number 66 on the UK Singles Sales Chart.)	— (Note: "Free" did not enter the Australian ARIA Singles Chart but peaked at number 50 on the ARIA Digital Track Chart.)	—	—	—	— (Note: "Free" did not enter the German Singles Chart, but peaked at number 52 on the Deutsche Download Singles Chart.)	66	— (Note: "Free" did not enter the NZ Top 40 Singles Chart, but peaked at number 26 on the NZ Hot Singles Chart.)	—	—	BPI: Silver	Dance Fever
"Just a Girl"	2023	— (Note: "Just a Girl" did not enter the UK Singles Chart, but peaked at number 98 on the UK Singles Sales Chart.)	—	—	—	—	—	—	—	—	—		Yellowjackets
"Mermaids"	2023	95	—	—	—	—	—	88	— (Note: "Mermaids" did not enter the NZ Top 40 Singles Chart, but peaked at number 19 on the NZ Hot Singles Chart.)	—	—		Dance Fever (Complete Edition)
"White Cliffs of Dover"	2024	—	—	—	—	—	—	—	—	—	—		The New Look
"Everybody Scream"	2025	57	—	—	—	—	—	77	— (Note: "Everybody Scream" did not enter the NZ Top 40 Singles Chart, but peaked at number 13 on the NZ Hot Singles Chart.)	—	—		Everybody Scream
"One of the Greats"	2025	—	—	—	—	—	—	—	— (Note: "One of the Greats" did not enter the NZ Top 40 Singles Chart, but peaked at number 31 on the NZ Hot Singles Chart.)	—	—		Everybody Scream
"Sympathy Magic"	2025	62	—	—	—	—	—	68	— (Note: "Sympathy Magic" did not enter the NZ Top 40 Singles Chart, but peaked at number 5 on the NZ Hot Singles Chart.)	—	—		Everybody Scream
"—" denotes a recording that did not chart or was not released in that territory.

=== As featured artist ===
List of singles as featured artist, with selected chart positions, showing year released and album name
Title	Year	Peak chart positions					Certifications	Album
Title	Year	UK	UK Dance	IRL	NLD	US Dance	Certifications	Album
"Say My Name (remix)" (Morgan Seatree featuring Florence and the Machine)	2025	25	4	46	25	17	BPI: Platinum; BEA: Gold; RMNZ: Platinum	Non-album single

=== Promotional singles ===
List of promotional singles, with selected chart positions and certifications, showing year released and album name
Title	Year	Peak chart positions										Certifications	Album
Title	Year	UK	AUS	BEL (FL)	CAN	FRA	IRL	NZ	POR	SCO	US	Certifications	Album
"What the Water Gave Me"	2011	24	35	— (Note: "What the Water Gave Me" did not enter the Ultratop 50, but peaked at number 2 on the Flemish Ultratip chart.)	72	—	13	15	29	24	91	ARIA: Gold; RIAA: Gold	Ceremonials
"Breaking Down"	2012	—	—	—	—	—	—	—	—	—	—		Ceremonials
"Over the Love"	2013	—	—	—	—	—	—	—	—	—	—		The Great Gatsby
"Stand by Me"	2016	—	—	2	—	162	—	—	—	—	—		Songs from Final Fantasy XV
"Big God"	2018	97	—	— (Note: "Big God" did not enter the Ultratop 50, but charted as an "extra tip" on the Flemish Ultratip chart.)	—	—	80	—	—	—	—		High as Hope
"Heaven Is Here"	2022	—	—	—	—	—	—	—	—	—	—		Dance Fever
"Morning Elvis" (Live at Denver Ball Arena) (with Ethel Cain)	2022	—	—	—	—	—	—	—	—	—	—		Non-album promotional single
"Everybody Scream – Live"	2026	-	-	-	-	-		Everybody Scream:Live Tour					
"—" denotes a recording that did not chart or was not released in that territory.

== Other charted and certified songs ==
List of songs, with selected chart positions and certifications, showing year released and album name
Title	Year	Peak chart positions										Certifications	Album
Title	Year	UK	AUS	BEL (FL)	CAN	FRA	NZ	POR	SWE	US	WW	Certifications	Album
"Seven Devils"	2012	—	—	—	—	—	—	—	—	—	—	RIAA: Gold	Ceremonials
"St. Jude"	2015	156	90	—	—	—	—	—	—	—	—		How Big, How Blue, How Beautiful
"How Big, How Blue, How Beautiful"	2015	— (Note: "How Big, How Blue, How Beautiful" did not enter the UK Singles Chart, but peaked at number 76 on the UK Streaming Chart.)	—	—	—	—	—	—	—	—	—		How Big, How Blue, How Beautiful
"Too Much Is Never Enough"	2016	135	—	—	—	173	—	—	—	—	—		Songs from Final Fantasy XV
"June"	2018	—	—	—	—	—	— (Note: "June" did not enter the NZ Top 40 Singles Chart, but peaked at number 19 on the NZ Hot Singles Chart.)	—	—	—	—		High as Hope
"South London Forever"	2018	—	—	—	—	—	— (Note: "South London Forever" did not enter the NZ Top 40 Singles Chart, but peaked at number 15 on the NZ Hot Singles Chart.)	—	—	—	—		High as Hope
"Choreomania"	2022	—	—	—	—	—	— (Note: "Choreomania" did not enter the NZ Top 40 Singles Chart, but peaked at number 14 on the NZ Hot Singles Chart.)	—	—	—	—		Dance Fever
"Dream Girl Evil"	2022	— (Note: "Dream Girl Evil" did not enter the UK Singles Chart, but peaked at number 100 on the UK Singles Downloads Chart.)	—	—	—	—	— (Note: "Dream Girl Evil" did not enter the NZ Top 40 Singles Chart, but peaked at number 10 on the NZ Hot Singles Chart.)	—	—	—	—		Dance Fever
"Girls Against God"	2022	—	—	—	—	—	— (Note: "Girls Against God" did not enter the NZ Top 40 Singles Chart, but peaked at number 17 on the NZ Hot Singles Chart.)	—	—	—	—		Dance Fever
"Florida!!!" (Taylor Swift featuring Florence and the Machine)	2024	— (Note: "Florida!!!" did not enter the UK Singles Chart, but peaked at number 12 on the UK Streaming Chart.)	8	36	9	80	9	18	33	8	8	BPI: Silver; ARIA: Platinum; RMNZ: Gold	The Tortured Poets Department
"Reflections Laughing" (with the Weeknd and Travis Scott)	2025	— (Note: "Reflections Laughing" did not enter the UK Singles Chart, but peaked at number 72 on the UK Streaming Chart.)	75	—	29	44	— (Note: "Reflections Laughing" did not enter the NZ Top 40 Singles Chart, but peaked at number five on the NZ Hot Singles Chart.)	—	82	53	38		Hurry Up Tomorrow
"Witch Dance"	2025	—	—	—	—	—	— (Note: "Witch Dance" did not enter the NZ Top 40 Singles Chart, but peaked at number 19 on the NZ Hot Singles Chart.)	—	—	—	—		Everybody Scream
"Buckle"	2025	75	—	—	—	—	— (Note: "Buckle" did not enter the NZ Top 40 Singles Chart, but peaked at number 16 on the NZ Hot Singles Chart.)	—	—	—	—		Everybody Scream
"—" denotes a recording that did not chart or was not released in that territory.

== Guest appearances ==
List of non-single guest appearances, showing year released and album name
Title	Year	Album
"Halo"	2009	Radio 1's Live Lounge – Volume 4
"Not Fade Away"	2011	Rave On Buddy Holly
"Take Care"	2012	BBC Radio 1's Live Lounge 2012
"When In Disgrace With Fortune and Men’s Eyes (Sonnet 29)"	2016	Take All My Loves - 9 Shakespeare Sonnets
"Tiny Dancer"	2018	Revamp: Reimagining the Songs of Elton John & Bernie Taupin
"Florida!!!" (Taylor Swift featuring Florence and the Machine)	2024	The Tortured Poets Department
"Reflections Laughing" (with the Weeknd and Travis Scott)	2025	Hurry Up Tomorrow
"Never Felt Better" (with Everything Is Recorded and Sampha)	2025	Temporary

== Music videos ==
List of music videos, showing year released and directors
Title	Year	Director(s)	Ref.
"Kiss with a Fist"	2008	Price James	
"Dog Days Are Over"	2008	Tom Beard and Tabitha Denholm	
"Rabbit Heart (Raise It Up)"	2009	Tom Beard and Tabitha Denholm	
"Drumming Song"	2009	Dawn Shadforth	
"You've Got the Love"	2009	Tom Beard and Tabitha Denholm	
"Hurricane Drunk"	2010	Eva Husson	
"Dog Days Are Over" (2010 version)	2010	Georgie Greville & Geremy Jasper	
"Cosmic Love"	2010	Tom Beard and Tabitha Denholm	
"Heavy in Your Arms"	2010	Tom Beard and Tabitha Denholm	
"Not Fade Away"	2011	Tabitha Denholm	
"What the Water Gave Me"	2011	Tabitha Denholm	
"Shake It Out"	2011	Dawn Shadforth	
"No Light, No Light"	2011	Arni & Kinski	
"Never Let Me Go"	2012	Tabitha Denholm	
"Breath of Life"	2012	Scott Murray	
"Spectrum"	2012	David LaChapelle and John Byrne	
"Breaking Down"	2012	Tabitha Denholm	
"Lover to Lover"	2012	Vincent Haycock	
"How Big, How Blue, How Beautiful"	2015	Tabitha Denholm and Vincent Haycock	
"What Kind of Man"	2015	Vincent Haycock	
"St. Jude"	2015	Vincent Haycock	
"Ship to Wreck"	2015	Vincent Haycock	
"Queen of Peace" / "Long and Lost"	2015	Vincent Haycock	
"Delilah"	2015	Vincent Haycock	
"Third Eye"	2016	Vincent Haycock	
"Sky Full of Song"	2018	AG Rojas	
"Hunger"	2018	AG Rojas	
"Big God"	2018	Autumn de Wilde	
"South London Forever"	2018	AG Rojas	
"No Choir"	2018	AG Rojas	
"King"	2022	Autumn de Wilde	
"Heaven is Here"	2022	Autumn de Wilde	
"My Love"	2022	Autumn de Wilde	
"Free"	2022	Autumn de Wilde	
"Everybody Scream"	2025	Autumn de Wilde	
"One Of The Greats"	2025	Autumn de Wilde	
"Symphathy Magic"	2025	Autumn de Wilde	
"Buckle"	2025	Autumn de Wilde	
