= Lungs Tour =

2008–11 concert tour by Florence and the Machine

- Tour by Florence and the Machine
- Associated album: Lungs
- Start date: 1 February 2008
- End date: 6 July 2011
- Legs: 18
- No. of shows: 256
- Supporting acts: Golden Silvers; The xx; Parallels; Voicst; Frankie & the Heartstrings; The Temper Trap; Sian Alice Group; Holy Hail; Babe Shadow; The Drums; The Naked and Famous

Florence and the Machine concert chronology
- Lungs Tour (2008–11); Ceremonials Tour (2011–12)

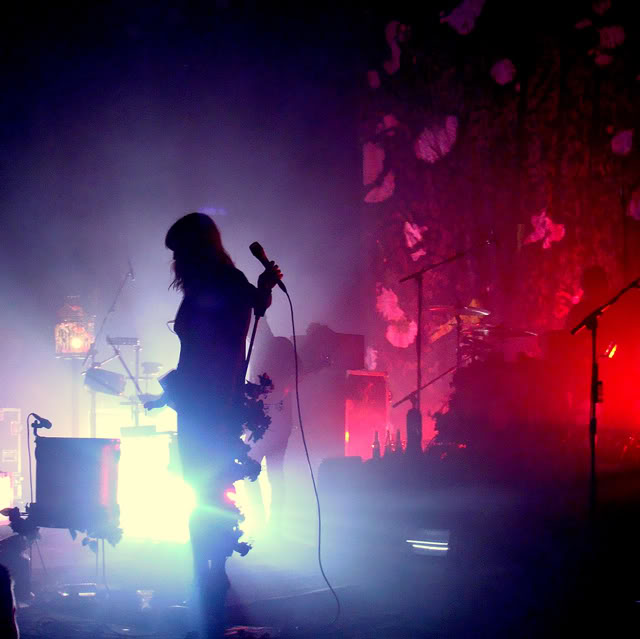
Performing at the O2 ABC Glasgow in 2009

The Lungs Tour was the first major headlining concert tour by English indie rock band Florence and the Machine, in support of their debut album, Lungs.

== Background ==
In July 2009, upon the release of their debut album, Florence and the Machine announced a six-date concert tour of the United Kingdom. Six soon became ten as four more dates (one in Glasgow, one in Bournemouth and two more for London's Shepherd's Bush Empire) were added. Following the success of the UK tour, with most tickets selling out, mainland European dates were added in countries such as the Netherlands and Italy, where the album also achieved moderate success. The tour also visited North America and held a one-off show in Tokyo. In an interview with Nick Grimshaw, Florence mentioned that her tour was going to be brought to Australia. They also supported U2 on their U2 360° Tour in 2011. After the continued success of Lungs and its new UK chart peak of number 1, Florence Welch announced another nine-date UK and Ireland tour, billed as The Cosmic Love Tour. Florence and The Machine's official website held an exclusive fan pre-sale event on 27 January 2010 and tickets were fully released on Friday, 29 January at 9 a.m. All tickets for all dates officially sold out.

Florence's costumes were designed by Gucci during the later parts of the tour.

== Setlist ==
=== Typical September setlist ===
A typical setlist in the first UK leg was:

1. "Kiss with a Fist"
2. "Bird Song"
3. "Girl With One Eye" (not performed at Bristol)
4. "My Boy Builds Coffins"
5. "Are You Hurting The One You Love?"
6. "I'm Not Calling You a Liar"
7. "Hurricane Drunk"
8. "Between Two Lungs"
9. "Dog Days Are Over"
10. Howl"
11. "Drumming Song"
12. "Cosmic Love"
13. "If I Had a Heart" (only performed at 27 September show in London)
14. "Blinding"
15. "Something's Got a Hold on Me" (a cappella)
16. "You've Got the Love"
17. "Rabbit Heart (Raise It Up)"

=== Typical October Mainland European setlist ===
The setlist in Cologne was:

1. "Bird Song"
2. "My Boy Builds Coffins"
3. "Kiss With a Fist"
4. "Are You Hurting The One You Love?"
5. "Hurricane Drunk"
6. "Between Two Lungs"
7. "Dog Days Are Over"
8. "Howl"
9. "Drumming Song"
10. "Cosmic Love"
11. "Blinding"
12. "You've Got the Love"
13. "Rabbit Heart (Raise It Up)"

=== Typical December setlist ===
The setlist in Manchester was:

1. "My Boy Builds Coffins"
2. "Kiss with a Fist"
3. "Are You Hurting The One You Love?"
4. "Hurricane Drunk"
5. "Between Two Lungs"
6. "Drumming Song"
7. "Hardest of Hearts"
8. "Cosmic Love"
9. "Blinding"
10. "I'm Not Calling You a Liar" (acoustic version)
11. "Falling"
12. "Howl"
13. "You've Got the Love"
14. "Dog Days Are Over"
15. "Rabbit Heart (Raise It Up)"

=== Typical Australasia setlist ===
The setlist at The Metro Theatre Australia was:

1. "My Boy Builds Coffins"
2. "Kiss with a Fist"
3. "Hurricane Drunk"
4. "Between Two Lungs"
5. "Drumming Song"
6. "Cosmic Love"
7. "If I Had A Heart" (Fever Ray cover)
8. "Blinding"
9. "I'm Not Calling You A Liar"
10. "Howl"
11. "Dog Days Are Over"
12. "You've Got the Love"
13. "Rabbit Heart (Raise It Up)"

=== Typical March 2010 Mainland European setlist ===
The setlist at Aula Magna, Lisbon was:

1. "Howl"
2. "Kiss with a Fist"
3. "Hurricane Drunk"
4. "My Boy Builds Coffins"
5. "Between Two Lungs"
6. "Hardest of Hearts"
7. "Drumming Song"
8. "Cosmic Love"
9. "Blinding"
10. "I'm Not Calling You A Liar"
11. "Dog Days Are Over"
12. "You've Got the Love"
13. "Rabbit Heart (Raise It Up)"

=== Typical March/April 2010 USA setlist ===
The setlist at Boston was:

1. "Howl"
2. "Kiss with a Fist"
3. "Hurricane Drunk"
4. "My Boy Builds Coffins"
5. "Between Two Lungs"
6. "Hardest of Hearts"
7. "Drumming Song"
8. "Cosmic Love"
9. "Blinding"
10. "I'm Not Calling You A Liar"
11. "Dog Days Are Over"
12. "You've Got the Love"
13. "Rabbit Heart (Raise It Up)"

=== Typical 'Cosmic Love Tour' setlist ===
The setlist in Dublin was:

1. "Howl"
2. "My Boy Builds Coffins"
3. "Hurricane Drunk" (Not performed on the rest of the tour)
4. "Girl With One Eye"
5. "Between Two Lungs"
6. "Hardest of Hearts" (Not performed on the rest of the tour)
7. "Drumming Song"
8. "Blinding"
9. "I'm Not Calling You A Liar"
10. "Swimming" (Debut live performance, not performed on 11 May)
11. "Cosmic Love"
12. "Strangeness & Charm" (New Song, debut live performance)
13. "You've Got the Love"
14. "Dog Days Are Over"
15. "Kiss with a Fist"
16. "Rabbit Heart (Raise It Up)"

== Support acts ==
- Golden Silvers (22 May 2009)
- The xx (17–29 September 2009)
- Parallels (1 November 2009)
- Voicst (Hamburg, Cologne, Berlin, Vienna, Munich and Zurich)
- Frankie & The Heartstrings (6–14 December 2009)
- The Temper Trap (6–14 December 2009)
- Sian Alice Group (20 February – 16 March 2010)
- Holy Hail (15–17 April 2010)
- Babe Shadow (5–15 May 2010)
- The Drums (5 May – 29 July 2010)
- The Naked and Famous (29 July 2010)

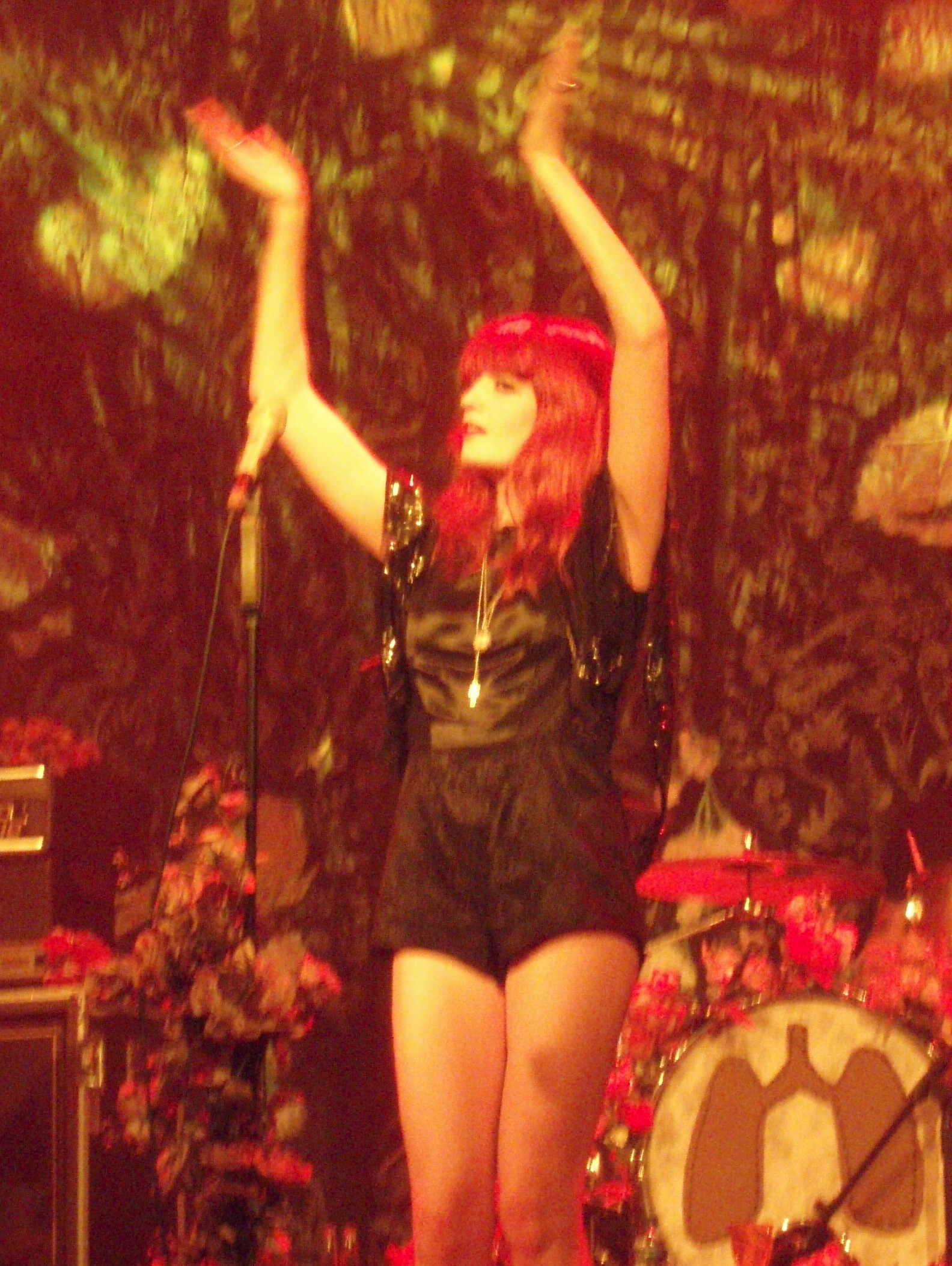
Lead singer Florence Welch performing at the tour stop at Melkweg in Amsterdam, Netherlands on October 8, 2009

== Tour dates ==
Date	City	Country	Venue
Europe
1 February 2008	Cambridge	England	Cambridge Barfly
28 February 2008	Bristol	England	Thekla
7 March 2008	Dublin	Ireland	Crawdaddy Club
17 March 2008	London	England	Cobden Club
18 April 2008	London	England	Camden Crawl
25 April 2008^{[A]}	Amsterdam	Netherlands	Paradiso
30 April 2008	Brussels	Belgium	Ancienne Belgique
2 May 2008	Cologne	Germany	Luxor
3 May 2008	Nijmegen	Netherlands	Doornroosje
9 May 2008	Edinburgh	Scotland	Liquid Rooms
17 May 2008	Manchester	England	Manchester Academy
21 May 2008	London	England	London Astoria
22 May 2008	Leeds	England	Cockpit
24 May 2008^{[B]}	Bristol	England	Carling Academy Bristol
25 May 2008^{[B]}	Nottingham	England	Nottingham Rock City
26 May 2008	Munich	Germany	59:1 Club
27 May 2008	Liverpool	England	Soundcity
1 June 2008	Middlesbrough	England	Middlesbrough Music Live
10 June 2008	London	England	229 Great Portland Street
21 June 2008	London	England	Serpentine Gallery
27 June 2008^{[C]}	Pilton	England	Worthy Farm
9 July 2008	London	England	Koko
18 July 2008^{[D]}	Dorset	England	Lulworth Castle
24 July 2008	Huntingdon	England	Secret Garden Party
26 July 2008^{[E]}	London	England	Clapham Common
1 August 2008^{[F]}	London	England	Standon Standon Private Residence
8 August 2008^{[G]}	London	England	Victoria Park
22 August 2008^{[H]}	Leeds	England	Bramham Park
24 August 2008^{[H]}	Reading	England	Little John's Farm
29 August 2008^{[I]}	County Laois	Ireland	Stradbally Hall
5 September 2008^{[J]}	Isle of Wight	England	Robin Hill Country Park
19 September 2008^{[K]}	London	England	Bar Music Hall
8 October 2008	London	England	Koko
11 October 2008^{[L]}	London	England	Peninsula Square
15 October 2008^{[M]}	Reykjavík	Iceland	Iceland Airwaves Media Center
18 October 2008^{[N]}	London	England	Peninsula Square
28 October 2008	Brighton	England	Digital
29 October 2008	Brighton	England	Digital
30 October 2008	London	England	Bush Hall
2 November 2008	Lancaster	England	Lancaster Library
3 November 2008	Newcastle	England	The Other Rooms
5 November 2008	Edinburgh	Scotland	Cabaret Voltaire
7 November 2008	Manchester	England	The Warehouse Project
9 November 2008	London	England	Union Chapel
10 November 2008	Bristol	England	The Louisiana
11 November 2008	Nottingham	England	Bodega Social Club
13 November 2008	Sheffield	England	Sheffield University
14 November 2008	Dublin	Ireland	Tripod
2 December 2008	London	England	Pure Groove Records
19 December 2008	London	England	Camden Proud Galleries
29 January 2009^{[O]}	Liverpool	England	Liverpool University
30 January 2009^{[O]}	Glasgow	Scotland	O2 Academy Glasgow
31 January 2009 ^{[O]}	Glasgow	Scotland	O2 Academy Glasgow
1 February 2009^{[O]}	Newcastle	England	O2 Academy Newcastle
3 February 2009^{[O]}	Sheffield	England	O2 Academy Sheffield
4 February 2009^{[O]}	Birmingham	England	O2 Academy Birmingham
6 February 2009^{[O]}	Manchester	England	Manchester Academy
7 February 2009^{[O]}	Manchester	England	Manchester Academy
8 February 2009^{[O]}	Leeds	England	O2 Academy Leeds
10 February 2009^{[O]}	Lincoln	England	Engine Shed
11 February 2009^{[O]}	Nottingham	England	Rock City
12 February 2009^{[O]}	Norwich	England	Norwich UEA
14 February 2009^{[O]}	Cardiff	Wales	Cardiff University
15 February 2009^{[O]}	Bristol	England	O2 Academy Bristol
16 February 2009^{[O]}	Brighton	England	Brighton Dome
17 February 2009^{[O]}	Oxford	England	O2 Academy Oxford
19 February 2009^{[O]}	Portsmouth	England	Portsmouth Pyramids Centre
20 February 2009^{[O]}	Cambridge	England	Cambridge Corn Exchange
21 February 2009^{[O]}	London	England	Brixton Academy
28 February 2009	Colchester	England	Essex University
7 May 2009	London	England	Camden Proud Galleries
22 May 2009	Birmingham	England	O2 Academy2 Birmingham
27 May 2009	London	England	Bloomsbury Ballroom
28 May 2009	London	England	Bloomsbury Ballroom
31 May 2009	Glasgow	Scotland	Oran Mor
1 June 2009	Manchester	England	St. Phillips Church
2 June 2009	Brighton	England	Concorde 2
11 June 2009	Nelson	England	ACE Centre
12 June 2009^{[P]}	Athens	Greece	Technopolis
19 June 2009^{[Q]}	Tuttlingen	Germany	Neuhausen ob Eck Airfield
26 June 2009^{[R]}	Manchester	England	Manchester Evening News Arena
27 June 2009^{[C]}	Pilton	England	Worthy Farm
3 July 2009^{[R]}	London	England	Hyde Park
4 July 2009^{[S]}	Kent	England	The Hop Farm Country Park
5 July 2009^{[T]}	Belfort	France	Malsaucy Nature Reserve
6 July 2009	London	England	Rough Trade East
7 July 2009	London	England	Rivoli Ballroom
10 July 2009^{[U]}	Cornwall	England	Eden Project
11 July 2009^{[V]}	Kinross	Scotland	Balado Airfield
12 July 2009^{[W]}	County Kildare	Ireland	Punchestown Racecourse
18 July 2009^{[X]}	London	England	Victoria Park
19 July 2009^{[Y]}	Weston-super-Mare	England	Weston-super-Mare Beach
24 July 2009^{[D]}	Dorset	England	Lulworth Castle
29 July 2009^{[Z]}	London	England	Underground Village
13 August 2009^{[AA]}	Oslo	Norway	Middelalderparken
14 August 2009^{[AB]}	Gothenburg	Sweden	Slottsskogen
15 August 2009^{[AC]}	Copenhagen	Denmark	Valbyparken
16 August 2009^{[AB]}	Gothenburg	Sweden	Slottsskogen
22 August 2009^{[AD]}	Kiewit	Belgium	Kempische Steenweg
23 August 2009^{[AE]}	Biddinghuizen	Netherlands	Biddinghuizen Festival Grounds
28 August 2009^{[H]}	Reading	England	Little John's Farm
30 August 2009^{[H]}	Leeds	England	Bramham Park
6 September 2009^{[I]}	County Laois	Ireland	Stradbally Hall
10 September 2009^{[AF]}	Hull	England	Queen's Gardens
11 September 2009^{[J]}	Isle of Wight	England	Robin Hill Country Park
17 September 2009	Bristol	England	O_{2} Academy Bristol
18 September 2009	Bournemouth	England	Bournemouth Opera House
20 September 2009	Birmingham	England	O_{2} Academy Birmingham
21 September 2009	Leeds	England	O_{2} Academy Leeds
23 September 2009	Glasgow	Scotland	O_{2} ABC Glasgow
24 September 2009	Newcastle	England	O_{2} Academy Newcastle
25 September 2009	Manchester	England	Manchester Academy
27 September 2009	London	England	Shepherd's Bush Empire
28 September 2009	London	England	Shepherd's Bush Empire
29 September 2009	London	England	Shepherd's Bush Empire
5 October 2009	Hamburg	Germany	Logo
6 October 2009	Cologne	Germany	Luxor
7 October 2009	Brussels	Belgium	Botanique Orangerie
8 October 2009	Amsterdam	Netherlands	Melkweg
10 October 2009	Oslo	Norway	Parkteatret
11 October 2009	Copenhagen	Denmark	Vega
12 October 2009	Berlin	Germany	Frannz Club
14 October 2009	Vienna	Austria	Flex
15 October 2009	Munich	Germany	59:1 Club
16 October 2009	Milan	Italy	Magazzini Generali
17 October 2009	Zürich	Switzerland	Mascotte
22 October 2009^{[AG]}	London	England	Roundhouse
North America
27 October 2009	New York City	United States	Bowery Ballroom
30 October 2009	Los Angeles	United States	The Troubadour
1 November 2009	Montreal	Canada	Cabaret
2 November 2009	Toronto	Canada	Mod Club Theatre
Europe
6 November 2009	Lille	France	Aeronef
7 November 2009	Paris	France	La Cigale
8 November 2009^{[AH]}	Nantes	France	Nantes Olympic
10 November 2009^{[AH]}	Toulouse	France	Le Bikini
22 November 2009^{[AI]}	London	England	Union Chapel
27 November 2009^{[AJ]}	London	England	Tabernacle
29 November 2009^{[AK]}	London	England	Earls Court Exhibition Centre
5 December 2009	Cork	Ireland	Cork Opera House
6 December 2009	Belfast	Northern Ireland	Ulster Hall
7 December 2009	Dublin	Ireland	Olympia Theatre
9 December 2009	Glasgow	Scotland	O_{2} Academy Glasgow
10 December 2009	Manchester	England	Manchester Apollo
11 December 2009	Lincoln	England	Engine Shed
13 December 2009	London	England	Brixton Academy
14 December 2009	London	England	Brixton Academy
Oceania
26 January 2010	Sydney	Australia	The Metro Theatre
27 January 2010	Sydney	Australia	The Metro Theatre
29 January 2010^{[AL]}	Brisbane	Australia	Alexandria Street
30 January 2010^{[AL]}	Melbourne	Australia	Footscray Community Arts Center
31 January 2010^{[AL]}	Sydney	Australia	Sydney College of the Arts
1 February 2010^{[AL]}	Auckland	New Zealand	Silo Park
3 February 2010	Melbourne	Australia	Palace Theatre
5 February 2010^{[AL]}	Adelaide	Australia	Fowler's Live And Unisa West Courtyards
6 February 2010^{[AL]}	Perth	Australia	Perth Cultural Centre
Asia
7 February 2010^{[AL]}	Kallang	Singapore	Fort Canning
Europe
20 February 2010	The Hague	Netherlands	Paard Van Troje
21 February 2010	Ghent	Belgium	Vooruit
22 February 2010	Amsterdam	Netherlands	Paradiso
24 February 2010	Paris	France	Bataclan Theatre
25 February 2010	Frankfurt	Germany	Batschkapp
26 February 2010	Berlin	Germany	Astra
28 February 2010	Copenhagen	Denmark	Vega
1 March 2010	Oslo	Norway	Rockefeller
2 March 2010	Stockholm	Sweden	Debaser Medis
3 March 2010	Helsinki	Finland	Tavastia Club
6 March 2010	Warsaw	Poland	Stodoła
7 March 2010	Vienna	Austria	Vienna Indoor Arena
9 March 2010	Bologna	Italy	Estragon
10 March 2010	Zurich	Switzerland	Rohstofflager
11 March 2010	Lyon	France	Transbordeur
13 March 2010	Barcelona	Spain	Bikini
15 March 2010	Madrid	Spain	Heineken
16 March 2010	Lisbon	Portugal	Aula Magna
North America
5 April 2010	Philadelphia	United States	The TLA
6 April 2010	Washington, D.C.	United States	9:30 Club
7 April 2010	Boston	United States	Paradise Rock Club
8 April 2010	New York City	United States	La Poisson Rouge
9 April 2010	New York City	United States	Terminal 5
10 April 2010	Toronto	Canada	Phoenix Concert Theatre
12 April 2010	Chicago	United States	House of Blues
14 April 2010	Vancouver	Canada	Commodore Ballroom
15 April 2010	Seattle	United States	Showbox @ The Market
16 April 2010^{[AM]}	Indio	United States	Empire Polo Club
17 April 2010	San Francisco	United States	Mezzanine
The Cosmic Love Tour (Europe)
2 May 2010	Dublin	Ireland	Olympia Theatre
3 May 2010	Dublin	Ireland	Olympia Theatre
5 May 2010	Edinburgh	Scotland	Edinburgh Corn Exchange
6 May 2010	Edinburgh	Scotland	Edinburgh Corn Exchange
7 May 2010	Blackpool	England	Empress Ballroom
9 May 2010	Blackpool	England	Empress Ballroom
10 May 2010	Wolverhampton	England	Wolverhampton Civic Hall
11 May 2010	Wolverhampton	England	Wolverhampton Civic Hall
13 May 2010	London	England	Hammersmith Apollo
14 May 2010	London	England	Hammersmith Apollo
15 May 2010	London	England	Hammersmith Apollo
22 May 2010^{[AN]}	Bangor	England	Faenol Estate
26 May 2010	Ljubljana	Slovenia	Kino Šiška
27 May 2010^{[AO]}	Barcelona	Spain	Parc del Fòrum
28 May 2010^{[AP]}	Landgraaf	Netherlands	Megaland Park
5 June 2010^{[AQ]}	Kent	England	University of Kent
9 June 2010^{[AR]}	Swansea	Wales	University of Swansea
10 June 2010	Cardiff	Wales	Coopers Field
11 June 2010^{[AS]}	Isle of Wight	England	Seaclose Park
16 June 2010	Paris	France	L'Olympia
17 June 2010	Esch	Luxembourg	Kulturfabrik
18 June 2010^{[Q]}	Tuttlingen	Germany	Neuhausen ob Eck Airfield
19 June 2010^{[AT]}	Scheeßel	Germany	Eichenring Scheeßel
25 June 2010^{[AU]}	Paris	France	Hippodrome de Longchamp
26 June 2010^{[C]}	Pilton	England	Worth Farm
29 June 2010^{[AV]}	Arendal	Norway	Hovescenen
1 July 2010^{[AW]}	Roskilde	Denmark	Dyrskuepladsen
3 July 2010^{[AX]}	Werchter	Belgium	Werchter Festival Grounds
4 July 2010^{[AY]}	Arras	France	Citadelle Vauban
8 July 2010^{[AZ]}	Algés	Portugal	Passeio Marítimo de Alges
9 July 2010^{[V]}	Kinross	Scotland	Balado Airfield
10 July 2010^{[W]}	County Kildare	Ireland	Punchestown Racecourse
11 July 2010^{[BA]}	Turku	Finland	Ruissalo Island
15 July 2010^{[BB]}	London	England	Somerset House
16 July 2010^{[BC]}	Suffolk	England	Henham Park
21 July 2010	Milan	Italy	Arena Civica
22 July 2010	Rome	Italy	Auditorium Parco della Musica
Oceania
29 July 2010^{[BD]}	Auckland	New Zealand	Trusts Stadium
30 July 2010^{[BD]}	Woodford	Australia	Woodford Amphitheatre
2 August 2010	Melbourne	Australia	Festival Hall
3 August 2010	Melbourne	Australia	Festival Hall
5 August 2010	Sydney	Australia	Enmore Theatre
6 August 2010	Sydney	Australia	Enmore Theatre
7 August 2010	Sydney	Australia	Enmore Theatre
8 August 2010	Sydney	Australia	Hordern Pavilion
10 August 2010	Perth	Australia	Challenge Stadium
Europe
19 August 2010^{[BE]}	Belfast	Northern Ireland	Custom House Square
21 August 2010^{[BF]}	Chelmsford	England	Hylands Park
22 August 2010^{[BF]}	Staffordshire	England	Weston Park
24 August 2010	Ibiza	Spain	San Antonio
North America
30 October 2010^{[BG]}	New Orleans	United States	New Orleans City Park
31 October 2010	Boston	United States	House of Blues
1 November 2010	New York City	United States	Terminal 5
2 November 2010	New York City	United States	Terminal 5
3 November 2010	Toronto	Canada	The Sound Academy
5 November 2010	Oakland	United States	Fox Oakland Theatre
6 November 2010	Los Angeles	United States	The Wiltern
7 November 2010	Los Angeles	United States	The Wiltern
8 November 2010	Los Angeles	United States	The Wiltern
12 June 2011	Berkeley	United States	Hearst Greek Theatre
13 June 2011	Los Angeles	United States	Greek Theater
13 June 2011	Los Angeles	United States	Greek Theater
17 June 2011	Apple Valley	United States	Zoo Amphitheater
18 June 2011	Chicago	United States	Aragon Ballroom
20 June 2011	Philadelphia	United States	Festival Pier
22 June 2011^{[BH]}	Baltimore	United States	M&T Bank Stadium
23 June 2011	Boston	United States	Bank of America Pavilion
24 June 2011	New York City	United States	Rumsey Playfield
26 June 2011^{[BH]}	East Lansing	United States	Spartan Stadium
29 June 2011^{[BH]}	Miami	United States	Sun Life Stadium
30 June 2011	Orlando	United States	Hard Rock Live Orlando
1 July 2011	Atlanta	United States	Fox Theatre
2 July 2011^{[BH]}	Nashville	United States	Vanderbilt Stadium
4 July 2011	Indianapolis	United States	White River State Park
6 July 2011^{[BI]}	Milwaukee	United States	Marcus Amphitheater

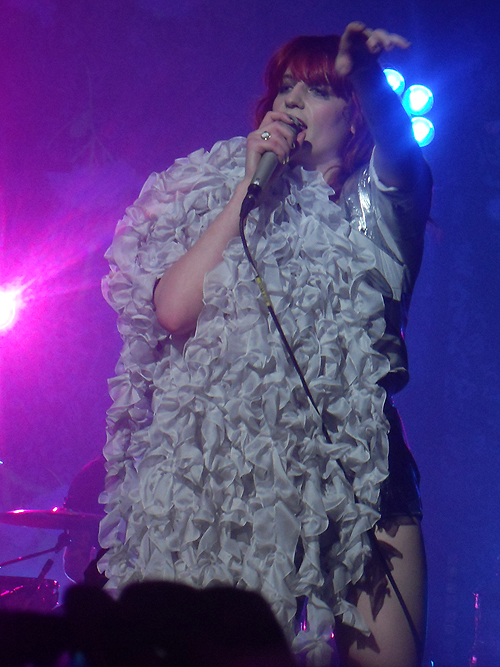
The tour stops at O2 Academy, Brixton on December 13, 2009

Festivals and other miscellaneous performances
^{A} This concert was a part of "London Calling at Paradiso"
^{B} This concert was a part of "Dot To Dot Festival"
^{C} This concert was a part of "Glastonbury Festival"
^{D} This concert was a part of "Camp Bestival"
^{E} This concert was a part of "Ben & Jerry's Sundae on the Common"
^{F} This concert was a part of "Standon Calling"
^{G} This concert was a part of "Underage Festival"
^{H} This concert was a part of "Reading and Leeds Festival"
^{I} This concert was a part of "Electric Picnic"
^{J} This concert was a part of "Bestival"
^{K} This concert was a part of "London Airwaves"
^{L} This concert was a part of "The Diesel XxX Party! at Matter"
^{M} This concert was a part of "Iceland Airwaves"
^{N} This concert was a part of "Moshi Moshi 10th Birthday at Matter"
^{O} This concert was a part of "NME Awards Tour 2009"
^{P} This concert was a part of "Synch Festival"
^{Q} This concert was a part of "Southside Festival"
^{R} This concert was a part of a show with Blur
^{S} This concert was a part of "Hop Farm Festival"
^{T} This concert was a part of "Eurockéennes"
^{U} This concert was a part of "Eden Sessions", with Paul Weller
^{V} This concert was a part of "T in the Park"
^{W} This concert was a part of "Oxegen"
^{X} This concert was a part of "Lovebox Festival"
^{Y} This concert was a part of "T4 on the Beach"
^{Z} This concert was a part of "Vauxhall Skate"
^{AA} This concert was a part of "Øyafestivalen"
^{AB} This concert was a part of "Way Out West Festival"
^{AC} This concert was a part of "Beatday Festival"
^{AD} This concert was a part of "Pukkelpop"
^{AE} This concert was a part of "Lowlands"

^{AF} This concert was a part of "Freedom Festival"
^{AG} This concert was a part of "BBC Electric Proms"
^{AH} This concert was a part of "Inrockuptibles Festival"
^{AI} This concert was a part of "BBC Radio 1's Mencap Little Noise Sessions"
^{AJ} This concert was a part of "NME Calling 2009"
^{AK} This concert was a part of "T4 Stars of 2009"
^{AL} This concert was a part of "St Jerome's Laneway Festival"
^{AM} This concert was a part of "Coachella Valley Music and Arts Festival"
^{AN} This concert was a part of "Radio 1's Big Weekend"
^{AO} This concert was a part of "Primavera Sound Festival"
^{AP} This concert was a part of "Pinkpop Festival"
^{AQ} This concert was a part of "Kent University Summer Ball"
^{AR} This concert was a part of "Swansea University Summer Ball"
^{AS} This concert was a part of "Isle of Wight Festival"
^{AT} This concert was a part of "Hurricane Festival"
^{AU} This concert was a part of "Solidays at Hippodrome de Longchamp"
^{AV} This concert was a part of "Hove Festival"
^{AW} This concert was a part of "Roskilde Festival"
^{AX} This concert was a part of "Rock Werchter"
^{AY} This concert was a part of "Main Square Festival"
^{AZ} This concert was a part of "Optimus Alive!"
^{BA} This concert was a part of "Ruisrock"
^{BB} This concert was a part of "Somerset House Summer Series"
^{BC} This concert was a part of "Latitude Festival"
^{BD} This concert was a part of "Splendour in the Grass Sideshow "
^{BE} This concert was a part of "Belsonic"
^{BF} This concert was a part of "V Festival"
^{BG} This concert was a part of "Voodoo Experience"
^{BH} The band supported U2 at this concert
^{BI} This concert was a part of "Summerfest"
