= Tabitha Denholm =

British director

Tabitha Denholm (born 14 January 1975) is a British director of music videos, documentary shorts and commercials. Denholm was a member of DJ duo Queens of Noize and later became art director for Florence and the Machine. Her work has been nominated for MTV Video Music Awards. She currently lives in Los Angeles.

== Life and career ==
At age 14, Denholm signed with Storm Model Management. As a model, she appeared in videos by Pulp and Ace of Base. Denholm later got a degree in cultural studies from the University of North London.

After meeting DJ Mairead Nash at a party, Denholm formed the DJ duo Queens of Noize and, with Nash, presented on MTV2 and BBC 6 Music and worked with The Libertines. After Queens of Noize disbanded, Mairead Nash became the manager for Florence and the Machine and Denholm became art director, after meeting vocalist Florence Welch and booking her for Queens of Noize's Christmas party. Denholm co-directed with Tom Beard several singles from Lungs including "Dog Days Are Over," "Rabbit Heart (Raise it Up)" and "You've Got the Love." These videos were nominated for several 2009 VMAs. She has since directed videos for artists including Haim, Julia Michaels, Of Monsters and Men and Ladyhawke. In 2015, Denholm's video for Jennifer Hudson's "I Still Love You" was nominated for the Video with a Social Message VMA.

In 2016, after watching a documentary about director and screenwriter Frances Marion, Denholm started the Women Under The Influence collective to support female directors.

== Personal life ==
Denholm dated Pete Doherty during the Libertines' early years.

== Filmography ==
=== Music videos ===
==== 2009 ====
- "Dog Days Are Over" - Florence and the Machine
- "Rabbit Heart (Raise It Up)" - Florence and the Machine
- "You've Got the Love" - Florence and the Machine

==== 2010 ====
- "Cosmic Love" - Florence and the Machine

==== 2011 ====
- "Not Fade Away" - Florence and the Machine

==== 2012 ====
- "Black White & Blue" - Ladyhawke
- "Breaking Down" - Florence and the Machine
- "Never Let Me Go" - Florence and the Machine

==== 2013 ====
- "Solemn Skies" - Childhood
- "Falling" - Haim
- "From a Window Seat" - Dawes
- "Wild Child" - Juliet Simms

==== 2014 ====
- "Masterpiece - Jessie J
- "Wasted" - Tiësto feat. Matthew Koma
- "Wasted Love" - Matt McAndrew

==== 2015 ====
- "Empire" - Of Monsters and Men
- "How Big, How Blue, How Beautiful" - Florence and the Machine
- "I Still Love You" - Jennifer Hudson

==== 2017 ====
- "I Know A Place" - MUNA
- "Issues" - Julia Michaels
- "Wearing Nothing" - Dagny

=== Documentary shorts ===
==== 2010 ====
- "Florence Welch: Letter from LA"

==== 2013 ====
- "Haim: Desert Days"

==== 2014 ====
- "Dickie Landry: New York Stories"

==== 2018 ====
- "Camila Cabello: Made in Miami (Artist Spotlight Story)"
