= Lungs (album) =

- Standard edition cover (Note: The Between Two Lungs reissue features the same picture with desaturated colors than the original while the Lungs: B-Sides cover includes a photograph of Welch in the You've Got the Love music video. The tenth anniversary cover shows a smaller photograph of Welch in a different position, and is surrounded by a salmon pink background.)

Studio album by Florence and the Machine
- Released: 3 July 2009
- Recorded: 2007–2009
- Studios: The Garden (London) (Note: Track 1); The Pool (London) (Note: Tracks 2, 4, 6, 9, 11 and 12); The Synagogue (Note: Tracks 3 and 8); Strongroom 33 / Space Cave (Note: Track 7); The Smokehouse (London) (Note: Track 10); The Dairy (London) (Note: Track 13)
- Genres: Indie rock; indie pop; baroque pop; art rock; art pop; alternative rock; soul
- Length: 46:11
- Label: Island
- Producers: Paul Epworth; James Ford; Charlie Hugall; Stephen Mackey; Isabella Summers; Eg White

Florence and the Machine chronology
A Lot of Love. A Lot of Blood (2009)	Lungs (2009)	Live at the Wiltern (2011)

Singles from Lungs
- 1. "Kiss with a Fist" Released: 9 June 2008; 2. "Dog Days Are Over" Released: 1 December 2008; 3. "Rabbit Heart (Raise It Up)" Released: 22 June 2009; 4. "Drumming Song" Released: 13 September 2009; 5. "You've Got the Love" Released: 16 November 2009; 6. "Cosmic Love" Released: 5 July 2010

Lungs is the debut studio album by the English indie rock band Florence and the Machine, released on 3 July 2009 by Island Records. After working on various projects, Florence Welch formed a band which included Robert Ackroyd, Chris Hayden, Mark Saunders, Tom Monger, and former collaborator Isabella Summers. The album features production from James Ford, Paul Epworth, Stephen Mackey, Eg White and Charlie Hugall, with additional production by band member Isabella Summers. The album has been reissued several times: an expanded version titled Between Two Lungs (2010), a digital EP subtitled The B-Sides (2011), and a Tenth Anniversary Edition (2019).

Lungs received generally positive reviews from music critics, with Welch drawing comparisons to the likes of Kate Bush and Fiona Apple. It appeared on several year-end critics' lists in late 2009. The album won the award for British Album of the Year at the Brit Awards. Commercially, Lungs reached number one in Poland and the United Kingdom, and number 14 in the US Billboard 200, selling over 3 million copies worldwide.

The album was supported by six singles, all of which were supplemented by accompanying music videos. "Kiss with a Fist" peaked at 51 in the United Kingdom while "Dog Days Are Over" and "Rabbit Heart (Raise It Up)" also charted in Australia and Belgium. Three further singles followed the release of the album, "Drumming Song", a cover of the song "You've Got the Love", and "Cosmic Love". Their cover of the Source and Candi Staton song became the group's first top-10 entry. To promote the album, Florence and the Machine embarked on the Lungs Tour between 2008 and 2011. A live album from this concert was released in 2010, titled Live at the Wiltern.

== Background and recording ==
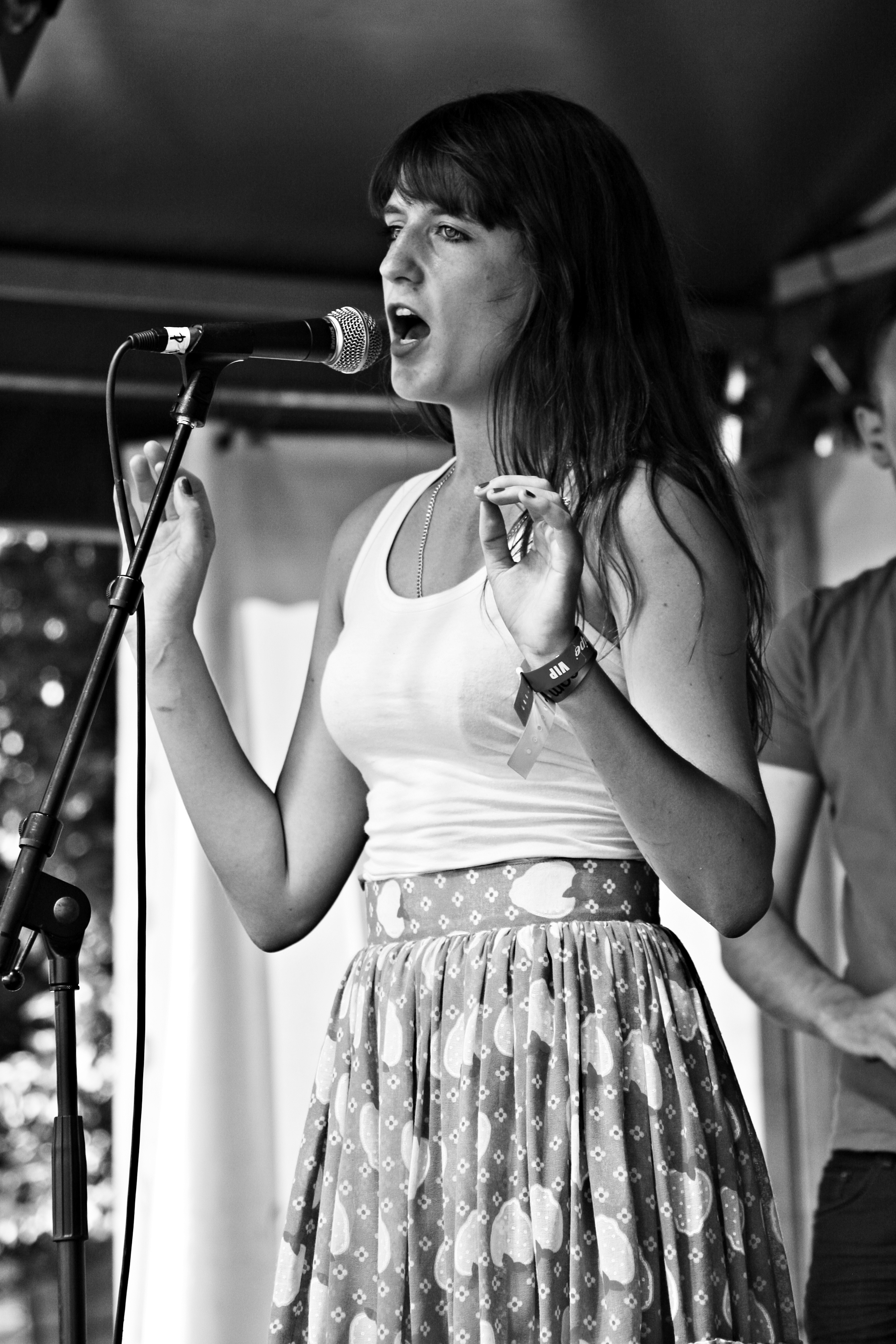
Florence Welch performing live in Shoreditch Park, London, 2007

Prior to recording Lungs, Florence Welch had considered or attempted several different projects in the music industry, including an interest in becoming a country singer, recording folk songs she had written, and collaborating with Razorlight's frontman Johnny Borrell, but ultimately she was unsatisfied with those endeavors. Welch and Borrell wrote several songs together. In 2007, Welch fronted the hip hop-influenced group Ashok, recording an early version of "Kiss with a Fist", titled "Happy Slap", for their debut studio album, Plans.

It was not until she began writing and recording with childhood friend Isabella Summers at Antenna Studios in London that Welch crafted a sound she wanted to develop further. Distraught but also inspired from a recently failed relationship, Welch recorded with "enthusiasm over skills", stating, "I'm quite glad I never learned to play the guitar, because I think I'd write songs that were more classically structured. As it is, I've had to create my own way of writing, which isn't typical. Everything's a big crescendo." For a brief while, Welch and Summers performed as a duo called Florence Robot/Isa Machine in small London venues. Over the coming months, Robert Ackroyd (guitar, backing vocals), Chris Hayden (drums, percussion, backing vocals), Mark Saunders (bass guitar, backing vocals) and Tom Monger (harp) were recruited to form a band, renamed Florence and the Machine. In November 2008, Welch signed a recording contract with Island Records. Prior to recording the album, Welch spent a long time honing her sound while working with guitarists, intent on "[making] it into something that was a wave of sound that would envelop, something that was soaring, slightly church-like and then-doomlike."

The band elected to record a shorter rendition of "Kiss with a Fist" as their debut single. Welch, however, began expanding upon the crude punk style which influenced "Kiss with a Fist" by listening to more contemporary music, particularly Arcade Fire's debut album Funeral (2004). The influence of the recordings would manifest itself on the concept she had devised for Lungs, which, according to Welch, was a "scrapbook of the past five years... it's about guilt, fear, love, death, violence, nightmares, [and] dreams". Ultimately, the majority of Welch's earlier compositions were rejected for the album—except "Kiss with a Fist" and "Between Two Lungs"—because they did not mesh well with the album's themes. Fortunately for the group, they rehearsed and improvised some of the material in the relaxed setting of Summers' studio, allowing Welch to refine the tribal drumming backdropping Lungs's tracks, most notably "Dog Days Are Over".

Florence and the Machine recorded Lungs in the United Kingdom with five different producers—Paul Epworth, James Ford, Stephen Mackey, Eg White, and Charlie Hugall. Most of the songs on the album were mixed by Cenzo Townshend. The album's sound is described as indie rock, indie pop, baroque pop, art rock, art pop, alternative rock and soul with influences of punk blues, electro-rock and garage rock.

=== Artwork ===
The imagery of Lungs, featuring a style derived from the Ante-Donatello Brotherhood, was handled by two of Welch's friends: photographer Tom Beard and art director Tabitha Denholm, who are partners at the studio Partizan. Denholm also plays with the band's manager Mairead Nash in the DJ duo Queens of Noize. For the album cover, Denholm created a concept built around a pair of lungs worn visibly on Welch's chest. Welch's personal stylist Aldene Johnson handled the wardrobe, "an Emma Cook chain dress that was in a kind of 1920s style", while Orlando Weeks, an art student and frontman of the band the Maccabees, built the prosthetic lungs, which he intended to give "a Victoriana, industrial punchbag kind of look".

== Release and promotion ==
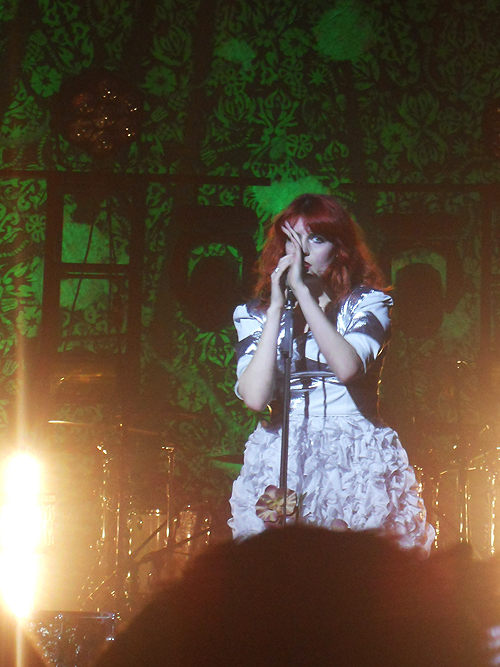
Florence and the Machine performing at Brixton Academy in December 2009

Florence and the Machine announced via their website on 24 September 2010 that Lungs would be re-released on 15 November as a two-disc package titled Between Two Lungs. The reissue features new sleeve art, liner notes by Welch, and a 12-track bonus disc including live versions, remixes, Welch's mashup collaboration with Dizzee Rascal, "You Got the Dirtee Love", and "Heavy in Your Arms", which was released as a single from the soundtrack to The Twilight Saga: Eclipse (2010). The live recordings are taken from the band's performance at the 2010 iTunes Festival, most of which were not previously available on the band's iTunes Festival: London 2010 EP.

On 27 February 2011, Lungs: The B-Sides was released exclusively in the United States to digital music retailers such as the iTunes Store and Amazon MP3. This was followed by the release of a deluxe edition of Lungs in the US on 26 April 2011, featuring all 11 tracks from Lungs: The B-Sides on a bonus disc to accompany the original 13-track album. On 3 July 2019, ten years after the original release of the album, the band announced that a limited "tenth anniversary edition" was available for pre-order. It was released digitally on 16 August, with the LPs and cassettes released the same day. An exclusive box set was released on 4 October. The box set comprises the original LP; a second LP with "three previously unreleased demo tracks, a rare acoustic version of "My Boy Builds Coffins", a cover of the Beatles' "Oh! Darling" Live at Abbey Road, and a number of B sides [and] rarities." It also includes "postcards and inserts, showcasing previously unseen images from the Lungs era" chosen by Welch herself.

=== Singles ===
"Kiss with a Fist" was released on 9 June 2008 as the lead single from Lungs, peaking at number 51 on the UK Singles Chart.

"Dog Days Are Over" was released on 1 December 2008 as the album's second single. While the 2010 reissue charted higher, the 2008 release only reached number 89 on the UK Singles Chart. The song was used in the theatrical trailer for the 2010 film Eat Pray Love, starring Julia Roberts. The Yeasayer remix of "Dog Days Are Over", which is included on Between Two Lungs, was released on 12 October 2010 on iTunes.

"Rabbit Heart (Raise It Up)" was released as the third single from the album on 22 June 2009, peaking at number 12 on the UK Singles Chart. "Drumming Song" was released as the album's fourth single on 7 September 2009, reaching number 54 in the UK.

"You've Got the Love" was the fifth single to be released from the album, and reached a new peak of number five on the UK Singles Chart in January 2010. The band had recorded a version of this the Source song which had been a live staple and issued it as a B-side to "Dog Days Are Over", but the success of the previous singles made Island request "You've Got the Love" as a single. Welch went on to record new vocal takes with engineer Cenzo Townshend, replacing the first two verses and the first chorus. Townshend also remixed the bass and drums to be "a bit harder and the bottom end a bit heavier." Florence and the Machine's duet with rapper Dizzee Rascal at the 2010 Brit Awards on 16 February 2010, a mashup of "You've Got the Love" and Dizzee Rascal's "Dirtee Cash" titled "You Got the Dirtee Love", was released on iTunes the day after the ceremony. "You Got the Dirtee Love" reached number two on the UK chart.

On 5 January 2010, "Hurricane Drunk" was originally announced as the sixth single from the album. A video for the song was filmed in Paris on 8 January 2010 and premiered on 29 January after the Celebrity Big Brother 2010 final on Channel 4. However, on 3 March 2010, a reissue of "Dog Days Are Over" was announced through the band's website. The single was released digitally on 11 April and as a seven-inch vinyl the following day, along with a new music video. It reached a peak of number 23 on the UK Singles Chart, later reaching a new peak of number 21 in 2023 following renewed interest in the track after its inclusion in Guardians of the Galaxy Vol.3.

"Cosmic Love" was released on 5 July 2010 as the album's sixth and final single. The song reached number 51 on the UK Singles Chart. The band made a guest appearance in the 7 February 2011 episode of Gossip Girl, titled "Panic Roommate", where they performed an acoustic rendition of "Cosmic Love".

== Critical reception ==
Professional ratings
Aggregate scores
Source	Rating
AnyDecentMusic?	7.3/10
Metacritic	79/100
Review scores
Source	Rating
AllMusic	4.5/5 stars
The A.V. Club	A−
Entertainment Weekly	A−
The Guardian	4/5 stars
NME	6/10
The Observer	4/5 stars
Pitchfork	7.2/10
Q	4/5 stars
Rolling Stone	3.5/5 stars
Spin	4/5 stars

Lungs received positive reviews from music critics. At Metacritic, which assigns a normalised rating out of 100 to reviews from mainstream publications, the album received an average score of 79, based on 22 reviews. James Christopher Monger of AllMusic praised it as "one of the most musically mature and emotionally mesmerizing albums of 2009" and stated, "With an arsenal of weaponry that included the daring musicality of Kate Bush, the fearless delivery of Sinéad O'Connor, and the dark, unhinged vulnerability of Fiona Apple, the London native crafted a debut that not only lived up to the machine-gun spray of buzz that heralded her arrival, but easily surpassed it." Ryan Dombal wrote for Pitchfork that Florence Welch "bursts mouth wide wide over garage rock, epic soul, pint-tipping Britbeat, and—best of all—a mystic brand of pop that's part Annie Lennox, Grace Slick, and Joanna Newsom." Q noted that "there's a lot going on, but Welch never confuses breadth with depth". Entertainment Weekly's Joseph Brannigan Lynch opined that Welch's "immaculately constructed indie pop recalls Regina Spektor, but without the studied artiness: Welch is more concerned with raw emotional release." Spin's Melissa Maerz stated, "From the way she sings, in big gulps and Teen Wolf growls, to the mystical art-rock ballads she bedazzles with sleigh bells, harps, and choirs, there's enough drama here for a Broadway musical. But her delivery is so raw that every mess feels genuine."

Rolling Stone's Jon Dolan expressed that "[t]he best bits feel like being chased through a moonless night by a sexy moor witch." Slant Magazine's Nick Day referred to the band's music as "particularly sensitive to studio gloss" and praised Welch's singing as "a fine balance between elegance and frenzy." In a review for The Guardian, Dave Simpson viewed that Welch "has created a sonic labyrinth of xylophones, percussion, Gregorian chants and werewolves. It can sound affected, occasionally crass, but there's enough adventure to make this worth backing for the Mercury." Jamie Fullerton of NME commended the work of producers James Ford and Paul Epworth, writing that they "create epic cauldron-swirls of Terminator-theme drums, Massive Attack atmospherics and twinkle-eye harp matched by Florence's grappling of skyward choruses", but found that "with the likes of 'I'm Not Calling You A Liar' and 'Howl' boasting similarly windy production yet no identifiable tunes the results sound aimless—if harmless." Genevieve Koski of The A.V. Club felt that "[a]t times, Lungs borders on exhausting, careening as it does from one over-the-top track to the next. [...] But with a voice as strong and emotive as hers, it's not surprising that Welch has little use for moments of quiet contemplation." Despite criticising instances of "over-smoothed" production on certain tracks, The Observer's Sheryl Garratt concluded that "there's a real joy about this debut. It's the sound of someone who has found their voice and is keen to use it – as loudly and freely as possible."

=== Accolades ===
Lungs was shortlisted for the 2009 Mercury Prize. The following year, the album won the MasterCard British Album award at the Brit Awards.

Publication	Accolade	Rank	Ref.
Clash	Top 40 Albums of 2009	13	
Consequence of Sound	The Top 100 Albums of '09	97	
Entertainment Weekly	10 Best (and 5 Worst) Albums of 2009	Best Debut	
The Guardian	Albums of 2009	6	
Mojo	Top 50 Albums of 2009	7	
musicOMH	Top 50 Best Albums of 2009	9	
NME	50 Best Albums of 2009	26	
Q	50 Best Albums of 2009	2	
Spin	The 40 Best Albums of 2009	8	
Uncut	50 Best Albums of 2009	16	

== Commercial performance ==
Lungs debuted at number two on the UK Albums Chart (behind Michael Jackson's 2005 compilation album The Essential Michael Jackson), selling 63,020 copies in its first week—the second highest amount for a debut album in 2009, after Susan Boyle's I Dreamed a Dream. On 17 January 2010, after spending 28 consecutive weeks in the top 40, the album topped the UK chart for the first time, selling 51,005 copies. It spent a second consecutive week atop the chart, with 42,359 copies sold. On 8 March 2019, Lungs was certified sextuple platinum by the British Phonographic Industry (BPI), and had sold 1,813,557 copies in the United Kingdom by August 2019.

Following the band's performance of "Dog Days Are Over" at the 2010 MTV Video Music Awards, Lungs jumped from number 44 to number 14 on the US Billboard 200 with sales of 21,000 copies, an increase of 165% from the previous week. The album was certified double platinum by the Recording Industry Association of America (RIAA) on 25 June 2018. It had sold 1,142,000 copies in the United States as of February 2013. Worldwide, Lungs had sold over three million copies as of November 2011.

== Track listing ==
No.	Title	Writer(s)	Producer(s)	Length
1.	"Dog Days Are Over"	Florence Welch; Isabella Summers	James Ford; Summers^{[a]}	4:13
2.	"Rabbit Heart (Raise It Up)"	Welch; Paul Epworth	Epworth	3:52
3.	"I'm Not Calling You a Liar"	Welch; Summers	Ford; Summers^{[a]}	3:05
4.	"Howl"	Welch; Epworth	Epworth	3:34
5.	"Kiss with a Fist"	Welch; Matt Allchin	Stephen Mackey	2:04
6.	"Girl with One Eye"	Allchin; David Ashby; James McCool	Mackey	3:39
7.	"Drumming Song"	Welch; Ford; Crispin Hunt	Ford	3:44
8.	"Between Two Lungs"	Welch; Summers	Ford; Summers^{[a]}	4:09
9.	"Cosmic Love"	Welch; Summers	Epworth; Summers^{[a]}	4:16
10.	"My Boy Builds Coffins"	Welch; Christopher Lloyd Hayden; Rob Ackroyd	Charlie Hugall; Mackey^{[b]}; Richard Flack^{[b]}	2:57
11.	"Hurricane Drunk"	Welch; Eg White	White; Epworth^{[a]}	3:13
12.	"Blinding"	Welch; Epworth	Epworth	4:36
13.	"You've Got the Love"	John Bellamy; Arnecia Michelle Harris; Anthony B. Stephens	Hugall	2:49

Japanese edition bonus tracks
No.	Title	Writer(s)	Producer(s)	Length
14.	"Bird Song Intro"	Ackroyd	Hugall	1:20
15.	"Bird Song"	Welch; Dev Hynes	Hugall	2:55
16.	"Are You Hurting the One You Love?"	Welch; Summers; Hayden; Tom Monger	Hugall	2:51
17.	"Falling"	Welch; Summers	Summers; Jimmy Robertson	3:33

iTunes Store deluxe edition bonus tracks
No.	Title	Writer(s)	Producer(s)	Length
14.	"Bird Song Intro"	Ackroyd	Hugall	1:20
15.	"Bird Song"	Welch; Hynes	Hugall	2:55
16.	"Dog Days Are Over" (demo)	Welch; Summers		3:35
17.	"Falling"	Welch; Summers	Summers; Robertson	3:33
18.	"Hardest of Hearts"	Welch; Mark-Anthony Tieku	Summers; Ford	3:26
19.	"Ghosts" ("I'm Not Calling You a Liar" demo)	Welch; Summers		2:58
20.	"Girl with One Eye" (Bayou Percussion Version)	Allchin; Ashby; McCool	Ford	3:55
21.	"Swimming"	Welch; James; Stafford; Mackey	Mackey; Flack	3:22
22.	"Dog Days Are Over" (music video)		Beard; Denholm; (directors)	3:55

Deluxe edition bonus disc
No.	Title	Writer(s)	Producer(s)	Length
1.	"Bird Song Intro"	Ackroyd	Hugall	1:20
2.	"Bird Song"	Welch; Dev Hynes	Hugall	2:55
3.	"Dog Days Are Over" (demo)			3:33
4.	"Falling"	Welch; Summers	Summers; Jimmy Robertson	3:35
5.	"Hardest of Hearts"	Welch; Mark-Anthony Tieku	Summers; Ford	3:25
6.	"Ghosts" ("I'm Not Calling You a Liar" demo)	Welch; Summers		2:58
7.	"Girl with One Eye" (Bayou Percussion Version)	Allchin; Ashby; McCool	Ford	3:55
8.	"Swimming" (Australian bonus track)	Welch; James; Stafford; Mackey	Mackey; Flack	3:23

Limited edition box set disc two: Live at Abbey Road
No.	Title	Writer(s)	Length
1.	"Between Two Lungs"	Welch; Summers	4:39
2.	"Kiss with a Fist"	Welch; Allchin	2:52
3.	"Hurricane Drunk"	Welch; White	3:29
4.	"Cosmic Love"	Welch; Summers	5:13
5.	"Oh! Darling"	Lennon–McCartney	3:18
6.	"Dog Days Are Over"	Welch; Summers	4:30
7.	"Drumming Song"	Welch; Ford; Hunt	4:51
8.	"You've Got the Love"	Bellamy; Harris; Stephens	3:45
9.	"Rabbit Heart (Raise It Up)"	Welch; Epworth	5:12

Limited edition box set disc three: Remixes, Covers and Rarities
No.	Title	Writer(s)	Producer(s)	Length
1.	"Halo" (recorded for Radio 1's Live Lounge)	Beyoncé Knowles; Ryan Tedder; Evan "Kidd" Bogart		3:51
2.	"Hurricane Drunk" (acoustic version)	Welch; White		2:53
3.	"You've Got the Love" (Fraser T. Smith's Mix)	Bellamy; Harris; Stephens	Hugall; Fraser T. Smith^{[d]}	2:47
4.	"Rabbit Heart (Raise It Up)" (P.E.S.T Remix)	Welch; Epworth	Epworth; P.E.S.T^{[c]}	6:06
5.	"Drumming Song" (Boy 8-Bit Remix)	Welch; Ford; Hunt	Ford; Boy 8-Bit^{[c]}	6:33
6.	"Flakes" (Mystery Jets cover)	Blaine Harrison; Kai Fish; Kapil Trivedi; William Rees		4:24
7.	"An Offering" ("Rabbit Heart (Raise It Up)" demo)	Welch; Epworth		3:53
8.	"You've Got the Love" (Steve Pitron & Max Sanna Remix)	Bellamy; Harris; Stephens	Steve Pitron; Max Sanna	6:25
9.	"Cosmic Love" (acoustic version)	Welch; Summers		4:49
10.	"Are You Hurting the One You Love?"	Welch; Summers; Hayden; Monger	Hugall	2:58
11.	"Swimming"	Welch; James; Mackey	Mackey; Flack	3:22

Limited edition box set bonus DVD
No.	Title	Length
1.	"Between Two Lungs" (live from Rivoli Ballroom)	4:00
2.	"My Boy Builds Coffins" (live from Rivoli Ballroom)	3:07
3.	"Kiss with a Fist" (live from Rivoli Ballroom)	2:11
4.	"Hurricane Drunk" (live from Rivoli Ballroom)	3:10
5.	"Cosmic Love" (live from Rivoli Ballroom)	4:49
6.	"Drumming Song" (live from Rivoli Ballroom)	4:38
7.	"Howl" (live from Rivoli Ballroom)	3:23
8.	"Blinding" (live from Rivoli Ballroom)	6:03
9.	"Dog Days Are Over" (live from Rivoli Ballroom)	4:50
10.	"Rabbit Heart (Raise It Up)" (live from Rivoli Ballroom)	4:43
11.	"You've Got the Love" (live from Rivoli Ballroom)	5:27
12.	"Cosmic Love" (recorded at the Rivoli Ballroom, 7 July 2009)	4:40
13.	"Between Two Lungs" (recorded at Metropolis Studios, 29 April 2009)	3:58
14.	"Dog Days Are Over" (recorded at Metropolis Studios, 29 April 2009)	4:41
15.	"Rabbit Heart (Raise It Up)" (recorded at Metropolis Studios, 29 April 2009)	4:01
16.	"Dog Days Are Over" (music video)	3:51
17.	"Rabbit Heart (Raise It Up)" (music video)	3:32
18.	"Drumming Song" (music video)	3:44
19.	"You've Got the Love" (music video)	2:44

Between Two Lungs bonus disc
No.	Title	Writer(s)	Producer(s)	Length
1.	"Heavy in Your Arms"	Welch; Epworth	Epworth	4:47
2.	"You Got the Dirtee Love" (live at the Brit Awards 2010 with Dizzee Rascal)	Bellamy; Harris; Stephens; Dylan Mills; Nick Cage	Hugall; Nick Detnon	3:41
3.	"Hurricane Drunk" (The Horrors Remix)	Welch; White	White; Epworth^{[a]}; The Horrors^{[c]}	5:45
4.	"Strangeness and Charm" (live from Hammersmith Apollo)	Welch; Epworth		5:49
5.	"Swimming" (live from Hammersmith Apollo)	Welch; James; Stafford; Mackey		3:31
6.	"Dog Days Are Over" (Yeasayer Remix)	Welch; Summers	Yeasayer^{[c]}	4:15
7.	"Drumming Song" (live from the iTunes Festival '10)	Welch; Ford; Hunt		4:41
8.	"Girl with One Eye" (live from the iTunes Festival '10)	Allchin; Ashby; McCool		3:49
9.	"Hurricane Drunk" (live from the iTunes Festival '10)	Welch; White		3:33
10.	"Dog Days Are Over" (live from the iTunes Festival '10)	Welch; Summers		4:15
11.	"My Boy Builds Coffins" (live from the iTunes Festival '10)	Welch; Hayden; Ackroyd		2:47
12.	"Hospital Beds" (live from the iTunes Festival '10)	Cold War Kids		2:17

Lungs: The B-Sides
No.	Title	Writer(s)	Producer(s)	Length
1.	"Swimming"	Welch; Mackey; Stafford; James	Mackey; Flack	3:21
2.	"Heavy in Your Arms"	Welch; Epworth	Epworth	4:45
3.	"Ghosts" ("I'm Not Calling You a Liar" demo)	Welch; Summers		2:59
4.	"You've Got the Dirtee Love" (live at the Brit Awards 2010 with Dizzee Rascal)	Bellamy; Harris; Stephens; Mills; Cage	Hugall; Nicholas Denton	3:41
5.	"Dog Days Are Over" (Yeasayer Remix)	Welch; Summers	Ford; Summers^{[a]}; Yeasayer^{[c]}	4:15
6.	"Falling"	Welch; Summers	Summers; Robertson	3:32
7.	"Are You Hurting the One You Love?"	Welch; Summers; Hayden; Monger; Levi	Hugall	2:57
8.	"Addicted to Love"	Robert Palmer	Hugall	3:19
9.	"Bird Song"	Welch; Hynes	Hugall	2:54
10.	"Hospital Beds"	Cold War Kids	Epworth	2:15
11.	"Hardest of Hearts"	Welch; Tieku	Summers; Ford	3:27

10th Anniversary Edition box set bonus disc
No.	Title	Writer(s)	Producer(s)	Length
1.	"Bird Song"	Welch; Hynes	Hugall	2:55
2.	"My Boy Builds Coffins" (Acoustic)	Welch; Hayden; Ackroyd		2:50
3.	"My Best Dress" (Demo)	Welch; White		2:34
4.	"Donkey Kosh" (Demo)	Welch; Summers		2:56
5.	"Hospital Beds"	Cold War Kids	Summers	2:14
6.	"Falling"	Welch; Summers	Summers; Robertson	3:33
7.	"Ghosts" ("I'm Not Calling You a Liar" demo)	Welch; Summers		2:57
8.	"Postcards from Italy" (Demo)	Zachary Condon		3:31
9.	"Swimming"	Welch; James; Stafford; Mackey	Mackey; Flack	3:20
10.	"Are You Hurting the One You Love?"	Welch; Summers; Hayden; Tom Monger	Hugall	2:57
11.	"Oh! Darling" (Live at Abbey Road, 2009)	Lennon–McCartney		3:19

=== Notes ===
- ^{^[a]} signifies an additional producer
- ^{^[b]} signifies a vocal producer
- ^{^[c]} signifies a remixer
- ^{^[d]} signifies a mixer

== Personnel ==
Credits adapted from the liner notes of Lungs.

=== Florence and the Machine ===
- Florence Welch – vocals, additional drumming, percussion (all tracks); background vocals (tracks 7, 8)
- Christopher Lloyd Hayden – drums (tracks 1–3, 5, 10, 11, 13)
- Isabella Summers – additional drumming, percussion (all tracks); piano (tracks 1, 3, 4, 7, 8, 10, 13)
- Rob Ackroyd – guitar (tracks 1, 5, 10, 13); bass guitar (track 5)
- Tom Monger – harp (tracks 1–3, 7–13)

=== Additional musicians ===
- LaDonna Harley-Peters – background vocals (tracks 7, 8)
- Victoria Akintola – background vocals (tracks 7, 8)
- Martin Slattery – drums (track 6)
- James Ford – drums (tracks 7, 8); bass guitar (tracks 1, 7); additional piano (tracks 1, 3, 7, 8); organ (track 7)
- Charlie Hugall – additional drumming, percussion (all tracks); additional bass (track 13)
- Tim McCall – guitar (track 5); additional guitar (track 6)
- Leo Abrahams – guitar (track 6)
- Stephen Mackey – bass guitar (tracks 5, 6)
- Mete Burch Bator – bass guitar (track 10)
- Sally Herbert – string arrangements, violin
- Everton Nelson – violin
- Bruce White – viola
- Ian Burdge – cello (tracks 1, 3, 4, 7, 8, 12)
- Charlie Henry – cello (track 10)
- Duncan "Pixie" Mills – Hammond organ (track 10)

=== Technical ===
- James Ford – production (tracks 1, 3, 7, 8); mixing (track 1)
- Jimmy Robertson – recording (tracks 1, 3, 7, 8); mixing (track 1)
- Paul Epworth – production (tracks 2, 4, 9, 12); additional production (track 11)
- Mark Rankin – recording (tracks 2, 4, 9, 12); additional recording (track 11)
- Isabella Summers – additional production (tracks 1, 3, 8, 9)
- Stephen Mackey – production (tracks 5, 6); vocal production (track 10); mixing (track 5)
- Richard Flack – recording (tracks 5, 6); vocal production (track 10); mixing (track 5)
- Charlie Hugall – production (tracks 10, 13)
- Duncan "Pixie" Mills – engineering assistance (track 10)
- Ben Jackson – engineering assistance (track 10)
- Al Riley – engineering assistance (track 13)
- Eg White – production (track 11)
- Cenzo Townshend – mixing (tracks 2–4, 6–13)
- Neil Comber – mixing assistance (tracks 2–4, 6–13)
- Ben Mortimer – final edit (track 7)
- John Davis – mastering

=== Artwork ===
- Tabitha Denholm – art direction
- Florence Welch – art direction
- Tom Beard – photography
- Wade Fletcher – live photograph
- Orlando Weeks – lung illustration
- Hugh Frost – layout

== Charts ==
=== Weekly charts ===
Weekly chart performance for Lungs
Chart (2009–2022)	Peak position
Australian Albums (ARIA)	3
Austrian Albums (Ö3 Austria)	73
Belgian Albums (Ultratop Flanders)	3
Belgian Albums (Ultratop Wallonia)	51
Canadian Albums (Billboard)	20
Croatian International Albums (HDU)	17
Czech Albums (ČNS IFPI)	29
Danish Albums (Hitlisten)	37
Dutch Albums (Album Top 100)	37
European Albums (Billboard)	6
French Albums (SNEP)	117
German Albums (Offizielle Top 100)	41
Greek Albums (IFPI)	5
Irish Albums (IRMA)	2
Italian Albums (FIMI)	65
New Zealand Albums (RMNZ)	3
Norwegian Albums (VG-lista)	36
Polish Albums (ZPAV)	1
Portuguese Albums (AFP)	8
Scottish Albums (Official Charts)	2
Spanish Albums (Promusicae)	93
Swiss Albums (Schweizer Hitparade)	54
UK Albums (Official Charts)	1
US Billboard 200	14
US Heatseekers Albums (Billboard)	1
US Top Alternative Albums (Billboard)	2
US Top Rock Albums (Billboard)	3
US Indie Store Album Sales (Billboard)	5

=== Year-end charts ===
2009 year-end chart performance for Lungs
Chart (2009)	Position
European Albums (Billboard)	79
Irish Albums (IRMA)	18
UK Albums (OCC)	18

2010 year-end chart performance for Lungs
Chart (2010)	Position
Australian Albums (ARIA)	13
Belgian Albums (Ultratop Flanders)	23
European Albums (Billboard)	19
Irish Albums (IRMA)	9
New Zealand Albums (RMNZ)	19
UK Albums (OCC)	8

2011 year-end chart performance for Lungs
Chart (2011)	Position
Australian Albums (ARIA)	33
UK Albums (OCC)	57
US Billboard 200	44
US Top Alternative Albums (Billboard)	4
US Top Rock Albums (Billboard)	5

2012 year-end chart performance for Lungs
Chart (2012)	Position
Australian Albums (ARIA)	87
Belgian Mid Price Albums (Flanders)	26
UK Albums (OCC)	82
US Billboard 200	98

=== Decade-end charts ===
Decade-end chart performance for Lungs
Chart (2010–2019)	Position
Australian Albums (ARIA)	49
UK Albums (OCC)	24

== Certifications and sales ==
Certifications and sales for Lungs
Region	Certification	Certified units/sales
Australia (ARIA)	4× Platinum	280,000^{‡}
Belgium (BRMA)	Gold	15,000^{*}
Brazil (Pro-Música Brasil) Between Two Lungs	Platinum	40,000^{‡}
Brazil (Pro-Música Brasil) Deluxe	Gold	30,000^{‡}
Brazil (Pro-Música Brasil) Internacional Version	Gold	30,000^{‡}
Brazil (Pro-Música Brasil) 10th Anniversary Edition	Gold	20,000^{‡}
Canada (Music Canada)	Gold	40,000^{^}
Denmark (IFPI Danmark)	Platinum	20,000^{‡}
Germany (BVMI)	Platinum	200,000^{‡}
Ireland (IRMA)	4× Platinum	60,000^{^}
Italy (FIMI)	Platinum	50,000^{‡}
New Zealand (RMNZ)	4× Platinum	60,000^{‡}
Poland (ZPAV)	Platinum	20,000^{*}
Portugal (AFP)	Platinum	20,000^{^}
United Kingdom (BPI)	6× Platinum	1,813,557
United States (RIAA)	2× Platinum	1,142,000
Summaries
Europe (IFPI)	2× Platinum	2,000,000^{*}
Worldwide	—	3,000,000
^{*} Sales figures based on certification alone.^{^} Shipments figures based on certification alone.^{‡} Sales+streaming figures based on certification alone.

Certifications for Between Two Lungs
Region	Certification	Certified units/sales
Poland (ZPAV)	Gold	10,000^{*}
^{*} Sales figures based on certification alone.

== Release history ==
Region	Date	Edition	Label	Ref.
Netherlands	3 July 2009	Standard	Universal	
Ireland	3 July 2009	Standard	Island	
United Kingdom	6 July 2009	Standard; deluxe	Island	
Norway	6 July 2009	Standard	Universal	
France	9 July 2009	Standard	Universal	
Germany	10 July 2009	Standard; deluxe	Universal	
Australia	17 July 2009	Standard	Universal	
Poland	24 July 2009	Standard	Universal	
Japan	5 August 2009	Standard	Universal	
Canada	11 August 2009	Standard	Universal	
Italy	25 September 2009	Standard	Universal	
United States	20 October 2009	Standard	Universal Republic	
United Kingdom	23 November 2009	Limited edition box set	Island	
Australia	21 May 2010	Deluxe	Universal	
Netherlands	12 November 2010	Between Two Lungs	Universal	
Ireland	12 November 2010	Between Two Lungs	Island	
United Kingdom	15 November 2010	Between Two Lungs	Island	
Canada	15 November 2010	Between Two Lungs	Universal	
Norway	15 November 2010	Between Two Lungs	Universal	
Germany	16 November 2010	Between Two Lungs	Universal	
France	18 November 2010	Between Two Lungs	Universal	
Australia	19 November 2010	Between Two Lungs	Universal	
Poland	19 November 2010	Between Two Lungs	Universal	
United States	27 February 2011	Lungs: The B-Sides (digital download)	Universal Republic	
United States	26 April 2011	Deluxe	Universal Republic	
Worldwide	16 August 2019	10th Anniversary (streaming)	Universal Republic	
Worldwide	4 October 2019	10th Anniversary (box set)	Universal Republic	
