= I Will Be =

I Will Be may refer to:

- "I Will Be" (song), 2009 song by Leona Lewis
- I Will Be (album), 2010 album by Dum Dum Girls
- "I Will Be", a song by Florence and the Machine from Songs from Final Fantasy XV
