= Rabbit Heart (Raise It Up) =

Song by Florence and the Machine

Single by Florence and the Machine

from the album Lungs
- B-side: "Are You Hurting the One You Love?"
- Released: 21 June 2009
- Genre: Baroque pop; indie rock; folk rock
- Length: 3:52
- Label: Island; Moshi Moshi
- Songwriters: Florence Welch; Paul Epworth; Elizabeth Bougatsos; Brian DeGraw; Joshua Deutsch; Timothy DeWit
- Producer: Paul Epworth

Florence and the Machine singles chronology
"Dog Days Are Over" (2008)	"Rabbit Heart (Raise It Up)" (2009)	"Drumming Song" (2009)

Lungs track listing
- 1. "Dog Days Are Over"; 2. "Rabbit Heart (Raise It Up)"; 3. "I'm Not Calling You a Liar"; 4. "Howl"; 5. "Kiss with a Fist"; 6. "Girl with One Eye"; 7. "Drumming Song"; 8. "Between Two Lungs"; 9. "Cosmic Love"; 10. "My Boy Builds Coffins"; 11. "Hurricane Drunk"; 12. "Blinding"; 13. "You've Got the Love"

Music video
- "Rabbit Heart (Raise It Up)" on YouTube

"Rabbit Heart (Raise It Up)" is a song by English indie rock band Florence and the Machine from their debut studio album Lungs (2009). It was released as the album's third single on June 21, 2009, by Island and Moshi Moshi Records. The song was written by Florence Welch and Paul Epworth, produced by Epworth and mixed by Cenzo Townshend. The song contains elements of "House Jam" by Gang Gang Dance. It has been remixed by numerous artists, including Jamie T, whose remix appears on the single's CD and digital releases.

"Rabbit Heart (Raise It Up)" peaked at number 12 on the UK Singles Chart, becoming the band's third most successful single to date, behind "Spectrum", which peaked at number one, and "You've Got the Love", which has reached number five.

== Background ==
"Rabbit Heart (Raise It Up)" features Florence Welch's voice overdubbed with many harmonies in order to sound like a massed choir of one. She confessed to The Independent: "The guy who mixed it nearly had a nervous breakdown."

The song was co-written by Welch together with Paul Epworth who also produced the song which was recorded by Mark Rankin. The track features Tom 'Moth' Monger on harp and Robert Ackroyd on guitar. During the verses, the song features some of the melody and lyrics (e.g. "How quickly the glamour fades") from Gang Gang Dance's song "House Jam".

Florence described her inspiration behind the song:

I'd written all these dark songs, and the label suggested we should have something that was a bit more upbeat. In the process of trying to do that, I realised maybe I was sacrificing something. So I had a really upbeat piano and drums, but the lyrics that came out were 'This is the gift/It comes with a price/ Who is the lamb/And who is the knife?' The rabbit heart is a reference to fear. I'm so afraid of what's about to happen. Of being in the spotlight.

As part of the single's promotion, the band performed the song on The Jonathan Ross Show as well as in BBC Radio 1's Live Lounge. The single was also performed at numerous festivals across the United Kingdom throughout 2009, including Glastonbury, Electric Picnic, Brighton, T in the Park, Bestival and Reading, among others.

The song was also featured as BBC Radio 1's Zane Lowe's "Single of the Week".

== Critical reception ==
"Rabbit Heart (Raise It Up)" received critical acclaim from music critics. Pitchfork Media wrote that Welch "add[s] some welcomed ambiguity to a Paul Epworth production that stunningly internalizes every pseudo-psych/freakishly-folk trend that's passed through these parts over the last few years. 'The looking glass so shiny and new/ How quickly the glamor fades,' wisely observes Welch. A gold record in every way."

== Chart performance ==
On 4 July 2009, "Rabbit Heart (Raise It Up)" debuted at number twelve on the UK Singles Chart. It spent a total of seven weeks in the top twenty, and seventeen in the official top seventy-five, a significantly longer charting period than any of the band's previous three singles. "Rabbit Heart (Raise It Up)" debuted at number forty-two on the Irish Singles Chart on 27 June 2009. The song then went on to peak at number forty-one, spending a total of eight weeks on the chart.

As of July 2018 in United Kingdom the track has shifted 308,000 combined sales and streams.

== Music video ==
Welch in the music video for "Rabbit Heart (Raise It Up)"

The music video for "Rabbit Heart (Raise It Up)" was directed by Tom Beard and Queens of Noize's Tabitha Denholm. It was shot on location at Painshill Park in Cobham, Surrey on May 6, 2009 Welch told NME that the video shoot had "a twisted mid summer night's dream feel to it." The video premiered on YouTube on May 14, 2009.

== Cover versions ==
English girl group the Sugababes performed the song twice, first in BBC Radio 1's Live Lounge alongside their single "About a Girl" in November 2009 and again at Camden Crawl in 2010.

== Track listings ==
- UK CD single
1. "Rabbit Heart (Raise It Up)" (album version) – 3:54
2. "Rabbit Heart (Raise It Up)" (Jamie T's Lionheart remix) – 4:49
3. "Rabbit Heart (Raise It Up)" (Leo Zero remix) – 8:09
- Digital EP
1. "Rabbit Heart (Raise It Up)" – 3:52
2. "Are You Hurting the One You Love?" – 2:58
3. "Rabbit Heart (Raise It Up)" (Jamie T & Ben Bones Lionheart mix) – 4:50
4. "Rabbit Heart (Raise It Up)" (Leo Zero remix) – 8:05
5. "Rabbit Heart (Raise It Up)" (Switch mix) – 4:44
- UK 7-inch single

A. "Rabbit Heart (Raise It Up)" – 3:52
B. "Are You Hurting the One You Love?" – 2:58

== Charts ==
=== Weekly charts ===
Chart (2009–2010)	Peak position
Australia (ARIA)	93
Belgium (Ultratop 50 Flanders)	50
Ireland (IRMA)	41
Scottish Singles Sales (Official Charts)	10
UK Singles (Official Charts)	12

=== Year-end charts ===
Chart (2009)	Position
UK Singles (OCC)	102

== Certifications ==
Region	Certification	Certified units/sales
United Kingdom (BPI)	Gold	400,000^{‡}
^{‡} Sales+streaming figures based on certification alone.
