= Drumming Song =

Single by Florence and the Machine

from the album Lungs
- B-side: "Falling" (Demo Version)
- Released: 13 September 2009
- Genre: Indie rock; art rock
- Length: 3:43
- Label: Universal Island
- Songwriters: Florence Welch; James Ford; Crispin Hunt
- Producer: James Ford

Florence and the Machine singles chronology
"Rabbit Heart (Raise It Up)" (2009)	"Drumming Song" (2009)	"You've Got the Love" (2009)

Lungs track listing
- 1. "Dog Days Are Over"; 2. "Rabbit Heart (Raise It Up)"; 3. "I'm Not Calling You a Liar"; 4. "Howl"; 5. "Kiss with a Fist"; 6. "Girl with One Eye"; 7. "Drumming Song"; 8. "Between Two Lungs"; 9. "Cosmic Love"; 10. "My Boy Builds Coffins"; 11. "Hurricane Drunk"; 12. "Blinding"; 13. "You've Got the Love"

Music video
- "Drumming Song" on YouTube

"Drumming Song" is a song by the English indie rock band Florence and the Machine. The song was released on Island Records on 13 September 2009 in the UK as the fourth single from the band's first album Lungs. The song was the band's second consecutive single to be A-listed on BBC Radio 1. It was the band's fourth single to enter the top 75 on the UK Singles Chart, peaking at #54 during its week of physical release. The B-side is a demo version of "Falling", a track which appears only on the deluxe edition of Lungs. Though not as commercially successful as their other singles, "Drumming Song" is a favourite amongst fans at Florence and the Machine live performances.

The single was nominated for "Best Music Video" (alongside Lady Gaga and Mika) at the Q Awards, which took place on 25 October 2009.

== Background ==
"Drumming Song" has an instrumental collaboration of drums, organ, piano, bass, violin, viola, cello and harp. James Ford, the track's producer, is credited for the bass, drums, organ and piano contributions. Ford co-wrote the song with Crispin Hunt and the song has backing vocals by Ladonna Hartley-Peters and Victoria Alkinlola.

Welch elaborated on the concept of the song:

This is about when there's that electricity between you, and a boy, and it's completely unspoken. When they're standing in front of you and you can't breathe, can't think, can't do anything properly. I'm really geeky – if I like someone, I just become incapable. I remember with my first boyfriend, walking past the window of a pub, seeing he was in there and literally throwing myself on the ground and crawling on the floor because I was so scared! I feel things quite intensely, which is probably why the music is quite intense. If I really like someone, I like someone; if I'm sad, I'm sad. I was listening to a lot of hip hop and I wanted to make something that had that kind of beat to it. To me it's the most forward-thinking music around. No one else is moving forward at such pace! Again, it's really Gothic imagery – fairy tales and Edgar Allan Poe [sic] stories. I'd read a lot of Gothic horror when I was a kid.

The imagery of ears ringing around an object of immense attraction in fact predates Gothic literature by a few millennia. In Fragment 31 the ancient Greek poet Sappho describes such a phenomenon; Anne Carson's 2002 translation of Sappho's poem prefigures "Drumming Song" directly by describing how "drumming/fills the ears".

As part of the single's promotion, the band performed the song on Jools Holland with their previous single "Rabbit Heart (Raise It Up)". The single was also performed at numerous festivals around the UK during 2009, including Glastonbury, Brighton, T in the Park, Bestival, Reading and Electric Picnic in the Republic of Ireland.

A music video for the song was shot in the interior of Christ Church, Spitalfields, with Florence Welch and dancers. The English Baroque church, designed by Nicholas Hawksmoor, interpreted the overall shapes of Gothic architecture with the language of classical architecture.

The song also appears on the soundtrack of 2010 FIFA World Cup South Africa, the video game published by EA Sports.

== Critical reception ==
"Drumming Song" received positive feedback from critics. David Balls from Digital Spy awarded the song 4 stars out of a possible 5, he stated: "A darker and more brooding offering than 'Rabbit Heart', it's a case of drum as metaphor for love as Welch describes an unadulterated and impassioned love affair. 'Louder than sirens, louder than bells, sweeter than heaven and hotter than hell,' she wails with more enough power and passion to justify all the critical acclaim."

NME named the song 48th best track of 2009, saying, "In 'Drumming Song', she [Welch] created possibly one of the most intensely passionate and physically aching love songs we've ever heard."

== Formats and track listings ==
UK CD single

1. "Drumming Song" – 3:45
2. "Falling" (demo) – 3:48
3. "Dog Days Are Over" (acoustic) – 3:58

UK 7" vinyl single

1. "Drumming Song" – 3:45
2. "My Boy Builds Coffins" (acoustic)

Digital download

1. "Drumming Song" – 3:43
2. "Drumming Song" (acoustic) – 3:51
3. "Drumming Song" (Boy 8-Bit Remix) – 6:31
4. "Drumming Song" (Jack Beats Remix) – 5:04
5. "Rabbit Heart (Raise It Up)" (acoustic) – 3:52

== Charts ==
Chart performance for "Drumming Song"
Chart (2009)	Peak position
Scotland (OCC)	14
UK Singles (OCC)	54
