= Queens of Noize =

UK disc jockey duo

- Born: Mairead Nash (born 1982); Tabitha Denholm (born 1975)
- Occupations: Radio DJs, television presenters
- Years active: 2002–2008
- Television: MTV2

Queens of Noize were a DJ duo based in London, consisting of Mairead Nash and Tabitha Denholm. During their time as a duo, they presented for MTV2 and BBC Radio 6 Music and performed at a number of international festivals.

== Career ==
Their career began in 2002 with their club night at Club 333 in Shoreditch, which subsequently moved to the Camden Barfly. They performed internationally at clubs and festivals, including the Carling Weekend, Roskilde Festival and Festival Internacional de Benicàssim, and presented their own show on MTV2. They also released a single, "Indie Boys (Don't Deserve It)", to little critical or commercial success.

They started presenting a radio show in September 2006 on BBC 6 Music, called Queens of Noize Sonic Safari. The show was first broadcast from 12 midnight to 2 am Saturday into Sunday, then from 7 April 2007 it moved to a Saturday afternoon time slot of 4 pm–6 pm until 31 May 2008 when the slot was taken over by Lauren Laverne. The pair hosted a two-hour show on BBC 6 Music from 12 midnight to 2 am Friday into Saturday from June 2008 until April 2009. As well as their own show, they also presented the Listener 6 Mix on Sunday nights from 8 pm to 10 pm from November 2007 until September 2008, then took over the 6 Mix for a period.

Since leaving BBC radio, Denholm has been working as a video director, while Nash runs her own record label, Luv.
