= Cosmic Love =

2010 single by Florence + the Machine

Single by Florence and the Machine

from the album Lungs
- Released: 5 July 2010
- Recorded: 2009
- Length: 4:15
- Label: Island; Moshi Moshi; IAMSOUND
- Songwriters: Florence Welch; Isabella Summers
- Producer: Paul Epworth

Florence and the Machine singles chronology
"Dog Days Are Over" (2010)	"Cosmic Love" (2010)	"Heavy in Your Arms" (2010)

Music video
- "Cosmic Love" on YouTube

"Cosmic Love" is a song by English indie rock band Florence and the Machine from their debut studio album Lungs (2009). The song was written by the band's lead singer Florence Welch and keyboardist Isabella Summers, and produced by Paul Epworth, with additional production from Summers.

"Cosmic Love" was released as the sixth (seventh, counting the re-release of "Dog Days Are Over") and final single from Lungs on 5 July 2010. The song was critically acclaimed, with many critics calling it the best song on the album, and was certified Platinum by the Recording Industry Association of America.

The song was used in a scene on British soap-opera Coronation Street in May 2018, in which the character Aidan Connor (Shayne Ward) takes his own life.

== Background and writing ==
Lead singer Florence Welch elaborated on the writing of the song:

'Cosmic Love' was a joke title, but it stuck. The most hungover I’ve ever been when writing a song. I went to [Isabella Summers's] studio after having been to a party, and I was lying on the floor wanting to vomit. We were working really hard on a song and just trying to make this shit piano part work, and all of a sudden I hit on one note, and I’d got it. We wrote the whole song in ten minutes.

Welch told The Sunday Times that it's a song about how being in love means "you give yourself up to the dark, to being blind".

== Critical reception ==
"Cosmic Love" has been widely praised by music critics, with many critics calling it the best song on the album. Pitchfork says the song is "audaciously huge" and one of the album's "finest" tracks, alongside "Blinding".

== Chart performance ==
"Cosmic Love" debuted on the UK Singles Chart at number 162 on 26 June 2010 before climbing to number 116 the following week. On 11 July 2010, following the physical release of the single, it rocketed into the Top 100 at number 51, giving Florence her seventh Top 100 hit from the album Lungs. "Cosmic Love" is Florence's second least successful single in the UK charts behind "Drumming Song", along with "Kiss with a Fist", which also peaked at number 51. Conversely, the song is Florence and the Machine's highest-charting song in Ireland, as due to high digital sales it charted at number 3 there, almost a year before its physical release after it was featured in an advert for The O_{2} in Dublin.

== Music video and use in other media ==
A promotional music video was shot on 24 March 2010. Welch's manager Mairead Nash described it as "amazing." The video was debuted on the band's official website on 11 May 2010.

=== Synopsis ===
The video begins with a shot of a lightbulb flashing. Lead singer Florence Welch is then seen to walk through some trees with autumn leaves, and a light falls into her eye, making her scream. The video then moves on to show Welch lying on the floor in a black outfit, in a mirrored room filled with different coloured lights around her. She then stands up and dances in the room. The video then moves back to Florence walking through the autumn leaves, with blue, green and purple lighting shining on her, and she appears to be lost as she is surveying her surroundings. The scene of Welch in the room of lights then changes to darker lighting, and her outfit changes into a white dress with lights. Later in the song, during this scene, leaves are seen to surround her as she is dancing. The video ends with Florence taking the light from inside her chest, and releasing it into the air, and it floats into the lightbulb which started the video.

=== In other media ===
In 2013, American rapper Sikai and XV sampled "Cosmic Love" for the song "Falling Star". The song was also sampled in the same year by American rapper Marcus Orelias for the song "Rebel of the Underground" and in 2014 by rapper, MZ on the song "Lune De Fiel" featuring french rapper Marlo.

== Track listing ==
UK 7-inch vinyl

1. "Cosmic Love"
2. "Cosmic Love" (Isa Machine, Russ Fawcus and Lexxx Remix)

== Charts ==
Chart (2009–2010)	Peak position
Belgium (Ultratip Bubbling Under Flanders)	5
Ireland (IRMA)	3
Scottish Singles Sales (Official Charts)	60
UK Singles (Official Charts)	51

== Certifications ==
Region	Certification	Certified units/sales
Australia (ARIA)	Platinum	70,000^{‡}
New Zealand (RMNZ)	Gold	15,000^{‡}
United Kingdom (BPI)	Gold	400,000^{‡}
United States (RIAA)	Platinum	1,000,000^{‡}
^{‡} Sales+streaming figures based on certification alone.
