= Dog Days Are Over =

2008 single by Florence and the Machine

Single by Florence + the Machine

from the album Lungs
- B-side: "You've Got the Love"
- Released: 1 December 2008
- Genre: Indie pop; alternative rock; folk rock; soul
- Length: 4:13 (album version); 3:41 (radio edit)
- Label: Universal Island; Moshi Moshi; IAMSOUND
- Songwriters: Florence Welch; Isabella Summers
- Producer: James Ford

Florence + the Machine singles chronology
"Kiss with a Fist" (2008)	"Dog Days Are Over" (2008)	"Rabbit Heart (Raise It Up)" (2009)

Music video
- "Dog Days Are Over" on YouTube

2010 re-issue cover

Music video
- "Dog Days Are Over" (2010 version) on YouTube

"Dog Days Are Over" is a song by English indie rock band Florence and the Machine from their debut album Lungs (2009). It was originally scheduled for release on 24 November 2008 through Moshi Moshi Records in the UK as the album's second single, but was later pushed back for release on 1 December 2008. A day later on 2 December 2008 the single was released in download and seven-inch vinyl format through IAMSOUND Records in the US. The B-side to the single is a cover of "You Got the Love" by The Source featuring Candi Staton which later was confirmed as a track on their debut album and the band's fifth single. The single reached the top 30 in Canada, Ireland, the United Kingdom, and the United States.

A demo version of "Dog Days Are Over" is featured on disc two of the deluxe edition of Lungs. A six-minute, forty-second-long Optimo remix of "Dog Days Are Over" has also been made available. An acoustic version of the song was performed live on BBC Radio 1's Big Weekend. The track has been performed at a great number of high-profile festivals through 2008 and 2009, including the Reading and Leeds festivals. The band also performed the song on the Mercury Prize 2009 awards show and BBC Introducing. In 2023, the song appeared in the finale of Guardians of the Galaxy Vol. 3 and re-entered some charts almost 15 years after its release.

== Background and recording ==
The song was inspired by a giant text instalment titled "Dog Days Are Over" by artist Ugo Rondinone, which lead singer Florence Welch used to see every day, riding her bike over Waterloo Bridge.The expression "Dog Days" refers to difficult times. "Dog Days Are Over" was recorded with no instruments in a studio the "size of a loo" in the Crystal Palace area of London. The song was produced and mixed by James Ford of Simian Mobile Disco and The Last Shadow Puppets, who is also famous for producing for the likes of Bloc Party and the Arctic Monkeys. Ford is credited as playing piano and guitar on the record. The drum sounds were created by banging on the studio walls.

Welch co-wrote the song with Isabella Summers, who is also credited as the song's co-producer, and played piano on the record. Welch and Summers also teamed up for the percussion on the track, together with Charlie Hugall. "Dog Days Are Over" also features musicians Tom "Moth" Monger (harp), Bruce White (viola), Everton Nelson (violin), Christopher Lloyd Hayden (drums) and Rob Ackroyd (guitar). Jimmy Robertson, extensively involved in the recording of the band's debut record Lungs, recorded and mixed "Dog Days" as well.

== 2010 re-release ==
The song was re-released into the UK market on 11 April 2010, accompanied with a new video.

== Critical reception ==
"Dog Days Are Over" has been widely praised by music critics, with Welch's vocals being lauded. John Murphy of MusicOMH commented that "'Dog Days Are Over' only seems likely to add to her already burgeoning reputation. While not as immediately catchy as "Kiss with a Fist," it's an urgent, pounding, almost bluesy anthem which shows off Florence's voice to its very best advantage". The track's B-side, a cover of The Source's "You Got the Love", was also praised.

Contactmusic.com rated the song 9 out of 10. The website remarked that "It's brilliant. It's a masterful yet primal tour-de-force of folk/pop/rock that reveals a beguiling talent that should surely be regarded as one of the finds of the musical year. "Dog Days Are Over" succeeds in capturing a powerfully 'live' studio sound that sinks, swells and explodes in a series of unconventional verse/choruses that, accentuated by Welch's snarling". In October 2011, NME placed it at number 33 on its list "150 Best Tracks of the Past 15 Years".

== Chart performance ==
On 6 December 2008, "Dog Days Are Over" debuted at number 89 on the UK Singles Chart. The following week it dropped one place to number 90 before dropping out of the top 100. It then re-entered the chart a month later on 17 January 2009 at number 93 before dropping out of the chart again. Approximately four months later the single made another re-entry on 23 May 2009, this time at number 91.

Following performances on Top of the Pops, Jools Holland and uses in television advertisement for Slumdog Millionaire and Eat, Pray, Love, "Dog Days Are Over" began to receive increasing amounts of digital downloads, despite not having been re-released. On 10 January 2010, "Dog Days Are Over" re-entered the UK Singles Chart at number 23, marking its highest peak to date. However, the following week, on 17 January 2010, the single fell one place to number 24. Following the single's official re-release in March 2010, it re-entered the UK Singles Chart at number 34 on 4 April 2010. The following week, the single rose to number 24 before dropping again. Following the release of Guardians of the Galaxy Vol. 3 in May 2023, which featured the song, it reentered the chart and reached a new peak of number 21.

On 15 January 2010, "Dog Days Are Over" entered the Irish Singles Chart for the first time, reaching a peak of number 35. This was the third Top 40 hit for Florence in Ireland. Following its re-release in March 2010, the single once again entered the Irish Singles Chart, this time climbing to number 24 and a week later to number 17. The following week, the single rose to number 15, and the week after, number 13. On 15 April 2010, the single entered the Top 10 at its peak position, number 6, making "Dog Days Are Over" Florence's fourth highest-charting single in Ireland, after "Cosmic Love" (number 3), "Shake It Out" (number 2), and "Spectrum (Say My Name)" (number 1).

On the week ending 25 September 2010, "Dog Days Are Over" debuted at number 93 on the Billboard Hot 100. Following the performance of "Dog Days Are Over" on the 2010 MTV Video Music Awards, the track sold 96,000 digital downloads which signified a 257% increase over the previous week and leaped to number 21 giving Florence her first top 30 hit on the Billboard Hot 100. As of June 2016, the song has sold over 3,151,000 downloads in the United States alone.

== Music videos ==
The first video, filmed in Sydenham Woods, was uploaded onto YouTube on 6 November 2008. "I just made it on a whim. We went down to the woods and we only had one camera. I got my dad to put a clown costume on and my friend's nephew to dress up as the baby clown while we decorated the woods. Dog walkers gave us the weirdest looks. It was really fun." The video starts with Florence lying in a forest, when a person (Isabella Summers) in a white dress comes over and blindfolds her, and leads her to a clearing, filled with eerie-looking carnival/clown dressed people. Florence stands blindfolded for a few seconds, then takes the blindfold off and runs from the people. She eventually trips, and lies there as the carnival/clown people dress her like them. She then goes and dances with them, and the video ends with her walking away with 2 of the other people. The video featured acclaimed performance artist Theo Adams.

A new video was directed by Georgie Greville and Geremy Jasper and edited by Paul Snyder. It was shot by cinematographer Adam Frisch. It shows Florence dancing in a white-washed room wearing many different costumes and gradually being joined by go-go dancers, drummers wearing tribal outfits, harpists, marching band bass drummers and a gospel choir wearing white and purple. At the climax of the song Florence runs by all the people and as she does, they burst into ash in a flash of brightly coloured light. The video ends with Florence once again standing alone in the room. Throughout the video she wears full-body white make-up with intricate clothing and vivid red eye-liner and blusher. The video features actor Greg Draven in one of his first roles. 10 years later in 2020 Greg would work with Florence again on acclaimed The Third Day: Autumn.

On 3 August 2010 the video was nominated for four MTV Video Music Awards in the categories Video of the Year, Best Rock Video, Best Art Direction and Best Cinematography, and won for Best Art Direction on 12 September 2010.

== Live performances ==
"Dog Days Are Over" was performed on every date of the Lungs Tour 2009 and has become a fan favourite. Florence often asks the crowd to do a particular action during the end of the song. During the song's original promotion, the band played the song at BBC Introducing Sessions, along with "My Boy Builds Coffins", "Kiss with a Fist" and "I'm Not Calling You a Liar".

Florence and the Machine performed the song at the Nobel Peace Prize Concert in December 2010. The song has been performed live several times since the confirmation of the song being re-released. The song was first performed on Alan Carr: Chatty Man on 18 March 2010. The band also performed the song on GMTV on the single's release date, 22 March 2010.

The band performed the song live at the 2010 MTV Video Music Awards. It was later performed on Saturday Night Live on 20 November 2010, The Late Show with David Letterman on 16 December 2010, and on The Colbert Report on 21 June 2011.

== Cover versions and samples ==
The cast of Glee performed the song in the episode "Special Education" on 30 November 2010, with Jenna Ushkowitz (as Tina Cohen-Chang) and Amber Riley (as Mercedes Jones) singing the lead. The cast version was also released as a digital single, and charted on the Billboard Hot 100 at number 22, one space below a bounding return of the original to its post-VMA peak. It was performed on their 2011 Tour and was featured in the film and live recording soundtrack. In the thirteenth season of American Idol, it was performed by Jena Irene. It was covered by Chinese artist Shang Wenjie in the Chinese TV show "I am a Singer." A Finalist of Indonesian Idol (season 8) Yuka Tamada sang it for the first week of the "spectacular" shows. She received a great feedback and reached the Top 3. In 2011, it also featured on the first season of The Voice (United States), with Vicci Martinez singing the version along with a stage full of drummers. Vicci advanced to the finals on this performance but ultimately lost to Javier Colon in the final.

California-based hardcore punk band Stick To Your Guns also covered this song as a part of a Sumerian Records tribute compilation. Australian Dan Sultan covered the song on his 2019 album Aviary Takes. Postmodern Jukebox, a YouTube channel famous for covering pop music in vintage styles, also uploaded a cover sung by Hannah Gill in October 2019.

Canadian rapper Drake interpolated the song's chorus in his 2023 single "Rich Baby Daddy", which features American musicians Sexyy Red and SZA.

The song was featured at the end of the 2023 Marvel Studios film Guardians of the Galaxy Vol. 3 directed by James Gunn and experienced a resurgence, having its biggest streaming day ever on Spotify 15 years after being released.

== Track listing and formats ==
Original 7-inch vinyl/CD single promo

1. "Dog Days Are Over" – 4:10
2. "You've Got the Love" – 2:48

2010 re-release 7-inch vinyl

1. "Dog Days Are Over" – 4:10
2. "Dog Days Are Over" (Optimo Espacio Remix) – 6:43

2010 digital download bundle

1. "Dog Days Are Over" – 4:10
2. "Dog Days Are Over" (Breakage Remix) – 4:48
3. "Dog Days Are Over" (Steve Pitron & Max Sanna Remix) – 6:43
4. "Dog Days Are Over" (Optimo Espacio Remix) – 6:43
5. "You've Got the Love" (strings version, live from the Union Chapel)

== Charts ==
=== Weekly charts ===
Weekly chart performance
Chart (2008–2012)	Peak position
Australia (ARIA)	47
Belgium (Ultratop 50 Flanders)	21
Belgium (Ultratip Bubbling Under Wallonia)	19
Canada Hot 100 (Billboard)	19
Ireland (IRMA)	6
Italy (FIMI)	83
New Zealand (Recorded Music NZ)	27
Scottish Singles Sales (Official Charts)	16
UK Singles (Official Charts)	23
US Billboard Hot 100	21
US Adult Pop Airplay (Billboard)	11
US Dance Club Songs (Billboard)	4
US Hot Rock & Alternative Songs (Billboard)	9
US Rock & Alternative Airplay (Billboard)	9

2023–2026 weekly chart performance for "Dog Days Are Over"
Chart (2023–2026)	Peak position
Global 200 (Billboard)	119
Portugal (AFP)	149
UK Singles (Official Charts)	21
US Hot Rock & Alternative Songs (Billboard)	8

=== Year-end charts ===
Year-end chart performance
Chart (2009)	Position
UK Singles (OCC)	147
Chart (2010)	Position
UK Singles (OCC)	93
Chart (2011)	Position
US Adult Top 40 (Billboard)	47
US Hot Rock Songs (Billboard)	15
US Radio Songs (Billboard)	75
Chart (2023)	Position
UK Singles (OCC)	70
Chart (2024)	Position
UK Singles (OCC)	99
Chart (2025)	Position
UK Singles (OCC)	97

=== All-time charts ===
Chart (1995–2021)	Position
US Adult Alternative Songs (Billboard)	75

== Certifications ==
Certifications for "Dog Days Are Over"
Region	Certification	Certified units/sales
Australia (ARIA)	7× Platinum	490,000^{‡}
Brazil (Pro-Música Brasil)	Diamond	250,000^{‡}
Denmark (IFPI Danmark)	Gold	45,000^{‡}
Germany (BVMI)	Gold	150,000^{‡}
Italy (FIMI)	Platinum	50,000^{‡}
New Zealand (RMNZ)	8× Platinum	240,000^{‡}
Portugal (AFP)	3× Platinum	75,000^{‡}
Spain (Promusicae)	Platinum	60,000^{‡}
United Kingdom (BPI)	6× Platinum	3,600,000^{‡}
United States (RIAA)	6× Platinum	6,000,000^{‡} / 3,151,000
Streaming
Greece (IFPI Greece)	Gold	1,000,000^{†}
^{‡} Sales+streaming figures based on certification alone.^{†} Streaming-only figures based on certification alone.

== Release history ==
Release dates and formats for "Dog Days Are Over"
Region	Date	Format	Label(s)	Ref.
United States	October 19, 2010	Mainstream airplay	Universal Republic	
