= Kiss with a Fist =

Single by Florence and the Machine

from the album Lungs
- B-side: "Hospital Beds"
- Released: 9 June 2008
- Recorded: 17 November 2007
- Genre: Garage rock; punk blues; new wave; pop punk
- Length: 2:04
- Label: Universal Island; Moshi Moshi; Iamsound
- Songwriters: Florence Welch; Matt Alchin
- Producer: Stephen Mackey

Florence and the Machine singles chronology
"Kiss with a Fist" (2008)	"Dog Days Are Over" (2008)

Music video
- "Kiss with a Fist" on YouTube

"Kiss with a Fist" is the debut single by indie rock band Florence and the Machine, taken from their debut studio album Lungs (2009). The single was released through Moshi Moshi Records on 9 June 2008 in the UK and was then released four months later on 6 October 2008 through IAMSOUND Records in the US. The B-side to "Kiss with a Fist" is a cover version of the Cold War Kids song "Hospital Beds".

It has been featured on the original motion picture soundtrack to 2009 black comedy film Jennifer's Body, as well as the 2008 film Wild Child, NBC comedy Community (Season 1, Episode 12 - "Comparative Religion"), Cougar Town (Season 1, Episode 3 - "Don't Do Me Like That"), Saving Grace, United States of Tara and The Good Doctor. The song was also used to advertise the launch of the Channel 4 music channel.

== Background ==
"Kiss with a Fist" first appeared with the same lyrics under the name "Happy Slap" on Ashok's (Florence Welch's previous band) first (and only) album Plans. "Kiss with a Fist" was originally released as a non-album single and was later finalised as track number five on Lungs. It is significantly the shortest track on the album and was co-written by Florence Welch herself along with Isabella Summers (who co-wrote the majority of the songs on the album with Welch) and Matt Allchin. The song is in an indie garage-rock style and features Christopher Lloyd Haiden on drums, Robert Ackroyd on bass guitar and Tim McCall on guitar. The track was both recorded and mixed by Richard Flack with producer, former Pulp bassist Steve Mackey (renowned for his work with M.I.A.) credited as a co-mixer as well.

Originally, a great deal of confusion surrounded the song's meaning. With lyrics such as "broke your jaw once before", "split your blood upon the floor", "you smashed a plate over my head", "you gave a kick" and "I gave a slap" - the song was thought by many to be based on domestic violence, which Welch denies.

Welch explained the song's meaning on her MySpace:

"Kiss with a Fist" is NOT a song about domestic violence.

It is about two people pushing each other to psychological extremes because they are fighting but they still love each other. The song is not about one person being attacked, or any actual physical violence, there are no victims in this song. Sometimes the love two people have for each other is a destructive force. But they can't have it any other way, because it's what holds them together, they enjoy the drama and pushing each other's buttons. The only way to express these extreme emotions is with extreme imagery, all of which is fantasism and nothing in the song is based on reality.

Leona Lewis's "Bleeding Love" isn't actually about her bleeding and this song isn't actually about punching someone in the mouth."

The single was performed on BBC Introducing and at Academy 1 as part of the release's promotion. The song is also a regular feature of the band's performance setlist, being performed at numerous festivals in and around the UK, including Glastonbury, Brighton, the NME Awards tour, the Ben & Jerry festival and the Electric Picnic among others.

Welch further elaborated on her inspiration behind the song:

I was 16 or 17 when I wrote this. I'd just fallen in love for the first time, and I'd also started hanging out with an older group of people, watching how their relationships worked. There was this one couple who were so cool, but so visceral and so intense. The guy never hit the girl, but I saw her lamp him a couple of times, and she'd always give as good as she got. But it wasn't really physical violence, it was more about the fact that their animal passion for each other was the thing that was attractive for them. It was how joyful destruction can be, and how alluring it is to be in a relationship so fiery. There was never a dull moment when they were around. I don't know how they do it! I'm a conflict avoider. I think I write about such intense things because I'm actually really bad at expressing anger.

== Critical reception ==
MusicOMH questioned the song by saying "Those lyrics are likely to prove pretty contentious – is Welch condoning domestic violence with lines like "a kiss with a fist is better than none"? Or is it a character sketch of a woman cowed into submission by her violent lover?" but finished that paragraph by saying "Whatever the meaning, this is an exhilarating debut single." Leedsmusicscene.net gave the song three stars out of five, saying that "The single sees a punchy garage-blues racket (albeit acoustic led) accompaniment to Florence, who sticks to the fore throughout by belting out a soulful yet feisty Joplin-esque growl." They then went on to say about the B-side, "Florence belts out another powerful vocal on Cold War Kids cover 'Hospital Beds', this time over the top of a more subdued, but no less apt, acoustic guitar line." Boomkat.com reviewed the song:"You can't help but make links between this and The Crystals' "He Hit Me (It Felt Like a Kiss)". That said the song itself sounds a bit more like The White Stripes' "We're Going to Be Friends", which is all fine and dandy. Florence sounds reasonably rooted in DIY roughness and she puts plenty of character into everything she does. The B-side is a cover of "Hospital Beds" by Cold War Kids, which really showcases Florence's voice."

411mania.com described "Kiss with a Fist" as a track featuring punky, distorted and assertive female vocals built around the controversial notion that "A kiss with a fist is better than none".

The B-side, the band's cover of "Hospital Beds" by the Cold War Kids has been described as "exemplifying their acoustic bar/pub goodness".

== Chart performance ==
"Kiss with a Fist" debuted at #58 on the UK Singles Chart on 16 August 2008. The following week it rose seven places to #51 and in total spending two weeks within the top 100. The single is Florence + The Machine's fifth most successful single to-date, outpeaking "Drumming Song". As of July 2018 in United Kingdom combined sales stand at 135,000.

== Music video ==
On 4 June 2008 the music video for "Kiss with a Fist" was uploaded onto YouTube five days before the single's official release. It was directed by Price James and produced by Julia Frost of Black Dog Films. It has received over 6,000,000 views on Florence + The Machine's VEVO YouTube channel alone.

The video takes on an eighties-styled theme and primarily takes place in a room of white-coloured background. It features Florence dressed in a cheeky punk themed outfit, running around - kicking, screaming in turn exclaiming how forceful love can be to contrast with the song's lyrical intention.

== Usage in media ==
The track was featured on the soundtrack to the films Wild Child, Jennifer's Body, and St. Trinian's 2: The Legend of Fritton's Gold, as well as in the television series 90210, Saving Grace, Community, Chuck,The Good Doctor, and This Is Going to Hurt.

The song was used by Sky Sports to promote the 2013 Investec Ashes Series played between England & Australia.

== Track listing and formats ==
UK CD Promo

1. "Kiss with a Fist" - 2:04

UK 7" Vinyl/UK CD Promo

1. "Kiss with a Fist" — 2:04
2. "Hospital Beds" — 2:14

== Charts ==
Chart (2008)	Peak position
Australia Hitseekers (ARIA)	10
UK Singles (Official Charts)	51

== Certifications ==
Region	Certification	Certified units/sales
United Kingdom (BPI)	Silver	200,000^{‡}
United States (RIAA)	Gold	500,000^{‡}
^{‡} Sales+streaming figures based on certification alone.
