= Candi Staton discography =

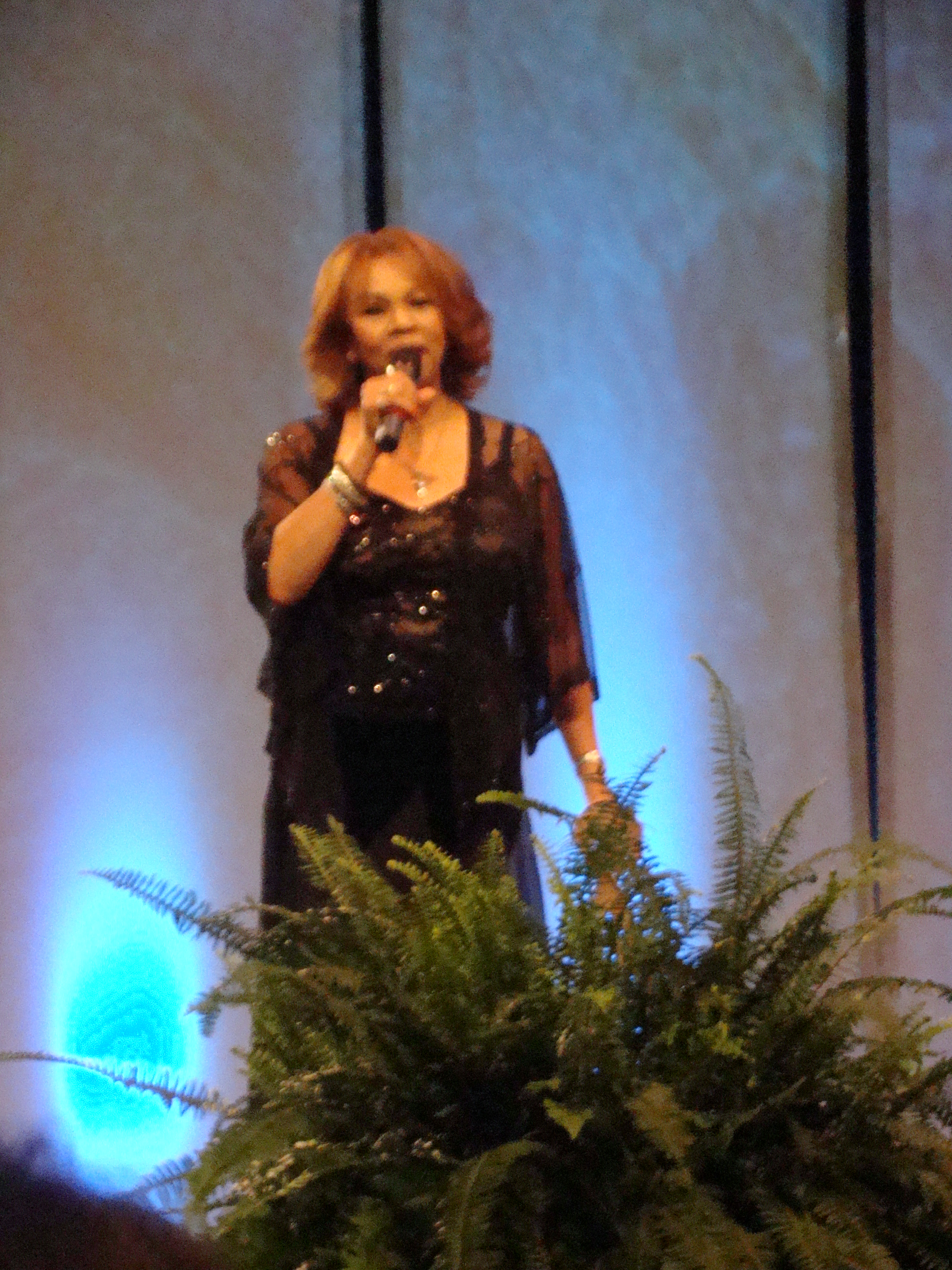
- Candi Staton
- Studio albums: 28
- Singles: 13
- Music videos: ?

The discography of American soul and gospel singer Candi Staton consists of 28 studio albums and over 30 singles.

== Studio albums ==
Year	Album details	Peak chart positions											
Year	Album details	US Pop	US R&B	US Gos	US Bls	AUS	CAN	GER	IRE	NL	NZ	NOR	UK
1970	I'm Just a Prisoner: Released: 1970; Label: FAME/Capitol; Format: LP	—	37	—	—	—	—	—	—	—	—	—	—
1971	Stand By Your Man: Released: 1971; Label: FAME/Capitol; Format: LP	188	12	—	—	—	—	—	—	—	—	—	—
1972	Candi Staton: Released: 1972; Label: FAME/United Artists; Format: LP	—	—	—	—	—	—	—	—	—	—	—	—
1974	Candi: Released: 1974; Label: Warner Brothers; Format: LP	—	54	—	—	—	—	—	—	—	—	—	—
1976	Young Hearts Run Free: Released: 1976; Label: Warner Brothers; Format: LP	129	14	—	—	27	—	—	—	—	—	—	34
1977	Music Speaks Louder than Words: Released: 1977; Label: Warner Brothers; Format: LP	—	46	—	—	—	—	—	—	—	—	—	—
1978	House of Love: Released: 1978; Label: Warner Brothers; Format: LP	—	19	—	—	—	—	—	—	—	—	—	—
1979	Chance: Released: 1979; Label: Warner Brothers; Format: LP	129	23	—	—	—	—	—	—	—	—	—	—
1980	Candi Staton: Released: 1980; Label: Warner Brothers; Format: LP	—	—	—	—	—	—	—	—	75	—	—	—
1982	Nightlites: Released: 1982; Label: Sugar Hill; Format: LP	—	—	—	—	—	—	—	—	—	—	—	—
1983	Make Me an Instrument: Released: 1983; Label: Beracah; Format: LP	—	—	7	—	—	—	—	—	—	—	—	—
1985	The Anointing: Released: 1985; Label: Beracah; Format: LP	—	—	29	—	—	—	—	—	—	—	—	—
1986	Sing a Song: Released: 1986; Label: Beracah; Format: LP	—	—	7	—	—	—	—	—	—	—	—	—
1988	Love Lifted Me: Released: 1988; Label: Beracah; Format: LP	—	—	13	—	—	—	—	—	—	—	—	—
1990	Stand Up and Be a Witness: Released: 1990; Label: Beracah; Format: CD	—	—	—	—	—	—	—	—	—	—	—	—
1991	Standing on the Promises: Released: 1991; Label: Beracah; Format: CD	—	—	14	—	—	—	—	—	—	—	—	—
1993	I Give You Praise: Released: 1993; Label: Beracah; Format: CD	—	—	—	—	—	—	—	—	—	—	—	—
1995	It's Time!: Released: 1995; Label: Beracah; Format: CD	—	—	—	—	—	—	—	—	—	—	—	—
1997	Cover Me: Released: 1997; Label: Beracah; Format: CD	—	—	15	—	—	—	—	—	—	—	—	—
1999	Outside In: Released: 1999; Label: React; Format: CD	—	—	—	—	—	—	—	—	—	—	—	—
2000	Here's a Blessing: Released: 2000; Label: Beracah; Format: CD	—	—	—	—	—	—	—	—	—	—	—	—
2000	Christmas in My Heart: Released: 2000; Label: Beracah; Format: CD	—	—	—	—	—	—	—	—	—	—	—	—
2001	Glorify: Released: 2001; Label: Beracah; Format: CD	—	—	—	—	—	—	—	—	—	—	—	—
2002	Proverbs 31 Woman: Released: 2002; Label: Beracah; Format: CD	—	—	—	—	—	—	—	—	—	—	—	—
2006	His Hands: Released: 2006; Label: Honest Jon's/Astralwerks; Format: CD	—	—	—	15	—	—	—	—	58	—	—	—
2006	The Ultimate Gospel Collection: Released: 2006; Label: Shanachie; Format: CD	—	—	—	—	—	—	—	—	—	—	—	—
2008	I Will Sing My Praise to You: Released: 2008; Label: Emtro/Beracah; Format: CD	—	—	50	—	—	—	—	—	—	—	—	—
2009	Who's Hurting Now?: Released: Spring 2009; Label: Honest Jon's; Format: LP/CD	—	—	—	—	—	—	—	—	—	—	—	—
2014	Life Happens: Released: May 2014; Label: Beracah/FAME; Format: CD	—	—	—	10	—	—	—	—	—	—	—	—
2025	Back to My Roots: Released: February 2025; Label: Beracah; Format: CD	—	—	—	—	—	—	—	—	—	—	—	—
"—" denotes releases that did not chart or were not released in that territory.

== Singles ==
Year	Single	Chart Positions				Certifications
Year	Single	US Pop	US R&B	AUS	UK	Certifications
1969	"I'd Rather Be an Old Man's Sweetheart (Than a Young Man's Fool)"	46	9	—	—	
1969	"Never in Public"	—	22	—	—	
1970	"I'm Just a Prisoner (Of Your Good Lovin')"	56	13	—	—	
1970	"Sweet Feeling"	60	5	—	—	
1970	"Stand by Your Man"	24	4	—	—	
1971	"He Called Me Baby"	52	9	—	—	
1971	"Mr. and Mrs. Untrue"	109	20	—	—	
1972	"In the Ghetto"	48	12	—	—	
1972	"Lovin' You, Lovin' Me"	83	40	—	—	
1973	"Do It in the Name of Love"	63	17	—	—	
1973	"Something's Burning"	—	83	—	—	
1973	"Love Chain"	—	31	—	—	
1974	"As Long as He Takes Care of Home"	51	6	—	—	
1975	"Here I Am Again"	—	35	—	—	
1975	"Six Nights and a Day"	—	86	—	—	
1976	"Young Hearts Run Free"	20	1	4	2	BPI: Platinum
1976	"Run to Me"	—	26	—	60 (Note: Chart position is from the official UK "Breakers List".)	
1976	"Destiny"	—	—	—	41	
1977	"A Dreamer of a Dream"	—	37	—	—	
1977	"Nights on Broadway"	102	16	—	6	BPI: Silver
1977	"Listen to the Music"	—	90	—	—	
1978	"Victim"	—	17	—	—	
1978	"Honest I Do Love You"	—	77	—	48	
1979	"When You Wake Up Tomorrow"	—	13	—	—	
1980	"Looking for Love"	—	42	—	—	
1981	"Without You I Cry"	—	78	—	—	
1981	"Count On Me"	—	82	—	—	
1982	"Suspicious Minds"	—	—	—	31	
1986	"Young Hearts Run Free" (Remix)	—	—	—	47	
1986	"You Got the Love"	—	88	—	95	
1991	"You Got the Love"; The Source feat. Candi Staton (reissue)	—	—	—	4	BPI: Platinum
1997	"You Got the Love"; The Source feat. Candi Staton (Remix)	—	—	—	3	BPI: Platinum
1999	"Love on Love"	—	—	—	27	
1999	"Young Hearts Run Free" (re-recording)	—	—	—	29	
"—" denotes releases that did not chart or were not released in that territory.
