= Frankie Knuckles discography =

The discography of American DJ Frankie Knuckles consists of two studio albums, a compilation album and twenty-two singles.

His debut studio album Beyond the Mix was released on August 6, 1991, via Virgin Records America. It peaked in the United Kingdom at 59th. His second studio album Welcome to the Real World was released four years later on May 23, 1995, also via Virgin Records. The album is a collaborative project with Adeva. On January 1, 2013, he released the compilation album Greatest – Frankie Knuckles via Trax Records.

== Studio albums ==
Title	Details	Peak chart positions
Title	Details	UK
Beyond the Mix	Released: August 6, 1991; Label: Virgin Records America, Inc; Format: Digital download, CD Vinyl	59
Welcome to the Real World (with Adeva)	Released: May 23, 1995; Label: Virgin Records America, Inc; Format: Digital download, CD	—

== Compilation albums ==
Title	Details
Greatest – Frankie Knuckles	Released: January 1, 2013; Label: Trax Records; Format: Digital download, CD

== Singles ==
Year	Single	Peak chart positions				Album
Year	Single	US Dance	US R&B/HH	NED	UK	Album
1986	"You Can't Hide from Yourself"	—	—	—	—	Non-album singles
1987	"Only the Strong Survive"	—	—	—	—	Non-album singles
1987	"Baby Wants to Ride" (featuring Jamie Principle)	—	—	—	84	Non-album singles
1987	"It's a Cold World" (featuring Jamie Principle)	—	—	—	—	Non-album singles
1989	"Tears" (featuring Robert Owens)	10	—	—	50	Non-album singles
1989	"Ain't Nobody (Remix)" (by Rufus & Chaka Khan)	—	—	—	6	Life Is a Dance – The Remix Project
1989	"Your Love" (featuring Jamie Principle)	—	—	—	59	Non-album singles
1990	"Move Your Body (Frankie Knuckles '90 Remix)" (by Marshall Jefferson)	—	—	—	100	Non-album singles
1991	"The Whistle Song"	1	62	29	17	Beyond the Mix
1991	"It's Hard Sometime"	10	78	—	67	Beyond the Mix
1992	"Workout"	1	—	—	—	Beyond the Mix
1992	"Rain Falls"	1	—	—	48	Beyond the Mix
1992	"Hangin' on a String (Frankie Knuckles Remix)" (by Loose Ends)	—	—	—	25	Tighten Up Vol. 1
1995	"Too Many Fish"	1	97	—	34	Welcome to the Real World (with Adeva)
1995	"Whadda U Want (From Me)"	3	—	—	36	Welcome to the Real World (with Adeva)
1995	"Walkin'"	5	—	—	—	Welcome to the Real World (with Adeva)
1996	"Love Can Change It"	18	—	—	—	Welcome to the Real World (with Adeva)
2001	"Keep on Movin'" (featuring Nicki Richards)	11	—	—	143	Motivation
2004	"Bac N Da Day" (featuring Jamie Principle)	1	—	—	163	A New Reality
2004	"Matter of Time" (featuring Nicki Richards)	6	—	—	—	A New Reality
2006	"The Whistle Song Revisited"	2	—	—	—	DubJ's D'light (A Remixed Reality)
2007	"Gimme Gimme (Disco Shimmy)"	6	—	—	—	DubJ's D'light (A Remixed Reality)
"—" denotes releases that did not chart or were not released.

== Remixes ==
- "Change" – Lisa Stansfield
- "Someday (I'm Coming Back)" – Lisa Stansfield
- "Never, Never Gonna Give You Up" – Lisa Stansfield
- "Let the Music (Use You)" – The Nightwriters
- "Turn It Out" – Patti LaBelle
- "Deep Love" – Dada Nada (Robert Ozn) (Remixed by Knuckles and David Morales)
- "Power of Love/Love Power" – Luther Vandross
- "Left to My Own Devices" – Pet Shop Boys
- "This Time" – Chanté Moore
- "Happy" – Towa Tei
- "Let No Man Put Asunder" – First Choice
- "Ain't Nobody" – Chaka Khan
- "Watcha Gonna Do with My Lovin'" – Inner City
- "Talking with Myself" – Electribe 101
- "The Pressure Part 1" – Sounds of Blackness
- "Where Love Lives" – Alison Limerick
- "I Want a Dog" – Pet Shop Boys
- "Notgonnachange" – Swing Out Sister
- "Time Will Tell" – Nu Shooz
- "Because of Love" – Janet Jackson
- "Love Hangover" – Diana Ross
- "Let Me Wake Up in Your Arms" – Lulu
- "Bring Me Love" – Andrea Mendez
- "Lucky Love" – Ace of Base
- "Rock with You" – Michael Jackson
- "Scream" (remixed by Knuckles and David Morales) – Michael Jackson
- "Thriller" (remixed by Knuckles and David Morales) – Michael Jackson
- "You Are Not Alone" – Michael Jackson
- "Closer Than Close" – Rosie Gaines
- "Un-break My Heart" – Toni Braxton
- "I Don't Want To" – Toni Braxton
- "Sunshine" – Gabrielle
- "Baby I" – Ariana Grande
- "I'm Going to Go" – Jago
- "Blind" – Hercules & Love Affair
- "You've Got the Love" – The Source featuring Candi Staton
- "Million Dollar Bill" – Whitney Houston
- "Forever Came Today" – The Jackson 5 (Released On The Remix Suite)
- "Wrong" – Depeche Mode
- "Don't Wait" – Mapei
- "Reflections" – Isabel Rose
- "If I Fall" – Myon & Shane 54 with Cole Plante
- "Can I Touch You There" – Michael Bolton
- "Hot Stuff" (remixed by Knuckles and Eric Krupper) – Donna Summer
- "Love Never Felt So Good" (Remixed by Knuckles and D.M.) – Michael Jackson
- 'Give Me All" (Chaka Khan)
