= John Truelove =

Record producer and entrepreneur

John Truelove (born 6 December 1962) is an English record producer, DJ and music entrepreneur.

== Music production career ==
=== Beginnings ===
Truelove's career as a record producer began with the 'Truelove' bootlegs which fused a cappella vocals with current instrumental dance tracks. The most successful of these, in collaboration with DJ Eren (Eren Abdullah), combined Candi Staton's vocals from the Source's "You Got the Love" with Jamie Principle's "Your Love" (frequently, but incorrectly, credited to Frankie Knuckles who also made his own version of "Your Love"). After distributing the bootleg himself, Truelove secured permission from the owners of Candi Staton's vocal performance to legitimise the release. He made various new mixes, including a re-recording of the Jamie Principle element, adopting and using the artist name The Source. Seeking a record company to release the master, a meeting with James Horrocks, formerly founder and director of Rhythm King Records, led to a deal with the newly formed React Music. "You Got the Love" entered the UK Singles Chart at number 30 in February 1991, and reached number 4 after five weeks, earning a silver disc (200,000 sales) in the process.

=== "You Got the Love" further versions and releases ===
"You Got the Love" (Now Voyager mix) was released in February 1997 and reached number 3 on the UK Singles Chart. The Now Voyager mix was slower than the 1991 version and used breakbeats, orchestral strings, piano and a 'wall of sound' mix approach. The Now Voyager mix was also used for the closing credits of the final episode of the HBO series Sex and the City.

"You Got the Love" was re-released by Positiva / EMI in 2006, reaching number 7 on the UK Singles Chart. The radio version of this release was a slower re-arranged version of the Now Voyager Mix, and included live strings scored by David Cullen and performed by the London Session Orchestra, with backing vocals by Beverley Skeete.

The Now Voyager mix later provided the basis for Florence and the Machine's cover version of "You Got the Love", which featured on their 2009 debut album Lungs and was released as a single, reaching number 5 on the UK Singles Chart in 2010. Following the BRIT Awards ceremony on 16 February 2010, where Florence and the Machine were joined on-stage by Dizzee Rascal for a performance of "You Got the Love" combined with Dizzee Rascal's "Dirtee Cash", the mash-up version "You Got the Dirtee Love" was released as a single by Universal Island, reaching number 2 on the UK Singles Chart. All royalty proceeds from the first month of the single's release were donated to the BRIT Trust charity. Sheet music for the Florence and the Machine version of "You Got the Love" was published by Wise Publications in the Florence and the Machine Lungs songbook on 3 November 2009.

=== Further productions ===
"Rock the House", which sampled the vocals of Miami house artist Nicole, entered the top 75 of the UK Singles Chart in 1991. Other notable The Source productions include "Sanctuary of Love", released on Hooj Choons in 1993, and "Clouds", a cover of the Chaka Khan track, sung by her sister Taka Boom, released on XL Recordings and which reached number 38 in 1997. Truelove has also released records as Lectrolux and under his own name.

=== As a DJ and performer ===
From 1997 onwards, Truelove had a couple of overseas gigs where he played records with no DJing skills to speak of, often with his partner of the time, former fashion designer turned DJ and record producer, Rachel Auburn. He played clubs and events in South Africa, Japan, Australia, New Zealand and the UK. In 2003, he developed his electronic solo act Lectrolux for live performance, creating a 60-minute film with filmmaker Dick Jewell, which was projected onto large screens during his set. Debuting at London's Brixton Academy in December 2003, Lectrolux then toured Australia in early 2004.

== Business career ==
=== Beginnings ===
He established his own production company, Truelove Limited, followed by his publishing entity, Truelove Music, in 1991. In 1992, Truelove was recruited by Dave Balfe, former manager of the Teardrop Explodes and owner of Food Records, to set up a new electronic dance label funded and distributed by EMI. The partnership resulted in two labels – iT and Synthetic – the former dedicated to acid house and trance, the latter concentrating on more contemporary electronica. Notable artists signed to iT and Synthetic include Sister Bliss (later to form Faithless) who delivered her first remix, "A Merry Trance" by D: Code for iT in 1991, whilst Synthetic released Goldie's "Terminator" single under his and Rob Playford's Metalheads alias in 1992. Truelove's relationship with Dave Balfe ended in early 1993 after Truelove released The Source track "Sanctuary of Love" on another label. A court case followed in which Balfe tried to lay claim to ownership to "Sanctuary of Love". The case was resolved in Truelove's favour in 1994.

=== Truelove Label Collective ===
The Truelove Label Collective began when John established the Magnetic North label with Dave Clarke in 1994. Signing artists such as Woody McBride and Cristian Vogel alongside Dave Clarke, Magnetic North released 14 12" EPs and the 'Demagnetized' compilation album until Dave's other DJ and recording commitments meant the label was dissolved in 1994. John also set up a new label, Truelove Electronic Communications (TeC) during this period. Following the success of Magnetic North and TeC, John and business partner Steve Simmonds began to set up labels for other artists. This became the Truelove Label Collective, which grew to encompass 18 different labels at its peak. Labels under the Truelove umbrella included Ferox run by Russ Gabriel, Boscaland run by Jon The Dentist and Torema run by Fumiya Tanaka. The Stay Up Forever label joined the Truelove Label Collective in 1995 and spawned its own offshoots such as Cluster, Hydraulix and RAW, and the successful "It's Not Intelligent, It's Not From Detroit, But It's Fuckin' Avin' It!" mix compilation series. When the Truelove Label Collective was dissolved in 1999, the Liberator DJs adapted the Truelove template and infrastructure to form the Stay Up Forever Collective.

=== Truelove Music Publishing ===
==== Company structure and development ====
Since 2000, Truelove has concentrated his efforts on his music publishing company, Truelove Music. The Truelove Music catalogue currently stands at over 7000 songs, and now focuses primarily on developing music for film, TV and special projects. The roster includes composers like Gui Boratto, Woody McBride and John Graham, and notable films to feature Truelove Music Publishing music include Layer Cake, The Football Factory and The Spirit. TV synchs include music for Sky Sports UK, Damages and Sex and the City.

==== Memberships and affiliations ====
He has sat on the panel of the MCPS (Mechanical Copyright Protection Society) – PRS For Music (formerly the Performing Rights Society) Alliance. Truelove Music Publishing is also affiliated with a number of other music industry bodies including PPL and Music Publishers Association in the UK, ASCAP and BMI in the USA, GEMA in Germany, STIM in Sweden, UBC (Brazilian Union of Composers), and BUMA STEMRA in the Netherlands. John is currently a board director at PRS, a board director at IMPEL, chair of the PRS Dance Committee, a PRS Distribution Committee member, a PRS Licensing Committee member, a board of advisers member at the Association For Electronic Music (AFEM) and was a board director at the Music Publishers Association (MPA) from 2012 to 2018.

==== Campaigns ====
Truelove campaigned throughout the 1990s for the Performing Rights Society and the Mechanical Copyright Protection Society to take dance music more seriously, arguing that procedures for collecting royalties at the time unfairly discriminated against dance music by focusing primarily on live performances rather than recorded music played in licensed premises. As a result, a market research company is now commissioned to conduct an ongoing survey of UK premises licensed by the PRS where copyright music may be played, whether from a radio, on a musical instrument or over a soundsystem, and be it in a pub, a hotel lobby, a hair salon or a club. The data collected lists the music played and is used by PRS to pay royalties and ensure a more equitable distribution of income. John also took an active role in a campaign to abolish the Classical Music Subsidy, which subsidised classical music performances with a levy taken from performance income derived from pubs and clubs. He gave evidence to the UK Parliament's Select Committee on Culture, Media and Sport on this issue in 1999. In 2011 John chaired a panel at the International Music Summit in Ibiza. John also chaired another IMS panel on publishing in Ibiza in May 2012.

=== Tortured Artists ===
He established the artist management company, Tortured Artists Ltd with Steve Simmonds in 1996. Notable artists to have been managed by Tortured Artists include Mauro Picotto, DJ Rankin, D.A.V.E The Drummer, Micky Modelle, Chris Liberator and Kevin Saunderson alias Inner City.
