= Danny Alias =

American dramatist

Danny Alias (Duane Scott Cerny) is an American house music artist and playwright born in Norridge, Illinois. In 1984, he co-founded Persona Records with David Bell and released the single "Civil Defense," an early example of Chicago house music which was played by DJ Ron Hardy. The label went on to release the first two singles by Jamie Principle and Frankie Knuckles: "Waiting on My Angel" and "Your Love". In 2012, "Civil Defense" was re-issued on Kill the DJ, a French label founded by DJ Ivan Smagghe.

In 1990, Alias created Chicago's Broadway Antique Market, a 20,000 square-foot multi-dealer shop specializing in mid-century modern collectibles. In 2018, Thunderground Press published his book Selling Dead People's Things: Inexplicably True Tales, Vintage Fails & Objects of Objectionable Estates with anecdotes from his career as a vintage dealer.

Alias has also written two LGBT comedic spoofs, "Mrs. Hyde and the Case of the Gaslight Buggerings," which debuted at the Athenaeum Theatre in 2009, and "The Bloody Fabulous Curse of Dragula," which debuted at Mary's Attic Theatre in 2010.
