= The Source (British group) =

British musical project

The Source was originally an alias for the British songwriting team of Anthony B. Stephens, Arnecia Michelle Harris and John Bellamy, best known for their track "You Got the Love" with American singer Candi Staton. In 1989, British DJ Eren Abdullah overlaid the vocal over Frankie Knuckles' remix of "Your Love" by Jamie Principle. This was sold as a bootleg until, in 1991, British producer John Truelove released several commercial remixes of "You Got the Love" on his label, Truelove. Truelove continued to release music as The Source, until he began using the name Now Voyager.

== Biography ==
The original members of The Source wrote the 1986 single release "You Got the Love", which featured Candi Staton on vocals. This was released as a Candi Staton single in the UK, peaking at 95 in the singles chart, and as The Source featuring Candi Staton in the US, peaking at number 88 in the Hot R&B/Hip-Hop chart.

In 1989, DJ Eren (Eren Abdullah), a club DJ in London, put Candi Staton's vocals (from The Source's "House Apella" version) over an early house track by Frankie Knuckles and Jamie Principle called "Your Love", which became a club hit. This version was also released in 1989 by British producer/DJ John Truelove as The Source, on a vinyl bootleg EP known as Love/Rock.

Truelove then adopted the name The Source for himself, and continued releasing records using the name. The mash-up of "You Got the Love", credited to The Source featuring Candi Staton, charted in 1991 in an official release, reaching number 4 on the UK Singles Chart. In 1997, it was remixed and released again by Truelove, this time under the alias Now Voyager, reaching one spot higher at number 3.

Truelove signed with XL Recordings in 1997 and released a 12-inch EP called Clouds, featuring four different mixes of the Chaka Khan song "Clouds" sung by Khan's sister, Yvonne Stevens, a.k.a. Taka Boom.

In 2006, "You Got the Love" was remixed and re-released yet again, reaching number 7.

In 2009, Florence + the Machine released a version titled "You've Got the Love" from the album Lungs.

Now Voyager began as a band started by Truelove in 1996. He recruited Louise De Fraine (vocals), Chris Harvey (guitar) and Larry Lush (programming, keyboards). Despite writing and showcasing an album of material, the band failed to secure a significant record deal.

== Context ==
Candi Staton was unaware of the record's existence until she was told that she had a number 1 single: "They were calling my house saying I had a number one record in England, and I said, 'What song? I haven't released any song.' When they told me it was "You Got the Love", I said I'd never made a record called that. Then I got off the phone and realised - it was the one from the diet video! Which was never supposed to be put on a record at all".

== Critical acclaim ==
"You Got the Love" was chosen by the BBC as one of the top fifty singles of the 1990s as part of its Pop on Trial series.

== Discography ==
Year	Single	Peak positions		
Year	Single	UK	AUS	NED
1991	"You Got the Love" (featuring Candi Staton)	4	—	—
1992	"Rock the House" (featuring Nicole)	63	—	—
1993	"Sanctuary of Love" (featuring Zhana)	—	—	—
1997	"You Got the Love (Now Voyager Mix)" (featuring Candi Staton)	3	—	—
1997	"Clouds"	38	—	—
2005	"You Got the Love" (re-entry) (featuring Candi Staton)	60	—	—
2006	"You Got the Love (New Voyager Mix)" (featuring Candi Staton)	7	57	8

Others

- 2009: "You've Got the Love" by Florence and the Machine (for chart positions, see song page)
