= Cold World =

Cold World may refer to:

- Cold World (Godflesh EP), 1991
- Cold World (Eric Reprid EP), 2020
- "Cold World" (Steve "Silk" Hurley song), 1989, featuring Jamie Principle
- "Cold World" (GZA song), 1995
- Cold World, a 2014 album by Naomi Shelton & the Gospel Queens
- Cold World (Of Mice & Men album), 2016
- "Cold World", a 2021 song by G Herbo from the album 25
- Cold World, a band signed to Deathwish Inc.
