= You Got the Love =

1986 single by the Source featuring Candi Staton

- UK 7-inch variant of the 1991 re-release

Single by the Source featuring Candi Staton
- Released: 1 December 1986
- Genre: House
- Length: 4:05 (radio mix); 3:15 (Now Voyager radio edit); 3:35 (Now Voyager radio mix)
- Label: Streetwave (1986); Truelove (1991); React (1997); Positiva (2006)
- Songwriters: Anthony B. Stephens; Arnecia Michelle Harris; John Bellamy
- Producer: The Source

Music video
- "You Got the Love" (1997 version) on YouTube

"You Got the Love" is a song by British songwriting team the Source featuring American singer Candi Staton. Originally released in December 1986, the song was remixed and re-released in 1991, 1997, and 2006. It has reached number three on the UK Singles Chart, number two on the UK Dance Singles Chart and number one on the UK Club Chart.

The song has been covered by other artists, including as "You've Got the Love" by Florence and the Machine in 2009, which reached number five on the UK chart.

== Background and release ==
"They were calling my house saying I had a No. 1 record in England. And I said, 'What song? I haven't released any song.'"

— Candi Staton talking to The Guardian about the song.

The original version is a soul/disco/gospel track, written by Anthony B. Stephens, Arnecia Michelle Harris and John Bellamy. British DJ Simon Harris was the first person to discover and license the song in 1986 when he was looking for tracks to release on his newly formed Music of Life label with DJ Froggy. Harris then took the track to Morgan Khan, the distributor of the new label, the track was licensed and released on Khan's StreetSounds Streetwave label. The original Candi Staton track had been recorded for a direct-to-video 1980s documentary about an obese man who was trying to lose weight. Staton said she couldn't remember having recorded a song called "You Got the Love". It was only later that she realised she had performed the song years earlier for the documentary. The producers of the video had selected the song for her to sing, but as they had no funds to pay her, they donated half of the copyright and publishing to Staton.

The Candi Staton a cappella version was originally mixed over an instrumental version of the Frankie Knuckles/Jamie Principle house song "Your Love". This bootleg release was a studio recording of Eren Abdullah mixing the two pieces of vinyl together. The DJ Eren "Original Bootleg" mix was released by John Truelove's record label in 1991 and reached number four on the UK Singles Chart.

It was re-issued in 1997 by React Music Limited in a new remixed version called the "Now Voyager Mix". This time the record reached number three, the song's highest position.

It was remixed again in 2006 by Now Voyager, and this new version was called the "New Voyager Mix" (instead of "Now"), and was back with further new mixes by the Shapeshifters amongst others. This time the rights to the record were picked up by EMI's Positiva label (also the label the Shapeshifters were signed to), who scored another top ten hit, when the track reached number seven. The 2006 mix also featured more lyrics than the first two versions.

The "Original Bootleg Radio Mix" of the track was featured in the film Layer Cake in the club when Sidney talks to the film's protagonist as he looks on at Sidney's girlfriend. The song was used on the series finale of the series Sex and the City, and also the series finale of Gossip Girl. The Now Voyager Remix of the song was used for the theme tune of live Football League coverage on Sky Sports until the start of the 2014–15 season.

== Critical reception ==
On 19 January 1991, Music Week named "You Got the Love" Pick of the Week. Mandi James from NME wrote, "Bootlegs have kept the dancefloor boiling, provided healthy competition for the influx of white labels and given inspiration in the face of Technotronic megamixes. The best ideas have always been the most breathtakingly simple and usually caused the most consternation. 'You Got the Love' by the Source featuring Candi Staton, formerly known as 'Love/Rock', pays testimony to both those principles. It's an inspired combination of uplifting gospel vocals and Jamie Principle's proto-house classic 'Your Love', is currently sitting comfortably in the Top 40, and has a chequered history to match Black Box's 'Ride on Time'."

Upon the 1997 remix, Alan Jones from Music Week commented, "A brilliant marriage of two different records, the Source featuring Candi Staton's "You Got the Love" was a truly inspired amalgam, well deserving its top five status in 1991. Six years on, it has been extensively remixed by the Rhythm Masters and David Morales & Frankie Knuckles. The new mixes work well, although the 1991 mixes remain the best. Well worth another outing." James Hyman from the Record Mirror Dance Update gave the 1997 remix a top score of five out of five, adding, "Now 'Voyager's Epic' (which is managing to gain considerable airplay) borrows from Elgar's 'Enigma Variations' and, with the vocal, creates a parallel to Massive Attack's 'Unfinished Sympathy' via an uplifting and spinetingling surge."

== Music video ==
The planned 1986 video was supposed to feature a 900 pounds (410 kg) man wanting to lose weight. The filming was shelved when the actor portraying the character lost his weight to around 300 pounds (140 kg).

The 1991 video shows silhouettes of men and women dancing on a white background, sometimes as individuals, couples or in groups, intercut with a sequence of close-ups of different faces miming to the lyrics. Grainy footage of a Northern line London Underground train entering a station also appears.

The 1997 video features the "Now Voyager mix" and portrays a man dressed like a friar carrying a cross being guided by an angel and tempted by the Devil.

The 2006 version features the "New Voyager mix" in a black and white video. Set in London, it portrays an angelic young man (played by Neil Newbon) watching over the poor, lonely and vulnerable in the streets, subways and gardens. (Referencing the Wim Wenders film Wings of Desire)

== Impact and legacy ==
Mixmag ranked the song number 33 in its "100 Greatest Dance Singles of All Time" list in 1996, adding:

Sometimes you feel like throwing your hands up in the air. And that's exactly when you want to hear this record.

English house music DJ, DJ Paulette named the song one of her favourites in 1996, saying, "This is one of my desert island discs. It came out in about 1991/1992 and it's just fantastic, so strong. I remember the video being shown on TOTP, it charted really highly. The energy of the track is inspirational."

Time Out listed the song number seven in their "The 100 best party songs" list in 2018, adding,

This is the one time it is absolutely acceptable to shriek a song. You do it because nobody, not Florence, nobody, can match Candi Staton’s voice. She sings it and everyone else shrieks it in homage to one of the great vocals of all time.

=== Accolades ===
| Year | Publisher | Country | Accolade | Rank |
|---|---|---|---|---|
| 1996 | Mixmag | United Kingdom | "100 Greatest Dance Singles of All Time" | 33 |
| 2004 | IDJ | United States | "The 50 Greatest Dance Singles" | 22 |
| 2004 | Q | United Kingdom | "The 1010 Songs You Must Own" | * |
| 2013 | Robert Dimery | United States | "1,001 Songs You Must Hear Before You Die" | * |
| 2018 | Time Out | United Kingdom | "100 Best Party Songs" | 7 |
| 2020 | PopMatters | United States | "15 Landmark Dance Tracks of 1991" | * |
| 2020 | Tomorrowland | Belgium | "Ibiza Top 500" | 33 |

(*) indicates the list is not in any particular order.

== Track listings ==
- 1986 original version

A1. "You Got the Love" (House Radio) — 4:27
A2. "You Got the Love" (Extended Vocal) — 6:45
B1. "You Got the Love" (House Apella) — 7:07
B2. "You Got the Love" (Club House) — 8:07

- 1989 version
1. "Untitled (You Got the Love / Your Love)"
- 1991 version
1. "You Got the Love" (Extended Vocal)
2. "You Got the Love" (Radio Edit)
3. "You Got the Love" (Club House)
4. "You Got the Love" (House Apella)
5. "You Got the Love" (Eren's Bootleg Mix)
6. "You Got the Love" (Morning Time Mix)
- 1991 Trax USA version
1. "Frankie Knuckles – Your Love / You Got the Love (Remix)" (Trax Records – TX 202)
- 1997 UK version
1. "You Got the Love" (Now Voyager Radio Mix)
2. "You Got the Love" (Now Voyager Mix)
- 2006 UK version
1. "You Got the Love" (New Voyager Radio Edit)
2. "You Got the Love" (Shapeshifters Radio Edit)
3. "You Got the Love" (Extended New Voyager Mix)
4. "You Got the Love" (Shapeshifter Main Vocal Mix)
5. "You Got the Love" (Truelove, Lys & Gigi Remix)
6. "You Got the Love" (Paradise Soul Mix)
7. Enhanced video
- Australian version
1. "You Got the Love" (Now Voyager Radio Mix)
2. "You Got the Love" (Original Radio Edit)
3. "You Got the Love" (Truelove, Lys, & Gigi Remix)
4. "You Got the Love" (Shapeshifters Main Vocal Mix)
5. "You Got the Love" (Shapeshifters Alt. Mix)
6. "You Got the Love" (Now Voyager Mix)
7. "You Got the Love" (Original Mix)
8. "You Got the Love" (Paradise Soul Mix)
9. "You Got the Love" (Rhythm Masters Classic Vocal Mix)
10. "You Got the Love" (Asle Bjorn Remix)
11. "You Got the Love" (Wayne G Circuit Anthem Mix)
- 2012 Hungarian version
1. "You've Got the Love 2k12" (House Gangsters & Mr. Tom Wave meets. F.A.T.M. remix)
- 2015 official remix
1. "You Got the Love" (Yuga featuring Candi Staton)
2. "You Got the Love" (Dr. Shiver – Candi Staton featuring Doc M.C.)

== Charts ==
=== Weekly charts ===
| Chart (1986) | Peak position |
|---|---|
| UK Singles (Official Charts) | 95 |
| US Hot R&B/Hip-Hop Songs (Billboard) | 88 |

| Chart (1991) | Peak position |
|---|---|
| Austria (Ö3 Austria Top 40) | 20 |
| Israel (Israeli Singles Chart) | 8 |
| Luxembourg (Radio Luxembourg) | 3 |
| Netherlands (Dutch Top 40 Tipparade) | 12 |
| Netherlands (Single Top 100) | 69 |
| UK Singles (Official Charts) | 4 |
| UK Airplay (Music Week) | 11 |
| UK Dance (Music Week) | 2 |

| Chart (1997) | Peak position |
|---|---|
| Belgium (Ultratip Bubbling Under Flanders) | 3 |
| Europe (Eurochart Hot 100) | 26 |
| Ireland (IRMA) | 28 |
| Israel (Israeli Singles Chart) | 26 |
| Netherlands (Dutch Top 40) | 25 |
| Netherlands (Single Top 100) | 37 |
| Scottish Singles Sales (Official Charts) | 4 |
| UK Singles (Official Charts) | 3 |
| UK Dance (Official Charts) | 2 |
| UK Club Chart (Music Week) | 1 |
| UK Indie (Music Week) | 1 |

| Chart (2006) | Peak position |
|---|---|
| Australia (ARIA) | 57 |
| Belgium (Ultratop 50 Flanders) | 49 |
| Germany (GfK) | 67 |
| Ireland (IRMA) | 6 |
| Netherlands (Dutch Top 40) | 8 |
| Netherlands (Single Top 100) | 16 |
| UK Singles (Official Charts) | 7 |
| US Global Dance Tracks (Billboard) | 26 |

=== Year-end charts ===
| Chart (1991) | Position |
|---|---|
| UK Singles (OCC) | 31 |
| UK Club Chart (Record Mirror) | 4 |

| Chart (1997) | Position |
|---|---|
| UK Singles (OCC) | 89 |
| UK Club Chart (Music Week) | 8 |

| Chart (2006) | Position |
|---|---|
| Netherlands (Dutch Top 40) | 37 |
| Netherlands (Single Top 100) | 82 |
| UK Singles (OCC) | 71 |

== Certifications ==
| Region | Certification | Certified units/sales |
|---|---|---|
| United Kingdom (BPI) | Platinum | 600,000^{‡} |
^{‡} Sales+streaming figures based on certification alone.

== Release history ==
| Region | Version | Date | Format(s) | Label(s) | Ref. |
|---|---|---|---|---|---|
| United Kingdom | Original | 1 December 1986 | 7-inch vinyl; 12-inch vinyl | Streetwave | |
| United Kingdom | Erens Bootleg mix | 21 January 1991 | 7-inch vinyl; 12-inch vinyl; cassette | Truelove | |
| United Kingdom | Erens Bootleg mix | 4 February 1991 | CD | Truelove | |
| Australia | Erens Bootleg mix | 8 April 1991 | 7-inch vinyl; 12-inch vinyl; cassette | Liberation; Truelove | |
| United Kingdom | Now Voyager mix | 17 February 1997 | 12-inch vinyl; CD; cassette | React | |
| United Kingdom | New Voyager mix | 6 February 2006 | CD | Positiva | |

== Florence and the Machine version ==
"You've Got the Love"

Single by Florence and the Machine

from the album Lungs
- Released: 5 January 2009
- Genre: Dance
- Length: 2:48
- Label: Island
- Songwriters: Anthony B. Stephens; Arnecia Michelle Harris; John Bellamy
- Producer: Charlie Hugall

Florence and the Machine singles chronology
| "Drumming Song" (2009) | "You've Got the Love" (2009) | "You Got the Dirtee Love" (2010) |

Music video
- "You've Got the Love" on YouTube

The song was covered by English indie rock band Florence and the Machine as "You've Got the Love" and released as the fifth single from their debut album, Lungs (2009). It was first released on 1 December 2008 as the B-side to their second single "Dog Days Are Over". It was then later released as a digital download only single on 5 January 2009 in the United Kingdom only, after the mass praise it received during the release of "Dog Days Are Over". After being released before Lungs was finally recorded and released, it was later featured on the album as its bonus track.

The single was given a re-release on physical format on 16 November 2009 in the United Kingdom. For the reissue a music video was shot.

=== Background ===
The track, which is significantly shorter than the original, was produced by Charlie Hugall, who also produced three other tracks on Lungs. Hugall was also involved in the bass and percussion development of the song. The track features Isabella Summers on piano, Christopher Lloyd Hayden on drums, Tom Moth on harp, Rob Ackroyd on guitar and Florence Welch on vocals.

Florence Welch explained her inspiration behind covering "one of her favourite songs ever":

As a kid, going to clubs and raves, this song made me feel love. At Bestival last year we were top of the bill on that stage, so we were thinking of an amazing cover we could do, and I thought of Candi Staton. Even in rehearsals, playing it was just the most euphoric feeling. Then playing it live and seeing everyone's arms in the air, and the faces – it was the best feeling ever! I was dressed as a genie sea-monster, and I remember looking at my guitarist as we played the first chords, and then there was the reaction and it was like tearing ourselves open and just exploding on the crowd, and then all did it back. It's a feeling you couldn't express. I'm really excited that now in our live shows I'm going to be playing one of my favourite songs ever, loads.

"You've Got the Love" is a fan favourite of the band and has been played at numerous festivals around the United Kingdom during 2008 and 2009. Including the Bestival, Glastonbury, Way Out West, Brighton, Electric Picnic, Leeds, Smash & Grab and with an acoustic version being performed at a festival in Reading. It's also been performed Live In Ibiza on BBC Radio 1 and at the BBC Live Big Weekend. Florence also made a guest appearance during the xx's 2010 Glastonbury Festival performance, where they played their remix of the track. In 2013, a children's choir rendition of the song was used in TV spots for Coca-Cola. At Bestival 2014, Candi Staton performed the song live in a duet with Florence and the Machine.

=== Critical reception ===
"You've Got the Love" received positive reviews who notably commented on the song in reviews of "Dog Days Are Over". MusicOMH commented on the song by saying that "Following with her tradition of some finely chosen cover versions, there's even an excellent rendition of The Source's You Got the Love." Altsounds.com reviewed the track, writing, "You've Got the Love" is a standard pop number that does something in a non-standard fashion – it isn't afraid of looking at its simplistic melodic hooks and accepting it with a touch of lyrical honesty and contemplative imprint."

Contactmusic.com also commented on the song by saying that "The B-side cover of The Source ft. Candi Staton's "You Got the Love" is equally strong." Dailymusicguide.com also positively reviewed the single, writing, "Florence + The Machine have used the format of the original remix but have certainly breathed new life into this old classic. With Florence Welch's distinctive voice she makes this song her own. The inclusion of a harp only adds to the gentle sway effect produced by the track, bursting gently in without malice at around eighteen seconds in. The song's lyrics are empowering: Florence's heavenly voice has a vulnerable quality which, as it has with relatively short career so far, grows stronger through You've Got The Love's verse and chorus. It's empowering, liberating and moving all at the same time, not least conveyed by the emotion in Welch's vocals. Rating: 4/5"

=== Commercial performance ===
Upon its original release, "You've Got the Love" reached number 158 on the UK Singles Chart. The song later re-entered the chart at number 124 and moved up to number 68 in the next week's chart. The following week it fell to number 75 before dropping out of the top 100.

It then re-entered the chart, two weeks later on 22 August 2009 at number 59, where it peaked before dropping out the top 100 again. Its re-entry pattern then continued when it re-entered three weeks later on 12 September 2009 at number 88. The song peaked at number 16, after the single's actual release in 2009. It spent a total of eight weeks within the top 100, longer than both previous singles "Kiss with a Fist" and "Dog Days Are Over".

In November 2009, BBC Sport used the song at the end of the Formula One coverage of the 2009 Abu Dhabi Grand Prix (and the whole 2009 season) for a season review video which covered highlights of all 17 races that were held that year.

On 3 January 2010, "You've Got the Love" climbed 18 places to a new peak of number 13 on the UK Singles Chart after its use in the last episode of Gavin & Stacey on 1 January 2010. One week later, on 10 January 2010, the song peaked at number five in its 34th week on the chart, becoming the band's first top-10 single. Following their Brit performance in February 2010, "You've Got the Love" climbed to number 12, just missing out on the Top 10. It has spent 30 weeks on the UK Singles Chart. As of June 2018, the song has sold over 1.8 million combined sales/streams in that country.

On 8 January 2010, "You've Got the Love" climbed up the Irish Singles Chart, reaching a peak of number 21, whereas before it had only reached number 30. After falling out of the chart, on 26 February 2010, "You've Got the Love" re-entered the Irish chart, reaching a new peak of number 16.

In January, "You've got the Love" entered the Australian singles ARIA Charts at number 50, and remained within the top 50 for a large amount of time. In February and March, it was consistently increasing positions, where it eventually reached a peak of number 30. Due to popular television shows like Domestic Blitz and MasterChef Australia using it in commercials, the song rapidly climbed to number 17, on 4 April, and to its highest peak of number nine on 11 April. It hasn't been released as a physical single, and has relied solely on digital sales, where it has peaked at number five.

In New Zealand the single began receiving mainstream radio airplay causing it to rise to 50 on the airplay chart, however, the airplay has since dropped.

=== Music video ===
Despite originally being released as a single almost nine months earlier, the band announced on 18 September 2009 that a music video would be made for the song and would be shot on 21 September 2009 in London. It features Welch in a white, sparkly leotard dancing on a large moon-shaped platform suspended over a nightclub, an homage to Studio 54. The video later shows many people beneath her dancing to the song. The video that aired on United Kingdom television has a different version of the song to the one on the album.

=== Track listings ===
- Original release (digital download)
  1. "You've Got the Love" – 2:58
- UK CD single
  1. "You've Got the Love" – 2:49
  2. "You've Got the Love" (Tom Middleton Remix) – 7:51
  3. "Addicted to Love" – 3:20
- UK 7" single
  1. "You've Got the Love" (Single Version) – 2:40
  2. "You've Got the Love" (Jamie xx Re-work featuring the xx) – 5:36
- Digital EP
  1. "You've Got the Love" – 2:48
  2. "You've Got the Love" (Tom Middleton Remix) – 7:53
  3. "You've Got the Love" (Steve Pitron & Max Sanna Remix) – 6:21
  4. "You've Got the Love" (Live from Abbey Road) – 3:45

=== Charts ===
==== Weekly charts ====
| Chart (2009–2015) | Peak position |
|---|---|
| Australia (ARIA) | 9 |
| Australia Hitseekers (ARIA) | 1 |
| Austria (Ö3 Austria Top 40) | 28 |
| Belgium (Ultratop 50 Flanders) | 25 |
| Belgium (Ultratip Bubbling Under Wallonia) | 5 |
| Denmark Airplay (Tracklisten) | 7 |
| Europe (European Hot 100 Singles) | 20 |
| France (SNEP) | 110 |
| Germany (GfK) | 52 |
| Hungary (Single Top 40) | 28 |
| Ireland (IRMA) | 16 |
| Italy Airplay (EarOne) | 6 |
| New Zealand Airplay (Recorded Music NZ) | 50 |
| Scottish Singles Sales (Official Charts) | 6 |
| Switzerland (Schweizer Hitparade) | 49 |
| UK Singles (Official Charts) | 5 |
| US Adult Alternative Airplay (Billboard) | 21 |
| US Alternative Airplay (Billboard) | 34 |
| US Hot Rock & Alternative Songs (Billboard) | 42 |

| Chart (2026) | Peak position |
|---|---|
| Portugal Airplay (AFP) | 98 |

==== Year-end charts ====
| Chart (2009) | Position |
|---|---|
| UK Singles (OCC) | 95 |

| Chart (2010) | Position |
|---|---|
| Australia (ARIA) | 63 |
| Italy Airplay (EarOne) | 31 |
| UK Singles (OCC) | 59 |

| Chart (2025) | Position |
|---|---|
| Belgium (Ultratop 50 Flanders) | 196 |

=== Certifications ===
Certifications for "You've Got the Love"
| Region | Certification | Certified units/sales |
|---|---|---|
| Australia (ARIA) | 7× Platinum | 490,000^{‡} |
| Brazil (Pro-Música Brasil) | Gold | 30,000^{‡} |
| Denmark (IFPI Danmark) | Gold | 45,000^{‡} |
| Germany (BVMI) | Gold | 150,000^{‡} |
| Italy (FIMI) | Platinum | 50,000^{‡} |
| New Zealand (RMNZ) | 5× Platinum | 150,000^{‡} |
| Spain (Promusicae) | Platinum | 60,000^{‡} |
| United Kingdom (BPI) | 6× Platinum | 3,600,000^{‡} |
| United States (RIAA) | Platinum | 1,000,000^{‡} |
^{‡} Sales+streaming figures based on certification alone.

== "You Got the Dirtee Love" ==
"You Got the Dirtee Love"

Single by Florence + the Machine and Dizzee Rascal

from the album Between Two Lungs and Tongue n' Cheek (Dirtee Deluxe Edition)
- Released: 17 February 2010
- Length: 3:38
- Label: Island
- Songwriters: John P. Jr. Bellamy; Anthony Stephens; Arnecia Michelle Harris; Nicholas Denton; Dylan Mills
- Producers: Charlie Hugall; Nicholas Denton

Florence and the Machine singles chronology
| "You've Got the Love" (2009) | "You Got the Dirtee Love" (2010) | "Cosmic Love" (2010) |

Dizzee Rascal singles chronology
| "Dirtee Cash" (2009) | "You Got the Dirtee Love" (2010) | "Dirtee Disco" (2010) |

At the 2010 BRIT Awards on 16 February 2010, Florence and the Machine and Dizzee Rascal performed a mashup of "You Got the Love" and Dizzee's song "Dirtee Cash", entitled "You Got the Dirtee Love".

The single was released on 17 February 2010 exclusively to iTunes, one day after the BRITs performance. On 21 February 2010, the single entered the UK Singles Chart at number two. As of May 2010, the single had sold more than 280,000 copies in the UK. "You Got the Dirtee Love" is featured on the Dirtee Deluxe Edition of Dizzee Rascal's Tongue n' Cheek album; the track charted in Ireland and Australia following the album's release. It also appears on the Between Two Lungs reissue of Florence and the Machine's album Lungs.

The song was performed at Radio 1's Big Weekend in North Wales on 22 May 2010, and again at the Glastonbury Festival 2010 on 25 June. The song was also performed at Capital's Summertime Ball 2010, where Florence Welch appeared as a special guest during Dizzee's set.

=== Charts ===
==== Weekly charts ====
| Chart (2010) | Peak position |
|---|---|
| Australia (ARIA) | 27 |
| Ireland (IRMA) | 24 |
| Europe (European Hot 100 Singles) | 8 |
| UK Singles (Official Charts) | 2 |

==== Year-end charts ====
| Chart (2010) | Position |
|---|---|
| UK Singles (OCC) | 54 |

=== Certifications ===
| Region | Certification | Certified units/sales |
|---|---|---|
| Australia (ARIA) | Gold | 35,000^{^} |
| United Kingdom (BPI) | Platinum | 600,000^{‡} |
^{^} Shipments figures based on certification alone.^{‡} Sales+streaming figures based on certification alone.

== Other versions ==
The song was covered by English singer and songwriter Joss Stone for her fourth studio album, Colour Me Free!, released in October 2008. Sam Ryder released a cover version as a single in 2023. Kasabian played the track live at festivals, and in 2008 were nominated UK Festival Awards in the category "Most Memorable Moment" for their cover of the song at Creamfields.
