= No More Tears (Enough Is Enough) =

1979 single by Barbra Streisand and Donna Summer

- US vinyl picture sleeve

Single by Barbra Streisand and Donna Summer

from the album Wet and On the Radio: Greatest Hits Volumes I & II
- B-side: "Wet" (Columbia); "Lucky" or "My Baby Understands" (Casablanca)
- Released: October 1979
- Recorded: 14–28 August 1979
- Studio: Village Recorder, Los Angeles
- Genre: Disco; soul
- Length: 4:39 (Columbia radio edit); 4:48 (Casablanca radio edit); 8:19 (Wet album version); 11:43 (On the Radio/12" version)
- Label: Columbia; Casablanca
- Songwriters: Paul Jabara; Bruce Roberts
- Producers: Gary Klein; Giorgio Moroder; Harold Faltermeyer (Summer 12" version)

Barbra Streisand singles chronology
"The Main Event/Fight" (1979)	"No More Tears (Enough Is Enough)" (1979)	"Kiss Me in the Rain" (1979)

Donna Summer singles chronology
"Dim All the Lights" (1979)	"No More Tears (Enough Is Enough)" (1979)	"On the Radio" (1980)

"No More Tears (Enough Is Enough)" is a song recorded by American singers Barbra Streisand and Donna Summer, released in October 1979. It was written by Paul Jabara and Bruce Roberts, and produced by Gary Klein and Giorgio Moroder. The song was recorded for Streisand's album Wet (1979) and also as a new track for Summer's compilation double album On the Radio: Greatest Hits Volumes I & II (1979). The full-length version was found on Streisand's album, while a longer 11-minute edit (the 12" version) was featured on Summer's album. The longer 12" version features additional production by frequent collaborator Harold Faltermeyer, and incorporates a harder rock edge.

== Release ==
The single was released on both Casablanca Records (Summer's label) and Columbia Records (Streisand's label) and sales of the two were amalgamated. The versions on the two 7" singles differed slightly however, with different mixes and slightly different background vocal arrangements. The formats differed between nations—in the US for example, the song was only released on 7" by Columbia, and 12" (the extended version from the On The Radio album) by Casablanca.

Although the sales of the two labels' releases were amalgamated, both the 7" and the 12" were certified Gold by the RIAA in early 1980. The 7" single was eventually certified Platinum, signifying sales of two million US copies.

Bowing on the Hot 100 at number 59 on 20 October 1979, the single went to number one on the US Billboard Hot 100 on 24 November – 1 December 1979 (making it the first duet by two women to top the Billboard Hot 100 and becoming both singers' fourth chart-topping single in the US, as well as Summer's final) and number one for four weeks on the disco chart. "No More Tears" was also a big international hit, and made the top three in both Canada and the UK.

The song’s original title was simply "Enough is Enough," which didn’t fit the theme of Streisand’s Wet album, in which every song had something to do with water. So the songwriters changed the title and added the introduction: "It’s raining, it’s pouring, my love life is boring me to tears."

After recording "No More Tears" Summer and Streisand did not perform the song together live, although Summer did sing the song in concert with other female performers, including Tina Arena and Summer's sister Mary Gaines Bernard. Streisand included the song as part of her 2012 Barbra Live concert tour (released as Back to Brooklyn), where she discussed Summer's recent passing and how she wished Summer were alive so they could sing the song together.

A later remix released as "Enough Is Enough 2017" climbed to #3 on the US Dance Club chart.

== Personnel ==
- Barbra Streisand and Donna Summer – vocals
- Greg Mathieson – acoustic and electric piano
- Neil Stubenhaus – bass
- James Gadson – drums
- Jay Graydon and Jeff Baxter – guitar
- Julia Waters, Maxine Waters, Luther Waters – background vocals

=== Production credits ===
- Produced by Gary Klein for The Entertainment Company in association with Giorgio Moroder Productions
- Music Contractor Frank DeCaro
- Arranged and Conducted by Greg Mathieson
- Vocals arranged by Bruce Roberts, Paul Jabara and Luther Waters
- Engineered by Juergen Koppers and John Arrias
- Recorded at Village Recorders and Rusk Sound Studios, Los Angeles

== Charts ==
=== Weekly charts ===
Weekly chart performance for "No More Tears (Enough Is Enough)"
Chart (1979–1980)	Peak position
Australia (Kent Music Report)	8
Austria (Ö3 Austria Top 40)	16
Belgium (Ultratop 50 Flanders)	16
Canada Top Singles (RPM)	2
Canada Adult Contemporary (RPM)	6
Canada Dance/Urban (RPM)	1
Finland (Suomen virallinen lista)	6
France (SNEP)	13
Ireland (IRMA)	7
Italy (Musica e dischi)	6
Japan (Oricon)	59
Netherlands (Dutch Top 40)	20
Netherlands (Single Top 100)	27
New Zealand (Recorded Music NZ)	7
Norway (VG-lista)	3
Portugal (Musica & Som)	4
Spain (AFE)	2
Spain Airplay (Los 40)	4
Sweden (Sverigetopplistan)	1
Switzerland (Schweizer Hitparade)	11
UK Singles (Official Charts)	3
US Billboard Hot 100	1
US Adult Contemporary (Billboard)	7
US Dance Club Songs (Billboard)	1
US Cash Box Top 100	1
West Germany (GfK)	31

Weekly chart performance for "Enough Is Enough 2017"
Chart (2017)	Peak position
US Dance Club Songs (Billboard)	3
US Dance/Electronic Songs (Billboard)	39

=== Year-end charts ===
1979 year-end chart performance for "No More Tears (Enough Is Enough)"
Chart (1979)	Position
Australia (Kent Music Report)	93
Canada Top Singles (RPM)	101
UK Singles (OCC)	69
US Cash Box Top 100	25

1980 year-end chart performance for "No More Tears (Enough Is Enough)"
Chart (1980)	Position
Australia (Kent Music Report)	81
US Billboard Hot 100	38

== Certifications and sales ==
Certifications for "No More Tears (Enough Is Enough)"
Region	Certification	Certified units/sales
Argentina	—	150,000
Canada (Music Canada)	Gold	75,000^{^}
Japan	—	31,000
Japan 12"	—	23,000
United Kingdom (BPI)	Silver	250,000^{^}
United States (RIAA) 7"	Platinum	1,000,000^{^}
United States (RIAA) 12"	Gold	1,000,000^{^}
^{^} Shipments figures based on certification alone.

== Parodies ==
Comedian Eddie Murphy recorded a parody version of the song as it might be performed by exercise guru Richard Simmons and Our Gang actor Billie "Buckwheat" Thomas. The song appears on Murphy's 1982 self-titled comedy album.

On the UPN's series Half & Half, the song was performed in an episode by Phyllis (Telma Hopkins) and Big Dee Dee (Valarie Pettiford).

== Sampling ==
- In 2008, Serbian pop-folk singer Jelena Karleuša used the 'enough is enough' line on her album JK Revolution. It can be heard in the song "Mala (TeatroMix)".
- An interpretation of "No More Tears" begins "Rainy Dayz" by Raekwon and Ghostface Killah.

== Kym Mazelle & Jocelyn Brown version ==
"No More Tears (Enough Is Enough)"

Single by Kym Mazelle and Jocelyn Brown
- B-side: "One More Time"
- Released: 9 May 1994
- Studio: Comforts Place
- Genre: Disco; Eurodance; hi-NRG
- Length: 4:56 (short intro); 5:56 (full intro)
- Label: Arista
- Songwriters: Paul Jabara; Bruce Roberts
- Producers: Mike Stock; Matt Aitken

Kym Mazelle singles chronology
"Love Me the Right Way" (1993)	"No More Tears (Enough Is Enough)" (1994)	"Young Hearts Run Free" (1996)

Jocelyn Brown singles chronology
"Don't Talk Just Kiss" (1991)	"No More Tears (Enough Is Enough)" (1994)	"Keep on Jumpin'" (1996)

Music video
- "No More Tears (Enough Is Enough)" on YouTube

In 1994, American singers Kym Mazelle and Jocelyn Brown released a cover of "No More Tears (Enough Is Enough)". The song was produced by Mike Stock and Matt Aitken, and peaked at number 13 in its second week at the UK Singles Chart, on 12 June. It also charted in Australia, Belgium and Ireland, where it reached number 19. The single, released by Arista Records on 9 May 1994, marked the first collaboration between producers Mike Stock and Matt Aitken since the split of the famous '80s production triumvirate with Pete Waterman. The idea to record the Streisand/Summer song came from the head of the Bell label Simon Cowell. Stock told in a 1994 interview, "The idea was to make something more camp and outrageous than k.d. lang and Andy Bell's recent version, which we found a bit drippy." "No More Tears (Enough Is Enough)" was also picked up by RCA Records in July 1994 for release in the US.

=== Critical reception ===
Billboard magazine commented, "All we have to say is that we would have paid any price to have witnessed the recording session for the Kym Mazelle/Jocelyn Brown duet 'No More Tears'. No doubt it was the diva fest to end them all—not to mention true history in the making. Only a pair with the vocal seasoning of these dance music legends could take on the Barbra Streisand/Donna Summer classic and make it work so well. The original version of the track was produced with a giddy hi-NRG attitude by Stock & Aitken". The magazine also remarked that Mazelle and Brown's vocals "have proper degrees of sass, drama, and grit." Robbert Tilli from Music & Media stated, "This remake is likely to be as big as a gay anthem as its forerunner was." Alan Jones from Music Week gave it a score of four out of five, adding that when "these two mighty big mouths join together for a revamp" of the Streisand/Summer hit, "it will, of course, be a big hit." James Hamilton from the Record Mirror Dance Update named it a "Hi-NRG tempoed but cheesy" track in his weekly dance column.

=== Music video ===
A music video was produced to promote the single, directed by Max Giwa & Dani Pasquini, known as just Max & Dani. It was released on 30 May and features camp theatrics that collide in a beauty salon.

=== Track listing ===
- CD single, UK (1994)
1. "No More Tears (Enough Is Enough)" (radio edit) (short intro) – 4:56
2. "No More Tears (Enough Is Enough)" (radio edit) (full intro) – 5:56
3. "No More Tears (Enough Is Enough)" (classic disco mix by Evolution) – 7:39
4. "One More Time" – 4:14

=== Charts ===
==== Weekly charts ====
Chart (1994)	Peak position
Australia (ARIA)	48
Belgium (Ultratop 50 Flanders)	46
Europe (Eurochart Hot 100)	41
Europe (European Dance Radio)	12
Ireland (IRMA)	19
Israel (Israeli Singles Chart)	12
Netherlands (Dutch Top 40 Tipparade)	11
Netherlands (Dutch Single Tip)	3
Scottish Singles Sales (Official Charts)	23
UK Singles (Official Charts)	13
UK Airplay (Music Week)	39
UK Dance Singles (Music Week)	5
UK Club Chart (Music Week)	16

==== Year-end charts ====
Chart (1994)	Position
UK Singles (OCC)	141

== Amber and Zelma Davis version (2008) ==
"No More Tears (Enough Is Enough)"

Single by Amber and Zelma Davis
- Released: 12 August 2008
- Genre: Dance-pop
- Label: JMCA
- Songwriters: Paul Jabara; Bruce Roberts

Amber singles chronology
"This Is Your Night [re-recorded]" (2008)	"No More Tears (Enough Is Enough)" (2008)	"I Don't Believe in Hate (Drip Drop)" (2009)

Music video
- "No More Tears (Enough Is Enough)" on YouTube

On 12 August 2008, JMCA issued the 7-track digital EP No More Tears (Enough Is Enough) by Dutch singer Amber and American singer Zelma Davis (formerly of C+C Music Factory). This version, which features modern remixes for today's dance clubs, includes a vocal showdown between the two artists that builds to a dramatic conclusion. The album cover is an homage to the original release by Donna Summer and Barbra Streisand.

=== Track listing ===
No.	Title	Length
1.	"No More Tears (Enough Is Enough)" (Pathos V2 classic mix)	5:14
2.	"No More Tears (Enough Is Enough)" (Pathos V2 Kick Out radio edit)	3:51
3.	"No More Tears (Enough Is Enough)" (Pathos V2 Kick Out radio edit)	5:13
4.	"No More Tears (Enough Is Enough)" (Solar City radio edit)	3:55
5.	"No More Tears (Enough Is Enough)" (Solar City album edit)	5:15
6.	"No More Tears (Enough Is Enough)" (Solar City Epic mix)	6:41
7.	"No More Tears (Enough Is Enough)" (Solar City Epic club mix)	10:50
