= Laughing Pizza =

American pop band

- Origin: Atlanta, Georgia
- Genres: Pop, children's
- Years active: 2001–2015
- Labels: Epic; Sony Wonder; Little Bean
- Award: Parents' Choice Award
- Past members: Lisa Michaelis; Billy Schlosser; Emily Schlosser

Laughing Pizza was an American family band that wrote and performed pop music for children, based in Atlanta, Georgia. It was a trio consisting of Lisa Michaelis, Billy Schlosser, and their daughter Emily. They were best known for their G-rated music videos. which were played on PBS stations for nearly eight years. Their most popular songs included "Breakfast Jive" and "Share a Smile", which involved spelling out the word "SMILE" with arm motions, recalling the Village People's "YMCA".

The band toured across the United States in their minivan, the Pizza Mobile, and performed at the White House twice, including once with Miley Cyrus and the Jonas Brothers. Although they signed a multi-year deal with Epic Records and Sony Wonder in 2006, they ended up releasing their five CDs and two DVDs under their own label, Little Bean Entertainment. By 2011, the band had won six Parents' Choice Awards. In 2012, they released their first film, Laughing Pizza: The Concert Movie.

== Background ==
Originally from New York, songwriters Lisa Michaelis and Billy Schlosser were both involved in the music business from a young age, performing together in a band on Star Search. Michaelis was the vocalist on Frankie Knuckles' "Rainfalls", a Billboard No. 1 dance track in 1992. Schlosser worked with Steely Dan for ten years and managed a recording studio in New York. They also wrote songs for Mary-Kate and Ashley Olsen, including "At the End of the Day".

They came up with the idea of starting Laughing Pizza after the events of September 11, 2001, when Schlosser was stranded in Boston for a week on a business trip and separated from his family, who lived in Atlanta. Michaelis said that as parents, they had been taken aback when their five-year-old daughter started singing Britney Spears' "I'm a Slave 4 U", and decided there was a need for family-friendly pop music.

All three members of Laughing Pizza were involved in songwriting. Their daughter Emily played multiple instruments including the piano, drums, guitar, bass, and flute.

== Projects ==
Laughing Pizza started out producing its own music in its home studio, Little Bean Records, in Smyrna, Georgia. By 2006, the band had self-released two CDs and two DVDs, when they signed a multi-year deal with Epic Records and Sony Wonder.

Six months after the deal was signed, Sony Wonder folded and Laughing Pizza was left on a rock label with Good Charlotte, J-Lo, Shakira, Sean Kingston, and Celine Dion. Both parties decided to end contract in 2008 so that Laughing Pizza could continue under their kids' label, which was re-named Little Bean. The next year was spent performing, writing, and working to get their music videos onto many PBS stations nationwide including GPB (all of Georgia); Columbus, OH; New York, San Diego, CA; Idaho; Louisiana; and Philadelphia, PA.

The family trio traveled across the United States performing at theaters, museums, music festivals, nightclubs, schools, and other venues. Laughing Pizza has also been featured on the Today Show, CNN, and Fox stations, as well as in Money Magazine,[1] The New York Times, Atlanta Magazine, Star Magazine, and the Huffington Post, among others. They were recipients of seven Parents' Choice Awards, and their new one-hour docu-concert, "Laughing Pizza LIVE" had won a NAPPA award, as well as a 5/5 rating from The Dove Foundation and rave reviews from the Parents' Television Council.

Their song "On My Way" was chosen by Julie Andrews and her daughter Emma Walton Hamilton (who co-wrote the lyrics) to be featured in the book "Julie Andrews Collection of Songs, Poems, and Lullabies" (Little/Brown).

In 2011, Laughing Pizza filmed a one-hour concert, which was made to be a TV special and aired as a pledge special in June 2012 on PBS. It got one of the highest ratings ever recorded for the family portion of Pledge – second only to Sesame Street. Shot at the Scholastic Theatre in New York City, the band was joined by hosts, celebrity Chef Todd English and his teenage son, Simon. The show also featured dancers from the kid and teen program at the Broadway Dance Center and a string trio from Juilliard.

In 2012, Michaelis was diagnosed with ovarian cancer and died on November 29, 2015.

== Music ==
Laughing Pizza's CDs include:

- Meet the Pizzas
- Pizza Party!
- Let's Go Play!
- Holidays: Songs for the Whole Year

The band's DVDs include:

- Feelin' Good
- Share a Smile!
- It's Pizza Time!

Emily drew the pictures on the covers of some of their CDs and DVDs.
