= David Crawford =

David Crawford may refer to:

== People ==
- David L. Crawford (1889–1974), American football and basketball coach
- Dave Crawford (musician) (1943–1988), American musician, songwriter and record producer
- David Crawford (astronomer) (1931–2024), American astronomer, winner of the 2010 Clifford W. Holmes Award for popularizing astronomy
- David Crawford (Australian footballer) (born 1983), Australian rules footballer
- David Crawford (businessman), Australian non-executive director
- David Crawford (colonel) (c. 1625–1710), member of the House of Burgesses and plantation owner in Virginia
- David Crawford (diplomat) (1928–1981), British ambassador to Qatar and to Bahrain
- David Crawford (footballer, born 1873) (1873–1937), Scottish international footballer for St Mirren and Rangers
- David Crawford (footballer, born 1985), Scottish footballer for Partick Thistle
- David Crawford (footballer, born 1992), Scottish footballer for Hibernian
- David Crawford (historian) (1665–1726), Scottish Historiographer Royal
- David Crawford, American actor who played David Robinson in the 1962 film To Kill a Mockingbird

== Places ==
- David Crawford House, Newburgh, New York, USA, which houses a collection of historical artifacts from a shipping merchant
