= House of Love (Candi Staton album) =

Studio album by Candi Staton
- Released: 1978
- Studio: Sound City Studios
- Genre: Soul
- Label: Warner Bros.
- Producer: Dave Crawford

Candi Staton chronology
| Music Speaks Louder than Words (1977) | House of Love (1978) | Chance (1979) |

House of Love is an album by American singer Candi Staton released in 1978 on Warner Bros. Records. The album peaked at No. 19 on the US Billboard Top R&B Albums chart.

== Critical reception ==
Professional ratings
Review scores
| Source | Rating |
|---|---|
| AllMusic | 2/5 stars |

AllMusic rated the album 2-out-of-5 stars.

== Track listing ==
| No. | Title | Writer(s) | Length |
|---|---|---|---|
| 1. | "Victim" | Dave Crawford | 8:32 |
| 2. | "Honest I Do Love You" | Crawford | 5:53 |
| 3. | "Yesterday Evening" | Sylvester Rivers | 3:46 |
| 4. | "I Wonder Will I Ever Get Over It" | Crawford | 6:31 |
| 5. | "I'm Gonna Make You Love Me" | Kenny Gamble, Jerry Ross, Jerry Williams | 3:53 |
| 6. | "So Blue" | Crawford | 5:19 |
| 7. | "Take My Hand, Precious Lord" | Rev. Thomas A. Dorsey | 4:29 |
