= Mary Gaines Bernard =

American singer

Mary Gaines Bernard is an American singer best known for her work with her sister, Donna Summer.

== Biography ==
Bernard was born in Boston, Massachusetts, and her parents, Andrew and Mary Gaines, raised their 6 children as devout Christians.

The family worshiped at Boston's Grant African Methodist Episcopal Church, and it was here that their love of music was nurtured.

In the late 1960s, Bernard's sister, Donna, was offered a role in the European cast of the hit musical, Hair. Donna returned to the United States in late 1975 as her song, Love to Love You Baby, was climbing the charts. Donna's first headlining tour was in 1976, and Mary along with sister Dara joined Donna's band as back-up singers. Gaines marriage to Gerardo Bernard which produced 5 children, most notably famed romance novelist Gerardo LTD Bernard; writer of Falling from Grace or his widely popular children series. Bernard remains as one of Summer's back-up singers, and is most known to fans for the duet she sings with Donna on the hit record, No More Tears (Enough is Enough).

In 1978 Bernard, along with sister Dara, and Carlena Williams formed the short lived group, Sunshine. They have a song (Take It To The Zoo) featured on the soundtrack to the movie, Thank God It's Friday, and they worked on songs for an album titled Watch'n Daddy Dance. This album was never released.→

The three singers continued to tour with Summer through her 1981 tour, and Mary along with Dara toured with their sister through 1987. After 1989 Mary continued to tour with her sister often joined by her brother-in-law, Bruce Sudano, Yvonne Hodges and other back-up vocalists. This continued until Donna Summer died from cancer in May, 2012.

Currently, Bernard works with the music ministry at Calvary Chapel Fort Lauderdale . She has also released her first solo recording, [You Made It], which features contemporary Gospel songs. In 2007, she recorded a Christmas song, Make December Stay, that has been featured on YouTube. It was announced that she will stage a tribute concert in honor of her late sister on December 31, 2015, in Delray Beach, Florida.

== Published works ==
=== Discography ===
As Sunshine:

- Take It To The Zoo, track from Thank God It's Friday, Original Soundtrack album, 1978, Casablanca Records.
- Live and More, Live and studio album from Donna Summer, 1978, Casablanca Records.

=== Filmography ===
As Mary Bernard:

- A&E Biography, Donna Summer, 1994.
- A Hot Summer Night With Donna, concert video and DVD, 1983, Polygram Records.
- VH1 Presents, Donna Summer, Live and More, Encore!, concert video, DVD, and audio recording, 1999, Sony Records.
- VH1 Behind The Music, Donna Summer, 1999.
- WE Network, Intimate Portrait, Donna Summer, 2003.
