= The Midnite Hour =

Studio album by Jamie Principle
- Released: January 2, 1992; November 19, 2012 (reissue)
- Recorded: 1991
- Genre: House music, dance, soul
- Length: 47:53
- Label: Smash/PolyGram Records
- Producer: Steve "Silk" Hurley; Jamie Principle

Professional ratings
Review scores
Source	Rating
Allmusic	3.5/5 stars

The Midnite Hour is a dance album by American house artist Jamie Principle, released in January 1992 on the label Smash Records. The album is a mixture of electronic, dance and soul music, produced by Steve "Silk" Hurley and Jamie Principle. The album was reissued in November 2012 by Island Records.

== Track listing ==
No.	Title	Writer(s)	Length
1.	"Private Joy"	Jamie Principle	5:08
2.	"Hot Body"	Principle, Steve "Silk" Hurley	3:55
3.	"You're All I've Waited 4"	Principle, Hurley	4:15
4.	"Do It"	Manny Moore, Mark Williams	4:30
5.	"Sexuality"	Principle	4:32
6.	"Taste My Love"	Principle, Hurley, Eric Miller, Maurice Joshua	4:55
7.	"Please Don't Go Away"	Hurley, Manny Mohr	5:23
8.	"The Midnight Hour"	Principle	5:59
9.	"I've Cried All My Tears"	Principle	5:51
10.	"If It's Love"	Principle	5:15

== Personnel ==
Credits taken from album liner notes

- Arranged By, Engineer – Steve "Silk" Hurley
- Lead Vocals, Backing Vocals, Written-By, Producer, Arranged By, Engineer – Jamie Principle
- Backing vocals [additional] Kim Sims (track:6), Dave Jackson, Manny Mohr, Martell Stewart (track: 7), Chantay Savage, Donell Rush (track: 8)
- Drum Programming – Jamie Principle (tracks: 1, 2, 9, 10), Steve "Silk" Hurley (tracks: 1 to 4, 6 to 8)
- Engineer – Eric Miller, Larry Sturm
- Keyboards – Jamie Principle (tracks: 1 to 4, 8 to 10), Steve "Silk" Hurley (tracks: 1 to 4, 6 to 8, 10), Eric Miller (track: 5)
- Executive Producer – Connie Varvitsiotis, Frank Rodrigo
- Producer, Mixed By – Steve "Silk" Hurley (tracks: 1 to 4, 6 to 10)
- Written-By – Steve "Silk" Hurley (tracks: 2 to 4, 6, 7)
