= Young Hearts Run Free (album) =

Studio album by Candi Staton
- Released: 1976
- Genres: Soul, Disco
- Length: 35:08
- Label: Warner Bros. Records
- Producer: David Crawford

Candi Staton chronology
Candi (1974)	Young Hearts Run Free (1976)	Music Speaks Louder Than Words (1977)

Young Hearts Run Free is an album by American singer Candi Staton released in 1976 on Warner Bros. Records. The album peaked at No. 14 on the US R&B Album chart and No. 129 on the Billboard 200.

== Critical reception ==
Record World in their June 1976 "Album Picks" review described the album as evidence of an "entirely new and vibrant career" for Staton and specifically praised the potential of "Run to Me", "I Know" and "Destiny". Rolling Stone similarly emphasized Staton's vocal performance. The review described the album as a dreamy exploration of love and praised Staton for singing with exceptional intensity throughout the record.

== Track listing ==
No.	Title	Writer(s)	Length
1.	"Run to Me"	Dave Crawford	4:18
2.	"Destiny"	Dave Crawford	3:54
3.	"What a Feeling"	Dave Crawford	4:35
4.	"You Bet Your Sweet, Sweet Love"	Kenny O'Dell	4:38
5.	"Young Hearts Run Free"	Dave Crawford	4:08
6.	"Living for You"	Al Green / Willie Mitchell	4:48
7.	"Summer Time with You"	Ollie E. Brown	5:00
8.	"I Know"	Dave Crawford	3:50
Total length:			35:08
