= Cold World (Steve "Silk" Hurley song) =

1989 single by Steve "Silk" Hurley, featuring Jamie Principle

Single by Steve "Silk" Hurley featuring Jamie Principle

from the album Work It Out Compilation
- B-side: Remix; "Chain Of Fools" feat. Risse
- Released: 1989
- Recorded: 1989
- Genre: Chicago house
- Length: 4:30
- Label: Atlantic
- Songwriter(s): Jamie Principle
- Producer(s): Steve "Silk" Hurley; Jamie Principle; Frank Rodrigo

Steve "Silk" Hurley singles chronology
"Chain of Fools" (1989)	"Cold World" (1989)	"Seasons of Love" (1991)

Alternative cover

"Cold World" is a song recorded by Steve "Silk" Hurley along with Jamie Principle.

The single was released as the second single from the Hurley's compilation Work It Out on Atlantic Records in 1989, and it charted at number twenty-two on the U.S. Billboard Hot Dance Music/Club Play chart.

== Credits and personnel ==
- Steve Hurley - producer, mix
- Jamie Principle - writer, featuring vocal, producer, engineer
- Frank Rodrigo - executive producer, engineer
- Larry Sturm - engineer

== Official versions ==
- "Cold World (LP Version)" - 5:30
- "Cold World (Extended Mix)" - 5:56
- "Cold World (Funky Acid Mix)" - 4:50
- "Cold World (Radio Edit)" - 4:33
- "Cold World (Funky Radio Edit)" - 4:30
- "Cold World (Funky Cold Mix) - 5:54
- "Cold World (Mommy Can You Hear Me Mix) - 6:35
- "Cold World (Children's Mix) - 4:44

== Charts and sales ==
=== Peak positions ===
Chart (1989)	Peak position
U.S. Billboard Hot Dance Music/Club Play	22

== See also ==
- List of artists who reached number one on the US Dance chart
