= Love Me the Right Way =

Single by Rapination featuring Kym Mazelle
- Released: 1992
- Genre: Italo-house; techno
- Length: 3:25
- Label: Arista; Logic Records; RCA
- Songwriters: The Rapino Brothers; Kym Mazelle
- Producer: The Rapino Brothers

Kym Mazelle singles chronology
"No One Can Love You More Than Me" (1991)	"Love Me the Right Way" (1992)	"No More Tears (Enough Is Enough)" (1994)

Music video
- "Love Me the Right Way" on YouTube

"Love Me the Right Way" is a song by Italian record producers Charlie Mallozzi and Marco Sabiu as Rapination. It features vocals by American singer-songwriter Kym Mazelle, who also is credited for co-writing the song. Released in 1992 by Arista, Logic and RCA Records, it peaked at number 22 in the UK, and also charted in Finland, Ireland and Sweden. In 1996, a new remix of the song was released, reaching number 20 on the US Billboard Hot Dance Club Play chart as well as number 15 on the UK Dance Singles Chart.

== Critical reception ==
Larry Flick from Billboard magazine wrote, "Any opportunity to feast on the vocal prowess of Mazelle is well worth taking—even when the track she is given doesn't quite match her talent. The Rapino Brothers concoct a pleasing, but familiar Italo-house groove that benefits from the use of techno-influenced synth bits. A hit overseas, U.S. spinners may find the "Angelino Ambiento" mix intriguing." Simon Price from Melody Maker said, "The Rapination record is just STACKED. I swear, at one point, I hear the formidable lungs of Kym Mazelle ask, How can I make you rub me the right way?"

== Track listing ==
- 7" single, UK (1992)

A. "Love Me the Right Way" (Gee & Professor 7" Mix) — 3:25
B. "Love Me the Right Way" (Gee & Professor Instrumental) — 3:25

- 12", US (1992)

A1. "Love Me the Right Way" (The Real Rapino 12" Mix) — 5:48
A2. "Love Me the Right Way" (The Angelino Ambient Mix) — 5:19
A3. "Love Me the Right Way" (Gee And The Professor 7" Edit) — 3:25
B1. "Love Me the Right Way" (Angelino Tekniko Mix) — 4:43
B2. "Love Me the Right Way" (Happy Larry's Mix) — 5:29
B3. "Love Me the Right Way" (Lorenzo Mix) — 5:00

- 12" maxi, Netherlands (1992)

A. "Love Me the Right Way" (The Real Rapino 12" Mix) — 5:48
B1. "Love Me the Right Way" (Angelino's Tekniko Mix) — 4:43
B2. "Love Me the Right Way" (Gee And The Professor 7" Mix) — 3:25

- CD single, UK & Europe (1992)
1. "Love Me the Right Way" (Gee And Professor 7" Mix) — 3:25
2. "Love Me the Right Way" (The Real Rapino 12" Mix) — 5:48
3. "Love Me the Right Way" (Angelino's Tekniko Mix) — 4:43
4. "Love Me the Right Way" (The Angelino Ambiento Mix) — 4:50
- CD single, UK (1996)
1. "Love Me the Right Way" (The Re Rapinoed Radio Edit) — 2:42
2. "Love Me the Right Way" (D.T.'s International Radio Edit) — 3:30
3. "Love Me the Right Way" (The Re Rapinoed Mix) — 5:25
4. "Love Me the Right Way" (D.T.'s International Mix) — 8:58
5. "Love Me the Right Way" (Kama's Love Mix) — 8:01
6. "Love Me the Right Way" (Alex Neri Up & Down Mix) — 8:32

== Charts ==
=== Weekly charts ===
Chart (1992–1993)	Peak position
Europe (Eurochart Hot 100)	73
Europe (European Dance Radio)	3
Finland (IFPI)	37
Ireland (IRMA)	22
Israel (Israeli Singles Chart)	21
Sweden (Sverigetopplistan)	28
UK Singles (OCC)	22
UK Airplay (Music Week)	16
UK Dance (Music Week)	7
UK Club Chart (Music Week)	27
US Maxi-Singles Sales (Billboard)	20

Chart (1996)	Peak position
Scotland (OCC)	61
UK Singles (OCC)	55
UK Dance (OCC)	15
UK Pop Tip Club Chart (Music Week)	5
US Hot Dance Club Play (Billboard)	20

=== Year-end charts ===
Chart (1996)	Position
UK Club Chart (Music Week)	81
