= It's Time! (Candi Staton album) =

Studio album by Candi Staton
- Released: 1995
- Genre: Gospel
- Label: Intersound
- Producer: Marcus Williams

Candi Staton chronology
I Give You Praise (1993)	It's Time! (1995)	Cover Me (1997)

It's Time! is an album by the American singer Candi Staton. It was released in 1995. The album was nominated for a National Association of Independent Recording Distributors and Manufacturers Award, in the "Gospel/religious" category.

"Mama" was a minor hit, and became a popular song to play on Mother's Day. It was named "Song of the Year" for the 1996 National Parents' Day; Staton performed the song for the Clintons at a Parents' Day event.

== Production and promotion ==
The album was produced by Staton's son, Marcus Williams. "Mama" was written by Staton in 1992. Staton promoted the album by appearing on BET's Our Voices Thanksgiving program.

== Critical reception ==
Professional ratings
Review scores
Source	Rating
AllMusic	4/5 stars
The Encyclopedia of Popular Music	3/5 stars
MusicHound R&B: The Essential Album Guide	3/5 stars

The Washington Post wrote that Staton "punctuates the Lord's praises with songs that are firmly rooted in everyday concerns and issues ... there's nearly always a fire burning in Staton's voice when she sings, a tone of unwavering passion and commitment." The Dallas Morning News thought that the album "combines the best elements of [Staton's musical past]: gospel heart, Southern enunciation as sweet and measured as molasses and upbeat disco rhythms." Cash Box called the album "a southern brand of gospel that could get the devil on his feet."

AllMusic noted that "'The Blood' and 'I Want To Grow' express light jazz elements, while 'Rapture Me' is pure funk."

== Track listing ==
No.	Title	Length
1.	"When I See the Blood"
2.	"Mama"
3.	"Somebody's Knocking"
4.	"I'm Changed"
5.	"The Greatest Worship"
6.	"Prelude"
7.	"Born Again"
8.	"You Can Make It"
9.	"He Steps In"
10.	"Rapture"
11.	"I Want to Grow"
12.	"Prelude 'Reprise'"
