= I'm Just a Prisoner =

Studio album by Candi Staton
- Released: 1970
- Genre: Soul
- Label: FAME/Capitol Records

Candi Staton chronology
| I'm Just a Prisoner (1970) | Stand By Your Man (1971) |

I'm Just a Prisoner is the debut album by American singer Candi Staton released in 1970 on Capitol Records. The album peaked at No. 37 on the US Billboard Top R&B Albums chart and No. 28 on the UK Independent Albums chart.

== Critical reception ==
Professional ratings
Review scores
| Source | Rating |
|---|---|
| AllMusic | 3.5/5 stars |

Bill Carpenter of AllMusic, in a 3.5/5-star review, declared "this set embodies the essence of Southern soul — a hybrid of country, R&B and the blues."

== Track listing ==
| No. | Title | Writer(s) | Length |
|---|---|---|---|
| 1. | "Someone You Use" | Clarence Carter, Hope Inglese, Kitty Mann, Tommy Stough | 2:34 |
| 2. | "I'd Rather Be an Old Man's Sweetheart (Than a Young Man's Fool)" | Clarence Carter, George Jackson, Raymond Moore | 2:07 |
| 3. | "You Don't Love Me No More" | Clarence Carter, Candi Staton | 2:22 |
| 4. | "Evidence" | George Jackson, Raymond Moore | 2:39 |
| 5. | "Sweet Feeling" | Clarence Carter, Marcus Daniel, Rick Hall, Candi Staton | 2:44 |
| 6. | "Do Your Duty" | Ronnie Shannon | 2:34 |
| 7. | "That's How Strong My Love Is" | Roosevelt Jamison | 3:28 |
| 8. | "I'm Just a Prisoner (Of Your Good Lovin')" | Eddie Harris, George Jackson | 3:10 |
| 9. | "Another Man's Woman, Another Woman's Man" | Marlin Greene, George Jackson, Dan Penn | 2:32 |
| 10. | "Get It When I Want It" | George Jackson, Raymond Moore | 2:27 |
