= Your Love (Jamie Principle song) =

Single by Jamie Principle
- Released: April 1986
- Genre: Chicago house
- Label: Persona
- Composer: Jamie Principle
- Lyricist: Jamie Principle

Jamie Principle singles chronology
"Waiting on My Angel" (1985)	"Your Love" (1986)

"Your Love" is a 1986 Chicago house song recorded by American artist Jamie Principle. His lyrics, which describe meeting a woman called Lisa, were later given to Frankie Knuckles, a DJ who worked in Chicago clubs Principle frequented. Despite not having produced any original music, Knuckles agreed to work on the song after hearing Principle's original version. Knuckles added more music to the song and played it at his club, generating an enthusiastic reception. His version of the song was played from tapes and is different from later releases; according to Jacob Arnold of Wax Poetics, the edit Knuckles played at his club featured snare drums with vocals. For the first publicly available release, DJ Mark "Hot Rod" Trollan later revised the song, adding a synthesizer intro and a bassline, for a 1986 release from Persona Records.

The song is often credited to Knuckles, despite having first been released by Principle. It was re-released by Trax Records and credited to Knuckles, with Principle being credited as the songwriter. The Trax release and the Persona release are very similar to each other. "Your Love" charted at number 59 in the United Kingdom and in 2014, re-entering the chart after the death of Knuckles, and peaking at number 29.

In 2026, both Principle's original 1986 version and Knuckles' 1987 version were selected by the Library of Congress for preservation in the National Recording Registry for their "cultural, historical or aesthetic importance in the nation's recorded sound heritage."

== Production ==
=== Background ===
"Your Love" was written by a Chicago-based musician Bryan Walton under the alias Jamie Principle. Principle was part of the city's music scene, which mainly revolved around gay and black nightclubs. Principle was not gay and lacked familiarity with gay culture at the time. He took sound engineering classes at college and said his favorite musicians were Prince, David Bowie, Depeche Mode and the Human League.

Frankie Knuckles was originally from New York; he moved to Chicago to work as a club DJ, initially at the Warehouse from 1977 to 1982, then at the Power Plant, which he owned and operated. Principle did not know Knuckles before working with him on "Your Love", but remembered attending the clubs, which he said during the Reagan Era were "a place to escape. You could stay out all night and not worry about what was happening here. When Frankie [Knuckles] had his Power Plant club, it was like going to church and letting yourself be free without worrying about all the craziness that was happening in the streets and in the world."

=== Writing and development ===
Principle, who was working in the finance industry in 1982, created music as a hobby. He said the song's lyrics were developed when he decided to focus less on relationships and more on making music. Principle then meet a woman named Lisa, who became the song's subject. He wrote "Your Love" as a poem about Lisa, before converting it into a song. The original lyrics were sung, uncredited, by Adrienne Jette, whose only credit is for Ron Hardy's "Sensation". Principle's friend Freddy Gomez engineered the song and made a reel-to-reel tape of it. Gomez took the song to Knuckles, whom Principle did not know at the time. Principle said he was "afraid of Frankie, because I heard that if he didn't like the songs, he would just tear them up in front of you". Gomez regularly worked and after taking the song to him without Principle's knowledge, he said Knuckles would get in touch with Principle after listening to it.

Before working with Principle, Knuckles had not produced music and was hesitant to do so. Knuckles found Principle's lyrics are "like books, small books. He would come in with pages and pages and pages of lyrics for one song." Knuckles stated he trimmed the lyrics, believing he was attempting to "thin this out and concentrate on what's sweet about it, what's innocent about it, what's natural about it". Gomez stated Knuckles added a significant amount of material to the song because the original version was about three minutes long. Knuckles said they re-recorded everything with his music partner Eric Kupper. When asked about the song's production, Knuckles said he did not know what he was doing when developing the track. The music was recorded onto a cassette tape.

== Music and additional production ==
"Your Love" has been described as a Chicago house song. In clubs, "Your Love" was played for over a year before it was released in shops. Jacob Arnold of Wax Poetics stated the cassette version that was played in the Power Plant was "little more than a snare march with vocals". For the first public release, DJ Mark "Hot Rod" Trollan, who had remixed work for hire, was brought in to work on the track. Trollan added much material to the song, including its synthesizer intro and a bassline that takes inspiration from an Italo disco track named "Feels Good (Carrots & Beets)" by Electra. Despite there being separate releases credited to both Principle and Knuckles, according to Coleman, the two versions of "Your Love" released by Persona and Trax both begin with an arpeggiated lead followed by a bassline, and outside of "some small differences, all the versions are basically the same".

Some releases of "Your Love" are paired with the song "Baby Wants to Ride", which Principle said is about "spirituality, sexuality, and political views on certain things, like the draft and why I felt like the government wasn't accepting everyone's rights". Principle also said; "I felt like I had to voice that at the time. It was just my own frustration. It was hard for me to be the individual person that I wanted to be." Principle grew up in a strict Christian household and stated the song's sexuality-themed lyrics are about him "dealing with the whole thing of sex before marriage; I was intertwining a lot of personal issues that I had into one song".

== Release ==
The early version of "Your Love" without Trollan's added production was played in clubs from tape for over a year before it was released on vinyl. When the edit was played at Chicago clubs, audiences were generally unaware it was a Chicago-based artist, believing the song originated in Europe.

Through a misunderstanding in the late 1980s over the way the songs were credited and listed commercially, some tracks from this period, including "Your Love", were credited differently in later releases. The song was first released by Persona Records and is credited to Principle, while later releases on Trax Records are credited to Knuckles. Persona Records was created in 1984 and was co-owned by Danny Alias, who met Knuckles at a Chicago release party. Knuckles wanted Alias and his partner David Bell to sign Principle. The label released Principle's first single "Waiting on My Angel" in May 1985.

Principle's version of "Your Love" was first released on a 12" vinyl record in April 1986 by Persona Records, and is solely credited to Jamie Principle. It was the song's third and final release by Persona Records. Alias stated doing business in Chicago led to problems; despite selling many copies of the record, there were issues with "let's just say ...mob control". In 1987, a version credited to Frankie Knuckles was released on Trax Records; Principle received a writing credit for "Your Love" and both of them were credited as songwriters for "Baby Wants to Ride". Principle performed the uncredited vocals on the Knuckles version. In 2014, Principle responded to the Trax release, stating he had "never been signed to Trax! So they literally just stole my stuff."

== Reception and legacy ==
In a contemporaneous review of "Your Love," Brian Chin of Billboard praised Principle's record as a "street record of astonishing accomplishment, one that gets better as it goes along". Chin noted the "lush European feel of the vocal version is counterbalanced by the 11-minute perc-apella mix (by Mark 'Hot Rod' Tollan), totally vocal-less and absorbing".

The release of "Your Love" did not lead to a wave of house music musical imitations; it was not until the release of Jesse Saunders' track "On and On" that more musicians emulated the style. According to Frank Broughton and Bill Brewster, music of this era in Chicago only grew after it demanded a wave of what Broughton described as "simple, repetitive drum tracks" and as people began to realize how basic a track could be while equipment became more affordable, they then began submitting endless tapes to DJs. Marshall Jefferson stated "Your Love" did not inspire anybody to make a similar record; "His shit was too good. It was like seeing John Holmes in a porno movie. You know you can't do better." Principle said when Knuckles played "Your Love" at clubs, he felt the song had been validated by the positive response to it. According to Principle; "it was like God told me, 'This is what you're supposed to be doing.'" Principle and Knuckles went on to collaborate on another 1980s track titled "Bad Boy". In 2014 and 2022, Rolling Stone included "Your Love" in their lists of the "20 Best Chicago House Records" and "200 Greatest Dance Songs of All Time". In 2025, Billboard ranked it number five in their list of "The 100 Best Dance Songs of All Time".

"Your Love" provided background music for the song "You Got the Love" by the Source, who mixed it with a song of the same name by Candi Staton. "You Got the Love" was a hit in the United Kingdom in 1991. Principle agreed to the legal release of a bootleg version of "Your Love" in the UK, but was unaware how popular "You Got the Love" was there. In a 1991 interview, Principle said; "It's number eight in the national chart? You're kidding? Do they play it on the national radio? Is there a video? What does Candi Staton look like?" Following Knuckles' death on March 31, 2014, "Your Love" re-entered the UK Singles Chart at number 29, beating its 1989 peak position of number 59. The "Original bootleg radio mix" of the song appeared in the 2004 British film Layer Cake.

== Track listing ==
Music and lyrics by Jamie Principle.

12" single (JP-222)

1. "Your Love" – 7:48
2. "Your Love (Radio Mix)" – 3:54
3. "Your Love (Dub/Rodapella Mix)" – 11:43

== Certifications ==
Region	Certification	Certified units/sales
United Kingdom (BPI)	Silver	200,000^{‡}
^{‡} Sales+streaming figures based on certification alone.
