= David Crawford (colonel) =

American politician (c. 1625–1710)

Virginia Burgess David Crawford
- Born: 1625; Scotland
- Died: 1710 (aged 84–85); Virginia
- Cause of death: Killed by Pamunkey Indians
- Occupations: Politician, Militia Colonel, Plantation Owner
- Years active: ? - 1710
- Known for: Virginia politics and being the ancestor of Meriwether Lewis.
- Spouse: Jane (Unknown)
- Children: 9
- Relatives: Meriwether Lewis (2nd great-grandson)

Colonel David Crawford (c.1625 – 1710) was a member of the House of Burgesses and an early plantation owner in Virginia.

== Life ==
David Crawford was born circa 1625, in Scotland, emigrating to the Virginia Colony with his father, John Crawford around 1643. His father was later killed in Bacon's Rebellion of 1676.

His daughter Elizabeth (died 1762) married Nicholas Meriwether II of New Kent County, an ancestor of Meriwether Lewis.

Crawford amassed many acres of land and owned a large plantation that eventually became the site of Richmond, Virginia. On April 2, 1692, he was elected to the House of Burgesses as one of two representatives from New Kent County, Virginia, for two years. He introduced a piece of legislation, requiring that county clerks maintain an office in their respective county courthouse.

In 1693 he deeded his 400-acre Assaquin Plantation to his grandson William Meriwether. Four years later he gave his grandson David Meriwether 200 acres of land in St. Paul's Parish.

As an elderly man, he was killed by Pamunkey Indians at Assaquin Plantation, New Kent, Virginia in 1710.
