= Young Hearts Run Free =

1976 single by Candi Staton

- Belgian 7" vinyl single cover

Single by Candi Staton

from the album Young Hearts Run Free
- B-side: "I Know"
- Released: 1976
- Genre: Disco; R&B; soul
- Length: 4:08 (album version); 3:51 (7" version)
- Label: Warner Bros.
- Songwriter: David Crawford
- Producer: David Crawford

Candi Staton singles chronology
"Six Nights and a Day" (1975)	"Young Hearts Run Free" (1976)	"Run to Me" (1976)

Music video
- "Young Hearts Run Free" (1976) on YouTube

Music video
- "Young Hearts Run Free" (1999) on YouTube

"Young Hearts Run Free" is a disco song written by David Crawford and originally recorded by American soul singer Candi Staton in 1976. In 1996, it was covered by American house music singer Kym Mazelle for the triple-platinum selling soundtrack of Romeo + Juliet. In 1999, Staton released a new version which charted in Europe. In 2005, a cover recorded by Gloria Estefan was released for the soundtrack Music from and Inspired by Desperate Housewives.

== Candi Staton version ==
"Young Hearts Run Free" is a disco pop track written and produced by David Crawford. According to Staton, the song's genesis was a conversation she had with Crawford over lunch in Los Angeles: Staton – "Dave Crawford was always asking me: 'What's happening in your life'...and I was [then] with someone I shouldn't have been with and it was hard getting out of that...very abusive relationship" "I [noticed] that [Crawford] was taking notes, and he said, 'You know, I'm gonna write you a song. I'm gonna write you a song that's gonna last forever'".

In the 2024 PBS documentary Disco: Sound of a Revolution, Staton revealed that she wrote the song after her abusive ex-husband threatened to kill her, holding her out over the 20-story balcony of their Las Vegas hotel room. Staton talked him out of it by telling him the hotel was owned by the mafia and he would therefore face repercussions, after which he pulled a gun and threatened to shoot her. He didn’t, and she eventually left the relationship, writing the song about the experience. The song is also referenced in Staton's 1978 single "Victim" in the lyrics, "I became a victim of the very song I sing, I told you 'young hearts run free'. When I didn't listen to myself . . ."

=== Chart performance ===
Released in 1976 from the album of the same title, it spent a week at number one on the US Hot Soul Singles chart. It also peaked at number twenty on the Billboard Hot 100 singles chart. Along with the tracks "Run to Me" and "Destiny", "Young Hearts Run Free" went to number eight on the dance/disco charts. "Young Hearts Run Free" was one of only two songs by Staton to reach the top 10 on the UK Singles Chart, it peaked at number two behind The Real Thing's "You to Me Are Everything". The 1976 single releases had "I Know" on the B-side. In 1999, Staton released a new version of the song, with a new music video to accompany it. This version peaked at number 29 on the UK Singles Chart and became a top-40 hit In Iceland.

=== Critical reception ===
Billboard wrote, "A classic country ballad in a disco leisure suit, as Candi Staton extols the virtues of romantic independence over a soul-stirring horn groove, while simultaneously lamenting that she didn’t practice what she’s preaching in her own relationship." The Guardian said the song "sounds blissful – as if specifically designed to waft out of radios during the sweltering summer of 1976 – but the lyrics are a rueful, downcast cautionary tale of 'lost and lonely' marital discord and years 'filled with tears'." Rolling Stone called it, "still one of the greatest, soaring and melancholy, with Staton's vocal almost unbearably felt".

=== Legacy ===
In June 2019, NME ranked Staton's "Young Hearts Run Free" among "The 20 Best Disco Songs of All Time", writing, "The song became a sort-of letter written by Candi Staton, giving advice to young listeners, and telling them to run from manipulators and abusers." In 2022, Rolling Stone ranked it number 150 in their list of "200 Greatest Dance Songs of All Time", while Billboard magazine ranked it among the "500 Best Pop Songs of All Time" in 2023. In March 2025, Billboard ranked "Young Hearts Run Free" number 44 in their list of "The 100 Best Dance Songs of All Time", noting that "under its warmth and sweetness, Candi Staton’s 1976 disco classic tells a darker tale".

=== Charts ===
Chart (1976)	Peak position
Australia (Kent Music Report)	4
Belgium (Ultratop 50 Flanders)	19
Belgium (Ultratop 50 Wallonia)	38
Canada Top Singles (RPM)	21
New Zealand (Recorded Music NZ)	15
US Billboard Hot 100	20
US Hot Soul Singles (Billboard)	1
US Adult Contemporary (Billboard)	50
UK Singles (OCC)	2

Chart (1986)	Peak position
Ireland (IRMA)	26
UK Singles (OCC)	47

Chart (1999)	Peak position
Europe (Eurochart Hot 100)	91
Iceland (Íslenski Listinn Topp 40)	33
Scotland (OCC)	29
UK Singles (OCC)	29
UK Indie (Official Charts)	6

=== Certifications ===
Region	Certification	Certified units/sales
New Zealand (RMNZ)	2× Platinum	60,000^{‡}
United Kingdom (BPI)	Platinum	600,000^{‡}
United States (RIAA)	Gold	500,000^{‡}
^{‡} Sales+streaming figures based on certification alone.

== Kym Mazelle version ==
"Young Hearts Run Free"

Single by Kym Mazelle

from the album Romeo + Juliet
- Released: January 1997
- Recorded: 1996
- Genre: House
- Length: 3:59
- Label: Capitol
- Songwriter: David Crawford
- Producer: Nellee Hooper

Kym Mazelle singles chronology
"Love Me the Right Way '96" (1996)	"Young Hearts Run Free" (1997)	"Have a Nice Day" (1997)

Music video
- "Young Hearts Run Free" on YouTube

"Young Hearts Run Free" was covered by American house music singer Kym Mazelle and released in 1996 as the second single for the triple-platinum selling soundtrack of Romeo + Juliet by Capitol Records. It was produced by Nellee Hooper. On August 15, 1997, Mazelle performed the song on the UK's Top of the Pops. The single has since become one of Mazelle's signature hits. In 1998, the song was included on the director's remix album Something for Everybody. In December 2005, Mazelle performed a short version of the song during her guest appearance as a contestant on The Weakest Link during the "Rock and Pop Special".

=== Critical reception ===
J.D. Considine from The Baltimore Sun viewed the cover version as a "game but unnecessary remake". A reviewer from Music Week gave it three out of five, noting that here, Nellee Hooper is at the controls for Mazelle's "pumped up version of the soul classic", lifted from the Romeo + Juliet soundtrack." Alan Jackson from The Times commented, "And yet another, with Candi Staton's glorious original subjected to house frenzy." In 2012, Australian music channel Max featured Mazelle's version of "Young Hearts Run Free" in their list of "1000 Greatest Songs of All Time".

=== Music video ===
The music video for "Young Hearts Run Free" features Mazelle in a sleeveless dress wearing gold jewelry as well as a burgundy dress in other scenes. The video was filmed in late 1996. Several scenes and footage from the Romeo + Juliet film appear in the video. The video also features actor Harold Perrineau, who played Mercutio in the film, wearing a white outfit and a platinum blonde afro wig, miming to Mazelle's voice.

=== Track listing ===
- Maxi-single
1. "Young Hearts Run Free" (Album Version) – 3:59
2. "Young Hearts Run Free" (Kiss My Brass – Main Vox Edit) – 3:45
3. "Young Hearts Run Free" (Young Hearts Dub Free - Underground Dub) – 6:10
4. "Young Hearts Run Free" (Kiss My Brass Main Vox) – 8:10

=== Charts ===
Chart (1996–1997)	Peak position
Australia (ARIA)	11
Europe (Eurochart Hot 100)	44
France (SNEP)	29
Germany (GfK)	88
Italy Airplay (Music & Media)	3
New Zealand (Recorded Music NZ)	16
Scotland (OCC)	17
UK Singles (OCC)	20
UK Dance (OCC)	29

=== Certifications ===
Region	Certification	Certified units/sales
Australia (ARIA)	Gold	35,000^{^}
^{^} Shipments figures based on certification alone.
