= Chance (Candi Staton album) =

Studio album by Candi Staton
- Released: 1979
- Studio: Sigma Sound, New York City
- Genre: Soul
- Label: Warner Bros. Records
- Producer: Candi Staton, Jimmy Simpson

Candi Staton chronology
House of Love (1978)	Chance (1979)	Candi Staton (1980)

Professional ratings
Review scores
Source	Rating
Music Week	2/4 stars

Chance is the eighth album by American soul and gospel singer Candi Staton. Singles released from the album included "When You Wake Up Tomorrow" (co-written by Patrick Adams and Wayne K. Garfield), and the title track, which became a top 20 R&B record. The album peaked at No. 23 on the US R&B Album chart and No. 129 on the Billboard 200.

== Track listing ==
Side 1

1. "I Ain’t Got Nowhere to Go" (Ronald Miller, Kenny Lewis, Howard Jennings) – 3:46
2. "When You Wake Up Tomorrow" (Patrick Adams, Ken Morris, Candi Staton, Wayne Garfield) – 6:41
3. "Rock" (Candi Staton, Jimmy Smith) – 7:16

Side 2

1. "Chance" (Candi Staton, Wayne Garfield, Jimmy Smith) – 5:31
2. "I Live" (Nickolas Ashford, Valerie Simpson) – 5:10
3. "Me and My Music" (Patrick Adams, Ken Morris, Candi Staton, Margie Smith) – 5:50

== Musicians ==
- Candi Staton – vocals
- Richard Taninbaum, Christopher Parker, Steve Jordan – drums
- Norbert Sloley, Carol Coleman, Francisco Centeno – bass guitar
- Eddie Colon, Michael Lewis, Errol "Crusher" Bennett – percussion
- Thom Bridwell – acoustic piano
- Patrick Adams – Fender Rhodes
- Philip Woo – synthesizer
- Jimmy Smith – keyboards
- Stan Lucas, Ken Mazur, Cornell Dupree, Ronald Miller, Emanuel "Rahiem" LeBlanc, Hiram Bullock, Jeff Mironov – guitar
- Arrangers: Patrick Adams & Ken Morris (Rhythm), Ray Chew (Strings & Horns)
- Background Singers (except “I Ain’t Got Nowhere to Go”): Alfonso Thornton, Carole Sylvan & Michelle Cobbs
- Sam Burtis, Harold Vick, George Opalisky, Howard Johnson, Mike Lawrence, Virgil Jones, Gerald Chamberlain, Randy Brecker, Michael Brecker, Barry Rogers – horns

== Production ==
- Producers: Candi Staton & Jimmy Simpson
- Recorded at Sigma Sound Studios, New York City
- Recording and Mixing Engineer: Andy Abrams
- Additional Recording Engineers: Carmine Rubino & Steve Tose
- Assistant Engineers: Craig Michaels, Matthew Weiner, Carla Bandini & John Potoker
- Mastered at Columbia, New York by Stuart J. Romaine
- Album Art Direction: Peter Whorf
- Photography: Mario Casilli
