= Candi Staton =

American singer–songwriter (born 1940)

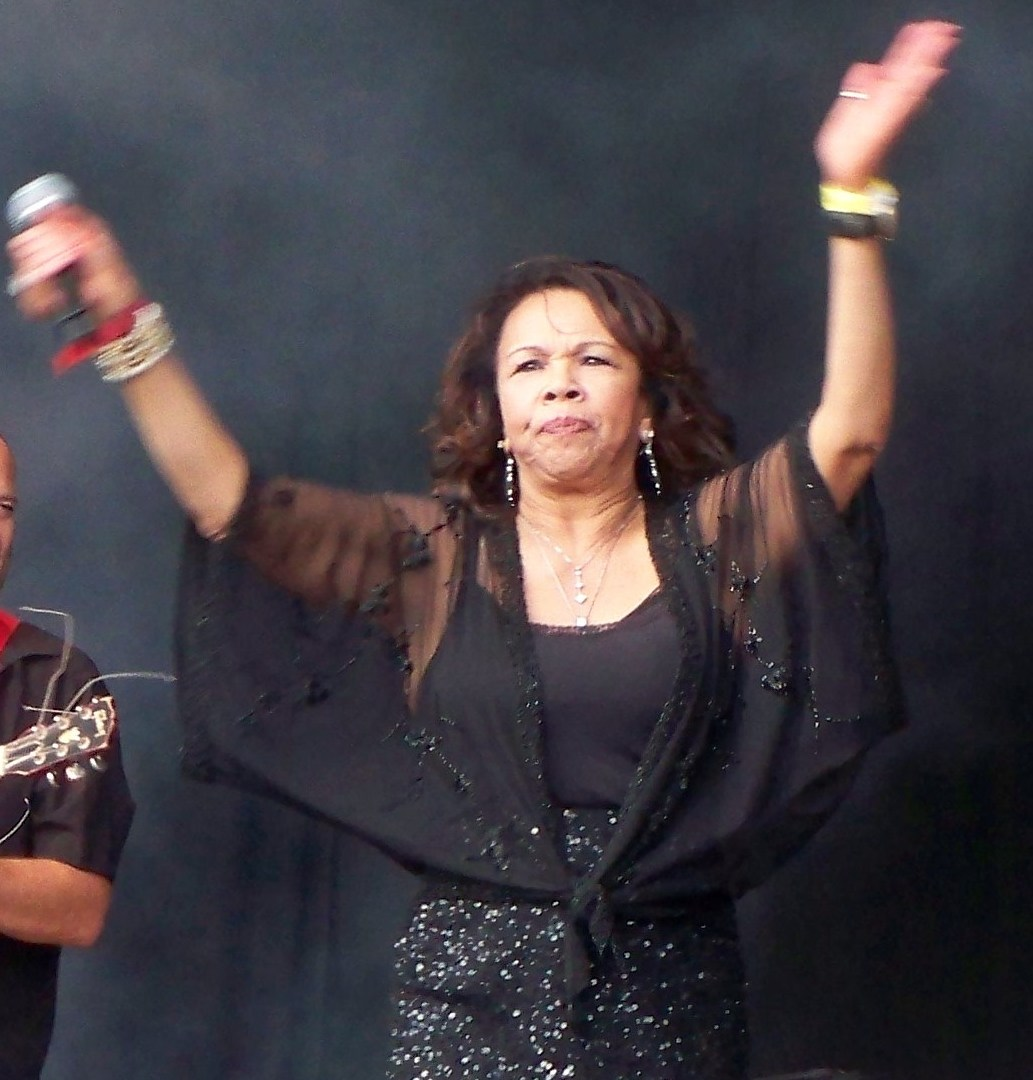
- Staton in 2012
- Born: Canzetta Maria Staton; March 13, 1940 (age 86); Hanceville, Alabama, U.S.
- Occupations: Singer; songwriter
- Spouses: Joe Williams (m. 1960; div. 1968) Clarence Carter (m. 1970; div. 1973) Jimmy James (m. 1974; div. 1977) John Sussewell (m. 1980; div. 1998) Otis Nixon (m. 2010; div. 2012) Henry Hooper (m. 2017)
- Children: 5
- Musical career
- Genres: Soul; R&B; gospel; house; dance; disco
- Years active: 1953–present
- Labels: Apollo; Savoy; Warner Bros.; Fame; Positiva; Intersound
- Website: candi-staton.com

Canzetta Maria "Candi" Staton (/ˈsteɪtən/, STAY-tən) (born March 13, 1940) is an American singer, best known in the United States for her 1970 cover of Tammy Wynette's "Stand by Your Man" and her 1976 disco chart-topper "Young Hearts Run Free". In Europe, Staton's biggest selling record is the anthemic "You Got the Love" from 1986, released in collaboration with the Source. Staton was inducted into the Christian Music Hall of Fame and is a five-time Grammy Award nominee.

== Biography ==
=== Early life and career ===
Born in Hanceville, Alabama, Staton and her sister Maggie were sent to Nashville, Tennessee at around age 11 or 12 for school. While attending Jewell Christian Academy, Staton's vocal abilities were soon noticed by her peers and the school's pastor. Amazed by her voice, the pastor paired Staton and her sister with a third girl, Naomi Harrison, and they formed the Jewell Gospel Trio. As teenagers, the group toured the traditional gospel circuit during the 1950s with the Soul Stirrers, C. L. Franklin and Mahalia Jackson. They recorded several sides for Nashboro, Apollo and Savoy Records between 1953 and 1963.

=== Solo career ===
In 1968, Staton was introduced to Rick Hall by Clarence Carter and launched her solo career as a Southern soul stylist, garnering 16 R&B hits for Rick Hall's FAME Studios and gaining the title of "First Lady of Southern Soul" for her Grammy-nominated R&B renditions of the songs "Stand by Your Man" and "In the Ghetto". Staton appeared on the September 23, 1972, edition (Season 2, Episode 1) of Soul Train.

In 1976, Staton began collaborating with producer David Crawford on disco songs such as "Young Hearts Run Free", which reached No. 1 on the US R&B charts, No. 2 in the UK Singles Chart and went Top 20 on the Billboard Hot 100 during the summer of 1976. It was remixed and re-released in 1986, reaching the UK Top 50. Follow up song "Destiny" hit the Top 50 in the UK. and her version of "Nights on Broadway" hit the UK Top 10 in 1977;. In 1978, Staton scored another Top 50 hit in the UK with "Honest I Do Love You". In 1979 from her album Chance, Staton released the single "When You Wake Up Tomorrow" (co-written by Patrick Adams and Wayne K. Garfield) and the title song "Chance", a top 20 R&B charted record. Other dance club chart hits included "When You Wake Up Tomorrow" and "Victim". In 1982, Staton again hit the UK chart with a version of Mark James's "Suspicious Minds".

In 1982, Staton returned to gospel music. Staton and her then-husband, John Sussewell, founded Beracah Ministries in Atlanta, Georgia, with help from Jim and Tammy Faye Bakker's PTL Ministries. Staton has since recorded twelve gospel albums, two of which received Grammy Award nominations. Staton appears on the United Nations Register of Entertainers, Actors And Others Who Have Performed in Apartheid South Africa.

=== Later ===
In 1991, Staton returned to UK popular charts by lending her vocals to the Source's British hit "You Got the Love". Staton signed with Intersound Records in 1995. In 2000, she released her eleventh album, Here's a Blessing. In 2004, the British record label Honest Jon's released a compilation album of her soul work from the late 1960s and early 1970s, the self-titled Candi Staton. Staton followed it up with a secular project in 2006 entitled His Hands, produced by Mark Nevers of Lambchop and with the title track written by Will Oldham. Two of Staton's children, Cassandra Williams-Hightower (background vocals) and Marcus Williams (drums), joined her on the album. A second studio album for Honest Jon's, titled Who's Hurting Now?, appeared in 2009. She and Rick Hall reunited to make a half dozen more tracks for Staton's 2014 southern soul album, Life Happens. The lead Americana radio single, "I Ain't Easy to Love", featured Jason Isbell and John Paul White (formerly of The Civil Wars). The trio performed the track on Late Show with David Letterman. Staton's television show New Direction aired on TBN.

Staton has also made appearances on the Praise the Lord telecast with the late Paul Crouch and his late wife Jan Crouch, as well as regularly performing on Robert Tilton's Success-N-Life show. In August 2018, Staton released her 30th album, Unstoppable, which has been touted as a retro psychedelic R&B project. NPR music journalist, Alison Fensterstock, wrote that it, "Delivers the kind of forthright confidence and soul-girding power that can only be summoned by a grown woman who has learned a thing or two. And Staton has lived many lives. Creatively, the quadruple Grammy nominee and Christian Music Hall of Famer has moved between soul and R&B, gospel, disco and even EDM before returning to her roots as an elder stateswoman."

== Personal life ==
Staton has been married six times and has five children. She was first married to Pentecostal minister, Joe Williams, from 1960 until 1968. Together they had four children: Marcus Williams, Marcel Williams, Terry Williams and Cassandra Williams-Hightower. In 1970, Staton married singer Clarence Carter and together they had one child, Clarence Carter Jr. They divorced in 1973. Staton was married to Jimmy James, her then manager, from 1974 until 1977. Two years after divorcing James, Staton married John Sussewell, who was a drummer for Ashford & Simpson and also on Dory Previn's sixth album We're Children of Coincidence and Harpo Marx in 1980. They divorced in 1998 after 18 years of marriage. From 2010 until 2012, Staton was married to former baseball player Otis Nixon. She has been married to Henry Hooper since 2017.

On October 30, 2018, Staton announced that she had been diagnosed with breast cancer. She lives in Atlanta, Georgia.

== Discography ==
=== Studio albums ===
- I'm Just a Prisoner (1970)
- Stand By Your Man (1971)
- Candi Staton (1972)
- Candi (1974)
- Young Hearts Run Free (1976)
- Music Speaks Louder Than Words (1977)
- House of Love (1978)
- Chance (1979)
- Candi Staton (1980)
- Nightlites (1982)
- Make Me an Instrument (1983)
- The Anointing (1985)
- Sing a Song (1986)
- Love Lifted Me (1988)
- Stand Up and Be a Witness (1990)
- Standing on the Promises (1991)
- I Give You Praise (1993)
- It's Time! (1995)
- Cover Me (1997)
- Outside In (1999)
- Here's a Blessing (2000)
- Christmas in My Heart (2000)
- Glorify (2001)
- Proverbs 31 Woman (2002)
- His Hands (2006)
- I Will Sing My Praise to You (2008)
- Who's Hurting Now? (2009)
- Life Happens (2014)
- It's Time to Be Free (2016)
- Unstoppable (2018)
- Back to My Roots (2025)

=== Compilations ===
- The Best of Candi Staton (1995 Warner Archives) Originals (not re-recorded)
- The Ultimate Gospel Collection (2006)
- Evidence: The Complete Fame Records Masters (2011) – For the first time ever all 48 of the tracks she made for Rick Hall's label between 1969 and 1974 are together in one place. 22 have never been on CD before and 12 are previously unreleased.

=== Singles (non comprehensive) ===
- "I'd Rather Be an Old Man's Sweetheart (Than a Young Man's Fool)" (1969) R&B No. 9 US No. 46, CAN No. 51
- "I'm Just a Prisoner (Of Your Good Lovin')" (1969) R&B No. 13 US No. 56, CAN No. 74
- "Sweet Feeling" (1970) R&B No. 5 US No. 60, CAN No. 78
- "Stand by Your Man" (1970) R&B No. 4 US No. 24, CAN No. 22
- "He Called Me Baby" (1971) R&B No. 9 US No. 52, CAN No. 67
- "In the Ghetto" (1972) R&B No. 12 US No. 48
- "Do It in the Name of Love" (1973) R&B No. 17 US No. 80
- "As Long as He Takes Care of Home" (1974) R&B No. 6 US No. 51, CAN No. 56
- "Young Hearts Run Free" (1976) US No. 20 UK No. 2 R&B No. 1 (1986 re-release No. 47, 1999 re-release No. 29) CAN No. 21
- "Destiny" (1976) UK No. 41
- "Nights on Broadway" (1977) UK No. 6 R&B No. 16 US No. 102
- "Honest I Do Love You" (1978) UK No. 48 R&B No. 77
- "Victim" (1978) R&B No. 17
- "When You Wake Up Tomorrow" (1979) R&B No. 13
- "Suspicious Minds" (1982) UK No. 31
- "You Got the Love" (1986) UK No. 95 R&B No. 88
- "You Got the Love" (The Source featuring Candi Staton – 1991) UK No. 4 (1997 re-release UK No. 3 (Now Voyager Mix), 2005 import release UK No. 60, 2006 "You Got the Love (New Voyager Mix)" (featuring Candi Staton – re-release) No. 7 UK)
- "Love On Love" (1999) UK No. 27
- "Young Hearts Run Free" (re-recording) (1999) UK No. 29
- "I Just Can't Get to Sleep at All" (2000) Energise Records, UK; limited release
- "Love Sweet Sound" Groove Armada featuring Candi Staton (2007) UK No. 77
- "Wilder Side" Rasmus Faber & Alf Tumble featuring Candi Staton (2010)
- "Hallelujah Anyway" (2012)
- "It's Your Season (B.W.Ø Remix)" (2016)

== Grammy Awards ==
| Year | Category | Work | Result | Ref. |
|---|---|---|---|---|
| 1971 | Best Female R&B Vocal Performance | "Stand by Your Man" | Nominated | |
| 1973 | Best Female R&B Vocal Performance | "In The Ghetto" | Nominated | |
| 1984 | Best Soul Gospel Performance, Female | "Make Me An Instrument" | Nominated | |
| 1987 | Best Soul Gospel Performance, Female | "Sing A Song" | Nominated | |
| 2026 | Best Roots Gospel Album | Back to My Roots | Nominated | |
