= Frankie Knuckles =

American DJ and record producer (1955–2014)

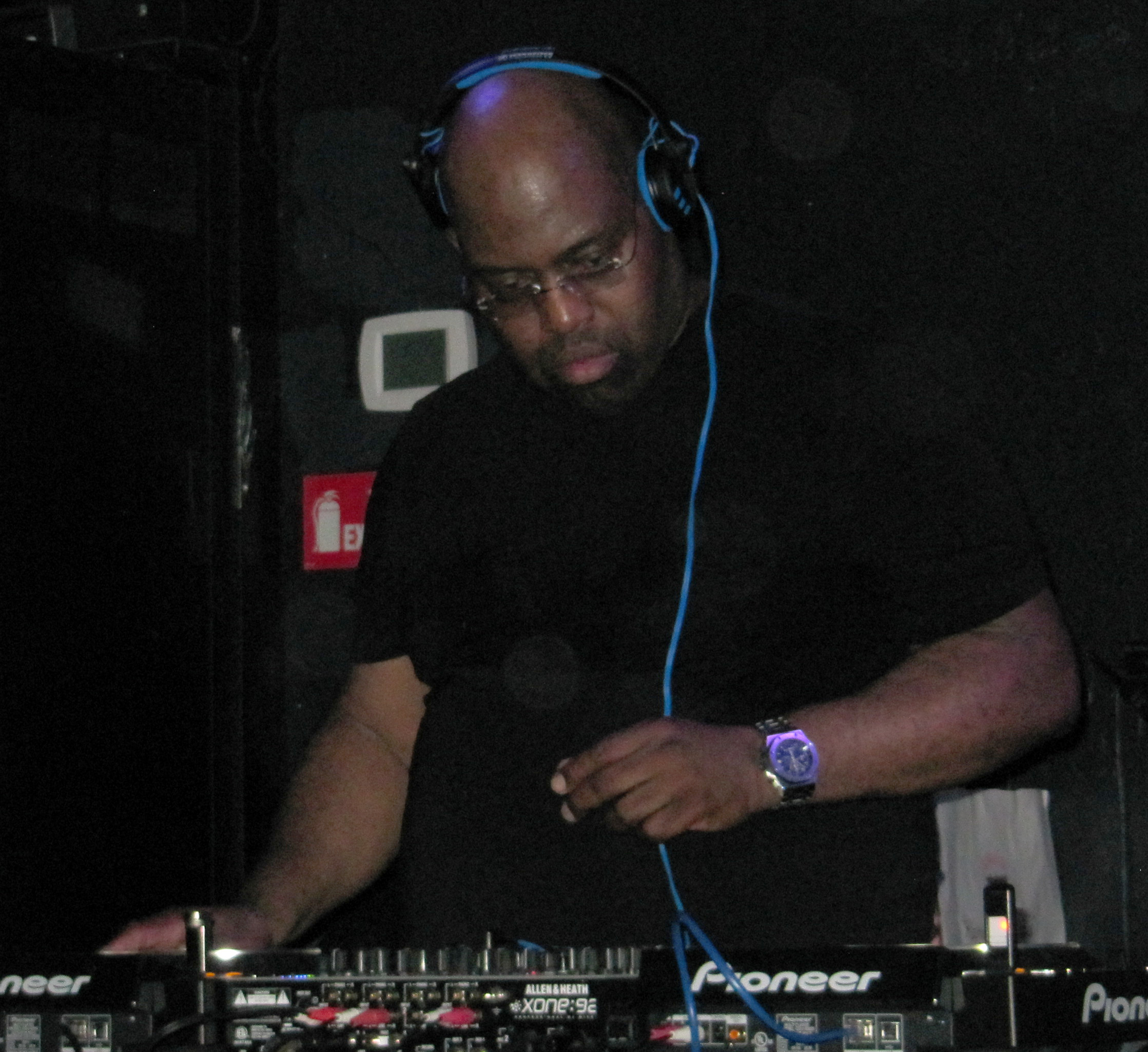
- Knuckles performing in 2012

Background information
- Born: Francis Warren Nicholls Jr. January 18, 1955; New York City, U.S.
- Died: March 31, 2014 (aged 59) Chicago, Illinois, U.S.
- Genres: House; soul; disco; R&B; Chicago house
- Occupations: DJ; record producer; remixer
- Instruments: Turntable; sampler
- Works: Frankie Knuckles discography
- Years active: 1975–2014
- Label: Virgin

Francis Warren Nicholls Jr. (January 18, 1955 – March 31, 2014), known professionally as Frankie Knuckles, was an American DJ, record producer, and remixer. He played an important role in developing and popularizing house music, which originated in Chicago during the early 1980s and spread worldwide. In 1997, Knuckles won the Grammy Award for Remixer of the Year, Non-Classical. Knuckles was often called "the godfather of house music".

== Musical career ==
=== 1970s–1980s ===
Born in New York City, in the Bronx, Knuckles and his friend Larry Levan began frequenting discos as teenagers. While studying textile design at the FIT, Knuckles and Levan began working as DJs, playing soul, disco, and R&B at two of the most important early discos, The Continental Baths and The Gallery. Their DJing led them to the Loft and the Gallery, with Levan becoming the main DJ at the Continental Baths. Knuckles, initially hesitant about the Baths, eventually began playing there until its closure in 1976.

The Continental Baths, located below the Ansonia Hotel, was an opulent gay bathhouse known for its steam rooms, swimming pool, disco, and more. Levan left in 1974, later establishing the prototype for the Paradise Garage. After Levan's departure, Knuckles became the Baths' resident DJ until its closure.

In the late 1970s, Knuckles moved from New York City to Chicago, where his old friend, Robert Williams, was opening what became the nightclub called Warehouse. When the club opened in Chicago in 1977, he was invited to play on a regular basis. Knuckles accepted the offer and moved to Chicago in 1977, becoming the resident DJ at the Warehouse, situated in Chicago's west side industrial zone. Knuckles's DJ sets at the Warehouse drew in crowds of up to 2,000 people, primarily from the black and gay demographic.

In the late 1970s, as disco faced challenges, Knuckles sought ways to keep the genre alive in Chicago. He began experimenting with re-edits of songs, extending intros and breaks, and adding new beats to rejuvenate old favorites. These DJ alchemy experiments at the Warehouse laid the foundation for the emergence of house music. While the Warehouse initially faced skepticism from the wider Chicago club scene, it eventually gained recognition as adventurous straight audiences began attending. Wayne Williams, a young DJ from the south side, was among those influenced by Knuckles's music. Williams, inspired by the unique sound, introduced it to his audiences, becoming one of Chicago's most successful DJs and spreading the "house" sound beyond the gay clubs.

House music's name itself originated from the Warehouse, reflecting the exclusive, underground vibe of the club. Initially, "house" referred to an attitude and a feeling associated with cool, underground music. As Knuckles continued to reshape disco tracks and experiment with remixing, the term "house" evolved into a genre of its own.

Knuckles continued DJing at the Warehouse until November 1982, when he started his own Chicago club, The Power Plant.

Around 1983, to enhance his mixes, Knuckles bought his first drum machine from Derrick May, a young DJ who regularly made the trip from Detroit to see Knuckles at the Warehouse and Ron Hardy at the Music Box, both in Chicago. The combination of bare, insistent drum machine pulses and an overlay of cult disco classics defined the sound of early Chicago house music, a sound which many local producers began to mimic in the studios by 1985.

When his next club the Powerhouse closed in 1987, Knuckles moved to the UK for four months and DJ-ed at DELIRIUM!, a Thursday night party at Heaven, a gay nightclub in London. Chicago house artists were in high demand and having major success in the UK with this new genre of music. Knuckles also had a stint in New York, where he continued to immerse himself in producing, remixing, and recording. 1988 saw the release of Pet Shop Boys' third album, Introspective, which featured Knuckles as a co-producer of the song "I Want a Dog".

=== Work with Jamie Principle ===
In 1982, Knuckles was introduced to then-unknown Jamie Principle by mutual friend Jose "Louie" Gomez, who had recorded the original vocal-dub of "Your Love" to reel-to-reel tape. Louie Gomez met up with Frankie at the local record pool (I.R.S.) and gave him a tape copy of the track. Knuckles played Gomez's unreleased dub mix for an entire year in his sets during which it became a crowd favorite. Knuckles later went into the studio to re-record the track with Principle, and in 1987 helped put Your Love and Baby Wants to Ride out on vinyl after these tunes had been regulars on his reel-to-reel player at the Warehouse for a year.

As house music was developing in Chicago, producer Chip E. took Knuckles under his tutelage and produced Knuckles's first recording, "You Can't Hide from Yourself". Then came more production work, including Jamie Principle's "Baby Wants to Ride", and later "Tears" with Robert Owens (of Fingers Inc.) and (Knuckles's protégé and future Def Mix associate) Satoshi Tomiie.

=== 1990s–2010s ===
Knuckles (left) and Chris McAvoy (right) at the DJ Hut, Washington, DC (January 13, 2006)

Knuckles made numerous popular Def Classic Mixes with John Poppo as sound engineer, and Knuckles partnered with David Morales on Def Mix Productions. His debut album Beyond the Mix (1991), released on Virgin Records, contained what would be considered his seminal work, "The Whistle Song", which was the first of four number ones on the US dance chart. The Def Classic mix of Lisa Stansfield's "Change", released in the same year, also featured the whistle-like motif. Another track from the album, "Rain Falls", featured vocals from Lisa Michaelis. Eight thousand copies of the album had sold by 2004. Other key remixes from this time include his rework of the Electribe 101 anthem "Talking with Myself" and Alison Limerick's "Where Love Lives".

When Junior Vasquez took a sabbatical from The Sound Factory in Manhattan, Knuckles took over and launched a successful run as resident DJ. He continued to work as a remixer through the 1990s and into the next decade, reworking tracks from Michael Jackson, Luther Vandross, Diana Ross, Eternal and Toni Braxton. He released several new singles, including "Keep on Movin'" and a re-issue of an earlier hit "Bac N Da Day" with Definity Records. In 1995, he released his second album titled Welcome to the Real World. By 2004, 13,000 copies had sold.

In 2004, Knuckles released a 13-track album of original material – his first in over a decade – titled A New Reality.

== Death ==
In the mid-2000s, Knuckles developed Type II diabetes. He developed osteomyelitis after breaking his foot snowboarding, and had it amputated after declining to take time off for treatment. On March 31, 2014, he died in Chicago at the age of 59 due to the complications from his diabetes.

== Legacy ==
In April 2015, a year after his death, Defected Records released a retrospective compilation, House Masters Frankie Knuckles; Knuckles had selected the track list before his death. Also, the same month, as a tribute to Knuckles, a version of his song "Baby Wants to Ride" was released by Underworld and Heller and Farley to mark the year anniversary of his death. It went straight to number one on the UK's first ever Official Vinyl Singles Chart. All proceeds went to the Frankie Knuckles Trust/Elton John AIDS Foundation. A year after his death, on April 4, 2015, an in Memoriam Essential Mix on BBC Radio 1 was played containing two previously unreleased Knuckles mixes. Knuckles was featured in the documentary films Maestro (2003), written and directed by Josell Ramos; The UnUsual Suspects: Once Upon a Time in House Music (2005), directed by Chip E.; and Continental (2013) about the Continental Baths.

Frankie Knuckles established a signature performance style characterized by consistently wearing a simple black t-shirt during his DJ sets starting in the 1980s. This minimalist aesthetic became an influential professional statement within electronic dance music, signaling a focus on musical authenticity and technical skill over visual performance.

Frankie Knuckles famously referred to house music as "disco's revenge" – a phrase that has been lauded by artists and DJs since his passing.

Frankie Knuckles's role in the creation of Chicago house music was discussed in Episode 3 of the 2024 PBS series Disco: Soundtrack of a Revolution.

== Awards and honors ==
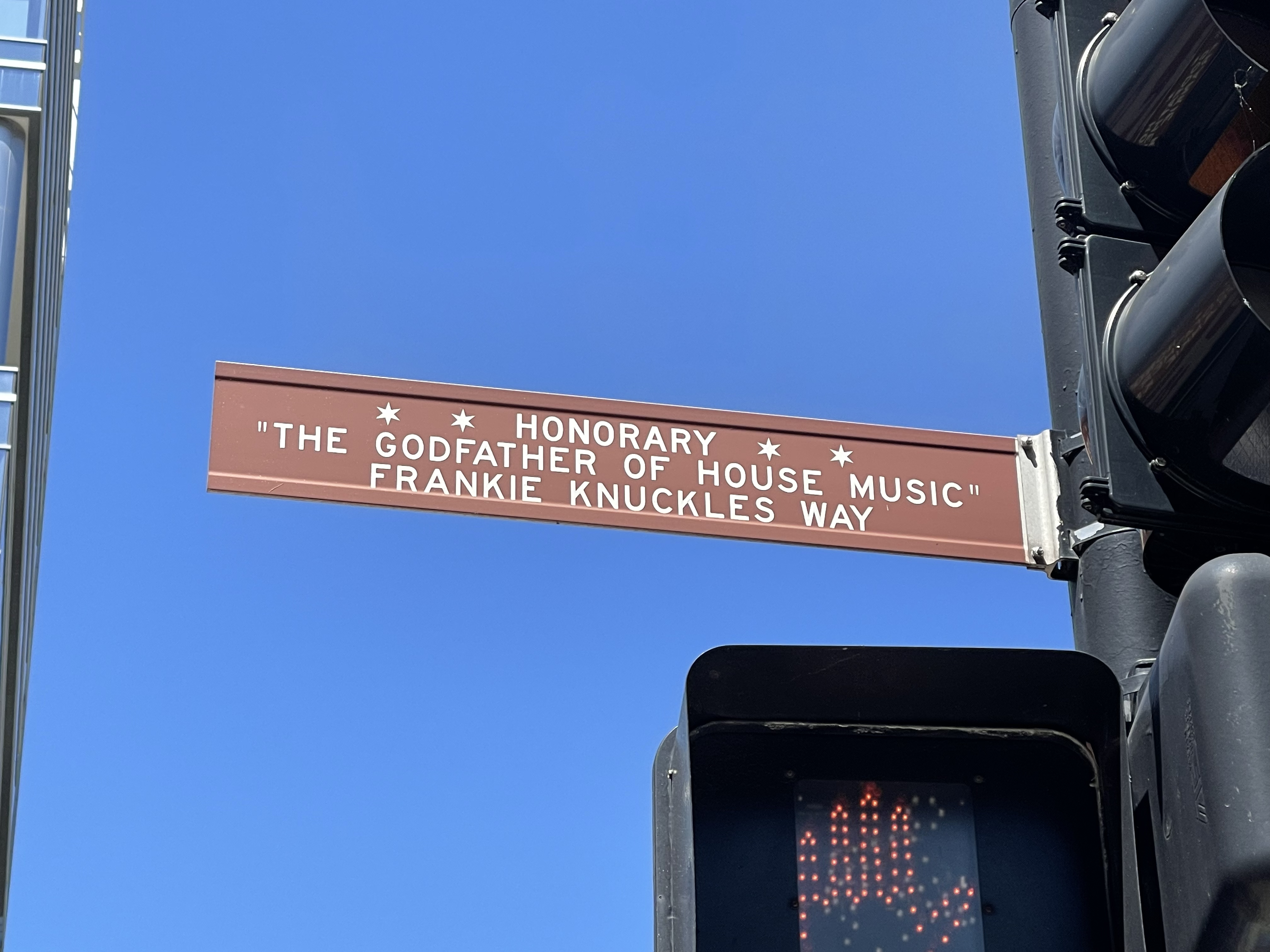
A section of Jefferson Street in Chicago near the site of Warehouse was renamed the Honorary "the Godfather of House Music" Frankie Knuckles Way on August 25, 2004.

List of awards and nominations received by Frankie Knuckles
Year	Award	Category	Result	Ref.
1996	Chicago LGBT Hall of Fame		Inducted	
1998	Grammy Awards	Remixer of the Year, Non-Classical	Won	
1998	Grammy Awards	Remixer of the Year, Non-Classical	Nominated	
2005	Dance Music Hall of Fame		Inducted	

- Chicago's second annual "Great Battle of the DJs" was held at the Aragon Ballroom in 1980. Eight DJs competed in mixing music for 4,000 dancers. Knuckles shared top prize with Peter Lewicki.
- In 2004, the city of Chicago – which "became notorious in the dance community around the world for passing the so-called 'anti-rave ordinance' in 2000 that made property owners, promoters and deejays subject to $10,000 fines for being involved in an unlicensed dance party" – named a stretch of Jefferson Street located between Jackson Boulevard and Madison Street after Knuckles, the former location of the Warehouse. That stretch of street, called Frankie Knuckles Way, "was renamed when the city declared August 25, 2004, as Frankie Knuckles Day. The Illinois state senator who helped make it happen was Barack Obama."

=== DJ Magazine Top 100 DJs ===
Year	Position	Notes	Ref.
1997	49	New Entry	
1998	54	Down 5	
1999	23	Up 31	
2000	69	Down 46	
2001	95	Down 26	
2002	78	Up 17	
2003	90	Down 12	

== Discography ==
- Beyond the Mix (1991)
- Welcome to the Real World (1995)

== See also ==
- Club Zanzibar (black electronic-music venue in 1980s-era Newark, New Jersey)
- List of artists who reached number one on the US Dance chart
- List of number-one dance hits (United States)
