= Jamie Principle =

American house music artist and producer

Jamie Principle (born July 5, 1960) is an American house music artist and producer born in Chicago, Illinois.

== Biography ==
Principle began having entries on the Billboard Hot Dance Music/Club Play chart in the early 1990s, including "Cold World", a No. 22 dance hit that is a collaboration with Steve "Silk" Hurley, the classic "You're All I Waited For" on the Smash Records label, or with CeCe Peniston's song "I'm Not Over You" (No. 2 in US Dance, No. 10 in US R&B) that he would co-write.

Principle's 1984 song "Your Love" is recognised as one of the first house songs. Its lyrics come from a poem that Principle wrote for his girlfriend at the time, Lisa Harris. Jamie added the music and recorded the song at home on his four-track recorder. A friend, Jose Gomez, recorded the song on tape and gave a copy to DJ Frankie Knuckles. Knuckles liked the song and played it regularly at the Chicago dance club The Power Plant. It was a sensation in the city's underground clubs for over a year before being released on Persona Records as a 12" single. Its success before an official release was entirely due to the song being played in Chicago house clubs, then copied onto tape by fans, and circulating throughout the underground scene.

Principle's music continued to be released throughout the 1980s but often credited Knuckles as the artist. These releases included "Baby Wants to Ride", "Cold World", "Bad Boy", "Rebels", "Waiting on My Angel" and "I'm Gonna Make You Scream". In 1992, Principle released a dance album titled The Midnite Hour.

In 2004, Principle hit No. 1 on the US Dance Chart with "Back N Da Day", an acknowledged collaboration with Knuckles.

Principle was featured on "Sex Murder Party" from Gorillaz' 2017 album Humanz. He also features alongside Snoop Dogg on the Gorillaz song "Hollywood" on 2018's The Now Now.

Principle is featured in Episode 3 of the 2024 PBS series Disco: Soundtrack of a Revolution.

== Discography ==
=== Albums ===
- The Midnite Hour (1992)

=== Singles ===
- "Your Love" (1984)
- "Waiting On My Angel" (1985) US dance single sales No. 40
- "Bad Boy" (1987)
- "I'm Gonna Make You Scream" (1987)
- "Rebels" (1988) UK No. 100
- "Baby Wants To Ride" (1988) UK No. 84
- Frankie Knuckles ft Jamie Principle : "Your Love" (1989) UK No. 59 (2014) UK No. 29
- "Cold World" : Steve "Silk" Hurley ft Jamie Principle (1989) US dance club No. 22 US dance single sales No. 36
- "Date With The Rain" (1990) US dance club No. 30 US dance singles sales No. 31
- "You're All I've Waited 4" (1991) US dance club No. 18 : The Midnite Hour
- Frankie Kuckles ft Jamie Principle : "Back N Da Day" (2004) US dance club No. 1 UK No. 163
- Waiting on My Angel (2011)
- Gorillaz ft Jamie Principle and Zebra Kats : "Sex Murder Party" (2017) US hot rock and alternative songs No. 47
- Gorillaz ft Jamie Principle and Snoop Dogg : "Hollywood" (2018) US hot rock and alternative songs No. 26
- Lonely2live (with Felix da Housecat) (2020)

== See also ==
- List of number-one dance hits (United States)
- List of artists who reached number one on the US Dance chart
- Club Zanzibar (black electronic-music venue in 1980s-era Newark, New Jersey)
