= Spectrum (Say My Name) =

2012 single by Florence and the Machine

Single by Florence and the Machine

from the album Ceremonials
- B-side: "Spectrum (Say My Name)" (Calvin Harris Remix)
- Released: 6 July 2012
- Genre: Baroque pop; art pop; indie pop (album version); orchestral pop; dance-pop; disco (single version)
- Length: 5:11 (album version); 3:40 (Calvin Harris Remix); 6:25 (Calvin Harris Extended Remix)
- Label: Island
- Songwriters: Florence Welch; Paul Epworth
- Producers: Paul Epworth; Calvin Harris (remix)

Florence and the Machine singles chronology
"Breath of Life" (2012)	"Spectrum (Say My Name)" (2012)	"Lover to Lover" (2012)

Music video
- "Spectrum" on YouTube

"Spectrum" is a song by the English indie rock band Florence and the Machine from their second studio album Ceremonials (2011). It was written by lead singer Florence Welch and Paul Epworth with production being handled by Epworth. The band premiered the song during a concert at Brooklyn's Creators Project on 15 October 2011, prior to the release of the album. The album version of "Spectrum" is a downtempo orchestral pop, dance-pop and disco song. The accompanying music video for the song premiered on 30 May 2012. It was directed by David LaChapelle and John Byrne.

A remix of the album version of "Spectrum", titled "Spectrum (Say My Name)", was released on 6 July 2012 by Island Records, serving as the fourth single from Ceremonials. Scottish DJ Calvin Harris remixed "Spectrum", producing the uptempo single. "Spectrum (Say My Name)" became the group's first single to peak at number one on the UK Singles Chart, selling 64,816 copies in its first week. It also reached number one in Ireland and Scotland and has peaked within the top five in Australia and New Zealand.

== Background and composition ==
Florence and the Machine premiered "Spectrum" along with six other songs from the album, "Only If for a Night", "What the Water Gave Me" (though this was not a live debut), "Heartlines", "Never Let Me Go", Shake It Out" and "No Light, No Light" as part of their set list at Brooklyn's Creators Project on 15 October 2011, two weeks before the release of the album. Musically, "Spectrum" is a downtempo orchestral pop, R&B, krautrock and disco song with drums while backing vocals repeatedly sing "Say my name" throughout the choruses. According to the sheet music published by Universal Music Publishing Group on the website Musicnotes.com, the song is set in the key B minor. The song's beat is set in common time, and moves at a tempo of 124 beats per minute. Welch's vocals span from the note of F#3 to the note of F#5 or B5 in the Calvin Harris remix.

== Critical reception ==
"Spectrum" received mostly positive reviews by critics. While reviewing Ceremonials, Jillian Mapes of Billboard complimented Welch's vocal performance, stating, "'Say my name,' she howls then later croons, both filled with sensuality. Welch's impressive vocal range and volume are firing on all cylinders here." A writer of Rolling Stone praised the song calling it "a huge, churchy tune, even in the context of the band's typically bombastic blend of arena rock and gospel." Lewis Corner from Digital Spy gave the song four stars out of five, saying "if there's one thing latest single 'Spectrum' proves, it's that she knows how to write a distinctive uptempo number without compromising her style." He added that the song "[...] belts over a rapturous chorus complete with rousing piano and delicate strings – demonstrating that techno synths are not the only key to a euphoric hook."

Matthew Cole from Slant Magazine said along with "Lover to Lover" and "Remain Nameless"; "spectacular when taken alone or on a playlist." Kitty Empire from The Guardian gave it a mixed remark, saying "Clubby and kaleidoscopic, 'Spectrum' sounds like another rallying cry." Margaret Wappler of Los Angeles Times said they could hear a "harp gorgeously flutter[s] and dips around her." Chris Saunders from musicOMH compared it, musically, to the song from Florence's previous record Lungs. The Independent commented; "The only time she and The Machine stray from the formula is the Krautrock-disco motorik of 'Spectrum'; elsewhere, declamatory piano chords and burring organ underpin the banked [...]"

== Music video ==
=== Background ===
An accompanying music video for the song was released on Florence and the Machine's YouTube account on 30 May 2012. Directed by David LaChapelle and John Byrne, the video depicts ballet dancers of California's Southland Ballet Academy/Festival Ballet Theatre pirouetting, jumping, and dancing around Welch. During an interview, Welch spoke about her collaboration with LaChapelle, "It was a complete dream to work with David LaChapelle. I collected his books as a teenager, and I fantasised that he would direct the video for 'Spectrum' from the moment the song was written. I still can't believe it actually happened, and I'm completely overjoyed that he felt such a connection with the song." During an interview, LaChapelle also spoke about his collaboration with Welch, "It's a beautiful song that really touched me and inspired me to create imagery that matches its power. 'Spectrum' is free of scepticism, irony, and the coldness one finds in a lot of contemporary popular music. It's the opposite—full of light, positivity and authentic joy. I hope that I can do justice to this moving modern classic."

=== Reception ===
Upon the release of the video, critics praised Welch's look and the video's dark atmosphere. A writer of Rolling Stone wrote, "Music video legend David LaChappelle rose to the challenge of making a clip for the song, matching its drama and energy with a vivid color pallette and incredibly theatrical staging." Robbie Daw of Idolator stated the video's visual is "as bombastic and over the top as the song itself [...] there's enough completely koo koo eye candy being hurled at us that we're barely even paying attention to the song itself."

== Live performances ==
The band performed the song on first series of the American version of The X Factor during its semi-finals. Florence and the Machine added the song to the set list of their second worldwide Ceremonials Tour (2011–12) where the song was performed during the encore of the concerts along with "No Light, No Light". On 12 September 2012, Florence performed a stripped-down version of the song on Late Night with Jimmy Fallon.

British DJ and producer Ilan Bluestone played a mashup of Spectrum with his song "Under My Skin" during his live set at Madison Square Garden for Above & Beyond's ABGT100 show.

== Calvin Harris remix ==
A remix of the album version of "Spectrum", titled "Spectrum (Say My Name)", was released on 6 July 2012 by Island Records, serving as the fourth single from Ceremonials. Scottish DJ Calvin Harris remixed "Spectrum", producing the uptempo electro house-inspired single. "Spectrum (Say My Name)" received positive reviews from music critics, praising the production and Welch's vocals. Commercially, it became the group's first single to peak at number one on the UK Singles Chart, selling 64,816 copies in its first week. It also reached number one in Ireland and Scotland and has peaked within the top five in Australia and New Zealand.

=== Background and development ===
On 25 May 2012, a lyric video was released for the Calvin Harris remix. The song was released as the album's fifth single on 5 July 2012. It was serviced to radio in the UK on 2 July 2012. On the release of the single, the Calvin Harris remix was released. Lewis Corner of Digital Spy commented that "While the single version is near perfection, an accompanying Calvin Harris remix highlights just how big a Florence house anthem can be". The instrumental version of "Spectrum" was used extensively during the BBC's coverage of the London 2012 Olympic Games, often as the backing track to their round-up of the day's sporting action.

=== Commercial performance ===
"Spectrum" debuted at number 104 on the UK Singles Chart based on the sales of the album version. On 15 July 2012, following the release of the Calvin Harris remix of the song, it climbed the chart to become the band's first number-one single in the UK, selling 64,816 copies in its first week. The song stayed on top of the chart for three weeks. It also debuted at number 35 on the New Zealand Singles Chart, until rising to number two, becoming the group's first top ten single in that country. It peaked at the top spot in the Republic of Ireland. In the UK, it was the best-selling single of the third quarter of 2012, selling 453,000 copies. The song has sold 554,000 copies in the UK in 2012, and was the 19th best-selling single of 2012. However, in 2013, it was certified platinum for selling over 600,000 copies. It is Florence + the Machine's best-selling single in the United Kingdom.

== Track listing ==
"Spectrum (Say My Name)" Remixes EP
No.	Title	Length
1.	"Spectrum (Say My Name)" (Calvin Harris Remix)	3:38
2.	"Spectrum (Say My Name)" (Calvin Harris Extended Remix)	6:25
3.	"Spectrum (Say My Name)" (AlunaGeorge Remix)	3:29
4.	"Spectrum (Say My Name)" (Maya Jane Coles Remix)	5:00
5.	"Spectrum (Say My Name)" (Taito Tikaro and Flavio Zarza Remix)	7:26

== Charts ==
=== Weekly charts ===
Chart (2012–2013)	Peak position
Australia (ARIA)	4
Austria (Ö3 Austria Top 40)	51
Belgium (Ultratop 50 Flanders)	2
Belgium (Ultratop 50 Wallonia)	9
Czech Republic Airplay (ČNS IFPI)	28
Denmark (Tracklisten)	13
Germany (GfK)	32
Hungary (Dance Top 40)	27
Hungary (Rádiós Top 40)	1
Ireland (IRMA)	1
Israel International Airplay (Media Forest)	4
Netherlands (Single Top 100)	55
New Zealand (Recorded Music NZ)	2
Poland Digital Songs (Billboard)	1
Poland Dance (ZPAV)	31
Portugal (Billboard)	2
Scottish Singles Sales (Official Charts)	1
Sweden (Sverigetopplistan)	36
Switzerland (Schweizer Hitparade)	58
UK Singles (Official Charts)	1
US Dance Club Songs (Billboard)	1
US Hot Rock & Alternative Songs (Billboard)	35
US Rock Digital Songs (Billboard)	49

=== Year-end charts ===
Chart (2012)	Position
Australia (ARIA)	52
Belgium (Ultratop Flanders)	21
Belgium (Ultratop Wallonia)	62
Hungary (Rádiós Top 40)	36
UK Singles (Official Charts Company)	19
US Dance Club Songs (Billboard)	3

Chart (2013)	Position
UK Singles (Official Charts Company)	168

== Certifications ==
Region	Certification	Certified units/sales
Australia (ARIA) EP edition	5× Platinum	350,000^{‡}
Belgium (BRMA)	Gold	15,000^{*}
Brazil (Pro-Música Brasil)	Gold	30,000^{‡}
Germany (BVMI)	Gold	150,000^{‡}
Italy (FIMI)	Gold	15,000^{‡}
New Zealand (RMNZ)	3× Platinum	90,000^{‡}
United Kingdom (BPI)	3× Platinum	1,800,000^{‡}
Streaming
Denmark (IFPI Danmark)	Gold	900,000^{†}
^{*} Sales figures based on certification alone.^{‡} Sales+streaming figures based on certification alone.^{†} Streaming-only figures based on certification alone.

== Release history ==
List of release dates, showing country, record label, and format
Region	Date	Format	Label
Australia	6 July 2012	Digital download – Remixes EP	Universal Music
United Kingdom	6 July 2012	Digital download – Remixes EP	Universal Island
United States	10 July 2012	Digital download – Remixes EP	Universal Republic
United States	7 May 2013	Mainstream Airplay	Universal Republic

== Morgan Seatree version ==
"Say My Name (remix)"

Single by Morgan Seatree featuring Florence and the Machine
- Released: 6 December 2024
- Length: 2:48
- Label: Positiva; EMI; Universal
- Songwriters: Paul Epworth; Florence Welch
- Producer: Paul Epworth

Morgan Seatree singles chronology
"Good Life" (2024)	"Say My Name (remix)" (2024)	"La Di Da" (2025)

British music producer Morgan Seatree released his version by Positiva Records, EMI Records, and Universal Music Group on 6 December 2024. The version topped the US Billboard Dance/Mix Show Airplay chart dated 31 May 2025.

=== Track listing ===
- Digital download and streaming
1. "Say My Name" (remix) – 2:48
- Digital download and streaming – extended
1. "Say My Name" (extended remix) – 4:34
- Digital download and streaming – dub
1. "Say My Name" (dub remix) – 2:48
- Digital download and streaming – Sub Focus remix
1. "Say My Name" (Sub Focus remix) – 3:13
- Digital download and streaming – In Parallel remix
1. "Say My Name" (In Parallel remix) – 2:43

=== Charts ===
==== Weekly charts ====
Weekly chart performance for "Say My Name (remix)"
Chart (2025)	Peak position
Ireland (IRMA)	24
Latvia Airplay (LaIPA)	8
Latvia Airplay (TopHit)	1
Lithuania Airplay (TopHit)	44
Netherlands (Single Top 100)	25
New Zealand Hot Singles (RMNZ)	16
UK Singles (Official Charts)	25
UK Dance (Official Charts)	4
US Hot Dance/Electronic Songs (Billboard)	15

==== Year-end charts ====
Year-end chart performance for "Say My Name (remix)"
Chart (2025)	Position
Belgium (Ultratop 50 Flanders)	107
Netherlands (Single Top 100)	70
UK Singles (OCC)	87
US Hot Dance/Electronic Songs (Billboard)	19

=== Certifications ===
Certifications and sales for "Say My Name (remix)"
Region	Certification	Certified units/sales
Belgium (BRMA)	Gold	20,000^{‡}
Canada (Music Canada)	Gold	40,000^{‡}
New Zealand (RMNZ)	Platinum	30,000^{‡}
United Kingdom (BPI)	Platinum	600,000^{‡}
^{‡} Sales+streaming figures based on certification alone.

== See also ==
- List of Billboard number-one dance songs of 2012
- List of Billboard number-one dance songs of 2025
