= Ceremonials Tour =

2011–14 concert tour by Florence and the Machine

- World tour by Florence + the Machine
- Location: North America, Europe, Oceania, South America, Asia
- Associated album: Ceremonials
- Start date: 13 October 2011
- End date: 12 December 2012
- No. of shows: 121
- Supporting acts: Laura Marling; Two Door Cinema Club; Cowboy Indian Bear; The Head and the Heart; Mat Kearney; The Horrors; Spector; Theme Park; Alpines; Blood Orange; The Walkmen; The Maccabees; The Weeknd; Snow Patrol; The Temper Trap; Haim; Yna

Florence + the Machine concert chronology
- Lungs Tour (2008–11); Ceremonials Tour (2011–12); How Big, How Blue, How Beautiful Tour (2015–16)

The Ceremonials Tour was the second concert tour by the English indie rock band Florence and the Machine. The tour included performances at music festivals because it is lead singer Florence Welch's favourite way to perform live. Welch had originally planned to spend over a year touring for Ceremonials (their previous tour lasted almost three and a half years) before announcing that the December 2012 dates would be the final performances of the tour.

The Ceremonials Tour was a critical and commercial success. Pollstar announced that it was the 40th best-selling tour in the world in 2012 having earned $31.8 million worldwide and having sold 618,436 tickets. Paste magazine ranked the tour the seventh best tour of 2012.

== Opening acts ==
- Laura Marling – (Chicago Theatre)
- Two Door Cinema Club – (Midland Theatre)
- Cowboy Indian Bear – (Midland Theatre)
- The Head and the Heart – (WaMu Theater)
- Mat Kearney – (WaMu Theater)
- The Horrors – (UK & Ireland March 2012)
- Spector – (UK & Ireland March 2012, excluding 9, 10 March, and mainland Europe)
- Theme Park – (9 March)
- Alpines – 10 March (Alexandra Palace)
- Blood Orange – (Spring North American dates, Australia dates and New Zealand)
- The Walkmen – (Summer North American dates)
- The Maccabees – (Fall North American dates)
- The Weeknd – (Fall North American dates)
- Snow Patrol – (Phoenix Park, co-headlining)
- The Temper Trap – (Phoenix Park)
- Haim – (UK & Ireland December 2012)
- Yna – (Gaston Park)

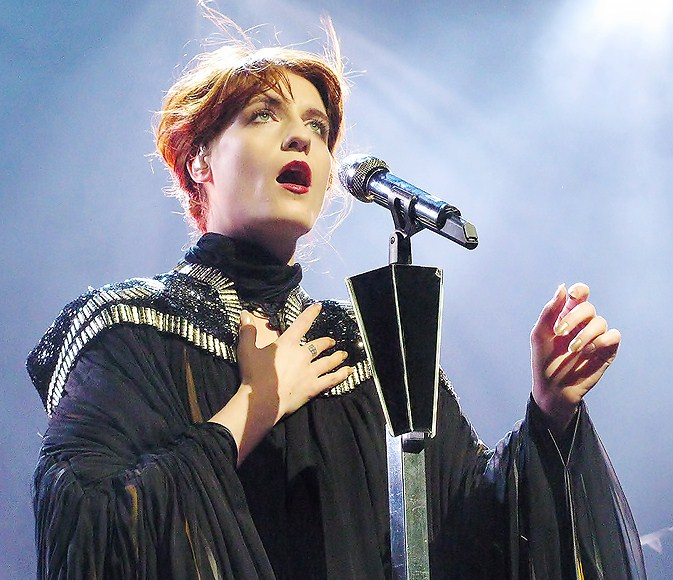
Florence and the Machine's Florence Welch performing at Borgata Event Center in Atlantic City, New Jersey on May 12, 2012 on the Ceremonials tour

== Setlist ==
Summer Soul Festival

The setlist at São Paulo was:

1. "Only If for a Night"
2. "What the Water Gave Me"
3. "Cosmic Love"
4. "You've Got the Love"
5. "Something's Got a Hold on Me"
6. "Never Let Me Go" (acoustic)
7. "Between Two Lungs"
8. "Shake It Out"
9. "Dog Days Are Over"
10. "Rabbit Heart (Raise It Up)"
11. "Spectrum"
12. "No Light, No Light"
UK & Ireland: Leg 1

The main setlist for the first UK & Ireland leg was:

1. "Only If For A Night"
2. "What the Water Gave Me"
3. "Strangeness and Charm" (2, 5, 6 March)
4. "Seven Devils" (4, 8 March)
5. "Cosmic Love"
6. "Between Two Lungs" (played before "Cosmic Love": 16 March)
7. "Shake It Out"
8. "Dog Days Are Over"
9. "Breaking Down"
10. "Drumming Song" (10 March)
11. "Lover to Lover" (9 March)
12. "Heartlines" (Acoustic)
13. "Leave My Body"
14. "All This and Heaven Too" (added to the encore: 8 March; played before "Shake It Out": 12 & 13 March; played before "Leave My Body": 16 March)
15. "You've Got the Love" (added to the encore: 9, 10, 15 & 16 March before "Never Let Me Go")
16. "Rabbit Heart (Raise It Up)"
17. "Spectrum"

Encore:

1. "Never Let Me Go" (played last in the encore 8, 9, 10, 15, 16 March)
2. "No Light, No Light" (played second in the encore after "All This and Heaven Too": 8 March; last song in main set: 9, 10, 15 & 16 March )
Europe: Leg 1

The main setlist for the first European leg was:

1. "Only If For A Night"
2. "What the Water Gave Me"
3. "Cosmic Love"
4. "Between Two Lungs"
5. "All This and Heaven Too" (played before "No Light, No Light" in the encore: 23 March; played before "Lover to Lover": 30 March; not played: 28 March)
6. "Shake It Out"
7. "Dog Days Are Over"
8. "Breaking Down" (not played: 25, 27, 28, 30 March)
9. "Heartlines" (Acoustic) (played before "Cosmic Love": 30 March)
10. "Lover to Lover" (Acoustic) (28, 30 March)
11. "Strangeness and Charm" (28 March)
12. "Leave My Body" (not played: 28 March; played after "Dog Days Are Over": 30 March)
13. "You've Got the Love"
14. "Rabbit Heart (Raise It Up)"
15. "Spectrum"

Encore:

1. "Never Let Me Go" (played before "You've Got the Love": 23 March)
2. "No Light, No Light"
Royal Albert Hall/Sydney Opera House

All songs were played with orchestral and choral backing. The setlist for the Teenage Cancer Trust Concert and at Sydney Opera House was:

1. "You've Got the Love"
2. "Only If For A Night"
3. "Drumming Song"
4. "Heartlines"
5. "Between Two Lungs"
6. "Breaking Down"
7. "Cosmic Love"
8. "All This and Heaven Too"
9. "Leave My Body" (only in Sydney)
10. "Rabbit Heart (Raise It Up)" (only in Sidney)
11. "No Light, No Light
12. "Never Let Me Go" (played after "Dog Days Are Over" in Sydney)
13. "Dog Days Are Over"
14. "Shake It Out"
Sydney Entertainment Centre Concert, 24 May 2012

The setlist at the Sydney Entertainment Centre was:

1. "Only If For A Night"
2. "What the Water Gave Me"
3. "Between Two Lungs"
4. "Cosmic Love"
5. "You've Got the Love"
6. "Rabbit Heart (Raise It Up)"
7. "Spectrum"
8. "Heartlines"
9. "Leave My Body"
10. "Seven Devils"
11. "Shake It Out"
12. "Dog Days Are Over"

Encore:

1. "Never Let Me Go"
2. "No Light, No Light"
T in the Park, 6 July 2012

The setlist at T in the Park was:

1. "Only If For A Night"
2. "What the Water Gave Me"
3. "Between Two Lungs"
4. "You've Got the Love"
5. "Rabbit Heart (Raise It Up)"
6. "Spectrum"
7. "Heartlines"
8. "Leave My Body"
9. "Shake It Out"
10. "Dog Days Are Over"
11. "Never Let Me Go"
12. "No Light, No Light"
Lollapalooza, 5 August 2012

The setlist at Lollapalooza was:

1. "Only If For A Night"
2. "What the Water Gave Me"
3. "Cosmic Love"
4. "Rabbit Heart (Raise It Up)"
5. "Spectrum"
6. "Heartlines"
7. "Leave My Body"
8. "Breath of Life"
9. "Shake It Out"
10. "Dog Days Are Over"
11. "Never Let Me Go"
12. "No Light, No Light"
Bestival, 7 September 2012

The setlist at Bestival was:

1. "Only If For A Night"
2. "What the Water Gave Me"
3. "Drumming Song"
4. "Cosmic Love"
5. "All This and Heaven Too"
6. "Rabbit Heart (Raise It Up)"
7. "Lover to Lover"
8. "You've Got the Love"
9. "Shake It Out"
10. "No Light, No Light"
11. "Spectrum"
12. "Never Let Me Go"
13. "Take Care"
14. "Dog Days Are Over"
Corona Capital 2012, 14 October 2012

The setlist at Corona Capital was:

1. "Only If For A Night"
2. "What the Water Gave Me"
3. "Cosmic Love"
4. "Rabbit Heart (Raise It Up)"
5. "You've Got the Love"
6. "Spectrum"
7. "Heartlines"
8. "Lover to Lover"
9. "Shake It Out"
10. "No Light, No Light"
11. "Dog Days Are Over"
Europe: Leg 2

The setlist at the last European leg (as performed in Milan on 20 November) was:

1. "Only If For A Night"
2. "What the Water Gave Me"
3. "Drumming Song"
4. "Cosmic Love"
5. "All This and Heaven Too"
6. "Rabbit Heart (Raise It Up)"
7. "Lover to Lover"
8. "You've Got the Love"
9. "Heartlines" (Acoustic)
10. "Leave My Body"
11. "Sweet Nothing" (Acoustic)
12. "Spectrum"
13. "No Light, No Light"

Encore:

1. "Shake It Out"
2. "Dog Days Are Over"

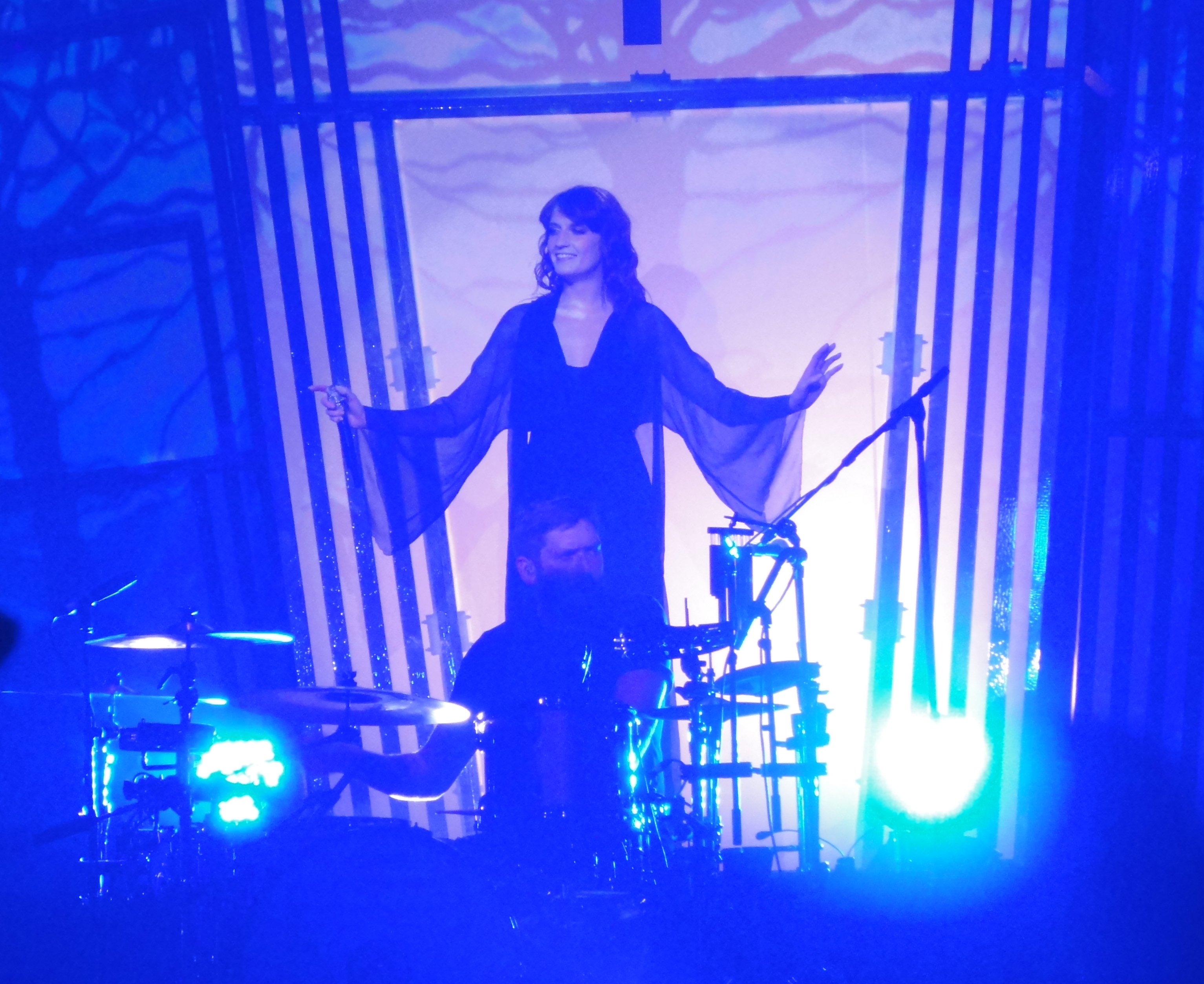
Florence and the Machine performing in Melbourne, Australia on May 20, 2012

UK & Ireland: Leg 2

The main setlist for the second UK & Ireland leg was:

1. "Only If For A Night"
2. "What the Water Gave Me"
3. "Drumming Song"
4. "Cosmic Love"
5. "Bird Song (Intro)"
6. "Rabbit Heart (Raise It Up)"
7. "You've Got the Love"
8. "Lover to Lover"
9. "Oh! Darling" (The Beatles cover) (only in Liverpool)
10. "Heartlines" (Acoustic)
11. "Leave My Body" (Piano version)
12. "Shake It Out"
13. "No Light, No Light"

Encore:

1. "Sweet Nothing" (Acoustic) (not played in Exeter; played after "Leave My Body" in Dublin)
2. "Kiss with a Fist" (only in Dublin)
3. "Spectrum"
4. "Dog Days Are Over"

== Tour dates ==
Date	City	Country	Venue
Festivals and promotional appearances
13 October 2011	New York City	United States	The Boom Boom Room
15 October 2011	Brooklyn	United States	The Creator's Project
25 October 2011	London	England	Hackney Empire
15 November 2011^{[A]}	Sydney	Australia	Seymour Centre
4 December 2011^{[B]}	Chicago	United States	Chicago Theatre
5 December 2011^{[C]}	Kansas City	United States	Midland Theatre
8 December 2011^{[D]}	Seattle	United States	WaMu Theater
9 December 2011^{[E]}	Oakland	United States	Oracle Arena
10 December 2011^{[F]}	San Diego	United States	Valley View Casino Center
11 December 2011^{[G]}	Los Angeles	United States	Gibson Amphitheatre
24 January 2012^{[H]}	São Paulo	Brazil	Anhembi Convention Center
25 January 2012^{[H]}	Rio de Janeiro	Brazil	HSBC Arena
28 January 2012^{[H]}	Florianópolis	Brazil	Stage Music Park
1 February 2012	Tokyo	Japan	Akasaka Blitz
14 February 2012	Eindhoven	Netherlands	Effenaar
Europe
2 March 2012	Dublin	Ireland	The O_{2}
4 March 2012	Bournemouth	England	Bournemouth International Centre
5 March 2012	Cardiff	Wales	Motorpoint Arena Cardiff
6 March 2012	Nottingham	England	Capital FM Arena
8 March 2012	London	England	Alexandra Palace
9 March 2012	London	England	Alexandra Palace
10 March 2012	London	England	Alexandra Palace
12 March 2012	Glasgow	Scotland	Scottish Exhibition and Conference Centre
13 March 2012	Birmingham	England	LG Arena
15 March 2012	Manchester	England	Manchester Arena
16 March 2012	Newcastle	England	Metro Radio Arena
23 March 2012	Munich	Germany	Munich Tonhalle
24 March 2012	Berlin	Germany	Columbiahalle
25 March 2012	Hamburg	Germany	Große Freiheit
27 March 2012	Paris	France	Casino de Paris
28 March 2012	Paris	France	Casino de Paris
30 March 2012	Cologne	Germany	E-Werk
31 March 2012	Brussels	Belgium	Ancienne Belgique
1 April 2012	Amsterdam	Netherlands	Paradiso
3 April 2012^{[I]}	London	England	Royal Albert Hall
North America
14 April 2012	Santa Barbara	United States	Santa Barbara Bowl
15 April 2012^{[J]}	Indio	United States	Empire Polo Club
17 April 2012	Reno	United States	Grand Sierra Resort
18 April 2012	Davis	United States	Mondavi Center
20 April 2012	Phoenix	United States	Comerica Theatre
21 April 2012	Las Vegas	United States	Cosmopolitan of Las Vegas
22 April 2012^{[J]}	Indio	United States	Empire Polo Club
27 April 2012	Minneapolis	United States	Minneapolis State Theatre
28 April 2012	Milwaukee	United States	Eagles Ballroom
29 April 2012	St. Louis	United States	Peabody Opera House
1 May 2012	Dallas	United States	Palladium Ballroom
2 May 2012	Houston	United States	Bayou Music Center
3 May 2012^{[K]}	New Orleans	United States	Fair Grounds Race Course
4 May 2012^{[L]}	Memphis	United States	Tom Lee Park
8 May 2012	New York City	United States	Radio City Music Hall
11 May 2012	Uncasville	United States	Mohegan Sun Arena
12 May 2012	Atlantic City	United States	Borgata Events Center
Oceania
17 May 2012	Perth	Australia	Burswood Dome
20 May 2012	Melbourne	Australia	Rod Laver Arena
22 May 2012	Adelaide	Australia	Adelaide Entertainment Centre
24 May 2012	Sydney	Australia	Sydney Entertainment Centre
25 May 2012^{[M]}	Sydney	Australia	Sydney Opera House
26 May 2012	Brisbane	Australia	Riverstage
28 May 2012	Auckland	New Zealand	Vector Arena
Europe
22 June 2012^{[N]}	Scheeßel	Germany	Eichenring Scheeßel
23 June 2012^{[O]}	Tuttlingen	Germany	Neuhausen Ob Eck
24 June 2012^{[P]}	London	England	Hackney Marshes
29 June 2012^{[Q]}	St Gallen	Switzerland	Gallen Festival Grounds
30 June 2012^{[R]}	Arras	France	Citadelle Vauban
1 July 2012^{[S]}	Werchter	Belgium	Werchter Festival Grounds
6 July 2012^{[U]}	Kinross	Scotland	Balado Airfield
8 July 2012	Dublin	Ireland	Phoenix Park
North America
20 July 2012	Burnaby	Canada	Deer Lake Park
21 July 2012	Auburn	United States	White River Amphitheatre
22 July 2012	Troutdale	United States	Edgefield Amphitheater
25 July 2012	Morrison	United States	Red Rocks Amphitheatre
26 July 2012	Denver	United States	Wells Fargo Theater
29 July 2012	Indianapolis	United States	White River State Park
30 July 2012	Cleveland	United States	Jacobs Pavilion at Nautica
31 July 2012	Detroit	United States	Fox Theatre
2 August 2012	Toronto	Canada	Molson Canadian Amphitheatre
3 August 2012^{[Y]}	Montreal	Canada	Parc Jean-Drapeau
5 August 2012^{[Z]}	Chicago	United States	Grant Park
Europe
8 August 2012^{[AA]}	Oslo	Norway	Middelalderparken
9 August 2012^{[AB]}	Gothenburg	Sweden	Slottsskogen
22 August 2012	Belfast	Northern Ireland	Boucher Playing Fields
25 August 2012^{[AC]}	Reading	England	Little John's Farm
26 August 2012^{[AC]}	Leeds	England	Bramham Park
7 September 2012^{[AG]}	Isle of Wight	England	Robin Hill Country Park
North America
14 September 2012	Mansfield	United States	Comcast Center
15 September 2012	Wantagh	United States	Nikon at Jones Beach Theater
16 September 2012	Saratoga	United States	Saratoga Performing Arts Center
18 September 2012	Camden	United States	Susquehanna Bank Center
19 September 2012	Columbia	United States	Merriweather Post Pavilion
21 September 2012	Raleigh	United States	Raleigh Amphitheater and Festival Site
22 September 2012^{[AF]}	Atlanta	United States	Piedmont Park
23 September 2012^{[AD]}	Pensacola	United States	Pensacola Beach
25 September 2012	Tampa Bay	United States	USF Sun Dome
26 September 2012	Sunrise	United States	BankAtlantic Center
29 September 2012	The Woodlands	United States	Cynthia Woods Mitchell Pavilion
30 September 2012	Dallas	United States	Gexa Energy Pavilion
1 October 2012	Kansas City	United States	Starlight Theatre
4 October 2012	Chula Vista	United States	Cricket Wireless Amphitheatre
5 October 2012	Mountain View	United States	Shoreline Amphitheatre
7 October 2012	Los Angeles	United States	Hollywood Bowl
8 October 2012	Los Angeles	United States	Hollywood Bowl
10 October 2012	Albuquerque	United States	The Pavilion
12 October 2012^{[AE]}	Austin	United States	Zilker Park
14 October 2012 ^{[AH]}	Mexico City	Mexico	Foro Sol
Europe
8 November 2012^{[AI]}	London	England	Rivoli Ballroom
20 November 2012	Milan	Italy	Mediolanum Forum
21 November 2012	Winterthur	Switzerland	Eishalle Deutweg
22 November 2012	Munich	Germany	Zenith
24 November 2012	Amsterdam	Netherlands	Heineken Music Hall
25 November 2012	Antwerp	Belgium	Lotto Arena
27 November 2012	Paris	France	Zénith de Paris
28 November 2012	Esch	Luxembourg	Rockhal
30 November 2012	Düsseldorf	Germany	Mitsubishi Electric Halle
1 December 2012	Berlin	Germany	Treptow Arena
2 December 2012	Frankfurt	Germany	Jahrhunderthalle
4 December 2012	Exeter	England	Westpoint
5 December 2012	London	England	The O_{2} Arena
6 December 2012	London	England	The O_{2} Arena
8 December 2012	Coventry	England	Ricoh Arena
9 December 2012	Aberdeen	Scotland	Aberdeen Exhibition and Conference Centre
10 December 2012	Liverpool	England	Echo Arena
12 December 2012	Dublin	Ireland	The O_{2}

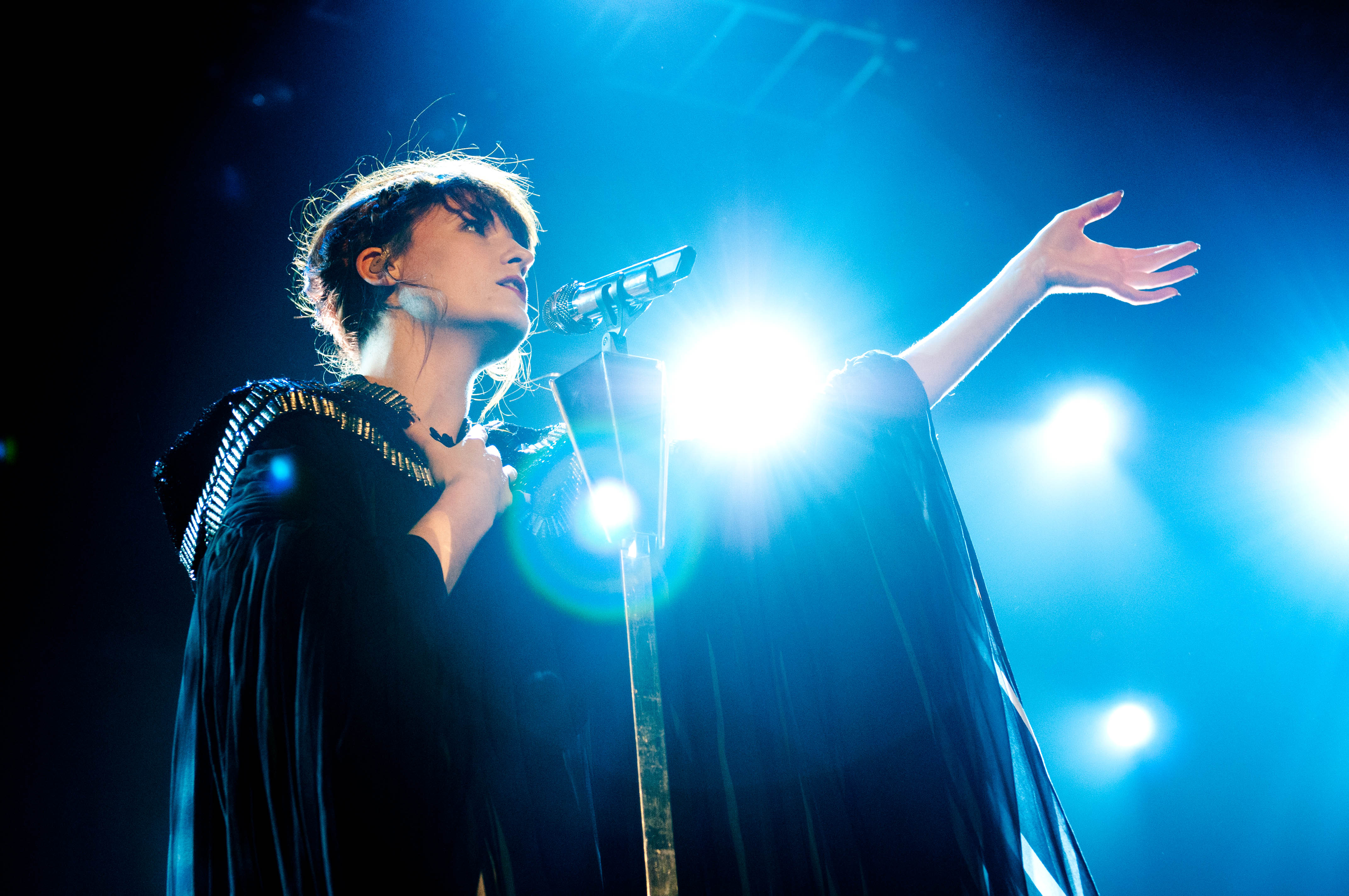
The tour stop in Auckland, New Zealand on May 28, 2012

Festivals and other miscellaneous performances

^{A} This concert was a part of "MasterCard Priceless Music Series"
^{B} This concert was a part of "93XRT Holiday Concert"
^{C} This concert was a part of "The Nite The Buzz Stole XMAS"
^{D} This concert was a part of "KMTT's Winter Warmth"
^{E} This concert was a part of "Live 105's Not So Silent Night"
^{F} This concert was a part of "91X Wrex The Halls Night"
^{G} This concert was a part of "22nd Annual KROQ Almost Acoustic Christmas"
^{H} This concert was a part of "Summer Soul Festival"
^{I} This concert was a part of "Teenage Cancer Trust Concert 2012"
^{J} This concert was a part of "Coachella Valley Music and Arts Festival"
^{K} This concert was a part of "New Orleans Jazz & Heritage Festival"
^{L} This concert was a part of "Beale Street Music Festival"
^{M} This concert was a part of "Vivid Sydney Festival"
^{N} This concert was a part of "Hurricane Festival"
^{O} This concert was a part of "Southside Festival"
^{P} This concert was a part of "BBC Radio One's Hackney Weekend"
^{Q} This concert was a part of "Openair St Gallen Festival"
^{R} This concert was a part of "Main Square Festival"

^{S} This concert was a part of "Rock Werchter"
^{T} This concert was a part of "Open'er Festival"
^{U} This concert was a part of "T in the Park"
^{V} This concert was a part of "Rock in Rio"
^{W} This concert was a part of "Sandance 2013"
^{X} This concert was a part of "The Sound of Change Live" concert
^{Y} This concert was a part of "Osheaga 2012"
^{Z} This concert was a part of "Lollapalooza"
^{AA} This concert was a part of "Øyafestivalen"
^{AB} This concert was a part of "Way Out West Festival"
^{AC} This concert was a part of "Reading and Leeds Festivals"
^{AD} This concert was a part of "Deluna Festival"
^{AE} This concert was a part of "Austin City Limits Festival"
^{AF} This concert was a part of "Music Midtown 2012"
^{AG} This concert was a part of "Bestival"
^{AH} This concert was a part of the "Corona Capital Festival"
^{AI} This concert was a part of "Radio 2 in Concert" series and broadcast on BBC Red Button.
^{AJ} This concert was a part of the "Coke Live Music Festival 2013"
^{AK} This concert is a part of the "Orange Warsaw Festival 2014"

== Background and reception ==
Florence and the Machine played their first performance in support of Ceremonials at New York City's The Boom Boom Room. The performance was sponsored by Interview Magazine, which Florence Welch appeared on the October 2011 cover of.

The band played at the Seymour Centre in Sydney, Australia in November where Florence performed in a Jason Wu Fall 2011 dress. The Daily Telegraph reported that the Seymour Centre show was sold-out and called the performance "wonderful" and "another awesome music memory".

== Selected box office score data ==
Venue	City	Tickets sold / available	Gross revenue
Chicago Theatre	Chicago	3,087 / 3,087 (100%)	$145,089
The O2	Dublin	12,488 / 12,488 (100%)	$598,146
Manchester Arena	Manchester	15,716 / 16,255 (96%)	$727,423
Santa Barbara Bowl	Santa Barbara	4,971 / 4,971 (100%)	$218,944
Grand Sierra Resort	Reno	1,887 / 1,887 (100%)	$66,045
Mondavi Center for the Performing Arts	Davis	1,708 / 1,708 (100%)	$72,590
State Theatre	Minneapolis	2,058 / 2,058 (100%)	$98,961
Radio City Music Hall	New York City	5,780 / 5,961 (96%)	$340,915
Mohegan Sun Arena	Uncasville	5,489 / 6,032 (90%)	$271,706
Burswood Dome	Perth	12,294 / 12,946 (95%)	$948,518
Rod Laver Arena	Melbourne	12,897 / 12,897 (100%)	$1,029,120
Entertainment Centre	Adelaide	7,813 / 8,044 (97%)	$631,659
Entertainment Centre	Sydney	12,131 / 12,472 (97%)	$944,259
River Stage	Brisbane	8,829 / 9,000 (98%)	$710,662
Vector Arena	Auckland	11,525 / 11,559 (99%)	$615,240
Lotto Arena	Antwerp	7,341 / 7,347 (~100%)	$274,498
TOTAL		126,014 / 128,712 (98%)	$7,693,775
