= Ceremonials =

Studio album by Florence and the Machine
- Released: 28 October 2011
- Recorded: 2010–2011
- Studio: Abbey Road and Wolf Tone, London
- Genre: Baroque pop; art pop; indie pop; neo soul; power pop; gothic pop
- Length: 55:58
- Label: Island
- Producer: Paul Epworth; James Ford; Charlie Hugall; Ben Roulston; Isabella Summers; Eg White

Florence and the Machine chronology
Live at the Wiltern (2011)	Ceremonials (2011)	MTV Unplugged (2012)

Singles from Ceremonials
- 1. "Shake It Out" Released: 14 September 2011; 2. "No Light, No Light" Released: 16 January 2012; 3. "Never Let Me Go" Released: 30 March 2012; 4. "Spectrum (Say My Name)" Released: 5 July 2012; 5. "Lover to Lover" Released: 30 November 2012

Ceremonials is the second studio album by English indie rock band Florence and the Machine. It was released on 28 October 2011 by Island Records. The band started working on the album in 2010 and finished it in 2011. The standard edition of the album was entirely produced by Paul Epworth, who also worked prominently on the band's debut album Lungs (2009).

Ceremonials received generally positive reviews from music critics, who drew comparisons to artists such as Kate Bush, while also praising the instrumentation, Florence Welch's vocals and the production of the songs. It appeared on several year-end critics' lists in late 2011. At the 55th Annual Grammy Awards, the album received a nomination for Best Pop Vocal Album, while "Shake It Out" was nominated for Best Pop Duo/Group Performance. Ceremonials debuted at number one on the UK Albums Chart, becoming the band's second consecutive number-one album. It also debuted at number one in Australia, Ireland and New Zealand, and peaked at number six on the US Billboard 200, becoming the band's first top-10 album in the United States. It has sold 2 million copies worldwide.

Five singles were released from Ceremonials. "What the Water Gave Me" was released on 23 August 2011 as a teaser for the album. "Shake It Out" was released on 30 September 2011 as the album's official lead single, becoming one of the band's most commercially successful singles to date. "No Light, No Light" was released on 16 January 2012 as the second single from the album, and "Never Let Me Go" was released on 30 March 2012. "Spectrum (Say My Name)" was released on 5 July 2012, and fuelled by a remix by Scottish DJ Calvin Harris, became Florence and the Machine's first number-one single in the UK. The album's fifth and final single, "Lover to Lover", was released on 30 November 2012. Ceremonials was also promoted by the band by a worldwide tour, the Ceremonials Tour (2011–12). The album's sound is described as baroque pop, art pop, indie pop, neo soul, power pop and gothic pop.

== Background ==
NME magazine confirmed that after the release of the song "Heavy in Your Arms" for the soundtrack to The Twilight Saga: Eclipse (2010), lead singer Florence Welch entered the studio for a two-week session to record with producer Paul Epworth, with whom she worked on the band's debut album, Lungs (2009). She said that the two recordings that came out of that session were inspired by science because "a lot of her family are doctors or trying to become doctors, so much of her conversations are fixated on medical stuff." In an interview with the Gibson website on 17 February 2011, guitarist Rob Ackroyd stated, "Work on the second album has begun with Paul Epworth and there is talk of booking out Abbey Road for a month in April/May to record." In June 2011, Epworth told BBC 6 Music that the album would probably be finished "by the end of July" and described the sound as "a lot less indie and lot more soulful". He also indicated that there were 16 songs up for inclusion on the album, but that this would be reduced upon the time of release. Pitchfork confirmed on 23 August 2011 that the album was produced solely by Epworth. On 12 September 2011, Canadian radio broadcaster Alan Cross revealed that Florence and the Machine's second album would be titled Ceremonials. He also commented on the album by saying, "I've heard a little more than half the record and it is big, soulful and powerful. Think Adele or Tori Amos but with some serious Kate Bush DNA, especially with the rhythm section."

Regarding the album's title, Welch told MTV News, "It was an art installation done in the '70s, this video piece all done on Super 8, this big procession of kind of coquette-style hippies and all these different colored robes and masks, and it was all to do with color, really saturated, brightly colored pastas and balloons. I saw it a couple years ago, and it was called 'Ceremonials' and then, like, Roman numerals after it. And the word sort of stuck with me, and I think the whole idea of performance, and kind of putting on this outfit and going out almost to find some sort of exorcism or absolution, to kind of get outside yourself, there's a sense of ceremony to it." Welch also revealed that she wanted to call the album Violence, stating, "I wanted to make an album that sounded like the soundtrack to Baz Luhrmann's Romeo + Juliet, the violence mixed with the classical Shakespearean drama mixed with the pop and the pulp, extreme neon stuff." In an interview with The Guardian, she described the album as "much bigger" and categorised its genre as "chamber soul", a mixture of chamber pop and soul. The liner notes of Ceremonials contain an essay by English writer Emma Forrest, dated 21 September 2011.

== Promotion ==
The song "Strangeness and Charm"—which was ultimately included on the deluxe edition of Ceremonials—was debuted on 2 May 2010 at the Olympia Theatre in Dublin, Ireland, during the band's Cosmic Love Tour. The song was later recorded live at the Hammersmith Apollo on another stop of The Cosmic Love Tour and was included on the re-release of Lungs, titled Between Two Lungs, along with other live tracks and previously unreleased B-sides. Welch describes the song as "about seven minutes long and pretty relentless" and also "dancey, but it's also dark as well", featuring "relentless drums and heavy, droning bass." During their North American tour, Florence and the Machine debuted "What the Water Gave Me" at the Greek Theatre in Berkeley, California, on 12 June 2011. On 23 August 2011, the song was released as a promotional single from the album, along with an accompanying music video.

Florence and the Machine embarked on several live performances to promote Ceremonials. The band premiered four tracks from the album—"Only If For A Night", "Never Let Me Go", "Heartlines" and "Spectrum"—at The Creators Project, a partnership between Vice and Intel, in Brooklyn's Dumbo neighbourhood on 15 October 2011. They launched the album with an exclusive gig at the Hackney Empire in London on 25 October, which was live-streamed on The Guardian website. On 1 November, they performed "What the Water Gave Me" and "No Light, No Light" on the British music television show Later... with Jools Holland. On 6 November, the band made their first appearance on The X Factor, where they performed "Shake It Out" on the double elimination results show. "Shake It Out" was also performed on the Irish late-night talk show The Late Late Show (28 October), The X Factor Australia (15 November) and Good Morning America (21 November).

They performed "Shake It Out" and "What the Water Gave Me" on the Canal+ show La Musicale in France on 18 November. The following day, Florence and the Machine appeared on the American sketch comedy show Saturday Night Live for the second time, performing "Shake It Out" and "No Light, No Light". The group stopped by BBC Radio 1 on 25 November for a special Live Lounge set, which included performances of "Shake It Out", "What the Water Gave Me", "Rabbit Heart (Raise It Up)", "Dog Days Are Over" and "No Light, No Light", as well as a cover of "Take Care" by Drake featuring Rihanna. They performed "Spectrum" on The X Factor USA semi-final results show on 15 December. The band performed at the Los Angeles portion of Dick Clark's New Year's Rockin' Eve with Ryan Seacrest, which was broadcast live on 31 December on ABC. The band performed "No Light, No Light" at the 2012 Brit Awards at the O2 Arena in on 21 February 2012. On 2 July 2012, a music video for "Breaking Down" was officially released.

“Seven Devils” was played in trailers for Game of Thrones, Beautiful Creatures, 2 Guns, and Agatha All Along.

=== Singles ===
"What the Water Gave Me" was released on 23 August 2011 as the first taster of Ceremonials. The promotional single debuted at number 24 on the UK Singles Chart. It saw moderate chart success elsewhere, reaching number 13 in Ireland, number 15 in New Zealand and number 35 in Australia.

"Shake It Out" was released as the album's official lead single on 30 September 2011. It premiered exclusively on XFM London on 14 September 2011. The song peaked at number 12 on the UK Singles Chart, becoming Florence and the Machine's fourth top-20 single. Internationally, it reached number two on the Irish Singles Chart, while charting inside the top 20 in Austria, New Zealand and Norway, the top 30 in Germany and Switzerland, the top 40 in Australia, and the top 50 in Sweden.

"No Light, No Light" was released on 13 January 2012 as the second single from the album. The single reached number 63 on the UK Singles Chart. The accompanying video, released on 18 November 2011, caused controversy after it was accused of racism due to its perceived use of blackface by an actor in the video, and was also criticised for its depiction of voodoo.

"Never Let Me Go" was released on 30 March 2012 as the third single from the album. The music video was released on 7 March 2012. The track charted at number 82 in the UK, while reaching number three in Australia, the band's highest-peaking single in that country to date.

A remix of "Spectrum" by Scottish DJ and producer Calvin Harris, subtitled "Say My Name", was released on 5 July 2012 as the album's fourth single. It became the band's first number-one single in both the UK and Ireland.

"Lover to Lover" was released as the fifth and final single from the album on 30 November 2012. Directed by Vincent Haycock, the music video debuted on 19 November and features a new single version of the song.

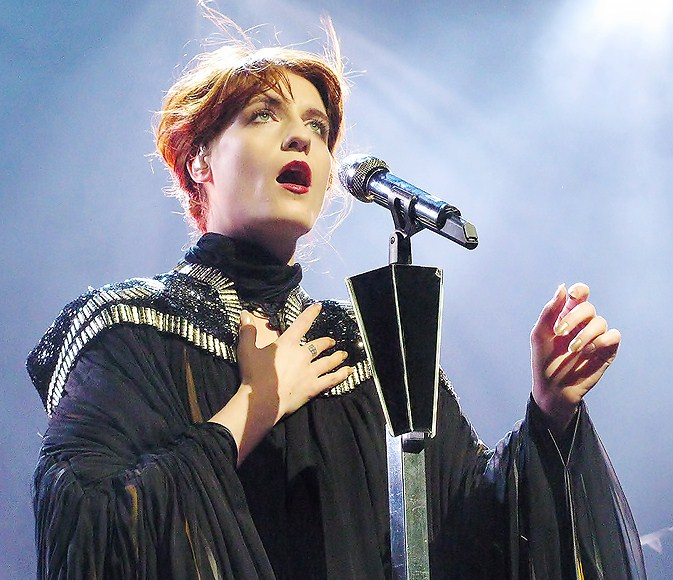
Florence and the Machine performing in May 2012 on the Ceremonials Tour

=== Tour ===
To promote the album, Florence and the Machine embarked on their second worldwide tour titled the Ceremonials Tour on 13 October 2011. The set list includes songs from the band's two studio albums. The tour included numerous performances at music festivals as that is Welch's favourite way to perform live. During an interview with MTV News, Welch discussed the nature of the tour, saying, "In a way, it's not going to be too big a production; we've done a lot of quite extravagant stuff, and that's been amazing, but for this tour, it's definitely going to be about showcasing the music [...] The songs are going to be the most important thing. It will be heavily based on the music [...] no bells and whistles just yet, we're going to try and keep it quite pure." The tour ended in December 2012, after two years of worldwide touring.

== Critical reception ==
Professional ratings
Aggregate scores
Source	Rating
AnyDecentMusic?	7.2/10
Metacritic	75/100
Review scores
Source	Rating
AllMusic	5/5 stars
The Daily Telegraph	4/5 stars
Entertainment Weekly	A
The Guardian	3/5 stars
The Independent	3/5 stars
Los Angeles Times	3.5/4 stars
NME	8/10
Pitchfork	6.0/10
Rolling Stone	4/5 stars
Spin	8/10

Ceremonials received generally positive reviews from music critics. At Metacritic, which assigns a weighted mean rating out of 100 to reviews from mainstream critics, the album received an average score of 75, based on 36 reviews. Laura Foster of Clash called the album a "confident, cohesive effort" and found that "[t]he steady hand of Paul Epworth on production has helped Florence to take the winning formula of her distinctive vocals and melodies, the twinkling harps and thundering drums, and augment it with string arrangements, subtle electro touches, and gospel choirs." Entertainment Weekly's Kyle Anderson praised it as a "confident, unflinching tour de force" and commented, "If her acclaimed 2009 debut, Lungs, was a scrappy shrine to survival and empowerment, its follow-up is a baroque cathedral, bedecked with ornate tapestries made of ghostly choirs, pagan-rhythmic splendor, and a whole lot of harp." AllMusic critic James Christopher Monger wrote, "Bigger and bolder than 2009's excellent Lungs, Ceremonials rolls in like fog over the Thames, doling out a heavy-handed mix of Brit-pop-infused neo-soul anthems and lush, movie trailer-ready ballads that fuse the bluesy, electro-despair of Adele with the ornate, gothic melodrama of Kate Bush and Floodland-era Sisters of Mercy." Margaret Wappler of the Los Angeles Times found that Welch had "found a way to honor her Bjorkian appetites for lavish orchestral spectacle while finding the depth and subtlety of her voice".

Barry Nicolson of NME noted that "by taking what worked about Lungs and amplifying those qualities to a natural, satisfying conclusion, Florence has made a near-great pop record that should afford her the creative freedom to do whatever the hell she wants next time around." Rolling Stone writer Jody Rosen commented that the album contains "turbulent ballads, powered by booming drums and vocal chorales rising like distant thunder, full of Welch's banshee wails. The music touches on Celtic melodies, bluesy rock stomps, nods to goth and gospel." The Daily Telegraph's Neil McCormick viewed Ceremonials as "a giant, fluid, emotionally resonant album" and stated, "Contrary to the name she has given her band, the Machine feel organic and human, providing an epic, full-blooded soundtrack to Welch's voodoo, in which rhythm, melody and chanting are employed to drive out neuroses and insecurities, characterised as ghosts and devils." Rob Harvilla of Spin described Welch as "a bloodied, bloodying songbird in a gilded cage of immaculately crafted, slow-burn, chest-beating empowerment anthems, gripping steel bars that her elegantly volcanic voice could shred at any moment", adding, "She's so much better than her material that her material is rendered immaterial."

Michael Hann of The Guardian concluded that the album "always sounds wonderful—producer Paul Epworth has created a warm, soft, four-poster featherbed of sound for Welch to emote over—but it never really satisfies. One yearns for Welch's wonderful voice to be delivering lines of more import than the nonsense she's often delivering here." In a mixed review, Slant Magazine's Matthew Cole wrote that "[t]he first four tracks of Ceremonials are essentially flawless", but felt that the album "can't help but get weaker as it continues, a fact which owes less to the quality of the songwriting than to the album's length [...] and a far less dynamic second act." Andy Gill of The Independent expressed, "[I]n cementing one style, some of the possibilities offered by Lungs have been choked off. The only time [Welch] and The Machine stray from the formula is the Krautrock-disco motorik of 'Spectrum'; elsewhere, declamatory piano chords and burring organ underpin the banked, soaring vocals that are her trademark". Pitchfork's Ryan Dombal argued, "Instead of Lungs' largely charming yet discombobulating diversity, Ceremonials suffers from a repetitiveness that's akin to looking at a skyline filled with 100-story behemoths lined-up one after the other, blocking out everything but their own size."

=== Accolades ===
Ceremonials was named the best album of 2011 by Q magazine. Time magazine ranked it as the second best album of 2011, being behind Adele's 21, stating, "Despite her penchant for emotive gloom, Welch's tales of heartache can be oddly uplifting; when she sings about darkness and demons, we know she will ultimately conquer them." Entertainment Weekly, on its list of the 10 Best Albums of 2011, listed the album at number five and wrote, "A big believer in Red Sea-parting melodrama, she's got the orchestral grandeur to pull it off. Of course, it helps that she attacks the harp as if she were wielding an ax." Billboard placed it at number eight on its list of the 10 Best Albums of 2011, noting that "Shake It Out" and "What the Water Gave Me" "possess an anthemic quality, but they're far from the only epic moments on the rock-tinged record, which finds Welch channeling avant-pop luminaries like Annie Lennox and Kate Bush." Slant Magazine included Ceremonials at number 22 on its list of The 25 Best Albums of 2011, commenting that the album is "steeped in melodrama, with pump organs, choirs, and strings expertly deployed as pure pomp on already rousing singles like 'Shake It Out' and 'No Light, No Light.' But Welch is perfectly capable of doing delicate too, as evidenced by the gorgeously textured lead single 'What the Water Gave Me' and 'Never Let Me Go,' while tracks like "Lover to Lover" are reminiscent of the Eurythmics at their most soulful." PopMatters ranked the album at number 25 on its list of The 75 Best Albums of 2011, calling it "an expansive album, haunted by tragedy but boldly offering a comforting embrace in reply."

The A.V. Club named it the 26th best album of 2011 and claimed, "A perfect blend of majestic and morose, Ceremonials establishes Welch as one of the most boundary-pushing divas in the business." Rolling Stone ranked the album at number 27 on its list of the 50 Best Albums of 2011, adding, "From 'Shake It Out' to the arena-scale Motown of 'Lover to Lover', Big Red brings it again and again, choirs and string players backing a voice that soars so high, it makes them seem like ants on the ground below." Clash, on its list of The Top 40 Albums of 2011, included Ceremonials at number 28 and opined that the album "heralded the triumphant return of one of Britain's most exciting pop stars. Bettering the sound she first developed on Lungs, the only problem she faces now is deciding which of its massive songs to release as singles." The NME placed the album at number 31 on its list of the 50 Best Albums of 2011, writing that the album "amounted to pop in its purest sense, as something grand and strange and with ambitions higher than mere humanity, as the triple-headed priestess-muse Florence depicted on its sleeve suggested."

The album earned the band nominations for British Female Solo Artist and MasterCard British Album of the Year at the 2012 Brit Awards. The following year at the 55th Annual Grammy Awards, Ceremonials received a nomination for Best Pop Vocal Album, and "Shake It Out" was nominated for Best Pop Duo/Group Performance.

== Artwork ==
The cover artwork for Ceremonials was photographed by Florence and the Machine's longtime collaborator Tom Beard. In November 2019, it was announced that Beard's portrait of Welch for the album cover would be on permanent display at the National Portrait Gallery (NPG) of London in their New Acquisitions exhibition. According to the NPG, the portrait "signalled a new, sleeker aesthetic for Welch, inspired by Art Deco and early-twentieth-century fashion illustration."

== Commercial performance ==
Ceremonials debuted at number one on the UK Albums Chart, selling approximately 38,000 copies in its first two days of release and 94,050 copies altogether in its first week. It fell to number three the following week, selling 58,278 copies. On 18 January 2013, Ceremonials was certified double platinum by the British Phonographic Industry (BPI), and by June 2015, it had sold 715,275 copies in the United Kingdom.

The album also debuted at number one in Australia, Ireland and New Zealand, and was certified gold by the Australian Recording Industry Association (ARIA) in its first week of sales. It was ultimately certified quadruple platinum by the ARIA in 2023, signalling sales of 280,000 equivalent units. Selling 105,000 units in its opening week in the United States, Ceremonials entered the Billboard 200 at number six, while debuting atop the Alternative Albums, Rock Albums and Digital Albums charts. The album was certified platinum by the Recording Industry Association of America (RIAA) on 8 January 2015, and had sold 1,002,000 copies in the US by March 2015. As of May 2012, Ceremonials had sold 2 million copies worldwide.

== Track listing ==
Ceremonials track listing
No.	Title	Writer(s)	Producer	Length
1.	"Only If For A Night"	Florence Welch; Paul Epworth	Epworth	4:58
2.	"Shake It Out"	Welch; Epworth	Epworth	4:37
3.	"What the Water Gave Me"	Welch; Francis White	Epworth	5:33
4.	"Never Let Me Go"	Welch; Epworth	Epworth	4:31
5.	"Breaking Down"	Welch	Epworth	3:49
6.	"Lover to Lover"	Welch; White	Epworth	4:02
7.	"No Light, No Light"	Welch; Isabella Summers	Epworth	4:34
8.	"Seven Devils"	Welch; Epworth	Epworth	5:03
9.	"Heartlines"	Welch; Epworth	Epworth	5:01
10.	"Spectrum"	Welch; Epworth	Epworth	5:11
11.	"All This and Heaven Too"	Welch; Summers	Epworth	4:05
12.	"Leave My Body"	Welch; Epworth	Epworth	4:34

2012 digital deluxe edition bonus tracks
No.	Title	Writer(s)	Producer(s)	Length
13.	"Spectrum (Say My Name)" (Calvin Harris Remix)	Welch; Epworth	Epworth; Harris^{[b]}	3:38
14.	"Breath of Life"	Welch; Summers	Summers	4:08
15.	"Take Care" (BBC Live at Maida Vale)	Herb Wiener; Seymour Gottlieb; John Gluck; Wally Gold; Aubrey Graham; Noah Shebib; Anthony Palman; James Smith; Brook Benton		4:38
16.	"Remain Nameless"	Welch; Summers	Summers; Roulston^{[a]}	4:01
17.	"Strangeness and Charm"	Welch; Epworth	Epworth	5:16
18.	"Bedroom Hymns"	Welch; Ghost	Epworth	3:02
19.	"What the Water Gave Me" (demo)	Welch; White	White	3:53
20.	"Landscape" (demo)	Welch; James Ford	Ford	4:02
21.	"Heartlines" (acoustic)	Welch; Epworth	Charlie Hugall	5:32
22.	"Shake It Out" (acoustic)	Welch; Epworth	Hugall	4:12
23.	"Breaking Down" (acoustic)	Welch	Hugall	3:31
24.	"What the Water Gave Me" (video)			5:33

US deluxe edition and Japanese edition bonus tracks
No.	Title	Length
13.	"Remain Nameless"	4:01
14.	"Strangeness and Charm"	5:16
15.	"Bedroom Hymns"	3:02
16.	"What the Water Gave Me" (demo)	3:53

Non-US deluxe edition bonus disc
No.	Title	Length
1.	"Remain Nameless"	4:01
2.	"Strangeness and Charm"	5:16
3.	"Bedroom Hymns"	3:02
4.	"What the Water Gave Me" (demo)	3:53
5.	"Landscape" (demo)	4:02
6.	"Heartlines" (acoustic)	5:32
7.	"Shake It Out" (acoustic)	4:12
8.	"Breaking Down" (acoustic)	3:31
9.	"What the Water Gave Me" (iTunes Store bonus video)	5:33

Notes

- ^{^a} signifies an additional producer
- ^{^b} signifies a remixer

== Personnel ==
Credits adapted from the liner notes of the deluxe edition of Ceremonials.

Florence and the Machine

- Florence Welch – vocals
- Robert Ackroyd – guitar (track 3)
- Christopher Lloyd Hayden – drums (tracks 1–12); backing vocals (tracks 1–4, 7–10); percussion (tracks 2, 3)
- Tom Monger – harp (all tracks); bass (track 8)
- Mark Saunders – backing vocals (tracks 1–4, 7–9); percussion (tracks 1–3, 7, 9); bass (tracks 3, 4, 7, 9, 11, 12); additional guitar (track 11)
- Isabella Summers – piano (tracks 6, 7, 11); drum programming (tracks 7, 11); strings, choir parts (track 7); synth (track 8); celeste, programming (track 11)

Additional musicians

- Jack Peñate – backing vocals (tracks 1–4, 7–9)
- Sian Alice – backing vocals (tracks 1–4, 7–9)
- Lisa Moorish – backing vocals (tracks 1–4, 7–9)
- Jessie Ware – backing vocals (tracks 1–4, 7–9)
- Rusty Bradshaw – keyboards (tracks 1–5, 7–10, 12); Hammond organ (track 6)
- Sally Herbert – violin, string arrangements (tracks 1, 5, 7, 8, 10, 11)
- Rick Koster – violin (tracks 1, 5, 7, 8, 10, 11)
- Oli Langford – violin (tracks 1, 5, 7, 8, 10, 11)
- Gillon Cameron – violin (tracks 1, 5, 7, 8, 10, 11)
- Warren Zielinski – violin (tracks 1, 5, 7, 8, 10, 11)
- Richard George – violin (tracks 1, 5, 7, 8, 10, 11)
- Ian Burdge – cello (tracks 1, 5, 7, 8, 10, 11)
- Max Baillie – viola (tracks 1, 5, 7, 8, 10, 11)
- Lucy Shaw – double bass (track 1)
- Bullion – drum programming, additional esoteric sonics (tracks 1, 2, 4, 5, 9)
- Paul Epworth – pump organ (track 2)
- Nikolaj Torp Larsen – piano (tracks 6, 10)

Technical

- Paul Epworth – production
- Mark Rankin – engineering (all tracks); mixing (track 11)
- Ted Jensen – mastering
- Tom Elmhirst – mixing (tracks 1, 4–6, 9, 10)
- Ben Baptie – mixing assistance (tracks 1, 4–6, 9, 10)
- Mark "Spike" Stent – mixing (tracks 2, 7)
- Matty Green – mixing assistance (tracks 2, 7)
- Craig Silvey – mixing (tracks 3, 8, 12)
- Bryan Wilson – mixing assistance (tracks 3, 8, 12)
- Isabella Summers – additional backing vocals recording (tracks 7, 11)
- Ben Roulston – additional backing vocals recording (track 7)
- Peter Hutchings – engineering assistance
- Joseph Hartwell Jones – engineering assistance
- Henrik Michelsen – additional engineering assistance

Artwork

- Tabitha Denholm – art direction
- Tom Beard – photography
- Bravo Charlie Mike Hotel – layouts
- Emma Forrest – liner notes

=== Deluxe edition bonus disc ===
Florence and the Machine

- Florence Welch – vocals (all tracks); bass (track 1)
- Isabella Summers – synth (tracks 1, 2); bass, programmed drums, bells (track 1)
- Robert Ackroyd – guitar (tracks 1–3, 6–8)
- Tom Monger – harp (tracks 1–3, 6–8)
- Christopher Lloyd Hayden – drums (tracks 2, 3); percussion (tracks 2, 6–8); backing vocals (track 7)
- Mark Saunders – percussion (track 2); bass (tracks 2, 3)

Additional musicians

- Sam Paul Evans – drums (track 1)
- Rusty Bradshaw – keyboards (tracks 1, 3); backing vocals (track 7); piano (track 8)
- Bullion – drum programming, additional esoteric sonics (track 2)
- Eg White – all instruments (track 4)

Technical

- Isabella Summers – production (track 1)
- Ben Roulston – additional production, engineering (track 1)
- Austen Jux Chandler – engineering (track 1)
- Paul Epworth – production (tracks 2, 3)
- Mark Rankin – engineering (track 2); production assistance (track 3)
- Craig Silvey – mixing (tracks 2, 3)
- Bryan Wilson – mixing assistance (tracks 2, 3)
- Ted Jensen – mastering (tracks 2, 3)
- Eg White – production (track 4)
- James Ford – production, mixing (track 5)
- Charlie Hugall – production, mixing (tracks 6–8)

== Charts ==
=== Weekly charts ===
Chart (2011–2012)	Peak position
Australian Albums (ARIA)	1
Austrian Albums (Ö3 Austria)	12
Belgian Albums (Ultratop Flanders)	4
Belgian Albums (Ultratop Wallonia)	11
Canadian Albums (Billboard)	4
Croatian Albums (HDU)	19
Danish Albums (Hitlisten)	19
Dutch Albums (Album Top 100)	14
Finnish Albums (Suomen virallinen lista)	26
French Albums (SNEP)	31
German Albums (Offizielle Top 100)	7
Greek Albums (IFPI)	12
Irish Albums (IRMA)	1
Italian Albums (FIMI)	19
Mexican Albums (Top 100 Mexico)	77
New Zealand Albums (RMNZ)	1
Norwegian Albums (VG-lista)	6
Polish Albums (ZPAV)	2
Portuguese Albums (AFP)	5
Scottish Albums (OCC)	1
Spanish Albums (Promusicae)	25
Swedish Albums (Sverigetopplistan)	21
Swiss Albums (Schweizer Hitparade)	10
UK Albums (OCC)	1
US Billboard 200	4
US Top Alternative Albums (Billboard)	1
US Top Rock Albums (Billboard)	1
US Indie Store Album Sales (Billboard)	1

=== Year-end charts ===
Chart (2011)	Position
Australian Albums (ARIA)	16
Belgian Albums (Ultratop Flanders)	87
Irish Albums (IRMA)	14
New Zealand Albums (RMNZ)	16
Polish Albums (ZPAV)	61
UK Albums (OCC)	22
UK Rock Albums (OCC)	3
US Top Alternative Albums (Billboard)	30
US Top Rock Albums (Billboard)	43

Chart (2012)	Position
Australian Albums (ARIA)	16
Belgian Albums (Ultratop Flanders)	25
German Albums (Offizielle Top 100)	58
Irish Albums (IRMA)	17
New Zealand Albums (RMNZ)	26
Polish Albums (ZPAV)	66
Swiss Albums (Schweizer Hitparade)	83
UK Albums (OCC)	30
US Billboard 200	33
US Top Alternative Albums (Billboard)	8
US Top Rock Albums (Billboard)	8

Chart (2013)	Position
US Top Alternative Albums (Billboard)	44
US Top Rock Albums (Billboard)	60

=== Decade-end charts ===
Chart (2010–2019)	Position
Australian Albums (ARIA)	28
UK Albums (OCC)	67

== Certifications ==
Region	Certification	Certified units/sales
Australia (ARIA)	4× Platinum	280,000^{‡}
Austria (IFPI Austria)	Gold	10,000^{*}
Belgium (BRMA)	Gold	15,000^{*}
Brazil (Pro-Música Brasil)	Platinum	40,000^{‡}
Brazil (Pro-Música Brasil) (Original Deluxe Version)	Platinum	40,000^{‡}
Canada (Music Canada)	Gold	40,000^{^}
Denmark (IFPI Danmark)	Gold	10,000^{‡}
Germany (BVMI)	3× Gold	300,000^{‡}
Ireland (IRMA)	3× Platinum	45,000^{^}
Italy (FIMI)	Gold	25,000^{‡}
New Zealand (RMNZ)	4× Platinum	60,000^{‡}
Poland (ZPAV)	Platinum	20,000^{*}
United Kingdom (BPI)	3× Platinum	900,000^{‡}
United States (RIAA)	Platinum	1,002,000
^{*} Sales figures based on certification alone.^{^} Shipments figures based on certification alone.^{‡} Sales+streaming figures based on certification alone.

== Release history ==
Region	Date	Edition	Label	Ref.
Australia	28 October 2011	Standard; deluxe	Universal	
Germany	28 October 2011	Standard; deluxe	Universal	
Netherlands	28 October 2011	Standard; deluxe	Universal	
Ireland	28 October 2011	Standard; deluxe	Island	
United Kingdom	31 October 2011	Standard; deluxe	Island	
France	31 October 2011	Standard; deluxe	Universal	
Italy	31 October 2011	Standard	Universal	
Canada	1 November 2011	Standard; deluxe	Universal	
United States	1 November 2011	Standard; deluxe	Universal Republic	
Italy	8 November 2011	Deluxe	Universal	
Japan	25 January 2012	Standard	Universal	
Belgium	29 June 2012	Limited festival edition	Universal	
Netherlands	29 June 2012	Limited festival edition	Universal	
United Kingdom	27 July 2012	Deluxe (digital reissue)	Island	
Australia	16 November 2012	Limited	Universal	

== See also ==
- List of 2011 albums
- List of number-one albums from the 2010s (New Zealand)
- List of number-one albums of 2011 (Australia)
- List of number-one albums of 2011 (Ireland)
- List of number-one albums of 2011 (Scotland)
- List of UK Albums Chart number ones of the 2010s
