= Never Let Me Go (Florence and the Machine song) =

2012 single by Florence and the Machine

Single by Florence and the Machine

from the album Ceremonials
- B-side: "Never Let Me Go" (Clams Casino Remix)
- Released: 30 March 2012
- Recorded: 2011
- Genre: Baroque pop; indie pop; gospel
- Length: 4:31
- Label: Island
- Songwriters: Florence Welch; Paul Epworth; Tom Hull
- Producer: Paul Epworth

Florence and the Machine singles chronology
"No Light, No Light" (2012)	"Never Let Me Go" (2012)	"Breath of Life" (2012)

Music video
- "Never Let Me Go" on YouTube

"Never Let Me Go" is a song by English indie rock band Florence and the Machine from their second studio album, Ceremonials (2011). The song was written by Florence Welch and Paul Epworth while production was handled by Epworth. Island Records released the song as the third single from the album on 30 March 2012. The band first premiered the song during one of their concerts before the release of the album on 15 October 2011. A Clams Casino remix of the song was placed on the 12" white vinyl single which was available for pre-order on 22 March 2012.

Musically, "Never Let Me Go" is a downtempo baroque pop and indie pop ballad in the key of A major completed with piano and drums while backing vocals repeatedly sing "never let me go" throughout the song. Many critics noted similarities between the song's composition and materials by other artists including Enya, Evanescence and Ryan Tedder-produced songs. The song received acclaim by critics who praised Welch's vocals and its balladry nature. Commercially, "Never Let Me Go" reached the top 10 in Israel and Australia, where it has been certified multi-platinum.

An accompanying music video for the song was released online on 8 March 2012. It was directed by Tabitha Denholm and stars actor Jamie Campbell Bower, who plays Welch's love interest. The video features the pair together skating and shots of a dirty water trickling down Welch's face and hands are shown. Upon the release of the video, critics praised Welch's gothic look and the video's dark atmosphere. Florence and the Machine added the song to the set list of their second worldwide Ceremonials Tour (2011–2012) where the song was performed during the encore of the concerts along with "No Light, No Light".

== Background and release ==
"Never Let Me Go" was written by Florence Welch, Paul Epworth, and Kid Harpoon while production was handled by Epworth. Florence and the Machine premiered "Never Let Me Go" along with two other songs from the album, "Spectrum" and "Heartlines" as part of their set list at New York's Creators Project on 15 October 2011, two weeks before the release of the album. Speaking about the song, Welch told Digital Spy, "The gospel thing comes from my obsession with hymns. I'm drawn to anything that has a hymnal quality, be it Spiritualized or dusty old albums by Georgian choirs." Island Records released "Never Let Me Go" as the third single from the album on 2 April 2012. A Clams Casino remix of the song was placed on the 12" white vinyl single which was available for pre-order on 22 March 2012. The artwork for the vinyl single was shot by Karl Lagerfeld and was described by The Guardian's Michael Cragg as "swanky". Andrew Martin of Prefix Magazine commented that the "Clams Casino's remix of [the song]... was the weirdest thing to happen to Florence Welch's voice". The Guardian's Michael Cragg commented, "He takes the stately Never Let Me Go and adds gusts of distorted backing vocals, big drum claps and, midway through, pitches Florence Welch's vocals down a notch or two to create what sounds like an eerie duet recorded in a cave."

== Composition ==
"Never Let Me Go" is a downtempo baroque pop ballad with elements of indie pop. It has a piano-led instrumentation accompanied by thumping drums. Lyrically, the theme of the song revolves around the sea and the ocean, interpreted in the lines "The arms of the ocean so sweet and so cold/And all this devotion I never knew at all". The song also talks about sin and redemption. According to Michael Hann of The Guardian, the opening lyrics "Looking out from underneath, fractured moonlight on the sea", of the song sound similar to the songs written by Elizabeth Fraser in the group This Mortal Coil. Backing vocals are heard during the chorus repeatedly singing the lines "never let me go". Many critics noted similarities between "Never Let Me Go" and artists such as Enya and Evanescence. The production of the song was also compared with Ryan Tedder-produced songs. Jillian Mapes of Billboard magazine further noted that "Never Let Me Go" sounds more similar to the songs from the band's debut studio album Lungs (2009).

== Critical reception ==
"Never Let Me Go" received critical acclaim by music critics. Neil McCormick of The Daily Telegraph chose "Never Let Me Go" as a highlight on the whole album. Rebecca Nicholson of The Guardian praised the song saying that it has "thumping stadium drums and sounds like it has the US charts in its epic crosshairs." Similarly, Robert Copsey of Digital Spy said, "Big enough to bring a stadium audience to its knees, it's more structured and less hectic than anything on her debut, but still remains packed with eccentricities." In a separate review of the single, Copsey graded it with four out of five stars saying, "she chants with pent-up emotion over a neo-gothic piano riff, before letting it all pour out on a chorus of sweeping strings and crashing cymbals. The result is her least hectic cut to date, but much like her contemporaries, remains full of eccentricity." Slant Magazine's Matthew Cole called the song "gorgeous... [and] easily the best ballad Florence has done yet". Another writer of the same publication commented that "Welch is perfectly capable of doing delicate too, as evidenced by... "Never Let Me Go". David Edwards of the website Drowned in Sound commented that "by the end of the superb 'Never Let Me Go', you could easily be forgiven for thinking that you are listening to one of the most unexpected surprises of 2011, so strong and resonant is the roar of the opening salvo." Richard Smirke of Billboard magazine called the song an "impassioned midpaced ballad". Ryan Reed of The Phoenix gave a mixed review for the song saying "When she exclaims, 'It's all over; I'm going under,' it's unclear whether she's committing suicide or practicing her can-opener dive. Either way, it's boring. On occasion, her show-off-y melisma floats past acquired taste into plain ol' ridiculousness.

== Commercial performance ==
"Never Let Me Go" debuted at number 135 on the UK Singles Chart for the week ending 7 April 2012, peaking at number eighty-two the following week, making it their second lowest-charting single to date. The song entered the Australian Singles Chart at number nineteen and peaked three weeks later at number three, earning the band their highest-charting single to date in the country. In Belgium, the single charted on the Ultratip charts at number fifteen in Flanders and at number forty-three in Wallonia. In July 2018, its sales in the United Kingdom were 133,000, and in October 2024, it was certified Gold by the British Phonographic Industry for passing 400,000 combined sales and streams.

== Music video ==
"Of course, given the cavernous, darkly lit spaces the video inhabits, it's also a nice fit to the song's voluminous, dream-like sonics. Truly, a skating rink hasn't looked this moody since, well, ever – to the point where you can practically feel the chill running its way up Welch's stockings. And as for Campbell Bower, well, he's plenty icy too... Call it love on ice. Or a darkly spiritual rumination on the politics of figure skating. Either way, with 'Never Let Me Go,' Welch definitely adds to her impressive list of eye-catching clips, emotes and wails and flails, and gives skating its biggest artistic bump... It's chillingly effective, and just as beautiful, too."

— James Montgomery, MTV News

An accompanying music video for the song was released on Bing on 7 March 2012. Along with the music video, behind-the-scenes video was also released. It was directed by Tabitha Denholm. The video stars actor Jamie Campbell Bower who plays Welch's love interest in the video.

The video starts with Welch looking into an ice rink which holds an arcade. A man is seen using the arcade machines as Welch enters, wearing torn, worn away clothing. As the first chorus starts, the ice rink is lit up by the man with spotlights moving around. Several scenes are shown throughout the video of water e.g. an overflowing sink, a floor being mopped, watery footprints on the floor. What looks like dirty water is shown trickling down Welch's face and hands. She walks onto the ice rink and the man enters, leading them to dance with each other and hug. As Florence dances on her own, a cleaner is shown to be watching. Towards the end of the song, Welch looks at the man and starts to fall back, her face and hands engulfed by dirty water as the woman cleaner looks on.

Nick Neyland of Prefix Magazine compared the video with Kazuo Ishiguro's eponymous novel, Never Let Me Go (2005). Melinda Newman of the website HitFix praised Welch's gothic look and wrote, "It's spooky and we don't fully understand it. It’s one of those videos that creates an atmosphere more than a linear story." Leah Collins of the Canadian magazine Dose commented that in the video, "Welch is the sort of gal who busts into skating rinks after hours with her skid boyfriend... The kind of gal who dyes her hair by summoning dark, demonic spirits -- ones who ooze out of her pores, and various plumbing fixtures, until she's nothing but a black-haired creepy mist." MTV News' James Montgomery called the video "ethereal" and said, "Never Let Me Go" is certainly visually arresting, but it also works on another level: Namely, it perfectly (and artfully) captures the experience of literally melting in the presence of a lover, the feeling of casting abandon to the wind and giving yourself away truly and completely." Consequence of Sound's Alex Young commented briefly "Don’t watch this one before breakfast." A writer of The Huffington Post gave a mixed review for the video, saying that it had an unclear plot.

== Live performances ==
Florence and the Machine added the song to the set list of their second worldwide Ceremonials Tour (2011–12) where the song was performed during the encore of the concerts along with "No Light, No Light". A live performance of the song is included in Florence and the Machine's live album MTV Unplugged – A Live Album (2012) which was recorded in December 2011. Since then "Never Let Me Go" has only been played on two subsequent tours, 2022's Dance Fever Tour and 2026's Everybody Scream Tour This was because Florence "didn't like it" because it was a time in her life where she was under pressure writing her second album, and being "sad, young and drunk" vowing never to play it again. However, during the COVID-19 pandemic she vowed to bring it back as a thank-you.

== Track listing ==
Digital download and limited 12" single

1. "Never Let Me Go"
2. "Never Let Me Go" (Clams Casino Remix)

== Charts ==
=== Weekly charts ===
Chart (2012)	Peak position
Australia (ARIA)	3
Belgium (Ultratip Bubbling Under Flanders)	15
Belgium (Ultratip Bubbling Under Wallonia)	43
Canada Hot 100 (Billboard)	75
Ireland (IRMA)	73
Israel International Airplay (Media Forest)	9
Scotland Singles (OCC)	75
UK Singles (OCC)	82
US Rock Digital Songs (Billboard)	18

=== Year-end charts ===
Chart (2012)	Position
Australia (ARIA)	30

== Certifications ==
Region	Certification	Certified units/sales
Australia (ARIA)	6× Platinum	420,000^{‡}
Brazil (Pro-Música Brasil)	Platinum	60,000^{‡}
New Zealand (RMNZ)	Platinum	30,000^{‡}
United Kingdom (BPI)	Gold	400,000^{‡}
United States (RIAA)	Gold	500,000^{‡}
^{‡} Sales+streaming figures based on certification alone.
