= Lover to Lover =

Single by Florence and the Machine

from the album Ceremonials
- Released: 30 November 2012
- Recorded: 2010–11
- Genre: Indie pop; gospel
- Length: 4:02
- Label: Island
- Songwriters: Florence Welch; Francis White
- Producers: Paul Epworth; Chris Hayden (additional producer of the Ceremonials Tour version)

Florence and the Machine singles chronology
"Spectrum (Say My Name)" (2012)	"Lover to Lover" (2012)	"What Kind of Man" (2015)

Music video
- "Lover To Lover" on YouTube

"Lover to Lover" is a song by English indie rock band Florence and the Machine. The song was released on 30 November 2012, as a digital download on iTunes as the fifth and final single from their second studio album Ceremonials (2011). The song was written by Florence Welch and Francis "Eg" White and produced by Paul Epworth. The Ceremonials Tour version of "Lover to Lover" is an edited version of the original with further production by Chris Hayden.

== Critical reception ==
"Lover to Lover" received acclaim from music critics. In a review of Ceremonials, Allison Fitts of Dart News Online praised the song, calling it "one of the most unique [songs] on Ceremonials" and saying, "'Lover to Lover' is basically what the band would have sounded like 50 years ago", and compared it to the works of Fitz & the Tantrums. American magazines Rolling Stone and Billboard, in their reviews of the album, compared the song to the work of Adele.

== Music video ==
A music video to accompany the release of Lover to Lover was first released onto YouTube on 19 November 2012 at a total length of four minutes and twenty seconds. The video stars Welch alongside Australian actor Ben Mendelsohn and was directed by Vincent Haycock, who previously worked with the band when he directed the music video for Calvin Harris's single, "Sweet Nothing."

== Charts ==
Chart (2012)	Peak position
Belgium (Ultratip Bubbling Under Flanders)	25
US Hot Rock & Alternative Songs (Billboard)	44

== Release history ==
Country	Release date	Format	Label
United Kingdom	30 November 2012	Digital download	Island Records
