= Brit Awards 2012 =

British music awards ceremony

- Date: 21 February 2012
- Venue: The O2 Arena
- Hosted by: James Corden

Highlights
- Most awards: Adele and Ed Sheeran (2)
- Most nominations: Ed Sheeran (4)
- Website: brits.co.uk

Television/radio coverage
- Network: ITV
- Viewership: 6.2 million

Brit Awards 2012 was held on 21 February 2012. This was the 32nd edition of the British Phonographic Industry's annual Brit Awards. The awards ceremony was held at The O2 Arena in London for the second time. The ceremony was presented by James Corden. Leading the nominations was Ed Sheeran with four, followed by Adele and Jessie J with three, whilst Bon Iver, Aloe Blacc, Coldplay and Florence and the Machine all had two.

Amy Winehouse and Whitney Houston received remembrance tributes due to their deaths in July 2011 and February 2012, respectively. Adele picked up two awards for Best British Album and British Female, whilst Sheeran also won two awards for Best British Male and British Breakthrough. Blur received the Outstanding Contribution to Music award. The statue was designed by Peter Blake.

== Performances ==
Artist(s)	Song(s)	UK Singles Chart reaction (week ending 3 March 2012)	UK Albums Chart reaction (week ending 3 March 2012)
Coldplay	"Charlie Brown"	30 (re-entry)	Mylo Xyloto – 6 (+5)
Florence and the Machine	"No Light, No Light"	50 (re-entry)	Ceremonials – 9 (+14); Lungs – 34 (+22)
Olly Murs; Rizzle Kicks	"Heart Skips a Beat"	52 (+34)	Olly Murs; In Case You Didn't Know – 16 (+1); Olly Murs – 53 (–8) Rizzle Kicks; Stereo Typical – 23 (–5)
Ed Sheeran	"Lego House"	17 (+20)	+ – 3 (+2)
Noel Gallagher's High Flying Birds; Chris Martin	"AKA... What a Life!"	47 (re-entry)	Noel Gallagher's High Flying Birds – 12 (+4)
Adele	"Rolling in the Deep"	28 (+11)	21 – 1 (+2); 19 – 7 (+2)
Bruno Mars	"Just the Way You Are"	67 (+16)	Doo-Wops & Hooligans – 11 (+4)
Rihanna	"We Found Love"	22 (+12)	Talk That Talk – 18 (+9); Loud – 26 (+2); Good Girl Gone Bad – 90 (re-entry)
Blur; Phil Daniels	"Girls & Boys" "Song 2" "Parklife" "Tender" "This Is a Low"	Did not chart 64; 74; Did not chart Did not chart	Blur: The Best Of – 22 (re-entry)

== Winners and nominees ==
British Album of the Year (presented by George Michael)	British Producer of the Year (presented by Laura Marling)
Adele – 21; Coldplay – Mylo Xyloto; Ed Sheeran – +; Florence and the Machine – Ceremonials; PJ Harvey – Let England Shake	Ethan Johns; Paul Epworth; Flood
British Single of the Year (presented by Tinie Tempah)	Critics' Choice Award (presented by James Corden and Jessie J)
One Direction – "What Makes You Beautiful"; Adele – "Someone Like You"; Ed Sheeran – "The A Team"; Example – "Changed the Way You Kiss Me"; Jessie J featuring B.o.B – "Price Tag"; JLS featuring Dev – "She Makes Me Wanna"; Military Wives – "Wherever You Are"; Olly Murs featuring Rizzle Kicks – "Heart Skips a Beat"; Pixie Lott – "All About Tonight"; The Wanted – "Glad You Came"	Emeli Sandé; Maverick Sabre; Michael Kiwanuka
British Male Solo Artist (presented by Plan B)	British Female Solo Artist (presented by Kylie Minogue)
Ed Sheeran; James Blake; James Morrison; Noel Gallagher's High Flying Birds; Professor Green	Adele; Florence and the Machine; Jessie J; Kate Bush; Laura Marling
British Group (presented by Jo Whiley and Huey Morgan)	British Breakthrough Act (presented by Cesc Fàbregas and Nicole Scherzinger)
Coldplay; Arctic Monkeys; Chase & Status; Elbow; Kasabian	Ed Sheeran; Anna Calvi; Emeli Sandé; Jessie J; The Vaccines
International Male Solo Artist (presented by Jessie J and Jack Whitehall)	International Female Solo Artist (presented by Jenson Button)
Bruno Mars; Aloe Blacc; Bon Iver; David Guetta; Ryan Adams	Rihanna; Beyoncé; Björk; Feist; Lady Gaga
International Group (presented by Brian May and Roger Taylor)	International Breakthrough Act (presented by will.i.am and Rob Brydon)
Foo Fighters; Fleet Foxes; Jay-Z and Kanye West; Lady Antebellum; Maroon 5	Lana Del Rey; Aloe Blacc; Bon Iver; Foster the People; Nicki Minaj

=== Outstanding Contribution to Music ===
- Blur (presented by Ray Winstone)

== Multiple nominations and awards ==
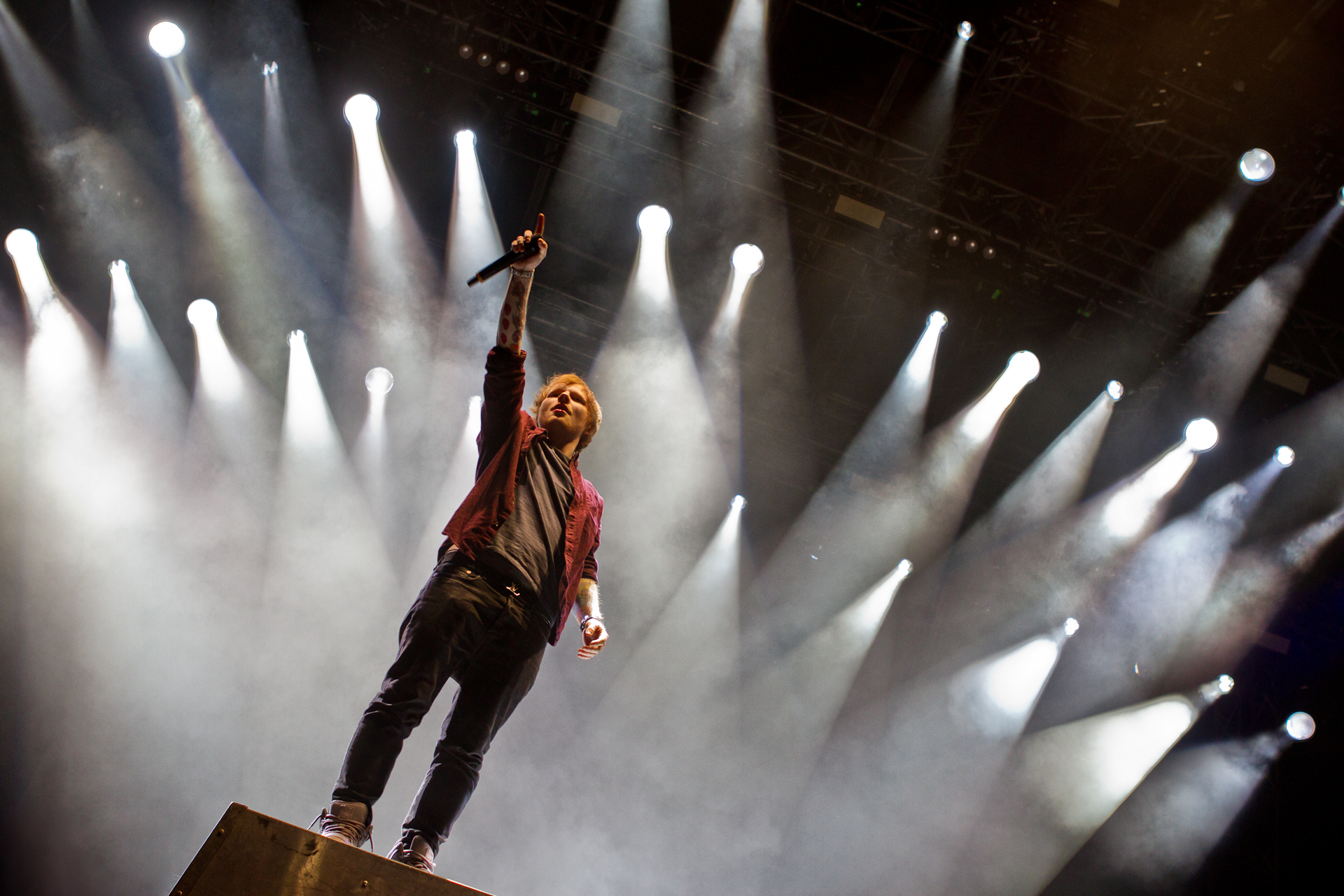
Two-time winner Ed Sheeran as most nominations and awards

Artists that received multiple nominations
Nominations	Artist
4	Ed Sheeran
3 (2)	Adele
3 (2)	Jessie J
2 (5)	Aloe Blacc
2 (5)	Bon Iver
2 (5)	Coldplay
2 (5)	Emeli Sandé
2 (5)	Florence and the Machine

Artists that received multiple awards
Awards	Artist
2 (2)	Adele
2 (2)	Ed Sheeran

== Acceptance speech controversy ==
=== Adele and Blur ===
Adele was cut off by host James Corden during her acceptance speech for the MasterCard British Album of the Year award, causing her to "give the finger" on national television. Adele stated that the gesture was aimed at "the suits", not her fans. ITV issued an apology to the show as a spokesman for the network stated:

The Brits is a live event. Unfortunately the programme was over-running and we had to move on. We would like to apologise to Adele for the interruption.

Corden was also upset by the occurrence, stating afterwards:

I don't understand what happened but I'm upset about it. Blur get to play for 11 minutes and [Adele] gets to say thank you once.

Due to the over-running, Blur's set was also cut off, prior to their performance of "Tender".

=== Emeli Sandé ===
There was more controversy later on in the show when Emeli Sandé wasn't allowed to give a speech after winning the Critic's Choice Award. Sandé was said to be distressed by the bosses of the show and also angry after Adele got an apology for being cut off, whereas she did not. During the presentation of the award, previous winner Jessie J was asked to give her advice on her career instead of Sandé giving a speech. A friend of Sandé's said to the Daily Record:

She's had a number-one album with Our Version of Events in the UK and they're asking Jessie J what advice she has got for her.

A spokesman for ITV later gave an apology to Sandé, stating:

Because there was more music than ever before, everything got pushed back. The public love Emeli. They really support her and think she's fantastic.
