= No Light, No Light =

2012 single by Florence + the Machine

Single by Florence + the Machine

from the album Ceremonials
- B-side: "No Light, No Light" (DAS remix)
- Released: 16 January 2012
- Recorded: 2011
- Studio: Abbey Road, London
- Genre: Art rock; indie rock
- Length: 4:34 (album version); 4:19 (single edit)
- Label: Island
- Songwriters: Florence Welch; Isabella Summers
- Producer: Paul Epworth

Florence + the Machine singles chronology
"Shake It Out" (2011)	"No Light, No Light" (2012)	"Never Let Me Go" (2012)

Music video
- "No Light, No Light" on YouTube

"No Light, No Light" is a song by English indie rock band Florence and the Machine from their second studio album, Ceremonials (2011). The song was written by band members Florence Welch and Isabella Summers while the production was handled by Paul Epworth. Island Records released the song as the second single from the album on 16 January 2012. The song was the first one written for the album in the band's tour bus in Amsterdam. Lyrically, in the song, Welch expresses frustration about the state of her fragile relationship and further tries to keep it together. "No Light, No Light" received positive reviews by music critics who generally praised Welch's vocals and the drum-led instrumentation. It was also placed on several critics' year-end lists of best singles. The song peaked at number 50 on the UK Singles Chart, the Irish Singles Chart and number 39 on the US Billboard Alternative Songs chart.

An accompanying music video for the song premiered on 18 November 2011 and was directed by Icelandic duo Arni & Kinski. It includes shots of Welch singing on a skyscraper and being chased by a contortionist. Upon its release, the video received mixed to positive reviews by critics who praised the dramatic shots, the religion and voodoo references. However, following its online release, several publications and users on various websites commented on the use of racism and racial imagery due to the black face of the voodoo man at the beginning, which Welch later denied. "No Light, No Light" was performed live by the band several times on television shows and at the 2012 BRIT Awards held at The O2 Arena in London. They also performed the song during the encore of their second worldwide Ceremonials Tour (2011–12).

== Background and release ==
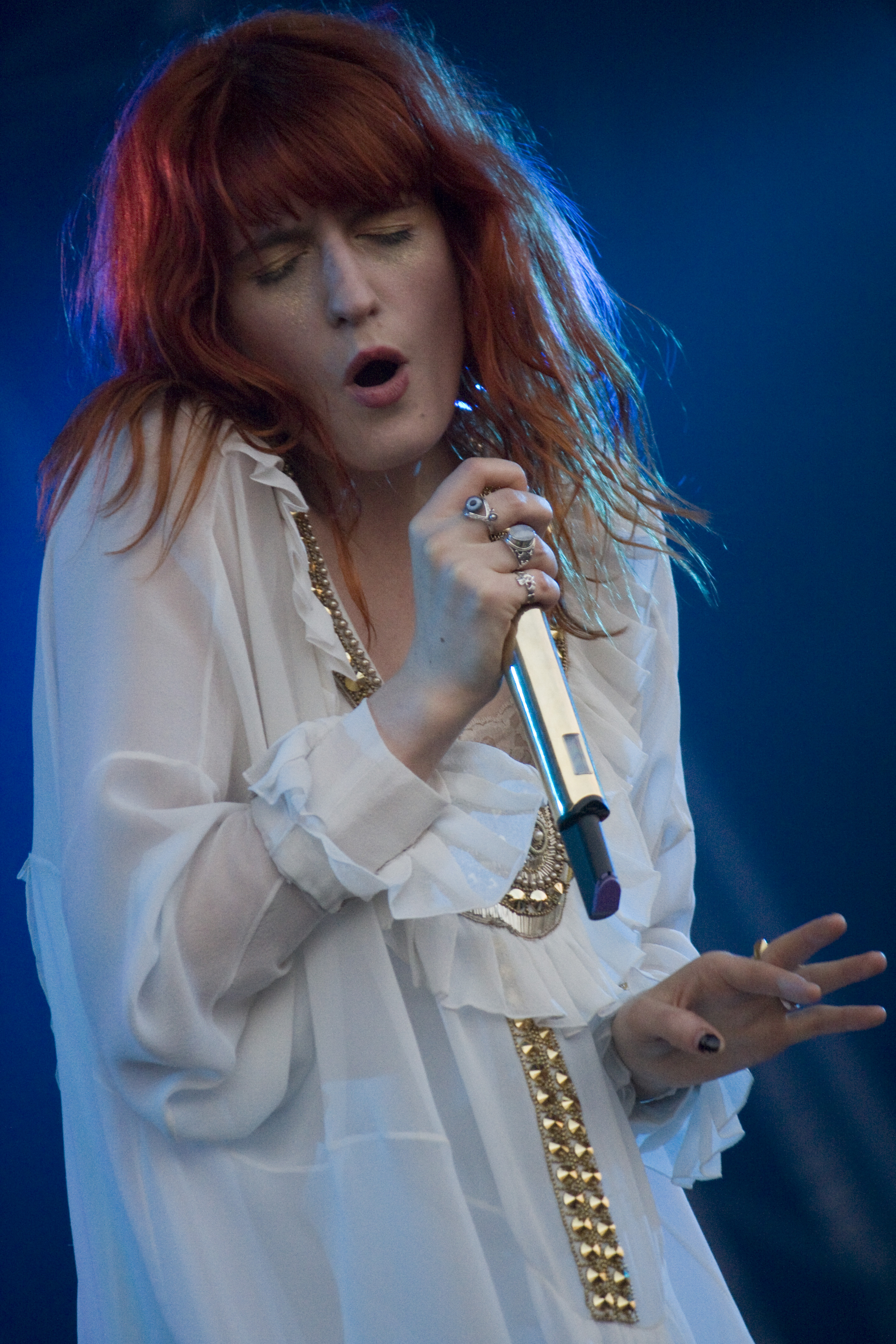
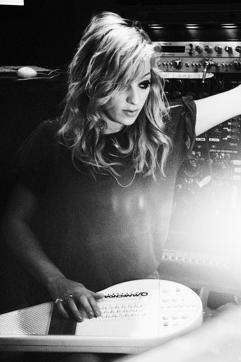
Florence Welch (left) and Isabella Summers (right) wrote "No Light, No Light".

"No Light, No Light" was written by band members Florence Welch and Isabella Summers while the production was handled by Paul Epworth. The song was recorded in 2011 at the Abbey Road Studios. According to Welch, "No Light, No Light" was the first song written for the album. During an interview with MTV News she confirmed the release of the song. Welch further revealed that the intro of the song was written during the tour in Amsterdam, "We had gone out for Rob [Ackroyd]'s birthday to an all-night restaurant in Brussels called Midnights. We went to this funny restaurant and then got on the tour bus and everyone was a bit drunk and it was like, 'Yeah, let's write a song.'" Welch also said that "No Light, No Light" was also recorded in Amsterdam, "And we recorded the sound of the bus moving, a real drone-y bass sound, and that's the intro, and then the tour bus arrived in Amsterdam [and we were saying], 'Let's go toast this song! We will find a bar that will serve us drinks at 7 in the morning! Come!'.[...] So we trotted off into Amsterdam and managed to find a sports bar that would only serve us Midori. It was bright-green drinks and me and Isa [Summers] kind of looking like crazy old ladies." During an interview with Los Angeles Times, Welch further described the song as "one of the biggest tracks on the album." Island Records released the song as the third single from Ceremonials on 16 January with two remixes by Dave Sitek and Breakage. Consequence of Sound's Chris Coplan gave a mixed review for the remix by Dave Sitek, saying: "In the able hands of Sitek, 'No Light, No Light' loses some of its melodramatic air, replaced instead with an effervescent, club-ready vibe. Both tracks may be decidedly similar, but they'll evoke wholly unique sets of emotions." A limited 12" vinyl single was released simultaneously with the remix single.

== Composition ==
"No Light, No Light" is an art rock song with an indie rock bridge. According to the sheet music published on the website Musicnotes.com by Universal Music Publishing Group, "No Light, No Light" is written in the key of A Minor with 132 beats per minute. Welch's vocals range from the note G_{3} to E_{5}. The song begins with pulsating tribal drums as stated by Kyle Anderson of Entertainment Weekly. According to Billboard magazine's Jillian Mapes, "A dramatic opening note on the... [song] ushers in a drum crescendo, followed by a 'Like a Prayer' - style interlude." During the choir-led chorus, Welch sings the lines, "You can't choose what stays and what fades away/ And I'd do anything to make you stay/ No light, no light/ Tell me what you want me to say" over "thundering tribal" beats and harp strings that "grow louder and louder". Lyrically, in the song she is expressing frustration about the state of her fragile relationship and she further tries to keep it together. Ryan Dombal of the website Pitchfork Media commented that "No Light, No Light" was one of the songs where Welch "sets aside her usual flighty, dreamy, goth-y lyrical go-to's-- ghosts, graveyards, devils, angels, myths, drowning-- for something a bit more personal." During the musical bridge of the song, Welch sings the lines "Would you leave me, if I told you what I'd become. 'Cause it's so easy to sing it to a crowd/ But it's so hard, my love/ To say it to you out loud", which according to Mapes shows Welch "on her knees, begging her lover not to go". Alix Buscovic of BBC Online compared the song with Florence and the Machine's earlier song "Cosmic Love", while Newsday's Glenn Gamboa compared "No Light, No Light" with Kate Bush's songs. Sam Wolfson of The Guardian joked that the song talks about Tess Daly.

== Critical reception ==
"No Light, No Light" received widespread critical acclaim from music critics. Ryan Dombal of the website Pitchfork Media praised the song, saying that the lines "double as a snippet of self-criticism." He added: "Perhaps Welch finds it 'so easy' to sing her tunes to thousands because they often lack an individual touch that could send them even further skyward-- the same touch that comes so naturally to fellow UK chart queen Adele." Spin's Rob Harvilla commented that "No Light, No Light" was "a desperate lovers' quarrel, all agitated strings and galloping drums (no broken jaws or burning beds this time, alas)." Clash magazine's Laura Foster called the song "uplifting" and "typically Florence-sounding" further putting it in her list of "six massive anthems" on Ceremonials. Alex Buscovic of the website BBC Online called "No Light, No Light" a "drum-chased, harp-gilded and hook-jawed" song. However, Buscovic commented that its "epic proportions are too much." Randall Roberts of Los Angeles Times called the song an anthem, which according to him, was "as overpowering as 'Dog Days Are Over.'" In his review of Ceremonials, Jillian Mapes of Billboard wrote "'I'd do anything to make you stay / Tell me what you want me to say,' she pleads atop the album's most pulsating tribal drumbeat. Musically, the song exudes utter strength; lyrically, Welch is on her knees." In a review of the album, Rebecca Nicholson of The Guardian commented,

A wonky piano, a choir and the return of the harp, as well as more Phil Collins-ey drums, in the tale of what appears to be a humdinger of a domestic – "Kiss with a Fist", but more grown-up, and colder. "I'd do anything to make you stay," she sings, before switching tack: "You want a revelation, no light no light in your bright blue eyes." Like the rest of these tracks, it's kitchen sink and then some, but there's a little more texture here.

In the review of the album, Lewis Corner of the website Digital Spy said that the song "manages to sound knee-quiveringly epic". Later, in a separate review of the single he graded it with five stars out of five commenting that "she pleads to her beau in her unmistakable folk-tinged timbre". The Boston Globe's Mesfin Fekadu noted that Welch's vocals were "impeccable throughout" and "sounding bossy" in the track. Luren Murphy of The Irish Times reviewed the song positively saying that it's "providing the huge choruses and skyscraping vocals we’ve come to expect of Florence and the Machine". However, Eoin Butler of the same publication rated the song with two out of five stars commenting, "Like most of Florence's recent singles, this bombastic effort sounds as though it was intended to be enjoyed not on an iPod or CD player but rather sitting in Row 198 in the local EnormoDome." Priya Elan of NME noted that the song was "the most traditionally Florence-like track" further comparing it with "Rabbit Heart (Raise It Up)" (2009) and with songs by Björk. A writer of the website Slant Magazine said, "The album is steeped in melodrama, with pump organs, choirs, and strings expertly deployed as pure pomp on...'No Light, No Light.'"

Time placed the song at number one on their list of "Top 10 Songs of 2011". The writer further commented: "In another context, this 'No Light, No Light' could be the sound of a religious revival. Florence Welch's rich voice has never sounded better than on this track; her fervent, even rapturous, lamentations about her partner's lost love resonate like requests for salvation made by a faltering believer with arms raised to the sky. 'Heaven help me, I need to make it right' she wails, but gets no reply. Replete with harps and a tribal drum beat, 'No Light, No Light' operates as a plea for salvation that will soon have you running to your deity of choice." On the Triple J Hottest 100 list, "No Light, No Light" was ranked at number 36. It was also ranked at number 343 on The Village Voice's year-end Pazz & Jop singles list.

== Commercial performance ==
"No Light, No Light" debuted at number 67 on the UK Singles Chart dated 28 January 2012. It eventually peaked at number 50 for the week ending 3 March 2012 following the band's performance at the 2012 BRIT Awards, selling 6,909 copies. On the Hungarian Airplay Chart, the song debuted at number 40 on 6 February 2012 and later peaked at number 36 for the week ending 27 February 2012. On 1 March 2012, "No Light, No Light" debuted at number 50 on the Irish Singles Chart and failed to re-enter the chart. On the ARIA Singles Chart, the song debuted and peaked at number 95 for the week commencing 30 January 2012. On the Belgian Ultratip Singles Chart, the song peaked at number 10 on 21 January 2012. In the US, the song debuted at number 39 on the Billboard Alternative Songs chart. On the chart issue dated 25 April 2012, the song debuted at number 48 on the US Billboard Rock Songs chart.

== Music video ==
=== Background and release ===
An accompanying music video for the song was released on Florence and the Machine's official Vevo account on 18 November 2011. It was directed by Icelandic duo Arni & Kinski. A teaser was also uploaded on their Vevo account on 15 November 2011. During an interview with MTV News, Welch revealed some of the stories behind the inspiration of the music video saying, "When [directors Arni and Kinski] pitched it to me, I loved the idea of stained glass ... and this falling thing, to do it on a New York skyline was really important to me, and there's some weird stuff with my grandmother about New York that's kind of too dark to go into... The idea of falling from a great height in New York is intense ... because my grandmother, she died in New York, and I literally didn't think about it until we were filming and I was like, 'This is kind of insane.'"

=== Synopsis ===
The video begins with Welch lying next to a crystal skull. Several scenes showing a masked and shirtless contortionist sitting on a chair follow and soon after he starts to dance and takes his mask off. The video then moves into a church where a choir consisting of kids (The Trinity Boys Choir) starts singing the song. Welch is then seen atop of a building as the contortionist takes a voodoo doll in his hands. He puts a needle in the doll and Welch falls from the building. She later falls in the church where she is being caught and held by the choir. Welch then ends up in the arms of her love interest, played by actor Torstein Bjorklund. Shots of Welch being chased by the contortionist in a town are interspersed amongst the other elements of the video.

=== Reception ===
Marc Hogan of Spin concluded that the video, "touches on the fine line between spiritual ecstasy and reckless abandon." Jillian Mapes of Billboard magazine commented that the video is exploring a "territory between Christianity and voodoo spirituality." Mapes further praised the video for being dramatic, but he wrote that "more than that, it's completely absurd." A writer of Rolling Stone concluded: "[the video] does not shy away from matching the music's melodramatic intensity. In addition to contrasting overtly Christian iconography with images of some kind of voodoo priest, the harrowing climax is paired with footage of Florence Welch falling from the top of a skyscraper." Writing for Dose, Leah Collins found "seriously life-threatening juju going on in No Light, No Light [video]" Nick Neyland of Prefix Magazine wrote: "That song ["No Light. No Light"] just got a suitably opulent video, which is full of religious imagery, Florence perched atop a building in Manhattan, and a strange masked figure. What does it all mean? We have no idea, but anyone who's afraid of heights may want to look away when Florence starts flinging herself across that rooftop and ultimately takes to the skies and starts flying (seriously)." Eoin Butler of The Irish Times praised the boys dressed as priests comparing the scenes with a Catholic version of 1976 film Bugsy Malone.

=== Controversy ===
Following the online release of the video, several publications and users on various websites commented on the use of racism and racial imagery due to the black face of the voodoo man at the beginning. During an interview with MTV News, when asked by James Montgomery if she was a part of the Illuminati as online accusations claim, Welch responded, "That's ridiculous. Really? So people [think that?] I'm definitely not [a member]. It's just not true."

== Live performances ==
The band performed the song live for the first time during the show Later... with Jools Holland on 1 November 2011. Matthew Perpetua of Rolling Stone praised the performance saying: "Florence Welch is backed by her full band plus a string section, but as overwhelming as the sound gets, her incredible voice remains the focal point of the performance." Later, on 20 November 2011, they performed the song on Saturday Night Live. On 14 January, the band performed the song on The Jonathan Ross Show. The performance aired on ITV and its regional counterparts at 9:30 pm on 14 January 2012. Nick Neyland of Prefix Magazine praised the performance saying, "Here, Florence delivers an efficient version of the track, via an extremely stoic performance in which she appears clad all in black and barely moves for the duration. The lavish musical backing and her impressive pipes do that talking here, creating the kind of anthemic feel that fast became her M.O. from day one."

They performed the song at the 2012 BRIT Awards at The O2 Arena in London backed by twenty dancers dressed in a white and gold gown.< After the event, the live performance was made available for digital download through the iTunes Store in the United Kingdom. Michael Hogan of The Daily Telegraph compared the dancing during the performance with the dancing by Kate Bush and comparing it with a "tad drama school". He further called the performance "over-the-top" but noted that "Florence Welch's vocals included one hell of a long held note, though". Ann Lee of Metro described their performance as "rousing". However, Andy Gill of The Independent was more negative about the performance saying that "Florence brought along her Machine, but... forgot to pack a decent tune with them."

On 23 April 2012, the band performed the song on the second season of the show The Voice while being backed by the group mentored by Cee Lo Green. Jennifer Still of the website Digital Spy praised the performance, calling it "incredible". Florence and the Machine also added the song to the set list during their second worldwide Ceremonials Tour where the song was performed during the encore of the concerts along with "Never Let Me Go".

== Uses on television ==
The song's Spector Ryan Gosling remix was featured in The CW series The Secret Circle, at the end of the sixteenth episode ("Lucky"). The original version was also prominently featured at the end of the sixteenth episode ("Rest in Pieces") of the tenth season of the CBS series CSI: Miami. The song was used in the Fox series The Mob Doctor, in the fourth-season finale of Syfy's Warehouse 13 and in promotional commercials for NBC's Revolution. The song was featured in the fifth episode of the ninth and final season of The CW series One Tree Hill.

== Track listing ==
- UK digital single
1. "No Light, No Light" – 4:34
2. "No Light, No Light" (Breakage's One Moment Less For Mortimer Mix) – 4:14
3. "No Light, No Light" (DAS Remix) – 4:39
- US digital single
1. "No Light, No Light" (Breakage's One Moment Less For Mortimer Mix) – 4:14
2. "No Light, No Light" (DAS Remix) – 4:39
- Limited 12" single
1. "No Light, No Light" – 4:34
2. "No Light, No Light" (DAS Remix) – 4:39
- 2012 Brit Awards
1. "No Light, No Light" (Live from the BRITs) - 4:03

== Charts ==
=== Weekly charts ===
Chart (2012)	Peak position
Australia (ARIA)	95
Belgium (Ultratip Bubbling Under Flanders)	10
Hungary (Rádiós Top 40)	36
Ireland (IRMA)	50
UK Singles (OCC)	50
US Alternative Airplay (Billboard)	17
US Hot Rock & Alternative Songs (Billboard)	26

=== Year-end charts ===
Chart (2012)	Position
US Hot Rock & Alternative Songs (Billboard)	81

== Certifications ==
Region	Certification	Certified units/sales
Brazil (Pro-Música Brasil)	Gold	30,000^{‡}
United Kingdom (BPI)	Silver	200,000^{‡}
United States (RIAA)	Gold	500,000^{‡}
^{‡} Sales+streaming figures based on certification alone.
