= Only If for a Night =

Song by Florence and the Machine

from the album Ceremonials
- Released: October 28, 2011
- Studio: Abbey Road Studio
- Genre: Orchestral pop; chamber pop; neo-soul; power pop
- Length: 4:58
- Label: Island
- Songwriters: Florence Welch; Paul Epworth
- Producer: Paul Epworth

"Only If for a Night" is a song by the English indie rock band Florence and the Machine from their second studio album Ceremonials. It was written by lead singer Florence Welch and producer Paul Epworth with production handled by Epworth. The band premiered the song during a concert at Brooklyn's Creators Project on 15 October 2011, prior to the release of the album, along with 5 other live debuts from the Ceremonials album. "Only If For A Night" is the opening track of the album, and is an orchestral pop infused neo soul song.

== Background ==
"Only If for a Night" is an emotionally powerful song that centres around the singer's deceased grandmother, who died by suicide in New York City when the singer was 14. It explores themes of spiritual visitation, practical advice from the afterlife and grief. The song was premiered on 15 October 2011, 13 days before the albums release, in Brooklyn. It served as the opener for the concert and the opening track on the album, which also explores themes of religion, drowning, spiritualism, etc.

== Lyrics ==
The song mainly describes Florence Welch's deceased grandmother who died from suicide. The line "And she was there all pink and gold and glittering / I threw my arms around her legs / Came to weeping" describe a vivid dream she had as a child of her grandmother after her death. The song was overall inspired by the ideas of spiritual visitation from the deceased, in this case, her grandmother. The song's titular line "Only If for a Night" describes how the only chance she has to see her grandmother is via dreams, and how visceral the dream was. The line "And the grass was so green / Against my new clothes" refer to her black funeral clothes against the green grass. "And I heard your voice as clear as day / And you told me I should concentrate" refers to the visceral dream, when her grandmother told her to concentrate on her career, as stated by Welch in an interview with NME in 2011. Welch references Joan of Arc in the lines "And the only solution was to stand and fight / And my body was bruised and I was set alight / But you came over me like some holy rite / And although I was burning, you're the only light" idealising the image of the French warrior being burned at the stake. Finally, Welch states how surreal and strange it was that her grandmother's visitation was so practical and advisal, as referenced in the line "It was all so strange and so surreal / That a ghost should be so practical", expecting such a spiritual experience to be more cryptic. "Only If for a Night" is a chamber pop, neo soul, orchestral pop song featuring church bells, a string orchestra and choir backing vocals.

== Live performances ==
The song was debuted in Brooklyn at the Creators Project, along with 5 other Ceremonials songs, serving as the concerts opening song. Following its debut, the song was performed at the Hackney Empire on 25 October 2011 as a pre-release concert for the album. The two pre-release concerts were followed by the Ceremonials Tour throughout 2011-12. "Only If for a Night" served as the opener for 119 out of 121 shows on the tour. Since the tour, "Only If for a Night" was performed on many shows on the How Big, How Blue & How Beautiful Tours and performed on almost every stop of the High as Hope Tour.
