= Shake It Out =

2011 single by Florence + the Machine

Single by Florence + the Machine

from the album Ceremonials
- B-side: "Shake It Out (The Weeknd Remix)"
- Released: 14 September 2011
- Recorded: 2010–2011
- Studio: Abbey Road Studios, London
- Genre: Baroque pop; gothic rock; gospel
- Length: {{unbulleted list|4:37
- Label: Island
- Songwriters: Florence Welch; Paul Epworth
- Producer: Paul Epworth

Florence + the Machine singles chronology
| "Heavy in Your Arms" (2010) | "Shake It Out" (2011) | "No Light, No Light" (2012) |

Music video
- "Shake It Out" on YouTube

"Shake It Out" is a song by English indie rock band Florence and the Machine, released as the first official single from their second studio album, Ceremonials (2011). It was written by Florence Welch and Paul Epworth, while production was handled by Epworth. The song was digitally released in Australia on 14 September 2011, and it was available in the United States on 19 October. It had its radio debut on XFM on 14 September 2011 in the United Kingdom. Welch revealed that the song was written within an hour and according to her it talked about shaking the regrets and the things that were haunting her.

"Shake It Out" is a gothic pop song with gospel elements which contains organs, bells, and tambourines as its main instrumentation. The song received acclaim from music critics who praised Welch's vocals and its anthemic nature. An accompanying music video for the song premiered on 19 October 2011 and it was directed by Dawn Shadforth. It showed Welch attending an old party in England, evoking references to Eyes Wide Shut. It received acclaim from critics who praised its imagery and compared it to videos by Annie Lennox and Madonna.

"Shake It Out" was nominated for the Best Pop Duo/Group Performance at the 55th Annual Grammy Awards. It was featured on the television series How I Met Your Mother, at the end of the episode "No Pressure".

== Background ==
"Shake It Out" was written by Florence Welch and Paul Epworth, while production was handled by Epworth. The song was recorded in London at Abbey Road Studios where the whole second album was finished. On 14 September 2011, Florence Welch went to XFM to premiere Florence and the Machine's second single from their second upcoming album Ceremonials. Welch elaborated the songwriting process of the song adding that it can be compared to a really good hangover cure. She stated, "I wanted to just shake something out, shake out these regrets, shake out these things that haunt you. It was one of those songs that came in about half an hour and when you've got a hangover, it is almost like a hangover cure. You're like, thank you! I don't want everyone to think that I always write songs with a hangover! Cause I don't, I really don't. But with this one I have to say there was a bit of one lurking in my mind as I wrote it. It was like I was trying to write a hangover cure." During an interview with MTV News she described the recording process:

"I think I came to the studio with a bit of a hangover, and it was one of those strange days where you're not really sure where a song comes from. [Producer] Paul [Epworth] just had these chords on the organ, and they sounded optimistic and sad at the same time. And I was thinking of regrets, like, you know when you feel like you're stuck in yourself, you keep repeating certain patterns of behavior, and you kind of want to cut out that part of you and restart yourself. [...] So this song was kind of like, 'Shake yourself out of it, things will be OK,'. [Because] sometimes I have to write songs for myself, reminding me to let it go. But then, the end refrain of 'What the hell' is really important as well, because you'll dance with the devil again at some point, and maybe it will be fun. I've heard he does a really good foxtrot."

Welch also said that "Shake It Out" was a "... magic one. I feel weird because I'm always talking about how I'm writing songs when I'm hung over most of the songs weren't but 'Shake It Out' was. Like 'Cosmic Love' (it was) written when you're not feeling too great. It became the ultimate hangover cure, and then it became about something bigger. Like trying to get rid of 'hangover ghouls'."

== Composition ==
"Shake It Out" is a four-and-a-half-minute baroque pop song which contains "swelling, gospel-flavored pop, with churchy organ and pounding drums setting a cathartic scene for Welch's fiery singing" in the lines "It's hard to dance with the devil on your back. So shake him off!" Digital Spy's Robert Copsey stated: "earthy drums are dressed with bells and tambourines before Flo chants 'Shake it out, shake it out, ooh-waaoah!' on the song's anthemic and dangerously addictive chorus." Consequence of Sound's Alex Young concluded that the song "takes approximately 37 seconds to build up before a pulsating drum enters". AllMusic's James Christopher Monger commented that when the swelling guitars, organs, and strings, staccato percussion, and Florence Welch's "air-raid siren of a voice" start in the song, begins a "battle over which one is going to launch itself into the stratosphere first." In the song, Welch sings about dancing with a devil in the lyrics "It's hard to dance with a devil on your back". Lewis Corner of Digital Spy found references to "exorcism of demons and regrets with a backdrop of village church organs and ritualistic thuds and jingles courtesy", while Ryan Dombal of Pitchfork Media found lyrics talking about "getting past one's troubles."

Rolling Stone's Jody Rosen wrote, "'Shake It Out' is a treatise on heartbreak and spiritual rebirth. I am done with my graceless heart/So tonight I'm gonna cut it out and then restart, she cries, over guitars and keyboards that heave and chime. This is the sound of a human turbine – a wind machine." In his review of Ceremonials, Rob Harvilla of Spin wrote: "Consider rapturous call to arms 'Shake It Out,' a feast of droning organs and concussive drums that begins as an assassination/martyrdom attempt, throwing Flo to the clichés instead of the lions: 'It's always darkest before the dawn,' 'Damned if I do and damned if I don't,' 'At the end of my rope,' 'It's a shot in the dark,' and all-time Catholic-hymn classic 'It's hard to dance with a devil on your back.' Yet she rips the throat out of every line with that bazooka alto, turns even the banalities into profundities."

== Release and remixes ==
After the interview with XFM, "Shake It Out" had its first spin on the same radio. The song was digitally released in Australia on 14 September 2011 and in the United Kingdom on 2 October. Monte Lipman a CEO of Florence and the Machine's label, Universal Republic Records, described the song as "an anthem in every gym in America a year from now." Due for domestic release on 11 October, "Shake It Out" has been serviced to Top 40, triple A, alternative and R&B formats. The cover art for the vinyl release of the single was photographed by Karl Lagerfeld. Welch is seen "lying seductively against a grey backdrop dressed in a white sequinned dress teamed with lashings of red lipstick and smoky eyes" as stated by a writer of The Belfast Telegraph.

A remix of the song was made by The Weeknd, a Canadian R&B singer. Two weeks after Florence and the Machine announced The Weeknd's remix through their official website, Zane Lowe's Radio 1 show debuted the song on 26 September. Spin's Marc Hogan wrote that the remix had a "predictably sultry-yet-creepy results" and added that it "converts the sacred into the profane, warping Welch's distinctly pure voice and surrounding it with his signature goth-R&B slither. 'It's hard to dance with the devil on your back,' indeed."

Phil Udell of State magazine concluded that the remix "certainly does add a new dimension to what's already a great track, it's still very much the latter who dominates. We'd have like to hear more of The Weeknd himself, but there's still no doubt that this will up his stock no end…" A writer of New York magazine wrote: "anyway, the result is not that creepy! Fans of Florence's uptempo original may be weirded out by the moody, heavily filtered take; meanwhile, Weeknd devotees may be a little disappointed to learn that Tesfaye doesn't sing on the track. But let's meet in the middle here: The Weeknd gets his woozy beats and whistling, but Florence keeps her vocals. The result is a sneakily listenable track that should make everyone at your folk-R&B-fusion meet-up group reasonably happy. And there is, of course, always the original to fall back on." Carrie Battan of Pitchfork Media said:

"The original version of Florence and the Machine's new single is characteristically anthemic-- the huge drum hits and Florence Welch's full-bodied voice sound like a cinematic peptalk. But the trademark moody touches from the Weeknd on the remixed version unearth the song's despairing core. The pace is slackened, chorus muddied, and big, echoing caves are carved into the instrumentation. Abel Tesfaye's falsetto is nowhere to be found, but it doesn't matter-- he could've easily written these words himself. "I like to keep my issues strong/ It's always darkest before the dawn," Welch sings. And after a few listens, it begins to sound like she and the tortured, drugged-out Tesfaye have a few things in common."

== Critical reception ==
"Still, 'Shake It Out' will definitely be the 'Dog Days Are Over' this time around. Florence Welch navigates through pulsing organs and a maze of clichés, adding her own dark twist to the familiar sayings ('I’m always dragging that horse around… Tonight I’m gonna bury that horse in the ground'). The song culminates in an ecstatic, explosive chorus, encouraging you to shake off that 'devil on your back.' It's a joyous, life-affirming single that hits all the right notes, both musically and emotionally. Hope you all enjoy this song; you’ll be hearing it about a thousand more times over the next year."

— Joe Marvilli of the website Consequence of Sound talking about "Shake It Out"

"Shake It Out" received widespread critical acclaim. A writer of The Huffington Post called the song "a pitch-perfect end-of-summer anthem" and concluded, "seriously, if you can get something like this out of a hangover, more power to you." A writer of The Guardian wrote that "Shake It Out" had a "quiet-to-loud-louder-really-quite-loud dynamic" and said that it was perfect for a winner of The X Factor. Writing for the magazine Dose, Leah Collins compared the song with the band's previous single "What the Water Gave Me" (2011) and called it "bombastic, humming with church-organ, jangling with tambourine and booming with Florence Welch's cannon-blast voice." Spinner's Theo Spielberg praised the song saying, "beginning with a sweeping organ the song quickly hits its stride, spreads its wings and settles comfortably into a stadium-sized atmosphere." He further concluded, "that you can imagine hearing it on Glee as much as NME Radio is enough to already deem this a future classic." Laura Foster of Clash magazine wrote that the song was one of the six "massive" anthems on Ceremonials and praised the "power balladry".

Alex Young of the website Consequence of Sound praised the anthemic nature of the song and concluded that the "sing-a-long-approved chorus takes over and it keeps you under its spell for the remaining three minutes." Barry Nicolson of NME concluded that the chorus of the song "announces itself with a sudden, overpowering immensity akin to sheets of ice being atomised by a ruddy great hammer. It's as though indie's self-styled Lady of Shalott has discovered how to emote through a bullhorn." Richard Smirke of Billboard called the song "a rousing pop-rock number in the spirit of 'Dog Days Are Over'". Jillian Mapes of the same publication commented: "Welch's goth-pop allure is summed up in the chorus of the album's dramatic first single: 'It's hard to dance with the devil on your back, so shake him off.'" Matthew Cole of Slant Magazine noted that the first four songs on the album were the best ones including the "instantly gratifying anthem 'Shake It Out'."

Pitchfork Media's Carrie Battan chose the song as a "Best New Track" and added that it's "even more massively anthemic than the already-anthemic singles off Lungs. Huge drum hits drive the track from the onset, and Welch's voice is in peak form throughout, nearly spilling over the edge as of the song. She clearly has a lot of weapons at her disposal, but 'Shake It Out' reveals pure adrenaline as her most powerful." Robert Copsey of Digital Spy praised the song calling it "a perfect introduction to the LP." In another review of the song he wrote: "'Shake it out, shake it out, ooh woaaah!' she belts over crashing symbols and glittery synths on the chorus; the result, a good ol'-fashioned knees-up of a song that wouldn't sound out of place in an East London pub or the McKinley High stage." Will Hermes of Rolling Stone called the song "mighty" and compared Welch's vocals with Glinda the Good Witch. Entertainment Weekly's Kyle Anderson commented that "Welch's soul is constantly in peril here, forcing her to dance away from devils" in the "swinging, jubilant" song. Andy Gill of The Independent, and Lewis Corner of Digital Spy, put the song in their lists of songs to download from Ceremonials. Kitty Empire of The Observer wrote that Welch's vocals sound "multitracked, and are augmented by a chorus of friends."

=== Recognition ===
On the Triple J Hottest 100 list, "Shake It Out" was ranked at number thirteen. On Slant Magazine's year-end list of Best Singles of 2011, "Shake It Out" was ranked at number thirteen. The writers of the website further commented, "If lyrics about freedom, overcoming regrets that have been collected 'like old friends here to relive your darkest moments,' and the simple truth that it's hard to dance with a devil on your back doesn't move you, then perhaps the final 60 seconds of 'Shake It Out' will, which forsakes language altogether and builds to a cacophony of bone-rattling organ, tribal percussion, and intersecting vocal parts that find Florence Welch finally succumbing to her demons and having drinks in the dark at the end of the road with the rest of us." At the 2012 NME Awards on 29 February 2012, "Shake It Out" won in the category for Best Track. At the 2013 Grammy Awards, the song was nominated in the category of Best Pop Duo/Group Performance. In 2019, Pitchfork ranked the song as the 174th best song of the 2010s.

== Chart performance ==
The song debuted at number 36 on the Billboard Adult Pop Songs chart on 22 November 2011. On the Billboard Hot 100 chart, "Shake It Out" peaked at number 72 for the week ending 18 March 2012. The single became Florence and the Machine's fourth top twenty single in the UK Singles Chart after "Rabbit Heart (Raise It Up), "You've Got the Love and "You've Got the Dirtee Love". It has sold over a million digital copies in the US as of October 2012. The single reached number 12 in the United Kingdom in 2011 and as of July 2018 it has shifted 598,000 copies, combining streaming and sales. 25 million have streamed this since records began in 2014. In Ireland, the song proved to be a success, peaking at number two on the Irish Singles Chart and remaining on the chart for 49 weeks.

== Music video ==
On 3 October 2011, the music video for "Shake It Out" premiered on the band's official YouTube channel. It features Welch wearing a red gown and singing while attending a 1920s-era masked ball, evoking references to works such as Eyes Wide Shut, The Great Gatsby, and "The Lady of Shalott". Welch described the video saying, "Think of a psychedelic 1920s dress party with a demonic twist. Possession meets The Great Gatsby." She further described the direction of the video "We were kind of going for a sort of 'Gatsby at West Egg'-style house party but with maybe slightly ritualistic and sort of satanic undertones and séances. That was such a fun video to shoot, for me especially, because I had all my friends down there, and they all came and we all got to dress up and do a casual séance in this beautiful art-deco mansion. It's basically a party house; there's one room which was purely just for cutting flowers. My best friend is sitting with me in the tree at the end of the video, and we just got to hang out in a tree for a while. It was really fun." It was directed by Dawn Shadforth who previously directed the video for "Drumming Song" and it was shot at the Eltham Palace, London.

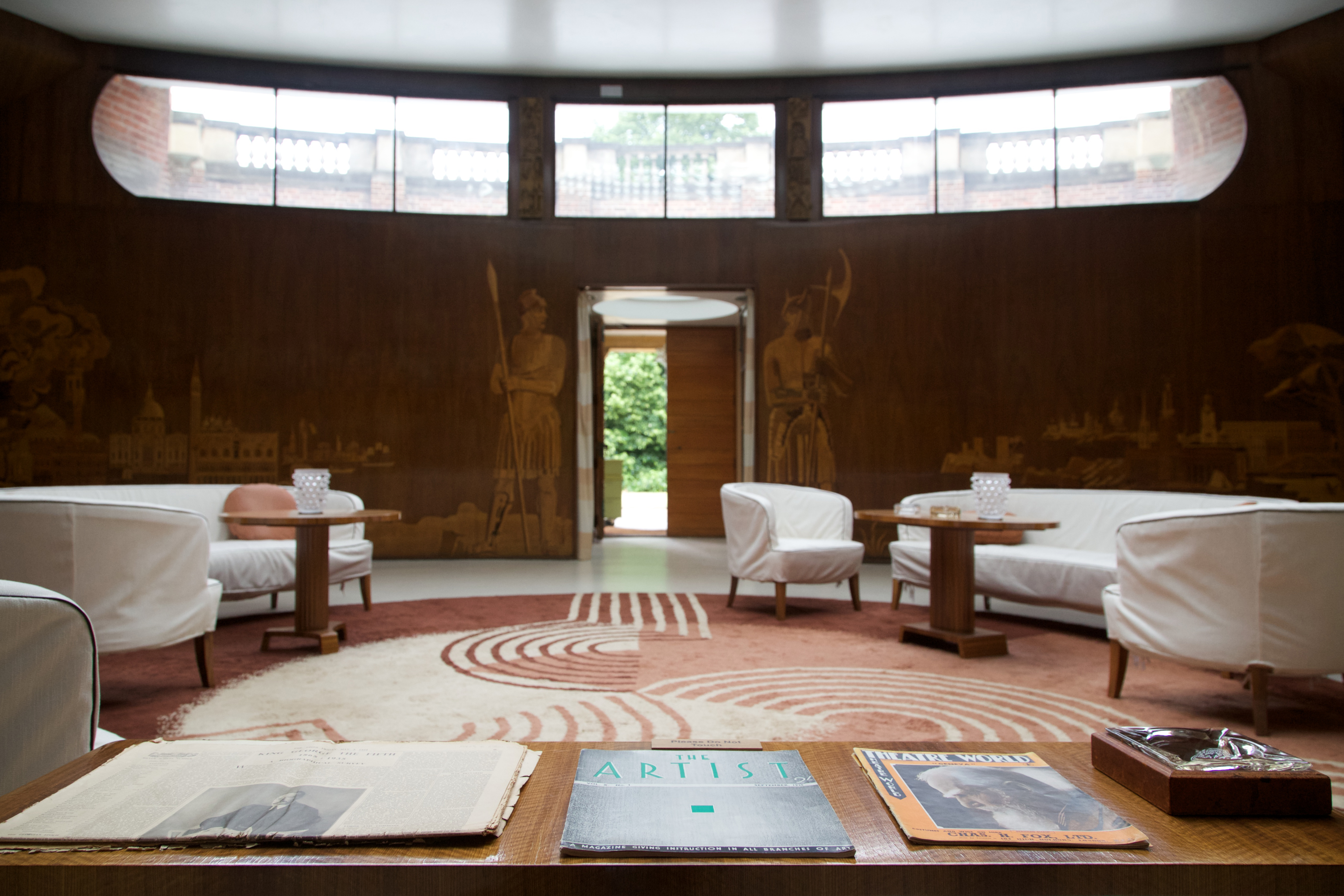
Parts of Eltham Palace including the entrance hall,

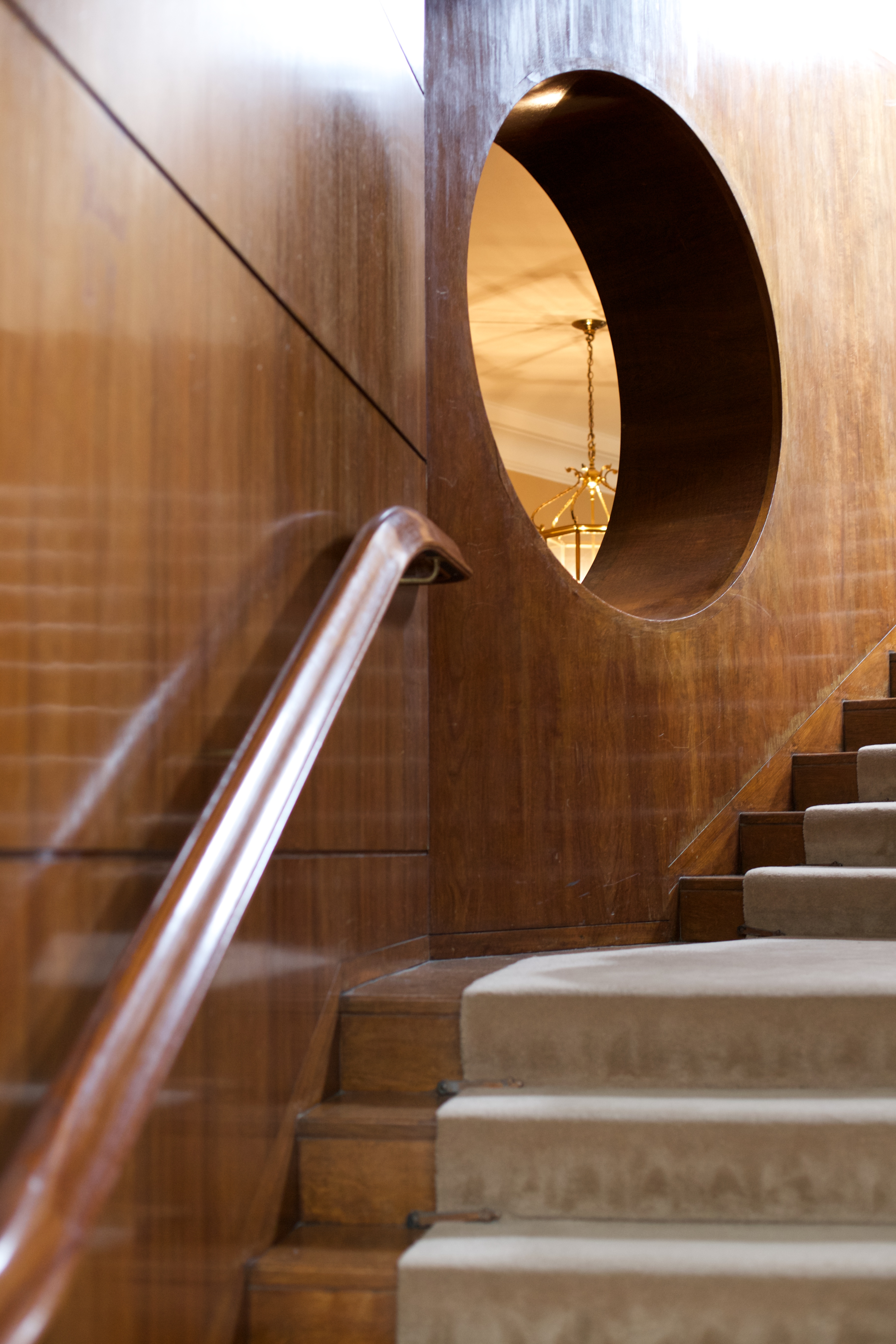
the staircase,

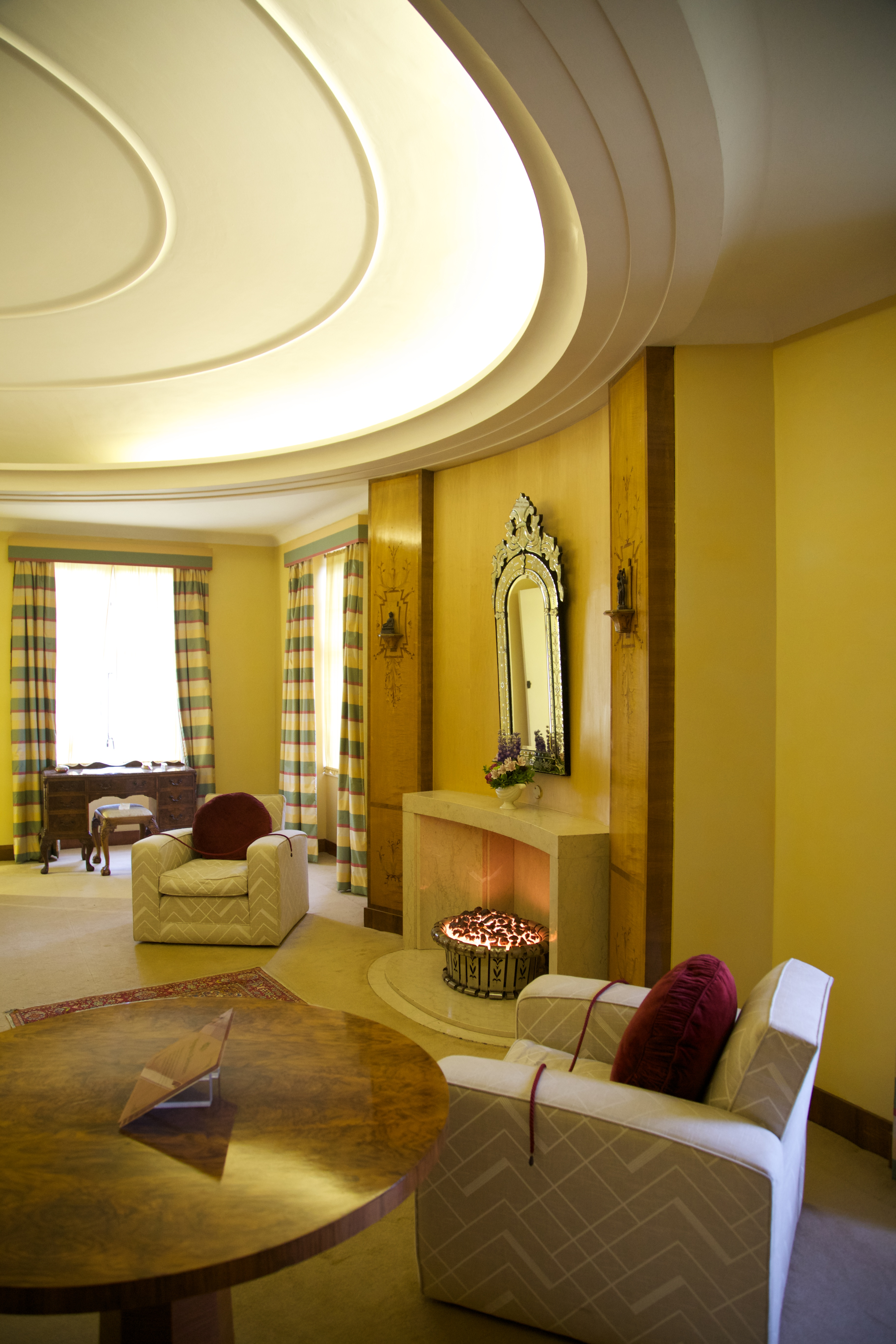
and Virginia Courtauld's bedroom were used for filming.

Michael Roffman of the website Consequence of Sound, compared the video with the work by Madonna because of "the hazy cinematography and the choir-like theatrics." Entertainment Weekly's Kyle Anderson praised the video calling it a "five-minute technicolor blast" and praised the fashion used in it as well as the references to Eyes Wide Shut. Andrew Martin of Prefix Magazine wasn't satisfied with the video saying "the track's music video is still an over-the-top affair filled with Old World imagery and glitter-covered dresses and suits. But it's not quite as outrageous as it could have been, even if things do get really dramatic at times. I guess I was picturing something more arena-sized, though maybe that's because the track is so goddamn huge." RJ Cubarrubia of Billboard wrote that "although the video feels somewhat dark and mystical, like a secret society meeting with unsettling masks and a slightly possessed Welch, the vibe is ultimately joyful and inspiring, with the party guests and Welch visibly bursting with happiness by the video's end."

Larry Fitzmaurice of Pitchfork Media said, "the video is cinematic and features a really weird party where people are wearing masks." Katie Hasty of HitFix compared the video with the works by Annie Lennox and added that "the imagery will leave a mark on fans and aspiring fans to boot." Leah Collins of Dose also compared the video with Annie Lennox's "Walking on Broken Glass". Spin's Marc Hogan wrote, "the video doesn't have the clearest plot, [but] it does depict Florence Welch dancing with masked, formally attired men, a visual that sparks comparisons to the posh orgy of Stanley Kubrick's film Eyes Wide Shut, but a bacchanal does not break out. Instead, a white-dressed Welch escapes to the woods, while a red-dressed one parties inside with some seriously creepy people. 'I'm damned if I do, and I'm damned if I don't,' she sings."

== Live performances ==
The band performed "Shake It Out" on 6 November 2011 during the eighth season of the British show The X Factor. They also sang the song on The X Factor Australia on 15 November and on France's La Musicale on Canal+ on 18 November. Later, on 19 November 2011, they performed the song on Saturday Night Live. "Shake It Out" was also performed on Good Morning America on 21 November 2011.

== Track listing ==
Digital download
| No. | Title | Length |
|---|---|---|
| 1. | "Shake It Out" | 4:37 |

UK iTunes EP
| No. | Title | Length |
|---|---|---|
| 1. | "Shake It Out" | 4:37 |
| 2. | "Shake It Out" (The Weeknd Remix) | 5:17 |
| 3. | "Shake It Out" (Benny Benassi Remix Edit) | 3:22 |
| 4. | "Shake It Out" (Benny Benassi Remix) | 5:35 |

Limited 12" vinyl and Limited Record Store Day 7" single
| No. | Title | Length |
|---|---|---|
| 1. | "Shake It Out" | 4:37 |
| 2. | "Shake It Out" (The Weeknd Remix) | 5:17 |

== Charts ==
=== Weekly charts ===
| Chart (2011–12) | Peak position |
|---|---|
| Australia (ARIA) | 36 |
| Austria (Ö3 Austria Top 40) | 16 |
| Belgium (Ultratip Bubbling Under Flanders) | 2 |
| Belgium (Ultratip Bubbling Under Wallonia) | 15 |
| Canada Hot 100 (Billboard) | 52 |
| Germany (GfK) | 30 |
| Ireland (IRMA) | 2 |
| Japan Hot Overseas (Billboard) | 2 |
| New Zealand (Recorded Music NZ) | 16 |
| Norway (VG-lista) | 18 |
| Scottish Singles Sales (Official Charts) | 10 |
| Sweden (Sverigetopplistan) | 50 |
| Switzerland (Schweizer Hitparade) | 23 |
| UK Singles (Official Charts) | 12 |
| US Billboard Hot 100 | 72 |
| US Adult Alternative Airplay (Billboard) | 1 |
| US Adult Pop Airplay (Billboard) | 20 |
| US Alternative Airplay (Billboard) | 11 |
| US Dance Club Songs (Billboard) | 4 |
| US Hot Rock & Alternative Songs (Billboard) | 9 |

=== Year-end charts ===
| Chart (2011) | Position |
|---|---|
| UK Singles (Official Charts Company) | 158 |

| Chart (2012) | Position |
|---|---|
| US Alternative Songs (Billboard) | 41 |
| US Hot Rock Songs (Billboard) | 35 |

== Certifications ==
| Region | Certification | Certified units/sales |
|---|---|---|
| Australia (ARIA) | 3× Platinum | 210,000^{‡} |
| Brazil (Pro-Música Brasil) | 2× Platinum | 120,000^{‡} |
| Denmark (IFPI Danmark) | Gold | 45,000^{‡} |
| Germany (BVMI) | Gold | 150,000^{‡} |
| Italy (FIMI) | Gold | 25,000^{‡} |
| New Zealand (RMNZ) | 3× Platinum | 90,000^{‡} |
| Portugal (AFP) | Gold | 10,000^{‡} |
| Spain (Promusicae) | Gold | 30,000^{‡} |
| United Kingdom (BPI) | 2× Platinum | 1,200,000^{‡} |
| United States (RIAA) | 3× Platinum | 3,000,000^{‡} |
^{‡} Sales+streaming figures based on certification alone.

== Release history ==
| Country | Release date | Format | Label |
|---|---|---|---|
| Australia | 14 September 2011 | Digital download | Island |
| United Kingdom | 30 September 2011 | Digital download | Island |
| United States | 11 October 2011 | Digital download | Island |
