= Breath of Life (Florence and the Machine song) =

2012 single by Florence and the Machine

Single by Florence + the Machine

from the album Snow White and the Huntsman: Original Motion Picture Soundtrack
- Released: 26 April 2012
- Recorded: 2011
- Genre: Gothic rock, orchestral rock
- Length: 4:08
- Label: Island
- Songwriters: Florence Welch; Isabella Summers
- Producer: Isabella Summers

Florence + the Machine singles chronology
| "Never Let Me Go" (2012) | "Breath of Life" (2012) | "Spectrum (Say My Name)" (2012) |

Music video
- "Breath of Life" on YouTube

Audio sample
- file; help

"Breath of Life" is a song by English indie rock band Florence and the Machine, recorded exclusively for the film Snow White and the Huntsman (2012). The song was cowritten and produced by Isabella Summers and orchestrated by James Newton Howard. It was released on 26 April 2012 on iTunes. "Breath of Life" peaked at number eighty-seven on the UK Singles Chart and was nominated for the World Soundtrack Award for Best Original Song Written Directly for a Film.

== Critical reception ==
"Breath of Life" received positive reviews from music critics. Jon Dolan of Rolling Stone gave the song three-and-a-half out of five stars, stating it is "Flo at her most toweringly gothed-out. All doom-drum rush and endless-midnight orchestral sweep, it sounds like it was produced by Sauron the Dark Lord of Mordor—but in a good way. The wintry tumult sets the stage for a display of primal vocal acrobatics and white-knuckled emoting." Priya Ellan from NME praise the song "Those resounding, tribal drums are paired up a Greek Chorus of backing vocalists (a 60 piece choir it turns out!). These elements, plus the searching orchestration, give the track a widescreen depth and are, you'd imagine, an appropriately faux-gothic addition to a film about Snow White starring one of the Twilight cast. The bridge finds Florence's vocals blending with the phalanx of voices (appropriate for the "all the choirs in my head,") lyric. If she's set to continue down this path of musical bombast, it feels like the next logical step for her to take".

== Music video ==
A music video for "Breath of Life" was directed by Scott Murray and premiered on YouTube on 14 May 2012. The video shows Florence in the studio singing the song as well as clips from Snow White and the Huntsman. The video has received a nomination for Best Video from a Film at the 2013 MTV Video Music Awards Japan.

== Charts ==
| Chart (2012) | Peak position |
|---|---|
| Australia (ARIA) | 57 |
| Austria (Ö3 Austria Top 40) | 64 |
| France (SNEP) | 143 |
| Germany (GfK) | 65 |
| Ireland (IRMA) | 68 |
| Scottish Singles Sales (Official Charts) | 91 |
| UK Singles (Official Charts) | 87 |
| US Bubbling Under Hot 100 (Billboard) | 11 |

== Release history ==
| Region | Date | Label | Format |
|---|---|---|---|
| United States | 26 April 2012 | Universal Republic Records | Digital download |
| Australia | 27 April 2012 | Universal Music | Digital download |
| Germany | 27 April 2012 | Universal Music | Digital download |
| United Kingdom | 27 April 2012 | Island Records | Digital download |
