= List of awards and nominations received by Florence and the Machine =

Florence and the Machine awards and nominations
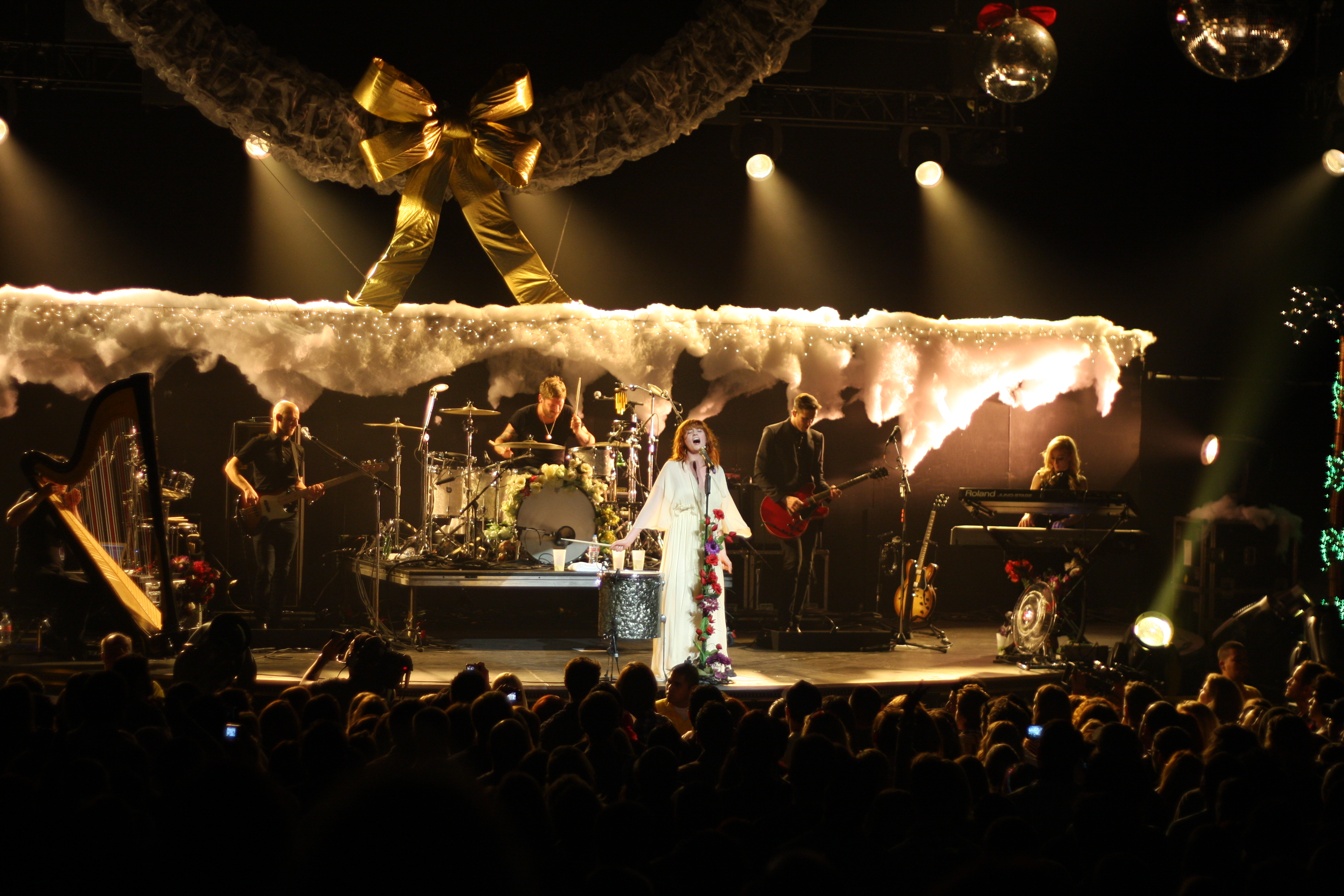
- Florence and the Machine performing at KROQ Almost Acoustic Christmas in December 2010
Awards and nominations
Award	Wins	Nominations
ARIA Music Awards	0	1
BBC Music Awards	0	2
Billboard Music Awards	0	2
Brit Awards	2	10
Camerimage	0	3
Hollywood Music in Media Awards	0	1
Grammy Awards	0	7
Mercury Prize	0	4
MTV Europe Music Awards	0	4
MTV Video Music Awards	1	7
MTV Video Music Awards Japan	0	1
NME Awards	3	9
Q Awards	3	9
UK Festival Awards	2	6
UK Music Video Awards	4	20
Other awards	10	33

Totals (Note: Certain award groups do not simply award one winner. They acknowledge several different recipients, have runners-up, and have third place. Since this is a specific recognition and is different from losing an award, runner-up mentions are considered wins in this award tally. For simplification and to avoid errors, each award in this list has been presumed to have had a prior nomination.)
- Wins: 25
- Nominations: 115

English indie rock band Florence and the Machine has won 24 awards out of 107 nominations. In 2011 they released "Dog Days Are Over", the single was a commercial success and was nominated for two awards at the 2011 Billboard Music Awards and the music video for the song was nominated for four awards at the 2010 MTV Video Music Awards, including Video of the Year, and won for Best Art Direction. At the 53rd Annual Grammy Awards they received their first Grammy nomination which was for Best New Artist. They have won two out of eight Brit Awards nominations, the Critics' Choice in 2009 and for British Album of the Year for Lungs in 2010. At the 55th Annual Grammy Awards their album Ceremonials earned them two nominations, Grammy Award for Best Pop Vocal Album for the album and Grammy Award for Best Pop Duo/Group Performance for "Shake It Out", the first single of the album. While at the 58th Annual Grammy Awards their album How Big, How Blue, How Beautiful earned them three more nominations, Best Pop Vocal Album for the album, Best Pop Duo/Group Performance for "Ship to Wreck", the second single of the album and Best Rock Performance for "What Kind of Man", the lead single of the album.

== ARIA Music Awards ==
Year	Category	Nominated work	Result	Ref.
2012	Best International Artist	Florence + The Machine	Nominated	

== BBC Sound Of ==
Year	Category	Nominated work	Result	Ref.
2009	Sound of 2009	Herself	Third	

== BBC Music Awards ==
Year	Category	Nominated work	Result	Ref.
2015	British Artist of the Year	Florence + The Machine	Nominated	
2015	Live Performance of the Year	Florence + The Machine	Nominated	

== Billboard Music Awards ==
The Billboard Music Awards are held to honor artists for commercial performance in the U.S., based on record charts published by Billboard. The band has been nominated twice.

Year	Category	Nominated work	Result	Ref.
2011	Top Rock Song	"Dog Days Are Over"	Nominated	
2011	Top Alternative Song	"Dog Days Are Over"	Nominated	

== Brit Awards ==
The Brit Awards are the British Phonographic Industry's (BPI) annual pop music awards. Florence and the Machine has received two awards from twelve nominations.

Year	Category	Nominated work	Result	Ref.
2009	Critics' Choice	Florence and the Machine	Won	
2010	British Female Solo Artist	Florence and the Machine	Nominated	
2010	British Breakthrough Act	Florence and the Machine	Nominated	
2010	British Album of the Year	Lungs	Won	
2011	British Single of the Year	"You've Got the Love"	Nominated	
2012	British Female Solo Artist	Florence and the Machine	Nominated	
2012	British Album of the Year	Ceremonials	Nominated	
2013	British Single of the Year	"Spectrum (Say My Name)"	Nominated	
2016	British Female Solo Artist	Florence and the Machine	Nominated	
2016	British Album of the Year	How Big, How Blue, How Beautiful	Nominated	
2019	British Album of the Year	High as Hope	Nominated	
2019	British Female Solo Artist	Florence and the Machine	Nominated	

== Camerimage ==
Camerimage is a Polish film festival dedicated to the celebration of cinematography. The band has been nominated three times.

Year	Category	Nominated work	Result	Ref.
2010	Best Music Video	"Cosmic Love"	Nominated	
2015	Best Music Video	"What Kind of Man"	Nominated	
2018	Best Music Video	"Hunger"	Nominated	

== D&AD Awards ==
Design and Art Direction (D&AD) is a British educational charity which exists to promote excellence in design and advertising.

Year	Category	Nominated work	Result	Ref.
2019	Best Music Video	"Big God"	Nominated	

== GAFFA Awards ==
=== GAFFA Awards (Sweden) ===
Delivered since 2010, the GAFFA Awards (Swedish: GAFFA Priset) are a Swedish award that rewards popular music awarded by the magazine of the same name.

Year	Category	Nominated work	Result	Ref.
2019	Best Foreign Band	Themselves	Won	

== Grammy Awards ==
The Grammy Awards are awarded annually by the National Academy of Recording Arts and Sciences (NARAS). The band has received seven nominations.

Year	Category	Nominated work	Result	Ref.
2011	Best New Artist	Themselves	Nominated	
2013	Best Pop Vocal Album	Ceremonials	Nominated	
2013	Best Pop Duo/Group Performance	"Shake It Out"	Nominated	
2016	Best Pop Duo/Group Performance	"Ship to Wreck"	Nominated	
2016	Best Rock Performance	"What Kind of Man"	Nominated	
2016	Best Pop Vocal Album	How Big, How Blue, How Beautiful	Nominated	
2023	Best Alternative Music Performance	"King"	Nominated	

Note: "What Kind of Man" was nominated for Best Rock Song in 2016, which are only presented to the songwriter of the song, John Hill, Tom Hull and Florence Welch.

== Hollywood Music in Media Awards ==
The Hollywood Music in Media Awards honors music in film, television, video games, commercials, and trailers.

Year	Category	Nominated work	Result	Ref.
2016	Best Song - Sci-Fi/Fantasy Film	"Wish That You Were Here"	Nominated	

== Ivor Novello Awards ==
The Ivor Novello Awards are presented by The Ivors Academy to recognize the best in composing and songwriting.

Year	Category	Nominated work	Result	Ref.
2012	Best Song Musically and Lyrically	"Shake It Out"	Nominated	
2023	Best Song Musically and Lyrically	"King"	Won	
2026	Best Song Musically and Lyrically	"Everybody Scream"	Nominated	

== Mercury Prize ==
Year	Category	Nominated work	Result	Ref.
2009	Album of the Year	Lungs	Nominated	
2015	Album of the Year	How Big, How Blue, How Beautiful	Nominated	
2018	Album of the Year	High as Hope	Nominated	
2026	Album of the Year	Everybody Scream	Nominated	

== MTV ==
=== MTV Europe Music Awards ===
The MTV Europe Music Awards was established in 1994 by MTV Europe to award the music videos from European and international artists. The band has been nominated four times.

Year	Category	Nominated work	Result	Ref.
2009	Best UK & Ireland Act	Florence and the Machine	Nominated	
2011	Best UK & Ireland Act	Florence and the Machine	Nominated	
2012	Best Alternative	Florence and the Machine	Nominated	
2015	Best Alternative	Florence and the Machine	Nominated	

=== MTV Video Music Awards ===
The MTV Video Music Awards was established in 1984 by MTV to award the music videos of the year. The band has won one out of seven nominations.

Year	Category	Nominated work	Result	Ref.
2010	Video of the Year	"Dog Days Are Over"	Nominated	
2010	Best Rock Video	"Dog Days Are Over"	Nominated	
2010	Best Art Direction	"Dog Days Are Over"	Won	
2010	Best Cinematography	"Dog Days Are Over"	Nominated	
2015	Best Rock Video	"Ship to Wreck"	Nominated	
2016	Breakthrough Long Form Video	The Odyssey	Nominated	
2016	Best Choreography	"Delilah"	Nominated	

=== MTV Video Music Awards Japan ===
Year	Category	Nominated work	Result	Ref.
2013	Best Video from a Film	"Breath of Life" (from Snow White and the Huntsman)	Nominated	

== NME Awards ==
Year	Category	Nominated work	Result	Ref.
2010	Best Track	"Rabbit Heart (Raise It Up)"	Nominated	
2010	Best Dancefloor Filler	"You've Got the Love"	Nominated	
2010	Best Solo Artist	Florence and the Machine	Nominated	
2011	Best Solo Artist	Florence and the Machine	Nominated	
2012	Best Solo Artist	Florence and the Machine	Won	
2012	Best Track	"Shake It Out"	Won	
2013	Best Solo Artist	Florence and the Machine	Won	
2016	Best Solo Artist	Florence and the Machine	Nominated	
2016	Music Moment of the Year	Headline performance at Glastonbury music festival	Nominated	

== Q Awards ==
The Q Awards are the UK's annual music awards run by the music magazine Q.

Year	Category	Nominated work	Result	Ref.
2009	Best Album	Lungs	Nominated	
2009	Best Video	"Drumming Song"	Nominated	
2009	Best Breakthrough Artist	Florence and the Machine	Nominated	
2010	Best Female Artist	Florence and the Machine	Won	
2010	Best Track	"You've Got the Love"	Won	
2012	Best Track	"Shake It Out"	Nominated	
2015	Best Track	"What Kind Of Man"	Nominated	
2015	Best Video	"Ship To Wreck"	Won	
2015	Best Album	How Big How Blue How Beautiful	Nominated	
2018	Best Act in the World Today	Florence and the Machine	Nominated	
2019	Best Act in the World Today	Florence and the Machine	Nominated	
2019	Best Live Performance	Florence and the Machine	Nominated	
2019	Best Solo Artist	Florence and the Machine	Nominated	

== UK Festival Awards ==
Year	Category	Nominated work	Result	Ref.
2009	Best Breakthrough Act	Florence and the Machine	Won	
2009	Festival Fitty of the Year – Girls	Florence and the Machine	Nominated	
2009	Anthem of the Year	"Rabbit Heart (Raise It Up)"	Nominated	
2010	Anthem of the Year	"You've Got the Love"	Won	
2010	Feel-Good Act of the Summer	Florence and the Machine	Nominated	
2015	Best Headline Performance (Glastonbury)	Florence and the Machine	Nominated	

== UK Music Video Awards ==
Year	Category	Nominated work	Result	Ref.
2009	Best Pop Video	"Drumming Song"	Nominated	
2009	Best Styling	"Drumming Song"	Won	
2009	Best Styling	"Rabbit Heart (Raise It Up)"	Nominated	
2010	Best Styling	"Dog Days Are Over"	Nominated	
2010	Best Pop Video	"Dog Days Are Over"	Nominated	
2012	Best Editing	"Shake It Out"	Nominated	
2013	Best Alternative Video – UK	"Lover to Lover"	Nominated	
2013	Best Cinematography	"Lover to Lover"	Nominated	
2015	Best Artist	Themselves	Nominated	
2015	Best Rock/Indie Video	"Queen of Peace"	Nominated	
2015	Best Rock/Indie Video	"What Kind of Man"	Nominated	
2016	Best Choreography	"Delilah"	Won	
2018	Best Rock Video - UK	"Hunger"	Nominated	
2018	Best Rock Video - UK	"Big God"	Won	
2018	Best Styling	"Big God"	Nominated	
2018	Best Choreography	"Big God"	Won	
2018	Best Artist	Themselves	Nominated	
2022	Best Rock Video - UK	"King"	Nominated	
2022	Best Choreography in a Video	"Heaven is Here"	Nominated	

== Webby Awards ==
Year	Category	Nominated work	Result	Ref.
2019	Best Music Video	"Big God"	Won	

== Other awards ==
Year	Award	Category	Nominated work	Result
2009	Studio8 Media International Music Award	Female Voice of July 2009	Florence and the Machine	Won
2009	Studio8 Media International Music Award	Song of July 2009	"Rabbit Heart (Raise It Up)"	Won
2010	South Bank Show	South Bank Show Award	Florence and the Machine	Won
2010	Glamour Women of the Year Awards	Band of the Year	Florence and the Machine	Won
2010	D&AD Awards	Graphite Pencil	"Drumming Song"	Won
2010	Meteor Music Awards	Best International Album	Lungs	Nominated
2010	Meteor Music Awards	Best International Band	Florence and the Machine	Won
2010	Meteor Music Awards	Best International Live Performance	Florence and the Machine	Nominated
2010	Elle Style Awards	Musician of the Year	Florence and the Machine	Won
2010	MOJO Awards	Breakthrough Act	Florence and the Machine	Nominated
2010	MOJO Awards	Best Live Act	Florence and the Machine	Nominated
2010	MOJO Awards	Song of the Year	"You've Got the Love"	Nominated
2010	MOJO Awards	Best Album	Lungs	Nominated
2010	BT Digital Music Awards	Best Female Artist	Florence and the Machine	Nominated
2010	BT Digital Music Awards	Best Song	"You've Got the Love"	Nominated
2010	European Festival Awards	Anthem of the Year	"You've Got the Love"	Nominated
2010	European Festival Awards	Best Newcomer	Florence and the Machine	Won
2011	Virgin Media Music Awards	Best Collaboration	Florence and the Machine with Dizzee Rascal	Nominated
2011	Virgin Media Music Awards	Best Video	"Dog Days Are Over"	Nominated
2011	International Dance Music Awards	Best Alternative/Rock Dance Track	"Dog Days Are Over" (Yeasayer Remix)	Nominated
2011	International Dance Music Awards	Best Break-Through Artist (Group)	Florence and the Machine	Nominated
2011	Glamour Women of the Year Awards	Best Band	Florence and the Machine	Nominated
2012	Elle Style Awards	Best Music Act	Florence and the Machine	Won
2012	World Soundtrack Awards	Best Original Song Written Directly for a Film	"Breath of Life"	Nominated
2013	ECHO Awards	Best International Rock/Pop Group	Florence and the Machine	Nominated
2013	Spike Video Game Awards	Best Song in a Game	"I'm Not Calling You a Liar"	Nominated
2013	World Music Awards	World's Best Album	Ceremonials	Nominated
2013	World Music Awards	World's Best Group	Florence and the Machine	Nominated
2015	Live Music Business Awards	Best Festival Performance (Glastonbury)	Florence + The Machine	Nominated
2015	European Festival Awards	Headliner Of The Year	Florence + The Machine	Nominated
2015	European Festival Awards	Anthem of the Year	Ship To Wreck	Nominated
2016	Helpmann Awards	Best International Contemporary Music Concert	How Big, How Blue, How Beautiful Tour	Nominated
2016	NAVGTR Awards	Best Song, Original or Adapted	"Final Fantasy XV – “Stand By Me”	Won
2018	Global Awards	Best Indie	Florence + The Machine	Nominated
2019	Global Awards	Best Indie	Florence + The Machine	Nominated
2020	Global Awards	Best Indie	Florence + The Machine	Nominated
2021	World Soundtrack Awards	Best Original Song	Call Me Cruella	Won

== See also ==
- Florence Welch § Awards and nominations
