= How Big, How Blue, How Beautiful Tour =

2015–16 concert tours by Florence and the Machine

How Big Tour How Blue Tour How Beautiful Tour
- Tour by Florence + the Machine
- Promotional poster for the tour
- Associated album: How Big, How Blue, How Beautiful
- Start date: 9 September 2015
- End date: 3 July 2016
- Legs: 8
- No. of shows: 84
- Supporting acts: The Staves; The Ghost of a Saber Tooth Tiger; Jack Ladder & the Dreamlanders; Anderson .Paak; Grimes; Of Monsters and Men

Florence + the Machine concert chronology
- Ceremonials Tour (2011–12); How Big, How Blue, How Beautiful Tour (2015–16); High as Hope Tour (2018–19)

The How Big Tour, How Blue Tour and the How Beautiful Tour were a series of three concert tours by English indie band Florence and the Machine, in support of their third studio album, How Big, How Blue, How Beautiful. The tour began on 9 September 2015 in Belfast, Northern Ireland and concluded on 3 July 2016 in Werchter, Belgium at Rock Werchter.

== Set list ==
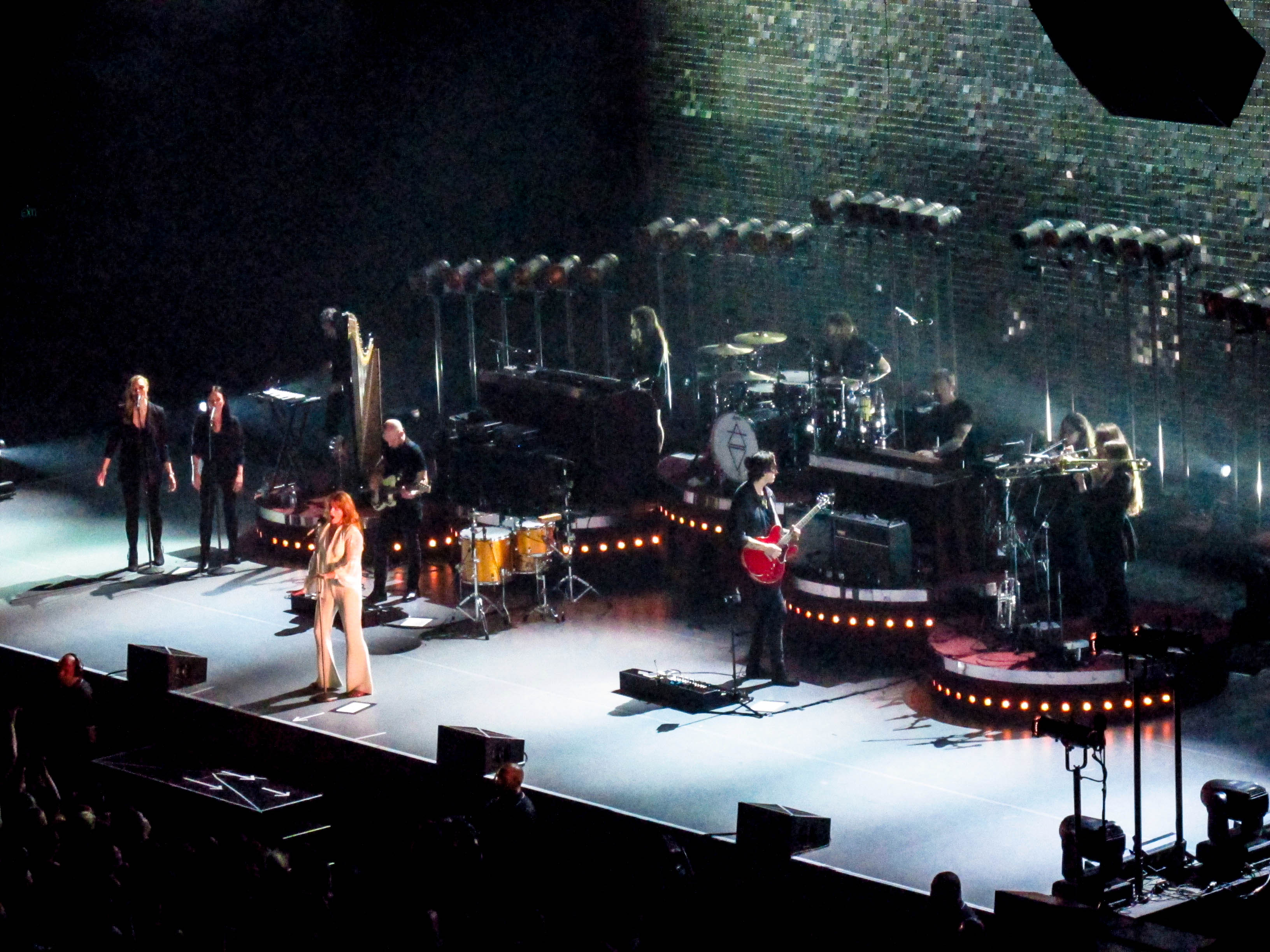
Florence and the Machine performing in Auckland, New Zealand on the Oceanian leg of the tour

=== Glastonbury Festival 2015 ===
Adapted from the BBC Music website.

1. "What the Water Gave Me"
2. "Ship to Wreck"
3. "Shake It Out"
4. "Rabbit Heart (Raise It Up)"
5. "Cosmic Love"
6. "Delilah"
7. "Sweet Nothing"
8. "Times Like These" (Foo Fighters cover)
9. "How Big, How Blue, How Beautiful"
10. "Queen of Peace"
11. "What Kind of Man"
12. "Drumming Song"
13. "Spectrum (Say My Name)"
14. "You've Got the Love"
15. "Dog Days Are Over"

=== 2015 Abu Dhabi Grand Prix ===
1. "What the Water Gave Me"
2. "Ship to Wreck"
3. "Rabbit Heart (Raise It Up)"
4. "Third Eye"
5. "Delilah"
6. "You've Got the Love"
7. "How Big, How Blue, How Beautiful"
8. "Shake It Out"
9. "Sweet Nothing"
10. "Queen of Peace"
11. "What Kind of Man"
12. "Spectrum (Say My Name)"
13. "Dog Days Are Over"
  Encore
14. "Mother"
15. "Drumming Song"

== Shows ==
List of concerts, showing date, city, country, venue and opening act
Date	City	Country	Venue	Opening act
Leg 1 – Europe
9 September 2015	Belfast	Ireland	The SSE Arena	The Staves
10 September 2015	Dublin	Ireland	3Arena	The Staves
12 September 2015	Sheffield	England	Sheffield Arena	The Staves
14 September 2015	Glasgow	Scotland	SSE Hydro	The Staves
15 September 2015	Newcastle	England	Metro Radio Arena	The Staves
17 September 2015	Nottingham	England	Motorpoint Arena Nottingham	The Staves
18 September 2015	Manchester	England	Manchester Arena	The Staves
19 September 2015	Birmingham	England	Genting Arena	The Staves
21 September 2015	London	England	Alexandra Palace	The Staves
22 September 2015	London	England	Alexandra Palace	The Staves
24 September 2015	London	England	Alexandra Palace	The Staves
25 September 2015	London	England	Alexandra Palace	The Staves
28 September 2015 (Note: The 28 September 2015 concert in London, England at The Roundhouse is a part of Apple Music Festival.)	London	England	The Roundhouse	The Staves
Leg 2 – North America
9 October 2015	Nashville	United States	Ascend Amphitheater	—N/a
11 October 2015 (Note: The 11 October 2015 concert in Austin, Texas at Zilker Park is a part of Austin City Limits Music Festival.)	Austin	United States	Zilker Park	—N/a
13 October 2015	Phoenix	United States	Ak-Chin Pavilion	—N/a
14 October 2015	San Diego	United States	Viejas Arena	—N/a
16 October 2015	Los Angeles	United States	Hollywood Bowl	The Ghost of a Saber Tooth Tiger
17 October 2015	Los Angeles	United States	Hollywood Bowl	The Ghost of a Saber Tooth Tiger
20 October 2015	Santa Barbara	United States	Santa Barbara Bowl	—N/a
21 October 2015	Berkeley	United States	Greek Theatre	—N/a
22 October 2015	Berkeley	United States	Greek Theatre	—N/a
24 October 2015	Portland	United States	Veterans Memorial Coliseum	—N/a
25 October 2015	Vancouver	Canada	Rogers Arena	—N/a
27 October 2015	Seattle	United States	KeyArena	—N/a
30 October 2015 (Note: The 30 October 2015 concert in New Orleans, Louisiana at City Park is a part of Voodoo Experience.)	New Orleans	United States	City Park	—N/a
Leg 3 – Oceania
7 November 2015	Perth	Australia	Perth Arena	Jack Ladder and the Dreamlanders
10 November 2015	Melbourne	Australia	Sidney Myer Music Bowl	Jack Ladder and the Dreamlanders
11 November 2015	Melbourne	Australia	Sidney Myer Music Bowl	Jack Ladder and the Dreamlanders
13 November 2015	Sydney	Australia	Sydney Opera House Forecourt	Jack Ladder and the Dreamlanders
14 November 2015	Sydney	Australia	Sydney Opera House Forecourt	Jack Ladder and the Dreamlanders
15 November 2015	Sydney	Australia	Sydney Opera House Forecourt	Jack Ladder and the Dreamlanders
17 November 2015	Sydney	Australia	Sydney Opera House Forecourt	Jack Ladder and the Dreamlanders
18 November 2015	Brisbane	Australia	Riverstage	Jack Ladder and the Dreamlanders
21 November 2015	Auckland	New Zealand	Vector Arena	Jack Ladder and the Dreamlanders
Leg 4 – Middle East
26 November 2015 (Note: The 26 November 2015 concert in Abu Dhabi, United Arab Emirates at Yas Marina Circuit is a part of 2015 Abu Dhabi Grand Prix.)	Abu Dhabi	United Arab Emirates	Du Arena	—N/a
Leg 5 – Europe
9 December 2015	Antwerp	Belgium	Sportpaleis	—N/a
10 December 2015	Amsterdam	Netherlands	Ziggo Dome	—N/a
12 December 2015	Łódź	Poland	Atlas Arena	—N/a
13 December 2015	Berlin	Germany	Velodrom	—N/a
14 December 2015	Hamburg	Germany	Barclaycard Arena	—N/a
16 December 2015	Munich	Germany	Olympiahalle	—N/a
18 December 2015	Düsseldorf	Germany	Mitsubishi Electric Halle	—N/a
19 December 2015	Zürich	Switzerland	Hallenstadion	—N/a
21 December 2015	Milan	Italy	Mediolanum Forum	—N/a
22 December 2015	Paris	France	Zénith Paris	—N/a
Leg 5 – South America
10 March 2016 (Note: The 10 March 2016 concert in Bogotá, Colombia at Parque Deportivo 222 is a part of Estéreo Picnic Festival.)	Bogotá	Colombia	Parque Deportivo 222	—N/a
12 March 2016 (Note: The 12 March 2016 concert in São Paulo, Brazil at Autódromo José Carlos Pace is a part of Lollapalooza Brazil.)	São Paulo	Brazil	Autódromo José Carlos Pace	—N/a
14 March 2016 (Note: The 14 March 2016 concert in Rio de Janeiro, Brazil at KM de Vantegens Hall was co-headlined with Mumford & Sons.)	Rio de Janeiro	Brazil	KM de Vantegens Hall	—N/a
18 March 2016 (Note: The 18 March 2016 concert in Buenos Aires, Argentina at Hipódromo de San Isidro is a part of Lollapalooza Argentina.)	Buenos Aires	Argentina	Hipódromo de San Isidro	—N/a
19 March 2016 (Note: The 19 March 2016 concert in Santiago, Chile at O'Higgins Park is a part of Lollapalooza Chile.)	Santiago	Chile	O'Higgins Park	—N/a
Leg 6 – Europe
12 April 2016	Vienna	Austria	Wiener Stadthalle	—N/a
13 April 2016	Bologna	Italy	Unipol Arena	—N/a
14 April 2016	Turin	Italy	Pala Alpitour	—N/a
16 April 2016	Barcelona	Spain	Palau Sant Jordi	—N/a
17 April 2016	Madrid	Spain	Palacio Vistalegre	—N/a
18 April 2016	Lisbon	Portugal	MEO Arena	—N/a
Leg 7 – North America
12 May 2016	Miami	United States	American Airlines Arena	Anderson .Paak
14 May 2016	Orlando	United States	Amway Center	Anderson .Paak
15 May 2016 (Note: The 15 May 2016 concert in Atlanta, Georgia at Centennial Olympic Park is a part of Shaky Knees Music Festival.)	Atlanta	United States	Centennial Olympic Park	—N/a
17 May 2016	The Woodlands	United States	Cynthia Woods Mitchell Pavilion	Grimes
18 May 2016	Dallas	United States	American Airlines Center	Grimes
19 May 2016	Austin	United States	Austin360 Amphitheater	Grimes
22 May 2016 (Note: The 22 May 2016 concert in Gulf Shores, Alabama at East Beach Boulevard is a part of Hangout Music Festival.)	Gulf Shores	United States	East Beach Boulevard	—N/a
24 May 2016	Bonner Springs	United States	Cricket Wireless Amphitheater	Grimes
26 May 2016	Denver	United States	Pepsi Center	Grimes
28 May 2016 (Note: The 28 May 2016 concert in Napa, California at Napa Valley Expo is a part of BottleRock Napa Valley.)	Napa	United States	Napa Valley Expo	—N/a
30 May 2016 (Note: The 30 May 2016 concert in George, Washington at The Gorge Amphitheatre is a part of Sasquatch! Music Festival.)	George	United States	The Gorge Amphitheatre	—N/a
2 June 2016	Saint Paul	United States	Xcel Energy Center	Of Monsters and Men
4 June 2016	Cuyahoga Falls	United States	Blossom Music Center	Of Monsters and Men
5 June 2016 (Note: The 5 June 2016 concert in Cincinnati, Ohio at Sawyer Point & Yeatman's Cove is a part of Bunbury Music Festival.)	Cincinnati	United States	Sawyer Point & Yeatman's Cove	Grimes; Of Monsters and Men
7 June 2016	Mansfield	United States	Xfinity Center	Of Monsters and Men
8 June 2016	Montreal	Canada	Bell Centre	Of Monsters and Men
10 June 2016	Toronto	Canada	Budweiser Stage	Of Monsters and Men
11 June 2016	Clarkston	United States	DTE Energy Music Theatre	Of Monsters and Men
12 June 2016	Tinley Park	United States	Hollywood Casino Amphitheatre	Of Monsters and Men
14 June 2016	Brooklyn	United States	Barclays Center	Grimes
15 June 2016	Brooklyn	United States	Barclays Center	Grimes
17 June 2016	Camden	United States	BB&T Pavilion	—N/a
18 June 2016 (Note: The 18 June 2016 in Dover, Delaware at The Woodlands of Dover International Speedway is a part of Firefly Music Festival.)	Dover	United States	The Woodlands of Dover International Speedway	—N/a
Leg 8 – Europe
21 June 2016 (Note: The 18 June 2016 concert in Zagreb, Croatia at Lake Jarun is a part of InMusic Festival.)	Zagreb	Croatia	Lake Jarun	—N/a
29 June 2016 (Note: The 29 June 2016 concert in Gdynia, Poland at Babie Doły Military Airport is a part of Open'er Festival.)	Gdynia	Poland	Babie Doły Military Airport	—N/a
2 July 2016 (Note: The 2 July 2016 concert in London, England at Hyde Park is a part of British Summer Time (concerts).)	London	England	Hyde Park	—N/a
3 July 2016 (Note: The 3 July 2016 in Werchter, Belgium at Werchter Festival Grounds is a part of Rock Werchter.)	Werchter	Belgium	Werchter Festival Grounds	—N/a

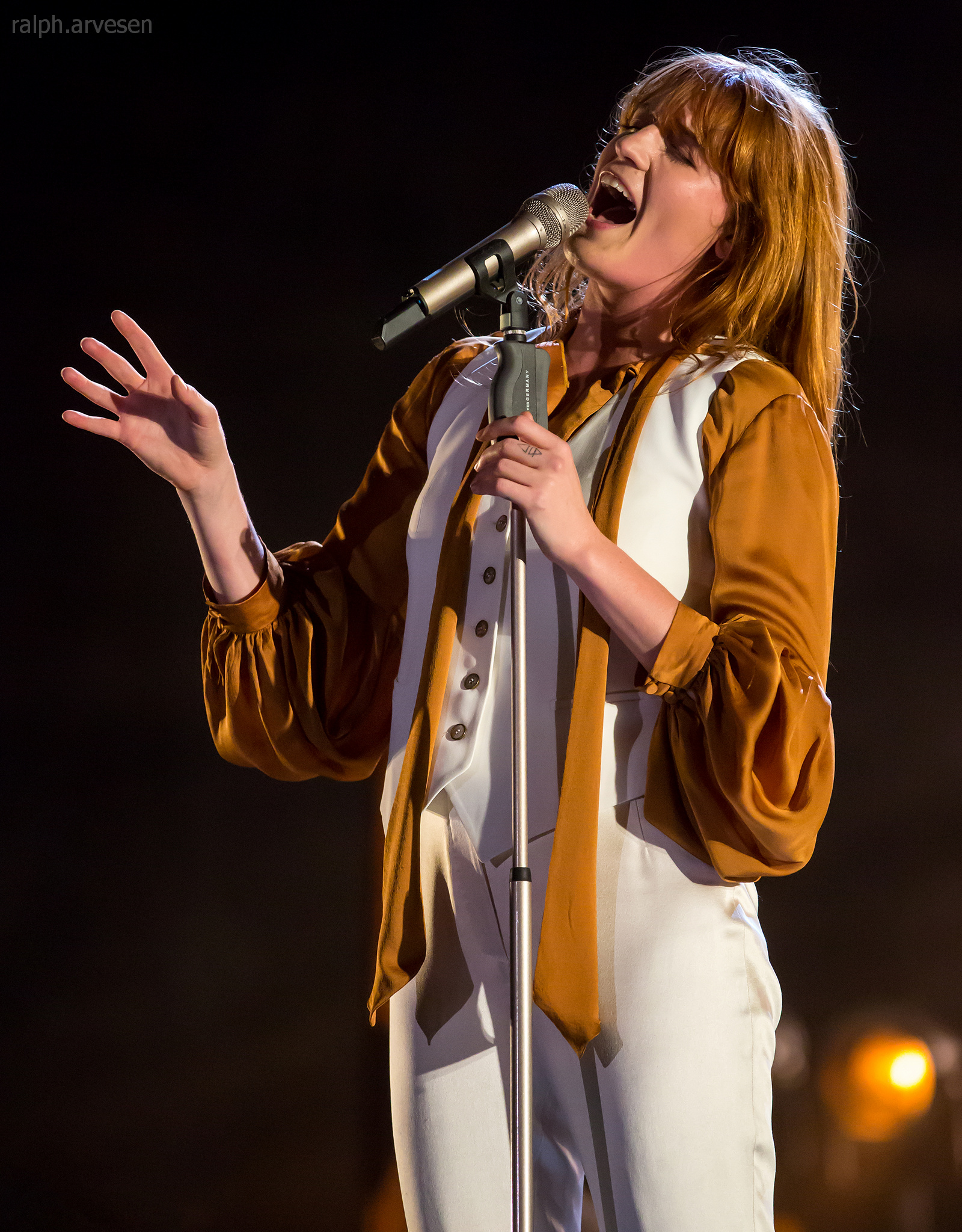
Florence and the Machine's Florence Welch performing at Austin City Limits Music Festival during the tour on 11 October 2015

=== Box office score data ===
Venue	City	Attendance	Revenue
SSE Hydro	Glasgow	10,329 / 10,806	$557,677
Hollywood Bowl	Los Angeles	29,030 / 35,023	$1,867,725
Santa Barbara Bowl	Santa Barbara	4,835 / 4,835	$414,598
Hearst Greek Theatre	Berkeley	15,966 / 15,966	$966,222
Perth Arena	Perth	10,651 / 11,138	$657,295
Sportpaleis	Antwerp	19,876 / 19,972	$809,820
Barclaycard Arena	Hamburg	9,152 / 11,687	$397,041
Wells Fargo Center	Philadelphia, Pennsylvania	9,460 / 14,000	$835,655
KM de Vantagens Hall	Rio de Janeiro	6,156 / 8,439	$335,797
Amway Center	Orlando	8,451 / 10,308	$507,164
American Airlines Center	Dallas	9,057 / 12,989	$547,890
Providence Medical Center Amphitheater	Bonner Springs	8,974 / 15,911	$344,620
Bell Centre	Montreal	9,380 / 10,781	$579,477
Total		153,857 / 179,855 (85.5%)	$8,820,981
