= High as Hope Tour =

2018–19 concert tour by Florence and the Machine

- Tour by Florence + the Machine
- Promotional poster for the tour
- Associated album: High as Hope
- Start date: 5 August 2018
- End date: 22 September 2019
- Legs: 6
- No. of shows: 47 in North America; 37 in Europe; 9 in Oceania; 93 in total
- Supporting acts: Wet; St. Vincent; Lizzo; Kamasi Washington; Billie Eilish; Beth Ditto; Grizzly Bear; Perfume Genius; Marlon Williams; Jack River; Yellow Days; Young Fathers; Christine and the Queens; Blood Orange; Grace VanderWaal; The National; Catfish and the Bottlemen

Florence + the Machine concert chronology
- How Big, How Blue, How Beautiful Tour (2015–16); High as Hope Tour (2018–19); Dance Fever Tour (2022–23)

The High as Hope Tour was the fourth concert tour by English indie band Florence and the Machine, in support of their fourth studio album, High as Hope (2018). The tour began on 5 August 2018 in Montreal, Canada and concluded on 22 September 2019 in Athens, Greece.

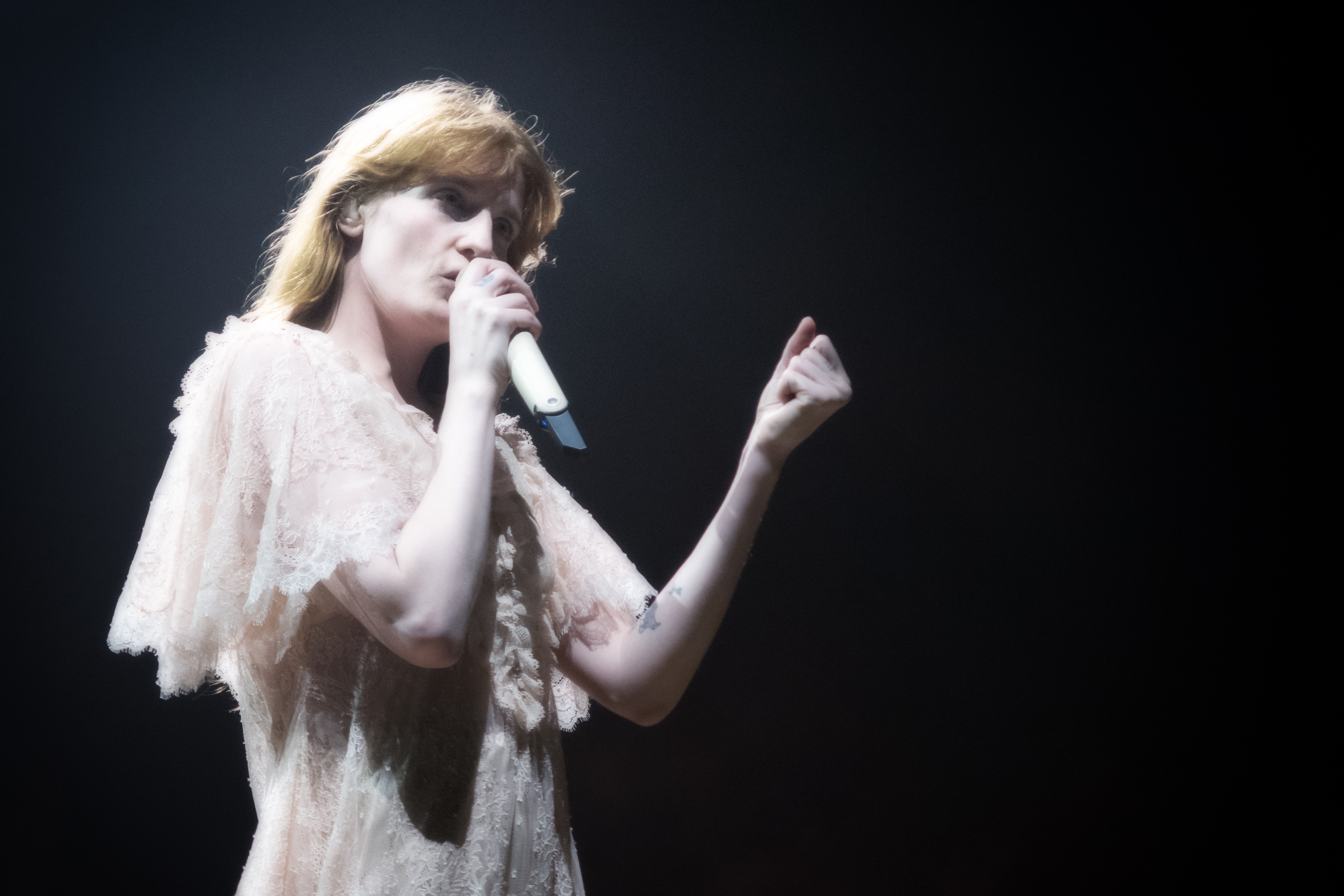
Lead singer Florence Welch performing on the tour stop in Seattle, Washington on September 10, 2018

== Set list ==
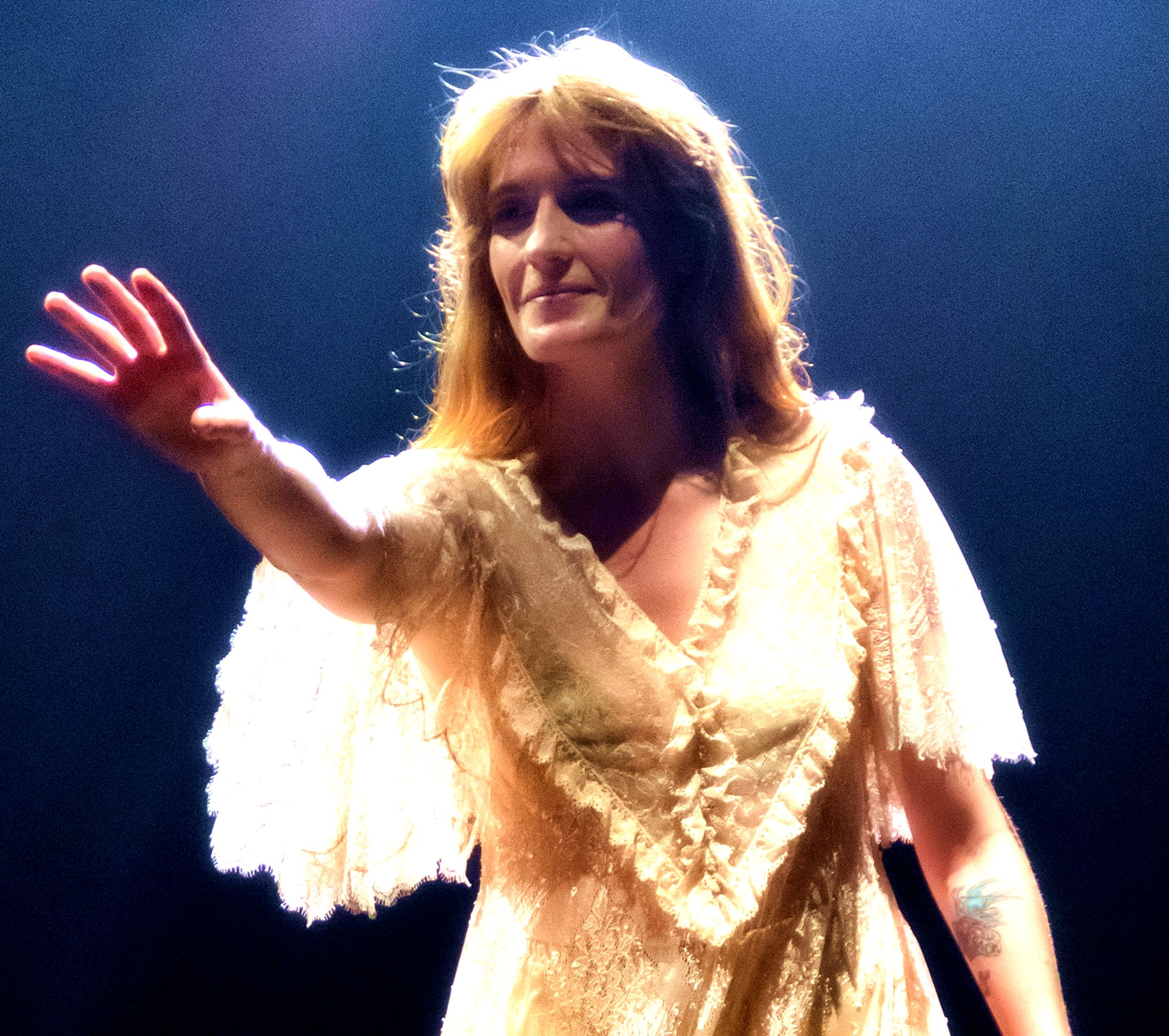
Florence Welch performing at the KeyArena in Seattle, Washington

This set list is representative of the 22 November 2018 show in London. It does not represent all dates of the tour.

1. "June"
2. "Hunger"
3. "Between Two Lungs"
4. "Only If for a Night"
5. "Queen of Peace"
6. "South London Forever"
7. "Patricia"
8. "Dog Days Are Over"
9. "Ship to Wreck"
10. "The End of Love"
11. "Cosmic Love"
12. "Delilah"
13. "What Kind of Man"
14. "Grace"
  Encore
15. "Big God"
16. "Shake It Out"

== Tour dates ==
List of 2018 concerts, showing date, city, country, venue and opening act
Date	City	Country	Venue	Opening act
5 August 2018 (Note: The August 5, 2018 concert at Parc Jean-Drapeau in Montreal is part of Osheaga Festival.)	Montreal	Canada	Parc Jean-Drapeau	—N/a
9 August 2018	Stateline	United States	Lake Tahoe Outdoor Arena	Wet
11 August 2018 (Note: The August 11, 2018 concert at Golden Gate Park in San Francisco is part of Outside Lands Festival.)	San Francisco	United States	Golden Gate Park	—N/a
8 September 2018 (Note: The September 8, 2018 concert at Stanley Park in Vancouver is part of Skookum Festival.)	Vancouver	Canada	Stanley Park	—N/a
10 September 2018	Seattle	United States	KeyArena	St. Vincent; Lizzo
11 September 2018	Portland	United States	Moda Center	St. Vincent; Lizzo
14 September 2018	West Valley City	United States	Maverik Center	St. Vincent; Lizzo
15 September 2018 (Note: The September 15, 2018 concert at Overland Golf Course in Denver is part of Grandoozy Festival.)	Denver	United States	Overland Golf Course	—N/a
22 September 2018 (Note: The September 22, 2018 concert at Downtown Las Vegas in Las Vegas is part of Life Is Beautiful Festival.)	Las Vegas	United States	Downtown Las Vegas	—N/a
23 September 2018	San Diego	United States	Viejas Arena	Kamasi Washington
25 September 2018	Los Angeles	United States	Hollywood Bowl	Kamasi Washington
26 September 2018	Los Angeles	United States	Hollywood Bowl	Kamasi Washington
29 September 2018	Irving	United States	Toyota Music Factory	Kamasi Washington
30 September 2018	The Woodlands	United States	Cynthia Woods Mitchell Pavilion	Kamasi Washington
2 October 2018	Nashville	United States	Bridgestone Arena	Billie Eilish
3 October 2018	Charlotte	United States	Spectrum Center	Billie Eilish
5 October 2018	Washington, D.C.	United States	The Anthem	Beth Ditto
6 October 2018	Washington, D.C.	United States	The Anthem	Beth Ditto
9 October 2018	Brooklyn	United States	Barclays Center	Grizzly Bear
10 October 2018	Brooklyn	United States	Barclays Center	Grizzly Bear
12 October 2018	Boston	United States	TD Garden	Grizzly Bear
13 October 2018	Uncasville	United States	Mohegan Sun Arena	Grizzly Bear
14 October 2018	Philadelphia	United States	Wells Fargo Center	Grizzly Bear
16 October 2018	Toronto	Canada	Scotiabank Arena	Grizzly Bear
19 October 2018	Chicago	United States	United Center	Perfume Genius
20 October 2018	Minneapolis	United States	Target Center	Perfume Genius
15 November 2018	Leeds	England	First Direct Arena	—N/a
16 November 2018	Birmingham	England	Genting Arena	—N/a
17 November 2018	Glasgow	Scotland	The SSE Hydro	—N/a
19 November 2018	Dublin	Ireland	3Arena	—N/a
21 November 2018	London	England	The O_{2} Arena	—N/a
22 November 2018	London	England	The O_{2} Arena	—N/a
23 November 2018	Manchester	England	Manchester Arena	—N/a
25 November 2018	Brighton	England	Brighton Centre	—N/a
26 November 2018	Cardiff	Wales	Motorpoint Arena Cardiff	—N/a

List of 2019 concerts, showing date, city, country, venue and opening act
Date	City	Country	Venue	Opening act
12 January 2019	Perth	Australia	RAC Arena	Marlon Williams
16 January 2019	Adelaide	Australia	Botanic Park	Billie Eilish; Marlon Williams
18 January 2019	Melbourne	Australia	Sidney Myer Music Bowl	Marlon Williams
19 January 2019 (Note: The January 19, 2019 concert at Mt Duneed Estate in Geelong is part of A Day on the Green.)	Geelong	Australia	Mt Duneed Estate	Billie Eilish; Marlon Williams
22 January 2019	Brisbane	Australia	Riverstage	Marlon Williams
23 January 2019	Brisbane	Australia	Riverstage	Marlon Williams
26 January 2019	Sydney	Australia	The Domain	Jack River; Marlon Williams
28 January 2019 (Note: The January 28, 2019 concert in Auckland is part of St Jerome's Laneway Festival.)	Auckland	New Zealand	Albert Park	—N/a
30 January 2019	Auckland	New Zealand	Spark Arena	Yellow Days
2 March 2019	Munich	Germany	Olympiahalle	Young Fathers
4 March 2019	Zürich	Switzerland	Hallenstadion	Young Fathers
5 March 2019	Cologne	Germany	Lanxess Arena	Young Fathers
7 March 2019	Antwerp	Belgium	Sportpaleis	Young Fathers
9 March 2019	Hamburg	Germany	Barclaycard Arena	Young Fathers
11 March 2019	Stockholm	Sweden	Ericsson Globe	Young Fathers
12 March 2019	Oslo	Norway	Oslo Spektrum	Young Fathers
14 March 2019	Berlin	Germany	Mercedes-Benz Arena	Young Fathers
15 March 2019	Łódź	Poland	Atlas Arena	Young Fathers
17 March 2019	Bologna	Italy	Unipol Arena	Young Fathers
18 March 2019	Turin	Italy	Pala Alpitour	Young Fathers
20 March 2019	Barcelona	Spain	Palau Sant Jordi	Young Fathers
21 March 2019	Madrid	Spain	WiZink Center	Young Fathers
24 March 2019	Paris	France	AccorHotels Arena	Young Fathers
25 March 2019	Rotterdam	Netherlands	Rotterdam Ahoy	Young Fathers
10 May 2019	Mayer	United States	FORM Arcosanti	—N/a
12 May 2019	Santa Barbara	United States	Santa Barbara Bowl	Perfume Genius
13 May 2019	Santa Barbara	United States	Santa Barbara Bowl	Perfume Genius
15 May 2019	Concord	United States	Concord Pavilion	Christine and the Queens
17 May 2019	Las Vegas	United States	T-Mobile Arena	Christine and the Queens
20 May 2019	Morrison	United States	Red Rocks Amphitheatre	Christine and the Queens
21 May 2019	Morrison	United States	Red Rocks Amphitheatre	Christine and the Queens
23 May 2019	Chicago	United States	Huntington Bank Pavilion	Blood Orange
24 May 2019	Clarkston	United States	DTE Energy Music Theatre	Blood Orange
26 May 2019	Toronto	Canada	Budweiser Stage	Blood Orange
28 May 2019	Montreal	Canada	Bell Centre	Blood Orange
30 May 2019	Mansfield	United States	Xfinity Center	Blood Orange
1 June 2019 (Note: The June 1, 2019 concert at Randalls Island in New York City is part of Governors Ball Music Festival.)	New York City	United States	Randalls Island	—N/a
3 June 2019	Columbia	United States	Merriweather Post Pavilion	Blood Orange
5 June 2019	Raleigh	United States	Coastal Credit Union Music Park	Grace VanderWaal
6 June 2019	Alpharetta	United States	Ameris Bank Amphitheatre	Grace VanderWaal
8 June 2019	Orlando	United States	Amway Center	Grace VanderWaal
9 June 2019	Miami	United States	American Airlines Arena	Grace VanderWaal
15 June 2019	Mexico City	Mexico	Palacio de los Deportes	Beth Ditto
16 June 2019	Guadalajara	Mexico	Auditorio Telmex	Beth Ditto
18 June 2019	Monterrey	Mexico	Auditorio Citibanamex	Beth Ditto
29 June 2019 (Note: The concert on June 29, 2019, at Werchter Festivalpark in Werchter was part of Rock Werchter.)	Werchter	Belgium	Werchter Festivalpark	—N/a
30 June 2019 (Note: The concert on June 30, 2019, at Sittertobel in St. Gallen was part of OpenAir St. Gallen.)	St. Gallen	Switzerland	Sittertobel	—N/a
13 July 2019 (Note: The concert on July 13, 2019, at Hyde Park in London was part of British Summer Time Hyde Park.)	London	England	Hyde Park	The National
17 July 2019 (Note: The concert on July 17, 2019, at Dolní oblast Vítkovice in Ostrava was part of Colours of Ostrava.)	Ostrava	Czech Republic	Dolní oblast Vítkovice	—N/a
19 July 2019 (Note: The concert on July 19, 2019, at Bonțida Bánffy Castle in Cluj-Napoca was part of Electric Castle.)	Cluj-Napoca	Romania	Bonțida Bánffy Castle	—N/a
7 August 2019 (Note: The concerts on August 7 & 8, 2019, at Princes Street Gardens in Edinburgh were part of Edinburgh Summer Sessions.)	Edinburgh	Scotland	Princes Street Gardens	—N/a
8 August 2019	Edinburgh	Scotland	Princes Street Gardens	—N/a
12 August 2019 (Note: The concert on August 12, 2019, at Óbudai-sziget in Budapest was part of Sziget Festival.)	Budapest	Hungary	Óbudai-sziget	Catfish and the Bottlemen
30 August 2019 (Note: The concert on August 30, 2019, at Area Expo in Milan was part of Milano Rocks.)	Milan	Italy	Area Expo	—N/a
1 September 2019 (Note: The concert on September 1, 2019, at Area Expo in Stradbally Hall was part of Electric Picnic.)	Stradbally	Ireland	Stradbally Hall	—N/a
19 September 2019	Athens	Greece	Herodion Theatre	—N/a
21 September 2019	Athens	Greece	Galatsi Olympic Hall	—N/a
22 September 2019	Athens	Greece	Herodion Theatre	—N/a

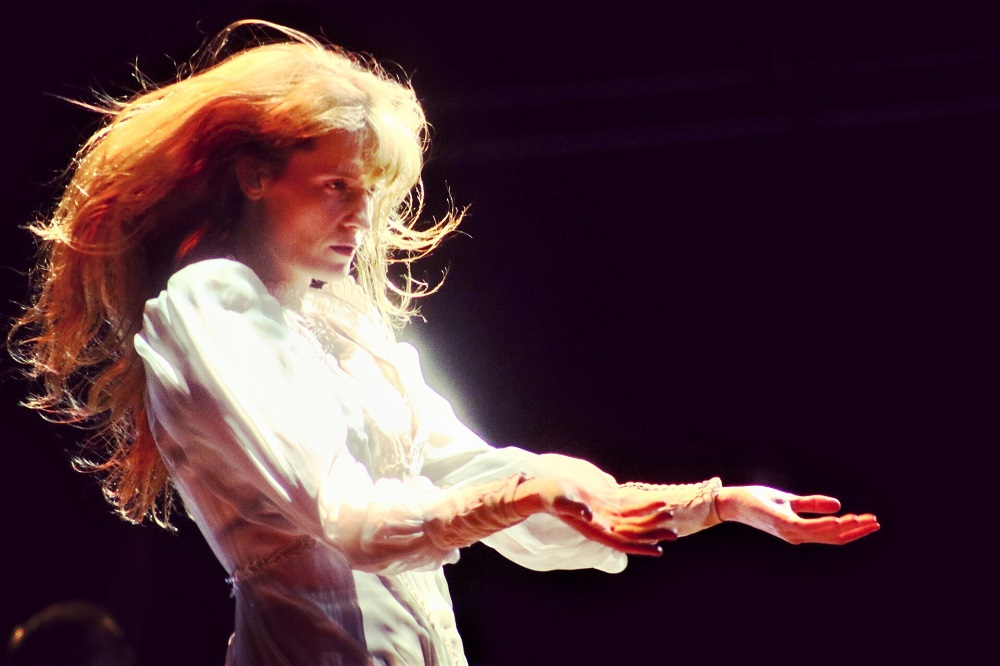
The tour stop at Grandoozy Festival in Denver, Colorado in September 2018

=== Cancelled shows ===
10 August 2019	Newquay	Boardmasters Festival	Festival cancelled.
