= Ship to Wreck =

2015 single by Florence and the Machine

Single by Florence and the Machine

from the album How Big, How Blue, How Beautiful
- Written: 2014
- Released: 9 April 2015
- Recorded: 2014
- Studio: The Pool (London)
- Genre: Folk-pop; folk rock; soft rock
- Length: 3:54
- Label: Island
- Songwriters: Florence Welch; Tom Hull
- Producers: Markus Dravs; Kid Harpoon

Florence and the Machine singles chronology
"What Kind of Man" (2015)	"Ship to Wreck" (2015)	"Queen of Peace" (2015)

Music video
- "Ship to Wreck" on YouTube

"Ship to Wreck" is a song by the English indie rock band Florence and the Machine from their third studio album, How Big, How Blue, How Beautiful (2015). The track was written by the frontwoman Florence Welch and Kid Harpoon, who produced it with Markus Dravs. Inspired by Welch's behaviour during a house party, "Ship to Wreck" explores self-destruction, self-doubt, and debauchery. A folk-pop, folk rock, and soft rock song, it has a guitar-led production that incorporates the bass, Hammond organ, and glockenspiel.

"Ship to Wreck" was released on 9 April 2015 as How Big, How Blue, How Beautiful's second single. Critics gave it positive reviews, praising Welch's vocals, the lyrics, and the sound. The song charted in the top 40 in Ireland, New Zealand, Scotland, Slovenia, and the United Kingdom. The Vincent Haycock–directed music video was released on 13 April 2015. Shot in Welch's home, it depicts arguments between partners and the destruction of a dinner party. The song and video were nominated for the Grammy Award for Best Pop Duo/Group Performance and the MTV Video Music Award for Best Rock Video, respectively.

Florence and the Machine performed "Ship to Wreck" on television shows, including Saturday Night Live and The Ellen DeGeneres Show, and at music festivals, including Coachella, Lollapalooza, and Glastonbury. They included the song on the setlists for the How Big Tour (2015), the How Blue Tour (2016), the How Beautiful Tour (2016), the High as Hope Tour (2018–2019), and the Dance Fever Tour (2022–2023).

== Background and release ==
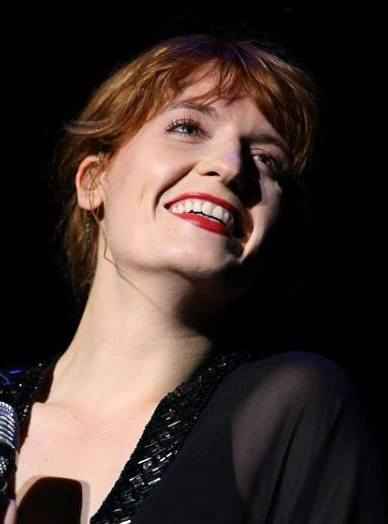
Florence and the Machine's frontwoman, Florence Welch (pictured in 2013), wrote "Ship to Wreck" after singing "Get Lucky" at a pub.

In 2011, the English indie rock band Florence and the Machine released their second studio album, Ceremonials. From October 2011 to December 2012, they embarked on the Ceremonials Tour in support of the album. In August 2012, the band's frontwoman, Florence Welch, told Style.com that she would take a year-long break from music. Later, she said that she had "kind of a breakdown" during this time and that the lack of structure forced her to "face [her] own chaos". The period allowed her to reassess her musical approach to reflect her own life experiences, with encouragement from the producer Markus Dravs. Welch wrote and recorded Florence and the Machine's third studio album, How Big, How Blue, How Beautiful (2015), in 2014. The songs explore more realistic themes than the band's previous albums, departing from their heavy use of fantasy and metaphor, as well as Ceremonials's focus on death and water; the album is "about trying to learn how to live, and how to love in the world rather than trying to escape from it", according to Welch.

"Ship to Wreck" is inspired by Welch's behaviour during a party at her house after the conclusion of the Ceremonials Tour. During the party, she went to a pub, sang "Get Lucky" by Daft Punk with a house band, and crowd-surfed "on to no one". Her cover appeared on MTV News, leading her manager to ask her about it. Afterwards, Welch reflected on why she, at times, "wanted to completely destroy everything" and how partying did not take her "anywhere good" when she was allowed to do it as much as she wanted. She wrote "Ship to Wreck" a few weeks later; she found the process simple and quick. Welch also drew inspiration from the clashes between the chaotic and quiet parts of her personality. According to Welch, Dravs forbade her from writing any songs about water, but the lyrics of "Ship to Wreck" were "not too explicit" compared to her past works. She stated that the song explores self-destruction and the paradox of creating something only to destroy it, during which one ultimately damages what they love most. Later, while performing at Coachella, she said it was about "some time off [she] had in London where [she] had some drunken parties and trashed [her] house and said a drunken 'I love you' too soon".

In February 2015, Florence and the Machine announced How Big, How Blue, How Beautiful and revealed its tracklist, with "Ship to Wreck" as the first track. The band premiered the song on 8 April on BBC Radio 1 during Huw Stephens's show. Island Records released it for digital download the following day; it was the album's second single after "What Kind of Man". On 24 April and 19 May, the song was released to the Italian radio and the US alternative radio, respectively. Polydor Records released a live version as part of the album Dance Fever (Live at Madison Square Garden) in October 2022.

== Composition ==
"Ship to Wreck"
A sample of the pre-chorus and chorus, showing Welch's vocal delivery and the guitar-led production

Welch wrote "Ship to Wreck" with Kid Harpoon, who produced it alongside Dravs. It is a folk-pop, folk rock, and soft rock song, with elements of pop-rock crossover. ABC News believed that its sound tended more towards rock than contemporary pop. The track's has a quick pulse, and Rolling Stone described its sound as "upbeat [and] bouncy", in contrast to the lyrics. The song has a guitar-led production, with acoustic strumming over a steady backbeat. It also contains a dynamic bass groove, Hammond organ, and glockenspiel. "Ship to Wreck" opens intensely; Spin considered the opening's explosiveness a departure from the slower build-ups of the band's most commercially successful songs, such as "Dog Days Are Over" (2008) and "Shake It Out" (2011), instead likening it to their first single, "Kiss with a Fist" (2008). The Guardian noted influences of American music in the "retro" guitar reverb effect during the opening. Welch's vocal delivery in the pre-chorus and chorus has been described as a wail by critics. At the line "Did I build a ship to wreck?", the song resounds at a fast tempo and possesses, according to Consequence, a "sense of wild abandon". Journalists have compared "Ship to Wreck" to the music of the rock bands Fleetwood Mac and the Cure, as well as the American singer-songwriter Stevie Nicks. Nylon found its sound reminiscent of the band's first studio album, Lungs (2009), while Rolling Stone thought it recalled guitar pop songs from the 1980s.

The lyrics of "Ship to Wreck" explore self-destruction, self-doubt, and debauchery. Welch discusses a poor relationship warped by substance abuse and delusions, using nautical metaphors to represent insomniac confusion. She compares her relationship to a damaged ship that has drifted ashore. In the first lines, the lyrics depict a vulnerable body; Welch sings, "Don't touch the sleeping pills, they mess with my head". She then describes great white sharks and a killer whale that "has me by its teeth"; according to The Guardian, the predatory imagery symbolises her anxieties. Welch attempts to reconstruct what occurred, asking, "Oh, my love, remind me, what was it I did?/ Did I drink too much? Am I losing touch?/ Did I build a ship to wreck?" in the pre-chorus. The bridge emphasises her self-destruction: "We are lost, and into the breach, we got tossed/ And the water is coming in fast".

The lyrics of "Ship to Wreck" are referenced in later songs on How Big, How Blue, How Beautiful. The sleeping pills are mentioned again near the end of "Delilah", and the question "did I build a ship to wreck?" is reaffirmed in the lyric "Maybe I've always been more comfortable in chaos" in "St. Jude", one of the album's final tracks. The Independent likened the darkness of the line "I can't help but pull the earth around me to make my bed" to the imagery of "trying to cross a canyon with a broken limb" in "What Kind of Man".

== Reception ==
"Ship to Wreck" received positive reviews from critics. Upon How Big, How Blue, How Beautiful's release, Billboard and Spin labelled the song one of 2015's "more memorable singles" and a peak in Florence and the Machine's career, respectively. Likewise, ABC News's Allan Raible believed "Ship to Wreck" deserved similar success to "Shake It Out" and picked it as one of his favourite tracks from the album. William Tomer, writing for The 405, argued that "Ship to Wreck", alongside "What Kind of Man", would "floor most people". Michelle Geslani of Consequence and Kyle Anderson of Entertainment Weekly praised Welch's "powerhouse" vocals, while Michael Madden asserted that its pre-chorus and chorus had replay potential "today, five years from now, whenever". On the other hand, Sputnikmusic panned the song as "flat" and "downright bland", and Drowned in Sound criticised its "over-zealous" chorus, despite enjoying the use of strings.

Critics also commented on the lyrics and their interplay with the sound. Although he found "Ship to Wreck" to be the "most conventional" song ever written by Welch, The Line of Best Fit writer Ed Nash thought that the juxtaposition between the lyrics and sound—dubbed a "Trojan Horse trick"—was "remarkably subversive". Similarly, DIY deemed the track one of the band's best fusions of candid lyricism and uplifting pop music. Referencing Davos's ban on songs about water, Leonie Cooper of NME joked that "[Welch's] disobedience is pop's gain" and argued that the song had a "lusty life force". Under the Radar's Hays Davis considered it a "rousing, galloping" examination of self-destruction with "the best singalong to a worst-case scenario in recent memory".

Journalists have ranked "Ship to Wreck" among the best songs of 2015. Jason Lipshutz of Billboard included it on a "Top 10 Songs of 2015 (So Far)" list in June 2015; he considered the song indicative of Welch's continued growth as a pop songwriter and praised her voice, the arrangement, and the chorus. The track has appeared in rankings of the best songs of 2015 by Rolling Stone (26th) and Spin (40th); the writers praised Welch's voice, and Spin asserted that the song epitomised her "majestic, barely controlled fury". Additionally, The Music picked "Ship to Wreck" as one of 2015's top ten singles, and NPR selected it as one of their favourite pop songs of the year. The former said it "easily pulls at the heartstrings, a vulnerable, chaotic outpouring". At the 58th Annual Grammy Awards, "Ship to Wreck" was nominated for Best Pop Duo/Group Performance.

"Ship to Wreck" has also been included in lists of Florence and the Machine's best songs. It placed first and fourth in The Guardian and Consequence's 2022 rankings, respectively, with the former's Michael Cragg stating, "Ruin never sounded so wonderful." In 2023, the ticket sales and distribution company Ticketmaster ranked the song second, labelling it the band's "most infectious" track and deeming it "a triumphant, almost joyful expression" of self-destruction.

== Commercial performance ==
In the United Kingdom, "Ship to Wreck" debuted at number 94 on the Official Singles Chart on the chart issued for 25 April 2015. It later peaked at number 27 and spent 14 weeks on the chart. As of July 2018, "Ship to Wreck" had sold 279,000 units in the United Kingdom, including 17 million streams, making it Florence and the Machine's eighth-most commercially successful single in the country. In January 2026, it was certified platinum by the British Phonographic Industry. In the United States, it charted at 14 on Billboard's Bubbling Under Hot 100 and topped the Adult Alternative Airplay; it received a gold certification from the Recording Industry Association of America in August 2023. In Australia, the song peaked at number 48 on the ARIA Singles Charts and was certified platinum. It also reached number 40 on the Triple J's Hottest 100 of 2015, which lists the most popular songs of the year, as chosen by the listeners of the Australian radio station Triple J. "Ship to Wreck" has also charted in Scotland (15), Slovenia (36), New Zealand (37), Ireland (38), Austria (66), Germany (81), and France (125). It was certified gold and platinum in Brazil and New Zealand respectively.

== Music video ==
The music video for "Ship to Wreck" was directed by Vincent Haycock and choreographed by Ryan Heffington. It was shot in Welch's home. Production involved a 50-person crew, who dismantled the lights and assembled rigging. The video premiered at a festival in Indio, California, and was released on 13 April 2015. It depicts Welch arguing with her partner (Morgan Watkins); while singing, "Did I build this ship to wreck?", she runs through various rooms as he follows her. She also struggles with her alter ego (Deena Thompson), who impairs her relationships, and wrecks the house during a dinner party in a manner that she compared to the horror film The Exorcist (1973). Billboard described the video's tone as "dark"; Rolling Stone noted the themes of duality and lauded the choreography as "stunning". At the 2015 MTV Video Music Awards, it was nominated for Best Rock Video. The music video, alongside others produced for How Big, How Blue, How Beautiful, was included in Florence and the Machine's 2016 short film, The Odyssey.

== Live performances ==
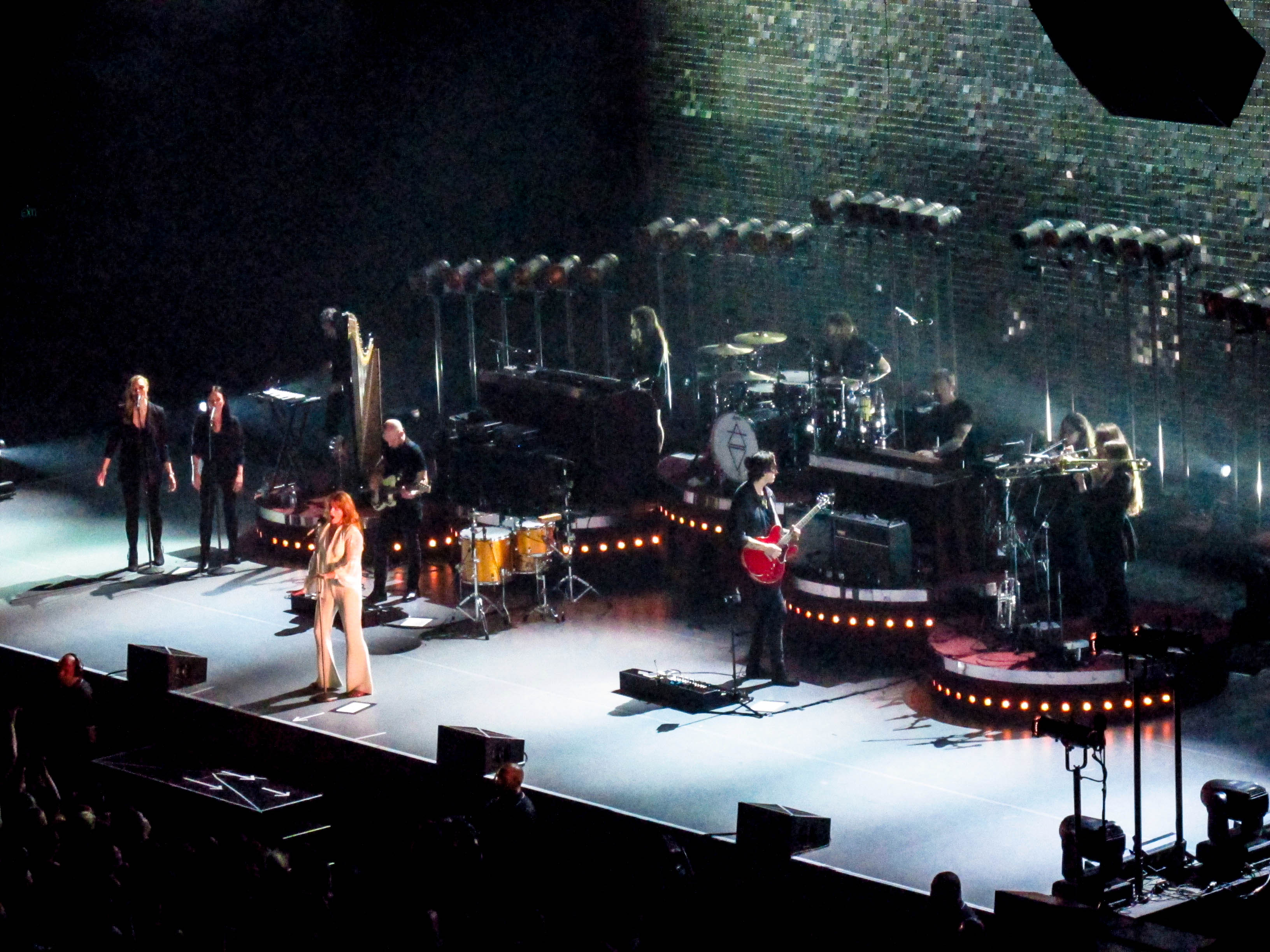
Florence and the Machine performing in Auckland on the How Big Tour

Florence and the Machine performed "Ship to Wreck" for the first time at the SF Masonic Auditorium in April 2015; the rendition paired the track with "Drumming Song" from Lungs. That month, they played "Ship to Wreck" at both of their performances at the music festival Coachella. Commenting on the first weekend, the Los Angeles Times lauded Welch's vocals and said that it was "impossible to do anything but watch her" during the song's runs. After breaking her foot, Welch sang on a chair in a stripped back performance for the second weekend. Throughout 2015, the band played the song on television shows (Note: These include Later... with Jools Holland, The Graham Norton Show, and The Tonight Show Starring Jimmy Fallon.) and at festivals. (Note: These include BBC Radio 1's Big Weekend, the Governors Ball, Bonnaroo, and Rock Werchter.) Welch was seated for several appearances due to her broken foot. The band performed the track on Saturday Night Live in May; journalists praised the rendition as "soaring", "exceptional", and "electrifying", with Rolling Stone's Daniel Kreps asserting that it possessed "pinpoint precision". "Ship to Wreck" was the second song on the setlist of the band's 2015 headlining sets at the Glastonbury Festival and Lollapalooza. In July, they played it at several Australian shows, including the festival Splendour in the Grass. The Guardian remarked that the festival audience showed enthusiasm for the song and was familiar with it. Florence and the Machine performed "Ship to Wreck" on The Ellen DeGeneres Show in a shallow pool of water in October. Welch danced, splashed, and kneeled in the water; the majority of the band was placed on platforms. Commentators described the performance as "unique", "really cool", and "a religious experience".

Florence and the Machine included "Ship to Wreck" on the setlist of their 2015 and 2016 tours—the How Big Tour, the How Blue Tour, and the How Beautiful Tour; it was the second song played. During the performance, Welch ran and danced across the stage. The Sun Sentinel said that the song was "arena-shaking", while The Sydney Morning Herald and The Dallas Morning News wrote that Welch's vocals were "flawless" and "powerful and studio-perfect", respectively. The Herald was more critical, remarking that the performance favoured "bombastic efficiency" over audience satisfaction. The band also included "Ship to Wreck" on the setlists for the High as Hope Tour (2018–2019) and the Dance Fever Tour (2022–2023).

== Credits and personnel ==
Credits adapted from the liner notes of How Big, How Blue, How Beautiful.

=== Recording ===
- Engineered at The Pool (London)
- Mixed at The Mixsuite (UK)
- Mastered at Sterling Sound (New York City)

=== Personnel ===
Florence and the Machine

- Florence Welch – vocals, backing vocals
- Chris Hayden – drums, percussion
- Rob Ackroyd – electric guitar

Additional personnel

- Markus Dravs – production, glockenspiel
- Kid Harpoon – production, drums, percussion, bass, electric guitar, CP70 synth
- Robin Baynton – engineering
- Jonathan Sagis – engineering assistance
- Iain Berryman – engineering assistance
- Leo Abrahams – acoustic guitar
- James Hallawell – Hammond organ
- Janelle Martin – backing vocals
- Nim Miller – backing vocals
- Baby N'Sola – backing vocals
- Mark "Spike" Stent – mixing
- Geoff Swan – mixing assistance
- Ted Jensen – mastering

== Charts ==
=== Weekly charts ===
Weekly chart performance for "Ship to Wreck"
Chart (2015)	Peak position
Australia (ARIA)	48
Austria (Ö3 Austria Top 40)	66
Belgium (Ultratop 50 Flanders)	12
Belgium (Ultratop 50 Wallonia)	48
Canada Rock (Billboard)	11
France (SNEP)	125
Germany (GfK)	81
Ireland (IRMA)	38
New Zealand (Recorded Music NZ)	37
Poland (Polish Airplay New)	1
Scottish Singles Sales (Official Charts)	15
Slovenia (SloTop50)	36
Switzerland Airplay (Schweizer Hitparade)	64
UK Singles (Official Charts)	27
UK Singles Downloads (Official Charts)	18
UK Audio Streaming (Official Charts)	96
US Adult Alternative Airplay (Billboard)	1
US Alternative Airplay (Billboard)	8
US Bubbling Under Hot 100 (Billboard)	14
US Hot Rock & Alternative Songs (Billboard)	11
US Rock & Alternative Airplay (Billboard)	9

=== Year-end charts ===
Year-end chart performance for "Ship to Wreck"
Chart (2015)	Position
Belgium (Ultratop Flanders)	95
US Hot Rock & Alternative Songs (Billboard)	35
US Rock Airplay (Billboard)	26

== Certifications ==
Certifications for "Ship to Wreck"
Region	Certification	Certified units/sales
Australia (ARIA)	Platinum	70,000^{‡}
Brazil (Pro-Música Brasil)	Gold	30,000^{‡}
New Zealand (RMNZ)	Platinum	30,000^{‡}
United Kingdom (BPI)	Platinum	600,000^{‡}
United States (RIAA)	Gold	500,000^{‡}
^{‡} Sales+streaming figures based on certification alone.

== Release history ==
Release dates and formats for "Ship to Wreck"
Region	Date	Format	Label	Ref.
Various	9 April 2015	Digital download	Island	
Italy	24 April 2025	Radio airplay	Island	
United States	19 May 2015	Alternative radio	Republic	
