= Ryan Heffington =

American dancer and choreographer

- Born: June 7, 1973 (age 53); Yuba City, California, U.S.
- Occupations: Dancer, choreographer
- Years active: 1980—present
- Website: http://www.sirheffington.com

Ryan Heffington (born June 7, 1973) is an American dancer and choreographer based in Los Angeles. He was nominated for two Grammy Awards for choreographing the music videos for Arcade Fire's "We Exist" (2013) and Sia's "Chandelier" (2014), winning a VMA Award for the latter.

== Early life ==
Heffington was born in Yuba City, California. He has danced since he was young, but has never received any formal training. He moved from Yuba City to Los Angeles at the age of 18.

== Career ==
In the mid-1990s, Heffington co-created the sexy Psycho Dance Sho' with Bubba Carr, and in the late 2000s he was the artistic director for the experimental modern dance company Hysterica. From 2006 to 2009, Heffington lead the dance troupe Fingered, which combined fast-paced Martha Graham-style choreography with genderbending costumes designed by Heffington. He has performed at bars and clubs, as well as MOCA, LACMA, the Dorothy Chandler Pavilion, Saturday Night Live, Walt Disney Concert Hall, the UCLA Hammer Museum and Coachella.

Heffington is best known for choreographing the music videos for Arcade Fire's "We Exist" (2013) and Sia's "Chandelier" (2014), both of which were nominated for Grammy Awards, and the latter of which won him a VMA Award. Other Sia videos that Heffington has choreographed include "Elastic Heart", "Big Girls Cry", "Cheap Thrills" and "The Greatest". Sia and Heffington's collaborations have "done more to raise the standards of dance in pop music than nearly any current artist integrating the forms." He has also worked with FKA Twigs and Britney Spears, and made several appearances on RuPaul's Drag Race.

Heffington created the choreography for the science fiction series The OA, which debuted on Netflix in December 2016.

More of his work can be seen in television, film and onstage around the world, including the first season finale of HBO's Euphoria, Prime Video's Transparent, Spike Jonze's commercials for Kenzo (winner of the highest honor, the Titanium Lion @ the 2017 Cannes Film Festival), Apple's “Welcome Homepod” featuring FKA Twigs, and Edgar Wright's critically acclaimed 2017 film Baby Driver.

Heffington was the owner of The Sweat Spot, a dance studio in Silver Lake, Los Angeles. The space offered classes for both professional dancers and beginners in a casual atmosphere. Heffington decided to open the studio after he had hosted a roving event called Sweaty Sundays. Although the studio closed in 2020, Heffington still hosts Sweatfest and Wet Wednesdays on Instagram to thousands of dancers live.

More recently, Heffington choreographed Lin-Manuel Miranda's 2021 film adaptation of the Jonathan Larson musical tick, tick... BOOM! and made his acting debut in Paul Thomas Anderson's Licorice Pizza.

== Filmography ==
=== Music Videos ===
| Year | Title | Artist | Notes |
|---|---|---|---|
| 2012 | "Fjögur píanó" | Sigur Rós | Choreographer |
| 2014 | "I Try to Talk to You" | Hercules and Love Affair | Choreographer |
| 2014 | "Chandelier" | Sia | Choreographer |
| 2014 | "We Exist" | Arcade Fire | Choreographer |
| 2014 | "Gold" | Chet Faker | Choreographer |
| 2014 | "Video Girl" | FKA Twigs | Choreographer |
| 2014 | "Gunshot" | Lykke Li | Choreographer |
| 2015 | "Elastic Heart" | Sia | Choreographer |
| 2015 | "Big Girls Cry" | Sia | Choreographer |
| 2015 | "What Kind of Man" | Florence and the Machine | Choreographer |
| 2015 | "Ship to Wreck" | Florence and the Machine | Choreographer |
| 2015 | "St Jude" | Florence and the Machine | Choreographer |
| 2015 | "Queen of Peace"/"Long & Lost" | Florence and the Machine | Choreographer |
| 2015 | "Anna" | Will Butler | Choreographer |
| 2015 | "King" | Years & Years | Choreographer |
| 2016 | "Worship" | Years & Years | Choreographer |
| 2016 | "Cheap Thrills" | Sia | Choreographer |
| 2016 | "The Greatest" | Sia | Choreographer |
| 2017 | "Rainbow" | Sia | Choreographer |
| 2017 | "Destroyer" | "TR/ST" | Choreographer |
| 2018 | "Thunderclouds" | LSD | Choreographer |
| 2018 | "Colors" | Beck | Choreographer |
| 2020 | "La vita nuova" | Christine and the Queens | Choreographer |
| 2022 | "King" and "Free" | Florence and the Machine | Choreographer |
| 2026 | "Aperture" | Harry Styles | Choreographer |
| 2026 | "Dance No More" | Harry Styles | Choreographer |

=== Commercials ===
| Year | Commercial | | Notes |
|---|---|---|---|
| 2014 | FKA Twigs #throughglass | Commercial for Google Glass | Choreographer |
| 2016 | Kenzo World | Commercial for Kenzo | Choreographer |
| 2018 | Welcome Home | Commercial for Apple HomePod | Choreographer |
| 2018 | Tiffany & Co. Spring 18 | Commercial directed by Francis Lawrence | Choreographer |
| 2021 | Chanel n. 5 | Commercial for Chanel | |

== Awards and nominations ==
| Year | Award | Category | Nominated work | Result | Ref. |
|---|---|---|---|---|---|
| 2014 | MTV Video Music Awards | Best Choreography | "Chandelier" (Sia) | Won | |
| 2015 | MTV Video Music Awards | Best Choreography | "Gold" (Chet Faker) | Nominated | |
| 2015 | UK Music Video Awards | Best Choreography in a Video | "Elastic Heart" (Sia) | Won | |
| 2017 | MTV Video Music Awards | Best Choreography | "The Greatest" (Sia) | Nominated | |
| 2017 | UK Music Video Awards | Best Choreography in a Video | "The Greatest" (Sia) | Nominated | |
| 2022 | Creative Arts Emmy Awards | Outstanding Choreography for Scripted Programming | Euphoria | Won | |
