= St. Jude (song) =

Song by Florence and the Machine

Song by Florence and the Machine

from the album How Big, How Blue, How Beautiful
- Written: 2014
- Released: 25 March 2015
- Recorded: 2014
- Studio: The Pool (London)
- Genre: Electropop
- Length: 3:45
- Label: Island Records
- Songwriters: Florence Welch; James Ford
- Producer: Markus Dravs

Music video
- "St. Jude" on YouTube

"St. Jude" is a song by the English indie rock band Florence and the Machine from their third studio album, How Big, How Blue, How Beautiful (2015). Written by the frontwoman Florence Welch alongside James Ford and produced by Markus Dravs, it is a minimalist electropop ballad with an organ-led production. Its lyrics discuss a breakup and allude to Jude the Apostle (the patron saint of lost causes) and the St. Jude storm. The song was released for digital download on 25 March 2015. In reviews of How Big, How Blue, How Beautiful, critics praised "St. Jude", highlighting its sound and poignancy, though some found it underwhelming. The music video was directed by Vincent Haycock and was released on 23 March. Inspired by Dante Alighieri's the Divine Comedy, it depicts Welch wandering through an old town in the rain before collapsing in a field at the end. Florence and the Machine have performed the song live several times, including at the music festivals the Governors Ball and Lollapalooza.

== Background and release ==
Florence and the Machine are an English indie rock band. Their frontwoman, Florence Welch, conceived their third studio album, How Big, How Blue, How Beautiful (2015), during a self-destructive period, writing and recording it in 2014. She initially envisioned it as a concept album about a young woman put on trial for murder in Hollywood, Los Angeles. However, the producer Markus Dravs, who Welch recruited to challenge her use of clichés and encourage her to take risks, rejected the idea. How Big, How Blue, How Beautiful was reworked to be a more personal and honest record than Florence and the Machine's previous albums. The songs eschew the band's prior focus on fantasy, metaphor, death and water, instead exploring more realistic themes; the album is "about trying to learn how to live, and how to love in the world rather than trying to escape from it", according to Welch.

While Welch was taking a break from music, the St. Jude storm hit Northwestern Europe. She subsequently wrote a song inspired by the storm and the environment it created. The writing process was quick and simple. Welch initially did not want to include songs that were written easily on the album, feeling that they were "unearned"; she preferred tracks with heavy reverb and layered vocals, such as "Which Witch". However, Dravs sought to explore music that made Welch "uncomfortable", deeming "big songs" her "safe space".

In February 2015, Florence and the Machine announced How Big, How Blue, How Beautiful and revealed its tracklist, with "St. Jude" as the tenth and penultimate track. Island Records released the song for digital download on 25 March 2015 in the United Kingdom. Prior to its release, the band played the song live at a performance at The Dome, London. In April and May 2015, they performed it during an encore at the SF Masonic Auditorium and a show at the Music Hall of Williamsburg. Commenting on a performance of "St. Jude" at the Governors Ball, New York Daily News said Welch's voice "glimmered with richness". In August, the band performed the song at Lollapalooza, and Welch dedicated it to the stormy weather at the festival.

== Music and lyrics ==
"St. Jude" is an electropop ballad, departing from the baroque pop sound of Florence and the Machine's previous songs. Commentators have described the song's sound as "serene", "mellow", "sparse", "restrained" and "subdued". In a 2015 Drowned in Sound review, Joe Goggins asserted that "St. Jude" was the band's most intimate, most delicate track to date. Journalists have compared the piece to a requiem and a hymn. The track has a minimalist organ-led production, emphasising Welch's voice and electronic rumbles. The song also incorporates a bass drum—whose sound The Line of Best Fit likened to a slower version of the heartbeat in "Cosmic Love"—synthesizers, a backing choir, horns and woodwinds, including an oboe. It is underscored by basic chords played on a keyboard.

The lyrics of "St. Jude" discuss a breakup. The song's title is used as a hook; Welch calls on Jude the Apostle (the "patron saint of the lost causes"), as well as the St. Jude storm. She sings a series of rhymes in quick succession: "And I’m learning, so I'm leaving/ And even though I'm grieving/ I'm trying to find the meaning/ Let loss reveal it." Consequence interpreted them as representative of the complications in her life. Welch accepts the occasionally doomed nature of love and how incorrect choices can lead to its collapse: "Maybe I've always been more comfortable in chaos".

== Reception ==
"St. Jude" received praise from critics. Upon How Big, How Blue, How Beautiful's release, Nathan Stevens of PopMatters dubbed it one the band's best songs, finding it to be a "promising and fascinating piece". Similarly, reviews in Clash and The Independent referred to as one of the album's "standout moment[s]" and its "most touching performance" respectively. ABC News thought that the song contained "a quiet, subtly beautiful ambiance", and Rolling Stone believed it had a "beguiling" quality. The Guardian's Kitty Empire argued that "St. Jude" indicated Florence and the Machine's continued growth as an artist, despite finding it less affecting than their angrier songs. Vulture was more ambivalent, believing that it did not develop "to much of anything". Sputnikmusic panned the song as "painfully trite" and criticised the lyrics, particularly the repetition of the title. Stevens was slightly critical of its placement on the album's tracklist, arguing that it should have been the closer.

In 2022, The Guardian ranked "St. Jude" as Florence and the Machine's fourth-best song, referring to it as their "most genuinely affecting song".

== Music video ==
The music video for "St. Jude" was directed by Vincent Haycock. It was released on 23 March 2015. Haycock stated that the video takes place in "the first layer of Hell" and explores relationships and Welch's journey through a version of the Italian narrative poem the Divine Comedy by Dante Alighieri. The video is a sequel to the music video for "What Kind of Man" and was shot in one continuous take. Welch begins the video topless in the woods before it cuts to her being held by her partner while wet. He leaves, and she wanders through an old town in the rain. In the process, she meets several people, and a man asks her why she is travelling alone; according to Billboard, his question is answered in the lyrics. At the end of the video, Welch collapses in a field with her arms raised, and a flock of starlings form a dark circle. Journalists described the video as "gorgeous", "remarkable" and "dreamy". Dee Lockett of Vulture stated that it was "one hell of a tearjerker" and commended the imagery and Welch's dancing. The music video was included in Florence and the Machine's 2016 short film, The Odyssey.

== Credits and personnel ==
Credits are adapted from the liner notes of How Big, How Blue, How Beautiful.

=== Recording ===
- Engineered and woodwind recorded at The Pool (London)
- Mixed at The Mixsuite (UK)
- Mastered at Sterling Sound (New York City)

=== Personnel ===
==== Florence and the Machine ====
- Florence Welch – vocals, backing vocals

==== Additional personnel ====
- Markus Dravs – production, programming, woodwind arrangements
- Pete Prokopiw – programming
- Sally Herbert – orchestration, woodwind arrangements
- James Ford – programming, woodwind arrangements
- Rebecca Wood – oboe, cor anglais
- Pete Harrison – bassoon
- Robin Baynton – engineering, woodwind recording
- Jonathan Sagis – engineering assistance
- Iain Berryman – engineering assistance
- Ted Jensen – mastering
- Craig Silvey – mixing
- Eduardo de la Paz – mixing assistance

== Charts ==
Weekly chart performance for "St. Jude"
Chart (2015)	Peak position
UK Singles Downloads (Official Charts)	89
US Hot Rock & Alternative Songs (Billboard)	36
