= How Big, How Blue, How Beautiful =

2015 studio album by Florence and the Machine

- Standard CD and LP cover (Note: The deluxe edition and digital download album cover only includes the shot of Florence Welch.)

Studio album by Florence and the Machine
- Released: 29 May 2015
- Recorded: February 2014 – 2015
- Studios: The Pool (London) (Note: Tracks 1–10 and 12; woodwind on track 10); Angel (London) (Note: Brass on tracks 2–4 and 9; strings on tracks 3–5; flute on tracks 3 and 4); Urchin (London) (Note: Track 4); Lightship 95 (London) (Note: Track 12); Sarm Studio 1 (London) (Note: Track 13); No. 1 Baltic Place (London); Bedrock Rehearsal (Los Angeles) (Note: Tracks 14 and 16); 123 (London) (Note: Track 15)
- Genres: Indie pop; art rock; soul
- Length: 48:46
- Label: Island
- Producers: Markus Dravs; Kid Harpoon; John Hill; Paul Epworth; James Ford; Charlie Hugall; Isabella Summers; Brett Shaw; Dan Wilson

Florence and the Machine chronology
MTV Unplugged (2012)	How Big, How Blue, How Beautiful (2015)	Songs from Final Fantasy XV (2016)

Singles from How Big, How Blue, How Beautiful
- 1. "What Kind of Man" Released: 12 February 2015; 2. "Ship to Wreck" Released: 9 April 2015; 3. "Queen of Peace" Released: 4 September 2015; 4. "Delilah" Released: 27 November 2015

How Big, How Blue, How Beautiful is the third studio album by the English indie rock band Florence and the Machine, released on 29 May 2015 by Island Records. After her year-long break from music, the lead vocalist, Florence Welch, returned to configure the album, recording material that dealt with personal conflicts and struggles. In comparison to the band's two previous studio albums, it is much more refined and stripped-down instrumentally, and incorporates a mixture of musical influences such as folk, blues and gospel.

How Big, How Blue, How Beautiful was met with positive reviews from music critics, who commended the album for its cohesion, production and Welch's vocal delivery. It appeared on several year-end critics' lists. The album entered the UK Albums Chart at number one with 68,788 copies sold in its first week, becoming the band's third consecutive number-one album. Four singles were released, "What Kind of Man", "Ship to Wreck", "Queen of Peace" and "Delilah". The album earned the band five Grammy Award nominations, in addition to being shortlisted for the 2015 Mercury Prize.

== Background ==
In 2011, Florence and the Machine released their second studio album, Ceremonials, which was their second consecutive release to peak at number one on the UK Albums Chart, as well as the first to reach the top 10 of the US Billboard 200, peaking at number six. The album included the song "Spectrum (Say My Name)", which was remixed by the Scottish musician Calvin Harris and became the group's first number-one single on the UK Singles Chart in July 2012. In late August 2012, Welch told Style.com that she would take a year-long break from music, explaining, "There's a big 'take a year off' plan. The record company have put no pressure on me for the next album. They've said I can have as long as I want." During her break, Welch made a guest appearance on Calvin Harris's album 18 Months, providing vocals on the track "Sweet Nothing", which topped the UK chart.

== Conception and recording ==
In an interview with Zane Lowe on 16 February 2015, Welch said that during the year off she had "a bit of a nervous breakdown", and that time was chaotic. The break was new for her, having almost constantly been at work during the making of the band's first two albums. She explained further, saying, "I was still going out and going to events but something wasn't quite right, I was spiraling a bit. I wasn't making myself happy. I wasn't stable." It allowed her to reassess her musical approach to reflect her own life experiences, with encouragement from producer Markus Dravs. Overall, the recording sessions for How Big, How Blue, How Beautiful were conducted during a vulnerable period in her life, making the album her most personal work thus far.

Welch began composing the material for How Big, How Blue, How Beautiful after concluding the band's touring in support of Ceremonials in 2014. Regarding the album's themes, she said in a press statement, "I guess although I've always dealt in fantasy and metaphor when I came to writing, that meant the songs this time were dealing much more in reality. Ceremonials was so fixated on death and water, and the idea of escape or transcendence through death, but the new album became about trying to learn how to live, and how to love in the world rather than trying to escape from it. Which is frightening because I'm not hiding behind anything but it felt like something I had to do." Welch also told Lowe that Dravs was instrumental in exploring her lyrical versatility, as he forbade her to write any more songs about water, a main theme in her past compositions. Still, she managed to write "Ship to Wreck", a song which she jokingly commented was "not too explicit" in comparison to her past works.

On 4 June 2014, Welch told NME that the band's third studio album was in the works. There was an emphasised effort to avoid heavily orchestrating the instrumental arrangements, or as Welch described it, "make Ceremonials Part Two", as she believed the predecessor had reached its creative peak. Welch said that she wanted to work with Dravs on the album, as he produced Björk's Homogenic (1997), an important album to Welch. "I felt he had that balance of organic and electronic capabilities, managing those two worlds. And, you know, he's good with big sounds. And I like big sounds. And he's good with trumpets, and I knew I wanted a brass section on this record", she said in the press release. "With Markus, I wanted to make something that was big but that had a gentleness to it, that had a warmth, that was rooted. I think that's why we went back more to the live instruments. Something that was band-led almost", she added. The final track on the album, "Mother", was co-produced by Dravs and Paul Epworth.

== Promotion ==
On 10 February 2015, Florence and the Machine released a music video featuring a snippet of the album's title track, "How Big, How Blue, How Beautiful". The video, which showed Welch dancing with her look-alike, was directed by Tabitha Denholm and Vincent Haycock, and served as an album teaser.

The band performed "What Kind of Man" and "Ship to Wreck" on Later... with Jools Holland on 28 April 2015. On 9 May, the band performed both songs on Saturday Night Live. The group performed "Ship to Wreck" on The Tonight Show Starring Jimmy Fallon on June 2.

The band performed at numerous European festivals in summer 2015, including Way Out West in Sweden, headlining Glastonbury festival, Super Bock Super Rock in Portugal and Rock Werchter in Belgium, among others. On 9 September 2015, the group's tour in support of the album kicked off in Belfast, Northern Ireland.

=== The Odyssey ===
Starting on 12 February 2015, the band released a series of Vincent Haycock-directed music videos for several songs from the album, with each video acting as a chapter in a story titled The Odyssey. The complete 47-minute short film premiered via the band's website on 25 April 2016, consisting of all previously released videos, as well as new connecting scenes and a new final chapter, set to "Third Eye". Haycock explained that The Odyssey follows "Florence's personal journey to find herself again after the emotional storm of a heartbreak. Like the layers of Dante's purgatory, each song or chapter represents a battle that Florence traversed and physical landscape that embodied each song or story."

- Chapter 1: "What Kind of Man"
- Chapter 2: "How Big, How Blue, How Beautiful" (connecting scene different to teaser video)
- Chapter 3: "St. Jude"
- Chapter 4: "Ship to Wreck"
- Chapter 5: "Queen of Peace"
- Chapter 6: "Long & Lost"
- Chapter 7: "Mother" (connecting scene)
- Chapter 8: "Delilah"
- Chapter 9: "Third Eye"
- Credits: "Various Storms & Saints"

== Singles ==
"What Kind of Man" was released as the lead single from the album two days after the "How Big, How Blue, How Beautiful" teaser. The song was premiered on BBC Radio 1 on 12 February 2015 at 7:30 p.m. local time along with an announcement of the album's release date, title and track listing. The music video, directed by Vincent Haycock and choreographed by Ryan Heffington, premiered online shortly afterwards, along with the album's pre-order. The single reached number 37 on the UK Singles Chart and number 88 on the US Billboard Hot 100. On 18 April 2015, "What Kind of Man" was issued as a limited-edition 12-inch vinyl for Record Store Day, featuring "As Far as I Could Get" as its B-side.

"Ship to Wreck" was released as the second single on 9 April 2015. The music video for the song, also shot by Haycock, choreographed by Heffington and filmed in Welch's own house, was released on 13 April. The track peaked at number 27 on the UK chart.

"Queen of Peace" was released as the third single on 4 September 2015. The music video was issued prior to the single on 27 July 2015 as a 10-minute double-feature, including the song "Long and Lost", and was filmed on the Scottish island of Easdale.

"Delilah" was released as the fourth and final single from the album on 27 November 2015. The track premiered as a Hottest Record on Annie Mac's BBC Radio 1 show on 19 May 2015, and its accompanying music video premiered on 21 October. The song, along with its demo version, was released as a limited-edition 12-inch vinyl for Record Store Day on 16 April 2016, including a cover of Neil Young's "Only Love Can Break Your Heart" as its B-side.

=== Other songs ===
A music video for "St. Jude" premiered on 23 March 2015. Considered to be a continuation of the video for "What Kind of Man", it was also directed by Haycock and choreographed by Heffington and sees Florence Welch "traveling through their version of the Divine Comedy."

== Critical reception ==
Professional ratings
Aggregate scores
Source	Rating
AnyDecentMusic?	7.4/10
Metacritic	77/100
Review scores
Source	Rating
AllMusic	3.5/5 stars
Billboard	4/5 stars
The Daily Telegraph	4/5 stars
Entertainment Weekly	A−
The Guardian	3/5 stars
NME	8/10
Pitchfork	7.6/10
Q	4/5 stars
Rolling Stone	3.5/5 stars
Spin	7/10

How Big, How Blue, How Beautiful received positive reviews from critics. At Metacritic, which assigns a weighted mean rating out of 100 to reviews from mainstream critics, the album received an average score of 77, based on 31 reviews. Kyle Anderson of Entertainment Weekly viewed How Big, How Blue, How Beautiful as "Florence + the Machine's most raw and stripped-down album to date", adding that "Welch may have gone slightly smaller with her sound, but her emotional depth and capacity for wonder remain gigantic." Michael Madden of Consequence of Sound hailed it as "the strongest Florence album to date" due to Welch having "reached a new level of eloquence in her writing, making her a more complete artist than ever", concluding that "it's apparent she's among her generation's most deserving superstars, maintaining a stunning balance of technical mastery and sensitive lyricism." Leonie Cooper of NME wrote, "Overflowing with stately songwriting and lyrical craftsmanship, How Big, How Blue, How Beautiful makes for a restrained but joyful return, and a collection that will last long after Welch's broken bones are mended." Carl Wilson of Billboard commented, "No matter the mood and tempo, though, the Florence & The Machine heard on How Big How Blue How Beautiful is a newly self-aware one. It shows a different kind of mastery by allowing for a different kind of vulnerability, an especially delicate balancing act for a young woman in pop music." Q hailed the band's thematic development, noting a "more righteous indignation" in the album's lyrics. In a four out of five star review, the New York Daily News observed that "[t]he songs have a canny way of avoiding genre cliches" and artistically, Welch "draws more from the new wave of Siouxsie and the Banshees or the pan-pop breadth of Annie Lennox's solo career".

Helen Brown of The Daily Telegraph praised the album as "thunderous" and stated that Welch "has turned her turmoil into a powerful record, adding a new spiritual depth and mature awareness to the thrill of the wild emotions she has always been able to pump so fearlessly out of her mighty heart and lungs." Douglas Wolk of Pitchfork described the album as "a huge, sturdy record, built for arenas [...] and it's richly and carefully enough constructed to endure the extensive exposure Welch's heartache is going to get over the course of this summer." Will Hermes of Rolling Stone opined that "Welch isn't the most rhythmic singer; she's more about powerful held notes and dramatic articulation, and her rock moves have sometimes felt fussy in the past. But here, she punches like a prizefighter." James Christopher Monger of AllMusic expressed that Welch's "Brit-pop soul treacle is still miles better than some of her contemporaries' top-tier offerings, and when the album connects it moves right in and starts to redecorate, but when it falters, it's akin to a chatty party guest failing to realize that everyone else has gone home." In a less enthusiastic review, Andrew Unterberger of Spin dubbed the album "an exceedingly coherent listen, both in terms of consistent production and lyrical themes [...] But it's not a great album, and that's because the production and dynamics are so compressed to soupy church-soul consistency that once you get into the thick of the LP, it's virtually impossible to keep your attention rapt throughout." Alexis Petridis of The Guardian felt that the album is "too overblown and daft for the songs to have the desired emotional impact: it's never really intimate enough for the feelings Welch expresses to connect."

=== Accolades ===
How Big, How Blue, How Beautiful was shortlisted for the 2015 Mercury Prize. It also received five nominations at the 2016 Grammy Awards, including Best Pop Vocal Album and Best Recording Package for the album, Best Rock Song and Best Rock Performance for "What Kind of Man", and Best Pop Duo/Group Performance for "Ship to Wreck". The Odyssey was nominated for Breakthrough Long Form Video at the 2016 MTV Video Music Awards. The albums was also ranked at number 68 on the list of the 100 Best Albums of the 2010s by Rolling Stone.

Publication	List	Rank
ABC News	50 Best Albums of 2015	17
American Songwriter	Top 50 Albums of 2015	32
Billboard	25 Best Albums of 2015	17
Consequence of Sound	Top 50 Albums of 2015	41
Entertainment Weekly	The 40 Best Albums of 2015	15
Gigwise	Albums of the Year	50
The Huffington Post	The Best Albums of 2015	6
NME	Albums of the Year 2015	40
Paste	The 50 Best Albums of 2015	29
PopMatters	The 80 Best Albums of 2015	44
People	Best Albums of 2015	5
Q	Top 50 Albums of 2015	10
Radio X	The 25 Best Indie Albums of 2015	11
Rolling Stone	50 Best Albums of 2015	22
Rolling Stone	20 Best Pop Albums of 2015	3
Rolling Stone	100 Best Albums of the 2010s	68
Time Out London	The 50 Best Albums of 2015	4
Under the Radar	Top 100 Albums of 2015	36

== Commercial performance ==
How Big, How Blue, How Beautiful debuted at number one on the UK Albums Chart with first-week sales of 68,788 copies, earning the band their third consecutive number-one album. The album slipped to number two for two weeks in a row, before reclaiming the number-one spot in its fourth week on the chart, with 14,419 copies sold. In the United States, the album debuted atop the Billboard 200 with 137,000 album-equivalent units, of which 128,000 were pure album sales. It marked the band's first number-one album on the chart, as well as their largest sales week. As of December 2015, How Big, How Blue, How Beautiful had sold 290,000 copies in the US. The album debuted at number one on the Canadian Albums Chart, selling 19,000 copies in its first week. In Australia, the album debuted at the top of the charts, with sales of 15,706 copies.

Elsewhere, How Big, How Blue, How Beautiful topped the charts in Ireland, New Zealand, Poland and Switzerland, while reaching the top five in Austria, Belgium, Denmark, Germany, the Netherlands, Norway, Portugal and Spain, and the top 10 in Finland, Greece, Italy and Sweden. As of February 2016, the album had sold one million copies worldwide.

== Track listing ==
No.	Title	Writer(s)	Producer(s)	Length
1.	"Ship to Wreck"	Florence Welch; Tom Hull	Markus Dravs; Kid Harpoon	3:54
2.	"What Kind of Man"	Welch; Hull; John Hill	Dravs; Hill^{[a]}	3:36
3.	"How Big, How Blue, How Beautiful"	Welch; Isabella Summers	Dravs	5:34
4.	"Queen of Peace"	Welch; Dravs	Dravs	5:07
5.	"Various Storms & Saints"	Welch; Dravs	Dravs	4:09
6.	"Delilah"	Welch; Summers	Dravs	4:53
7.	"Long & Lost"	Welch; Ester Dean	Dravs	3:15
8.	"Caught"	Welch; James Ford	Dravs	4:24
9.	"Third Eye"	Welch	Dravs	4:20
10.	"St. Jude"	Welch; Ford	Dravs	3:45
11.	"Mother"	Welch; Paul Epworth	Epworth	5:49

Limited edition 7-inch vinyl box set bonus track
No.	Title	Writer(s)	Length
12.	"As Far as I Could Get"	Welch; Ford	4:05

Deluxe edition bonus tracks
No.	Title	Writer(s)	Producer(s)	Length
12.	"Hiding"	Welch; Ford	Ford	3:52
13.	"Make Up Your Mind"	Welch; Hull	Charlie Hugall; Kid Harpoon^{[a]}	4:01
14.	"Which Witch" (Demo)	Welch; Summers	Isabella "Machine" Summers	4:19
15.	"Third Eye" (Demo)	Welch	Brett Shaw	4:15
16.	"How Big, How Blue, How Beautiful" (Demo)	Welch; Summers	Summers	4:32

Target exclusive edition additional tracks
No.	Title	Writer(s)	Producer(s)	Length
17.	"Pure Feeling"	Welch; Ford	Hugall	4:08
18.	"Conductor"	Welch; Dan Wilson	Wilson	4:52

=== Notes ===
- ^{^[a]} signifies a co-producer

== Personnel ==
Credits adapted from the liner notes of the deluxe edition of How Big, How Blue, How Beautiful.

=== Florence and the Machine ===
- Florence Welch – vocals (all tracks); backing vocals (tracks 1–10, 12, 13); body percussion (track 9); stamps, claps (track 14); piano, percussion (track 15)
- Chris Hayden – drums (tracks 1–3, 6–9, 13); percussion (tracks 1, 2, 6, 8, 13)
- Rob Ackroyd – electric guitar (tracks 1, 2, 4, 7–9); acoustic guitar (tracks 3, 13); ukulele (track 9)
- Mark Saunders – bass (tracks 2–4, 6–9)
- Isabella Summers – Rhodes organ (track 3); programming, drums, synths, bass, keys (tracks 14, 16); strings, stamps, claps (track 14); Rhodes, percussion (track 16)
- Rusty Bradshaw – piano (track 4)
- Tom Monger – harp (track 13)

=== Additional musicians ===
- Kid Harpoon – drums, percussion, bass, CP70 synth (track 1); electric guitar (tracks 1, 13); brass writing, brass arrangements (track 2); acoustic guitar, piano (track 13)
- Leo Abrahams – acoustic guitar (track 1); electric guitar (tracks 2, 4–6, 9)
- James Hallawell – Hammond organ (tracks 1, 4); Farfisa, piano, organ (track 7)
- Markus Dravs – glockenspiel (track 1); percussion, synths (track 2); bass synth (track 5); programming (tracks 7, 10); body percussion, electric guitar (track 9); woodwind arrangements (track 10)
- Janelle Martin – backing vocals (tracks 1–4, 9)
- Nim Miller – backing vocals (tracks 1–4, 9)
- Baby N'Sola – backing vocals (tracks 1–4, 9)
- John Hill – synths, brass writing, brass arrangements (track 2)
- Nigel Black – French horn (tracks 2–4, 9)
- Pip Eastop – French horn (tracks 2–4, 9)
- Sam Jacobs – French horn (tracks 2–4, 9)
- Elise Campbell – French horn (tracks 2–4, 9)
- John Barclay – trumpet (tracks 2–4, 9); piccolo trumpet (track 3)
- Philip Cobb – trumpet (tracks 2–4, 9); flugel trumpet (track 3)
- Andy Crowley – trumpet (tracks 2–4, 9)
- Tom Rees-Roberts – trumpet (tracks 2–4, 9)
- Andy Wood – Euphonium (tracks 2–4, 9); trombone (track 4)
- Ed Tarrant – Euphonium (tracks 2–4, 9)
- Richard Edwards – tenor trombone (tracks 2–4, 9)
- Oren Marshall – tuba (tracks 2–4, 9)
- Steve Jones – electric guitar (tracks 3, 7)
- Robin Baynton – Rhodes organ (track 3); piano (tracks 3, 6, 9); organ (track 6)
- Pete Prokopiw – harp, cimbalom (track 3); programming (tracks 6, 7, 10)
- Will Owen – brass arrangements (track 3); string arrangements (tracks 3, 5)
- Ali Helnwein – brass arrangements, string arrangements (track 3); strings (track 16)
- Sally Herbert – orchestration (tracks 3–5, 10); conducting (tracks 3–5); flute arrangements, brass arrangements, string arrangements (track 4); brass orchestration, brass conducting (track 9); woodwind arrangements (track 10)
- Ian Humphries – violin (tracks 3, 5)
- Ian Belton – violin (tracks 3, 5)
- Emlyn Singleton – violin (tracks 3, 5)
- Patrick Kiernan – violin (tracks 3, 5)
- Julia Singleton – violin (tracks 3, 5)
- John Smart – violin (tracks 3, 5)
- Ann Morfee – violin (tracks 3, 5)
- Natalia Bonner – violin (tracks 3, 5)
- Sonia Slany – violin (tracks 3, 5)
- Gillon Cameron – violin (tracks 3–5)
- Ciaran McCabe – violin (tracks 3, 5)
- Alison Dods – violin (tracks 3, 5)
- Fiona Bonds – viola (tracks 3, 5)
- Ian Rathbone – viola (tracks 3, 5)
- Max Baillie – viola (tracks 3, 5)
- Rachel Robson – viola (tracks 3, 5)
- Ian Burdge – cello (tracks 3–5)
- Chris Worsey – cello (tracks 3, 5)
- Nick Cooper – cello (tracks 3, 5)
- Sophie Harris – cello (tracks 3, 5)
- Richard Pryce – bass (tracks 3, 5)
- Lucy Shaw – bass (tracks 3, 5)
- Eliza Marshall – flute, alto flute (tracks 3, 4)
- Matt Ingram – drums, percussion (track 4)
- Benson – additional keys, programming, flute arrangements, brass arrangements, string arrangements (track 4); backing vocals (track 7)
- Daniel Newell – piccolo trumpet, flugel, trumpet (track 4)
- Everton Nelson – violin (track 4)
- Rick Koster – violin (track 4)
- Oli Langford – violin (track 4)
- Bruce White – viola (track 4)
- Nick Barr – viola (track 4)
- Iain Berryman – piano, harmonium, acoustic guitar (track 8); body percussion, cornet (track 9)
- James Ford – programming (tracks 10, 12); woodwind arrangements (track 10); drums, bass, guitar, keys, percussion, piano, synths (track 12)
- Rebecca Wood – oboe, cor anglais (track 10)
- Pete Harrison – bassoon (track 10)
- Paul Epworth – drums, bass, guitar, synths, organ, percussion (track 11)
- Orlando Leopard – piano, bass, harmonium, organ, additional arrangement (track 13)
- Charlie Hugall – programming, percussion (track 13)
- Wayne Francis – saxophone (track 14)
- Nick Walters – trumpet (track 14)
- Adman Dayes – trombone (track 14)
- Brett Shaw – additional percussion (track 15)
- Alex Beitzke – guitar (track 16)

=== Technical ===
- Markus Dravs – production (tracks 1–10)
- Kid Harpoon – production (track 1); co-production (track 13)
- Robin Baynton – engineering (tracks 1–7, 9, 10); strings recording, brass recording, flute recording (track 4); woodwind recording (track 10)
- Jonathan Sagis – engineering assistance (tracks 1–10)
- Iain Berryman – engineering assistance (tracks 1, 3–10); additional engineering (track 2)
- Mark "Spike" Stent – mixing (tracks 1, 2, 9, 12)
- Geoff Swan – mixing assistance (tracks 1, 2, 9, 12)
- Ted Jensen – mastering (all tracks)
- John Hill – co-production (track 2)
- Joe Kearns – additional engineering (track 2); engineering (track 8)
- Mat Bartram – brass recording (tracks 2–4, 9); strings recording (tracks 3–5); flute recording (tracks 3, 4); engineering (track 5)
- Ronan Phelan – brass recording assistance (tracks 2–4, 9); strings recording assistance (tracks 3–5); flute recording assistance (tracks 3, 4)
- Craig Silvey – mixing (tracks 3–8, 10, 11)
- Eduardo de la Paz – mixing assistance (tracks 3–8, 10, 11)
- Dan Cox – additional engineering (track 4)
- Paul Epworth – production (track 11)
- James Ford – production (track 12)
- Jimmy Robertson – engineering (track 12)
- Charlie Hugall – production, engineering (track 13); mixing (tracks 13, 14)
- Will Donbavand – mixing assistance (track 13)
- Isabella "Machine" Summers – production (tracks 14, 16)
- Ben Roulston – engineering (tracks 14, 16)
- Alex Beitzke – engineering (tracks 14, 16)
- John Catlin – mixing assistance (track 14)
- Brett Shaw – production, engineering, mixing (track 15)

=== Artwork ===
- Tabitha Denholm – creative direction, insert photography
- Brian Roettinger – art direction
- Tom Beard – cover photography, insert photography
- Vincent Haycock – insert photography

== Charts ==
=== Weekly charts ===
Weekly chart performance for How Big, How Blue, How Beautiful
Chart (2015–2016)	Peak position
Australian Albums (ARIA)	1
Austrian Albums (Ö3 Austria)	2
Belgian Albums (Ultratop Flanders)	2
Belgian Albums (Ultratop Wallonia)	7
Canadian Albums (Billboard)	1
Croatian Albums (HDU)	14
Czech Albums (ČNS IFPI)	13
Danish Albums (Hitlisten)	3
Dutch Albums (Album Top 100)	3
Finnish Albums (Suomen virallinen lista)	9
French Albums (SNEP)	13
German Albums (Offizielle Top 100)	3
Greek Albums (IFPI)	7
Hungarian Albums (MAHASZ)	11
Irish Albums (IRMA)	1
Italian Albums (FIMI)	7
New Zealand Albums (RMNZ)	1
Norwegian Albums (VG-lista)	2
Polish Albums (ZPAV)	1
Portuguese Albums (AFP)	5
Scottish Albums (Official Charts)	1
South Korean Albums (Gaon) Deluxe edition	47
Spanish Albums (Promusicae)	4
Swedish Albums (Sverigetopplistan)	6
Swiss Albums (Schweizer Hitparade)	1
UK Albums (Official Charts)	1
US Billboard 200	1
US Top Alternative Albums (Billboard)	1
US Top Rock Albums (Billboard)	1
US Indie Store Album Sales (Billboard)	1

=== Year-end charts ===
2015 year-end chart performance for How Big, How Blue, How Beautiful
Chart (2015)	Position
Australian Albums (ARIA)	10
Austrian Albums (Ö3 Austria)	73
Belgian Albums (Ultratop Flanders)	10
Belgian Albums (Ultratop Wallonia)	89
Canadian Albums (Billboard)	24
Dutch Albums (Album Top 100)	67
German Albums (Offizielle Top 100)	72
Irish Albums (IRMA)	17
New Zealand Albums (RMNZ)	15
Polish Albums (ZPAV)	15
Swiss Albums (Schweizer Hitparade)	57
UK Albums (OCC)	19
US Billboard 200	86
US Top Alternative Albums (Billboard)	9
US Top Rock Albums (Billboard)	12

2016 year-end chart performance for How Big, How Blue, How Beautiful
Chart (2016)	Position
Australian Albums (ARIA)	97
Belgian Albums (Ultratop Flanders)	106
Polish Albums (ZPAV)	23

== Certifications and sales ==
Certifications and sales for How Big, How Blue, How Beautiful
Region	Certification	Certified units/sales
Australia (ARIA)	Platinum	70,000^{^}
Austria (IFPI Austria)	Gold	7,500^{*}
Brazil (Pro-Música Brasil) Deluxe	Gold	20,000^{‡}
Germany (BVMI)	Gold	100,000^{‡}
New Zealand (RMNZ)	Platinum	15,000^{‡}
Poland (ZPAV)	3× Platinum	60,000^{‡}
United Kingdom (BPI)	Platinum	359,588
United States (RIAA)	Gold	500,000^{‡}
Summaries
Worldwide	—	1,000,000
^{*} Sales figures based on certification alone.^{^} Shipments figures based on certification alone.^{‡} Sales+streaming figures based on certification alone.

== Release history ==
Release dates and formats for How Big, How Blue, How Beautiful
Region	Date	Format	Edition	Label	Ref(s)
Australia	29 May 2015	CD; digital download	Standard; deluxe	Universal	
Germany	29 May 2015	CD; digital download	Standard; deluxe	Universal	
Germany	29 May 2015	LP	Standard	Universal	
Ireland	29 May 2015	CD; digital download	Standard; deluxe	Island	
Ireland	29 May 2015	LP	Standard	Island	
France	1 June 2015	CD; digital download	Standard; deluxe	Universal	
France	1 June 2015	LP	Standard	Universal	
United Kingdom	1 June 2015	CD; digital download	Standard; deluxe	Island	
United Kingdom	1 June 2015	LP	Standard	Island	
United Kingdom	1 June 2015	7-inch vinyl box set	Limited	Island	
United States	2 June 2015	CD; digital download	Standard; deluxe	Republic	
United States	2 June 2015	LP	Standard	Republic	
Australia	19 June 2015	LP	Standard	Universal	
