= Hanover Band =

British period-instrument orchestra

The Hanover Band is a British orchestra specialised in historically informed performance, founded in 1980 by its late artistic director, Caroline Brown (1953-2018).

The group's website explains the name thus: 'Hanover' signifies the Hanoverian period 1714-1830 and 'Band' is the 18th century term for orchestra.

Its principal and guest conductors and directors have included Monica Huggett, Sir Charles Mackerras, Roy Goodman, Anthony Halstead, Nicholas McGegan, Graham Lea-Cox, Richard Egarr, Nicholas Kraemer, Paul Brough, Andrew Arthur and Benjamin Bayl.

The Hanover Band has appeared at the Carnegie Hall, Amsterdam Concertgebouw, Bridgewater Hall (Manchester), South Bank Centre, Royal Albert Hall and Wigmore Hall, among many other venues. They have toured the UK many times, made ten tours of the United States and performed in Canada, Mexico, Austria, Germany, Switzerland, France, Portugal, Spain, Belgium, Netherlands, Norway, Greece & Turkey. The orchestra made its debut in China, in the Beijing Festival in May 2017.

The Hanover Band has made 176 recordings on Nimbus Records, Hyperion Records, Sony, EMI Eminence, RCA and other labels, including a complete cycle of the orchestral works of Johann Christian Bach for cpo.
