= Anthony Halstead =

British musician

Anthony Halstead (born 18 June 1945 in Manchester, England) is a leading figure in the period-instruments movement. First known as a virtuoso on the natural horn, he has gradually moved into the role of conductor and has directed the Academy of Ancient Music, the Orchestra of the Age of Enlightenment, and most notably Hanover Band. He also plays harpsichord and piano.

== Biography ==
Halstead attended Chetham's School and the Royal Manchester College of Music, studying piano at first, as well as horn, organ, and composition. At the suggestion of his horn teacher Sydney Coulston, Halstead began to specialise in the horn. He was first horn with the English Chamber Orchestra from 1972 to 1986, and has also been a member of other noted orchestras such as the London Symphony Orchestra. He has also been a professor at the Guildhall School of Music.

During the 1980s and early 1990s, Halstead served as both a member of the horn section and as horn soloist for several period-instruments groups and recorded widely. His many recordings in both capacities include (as part of the orchestra) Beethoven's Five Piano Concertos under Christopher Hogwood (with Steven Lubin as the fortepiano soloist, L'Oiseau Lyre 421 408–2); the same composer's Ninth Symphony under Roger Norrington (EMI CDC 7492212); Mozart's opera Idomeneo conducted by John Eliot Gardiner (Archiv 431 674–2); and (as horn soloist) chamber music by Johann Christian Bach with Trevor Pinnock and members of The English Concert (Archiv 423 385–2); and Mozart's Horn Concerti with Hanover Band directed by Roy Goodman (Nimbus NI 5104).

Halstead turned increasingly during the 1990s to conducting. Though most famous at that time as a horn virtuoso, he was no novice at leading an orchestra, having studied conducting with Sir Charles Mackerras (who also inspired Barry Tuckwell to take up the horn) and Michael Rose; his professional conducting debut had been in 1976 directing the premiere of Elisabeth Lutyens' One and the Same. For the record label CPO, Halstead embarked on a project to record all the orchestral music of Johann Christian Bach with Hanover Band on 22 CDs. For the J.C. Bach keyboard concertos (CPO 999 930-2), Halstead himself performed the solo part on harpsichord (which he had studied with George Malcolm) and fortepiano, as well as directed the orchestra. With the same ensemble and record label, Halstead also recorded the Op. 17 symphonies of Carl Friedrich Abel (CPO 999 214–2).

No stranger to modern orchestras, Halstead has also directed the English Chamber Orchestra and BBC Scottish Symphony Orchestra as well as other ensembles. He also conducted the Scottish Chamber Orchestra in two of the three CDs of Luigi Boccherini's complete cello concerti released by Naxos Records (Vol. 1, catalogue number 8.553571, and Vol. 2, catalogue number 8.553572); in these recordings, Halstead's soloist was the cellist Tim Hugh.

Halstead's conducting has also been featured on many other recordings, and he has been invited to conduct in Scandinavia, Germany, Australia, Japan, and Spain. According to his website, he also is involved in private teaching and chamber music coaching, as well as serving as a guest professor in many conservatories in the United Kingdom and a prominent member of the British Horn Society.
