= Pip Eastop =

British musician (born 1958)

Pip Eastop (born 1958) is a virtuoso horn player from London. He studied at the Royal Academy of Music from 1974 to 1976, leaving to take up the position of Principal Horn with the Flanders Philharmonic (now known as the Antwerp Symphony Orchestra). The following year he became Principal Horn of the London Sinfonietta.

Between 1983 and 1986, Eastop trained as a teacher of the Alexander Technique and from 1987 taught this discipline for four years, later incorporating his understanding of the technique into his brass teaching method. He contributed to the chapter on 'Playing, learning and teaching brass' in the Cambridge Companion to Brass Instruments.

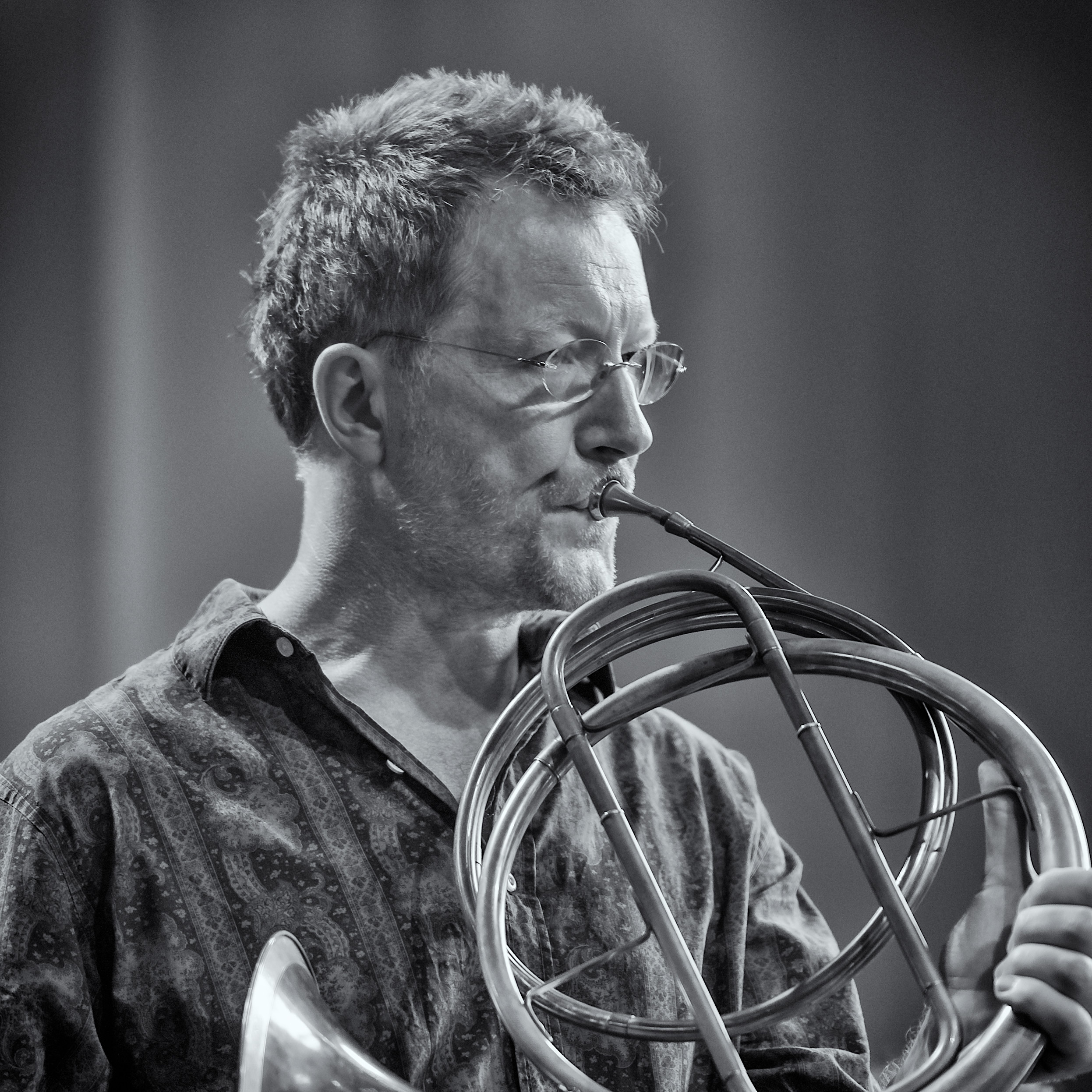
Pip Eastop recording Mozart's horn concertos with the Hanover Band

Eastop was a professor of horn at the Royal Academy of Music from 1993 to 2007 and at the Royal College of Music from 1995 to 2019. He was named a Fellow of the Royal Academy of Music in 2000.

In addition to holding principal positions with the London Chamber Orchestra and Oxford Philharmonic Orchestra, Eastop has been guest principal with all the major London symphony orchestras and smaller groups such as the Orchestra of the Age of Enlightenment and London Mozart Players. He has also performed extensively with the Aurora Orchestra, including playing the solo part in Benjamin Britten's Serenade for Tenor, Horn and Strings at Kings Place and Snape Maltings Concert Hall with British tenor Allan Clayton.

In 1996, the Arts Council of Great Britain awarded Eastop a research development grant to explore "the possibilities of controlling computer-driven transformation of sound during live, partially improvised performance". This work was undertaken in collaboration with the composer Edward Williams. Eastop's interest in music technology subsequently led him to create his own piece for solo horn and loopstation, Sea Bells, which he premiered at the British Horn Festival in 2011.

His recording of the Mozart horn concertos with Anthony Halstead and the Hanover Band was released in 2015. Reviews of this album praised Eastop's 'refined legato' (Gramophone) and 'cheeky virtuosity' (The Arts Desk), while his cadenzas were described by one reviewer as 'wild and wacky' (Financial Times). These cadenzas were published in 2024 by Clifton Edition.

Eastop's next recording project was a two-album series of improvisations for horn and organ with Susanne Kujala in the Organo hall of Helsinki Music Centre. Captured live at the first ever Brass @ Sibelius Academy festival in June 2016, this collaboration was an experiment in what Eastop calls "co-composing in realtime, 'writing' not with pen and paper but instead with microphones and digital recording media".

He went on to collaborate again with Anthony Halstead for his 2020 album Set the Wild Echoes Flying, a seven-movement work for natural horn and narrator that features four poems and extensive musical allusions from Britten's Serenade. This recording has been lauded as 'utterly remarkable' and a 'superhuman achievement' (Classical Explorer).

Eastop retired from playing the horn in 2022 to concentrate on composing and producing. He appears as trumpet/flugelhorn soloist on three tracks from the 2024 album 1325 Ibn Battutah by UK-Middle Eastern band Syriana, and was commissioned by London's Fitzrovia Arts Festival to write a new work for oboe and fixed media that premiered in June 2025.

== Recordings ==
- Pip Eastop on Bandcamp
- Pip Eastop on Spotify
- Three Worlds Records
- Hyperion Records

== Publications ==
- Set the Wild Echoes Flying for solo horn (and narrator) (edition db 0702040)
- Mozart Horn Concertos: The Cadenzas (Clifton Edition C492)
