= What Kind of Man (Florence and the Machine song) =

2015 single by Florence and the Machine

- 12-inch single cover

Single by Florence and the Machine

from the album How Big, How Blue, How Beautiful
- B-side: "As Far as I Could Get"
- Released: 12 February 2015
- Studio: The Pool (London)
- Genre: Garage rock; pop
- Length: 3:36
- Label: Island
- Songwriters: Florence Welch; Tom Hull; John Hill
- Producer: Markus Dravs

Florence and the Machine singles chronology
"Lover to Lover" (2012)	"What Kind of Man" (2015)	"Ship to Wreck" (2015)

Music video
- "What Kind of Man" on YouTube

"What Kind of Man" is a song by English indie rock band Florence and the Machine from their third studio album, How Big, How Blue, How Beautiful (2015). It was written by Florence Welch, Kid Harpoon and John Hill, produced by Markus Dravs and co-produced by Hill. The song was released on 12 February 2015 as the album's lead single. "What Kind of Man" received Grammy Award nominations for Best Rock Performance and Best Rock Song.

== Composition ==
According to lead vocalist Florence Welch, the song represents a new guitar-driven sonic direction for the band. "It's got very loud guitars and that was very fun to record actually", she said in an interview. "Trying to get exactly the right tone of guitar—I never realised how complicated that is. It took us forever.... Every day there'd be a different guitar sound. We ended up layering with three different guitar sounds, one on top of the other, in order to create this one song."

The song builds slowly and breaks into a heavy beat with tambourine and bass drum, and then becomes a textured pop song with heavy brass arrangements. The song lyrically focuses on an indecisive man who wronged Welch.

== Critical reception ==
"What Kind of Man" received acclaim from music critics. Al Horner of NME wrote, "Musically, it's big. Wagnerian backing vocals and horn blasts turn 'What Kind Of Man' into a spectacle worthy of [Welch's] new festival headliner status". Dee Lockett of Vulture dubbed it a "fiery rocker". Andrew Unterberger of Spin opined that the song "starts off a letdown, but quickly proves to be ['Ship to Wreck''s] roaring equal, with the unexpected arrival of a thick guitar chop and regal horn salute that gives Florence the instrumental support she deserves as she excoriates an uncommitted significant other".

== Commercial performance ==
"What Kind of Man" debuted at number 57 on the UK Singles Chart, peaking at number 37 the following week. In the United States, the song reached number eight on the Billboard Alternative Songs chart, tying with the band's 2008 single "Dog Days Are Over" and subsequent single "Ship to Wreck" as their highest-peaking single on that chart. As of July 2018, the song had sold 177,000 copies and had been streamed 11.2 million times in the United Kingdom.

== Music video ==
The music video for "What Kind of Man", directed by Vincent Haycock and choreographed by Ryan Heffington, premiered on 12 February 2015. Filmed in Los Angeles and Mérida, Mexico, the video is a short film that includes dialogue about the unifying power of tragedy in a relationship between a couple as they drive down a country road. Scenes of the couple driving at various points in their relationship are interspersed with examples of the woman and her relationships with different men, often taking on a smothering quality. The woman later is the centre of religious rituals that involve her being lifted by several men, including her love interest played by Richie Stephens, speaking in tongues, baptism and exorcism.

== Track listings ==
- Digital download – Nicolas Jaar Remix
1. "What Kind of Man" (Nicolas Jaar Remix) – 12:21
- Limited-edition 12-inch single (Record Store Day exclusive)

A. "What Kind of Man"
B. "As Far as I Could Get"

== Credits and personnel ==
Credits adapted from the liner notes of How Big, How Blue, How Beautiful.

=== Recording ===
- Engineered at The Pool (London)
- Mixed at The Mixsuite (UK)
- Mastered at Sterling Sound (New York City)

=== Personnel ===
Florence and the Machine

- Florence Welch – vocals, backing vocals
- Chris Hayden – drums, percussion
- Mark Saunders – bass
- Rob Ackroyd – electric guitar

Additional personnel

- Markus Dravs – production, percussion, synths
- John Hill – co-production, synths, brass writing, brass arrangements
- Robin Baynton – engineering
- Jonathan Sagis – engineering assistance
- Joe Kearns – additional engineering
- Iain Berryman – additional engineering
- Leo Abrahams – electric guitar
- Janelle Martin – backing vocals
- Nim Miller – backing vocals
- Baby N'Sola – backing vocals
- Kid Harpoon – brass writing, brass arrangements
- Nigel Black – French horn
- Pip Eastop – French horn
- Sam Jacobs – French horn
- Elise Campbell – French horn
- John Barclay – trumpet
- Andy Crowley – trumpet
- Philip Cobb – trumpet
- Tom Rees-Roberts – trumpet
- Andy Wood – Euphonium
- Ed Tarrant – Euphonium
- Richard Edwards – tenor trombone
- Oren Marshall – tuba
- Mat Bartram – brass recording
- Ronan Phelan – brass recording assistance
- Mark "Spike" Stent – mixing
- Geoff Swan – mixing assistance
- Ted Jensen – mastering

== Charts ==
=== Weekly charts ===
Weekly chart performance for "What Kind of Man"
Chart (2015)	Peak position
Australia (ARIA)	16
Austria (Ö3 Austria Top 40)	52
Belgium (Ultratop 50 Flanders)	50
Belgium (Ultratip Bubbling Under Wallonia)	37
Canada (Canadian Hot 100)	46
Canada Rock (Billboard)	2
France (SNEP)	74
Ireland (IRMA)	31
Italy (FIMI)	86
Japan Hot Overseas (Billboard)	19
New Zealand (Recorded Music NZ)	34
Scotland Singles (OCC)	25
Spain (PROMUSICAE)	44
Switzerland (Schweizer Hitparade)	42
UK Singles (OCC)	37
US Billboard Hot 100	88
US Hot Rock & Alternative Songs (Billboard)	7
US Rock & Alternative Airplay (Billboard)	7

=== Year-end charts ===
Year-end chart performance for "What Kind of Man"
Chart (2015)	Position
US Hot Rock & Alternative Songs (Billboard)	33
US Rock Airplay (Billboard)	41

== Certifications ==
Certifications for "What Kind of Man"
Region	Certification	Certified units/sales
Australia (ARIA)	Platinum	70,000^{‡}
Brazil (Pro-Música Brasil)	Gold	30,000^{‡}
New Zealand (RMNZ)	Gold	15,000^{‡}
United Kingdom (BPI)	Silver	200,000^{‡}
United States (RIAA)	Gold	500,000^{‡}
^{‡} Sales+streaming figures based on certification alone.

== Release history ==
Release dates and formats for "What Kind of Man"
Region	Date	Format	Label	Ref(s)
Canada	12 February 2015	Digital download	Island	
United States	12 February 2015	Digital download	Island	
Various	11 March 2015	Digital download – Nicolas Jaar Remix	Island	
Canada	15 March 2015	Digital download – Nicolas Jaar Remix	Island	
United States	15 March 2015	Digital download – Nicolas Jaar Remix	Island	
United Kingdom	13 April 2015	12-inch single (Note: Limited-edition release for Record Store Day)	Island	
United States	18 April 2015	12-inch single	Republic	
