= Queen of Peace (song) =

2015 single by Florence and the Machine

Single by Florence and the Machine

from the album How Big, How Blue, How Beautiful
- Released: 4 September 2015
- Studio: The Pool (London); Urchin (London); Angel (London)
- Genre: Rock
- Length: 5:07
- Label: Island
- Songwriter(s): Florence Welch; Markus Dravs
- Producer(s): Markus Dravs

Florence and the Machine singles chronology
"Ship to Wreck" (2015)	"Queen of Peace" (2015)	"Delilah" (2015)

Music video
- "Queen of Peace"/"Long and Lost" on YouTube

"Queen of Peace" is a song by English indie rock band Florence and the Machine from their third studio album, How Big, How Blue, How Beautiful (2015). It was written by Florence Welch and Markus Dravs, and produced by the latter. The song was released on 4 September 2015 as the album's third single. "Queen of Peace" debuted at number 178 on the UK Singles Chart, peaking three weeks later at number 133, the band's first single to miss the top 100 since "Lover to Lover" in 2012.

== Music video ==
A 10-minute double-feature music video for "Queen of Peace" and "Long & Lost", another track from How Big, How Blue, How Beautiful, was directed by Vincent Haycock and premiered on 27 July 2015. Shot on the Scottish island of Easdale, the short film is a part of a larger series of music videos centered on Welch and the storyline it creates known as The Odyssey.

== Track listing ==
- Digital download – Hot Chip Remix
1. "Queen of Peace" (Hot Chip Remix) – 6:25

== Credits and personnel ==
Credits adapted from the liner notes of How Big, How Blue, How Beautiful.

=== Recording ===
- Engineered at The Pool and Urchin Studios (London)
- Strings, brass and flute recorded at Angel Recording Studios and The Pool (London)
- Mixed at Toast Studios (London)
- Mastered at Sterling Sound (New York City)

=== Personnel ===
Florence and the Machine

- Florence Welch – vocals, backing vocals
- Mark Saunders – bass
- Rob Ackroyd – electric guitar
- Rusty Bradshaw – piano

Additional personnel

- Markus Dravs – production
- Robin Baynton – engineering, strings recording, brass recording, flute recording
- Jonathan Sagis – engineering assistance
- Iain Berryman – engineering assistance
- Dan Cox – additional engineering
- Matt Ingram – drums, percussion
- Leo Abrahams – electric guitar
- Rusty Bradshaw – piano
- James Hallawell – Hammond organ
- Benson – additional keys, programming, flute arrangements, brass arrangements, string arrangements
- Janelle Martin – backing vocals
- Nim Miller – backing vocals
- Baby N'Sola – backing vocals
- Sally Herbert – flute arrangements, brass arrangements, string arrangements, orchestration, conducting
- Daniel Newell – piccolo trumpet, flugel, trumpet
- Nigel Black – French horn
- Pip Eastop – French horn
- Sam Jacobs – French horn
- Elise Campbell – French horn
- Andy Wood – trombone, Euphonium
- John Barclay – trumpet
- Philip Cobb – trumpet
- Andy Crowley – trumpet
- Tom Rees-Roberts – trumpet
- Ed Tarrant – Euphonium
- Richard Edwards – tenor trombone
- Oren Marshall – tuba
- Everton Nelson – violin
- Gillon Cameron – violin
- Rick Koster – violin
- Oli Langford – violin
- Bruce White – viola
- Nick Barr – viola
- Ian Burdge – cello
- Eliza Marshall – flute, alto flute
- Mat Bartram – strings recording, brass recording, flute recording
- Ronan Phelan – strings recording assistance, brass recording assistance, flute recording assistance
- Craig Silvey – mixing
- Eduardo de la Paz – mixing assistance
- Ted Jensen – mastering

== Charts ==
Chart performance for "Queen of Peace"
Chart (2015)	Peak position
Belgium (Ultratip Bubbling Under Flanders)	2
Belgium (Ultratip Bubbling Under Wallonia)	39
UK Singles (OCC)	133

== Release history ==
Release dates and formats for "Queen of Peace"
Region	Date	Format	Label	Ref.
Various	4 September 2015	Digital download – Hot Chip Remix	Island	
