= Miss Baby Sol =

- Also known as: Baby Sol, Baby N'Sola
- Born: Zaire
- Origin: Democratic Republic of the Congo
- Genres: Alternative
- Occupations: Singer, songwriter
- Instrument: Vocals
- Label: Scarlet Air - 2011

Miss Baby Sol is a Zairean-English singer and songwriter. She was born in Zaire (now the Democratic Republic of the Congo) and resides in London.

== Musical career ==
In 2011, Miss Baby Sol released her debut EP, which included three singles, "Always", "No No" and "She Cries". "She Cries" was released in support of the efforts of Amnesty International to stop rape as a weapon of war as well as in recognition of its part in establishing the International Criminal Court.

=== Songwriting ===
In addition to her solo projects and charity work, Baby has collaborated and worked with a number of people in her capacity as a songwriter. These include her chart topping collaboration, as co-writer and vocalist, with UK dance producer Redlight as well as the 2014 campaign single for No More Page 3 "Now’s The Time".

=== Session vocalist ===
As a backing/session vocalist, Miss Baby Sol has worked with Paloma Faith, Rebecca Ferguson, Florence and The Machine, The Noisettes, ROX, Laura Mvula and STINKAHBELL, among others.

== Discography ==
- NMP3 feat Miss Baby Sol "Now the Time"
  - Baby Sol co writes the Christmas single for No More Page 3
  - Release date: 15-12-2014
- Torqux, Get Down
  - Baby Sol collaborates with Torqux on their second MTA EP Release
  - Release date: 23-09-2013
- Redlight, "Lost In Your Love"
  - Baby Sol collaborates with Redlight on his chart topping single Lost In Your Love
  - Release date: 02-08-2012
- Baby Sol, "She Cries" EP
  - Baby Sol releases She Cries in support of Amnesty International
  - Release date: 12-12-2011
- Baby Sol vs Stinkahbell "Always"
  - Baby Sol collaborates with dubstep duo Stinkahbell on the remix of "Always"
  - Release date: 12-09-2011
- Phil Asher & A.C. Layne feat Baby Sol, "We Can Make it Happen"
  - Baby Sol collaborates with house duo Phil Asher & A.C. Layne
  - Release date: 25-07-2011
- Shystie feat Miss Baby Sol, "TAG"
  - Taken from the long-awaited Shystie come back mixtape You’re Welcome
  - Release date: 29-04-2011
- Untold Songs: Volume One
  - Untold Songs Vol One compilation in conjunction with Amnesty International features Baby Sol's "No No"
  - Release date: 13-06-2011
- Before I Begin the Journey Baby Sol Debut EP
  - Baby Sol releases her 7 track limited edition debut EP
  - Release date: 10-01-2011
- BlackEinstein feat Miss Baby Sol, "Common Ground"
  - Taken from the forthcoming B.E. Bowie influenced/inspired EP “Whatever Happened To Major Tom”
  - Release date: 01-11-2010
- Mystro feat Baby Sol, "Don't Worry About it"
  - Baby Sol teams up with UK rapper Mystro on his much anticipated "Digmund Freud" EP.
  - Release date: 13-09-2010
- Lazy Habits feat Baby Sol, "Memory Banks"
  - "Memory Banks" is the debut single from Lazy Habits. The single is released 31 May 2010.
  - Release date: 31-05-2010
- Mop Mop, Ritual Of The Savage
  - Baby Sol teams up with Andrea Benini on his third studio album.
  - Release date: 09-04-2010
- Bopstar feat Baby Sol, "Material Thing"
  - Baby Sol collaborates with Bopstar on his first soulful house release of 2010, includes remixes from Aaron Ross and Zed Bias.
  - Release date: 29-03-2010
- Boot Shape feat Miss Baby Sol, "You Got Me"
  - Baby Sol collaborates with Italy-based producers DJ Afghan and Boot Shape on her first Tam Tam Studio release.
  - Release date: 29-10-2009
- SoulCulture presents: "Aaliyah Revisited"
  - Baby Sol and London-based producer Black Einstein team up to produce a cover of "Its Whatever" in the memory of Aaliyah Dana Haughton.
  - Release date: 25-08-2009
- Ironik feat Baby Sol, "So Nice"
  - Taken from the debut album No Point in Wasting Tears, Baby Sol lends her soulful vocal to this melodic UK Hip Hop track.
  - Release date: 11-05-2009
