= Delilah (Florence and the Machine song) =

2015 single by Florence and the Machine

- 12-inch single cover

Single by Florence and the Machine

from the album How Big, How Blue, How Beautiful
- B-side: "Only Love Can Break Your Heart" (live)
- Released: 27 November 2015
- Studio: The Pool (London)
- Genre: Pop; gospel; Northern soul
- Length: 4:53
- Label: Island
- Songwriters: Florence Welch; Isabella Summers
- Producer: Markus Dravs

Florence and the Machine singles chronology
"Queen of Peace" (2015)	"Delilah" (2015)	"Wish That You Were Here" (2016)

Music video
- "Delilah" on YouTube

"Delilah" is a song by English indie rock band Florence and the Machine from their third studio album, How Big, How Blue, How Beautiful (2015). It was written by Florence Welch and Isabella Summers, and produced by Markus Dravs. The song was released on 27 November 2015 as the album's fourth and final single.

== Critical reception ==
Jon Blistein of Rolling Stone wrote that "Delilah" begins sparsely with Welch's multi-tracked call-and-response vocals sailing atop a simple piano and simmering synths.

== Music video ==
The music video for "Delilah" was directed by Vincent Haycock and premiered on 21 October 2015 as part of the video series The Odyssey. Filmed in Los Angeles, the video opens with an intense monologue from an old man. Florence Welch is then seen roaming through a "maze of motel rooms – dancing, writhing intensely, cutting a man's hair and encountering a horrifying goblin." At the end of the video, Welch "triumphantly rides through the streets of Los Angeles [...] as a hat tip to her newfound freedom."

In an interview with Rookie, Haycock said of the video, "The cutting of the hair was a direct reference to the biblical [story of] Delilah, but then it veered off into something more personal to Florence. Since this song was always planned as being the end of the series, we decided to make it about [her] returning to her true self, killing off the ego version of herself, and finding her way home again."

== Track listings ==
- Digital download – Galantis Remix
1. "Delilah" (Galantis Remix) – 5:37
2. "Delilah" (Galantis Remix / Radio Edit) – 4:11
- Limited-edition 12-inch single (Record Store Day exclusive)

A1. "Delilah" – 4:53
A2. "Delilah" (Demo) – 4:23
B. "Only Love Can Break Your Heart" (live) – 2:58

== Credits and personnel ==
Credits adapted from the liner notes of How Big, How Blue, How Beautiful.

=== Recording ===
- Engineered at The Pool (London)
- Mixed at Toast Studios (London)
- Mastered at Sterling Sound (New York City)

=== Personnel ===
Florence and the Machine

- Florence Welch – vocals, backing vocals
- Chris Hayden – drums, percussion
- Mark Saunders – bass

Additional personnel

- Markus Dravs – production
- Robin Baynton – engineering, organ, piano
- Jonathan Sagis – engineering assistance
- Iain Berryman – engineering assistance
- Leo Abrahams – electric guitar
- Pete Prokopiw – programming
- Craig Silvey – mixing
- Eduardo de la Paz – mixing assistance
- Ted Jensen – mastering

== Charts ==
=== Weekly charts ===
Weekly chart performance for "Delilah"
Chart (2015–2016)	Peak position
Australia (ARIA)	41
Belgium (Ultratop 50 Flanders)	31
France (SNEP)	89
Scotland Singles (OCC)	53
UK Singles (OCC)	102
US Hot Rock & Alternative Songs (Billboard)	15
US Rock & Alternative Airplay (Billboard)	38

=== Year-end charts ===
Year-end chart performance for "Delilah"
Chart (2016)	Position
Iceland (Plötutíóindi)	45

== Certifications ==
Certifications for "Delilah"
Region	Certification	Certified units/sales
Brazil (Pro-Música Brasil)	Gold	30,000^{‡}
United Kingdom (BPI)	Silver	200,000^{‡}
^{‡} Sales+streaming figures based on certification alone.

== Release history ==
Release dates and formats for "Delilah"
Region	Date	Format	Label	Ref(s)
Various	27 November 2015	Digital download – Galantis Remix	Island	
United States	19 January 2016	Alternative radio	Republic	
United States	16 April 2016	12-inch single (Note: Limited-edition release for Record Store Day)	Republic	
