= Sympathy Magic =

Single by Florence and the Machine

from the album Everybody Scream
- Released: October 27, 2025
- Studio: Electric Lady Studio
- Genre: Art rock; orchestral rock; baroque pop
- Length: 4:28
- Label: Polydor
- Songwriters: Florence Welch; Danny L Harle
- Producers: Florence Welch; Aaron Dessner; Danny L Harle

Florence and the Machine singles chronology
"One of the Greats" (2025)	"Sympathy Magic" (2025)	"Buckle" (2025)

Music video
- "Sympathy Magic" on YouTube

"Sympathy Magic" is a song by indie rock band Florence and the Machine as the third single to their sixth studio album, Everybody Scream. Released on 27 October 2025 by Polydor Records, the song was written by Florence Welch and Danny L Harle, and produced by the two alone with Aaron Dessner. Following "One of the Greats", the track served as the third single and fourth track on the album. "Sympathy Magic" is a sweeping cinematic orchestral accompanied baroque pop and art rock song describing the aftermath of trauma Welch experienced with her near-fatal experience with an ectopic pregnancy and her healing process following

== Background ==
During the band's Dance Fever Tour through 2022–23, frontwoman of the band Florence Welch underwent life-saving surgery for an ectopic pregnancy. Welch described the experience and healing afterwards as a spiritual taking that shaped the future album's themes and soundscape. The band announced "Sympathy Magic" was to be released on 27 October 2025. A music video was released with the single, directed by Autumn de Wilde, who has collaborated with the band with many of its previous music videos, including the album's two previous singles.

== Lyrics and composition ==
Everybody Scream's albums themes and references to folk horror, mysticism, witchcraft and most importantly cathartic screaming, all of which are reflected in "Sympathy Magic". The first verse of the song references Welch's near-death experience, describing the trauma from the event, but also the healing in both physical and spiritual forms. The line "So I don't have to be worthy / I no longer try to be good" describes the years of trying to feel a part of the music industry, the years it has taken her to arrive where she is, and her abandonment of her worries and fears she is not good enough to be worthy of such a foothold in the music industry.

== Live performances ==
"Sympathy Magic" debuted on The Tonight Show Starring Jimmy Fallon on October 26, a day before the songs official release. It was performed several times further on small promotional concerts and late-night shows, such as "Later With Jools Holland". It was also performed at an intimate concert in The Loft radio station in Los Angeles on October 27, along with other Everybody Scream singles; "Everybody Scream" and "One of the Greats". The song was later included in the setlist for the Everybody Scream Tour as the main set closer before the encore.

== Music video ==
The music video for "Sympathy Magic" was directed by Autumn de Wilde who has worked with the band on many of its videos, including "Free", "Everybody Scream" and "One of the Greats". It depicts Welch and four women on a windswept hill, making up the "witch choir" used in the tour, filmed in Yorkshire.

== Charts ==
Chart performance for "Sympathy Magic"
Chart (2025)	Peak position
Official Charts Company	46
UK Singles	62
Ireland Singles Top 100	68
