= One of the Greats =

Song by Florence and the Machine

Single by Florence and the Machine

from the album Everybody Scream
- Released: 24 September 2025
- Genre: Alternative rock
- Length: 6:32
- Label: Polydor
- Songwriters: Florence Welch; Mark Bowen
- Producers: Aaron Dessner; Florence Welch; Mark Bowen

Florence and the Machine singles chronology
"Everybody Scream" (2025)	"One of the Greats" (2025)	"Sympathy Magic" (2025)

Visualiser
- "One of the Greats" on YouTube

"One of the Greats" is a song by the English indie rock band Florence and the Machine from their sixth studio album, Everybody Scream (2025). The track was written by the band's frontwoman, Florence Welch, alongside the Idles guitarist Mark Bowen; they produced it with Aaron Dessner. A six-minute alternative rock song, "One of the Greats" uses a resurrection metaphor to depict Welch's return to music and employs self-deprecating humour. It explores her ephemerality and legacy as a musician, as well as sexism within the music industry.

Originally a poem written during the Dance Fever Tour (2022–2023), the song was inspired by the supernatural horror television series Buffy the Vampire Slayer (1997–2003) and Welch's expectation that she would feel satisfied after finishing her records. Polydor Records released it as Everybody Scream's second single on 24 September 2025. "One of the Greats" received positive reviews from critics, who praised its lyrics and humour. It was listed among the best songs of 2025 by multiple journalists. Florence and the Machine included the song on the setlist of their 2026 tour, the Everybody Scream Tour, as the encore opener.

== Background ==
In 2009, the English indie rock band Florence and the Machine released their first studio album, Lungs, to critical and commercial success. However, according to their frontwoman, Florence Welch, their flamboyance and expressiveness were considered "inauthentic and attention-seeking", causing her to become more withdrawn offstage. The band have since embarked on several tours in support of various albums. During breaks in the Dance Fever Tour (2022–2023), Welch began writing Florence and the Machine's sixth studio album, Everybody Scream (2025), with Mark Bowen, the guitarist of the post-punk band Idles. In 2023, while on tour, Welch underwent life-saving surgery due to an ectopic pregnancy and ruptured fallopian tube. She said that the experience felt as though "it was just full of women, screaming". Resultantly, she wanted to explore "brutal" sounds and themes of mysticism. Welch also stated that she was furious "at how unsupported I felt by my industry, how clear it was, that it wasn't built for me".

== Writing and recording ==
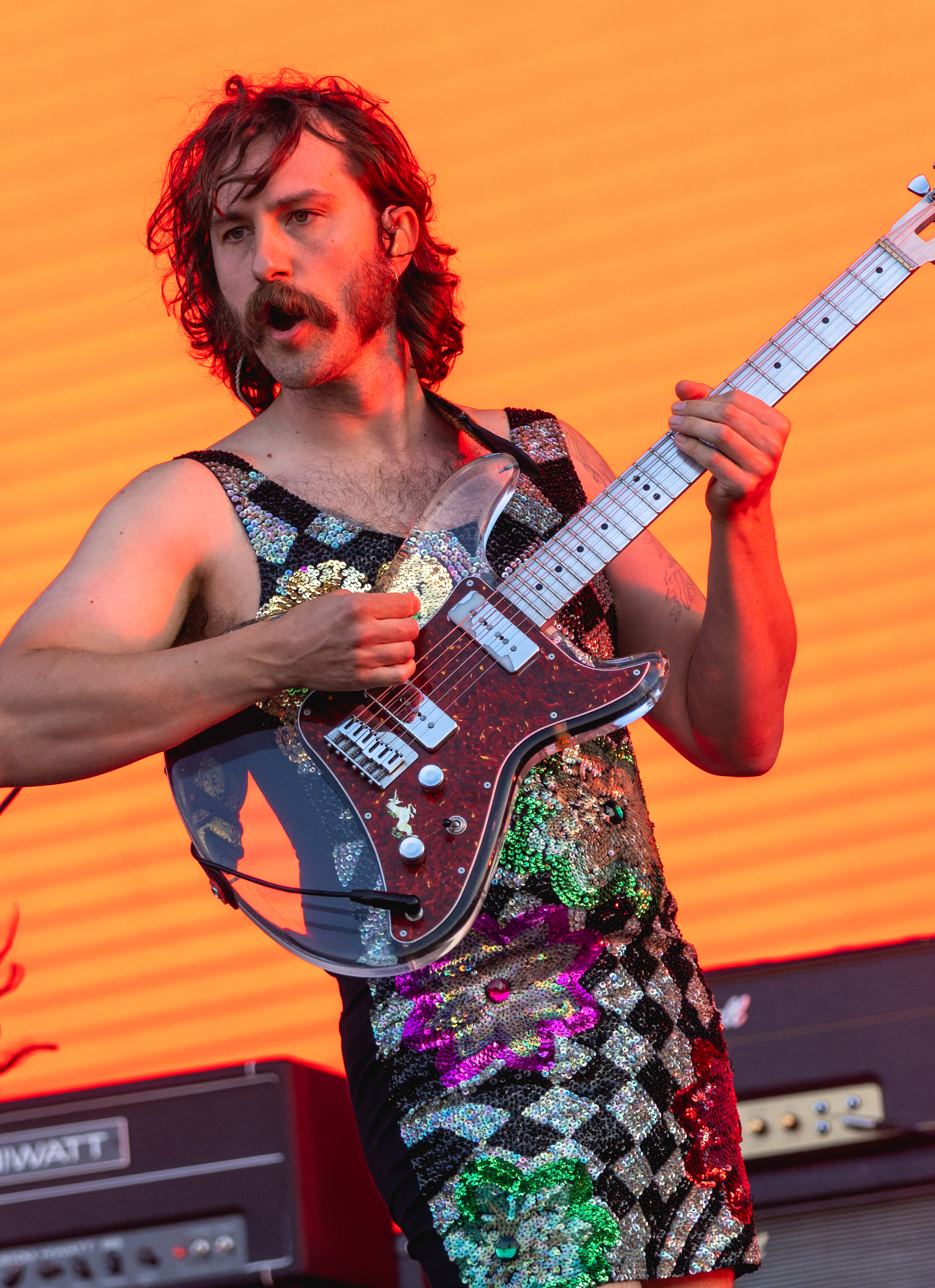
The Idles guitarist Mark Bowen (pictured in 2025) co-wrote "One of the Greats".

Welch and Bowen wrote "One of the Greats" over the course of three years. Welch began writing it during the Dance Fever Tour while re-watching the supernatural horror television series Buffy the Vampire Slayer (1997–2003). She reflected on how she rarely achieved the expected satisfaction after finishing her records. The song started as a poem about greatness, exploring its cost, its brutality, the reasons she desired it and her lack of satisfaction. She took inspiration from Buffy's sixth season, in which the titular character is resurrected and is unhappy on Earth due to having been in heaven; Welch wanted to write something where a narrator responded, "What the fuck is this?" to their resurrection, like Buffy. She said that "One of the Greats" eventually became a "15-year outpouring of frustration" at the early criticism of her expressiveness. Its chorus was based on a horror film–like visual she had in her mind of a ghost walking down the street. She also included several lyrics that she found humorous.

Welch and Bowen recorded "One of the Greats" in one take, during which she sang the song "straight from the page" and he played the guitar. According to Welch, that recording "just happened" after Bowen began playing a guitar riff. They intended to re-record it, but they opted not to due to the first version's "amazing energy". The two produced the track with Aaron Dessner. Welch, who wanted listeners to feel as though they "were disintegrating into nothing at the end", described production as "an absolute nightmare" due to the song's changing time signatures and unorthodox tuning. They tried to fit the song into a fixed tempo and rhythmic units, but they found that the adjustments took away some of its character. Dessner and the engineer Bella Blasko spent days making minor adjustments to the timing of the drums.

== Lyrics and composition ==
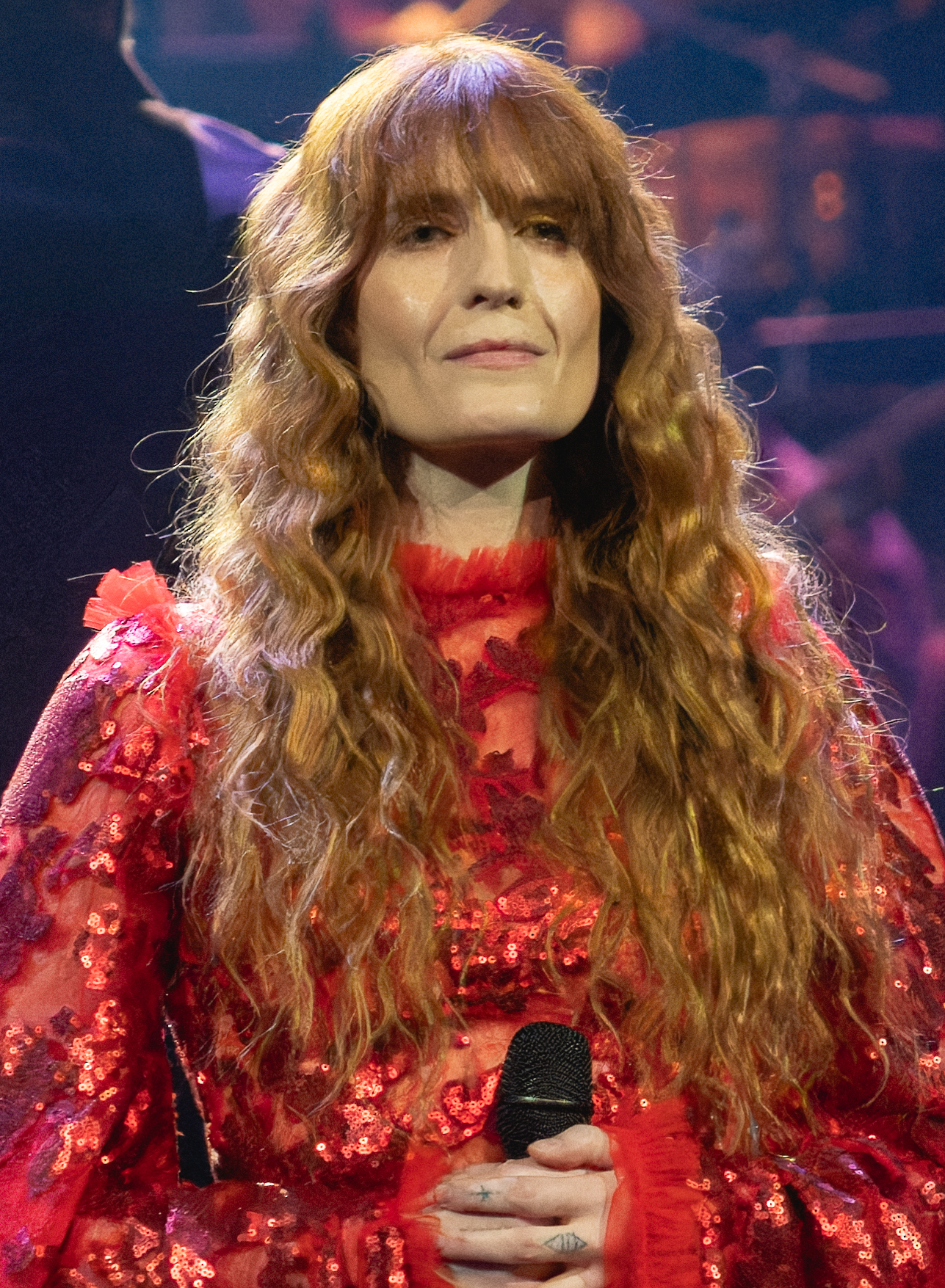
According to Florence Welch (pictured in 2024), themes discussed in "One of the Greats" include greatness, artistry, sacrifice and femininity.

Welch has stated that "One of the Greats" discusses various themes, including greatness, the "violence" of artistry, sacrifice and femininity. She referred to it as a representation of "this feeling" that her music would never be considered "good enough" for audiences; she wondered if critics did not take her music seriously due to its perceived lack of reservedness, enigma and masculinity. However, when listening to songs that supposedly epitomised such qualities, Welch felt bored and became envious of men's successes. In an interview with The Guardian, she asserted that male musicians are praised for simply "be[ing] hot in a T-shirt", whereas women must focus on their body and clothes.

The lyrics of "One of the Greats" explore Welch's ephemerality and legacy as a musician. She metaphorises her return to releasing music as a revival from the dead; the song begins with imagery of Welch crawling out of her grave. Throughout the song, Welch documents various grievances; she attempts and subsequently rejects toxic positivity and mentions her burnout at age 36. The second-verse lyric "Got everything I thought I wanted and cried hungover in a hotel closet" references Welch's reaction to the band's Brit Award win for British Album of the Year in 2010, during which she felt overwhelmed and pressured. Welch asserts her greatness while satirising the concept, singing, "I've really done it this time / I'll be up there with the men and the 10 other women / In the 100 greatest records of all time" in the bridge.

"One of the Greats" also explores sexism within the music industry. The DIY writer Daisy Carter referred to the song as "a quietly furious, acerbic rumination on her safety glass ceiling". Welch discusses the criticism she received at the beginning of her career, blaming it on sexism. In the bridge, she focusses on gender politics. She laments gendered double standards ("It must be nice to be a man and make boring music just because you can") and examines the differences between how men and women approach power ("It's funny how men don't find power very sexy / So this one's for the ladies"). Near the end of the song, Welch addresses her creative insecurities, the personal cost of her career and male entitlement. Critics considered "One of the Greats" a thematic companion to another Everybody Scream song, "Music by Men", which discusses Welch's position as a female musician.

"One of the Greats"
A sample of the bridge of "One of the Greats", showing Welch's rhythm lagging behind the beat and the mounting tension

With a length of 6 minutes and 32 seconds, "One of the Greats" is an alternative rock song. According to Welch, it sounds "out of tune" and "technically incredibly ugly", reflecting its themes. The song opens with guitars played by Bowen, which The Guardian's Alexis Petridis thought resembled music by the American rock band the Velvet Underground. The song also incorporates trilling strings, choirs, electronic riffs and backing vocals by the American singer-songwriter Ethel Cain. During a couplet in the bridge, Welch's rhythm lags behind the song's beat for emphasis. The tension breaks during the final chorus, which incorporates a harp arrangement by Tom "Moth" Monger alongside louder drums and guitar. Several elements of the song, including Welch's vocals, have been compared to the music of the American singer and songwriter Patti Smith. (Note: Attributed to articles in DIY, The Independent, the Irish Independent and MusicOMH) Critics have referred to Welch's vocal delivery in various lines as gnarling, scoffing, spitting and sneering.

== Release and live performances ==
On 17 September 2025, Welch posted a teaser for "One of the Greats". Polydor Records released the song on 24 September as the second single from Everybody Scream. A music video was released alongside the song. It depicts Welch singing in the back of a limousine with a cigar while dressed in a black suit, white shirt and sunglasses. According to The New Yorker, the video shows Welch simultaneously assuming the role of and satirising male dominance.

In October 2025, Florence and the Machine performed "One of the Greats" live at off-Broadway's Cherry Lane Theatre. In November, they played it at the Loft for SiriusXM and Electric Lady Studios for World Cafe. The song was included on the setlist of their 2026 tour, the Everybody Scream Tour, as the encore opener. After the lights turned off at the end of the main set, Welch re-entered from the opposite side of the stage to perform the song. The performance was backed by an electric guitar and had a faster pace than the studio version. Florence and the Machine also performed the song at their 2026 festival appearances and the Mercury Prize ceremony. At the tour's opening night in Belfast, the shows in London and New York City and the Reading Festival, Bowen joined the band to play the guitar.

== Reception ==
"One of the Greats" has received praise from critics, who found it "biting [and] unflinching", "astonishing" and "transcendent". Under the Radar named it one of the best songs to be released during the 34th week of 2025, and a MusicOMH review of Everybody Scream considered the track an instant standout. Jaeden Pinder of Pitchfork, who found the song "[v]ivid and free-associative", deemed it the album's greatest success, crediting its vulnerability and ambition with realising the intended catharsis. Similarly, The New Yorker writer Grace Byron suggested that "One of the Greats" could be one of Welch's finest songs over the past several years and commended its "glorious slow burn" style. Reviews in The Independent and Paste remarked on the fury expressed; the latter compared the song to a "raw stream-of-consciousness rant".

Multiple reviewers were responsive to the lyrics, with Consequence's Scott Sterling describing them as "brilliantly scathing". Magazines singled out the line "It must be nice to be a man and make boring music just because you can"; MusicOMH said it was "one of the sweetest kiss-offs" of 2025. The Guardian praised the comedic remarks used to respond to critics as especially successful. David James Young, writing in The Australian, disagreed, arguing that the "conflicted" lyrics ruined the song. Additionally, Sterling complimented Welch's vocals as "evocative".

"One of the Greats" has been included in lists of the best songs of 2025. Rolling Stone, Billboard and NME ranked it at numbers 53, 30 and 15 respectively; Rolling Stone also said that the song's lyrics were "killer", and NME lauded its wit and swagger.

== Personnel ==
Credits are adapted from Tidal.

- Florence Welch – vocals, songwriting, production, background vocals, shaker, tambourine
- Aaron Dessner – production, electric guitar
- Mark Bowen – songwriting, production, additional engineering, bass, guitar, organ, sound effects, synthesisers
- Benjamin Lanz – additional engineering, synthesisers, tambourine
- Hayden Anhedönia – background vocals
- Steve Pearce – bass
- Laura Moody – cello
- Ian Thomas – drums
- Jon Beavis – drums
- Leo Abrahams – electric guitar
- Bella Blasko – engineering, mixing
- Billy Halliday – engineering
- Tom "Moth" Monger – harp
- Randy Merrill – mastering
- Chris Vatalaro – piano
- Elysian Collective – strings
- Richard Jones – viola
- Emma Smith – violin
- Jennymay Logan – violin

== Charts ==
Chart performance for "One of the Greats"
Chart (2025)	Peak position
US Hot Rock & Alternative Songs (Billboard)	44
