= Everybody Scream Tour =

2026 concert tour by Florence and the Machine

- Tour by Florence and the Machine
- Location: Europe; North America
- Associated album: Everybody Scream
- Start date: 6 February 2026
- End date: 30 August 2026
- No. of shows: 48
- Supporting acts: Paris Paloma; Dionne; Rachel Chinouriri; Sofia Isella; CMAT; Mannequin Pussy; Jacob Alon; Self Esteem

Florence and the Machine concert chronology
- Dance Fever Tour (2022–2023); Everybody Scream Tour (2026)

The Everybody Scream Tour was a concert tour by English band Florence and the Machine, staged in support of their sixth studio album, Everybody Scream (2025). Set to visit Europe and North America, it began on 6 February 2026 in Belfast, Northern Ireland, and concluded on 30 August 2026 in Reading, England. The show features songs from Everybody Scream and the band's previous albums exploring themes of grief, hope, and folklore. The band is supported by an ensemble staging folk-horror-inspired performances. The tour received positive reviews praising lead singer Florence Welch's performance and voice.

== Background ==
"The closest I came to making life was the closest I came to death [..] And I felt like I had stepped through this door, and it was just full of women, screaming."

— Welch in an interview with The Guardian

English band Florence and the Machine announced in August 2025 that they would released their sixth studio album, Everybody Scream, on 31 October 2025 and tour several countries in Europe to promote it, with Paris Paloma as the main supporting act and Dionne joining as the opening act for four dates in the United Kingdom.. The band's lead singer and songwriter, Florence Welch, conceived the album after suffering a miscarriage caused by an ectopic pregnancy while touring in 2023. Welch visited a folk healer and began researching the history of witchcraft and its connection to midwifery. She commented, "Modern medicine absolutely saved my life, but you can't go anywhere about birth without finding witchcraft and magic and medicine." Everybody Scream's themes and inspirations include mysticism, folk horror, womanhood, partnership, ageing, and dying. On the record, Welch also deals with "the limits of her body", the meaning of being "healed", and her struggles and sacrifices as a woman in the music industry.

Tickets for the tour went on sale to the general public on 5 September 2025, while presale tickets became available on 3 September 2025. In October 2025, the band announced the dates for the North American leg and a second European leg of the tour, with the latter primarily taking place at outdoor music festivals in the summer of 2026. Rachel Chinouriri, Sofia Isella, CMAT, and Mannequin Pussy will alternate as the opening acts for the North American leg, while Chinouriri, Jacob Alon, and Self Esteem are set to be the supporting acts for the summer dates in Ireland and Scotland. The tickets for the North American leg went on sale to the general public on 5 November 2025, while presale tickets became available on 3 November 2025.

== Synopsis ==
The stage is initially draped in a curtain illustrated with medicinal herbs and illuminated by an orange light. A shifting spotlight shows the shadow of a woman "maybe being mauled", which The Times's Lisa Verrico compared to the shower scene from the horror film Psycho (1960). When the curtain is raised, Welch appears wearing a floor-length gothic lace gown with a ruffled skirt and draped sleeves. She performs barefoot center stage while the band stays in the shadows. The set list includes mostly songs from Everybody Scream and some songs from the band's previous albums with similar themes related to grief, hope, and folklore. The accompaniment shifts from a full band to "sometimes just drums and [...] synths, occasionally only acoustic guitar and [...] harp". Welch often dances and runs on stage throughout the concert, accompanied by a performance group, named the Witch Choir, made up of four women. The Witch Choir wear cloaks, petticoats, and heavy boots. They act both as backup dancers and singers depending on the song. The folk-horror-inspired dance performances were choreographed by Ryan Heffington. The Independent's Blue Kirkhope compared the Witch Choir "twitch[ing], snap[ping], and fold[ing] into positions" to scenes from the folk horror film Suspiria (1977).

== Reception ==
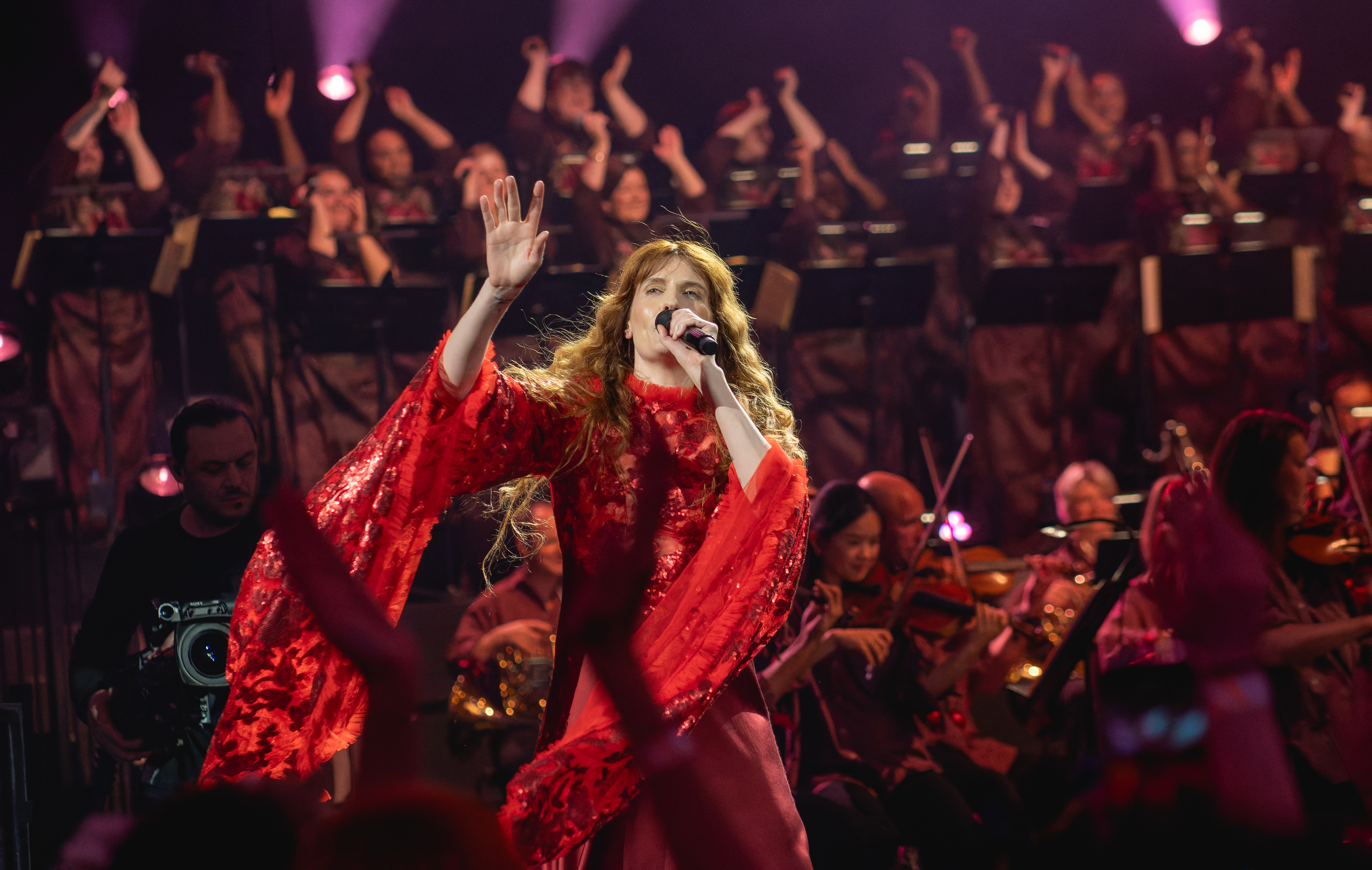
Welch (pictured) received praise for her performance.

Ahead of the start of the Everybody Scream Tour, Pitchfork named it one of the most anticipated tours of 2026, describing the band's live performances as "a place for emotional liberation and musical catharsis" featuring "collective scream-alongs, hopeful manifestations, and a resounding belief that good will trump evil".

Journalists' responses to the concert and Welch's performance in Glasgow were positive. Kirkhope praised Welch's "gale-force" and "enchanting" voice and gave the show five out of five stars, describing it as "less a concert than a communal ceremony" with "Welch and the audience bound together in a shared act of catharsis". Verrico said that "Florence and the Machine [had] never been less than spectacular live" and described Welch as "more relaxed" compared to the band's previous tours, remarking that "Everybody Scream [...] suggested that the singer [had] finally got to grips with fame". The Guardian's Katie Hawthorne praised Welch's commanding performance and "transfixing" voice and gave the "high-drama" concert four out of five stars, but remarked that it "threaten[ed] to overwhelm" with the Witch Choir's intense performance.

== Set list ==
Arena Shows Setlist

1. "Everybody Scream"
2. "Witch Dance"
3. "Shake It Out"
4. "Seven Devils
5. "Big God"
6. "Daffodil"
7. "Which Witch"
8. "Cosmic Love"
9. "Spectrum"
10. "You Can Have It All"
11. "Music By Men"
12. "Buckle"
13. "King"
14. "The Old Religion"
15. "Howl"
16. "Heaven Is Here"
17. "Sympathy Magic"

Encore

18. "One of the Greats"
19. "Dog Days Are Over"
20. "Free"
21. "And Love"

Festival Setlist

1. "Everybody Scream"
2. "Shake It Out"
3. "Which Witch"
4. "Spectrum"
5. "Rabbit Heart (Raise It Up)"
6. "You've Got The Love"
7. "Hunger"
8. "King"
9. "Howl"
10. "What Kind Of Man"
11. "Heaven Is Here"
12. "One of the Greats"
13. "Buckle"
14. "Never Let Me Go"
15. "Sympathy Magic"
16. "Dog Days Are Over"
17. "Free"

=== Notes ===
- At the concert in Belfast, Florence and the Machine played "Happy Birthday to You" for a fan in the audience
- At the opening night in Belfast, the two London shows and the shows in New York City, the band performed "One of the Greats" with Mark Bowen.
- At the concerts in Birmingham, Newcastle, Sheffield and the concerts following Manchester on the first European Leg "Never Let Me Go" replaced "You Can Have It All"
- At the concerts following the Paris show on the first European Leg, “Hunger" replaced "Music by Men".
- At the concert in Berlin, Florence joined Paris Paloma, the opening act, onstage during her set to play "Labour"
- At the shows in Detroit, Montreal, Boston, Atlanta, Portland and San Francisco "Perfume and Milk" replaced "Music By Men"
- At the shows in Atlantic City, Tampa, Miami, Atlanta, Nashville, Austin and Seattle, "Kraken" was played after "Howl"
- At the shows in Atlantic City, Tampa and Miami, "The Old Religion" was not played
- At the shows in Atlantic City, Tampa, Miami, Atlanta, Houston, Fort Worth, Glendale, Seattle, Portland and San Francisco, "Never Let Me Go" replaced "You Can Have It All"
- At the shows in Houston, Fort Worth, Glendale and Seattle, "Music By Men" was not played
- At the shows in Leeds and Reading, "Hunger", "King" and "Never Let Me Go" were not played

== Tour dates ==
List of 2026 concerts, showing date, city, country, venue and opening acts
Date	City	Country	Venue	Opening act(s)
6 February	Belfast	Northern Ireland	SSE Arena	Paris Paloma
8 February	Birmingham	England	bp pulse LIVE	Paris Paloma
9 February	Glasgow	Scotland	OVO Hydro	Paris Paloma
11 February	Newcastle	England	Utilita Arena Newcastle	Paris Paloma
13 February	Liverpool	England	M&S Bank Arena	Dionne; Paris Paloma
14 February	Sheffield	England	Utilita Arena Sheffield	Dionne; Paris Paloma
16 February	London	England	The O2 Arena	Paris Paloma
17 February	London	England	The O2 Arena	Dionne; Paris Paloma
20 February	Manchester	England	Co-op Live	Dionne; Paris Paloma
22 February	Paris	France	Accor Arena	Paris Paloma
23 February	Antwerp	Belgium	AFAS Dome	Paris Paloma
25 February	Amsterdam	Netherlands	Ziggo Dome	Paris Paloma
26 February	Cologne	Germany	Lanxess Arena	Paris Paloma
2 March	Vienna	Austria	Wiener Stadthalle	Paris Paloma
4 March	Munich	Germany	Olympiahalle	Paris Paloma
5 March	Prague	Czech Republic	The O2 Prague	Paris Paloma
7 March	Kraków	Poland	Tauron Arena	Paris Paloma
9 March	Berlin	Germany	Uber Arena	Paris Paloma
8 April	Minneapolis	United States	Target Center	Rachel Chinouriri
10 April	Rosemont	United States	Allstate Arena	Rachel Chinouriri
11 April	Rosemont	United States	Allstate Arena	Rachel Chinouriri
13 April	Detroit	United States	Little Caesars Arena	Rachel Chinouriri
15 April	Montreal	Canada	Bell Centre	Rachel Chinouriri
16 April	Toronto	Canada	Scotiabank Arena	Rachel Chinouriri
18 April	Washington, D.C.	United States	Capital One Arena	Sofia Isella
20 April	Boston	United States	TD Garden	Sofia Isella
21 April	New York City	United States	Madison Square Garden	Sofia Isella
22 April	New York City	United States	Madison Square Garden	Sofia Isella
24 April	Brooklyn	United States	Barclays Center	Sofia Isella
25 April	Atlantic City	United States	Boardwalk Hall (Note: Moved from Xfinity Mobile Arena in Philadelphia as a result of a playoff scheduling conflict with the Philadelphia Flyers.)	Sofia Isella
28 April	Tampa	United States	Benchmark International Arena	CMAT
29 April	Miami	United States	Kaseya Center	CMAT
1 May	Atlanta	United States	State Farm Arena	CMAT
2 May	Nashville	United States	Bridgestone Arena	CMAT
4 May	Austin	United States	Moody Center	CMAT
5 May	Houston	United States	Toyota Center	CMAT
7 May	Fort Worth	United States	Dickies Arena	CMAT
9 May	Glendale	United States	Desert Diamond Arena	Mannequin Pussy
12 May	Seattle	United States	Climate Pledge Arena	Mannequin Pussy
13 May	Portland	United States	Moda Center	Mannequin Pussy
15 May	San Francisco	United States	Chase Center	Mannequin Pussy
19 May	Inglewood	United States	Kia Forum	Mannequin Pussy
20 May	Inglewood	United States	Kia Forum	Mannequin Pussy
27 June	Limerick	Ireland	Thomond Park	Rachel Chinouriri
28 June	Dublin	Ireland	Marlay Park	Rachel Chinouriri
24 August (Note: As part of the music festival Edinburgh Summer Sessions.)	Edinburgh	Scotland	Royal Highland Centre	Jacob Alon; Self Esteem
28 August (Note: Reading & Leeds festival.)	Leeds	England	Bramham Park	—N/a
30 August (Note: Reading & Leeds festival.)	Reading	England	Richfield Avenue	—N/a
