= Sofia Isella =

American singer-songwriter (born 2005)

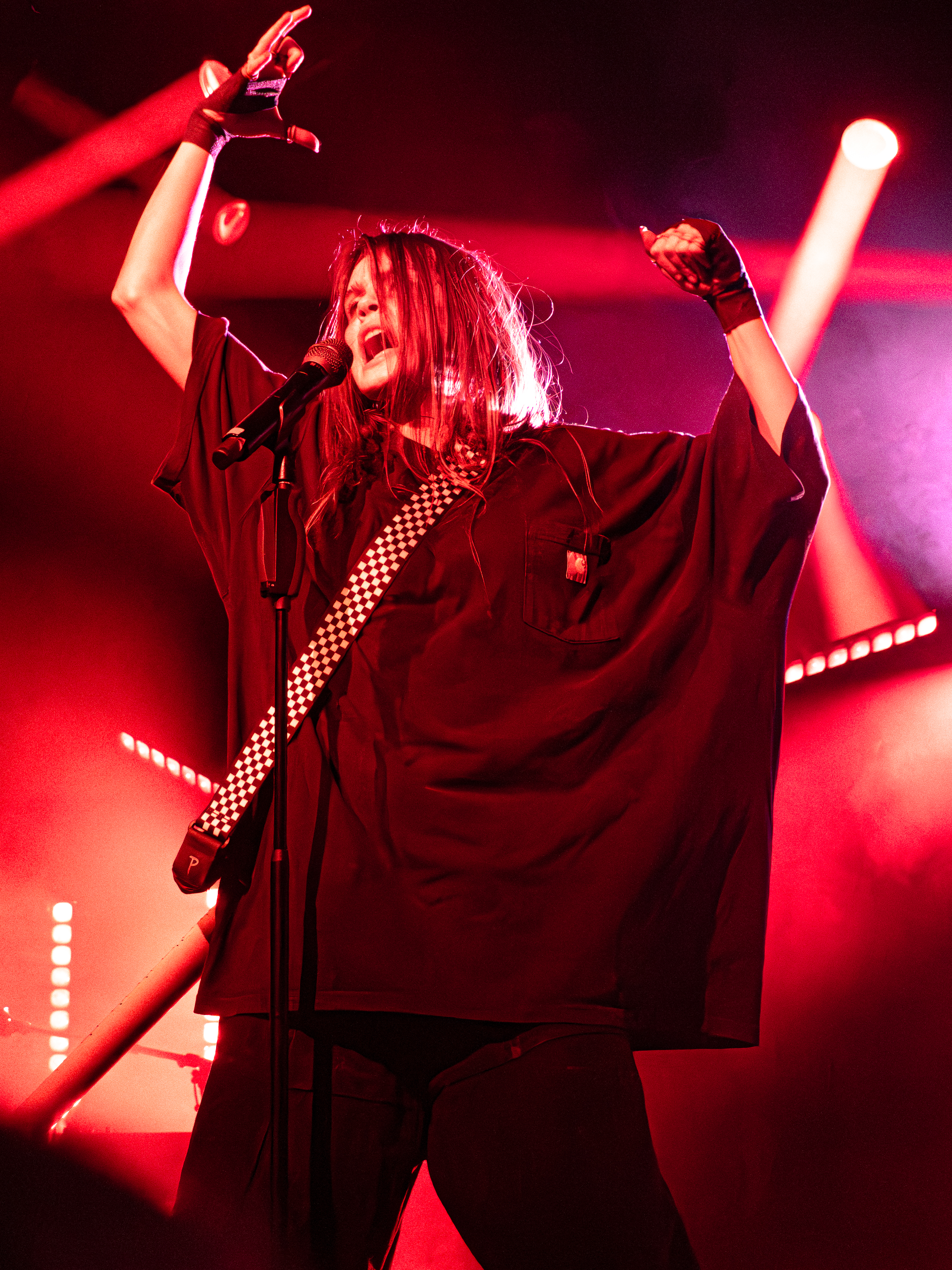
- Isella performing in Zurich in May 2026
- Born: Sofia Isella Miranda; January 29, 2005 (age 21); Los Angeles, California, U.S.
- Occupations: Singer-songwriter; musician; producer
- Years active: 2020–present
- Parents: Claudio Miranda (father); Kelli Bean (mother)
- Musical career
- Genres: Alternative pop; art rock; dark pop; art pop; industrial
- Instruments: Vocals; violin; piano; guitar; banjo; ukelele
- Website: sofiaisella.com

Sofia Isella Miranda (born January 29, 2005) is an American singer-songwriter, musician, and producer. She has written four EPs, releasing the first in 2020 and the next two in 2024 and 2025, with the most recent released on April 17, 2026. After gaining popularity on TikTok, she has performed as the opening act for artists such as Melanie Martinez, Tom Odell, Taylor Swift, Florence and the Machine, and Glass Animals since 2023. In 2025, she extensively toured as a headliner in the United States, Europe, and Australia. Isella's music combines alternative pop, art rock, dark pop, art pop, industrial, gothic pop, and spoken word. Lyrically, her work frequently focuses on womanhood, misogyny, religion, and porn.

== Early life ==
Sofia Isella Miranda was born in Los Angeles, California, on January 29, 2005, to Chilean-American filmmaker Claudio Miranda and writer and memoirist Kelli Bean. She began playing the violin when she was a child, and she wrote her first song lyrics at age eight. She received education at the Colburn School and through homeschooling. Isella's family moved frequently throughout her childhood, living in Taiwan, Canada, Louisiana, and New Mexico. They settled in Burleigh Heads, Australia, in 2020 and returned to Los Angeles by mid-2024.

== Career ==
Isella's first extended play, I'm Not Yours, was released in 2020 and primarily consisted of songs she had written when she was 14 and 15. She performed several concerts after moving to Australia, including a set at the Caloundra Music Festival. After gaining popularity on TikTok, Isella was a concert opener for Melanie Martinez and Tom Odell in late 2023 and early 2024. In May and June 2024, she opened for Martinez's Trilogy Tour. Two months later, she was an opening act on Taylor Swift's Eras Tour. Her 2023 single, "Hot Gum", gained 10 million streams.

Isella released her second EP, I Can Be Your Mother, on September 6, 2024. She toured California later that month and began her first world tour, You'll Understand, Dick, in April 2025. It included the second US leg, You'll Understand More, Dick, one trip to Europe and one to Australia, and ended in Sydney, Australia on December 12, 2025. Her third EP, I'm camera ., was released on May 23, 2025. Her fourth EP, Something is a shell ., produced with Mr Hudson, was released on April 17, 2026. Her second world tour, called, Her Desire, the Nemesis, began May 5, 2026 in Brussels, Belgium.

== Artistry and influences ==
Isella's musical style has been described as alternative pop, art rock, dark pop, art pop, industrial, gothic pop, and indie pop, with elements of post-punk, spoken word, and classical music. Her songs frequently focus on womanhood, misogyny, religion, and porn. She has named Trent Reznor, Beck, Taylor Swift, Sylvia Plath, Margaret Atwood, Mona Awad, and Anne Sexton as major influences. She has been compared to Billie Eilish, Ethel Cain, and Halsey.

Isella often performs in baggy, uncolored clothes and covers herself with dirt and muck. Her album art features macabre imagery, and her music videos are reminiscent of horror movies. Her social media posts are all black, white, and sepia.

== Discography ==
=== Extended plays ===
Title	Details
I'm Not Yours	Released: November 6, 2020; Label: Self-released; Format: Digital download, streaming
I Can Be Your Mother	Released: September 6, 2024; Label: Self-released; Format: LP (with bonus tracks on side B), digital download, streaming
I'm camera .	Released: May 23, 2025; Label: Self-released; Format: LP, digital download, streaming
Something is a shell .	Released: April 17, 2026; Label: Self-released; Format: CD, LP, digital download, streaming

=== Singles ===
Title	Year	Album/EP
"Rainbow Rocket Ride"	2022	Non-album singles
"All of Human Knowledge Made Us Dumb"	2022	Non-album singles
"Us and Pigs"	2023	Non-album singles
"I Looked the Future in the Eyes, It's Mine"	2023	Non-album singles
"Hot Gum"	2023	Non-album singles
"Everybody Supports Women"	2023	Non-album singles
"Hot Gum (she version)"	2024	Non-album singles
"Cacao and Cocaine"	2024	I Can Be Your Mother
"Unattractive"	2024	I Can Be Your Mother
"Sex Concept"	2024	I Can Be Your Mother
"The Doll People"	2024	I Can Be Your Mother
"I Can Be Your Mother"	2024	I Can Be Your Mother
"The Well"	2024	I Can Be Your Mother
"Dog's Dinner"	2025	I'm camera .
"Josephine"	2025	I'm camera .
"Crowd Caffeine"	2025	I'm camera .
"Orchestrated, Wet, Verboten"	2025	I'm camera .
"Muse"	2025	I'm camera .
"Man Made"	2025	I'm camera .
"Out in the Garden"	2025	Something is a shell .
"Above the Neck"	2025	Something is a shell .
"Numbers 31:17–18"	2026	Something is a shell .
"The Chicken is Naked and Afraid"	2026	Something is a shell .

== Tours ==
=== Headlining ===
- You'll Understand, Dick (2025)
- You'll Understand More, Dick (2025)
- Her Desire, the Nemesis (2026–2027)

=== Supporting ===
- Melanie Martinez – Portals Tour (2023)
- Tom Odell – Black Friday Tour (2023–2024)
- Melanie Martinez — The Trilogy Tour (2024)
- Taylor Swift – The Eras Tour (2024)
- Glass Animals – Tour of Earth (2025)
- Florence and the Machine – Everybody Scream Tour (2026)
