= Everybody Scream =

Studio album by Florence and the Machine
- Released: 31 October 2025
- Genres: Baroque pop; gothic rock; alternative rock; folk rock; art rock; indie rock
- Length: 49:39
- Label: Polydor
- Producers: Dave Bayley; Mark Bowen; Aaron Dessner; James Ford; Danny L Harle; Florence Welch

Florence and the Machine chronology
Symphony of Lungs (BBC Proms at the Royal Albert Hall) (2024)	Everybody Scream (2025)	Everybody Scream Tour Live (2026)

Singles from Everybody Scream
- 1. "Everybody Scream" Released: 20 August 2025; 2. "One of the Greats" Released: 24 September 2025; 3. "Sympathy Magic" Released: 27 October 2025; 4. "Buckle" Released: 4 November 2025

Everybody Scream is the sixth studio album by English indie rock band Florence and the Machine, released on 31 October 2025 through Polydor and Republic Records. It is their first album in three years, following their 2022 album Dance Fever.

== Background and promotion ==
On 3 July 2025, the band began hinting at a new record when singer Florence Welch shared a carousel of images on her Instagram. The images showed Welch working with Idles guitarist Mark Bowen, and included mentions of themes, such as "witchcraft, folk horror, mysticism, magic, poetry [and] insanity". Another image depicted a whiteboard featuring various words and phrases, including "you can have it all", "clarity = power", and "Swans vs Adele".

On 11 August, Welch began posting more cryptic teasers, including a short video of herself in a red dress digging a hole in a field before screaming into it. The album was officially announced on 19 August 2025, with a release date of 31 October 2025, coinciding with Halloween. The cover art features a fisheye-lens shot of Welch lying on a bed in a wooden setting, wearing a black-and-white outfit. The following day, the title track was released as the album's lead single.

The album, which follows on from 2022's Dance Fever, was created during and inspired by a time of healing and discovering the body's limits for Welch, who underwent life-saving surgery during 2023's Dance Fever Tour. Because of this, Welch told Zane Lowe during an interview that she feels Everybody Scream is her most personal Florence and the Machine album to date. She also mentioned the project's title coming from the idea of celebratory screaming and her exploration of why people would be screaming and the emotions and reasons associated with such a physical and emotional act. On October 24, Welch announced the Everybody Scream Tour, expected to visit Europe and North America.

== Release ==
Following the announcement, pre-orders went live for vinyl, CD and cassette editions, including several variants. Deluxe editions on CD and vinyl include additional "chamber versions" of four tracks.

== Critical reception ==
Professional ratings
Aggregate scores
Source	Rating
AnyDecentMusic?	8.2/10
Metacritic	81/100
Review scores
Source	Rating
AllMusic	4.0/5 stars
Consequence	B+
The Daily Telegraph	5/5 stars
The Guardian	4/5 stars
The Independent	4/5 stars
The Line of Best Fit	8/10
MusicOMH	4.5/5 stars
NME	5/5 stars
Pitchfork	6.8/10
Rolling Stone	4/5 stars

According to the review aggregator Metacritic, Everybody Scream received "universal acclaim" based on a weighted average score of 81 out of 100 from sixteen critic scores. Writing for NME, Laura Molloy awarded the album five stars out of five and praised Welch's presentation of the "brutal, ugly and raw sides of femininity" and "a chronically online generation clutching at new age practices for relief." Margaret Farrell, writing for Stereogum, described the album as "an incredibly fulfilling listen — moving, entrancing, and a downright optimal soundtrack for dancing naked under the moonlight".

Sam Rosenberg rated the album seven and a half out of ten in a review for Paste, praising it as a "guttural, flinty rock record that’s both perfectly suited for Welch and her band’s mystical aesthetic and in dialogue with Welch’s fascination with the occult in her past efforts", but also noting that there are moments "where the modern and medieval sensibilities clash a bit and threaten to throw the album off its initially steady, clear-eyed axis." David James Young, writing for The Australian, also noted the album's "conflicted lyricism", particularly on the song "One of the Greats", but praised tracks including the title track and "You Can Have It All" as "immensely satisfying" and "unlike anything quite like [Florence +] The Machine has produced before."

=== Rankings ===
Year-end rankings for Everybody Scream
Publication	Accolade	Rank	Ref.
Billboard	The 50 Best Albums of 2025	29	
Consequence	The 50 Best Albums of 2025	50	
Hot Press	Albums of the Year	5	
KEXP	KEXP's Best Albums of 2025	16	
NME	The 50 Best Albums of 2025	27	
The Observer	The Best Albums of 2025	7	
PopMatters	The 80 Best Albums of 2025	31	
Radio X	The 25 Best Indie Albums of 2025	6	
Rolling Stone	The 100 Best Albums of 2025	25	
The Telegraph	10 Best Albums of 2025	1	

== Commercial performance ==
Everybody Scream debuted at number one on the UK Albums Chart with 31,369 units (15,476 CDs, 8,504 vinyl albums, 1,724 cassettes, 1,370 digital downloads and 4,295 sales-equivalent streams). The album marks the fifth number-one album from the band on the chart. In the US, Everybody Scream debuted at number four on the Billboard 200 with 56,000 album-equivalent units, of which 44,000 were pure album sales.

== Track listing ==
Everybody Scream track listing
No.	Title	Writer(s)	Producer(s)	Length
1.	"Everybody Scream"	Florence Welch; Mark Bowen; Mitski Miyawaki	Welch; Bowen; James Ford; Aaron Dessner	4:04
2.	"One of the Greats"	Welch; Bowen	Bowen; Dessner	6:32
3.	"Witch Dance"	Welch; Bowen	Welch; Bowen; Dessner; Danny L Harle^{[a]}	4:23
4.	"Sympathy Magic"	Welch; Danny L Harle	Welch; Dessner; Harle; Solomonophonic^{[a]}	4:28
5.	"Perfume and Milk"	Welch; Dessner	Welch; Dessner	4:08
6.	"Buckle"	Welch; Miyawaki	Welch; Dessner	3:23
7.	"Kraken"	Welch; Dessner; Dave Bayley	Welch; Dessner; Bayley; Bowen^{[a]}	3:50
8.	"The Old Religion"	Welch; Dessner	Welch; Dessner	3:40
9.	"Drink Deep"	Welch; Harle	Welch; Harle; Dessner	3:51
10.	"Music by Men"	Welch; Bowen	Welch; Bowen; Dessner	4:31
11.	"You Can Have It All"	Welch; Bowen	Welch; Bowen; Dessner	3:59
12.	"And Love"	Welch; Bowen	Welch; Bowen; Dessner	2:44
Total length:				49:39

=== Note ===
- ^{^[a]} indicates an additional producer

== Personnel ==
Credits adapted from Tidal.

- Florence Welch – lead vocals, background vocals (all tracks); tambourine (tracks 2, 11); shaker, pre-production (2); percussion (3, 8), chimes (3, 11); clapstick, drums (4, 8); grand piano (11)
- Aaron Dessner – electric guitar (1, 2, 5–11), shaker (1, 3, 7, 8, 11), bass synthesizer (1, 4, 5, 8, 9, 11), synthesizer (1, 5–12), acoustic guitar (1, 5–7, 10, 11), piano (1, 8), bass guitar (3, 5–12), Mellotron (3, 5–7, 9–11), grand piano (3, 6), cymbals (3), drum programming (5–8), drums (5, 6, 8, 9, 11), tambourine (5), percussion (6, 9), upright piano (7, 10, 12); 12-string acoustic guitar, guitar (7)
- Elysian Collective – strings (1–4, 10, 11)
  - Emma Smith – violin
  - Jennymay Logan – violin
  - Richard Jones – viola
  - Laura Moody – cello
- Mark Bowen – bass guitar (1–3, 7), synthesizer (1–3, 11, 12), drums (1, 3, 11), bass synthesizer (1, 10, 11), percussion (1), organ (2, 3, 7), guitar (2, 7), sound effects (2), piano (3, 11), electric guitar (10, 11); acoustic guitar, upright piano (11)
- James McAlister – synthesizer (1, 3, 4, 6–8), drum programming (1, 3, 4, 8), sampler (1, 3, 5); electric guitar, tambourine (1); drums, Omnichord, percussion (3); bass synthesizer, Rhodes (6); maracas (8)
- Deep Throat Choir – background vocals (1, 3, 11, 12)
  - Rosa Clay Slade
  - Elly Condron
  - Katy Beth Young
  - Luisa Gerstein
  - Miryam Solomon
- Tom "Moth" Monger – harp (1–4, 7, 10, 12)
- Benjamin Lanz – synthesizer (1, 2, 4, 7, 8), trombone (1, 7, 8), sampler (1), tambourine (2, 4)
- Ian Thomas – drums (1, 2, 11)
- Leo Abrahams – electric guitar (1, 2, 11)
- Steve Pearce – bass guitar (1, 2)
- Chris Vatalaro – piano (1, 2)
- Aaron Paris – programming, string arrangement, strings (1, 3, 10, 11)
- Mitski Miyawaki – piano (1), background vocals (6)
- Stuart Bogie – bass clarinet (1, 7, 9–11); baritone saxophone, cello, tenor saxophone (1); bass harmonica (7, 9), clarinet (7, 11)
- Colin Webster – saxophone (1, 11)
- James Ford – bass clarinet, bass synthesizer, drums, drum programming, electric guitar, grand piano, Hammond B3, percussion, piano, synthesizer, tambourine (1)
- Kenneth Blume III – drum programming (1)
- Hayden Anhedönia – background vocals (2)
- Jon Beavis – drums (2)
- Danny L Harle – tenor viol (3, 4, 9); bass synthesizer, synthesizer (3, 4); sound effects (3); piano (4, 9); acoustic guitar, drum programming, flute, percussion (4); bass guitar, bells, chimes, drums, electric guitar, violin (9)
- Andrew Barr – cymbals (3, 5), drums (3, 9); bass guitar, chimes (3); gong (5)
- Jared Solomon – congas, drums, piano, shaker, timbales (4)
- Dave Bayley – acoustic guitar, drums, drum programming, electric guitar, Mellotron, percussion, upright piano (7)
- Oleg Kondratenko – conductor (8)
- Fame's Studio Orchestra – orchestra (8)
- Bryce Dessner – synthesizer (8)
- Idrîsî Ensemble – background vocals (9)
  - Dunja Botic
  - Eliza Oakes
  - Elsa Hackett-Esteban
  - Noémie Ducimetière

=== Technical ===
- Bella Blasko – engineering (all tracks), mixing (1–3, 8, 9)
- Billy Halliday – engineering (1–4, 6, 7, 10–12)
- Bryce Bordone – engineering (4–7, 10–12)
- Distant Fur – engineering (5)
- James McAlister – engineering (6), additional engineering (1, 3, 4, 7, 8)
- Benjamin Lanz – additional engineering (1, 2, 4, 7, 8)
- Stuart Bogie – additional engineering (1, 7, 9–11)
- Mark Bowen – additional engineering (2)
- Danny L Harle – additional engineering (3, 4)
- Arber Curri – additional engineering (8)
- Bryce Dessner – additional engineering (8)
- Marina Lefkova – additional engineering (8)
- Serban Ghenea – mixing (4–7, 10–12)
- Randy Merrill – mastering

== Charts ==
=== Weekly charts ===
Weekly chart performance for Everybody Scream
Chart (2025)	Peak position
Australian Albums (ARIA)	4
Austrian Albums (Ö3 Austria)	1
Belgian Albums (Ultratop Flanders)	3
Belgian Albums (Ultratop Wallonia)	4
Canadian Albums (Billboard)	9
Croatian International Albums (HDU)	12
Dutch Albums (Album Top 100)	3
Finnish Albums (Suomen virallinen lista)	26
French Albums (SNEP)	16
French Rock & Metal Albums (SNEP)	2
German Albums (Offizielle Top 100)	3
German Rock & Metal Albums (Offizielle Top 100)	1
Greek Albums (IFPI)	5
Irish Albums (Official Charts)	3
Italian Albums (FIMI)	15
Lithuanian Albums (AGATA)	90
New Zealand Albums (RMNZ)	6
Norwegian Albums (IFPI Norge)	64
Polish Albums (ZPAV)	3
Portuguese Albums (AFP)	6
Scottish Albums (Official Charts)	1
Spanish Albums (PROMUSICAE)	11
Swedish Albums (Sverigetopplistan)	25
Swiss Albums (Schweizer Hitparade)	2
UK Albums (Official Charts)	1
US Billboard 200	4
US Top Rock & Alternative Albums (Billboard)	1

=== Year-end charts ===
Year-end chart performance for Everybody Scream
Chart (2025)	Position
German Albums (Offizielle Top 100)	94

== Certifications ==
Certifications for Everybody Scream
Region	Certification	Certified units/sales
United Kingdom (BPI)	Silver	60,000^{‡}
^{‡} Sales+streaming figures based on certification alone.
