= Florence and the Machine =

English indie rock band

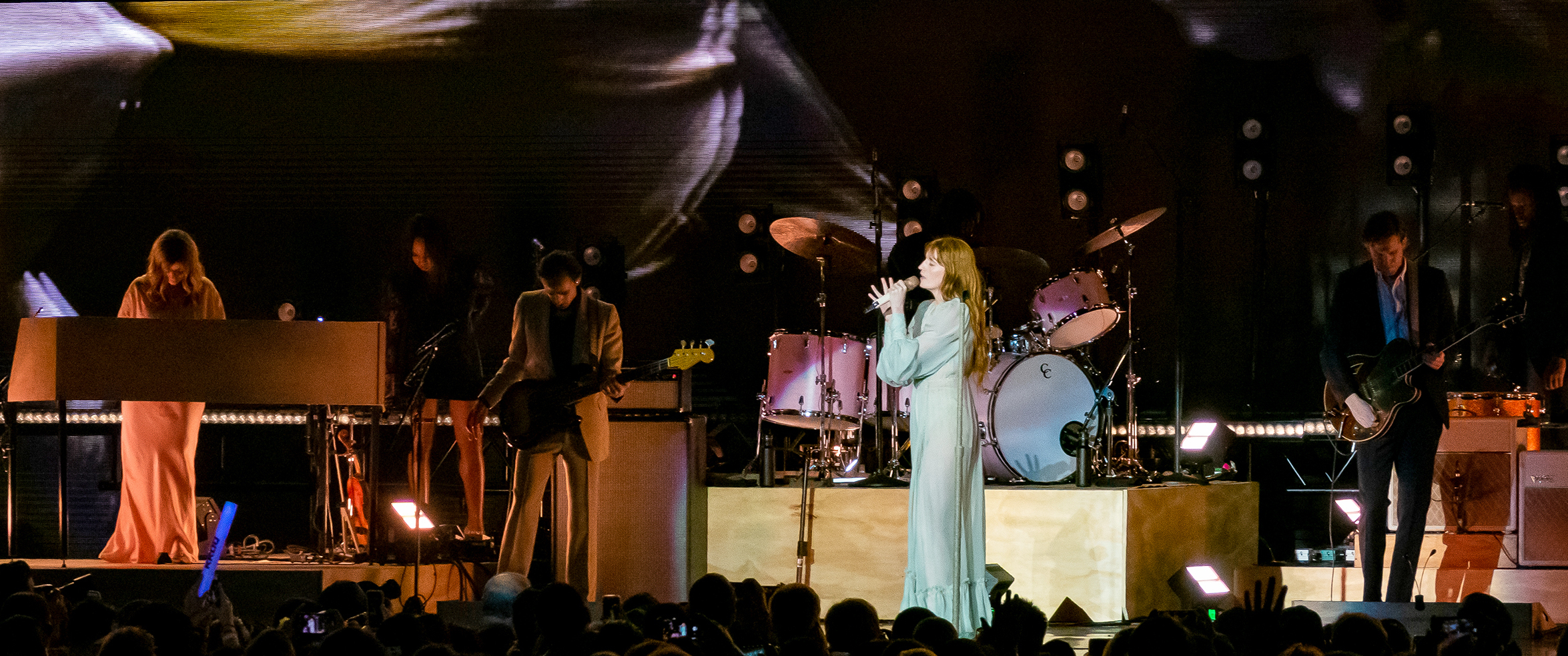
- Performing live at KROQ Almost Acoustic Christmas in Inglewood, California, 2018

Background information
- Origin: London, England
- Genres: Indie rock; alternative rock; baroque pop; soul
- Works: Florence and the Machine discography
- Years active: 2007–present
- Labels: Moshi Moshi; Iamsound; Island; Republic; Universal Republic; Virgin EMI; Polydor
- Members: Florence Welch; Isabella Summers; Tom Monger; Cyrus Bayandor; Aku Orraca-Tetteh; Cian Hanley; Harry Fausing Smith
- Past members: Christopher Lloyd Hayden; Rusty Bradshaw; Mark Saunders; Sam Doyle; Hazel Mills; Robert Ackroyd; Dionne Douglas; Loren Humphrey
- Website: florenceandthemachine.net

Florence and the Machine (stylised as Florence + the Machine) are an English indie rock band formed in London in 2007 by lead vocalist Florence Welch, keyboardist Isabella Summers, guitarist Rob Ackroyd, drummer Christopher Lloyd Hayden and harpist Tom Monger. The band's music features dramatic, eccentric productions and Welch's powerful vocals. Their sound has been described as a combination of various genres, including alternative rock, baroque pop and soul.

The band's debut album, Lungs, was released on 3 July 2009, and held the number-two position for its first five weeks on the UK Albums Chart. On 17 January 2010, the album reached the top position, after being on the chart for twenty-eight consecutive weeks. The album was in the top forty in the United Kingdom for sixty-five consecutive weeks, making it one of the best-selling albums of 2009 and 2010.

The group's second album, Ceremonials, released in October 2011, entered the charts at number one in the UK and number six in the US. The band's third album, How Big, How Blue, How Beautiful, was released on 2 June 2015. It topped the UK charts, and debuted at number one on the US Billboard 200, their first to do so. The album reached number one in a total of eight countries and the top ten of twenty. Also in 2015, the band was the headlining act at Glastonbury Festival, making Welch the first British female headliner of the 21st century to do so.

The BBC played a part in their rise to prominence by promoting Florence and the Machine as part of BBC Music Introducing. At the 2009 Brit Awards, they received the Critics' Choice Award. Lungs won the Brit Award for Best British Album in 2010, while Florence and the Machine have been nominated for six Grammy Awards including Best New Artist and Best Pop Vocal Album.

== History ==
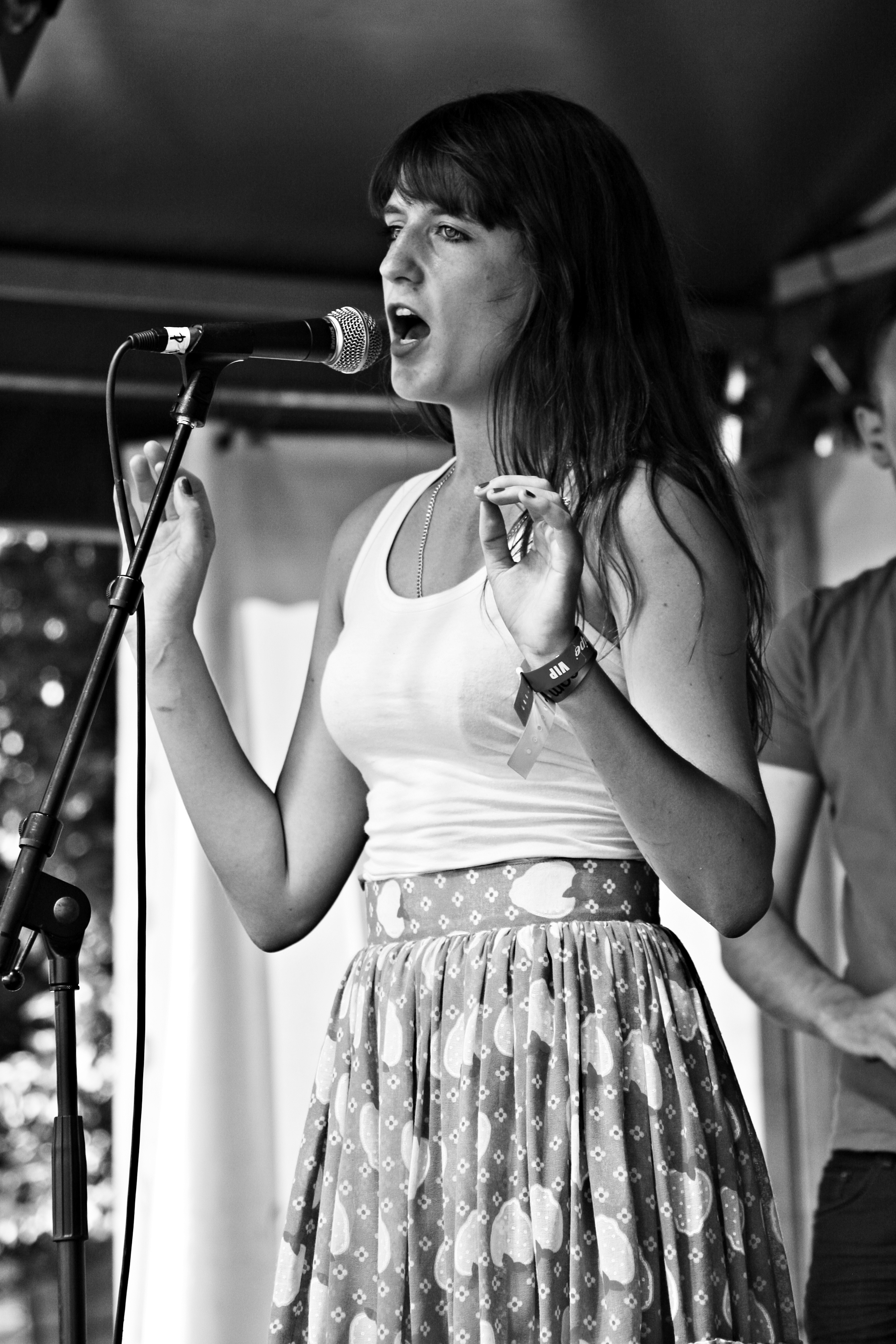
Florence Welch performing live in Shoreditch Park, London, 2007

=== 2007–2010: Formation and Lungs ===
The name of Florence and the Machine is attributed to Florence Welch's teenage collaboration with Isabella "Machine" Summers. Welch and Summers performed together for a time under the name Florence Robot/Isa Machine. According to Welch, "The name Florence and the Machine started off as a private joke that got out of hand. I made music with my friend, who we called Isabella Machine to which I was Florence Robot. When I was about an hour away from my first gig, I still didn't have a name, so I thought 'Okay, I'll be Florence Robot Is A Machine', before realising that name was so long it'd drive me mad." In addition to Summers (keyboards), the current band members include musicians Robert Ackroyd (guitar), Chris Hayden (drums, percussion and backing vocals), Mark Saunders (bass guitar and percussion) and Tom Monger (harp). In the past, Welch has praised her band for understanding her creative process, claiming, "I've worked with most of them for a long time and they know my style, know the way I write, they know what I want."

In 2007, Welch recorded with a band named Ashok, who released an album titled Plans on the Filthy Lucre/About Records label. This album included the earliest version of her later hit "Kiss with a Fist", which at this point was titled "Happy Slap".

Florence and the Machine released their first album Lungs in the Netherlands and Ireland on 3 July 2009. The album was produced by James Ford, Paul Epworth, Steve Mackey, Isabella Summers and Charlie Hugall. The album was officially launched with a set at the Rivoli Ballroom in Brockley, south-east London. It peaked at number one in the UK and number two in Ireland. As of 6 August 2009, the album had sold more than 100,000 copies in the UK and by 10 August it had been at number two for five consecutive weeks. Following its 25 July 2009 release for download in the United States, the album entered the charts at number seventeen on the Billboard Heatseekers Albums chart, ultimately peaking at number one. The album was released physically in the US on 20 October by Universal Republic.

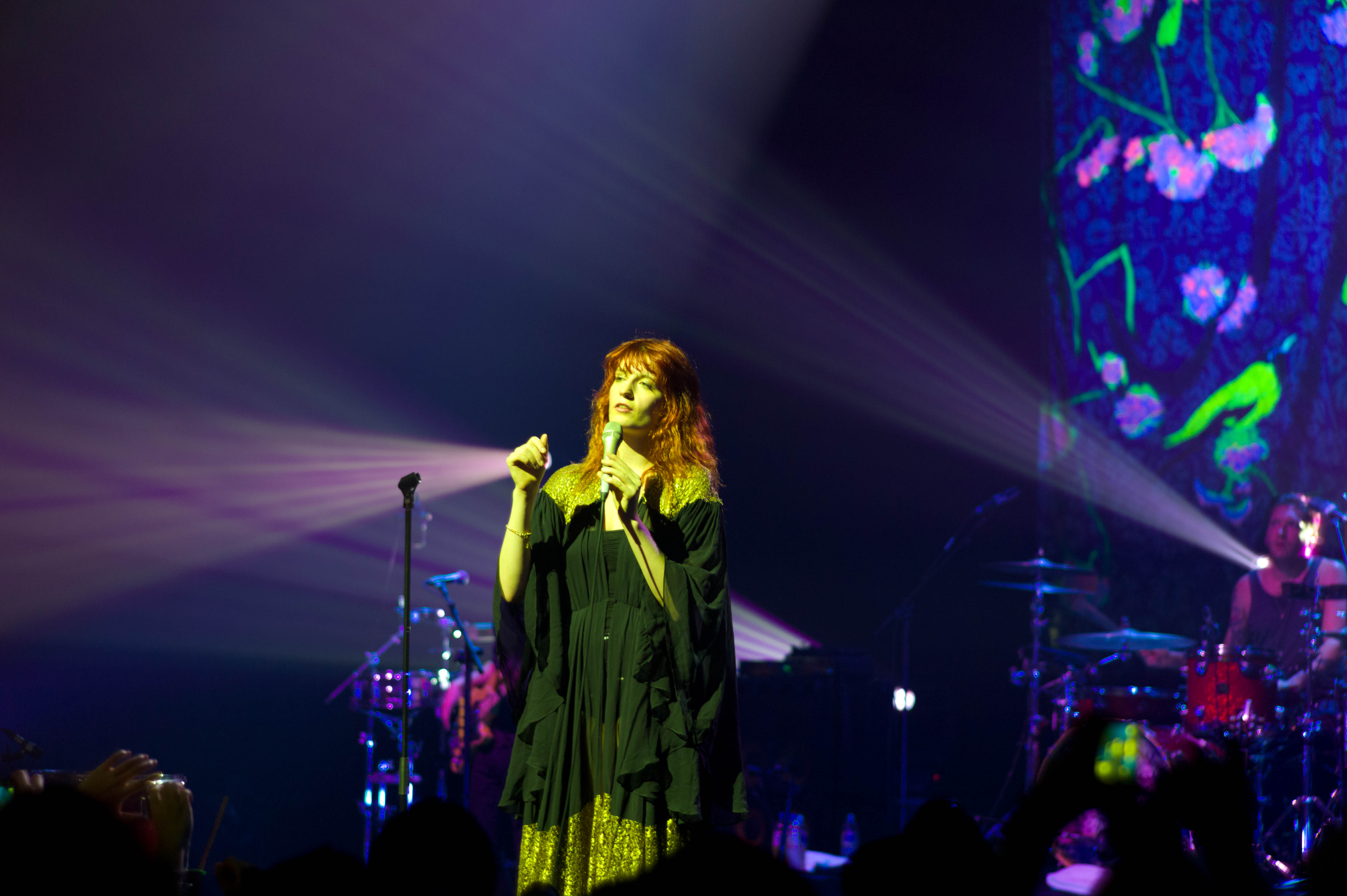
Lead vocalist Welch performing live in Singapore, 2010

"Kiss with a Fist" was released as the album's lead single on 9 June 2008. The track was featured on the soundtrack to the films Wild Child (2008), Jennifer's Body (2009), and St Trinian's 2: The Legend of Fritton's Gold (2009), as well as in the television series 90210, Community and Saving Grace. Follow-up single "Dog Days Are Over", released on 1 December 2008, was recorded with no instruments in a studio the "size of a loo". The song was used in the American television series Gossip Girl, Covert Affairs, in the British television series Skins, and in the theatrical trailer for the 2010 comedy-drama film Eat Pray Love, starring Julia Roberts. "Dog Days Are Over" was also featured in the Glee episode "Special Education", where it was covered by Jenna Ushkowitz and Amber Riley. "Rabbit Heart (Raise It Up)" was released on 22 June 2009 as the third single from the album.

After the release of Lungs, "Drumming Song" and a cover of the Source and Candi Staton's 1986 song "You've Got the Love" were released as singles. "Cosmic Love" was released on 5 July 2010 as the sixth and final single from Lungs, with a music video having already been shot. The song was featured in several American television shows, including Grey's Anatomy, The Vampire Diaries, V, Nikita and So You Think You Can Dance. The band also made a guest appearance on 7 February 2011 episode of Gossip Girl, titled "Panic Roommate", where they performed an acoustic rendition of "Cosmic Love". On 12 May 2010, it was announced that Florence and the Machine would provide a track called "Heavy in Your Arms" for the soundtrack to The Twilight Saga: Eclipse, the third film of The Twilight Saga. Eclipse was released in cinemas on 30 June 2010, with "Heavy in Your Arms" playing during the end credits. The music video followed on 7 July 2010. An exclusive remix of "I'm Not Calling You a Liar" is featured in the 2011 video game Dragon Age II as "I'm Not Calling You a Liar (Dragon Age II: Varric's Theme)", produced by the game's composer Inon Zur.

=== 2011–2013: Ceremonials ===
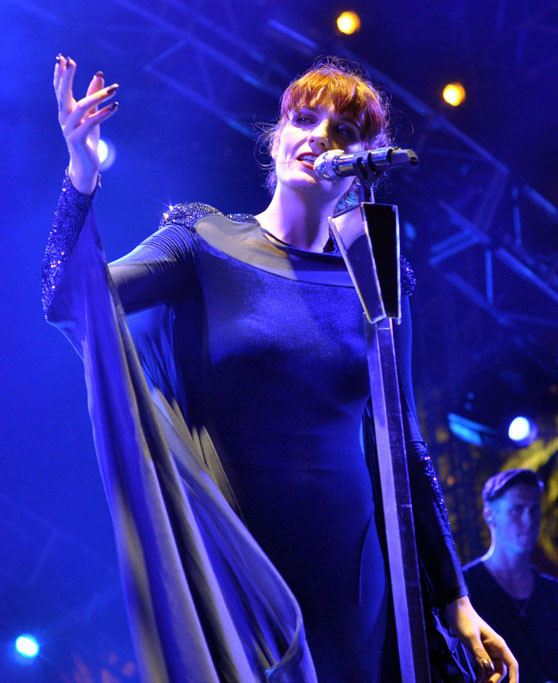
Florence and the Machine performing live at Coachella 2012 in Indio, California

The first demo session occurred in January 2010 with Welch and Paul Epworth at a small London studio. Numerous producers expressed an interest in working on the album but Welch rejected the offers because she wanted Ceremonials to be a better version of Lungs with a "more dark, more heavy, bigger drum sounds, bigger bass, but with more of a whole sound". For the rest of the year work on the album continued only intermittently as the band concentrated on an extensive tour of the US, where Lungs had become popular. The majority of the writing for the album was done between January and April 2011, with recording taking place in April at Abbey Road Studios. Refinement took place at Epworth's own London studios while Welch recorded vocal tracks in various US studios, during days off from touring. The final recording session took place in July at Epworth's studio. Epworth co-wrote seven tracks. Several other British writers share credits on the album, including Summers, Kid Harpoon, James Ford and composer Eg White.

In June 2011, a cover of the Buddy Holly song "Not Fade Away", which Florence and the Machine recorded for the tribute album Rave On Buddy Holly tied to Holly's seventy-fifth birthday year, was released and they performed Ceremonials' setup track "What the Water Gave Me" at the Greek Theatre in Berkeley, California. In August 2011, the single "What the Water Gave Me" was released on iTunes along with an accompanying video on the band's website and YouTube channel. The video drew 1.5 million YouTube views in two days and the track received play on US alternative radio with strong support from Los Angeles radio station KROQ. The single "Shake It Out" was released over the internet in September 2011, with standard release 11 October. In Australia, the song was playlisted at Triple J and Nova radio networks and received strong airplay in The Nordics, Italy and Canada.

The band's second album, Ceremonials, was released on 28 October 2011. It reached number one on the UK Albums Chart and number six on the US Billboard 200. On 12 January 2012, Florence and the Machine were nominated for two Brit Awards, Best British Female Artist and British Album of the Year, with the awards ceremony taking place on 21 February 2012 at the O2 Arena, London. On 26 April 2012, the band released "Breath of Life", a song that was recorded as the official theme song for the film Snow White and the Huntsman. On 5 July 2012, a remix of "Spectrum (Say My Name)" by Scottish musician Calvin Harris was released as the fourth single from Ceremonials, becoming the band's first UK number-one hit. Welch expressed excitement about putting new material together for a third album after the band finishes touring at the end of September 2012. Welch collaborated for a second time with Harris on the song "Sweet Nothing", released on 12 October 2012 as a single from Harris's third album 18 Months (2012). The song entered at number one on the UK Singles Chart, becoming their second collaborative number-one single.

In mid-2012, it was announced that Universal Republic Records was going defunct, moving all artists including Florence and the Machine to Republic Records making the label itself revived. In late August 2012, Welch told Style magazine that she plans to take a twelve-month hiatus before starting work on the band's next album, stating, "There's a big 'take a year off' plan. The record company have put no pressure on me for the next album. They've said I can have as long as I want." In December 2012, Florence and the Machine were nominated for Best Pop Vocal Album for Ceremonials and Best Pop Duo/Group Performance for "Shake It Out" at the 54th Annual Grammy Awards. On 4 April 2013, it was announced that Florence and the Machine had written a song for Baz Luhrmann's film rendition of The Great Gatsby (2013), titled "Over the Love", which was released on 17 April 2013 on SoundCloud.

=== 2014–2016: How Big, How Blue, How Beautiful ===
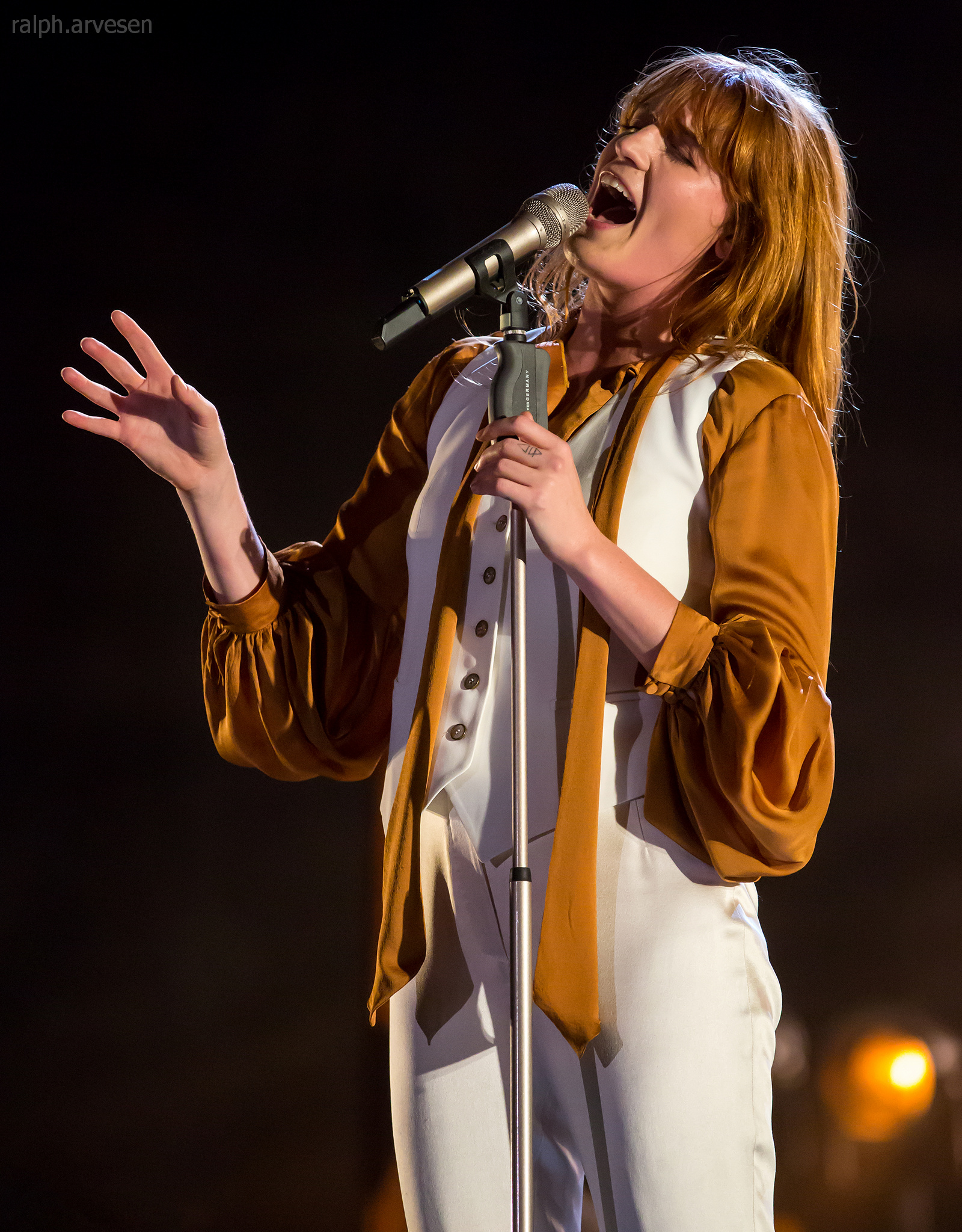
Welch performing live in Austin, Texas, 2015

On 4 June 2014, Welch told NME that the band's third album was in the works. In January 2015, a fansite posted a photo showing Florence and the Machine's upcoming album being mixed in a recording studio. On 9 February, the band played all the songs from the new album in full, among them "Ship to Wreck", "Caught", "Delilah" and the album's first single, "What Kind of Man" in a private London show. The next day, on 10 February, the band released a short music video for the title track of their 2015 album, How Big, How Blue, How Beautiful, which also acted as the official album teaser, directed by Tabitha Denholm and Vincent Haycock and shot in Mexico. The single and album were available to pre-order subsequently on all popular online music stores. The music video is just under three minutes as compared to the five minute album version of the track. On 12 February, the album's lead single "What Kind of Man" was revealed on Zane Lowe's BBC Radio 1 show, followed by the release of music video later that day on band's Vevo channel via YouTube.

The band released a music video of another track called "St. Jude" on 23 March. The video was choreographed by Ryan Heffington and directed by Vincent Haycock; it continues the narrative from the previous video of "What Kind of Man". On 8 April, the album's second single titled "Ship to Wreck" premiered on Huw Stephens' show on BBC Radio 1. The accompanying music video was released a week later on 13 April, continuing the storyline of past two videos. On 19 May, DJ Annie Mac revealed another new song from the record on her BBC radio show, namely "Delilah".

The album was released on 29 May in Germany, 1 June in the UK and 2 June in the US. A deluxe version of the album containing five additional tracks was released on 13 May 2015. The album became their third number one on the UK Albums Chart, and debuted at number one on the US Billboard 200. The album earned five nominations in the 58th Annual Grammy Awards.

The band were confirmed for numerous European festivals in summer 2015 including Way Out West in Sweden, Super Bock Super Rock in Portugal and Rock Werchter in Belgium, among others. In June 2015, it was announced that the band would headline the Glastonbury Festival in Pilton, Somerset due to the withdrawal of previous headliners Foo Fighters, after lead vocalist Dave Grohl fractured his leg on stage in Sweden. Florence and the Machine's Glastonbury set was critically acclaimed by numerous outlets. Welch thanked Grohl for his support following their choice as a replacement and wished him a speedy recovery, before performing a cover of the Foo Fighters' "Times Like These". On 7 December 2015, the band received five nominations for the 58th Annual Grammy Awards to be held in 2016. These nominations included "Ship to Wreck" for Best Pop Duo/Group Performance, How Big, How Blue, How Beautiful for Best Pop Vocal Album and Best Recording Package, and "What Kind of Man" for Best Rock Performance and Best Rock Song.

In 2016 Florence and the Machine recorded a classical cover of Ben E. King's 1961 song "Stand by Me", which was featured as the main theme to the video game Final Fantasy XV. It was premiered during the "Uncovered: Final Fantasy XV" event on 30 March 2016, and the full version was released on 12 August 2016. Alongside their "Stand by Me" cover, they also composed two original songs for Final Fantasy XV, entitled "I Will Be" and "Too Much Is Never Enough", which were also released on 12 August 2016. In April 2016, the band released The Odyssey, a short film by Vincent Haycock and Welch that consisted of all music videos shot within the How Big, How Blue, How Beautiful (2015) era, together with some interconnecting sung and spoken scenes. The premiere took place at London's Rio Cinema on 20 April 2016, and was followed by an unrecorded Q&A. The online world premiere on 21 April 2016 was delayed to the 24th due to Prince's death. The band contributed a song to the 2016 Tim Burton film Miss Peregrine's Home for Peculiar Children titled "Wish That You Were Here", released as a single on 25 August 2016.

=== 2017–2024: High as Hope and Dance Fever ===
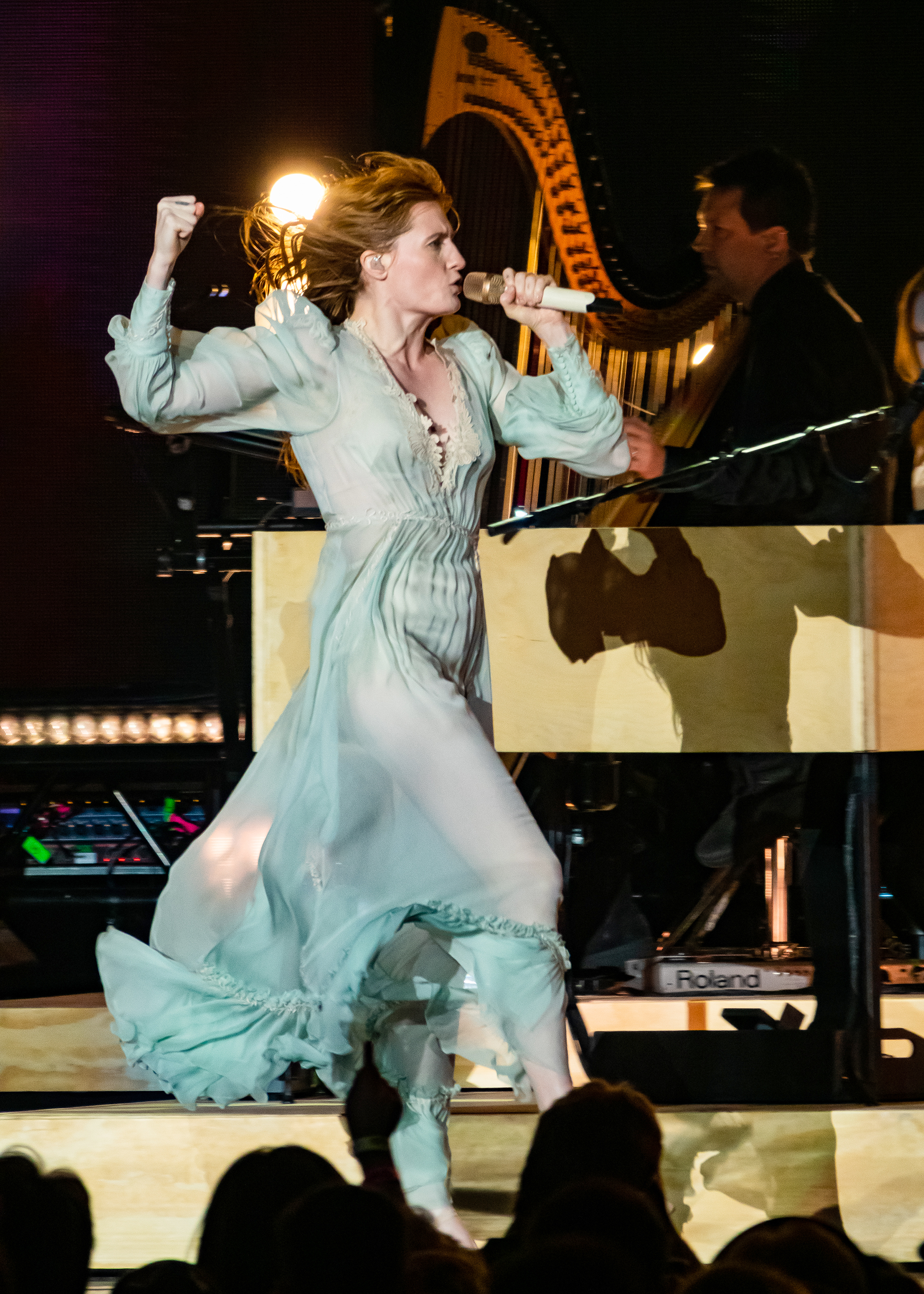
Florence and the Machine performing live in Los Angeles, 2018

Welch confirmed on 27 May 2017 that a new album was in the works. On 28 February 2018, the band's drummer, Christopher Hayden, announced that he had left the band. Florence worked with Brett Shaw at 123 Studios in Peckham to record the raw beginnings of the songs from the album.The first single from the album, "Sky Full of Song", was released on 12 April 2018, followed by "Hunger" in May. Titled High as Hope, the band's fourth album was released on 29 June 2018. A third single, "Patricia", was released on 10 August 2018. On 24 January 2019, Florence and the Machine released a new single, "Moderation", which had been previously performed live during the Australian leg of the High as Hope Tour. It was accompanied by a B-side, "Haunted House".

On 21 April 2019, Florence and the Machine had a song featured in the Game of Thrones episode "A Knight of the Seven Kingdoms" which was composed by Ramin Djawadi. The song is entitled "Jenny of Oldstones". On 17 April 2020, Florence and the Machine released the song "Light of Love" in response to the COVID-19 pandemic. The band announced that all proceeds from the song, which was originally recorded for High as Hope (2018), would go to the Intensive Care Society.

In early 2022, Florence and the Machine were confirmed to be headlining a series of summer music festivals, including the Madrid's Mad Cool. Towards the end of February 2022, fans of the band started to receive letters with a print titled, "King – Chapter 1", as well as a billboard in London displaying the visual of the work. Speculation indicating that a new single was about to be released were confirmed on 22 February by Welch herself through her Instagram account. The single, titled "King" was digitally released the next day along with its accompanying music video. Soon after, the single "Heaven Is Here" was released on 7 March. On 9 March 2022, Welch announced Dance Fever, the band's fifth album in a post to her Instagram account also revealing the album cover and pre-order date. She described the album as "a fairytale in 14 songs" in the same post. The announcement was followed up with the release of the third single "My Love" on 10 March. On 20 April, the fourth single "Free" was released. The album was released on 13 May. It debuted at number one in the UK and number two in Australia. In 2022, keyboardist Hazel Mills and drummer Loren Humphrey left the band. On 16 March 2022, Sam Doyle (drummer from the Maccabees) was confirmed as joining the band on tour for this era. However, Humphrey rejoined the band in summer of 2022. On 15 May 2022, a deluxe of Dance Fever was released, featuring four new acoustic songs and a cover of Iggy Pop's song "Search and Destroy". On 21 April 2023, a version of the album named the "complete edition" was released, including the new single "Mermaids".

In 2024, Florence and the Machine collaborated with Taylor Swift on the track "Florida!!!" from Swift's album The Tortured Poets Department; Welch also co-wrote the song. In 2025, Florence and the Machine collaborated with singer The Weeknd on the track "Reflections Laughing" from his album Hurry Up Tomorrow, which also featured rapper Travis Scott.

=== 2025: Everybody Scream ===
In August 2025, Welch began teasing a potential return through a series of cryptic posts on her social media accounts. Their sixth album, Everybody Scream, was announced to be released on 31 October 2025. On 20 August 2025, the band released the title track as the lead single. The second single, "One of The Greats" was released on 24 September 2025. Welch said that the song was originally written as a long poem and then recorded in one take, which she "sang straight from the page". Singles "Sympathy Magic" and "Buckle" followed. The album was released on Halloween and debuted at number one on six charts and number four on the Billboard Hot 100. The baroque, orchestral, chamber pop album was named by Welch as the most personal as it delved into her near-death experience in 2023 on the Dance Fever Tour that explores elements of witchcraft, folk horror, mysticism, magic, poetry, insanity and death. In 2026, the band embarked on the Everybody Scream Tour to promote the album, visiting arenas across Europe and North America, such as The O2 Arena in London and Madison Square Garden in New York City, and headlining many European Music Festivals, including Reading and Leeds Festival and Mad Cool.

== Performances ==
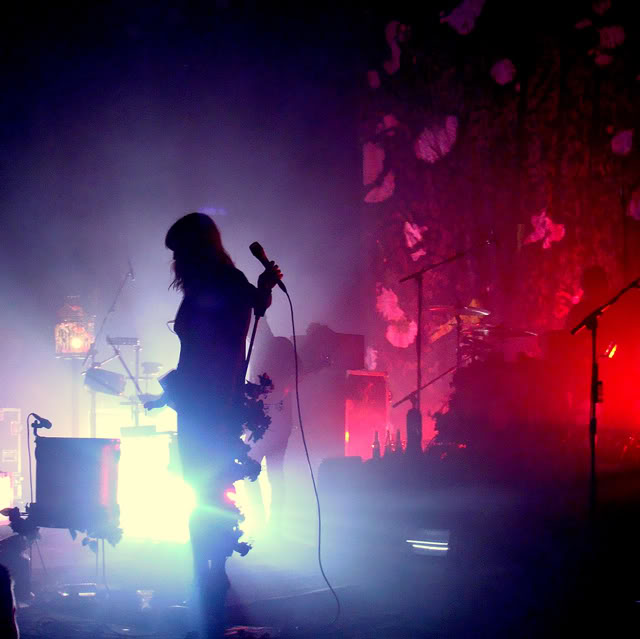
Florence and the Machine performing live at the O_{2} ABC Glasgow during their Lungs Tour

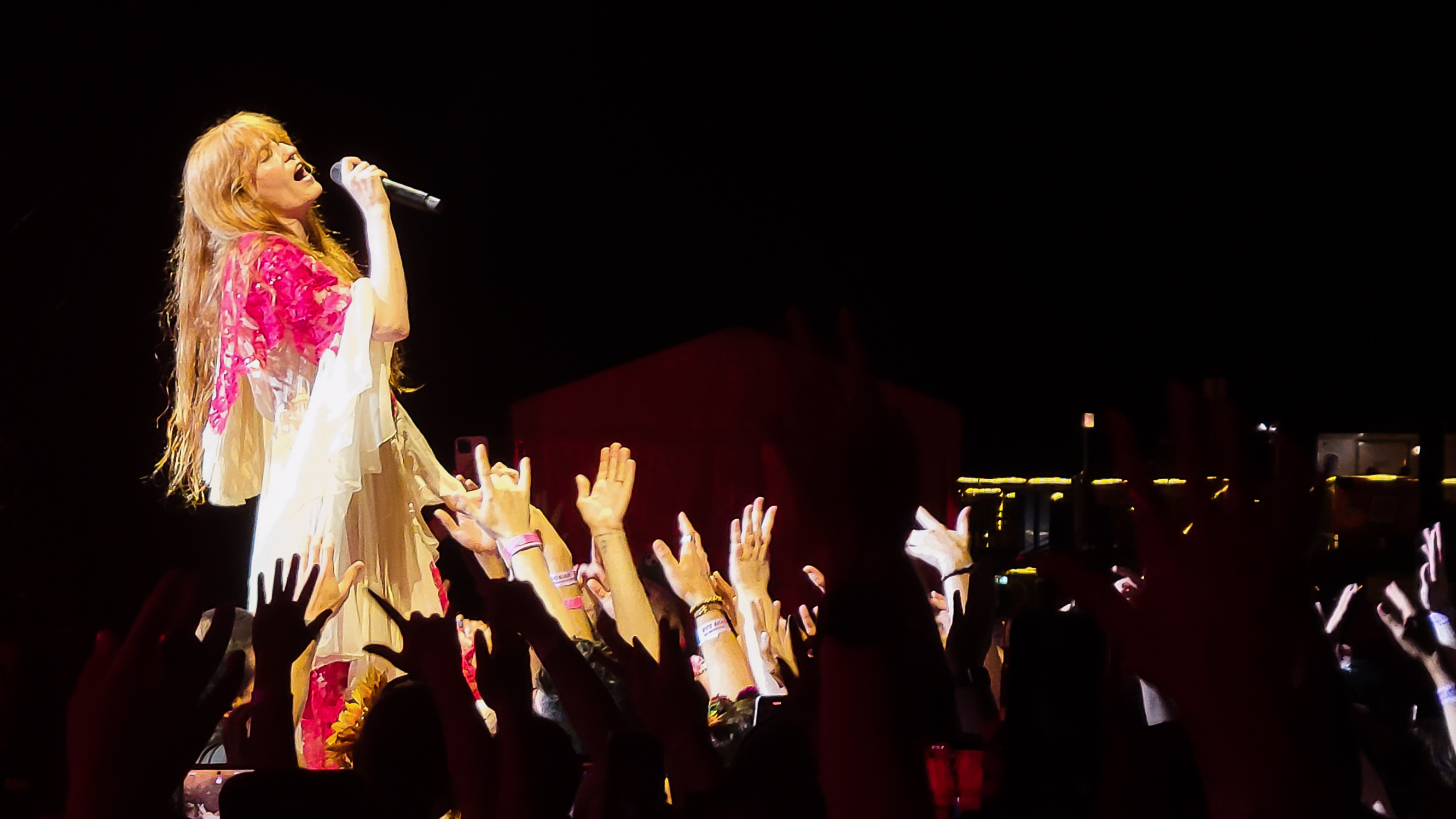
Florence and the Machine performing during the Dance Fever Tour in Chicago

Florence and the Machine started off by playing a handful of gigs in and around London. In November 2008 Florence played a legendarily intimate show for Get It Loud In Libraries at Lancaster Library. In May 2008, they supported MGMT on tour in Europe. The BBC played a large part in Florence and the Machine's rise to prominence by promoting her as part of BBC Introducing. This led to their playing music festivals in 2008, including Glastonbury, Reading and Leeds and Bestival. Florence and the Machine were also part of the Shockwaves NME Awards Tour 2009 in January and February.

The group has supported the UK Teenage Cancer Trust, performing at a concert for the charity at London's Royal Albert Hall in March 2009. Florence and the Machine supported Blur for their 26 June comeback performance at the Manchester Arena. They played at the Lovebox Festival on 18 and 19 July. In July 2009, the group supported Duran Duran. During summer 2009, Florence and the Machine performed at a number of major festivals in the UK and Ireland, including the Glastonbury Festival 2009, Reading and Leeds 2009, Electric Picnic 2009 and T in the Park 2009.

Florence and the Machine played at Australia's Splendour in the Grass music festival in July 2010. The group drew one of the biggest crowds of the three-day festival. They performed in the natural open-air amphitheatre, which had to be closed off by security due to safety concerns as an unprecedented number of festival-goers rushed to see the performance. It is estimated that 28,000 people of the 33,000 people who attended the festival crammed in to see Florence and the Machine. The amphitheatre was reopened shortly after the start, once the safety concerns were allayed. In October 2009, the band's equipment and instruments were caught in a trailer fire during their European tour, forcing the band to use rented instruments to complete their remaining shows. Welch stated, "You could hear the harp's strings ping in the fire. Strange sound. We recorded it and I want to use it in a song."

On 27 October 2009, Florence and the Machine played their first official New York City gig at the Bowery Ballroom, and performed "Kiss with a Fist" on the Late Show with David Letterman. On 5 November, the band performed "Rabbit Heart (Raise It Up)" on Jimmy Kimmel Live!. After the success of Lungs (2009) topping the UK Albums Chart in January 2010, seven months after the album was released, Florence and the Machine announced an eleven-date UK and Ireland tour called The Cosmic Love Tour in May 2010. Florence and the Machine performed at Oxegen 2010, T in the Park 2010, the Isle of Wight Festival 2010, Roskilde Festival 2010, V Festival 2010, and the San Miguel Primavera Sound 2010. In March 2010, it was that confirmed that the band's first headlining festival would be Latitude 2010, having been booked the previous September before achieving mainstream success.

The Cosmic Love Tour kicked off at Dublin's Olympia Theatre on 2 May 2010 where the group performed a new song called "Strangeness and Charm" and ended at London's Hammersmith Apollo on 15 May 2010. On 25 June, the group played the Glastonbury Festival 2010, where they performed "Strangeness and Charm" and a cover of Fleetwood Mac's "The Chain" during their ten-song set. Their performance drew one of the biggest crowds of the day and one of the biggest in the Other Stage's history. Florence and the Machine opened for U2 on the North American leg of their U2 360° Tour in June and July 2011. On 29 September 2019, the band finished their High as Hope Tour at the Acropolis. On 11 September 2024, Florence and the Machine performed as part of the 2024 BBC Proms, at the Royal Albert Hall, with Jules Buckley and his orchestra for "Symphony of Lungs", with organ by Anna Lapwood.

=== International appearances: Solo and as a group ===
In an interview with New York Post's PopWrap, Welch revealed that in the weeks and months prior to her performance of 12 September at the 2010 MTV Video Music Awards, she was so nervous she lost sleep and cried. In addition, she struggled during the pre-show rehearsal with a move that required her to stand up on a rotating platform. It was described as "both ethereal and downright joyous". After the performance, Lungs (2009) rose to number two on the iTunes albums chart and "Dog Days Are Over" rose to number nine on the iTunes singles chart. In addition, Florence and the Machine became the number-one search on Google and received 1,700 tweets per minute on Twitter. Florence and the Machine performed "Dog Days Are Over" on The Ellen DeGeneres Show on 15 October 2010. On 20 November 2010, the band performed "Dog Days Are Over" and "You've Got the Love" on Saturday Night Live. They performed an online-only concert at New York City's Ed Sullivan Theater on 16 December 2010 as part of the Live on Letterman concert series. Welch and a number of other female singers opened the 53rd Annual Grammy Awards on 13 February 2011 with a tribute to an ailing Aretha Franklin. On 27 February 2011, Welch replaced pregnant Dido and sang her portion of Best Original Song nominee "If I Rise" (from 127 Hours) with A. R. Rahman at the 83rd Academy Awards. Two years of worldwide touring had been scheduled to promote Ceremonials. Welch and guitarist Rob Ackroyd held a private performance for a terminally ill 15-year-old fan, Karinya Chen, in Austin, Texas on 23 May 2016.

== Style and influences ==
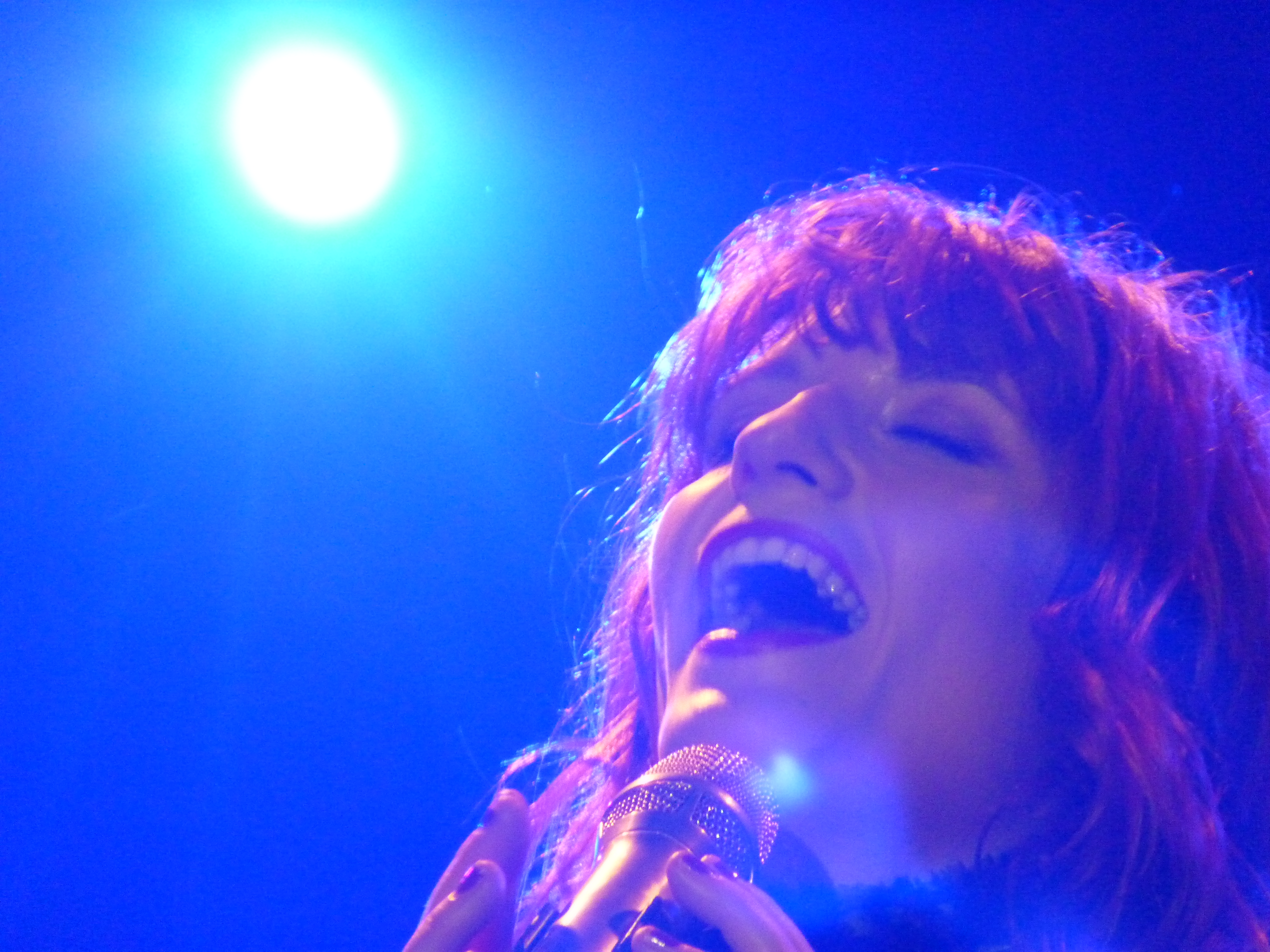
Florence and the Machine performing live at Terminal 5 in New York City, 2010

Florence Welch has been compared to Kate Bush, Siouxsie Sioux of Siouxsie and the Banshees, PJ Harvey, Tori Amos and Björk. During an interview, Welch cited Grace Slick of Jefferson Airplane as her influence and "hero". Florence and the Machine's style has been described as "dark, robust and romantic". Their music is a mix of "classic soul and midnight-on-the-moors English art rock". Welch stated that her lyrics related to Renaissance artists: "We're dealing with all of the same things they did—love and death, time and pain, heaven and hell." Commenting on her success, she said: "I'm lucky that there seems to be a massive revival in female performers. My icons were always women like Kate Bush, Stevie Nicks and Siouxsie Sioux. Who wouldn't be proud to carry on that tradition?".

The group's musical style has been described as indie rock, indie pop, baroque pop, chamber pop, art rock, art pop, neo soul, alternative rock, gothic rock and folk.

== Achievements ==
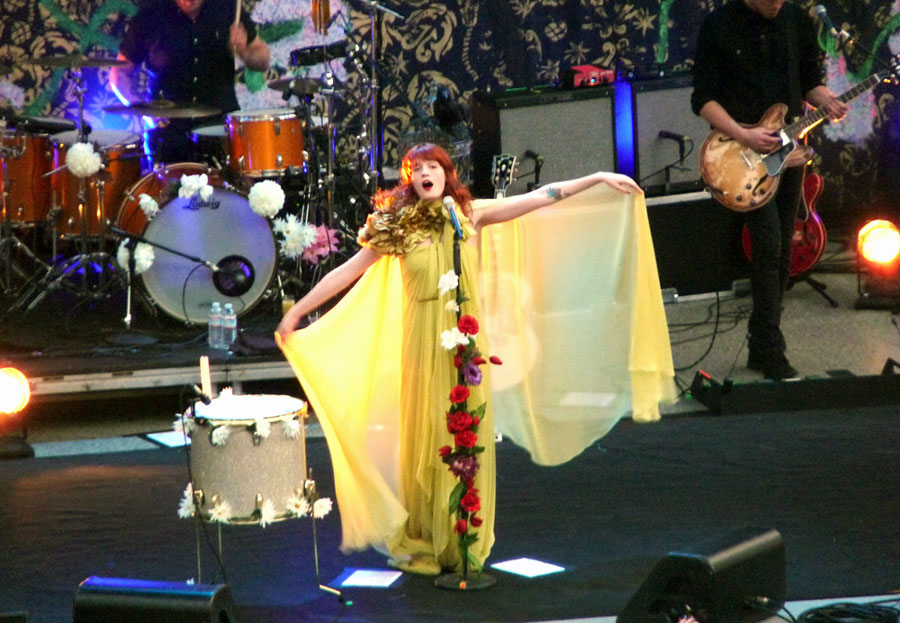
Florence and the Machine performing live at the Hearst Greek Theatre on the Lungs Tour, 2011

Florence and the Machine won the Critic's Choice Award at the 2009 Brit Awards after coming third in the BBC's Sound of 2009 poll. As well as attention from the BBC, the band received significant support from NME magazine, who included them on their annual Shockwaves NME Awards Tour for 2009, along with Glasvegas, Friendly Fires and White Lies.

The Sunday Times described Welch as "the most peculiar and most highly acclaimed female singer of the moment" and "the latest in a line of great English pop eccentrics". AllMusic referred to Lungs as "one of the most musically mature and emotionally mesmerising albums of 2009". Spin magazine rated Lungs (2009) eight out of ten and wrote, "You've gotta hand it to the girl: She always makes you feel something." The magazine named it the eighth best album of 2009. In December 2010, Florence and the Machine appeared on one of Spin's three holiday issue covers as Artist of the Year.

Florence and the Machine won the Mastercard British Album award for Lungs at the 2010 Brit Awards, having also been nominated for British Female Solo Artist and British Breakthrough Act. On 19 February 2010, Florence and the Machine won Best International Band at the 2010 Meteor Awards. The group led the nominations for the 2010 MOJO Awards, with four nods. They received a nomination for Best New Artist at the 53rd Annual Grammy Awards. In April 2011, Florence and the Machine were ranked 50 in the 2011 Time 100 poll, which annually lists the 100 most influential people in the world. American recording artist Beyoncé cited Florence and the Machine as an influence for her 2011 album 4.

== Band members ==
=== Current ===
- Florence Welch – lead vocals, percussion, occasional piano (2007–present)
- Isabella Summers – keyboards, backing vocals (2007–present) (Note: Summers did not participate in writing or producing Dance Fever (2022) and did not join the band for the Dance Fever Tour, but said that she was still a member in November 2022 and January 2023. Reporting on the band's 2025 album Everybody Scream also listed her as an official member.)
- Tom Monger – harp, percussion, backing vocals (2007–present)
- Cyrus Bayandor – bass (2018–present)
- Aku Orraca-Tetteh – keyboards, percussion, backing vocals (2018–present)
- Cian Hanley – drums, percussion (2025–present)
- Harry Fausing Smith – guitar, violin, saxophone (2025–present)

=== Former ===
- Christopher Lloyd Hayden – drums, percussion, backing vocals, rhythm guitar (2007–2018)
- Mark Saunders – bass, backing vocals (2009–2018)
- Rusty Bradshaw – keyboards, rhythm guitar, backing vocals (2011–2018)
- Hazel Mills – keyboards, backing vocals (2018–2022)
- Sam Doyle – drums (2022)
- Robert Ackroyd – lead guitar, backing vocals, bass (2007–2024)
- Dionne Douglas – violin, backing vocals, rhythm guitar (2018–2024)
- Loren Humphrey – drums (2018–2022, 2022–2024)

== Discography ==
- Lungs (2009)
- Ceremonials (2011)
- How Big, How Blue, How Beautiful (2015)
- High as Hope (2018)
- Dance Fever (2022)
- Everybody Scream (2025)

== Concert tours ==
- Lungs Tour (2008–2011)
- Ceremonials Tour (2011–2012)
- How Big, How Blue, How Beautiful Tour (2015–2016)
- High as Hope Tour (2018–2019)
- Dance Fever Tour (2022–2023)
- Everybody Scream Tour (2026)
