= Everybody Scream (song) =

Single by Florence and the Machine

from the album Everybody Scream
- Released: 20 August 2025
- Genre: Indie rock; chamber pop; folk rock
- Length: 4:04
- Label: Polydor
- Songwriters: Mark Bowen; Mitski Miyawaki; Florence Welch
- Producers: Mark Bowen; Aaron Dessner; James Ford; Florence Welch

Florence and the Machine singles chronology
"Free" (2022)	"Everybody Scream" (2025)	"One of the Greats" (2025)

Music video
- "Everybody Scream" music video on YouTube

"Everybody Scream" is a song by English indie rock band Florence and the Machine which was released on 20 August 2025 by Polydor Records as the lead single and title track from their sixth studio album, Everybody Scream. It was written by frontwoman Florence Welch alongside Mark Bowen and Mitski, with the former two producing the track with Aaron Dessner and James Ford. It is the band's first single since "Free" from their fifth album, Dance Fever.

== Background ==
Florence and the Machine announced their sixth studio album, Everybody Scream, on 19 August 2025. The title track was released the following day as the album's lead single.

== Lyrics and composition ==
Like its parent album, the song is inspired by themes of mystery, madness, witchcraft, poetry, folk horror, and mysticism, and sees Welch comparing her life as a rock star with that of a cult leader, stating in the chorus, “Look at me run myself ragged / Blood on the stage / But how can I leave you when you screaming my name?”, with some critics noting the song's lyrical references to the Satanic panic.

The song also explores the physical and emotional cost of surrendering yourself to something else, with Welch reckoning with the ecstasy and agony of her life as a performer through the use of dark imagery. Of this theme, Welch explained, “There’s always a bit of me that wants to keep hiding—like, ‘No no no, I’m not ready, put it off,’. This time, I challenged myself to not delay a record. I was like, ‘Just move through the fear and put it out.’ The song itself is about the pull back to the stage and why I always keep going back there, even though every time it takes a little bit more from me.”

It is played in the trailer for Maggie Gyllenhaal's film The Bride! (2026).

== Music video ==
The "Everybody Scream" music video was released on 20 August 2025 with the song itself. Directed by Autumn de Wilde, it features Welch in a red dress running through an eerie landscape alongside a group of four screaming women in black coats and hats. Once they reach a building, the women dance on the tables, seemingly causing the inhabitants to become possessed and shake uncontrollably. Co-writer and co-producer Mark Bowen makes a cameo appearance as one of the possessed men. The video ends with Welch and the women outside on a wooden platform, with the women grabbing her by the throat and causing her to scream.

== Live performances ==
"Everybody Scream" received its live debut on The Graham Norton Show on 17 October 2025, with Welch backed by a choir in a dramatically-lit set. It was later performed on Later... with Jools Holland on 2 November 2025.

== Media usage ==
The song has been used in trailers for the 2026 film The Bride!

== Charts ==
=== Weekly charts ===
Weekly chart performance for "Everybody Scream"
Chart (2025)	Peak position
Canada Mainstream Rock (Billboard Canada)	28
Canada Modern Rock (Billboard Canada)	11
Ireland (IRMA)	77
Japan Hot Overseas (Billboard Japan)	14
New Zealand Hot Singles (RMNZ)	13
UK Singles (Official Charts)	57
US Hot Rock & Alternative Songs (Billboard)	30
US Rock & Alternative Airplay (Billboard)	11

=== Year-end charts ===
Year-end chart performance for "Everybody Scream"
Chart (2025)	Position
Canada Modern Rock (Billboard)	85
