= Dance Fever Tour =

2022–23 concert tour by Florence and the Machine

- Tour by Florence and the Machine
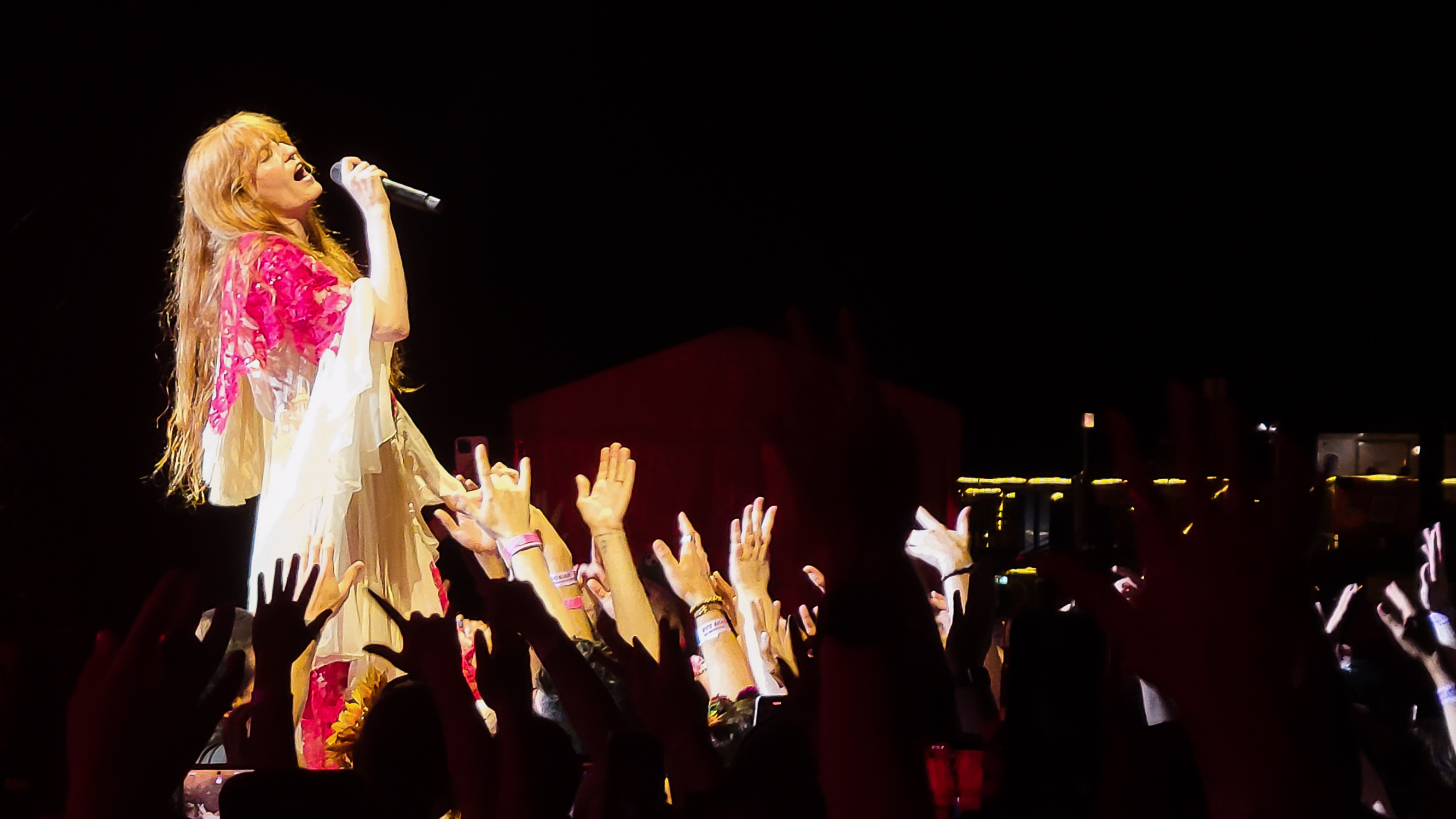
- Florence and the Machine performing during the Dance Fever Tour in Chicago
- Location: Europe; North America; Oceania; South America
- Associated album: Dance Fever
- Start date: 15 April 2022
- End date: 2 September 2023
- Legs: 7
- Supporting acts: Aziya; Ethel Cain; Noga Erez; Mykki Blanco; Griff; Hope Tala; Willie J Healey; Japanese Breakfast; King Princess; Arlo Parks; Yves Tumor; Wet Leg

Florence and the Machine concert chronology
- High as Hope Tour (2018–19); Dance Fever Tour (2022–23); Everybody Scream Tour (2026)

The Dance Fever Tour was the fifth concert tour by the English indie rock band Florence and the Machine. The tour was in support of the band's fifth studio album Dance Fever (2022), and visited North America, Europe and Oceania. The tour began on 15 April 2022 at Newcastle City Hall in Newcastle upon Tyne, England, and concluded on 2 September 2023 in Mijas, Spain.

== Set list ==
This set list is taken from the 28 January show at The O2 Arena in London. It does not represent all concerts during the tour. During festival dates, the set list was often shortened.

1. Heaven Is Here
2. King
3. Ship to Wreck
4. Free
5. Daffodil
6. Dog Days Are Over
7. Girls Against God
8. Dream Girl Evil
9. Prayer Factory
10. Big God
11. What Kind of Man
12. Morning Elvis
13. June
14. Hunger
15. You've Got the Love
16. Choreomania
17. Kiss with a Fist
18. Cosmic Love
19. My Love
20. Restraint
21. Never Let Me Go
22. Shake It Out
23. Rabbit Heart (Raise It Up)

== Tour dates ==
List of 2022 concerts, showing date, city, country, and venue
Date	City	Country	Venue
15 April 2022	Newcastle	England	Newcastle City Hall
16 April 2022	Blackburn	England	King George's Hall
19 April 2022	London	England	Theatre Royal Drury Lane
29 April 2022	Los Angeles	United States	Los Angeles Theatre
6 May 2022	New York City	United States	Alice Tully Hall
4 June 2022 (Note: Part of Orange Warsaw Festival.)	Warsaw	Poland	Sluzewiec Horse Racing Track
9 June 2022 (Note: Part of Rosendal Garden Party.)	Stockholm	Sweden	Rosendals Tradgard
10 June 2022 (Note: Part of Tempelhof Sounds.)	Berlin	Germany	Tempelhof Airport
25 June 2022 (Note: Part of Werchter Boutique.)	Werchter	Belgium	Festivalpark
7 July 2022 (Note: Part of NOS Alive.)	Oeiras	Portugal	Passeio Marítimo de Algés
9 July 2022 (Note: Part of Mad Cool Festival.)	Madrid	Spain	Valdebebas
12 August 2022 (Note: Part of Øyafestivalen.)	Oslo	Norway	Tøyenparken
13 August 2022 (Note: Part of Flow Festival.)	Helsinki	Finland	Suvilahti
2 September 2022	Laval	Canada	Place Bell
3 September 2022	Toronto	Canada	Budweiser Stage
7 September 2022	Chicago	United States	Huntington Bank Pavilion
8 September 2022	Saint Paul	United States	The Theater at Xcel Energy Center
10 September 2022	Clarkston	United States	Pine Knob Music Theatre
12 September 2022	Washington, D.C.	United States	Capital One Arena
14 September 2022	Boston	United States	TD Garden
16 September 2022	New York City	United States	Madison Square Garden
17 September 2022	New York City	United States	Madison Square Garden
20 September 2022	Nashville	United States	Ascend Amphitheater
21 September 2022	Alpharetta	United States	Ameris Bank Amphitheatre
23 September 2022	Orlando	United States	Amway Center
24 September 2022	Miami	United States	FTX Arena
27 September 2022	Austin	United States	Moody Center
28 September 2022	Irving	United States	The Pavilion at Toyota Music Factory
1 October 2022	Denver	United States	Ball Arena
4 October 2022	Vancouver	Canada	Rogers Arena
6 October 2022	Seattle	United States	Climate Pledge Arena
7 October 2022	Portland	United States	Theater of the Clouds
9 October 2022	Mountain View	United States	Shoreline Amphitheatre
12 October 2022	San Diego	United States	CalCoast Credit Union Open Air Theatre
14 October 2022	Los Angeles	United States	Hollywood Bowl
15 October 2022	Los Angeles	United States	Hollywood Bowl
14 November 2022	Paris	France	Accor Arena
16 November 2022	Cardiff	Wales	Cardiff International Arena
18 November 2022	London	England	The O_{2} Arena

List of 2023 concerts, showing date, city, country, and venue
Date	City	Country	Venue
28 January 2023 (Note: The concerts in United Kingdom and Ireland on 28 January–8 February 2023 were originally scheduled for 19–30 November 2022, but they were rescheduled due to Florence Welch foot injury.)	London	England	The O_{2} Arena
29 January 2023	Birmingham	England	Resorts World Arena
31 January 2023	Nottingham	England	Motorpoint Arena
1 February 2023	Glasgow	Scotland	OVO Hydro
3 February 2023	Manchester	England	AO Arena
4 February 2023	Leeds	England	First Direct Arena
6 February 2023	Bournemouth	England	Windsor Hall
8 February 2023	Dublin	Ireland	3Arena
4 March 2023	Perth	Australia	RAC Arena
8 March 2023	Melbourne	Australia	Rod Laver Arena
9 March 2023	Melbourne	Australia	Rod Laver Arena
11 March 2023 (Note: Part of WOMAdelaide Festival.)	Adelaide	Australia	Botanic Park
13 March 2023	Sydney	Australia	Qudos Bank Arena
17 March 2023	Brisbane	Australia	Brisbane Entertainment Centre
18 March 2023 (Note: Part of A Day at the Green.)	Mount Cotton	Australia	Sirromet Winery
21 March 2023	Auckland	New Zealand	Spark Arena
May 28, 2023 (Note: Part of MITA Festival.)	Rio de Janeiro	Brazil	Jockey Clube
June 4, 2023	São Paulo	Brazil	Anhangabaú Valley
16 June 2023 (Note: Part of Lido Sounds.)	Linz	Austria	Donauufer Urfahrmarkt
18 June 2023	Pula	Croatia	Pula Arena
22 June 2023 (Note: Part of I-Days Festival.)	Milan	Italy	Ippodromo SNAI
26 June 2023	Cork	Ireland	Musgrave Park
27 June 2023	Malahide	Ireland	Malahide Castle
28 June 2023	Belfast	Ireland	Ormeau Park
2 July 2023 (Note: Part of EJEKT Festival.)	Athens	Greece	Plateia Nerou
6 July 2023 (Note: Part of BBK Live.)	Bilbao	Spain	Kobetamendi
8 July 2023 (Note: Part of South Ocean Festival.)	Malmö	Sweden	Sibbarp Field
10 August 2023 (Note: Part of Sziget Festival.)	Budapest	Hungary	Óbudai-sziget
11 August 2023 (Note: Part of Summer Well Festival.)	Buftea	Romania	Ştirbei Domain
13 August 2023 (Note: Part of Boardmasters Festival.)	Newquay	England	Fistral Beach and Watergate Bay
1 September 2023 (Note: Part of MEO Kalorama.)	Lisbon	Portugal	Parque de Bela Vista
2 September 2023 (Note: Part of Cala Mijas Festival.)	Mijas	Spain	Costa del Sol
