= Free (Florence and the Machine song) =

2022 single by Florence and the Machine

Single by Florence and the Machine

from the album Dance Fever
- Released: 20 April 2022
- Genre: Synth-rock
- Length: 3:54
- Label: Polydor
- Songwriters: Florence Welch; Jack Antonoff
- Producers: Florence Welch; Jack Antonoff

Florence and the Machine singles chronology
"My Love" (2022)	"Free" (2022)	"Everybody Scream" (2025)

Music video
- "Free" on YouTube

"Free" is a song by English indie rock band Florence and the Machine. It was released on 20 April 2022 as the fourth single from the band's fifth studio album, Dance Fever (2022) through the record label Polydor Records. "Free" was written and produced by Florence Welch and Jack Antonoff. "Free" lyrically discusses the singer's problems with anxiety and psychological trauma. She has said it was the last song she wrote before the first lockdown of the COVID-19 pandemic.

A music video for the song directed by American director Autumn de Wilde was filmed in Kyiv, Ukraine in November 2021 and was released on 20 April 2022. It stars British actor Bill Nighy who portrays the singer's anxiety and features the two next to each other portraying the emotions the song discusses. It received positive comments from critics who lauded the storyline.

== Background and release ==
During an interview with Apple Music, Welch described the process of conception of the song: "Ironically, 'Free' was actually the last song I wrote before the first lockdown[...] It's a song about my anxiety and how I process it and this feeling that it's just something that's been with me my whole life, and even as my life stabilizes ... when I'm playing or I'm making music or I'm in the flow of creativity [the anxiety] goes away, so it's kind of this push-and-pull throughout the song of the anxiety, and then taking it out of the way and dancing and feeling free." The song premiered on BBC Radio 1's Future Sounds on 21 April 2022.

The single was released through the band's record label Polydor Records digitally on 20 April 2022. A remix made by American DJ The Blessed Madonna was also made available for sale.

== Composition ==
"Free" is a pop song which contains an "urgent" sound that is primarily driven by synths-and-guitar. Music critic Neil Z. Yeung of AllMusic musically described its sound as "Antonoff's band Bleachers taking on an early-aughts Bloc Party or Strokes number". Lyrically, the song describes a protagonist who is feeling "overwhelmed" by the outside world and describes Welch's experience of finding freedom in her music. It was musically compared to the band's earlier singles "Dog Days Are Over" (2008) and "Shake it Out" (2011).

== Reception ==
=== Critical reception ===
Upon its release, the song was lauded for its "anthemic" character and "exhilarating" feeling by Emma Sanchez from Variance magazine.

=== Commercial performance ===
On the UK Singles Chart, "Free" debuted and peaked at number 66 for the week ending 29 April 2022. "Free" peaked at number 66 on the Irish Singles Chart in June 2023.

== Music video ==
The music video filmed for the song was directed by American director Autumn de Wilde and was released on 20 April 2022 on the band's official YouTube channel. It was filmed on 18 November 2021 in Kyiv, the capital of Ukraine. The choreography for the clip was invented by Ryan Heffington, who also dances in the video.

Katerina Konovalova was responsible for the Ukrainian folk art that can be seen in the clip and Volodymyr Radlinskiy served as its production designer. As the release coincided with the 2022 Russian invasion of Ukraine, Welch dedicated the music video for "Free" to Ukrainian people.

=== Synopsis ===
The video opens with Florence Welch starring as herself and British actor Bill Nighy starring as "her anxiety". In the first part, Welch is seen donning a red dress. In the first half of the video, the two are seen sitting next to each other in a banquet hall surrounded by white walls and large windows. As the song progresses, the duo is seen in various scenes and settings; they are standing next to each other, with Nighy scrolling and speaking on her phone, drinking a cup of coffee, driving a car, activities meant to portray the singer "grappling with her mental health". During one scene, she can also be seen being carried into a room at the hospital by two male nurses portrayed by choreographer Ryan Heffington and Alexander Antofiy.

In the video's second half, Welch can be seen outdoors against a "sun-streaked winter landscape" which is then shifted to Welch singing against a white and gray backdrop, with Nighy in the background. Interspersed throughout the clip are instances of Welch dancing and jumping around. In the last few scenes, Welsh can be seen crawling on the table, standing against a landscape and posing as the wind blows in the background. The video ends off with a note that says "Dedicated to the spirit, creativity and perseverance of our brave Ukrainian friends. Filmed in Kyiv on 18 November 2021 with Ukrainian filmmakers and artists, whose radiant freedom can never be extinguished."

=== Reception ===
Hilary Remley of Collider observed that De Wilde's work "expresses the emotions that the music itself stirs, without the explicit need of exact recreation". Interpreting the story line, she viewed it as an "exploration of anxiety and overwhelming emotions coming to the question of how we bear it all". Emma Sanchez of Variance magazine called it "a beautiful, whirlwind visual for an equally spectacular, exhilarating song about coming out on the other side of a struggle". Conseuqence interpreted the activities that Nighy performs in the video as similar to how other people also deal with their feelings of anxiety and viewed Welch's dancing as her "means of melting away anxiety". Kate Brayden of Hot Press praised the "humorous visuals, with gorgeous landscape shots". Kasper Hermans writing for the Dutch Nieuweplaat magazine felt the clip was fitting for the "free, lightly euphoric feeling" that the song conveys. As of July 2022, the clip has been watched more than 5.8 million views on YouTube.

== Live performances ==
The song was performed live by the band during a warm-up concert at a warm-up show in New York City. On 20 May 2022, the band appeared on BBC One's The One Show where they performed "Free". The same month, they also performed a televised appearance of the song at Audacy Live. On 3 June 2022, the band appeared at SiriusXM where they performed the song along with "My Love". On 18 June 2022, the song was performed on Later with Jools Holland.

== Track listings ==
- Digital download/streaming
1. "Free" – 3:54
- Digital download/streaming (remix)
1. "Free" (The Blessed Madonna Remix) – 4:24

== Charts ==
Chart performance for "Free"
Chart (2022–2023)	Peak position
Canada Rock (Billboard)	16
Ireland (IRMA)	66
UK Singles Sales (Official Charts Company)	66
US Hot Rock & Alternative Songs (Billboard)	27

== Certifications ==
Region	Certification	Certified units/sales
Brazil (Pro-Música Brasil)	Gold	20,000^{‡}
United Kingdom (BPI)	Silver	200,000^{‡}
^{‡} Sales+streaming figures based on certification alone.
