= King (Florence and the Machine song) =

Single by Florence and the Machine

from the album Dance Fever
- Released: 23 February 2022
- Genre: Pop rock
- Length: 4:40
- Label: Polydor
- Songwriters: Florence Welch; Jack Antonoff
- Producers: Florence Welch; Jack Antonoff

Florence and the Machine singles chronology
"Call Me Cruella" (2021)	"King" (2022)	"My Love" (2022)

Music video
- "King" on YouTube

"King" is a song by English indie rock band Florence and the Machine from their fifth studio album, Dance Fever (2022). It was released on 23 February 2022 by Polydor Records. The song was written and produced by Florence Welch and Jack Antonoff. A pop rock ballad with a strong bassline, the song discusses Welch's conflict in choosing between her career and starting a family as well as gender expectations for women in society.

"King" was praised by music critics for its themes and composition, with some of them calling it a career highlight. Autumn de Wilde directed the music video for "King", which was shot in Ukraine, and stars Welch, Jack Riddiford, Alexander Antofiy, backup dancers, and an orchestra. The song was nominated for Best Alternative Music Performance at the 65th Annual Grammy Awards.

== Background and release ==
On 21 February 2022, the band's fans received a medieval-styled tarot card in the mail that featured a photo of Florence Welch dressed in period clothing. The card had the word "King" on it, and each envelope was inscribed with "Florence + the Machine – Chapter 1" along its back. That same day, digital billboards began popping up around London that featured the same picture of Welch that was printed on the card. The band's website was also updated with fifteen tarot cards, the first of which featured the mailer's design. "King" was digitally released on 23 February 2022, as Dance Fever's lead single.

== Composition ==
"King" was described by music critics as a pop rock ballad. The track begins with restrained vocals, and minimal instrumentation over a strong bassline. At the three-minute mark, the song reaches an orchestral crescendo. This was described as a "monumental drum break [...] followed by the thunderous impact of her band piling in".

The song's lyrics focus on Welch's examination of her inner conflict between art and starting a family. In an April 2022 interview with Vogue, Welch describes these struggles: "The whole crux of the song is that you're torn between the two. The thing I've always been sure of is my work, but I do start to feel this shifting of priorities, this sense of, like, maybe I want something different." The sacrifices which women have to make when choosing between families and their careers is a core theme of the track. On the song's hook, Welch repeats the refrain "I am no mother. I am no bride. I am king."

Welch, in 2025, admitted the line "i never knew my killer would be coming from within," was haunting after suffering from a miscarriage, and that the pregnancy was ectopic during Dance Fever Tour. The fallopian tube had ruptured, resulting in massive internal haemorrhage that required emergency surgery. She said: "The closest I came to making life was the closest I came to death."

== Music video ==
The music video for "King" was directed by Autumn de Wilde and choreographed by Ryan Heffington, both of whom have collaborated with Florence and the Machine for their past music video releases. It was released on the same day as the single on the band's YouTube channel. The video was partially shot on location in Ukraine, shortly before Russia's invasion in February 2022, with production being handled by Anonymous Content and Radioaktive Film. Jamie Feliu-Torres served as the music video's cinematographer, while visual effects were produced by Denis Reva and Framestore.

The video depicts Welch floating around "draped in royal purple robes, as she unseats and cracks the neck of a J. Crew-looking king", played by English actor Jack Riddiford. Welch's character is flanked by courtiers, billed as "Lace Monsters", that "dance behind her and whirl in jubilation while the orchestra [credited as the "Ghost Orchestra"] floats in suspended animation." Alexander Antofiy also stars as "The Henchman", a mysterious character who seemingly facilitates some of the actions taken by Welch's character. According to Welch, while producing Dance Fever, she would project horror films onto the wall, which served as inspiration for songs like "King".

In an interview with CBS News on 13 May 2022, following the Russian invasion, Welch confirmed that all the actors were safe.

== Critical reception ==
Both the song and its music video were well received by critics, who praised its themes and composition. Elise Soutar, in a review for Paste, favorably compared the song's gradual build-up to Florence + the Machine's output on High as Hope. In a Gigwise review of Dance Fever, Lucy Harbron praised "King", and called it one the band's best songs.

Hannah Dailey of Billboard said that "the video is as dynamic as the song, which moves between soft, pensive moments and roaring, anthemic releases." Matt Moen, writing for Paper, described the video as "Suspira [sic] mixed-with-The Craft". Writing for The Guardian, Michael Cragg ranked "King" as the band's twelfth best song. Grazia magazine called the song "the feminist anthem of 2022." In an album review, Neil Z. Yeung writing for AllMusic, highlighted "King" as one of the songs that offer "some of the strongest lyrics and personal insight on the album". Writing for The Daily Telegraph, "[p]roclaiming the male regal title sounds at once transgressive and joyously funny".

"King" won the Ivor Novello Award for Best Song Musically and Lyrically at The Ivors in London on Thursday 18 May 2023.

== Charts ==
Chart performance for "King"
Chart (2022)	Peak position
Ireland (IRMA)	37
New Zealand Hot Singles (RMNZ)	11
UK Singles (Official Charts)	54
US Hot Rock & Alternative Songs (Billboard)	21

== Certifications ==
Region	Certification	Certified units/sales
Brazil (Pro-Música Brasil)	Gold	20,000^{‡}
^{‡} Sales+streaming figures based on certification alone.
