= Florida!!! =

2024 song by Taylor Swift

Song by Taylor Swift featuring Florence and the Machine

from the album The Tortured Poets Department
- Released: April 19, 2024
- Studio: Conway Recording (Los Angeles); Electric Lady (New York); Esplanade (New Orleans); Miloco (London)
- Genre: Power ballad
- Length: 3:35
- Label: Republic
- Songwriters: Taylor Swift; Florence Welch
- Producers: Taylor Swift; Jack Antonoff

Lyric video
- "Florida!!!" on YouTube

"Florida!!!" is a song by the American singer-songwriter Taylor Swift featuring the English band Florence and the Machine. The song is from Swift's eleventh studio album, The Tortured Poets Department (2024). She wrote the track with the band's lead vocalist Florence Welch, who also duetted with her. The song was produced by Swift and Jack Antonoff.

"Florida!!!" is a power ballad with elements of pop, Americana, indie rock, and arena rock. Its production incorporates a mix of guitars and loud drums. The lyrics display influences of Southern Gothic and melodrama and address themes of escapism, alcoholism, and drugs: they are about escaping to Destin, Florida to create a new identity, as a means to relinquish wrongdoings and unpleasant circumstances.

Critics generally praised the duo's vocal performance and the song's production, although some deemed the lyrics lackluster. The song peaked at number eight on the Billboard Global 200 and reached the top 10 in Australia, Canada, New Zealand, and the United States. Swift performed "Florida!!!" live with Florence and the Machine at one London show and three Miami shows of the Eras Tour in 2024.

== Background and release ==
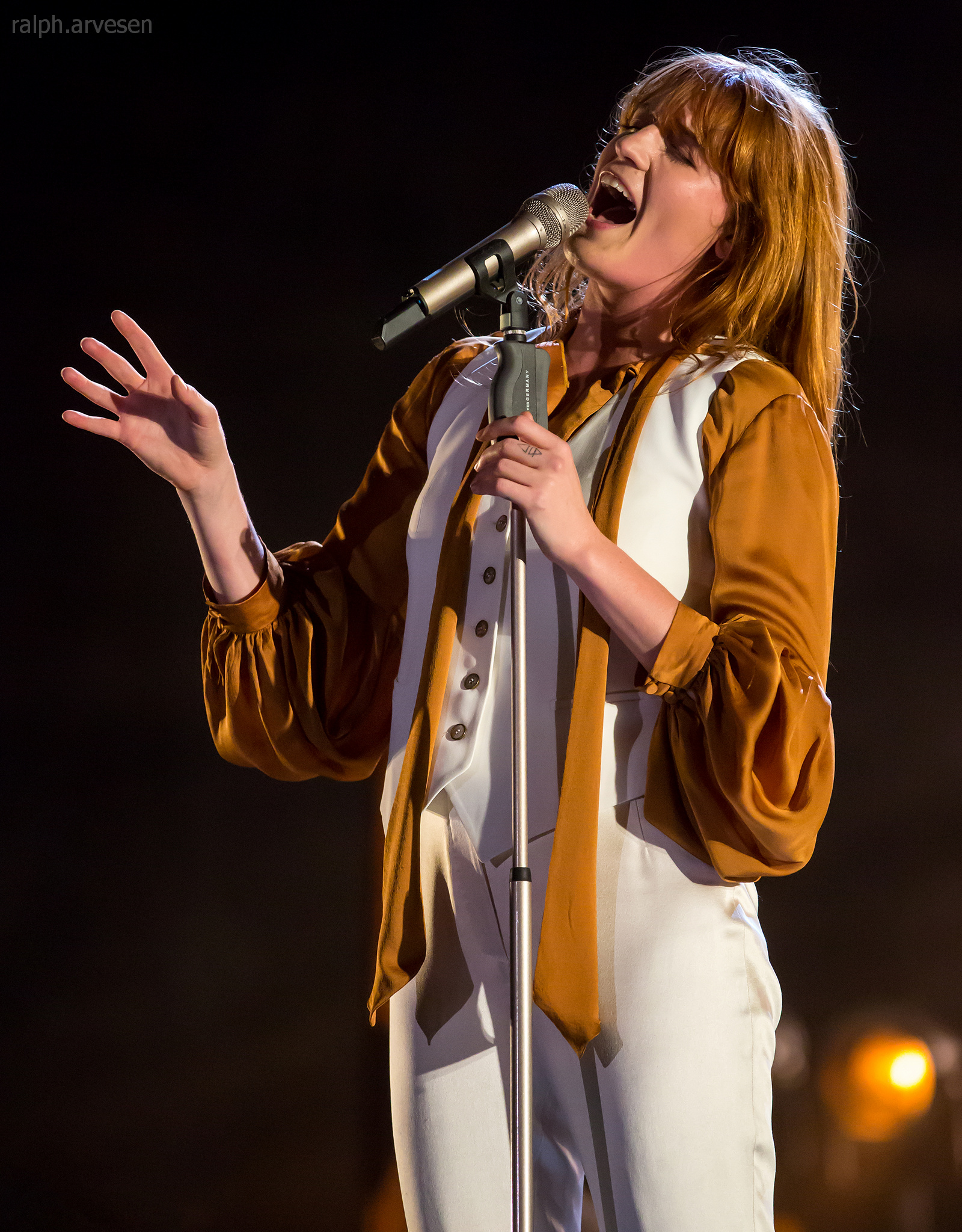
Florence Welch co-wrote "Florida!!!" and duets with Swift in the song.

Taylor Swift started working on The Tortured Poets Department immediately after submitting Midnights to Republic Records for release in 2022, and continued working on it in secrecy throughout the US leg of the Eras Tour in 2023. Conceived amidst heightened fame brought by touring and publicized personal relationships, The Tortured Poets Department was a "lifeline" to Swift, who described it as an album she "really needed" to make. Republic Records released The Tortured Poets Department on April 19, 2024.

"Florida!!!" is the eighth track on the album. It features vocals from Florence Welch, the lead vocalist of the English band Florence and the Machine. Swift shared with iHeartRadio that the inspiration behind "Florida!!!" came from the series Dateline NBC. In the interview, she drew a parallel between people who flee to Florida after committing crimes and those dealing with heartbreak: "They try to reinvent themselves, have a new identity, blend in." Welch told British Vogue that Swift approached her with "a concept and a story", which was her "favourite way to start songwriting". The actress Emma Stone was credited for the "oddities" in the track, according to the album's liner notes.

Swift performed "Florida!!!" with Welch at the eighth and final London concert of the Eras Tour on August 20, 2024; it was the song's first live performance. The track was added to the setlist between renditions of "So High School" and "Who's Afraid of Little Old Me?", being accompanied by a choreography. Swift and Welch performed the song again during the Eras Tour's three Miami concerts from October 18 through October 20, 2024.

== Music ==
Swift wrote "Florida!!!" with Welch and produced it with Jack Antonoff. It is a power ballad with an uptempo production drawing from pop and Americana. Its production is accompanied by insistent programming that build up in the verses, before cascading into a dynamic refrain composed of power chords, accentuated by jarring, booming drums over a soft synth backing. The instrumentation consists of a mix of drums and guitars that evoke 2010s indie rock and arena rock. Swift sings the first verse, Welch sings the second, and the two duet later in the track, resulting in vocal harmonies.

Several critics described the loud drums in the chorus as theatrical and cinematic, and the overall soundscape as gloomy, bleak, but also anthemic. The music critic Annie Zaleski described the drums as "thunderclap", while Billboard's Jason Lipshutz wrote that they "crash down like lightning strikes". Laura Snapes of The Guardian thought that the "desolate Americana" of the song was influenced by the music of Lana Del Rey. Erica Gonzales of Elle added that the sound brought an "anthemic and at times euphoric feel", reminiscent of Welch's music, and Maria Sherman of the Associated Press thought that the 2010s indie rock nostalgia evokes Sufjan Stevens's album Illinois.

== Lyrics and interpretations ==
The lyrics of "Florida!!!" contain influences of Southern Gothic melodrama. With escapism as its main theme, the song is about embarking on a therapeutic journey to relinquish unpleasant experiences and circumstances. Swift's character details her surroundings that drive her insane: she is sick of her friends who smell like "weed or little babies" and fantasizes about buying a timeshare in Destin, Florida, where she would have a chance to create a new identity. Welch's character dreams of indulging in alcohol and murdering her ex-lovers and "cheating husbands" before throwing their bodies into a swamp. The refrain characterizes Florida as a narcotic experience that could "fuck up" one's psyche: "It's one hell of a drug."

The lyrics reference many common perceptions of Florida as a state of weirdness and contradictions: beautiful and brutal, hurricanes, swamps, drugs, crimes, sunshine, and vacation getaways. Multiple analyses compared the theme of murdering cheating lovers to that of Swift's 2020 song "No Body, No Crime". According to Notion's Rachel Martin, the song is based on Swift's and Welch's stream-of-consciousness writing. Bryan West, writing for The Tennessean, contended that "Florida!!!" is a thematic continuation of its preceding track on The Tortured Poets Department, "Fresh Out the Slammer": after escaping from a relationship that made her feel imprisoned, Swift's character flees to Florida and towards a new relationship. Bryan also compared the escapist theme to that of Swift's 2017 song "Getaway Car". Zaleski added that the narrative resembled the film Thelma & Louise.

== Critical reception ==
"Florida!!!" received generally positive reviews from critics. It was selected as one of the album's best tracks in a multitude of reviews. In a positive review by Melissa Ruggieri of USA Today, Swift and Welch's vocals against stomping instrumentals made the song "cinematic and purposeful." The Independent's Helen Brown also praised Welch's vocals. Lipshutz ranked the song third against the album's sixteen tracks, commending Swift's emotional vocals and the brash sound. Gonzales also said the song brought an "infectious energy" with its blasting drums during the chorus. Alex Gonzalez of Uproxx thought that the song was both bold and timeless, and Pitchfork's Shaad D'Souza deemed it the boldest and most energetic song, making it stand out from a mostly contemplative and subdued album.

P. Claire Dodson from Teen Vogue said the drums and percussive instrumentals were exciting, adding that "Florida!!!" showcased Swift's venturing out of her "comfort zone". Vogue Australia's Nina Miyashita and Jonah Waterhouse called it a "fun, tongue-in-cheek track". Writing for The Hollywood Reporter, Mesfin Fedaku praised the song and performance by Florence and the Machine, calling it a "winning track", Ludovic Hunter-Tilney of the Financial Times called the song "punchy". Writing for The Nightly, Jay Hanna said the collaboration lives up to all expectations. Chris Willman of Variety called it the "funniest track" from the album, referring to the lines "My friends all smell like weed or little babies" and "Fuck me up, Florida".

In less enthusiastic reviews, John Wohlmacher of Beats Per Minute wrote that the track's blasting drums during its chorus disguise its substance-lacking verses and deemed it "more plodding than memorable." The Line of Best Fit's Paul Bridgewater said "Florida!!!" comes close to being a standout track, especially with the collaboration with Welch. However, he said that Welch's voice "jars a little" with Swift's. Stereogum's Tom Breihan said the track had "lot of half-baked Bible-belt imagery" undeserving of the exclamation points in its title. Paste criticized the lyrical content, saying Welch's verse was "grossly watery" and the chorus was the worst of 2024. Also from Paste, in a post-review article published one week after the album's release, Grace Byron remarked that while the song does not live up to the artistry or impact of a song by Welch, it was "more sonically interesting".

== Commercial performance ==
Upon the album's release, its tracks occupied the top 14 of the US Billboard Hot 100; "Florida!!!" opened at its peak of number eight on the chart, where Swift became the first artist to monopolize the top 14. The song also became Florence and the Machine's first top-10 entry and Welch's second following "Sweet Nothing" (2012) with Calvin Harris. In Canada, it peaked at number nine on the Canadian Hot 100.

Outside of North America, "Florida!!!", along with tracks from the album, occupied the top nine of the Billboard Global 200; the song debuted and peaked at number seven on the chart, where it became Swift's 33rd top-10 entry and Florence and the Machine's first. In Australia and New Zealand, the song reached number seven on the ARIA Singles Chart and number nine on the Official New Zealand Music Chart. On the former chart, it made Swift the artist with the most entries in a single week with 29 and marked Florence and the Machine's second top-10 entry after "Spectrum (Say My Name)" (2012). Elsewhere, "Florida!!!" charted within the top 25 in Singapore (12), Ireland (13), Luxembourg (18), Portugal (18), Malaysia (20), South Africa (22), and the Philippines (23).

== Personnel ==
Credits are adapted from the liner notes of The Tortured Poets Department.

- Taylor Swift – vocals, songwriter, producer
- Florence Welch – vocals, songwriter, drums, piano, percussion
- Jack Antonoff – producer, bass, cello, drums, acoustic guitar, electric guitar, piano, programming, Juno, M1, Mellotron
- Emily Jean Stone – oddities
- Serban Ghenea – mixing
- Ben Loveland – recording engineer
- Laura Sisk – recording engineer
- Oli Jacobs – recording engineer
- Bryce Bordone – mix engineer
- Randy Merrill – mastering
- Ryan Smith – mastering for vinyl

== Charts ==
Chart performance
Chart (2024)	Peak position
Argentina Hot 100 (Billboard)	91
Australia (ARIA)	8
Belgium (Ultratop 50 Flanders)	36
Brazil Hot 100 (Billboard)	62
Canada Hot 100 (Billboard)	9
Czech Republic Singles Digital (ČNS IFPI)	49
Denmark (Tracklisten)	33
France (SNEP)	80
Global 200 (Billboard)	8
Greece International (IFPI)	17
Lithuania (AGATA)	50
Luxembourg (Billboard)	18
Malaysia International (RIM)	20
New Zealand (Recorded Music NZ)	9
Philippines (Billboard)	23
Poland (Polish Streaming Top 100)	73
Portugal (AFP)	18
Singapore (RIAS)	12
Slovakia Singles Digital (ČNS IFPI)	61
South Africa (Billboard)	22
South Korea Download (Circle)	169
Spain (Promusicae)	60
Sweden (Sverigetopplistan)	33
Swiss Streaming (Schweizer Hitparade)	19
UAE (IFPI)	19
UK Singles Sales (OCC)	73
UK Streaming (OCC)	12
US Billboard Hot 100	8

== Certifications ==
Certifications for "Florida!!!"
Region	Certification	Certified units/sales
Australia (ARIA)	Platinum	70,000^{‡}
Brazil (Pro-Música Brasil)	2× Platinum	80,000^{‡}
New Zealand (RMNZ)	Gold	15,000^{‡}
United Kingdom (BPI)	Silver	200,000^{‡}
^{‡} Sales+streaming figures based on certification alone.
