= Florence Welch =

British singer (born 1986)

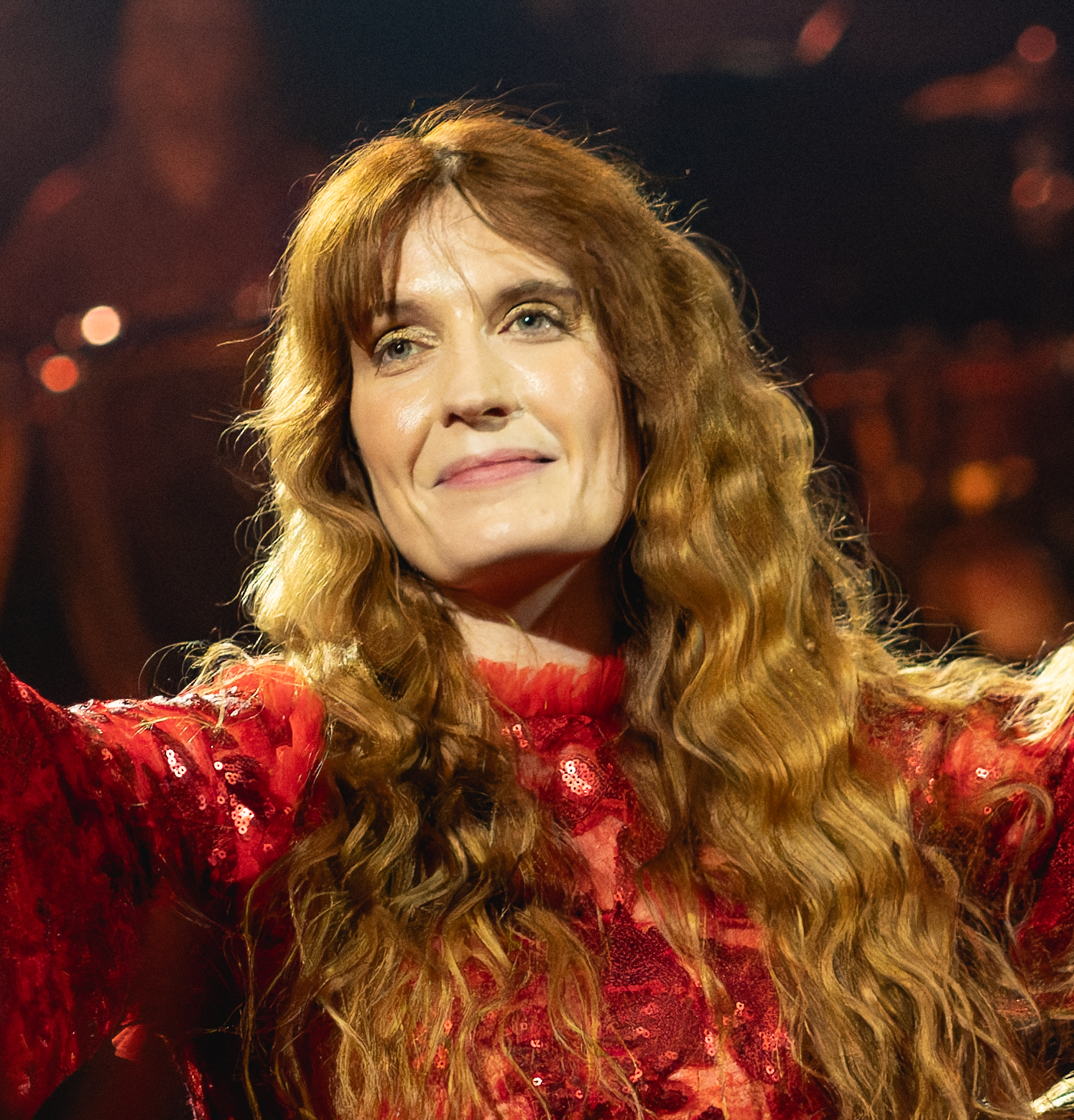
- Welch in 2024

Background information
- Born: Florence Leontine Mary Welch; 28 August 1986 (age 40); Camberwell, London, England
- Genres: Indie rock; indie pop; chamber pop; baroque pop; art pop; art rock; neo soul; folk
- Occupations: Singer; songwriter
- Years active: 2006–present
- Labels: Moshi Moshi; Iamsound; Island; Universal Republic; Republic; Virgin EMI; Polydor
- Member of: Florence and the Machine

Florence Leontine Mary Welch (born 28 August 1986) is an English singer. She is the lead vocalist and primary songwriter of the indie rock band Florence and the Machine. The band's debut studio album, Lungs (2009), topped the UK Albums Chart and won the Brit Award for Best British Album. Their next five albums also achieved chart success. In 2018, Welch released a book titled Useless Magic, a collection of lyrics and poems written by her, along with illustrations.

== Early life and education ==
Florence Leontine Mary Welch was born on 28 August 1986 in Camberwell, London, England, to Nick Russell Welch, an advertising executive and Evelyn Welch (née Samuels), an academic originally from the United States. Through her mother, Welch has both British and American citizenship. Her maternal grandfather was lawyer and coal magnate John S. Samuels III. Florence was raised as a Catholic.

Welch is the niece of satirist Craig Brown via Brown's wife and Welch's aunt, Frances Welch, and granddaughter of Colin Welch, former deputy editor of The Daily Telegraph and former Daily Mail parliamentary sketchwriter. Welch's maternal uncle is actor and filmmaker John Stockwell. She has a younger sister, Grace, who inspired Welch's song of the same name. Welch also has a younger brother named J.J. Welch's parents divorced when she was 13, and her mother eventually married their next-door neighbour, Peter Openshaw. As a result of the marriage, Welch has three step-siblings: Maddie, Sam, and John. Through her father, Welch also has a stepbrother named Nick. When Welch was 14, her maternal grandmother, who had bipolar disorder, died from suicide by jumping from her New York apartment.

During her youth, Welch was encouraged by her Scottish paternal grandmother, Cybil (née Russell), to pursue her performing and singing talents. Welch's deceased grandmothers inspired numerous songs on Florence and the Machine's debut album Lungs (2009). In her youth, Welch also sang at family weddings and funerals. Aged ten, she performed the song of Yum-Yum ("The sun whose rays are all ablaze") from The Mikado by Gilbert and Sullivan at Colin Welch's memorial service.

In Florence and the Machine's 2018 single "Hunger", she opened up for the first time about an eating disorder she had as a teenager. She has also spoken of being a highly imaginative and fearful child.

Welch was educated at Thomas's London Day School, Battersea and went on to study at Alleyn's School, South East London, where she did well academically. However, Welch often got in trouble in school for impromptu singing and for singing too loudly in the school's choir. While in middle school, Welch and two of her friends started a "witch's coven", creating spellbooks and attempting to cast spells on classmates. Despite an early love of reading and literature, she was diagnosed with dyslexia, owing to problems with spelling, alongside dyspraxia, a developmental coordination disorder that does not affect her reading ability, but caused issues with organisation. Music and books gave her a reprieve from what she felt made her different from others. After leaving secondary school and spending some time working at a pub, Welch studied illustration at Camberwell College of Arts, before dropping out to focus on her music.

== Career ==
=== 2006–2010: Florence and the Machine and Lungs ===
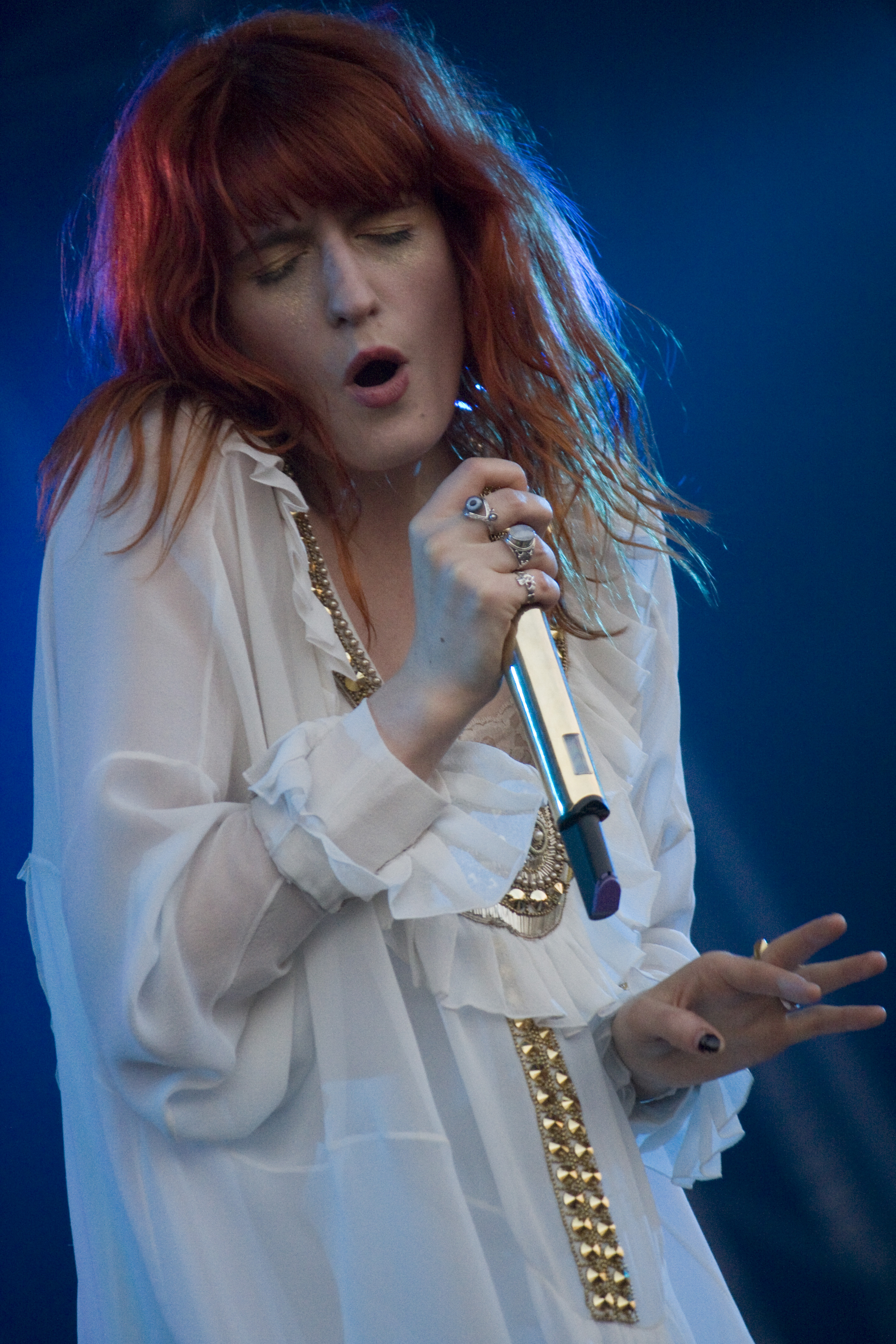
Welch performing at Primavera Sound 2010

According to Welch, the band name "Florence + the Machine" had "started off as a private joke that got out of hand. I made music with my friend, who we called Isabella Machine [Isabella Summers], to which I was Florence Robot. When I was about an hour away from my first gig, I still didn't have a name, so I thought 'Okay, I'll be Florence Robot Is A Machine', before realizing that name was so long it'd drive me mad". In 2006, Welch's performances with Isabella Summers in small London venues under the joint name Florence Robot & Isa Machine began to attract notice. In 2007, Welch recorded with a band named Ashok, who released an album titled Plans on the Filthy Lucre/About Records label. The album included the earliest version of her later hit "Kiss with a Fist", which at this point was titled "Happy Slap".

Florence and the Machine released their debut studio album Lungs in the United Kingdom on 6 July 2009. The album was officially launched with a set at the Rivoli Ballroom in Brockley, south-east London. It peaked at number one in the UK and number two in Ireland. As of 6 August 2009, the album had sold over 100,000 copies in the UK and by 10 August it had been at number two for five consecutive weeks. After its 25 July 2009 release for download in the United States, the album debuted at number seventeen on the Billboard Heatseekers Albums chart, ultimately peaking at number one. The album was released physically in the US on 20 October by Universal Republic. The album was produced by James Ford, Paul Epworth, Steve Mackey, and Charlie Hugall.

Welch contributed vocals to David Byrne and Fatboy Slim's 2010 album Here Lies Love, an album about Imelda Marcos. As of January 2011, Welch was working with Drake on material slated for his upcoming album. On 27 February 2011, Welch replaced pregnant Dido and sang her portion of Best Original Song nominee "If I Rise" (from 127 Hours) with A. R. Rahman at the 83rd Academy Awards.

=== 2011–2014: Ceremonials and solo endeavours ===
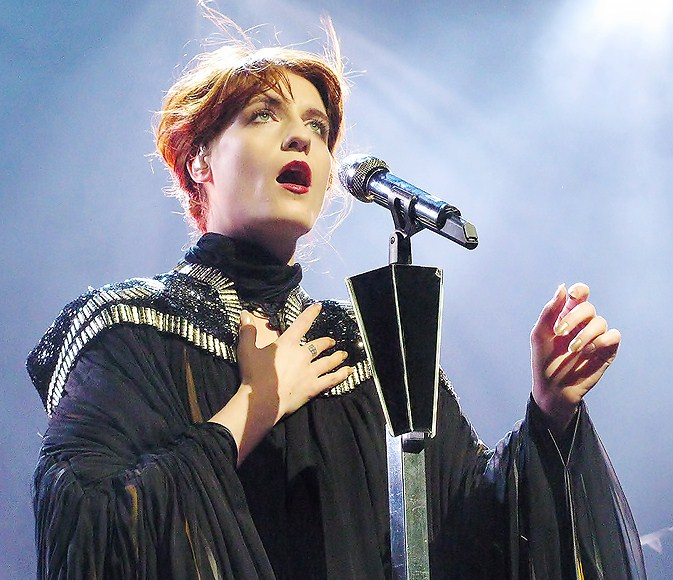
Welch performing at Borgata Event Center on the Ceremonials Tour in 2012

The band's second studio album, Ceremonials, was released on 31 October 2011. In the album, Florence's "obsession with drowning" is represented through the use of repeated water imagery. It debuted at number one on the UK Albums Chart and number six on the US Billboard 200. On 12 January 2012, Florence and the Machine were nominated for two Brit Awards, with the awards ceremony taking place on 21 February 2012 at the O2 Arena, London. On 26 April 2012, the band released "Breath of Life", a song which was recorded as the official theme song for the fantasy film Snow White and the Huntsman. On 5 July 2012, a remix of "Spectrum" by Scottish musician Calvin Harris was released as the fourth single from Ceremonials, becoming the band's first UK number-one hit. Welch expressed excitement about putting new material together for a third album once the band finished touring at the end of September 2012.

Welch led a tribute to Amy Winehouse by performing Winehouse's song "Back to Black" and the Annie Lennox-classic "Walking on Broken Glass" during the VH1 Divas Celebrates Soul concert held in December 2011. The group performed in Times Square on 31 December 2011 for the 40th annual Dick Clark's New Year's Rockin' Eve special.

In October 2012, Welch was featured on Scottish singer-songwriter and producer Calvin Harris' song "Sweet Nothing", which debuted at number one on the UK Singles Chart, marking Welch's second number one. The song was taken from Harris' third studio album 18 Months and is the fifth single from the album. "Sweet Nothing" also peaked at number one in Ireland and number two in Australia and New Zealand. "Sweet Nothing" was certified Platinum in Australia. "Sweet Nothing" received a nomination for Best Dance Recording at the 56th Annual Grammy Awards.

On 29 November 2012, Welch joined the Rolling Stones at the O2 Arena in London to sing "Gimme Shelter". Her performance with Mick Jagger was described as "sexy" and "electrifying."

=== 2015–2021: Collaborations ===
In February 2015, Florence and the Machine announced their third album, How Big, How Blue, How Beautiful, which was released on 1 June 2015. The album reached #1 in many markets including the US, the UK, Australia, and Canada. The record spawned two top 40 UK hits, and earned three Grammy nominations.

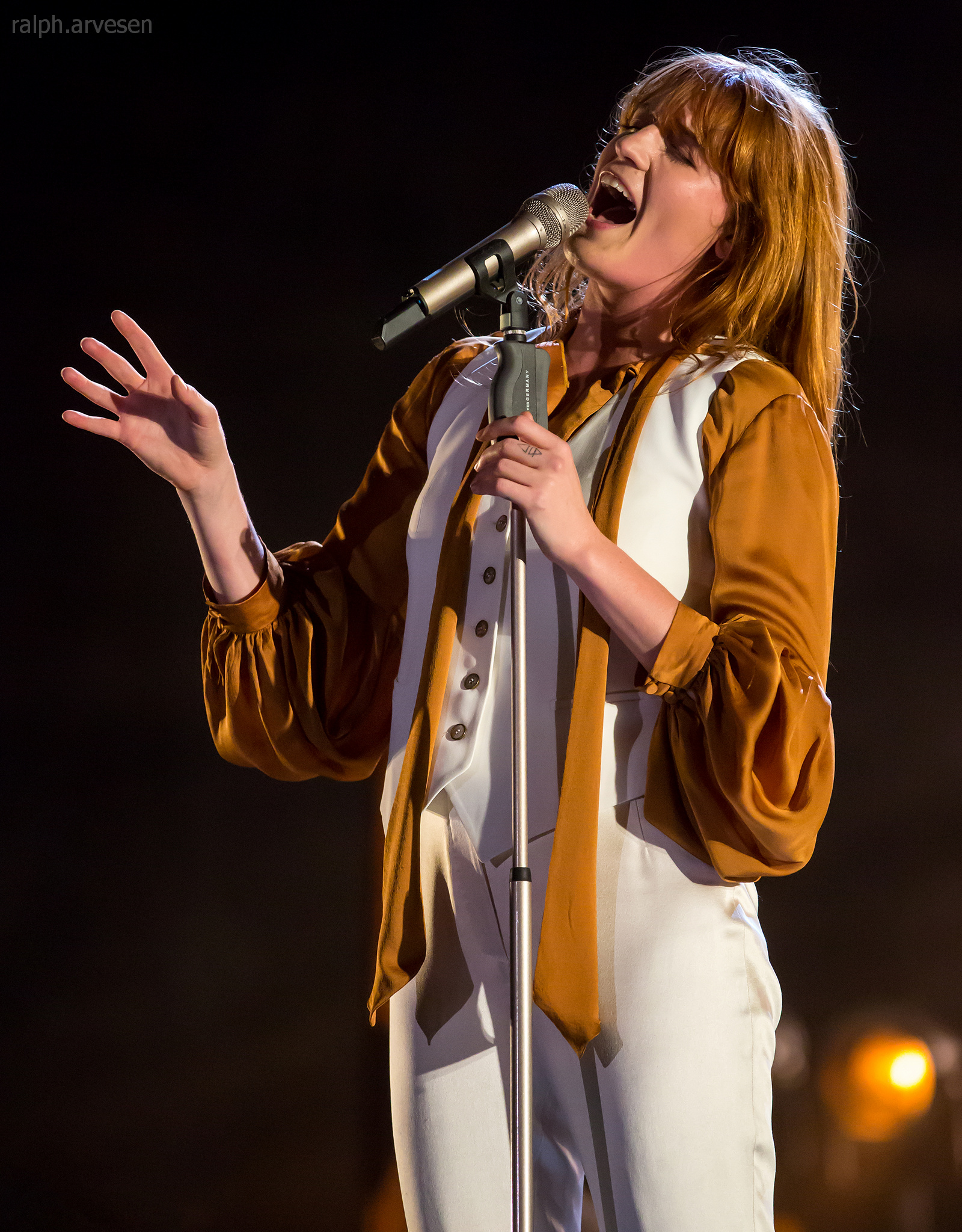
Welch performing at Austin City Limits Music Festival 2015 during the How Big, How Blue, How Beautiful Tour

During June 2015, Dave Grohl of the Foo Fighters broke his leg on stage prior to his band's upcoming Glastonbury Festival headline performance, causing Florence and the Machine to be the headline band. They headlined the festival for the first time on 26 June 2015.

In September 2016, during an interview with Heat Radio, American singer Lady Gaga revealed that she and Florence had recorded a song together. The track, titled "Hey Girl", was later featured on Gaga's fifth album Joanne. Footage of their studio session was featured in Gaga's Netflix documentary Gaga: Five Foot Two (2017).

In March 2017, Welch appeared in Song to Song directed by Terrence Malick. In May 2017, Welch contributed a song titled "To Be Human" to the Wonder Woman soundtrack. Co-written with Rick Nowels, the song is performed on the film's soundtrack by Sia and Labrinth.

On 12 April 2018, Florence and the Machine released a song titled "Sky Full of Song" and an accompanying music video on YouTube, directed by AG Rojas. The song was released for Record Store Day on 21 April, which supports brick and mortar record stores; a limited edition 7" vinyl was also released. Also in 2018 "Hunger" was released. Florence and the Machine's fourth studio album High as Hope was released on 29 June 2018.

On 22 May 2018, Florence Welch performed a duet with Mick Jagger, at London Stadium, during the Rolling Stones' No Filter Tour. They sang "Wild Horses". In July 2018, Welch published her first book Useless Magic: Lyrics and Poetry. The book showcases her lyrics and poetry, alongside corresponding artwork from the time of her first album Lungs to her 2018 release High as Hope.

On 28 April 2021, Welch announced that she would contribute music and lyrics to a musical adaptation of F. Scott Fitzgerald's The Great Gatsby, with producer Thomas Bartlett co-writing the adaptation's music and book written by Martyna Majok, with Rebecca Frecknall directing. The musical, titled Gatsby: An American Myth, premiered on 5 June 2024 at the American Repertory Theater, directed by Tony Award-winning director Rachel Chavkin.

=== 2022–present: Dance Fever and Everybody Scream ===
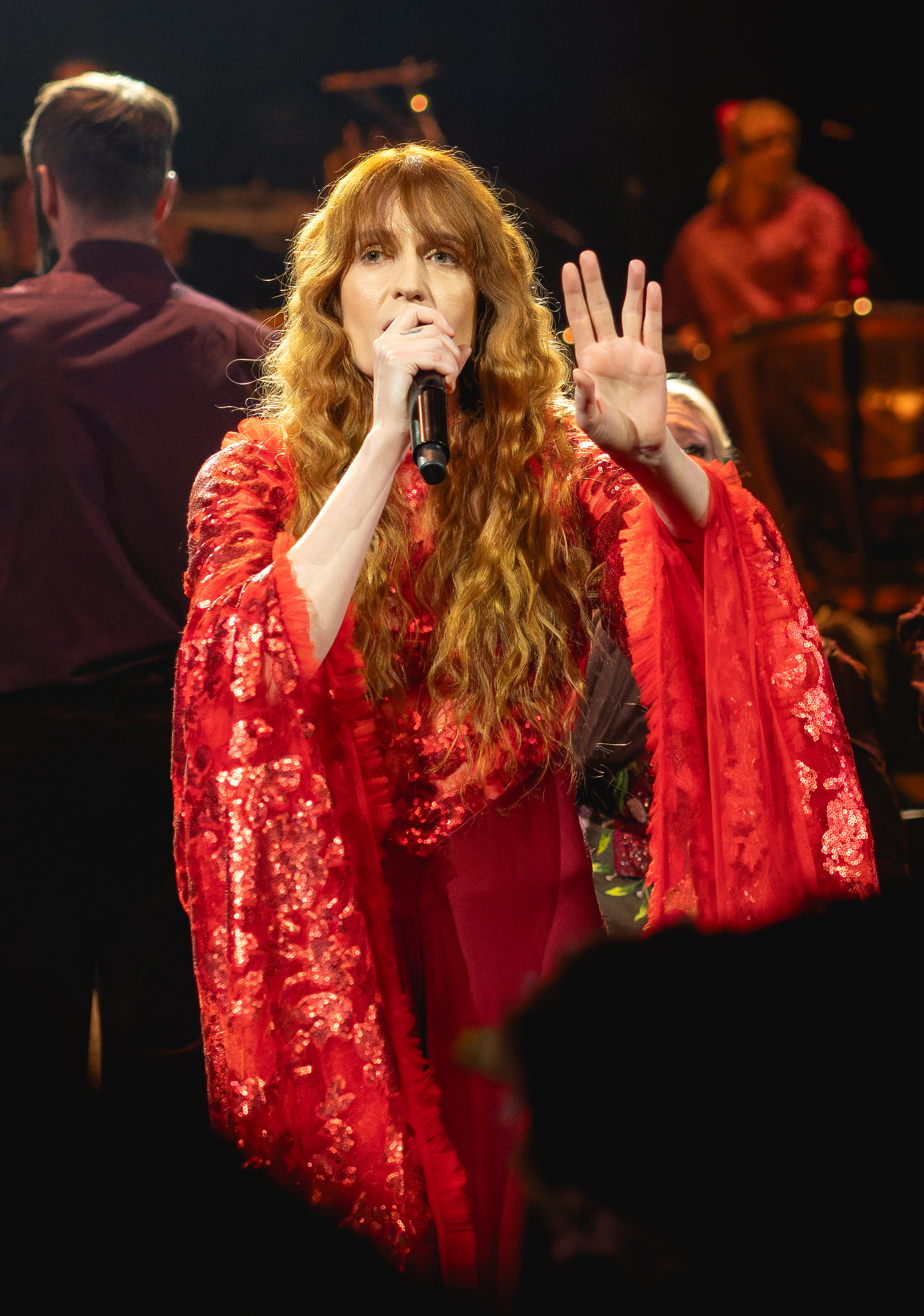
Welch performing with the Jules Buckley Orchestra as part of BBC Proms in 2024

In January 2022, it was confirmed that the band would be headlining a few summer festivals which led to many theorizing that Welch's fifth studio album could possibly be released during the first semester of 2022. By the end of February, some selected fans started receiving medieval-styled tarot cards, the cards had the words "King" and "Florence + the Machine – Chapter 1" written on them. On 23 February 2022, Welch released a single, "King", and an accompanying music video, directed by Autumn de Wilde.

On 7 March 2022, the second single was released alongside a music video, also directed by de Wilde, titled "Heaven Is Here". On 9 March 2022, Welch announced through her Instagram page that the band's fifth studio album would be titled Dance Fever and would have 14 songs, in her words "A fairytale in 14 songs". On 10 March 2022, the third single was released called "My Love" which also featured a music video directed by Autumn de Wilde. The single premiered on BBC Radio 1's morning show "Breakfast with Greg James" where Welch was the special guest and announced that the release date of their upcoming album Dance Fever was 13 May 2022.

On 14 October 2022, Dance Fever (Live at Madison Square Garden) was released. The album was recorded over two nights at MSG on 16 and 17 September 2022. In August and October 2024 respectively, Welch performed "Florida!!!" with Taylor Swift on The Eras Tour's last stop in London and on the tour's stops in Miami.

On 11 September 2024, Florence + the Machine performed with the Jules Buckley Orchestra at Royal Albert Hall for the BBC Proms 2024 Series. The performance was released as the album titled Symphony of Lungs on 25 October 2024.

In 2025, Welch collaborated with the music project Everything Is Recorded (headed by Richard Russell) on the track "Never Felt Better", which also features the singer Sampha.

On 19 August 2025, Welch announced her 6th album, Everybody Scream, which released on 31 October 2025.

== Artistry ==
Welch has been compared with other singers such as Kate Bush, Stevie Nicks, Siouxsie Sioux, PJ Harvey, Shirley Manson, Alison Goldfrapp, Tori Amos, and Björk. When describing Lungs, Welch said, "When I was writing these songs, I used to refer to myself as Florence Robot ... because I really like what a machine thinks organic instruments really sound like." Welch has a contralto voice. In 2023, Rolling Stone ranked Welch at number 128 on its list of the 200 Greatest Singers of All Time.

=== Influences ===
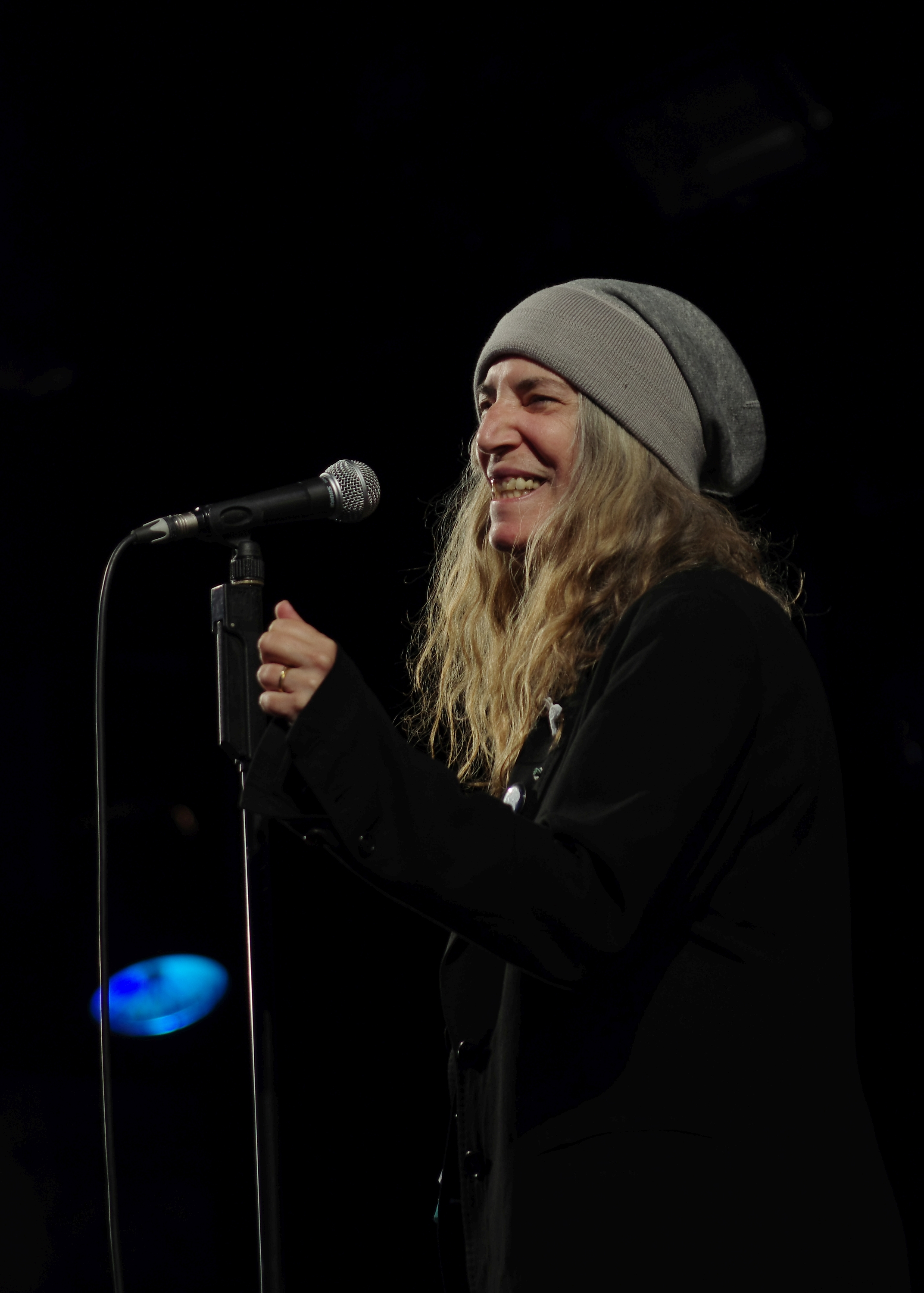
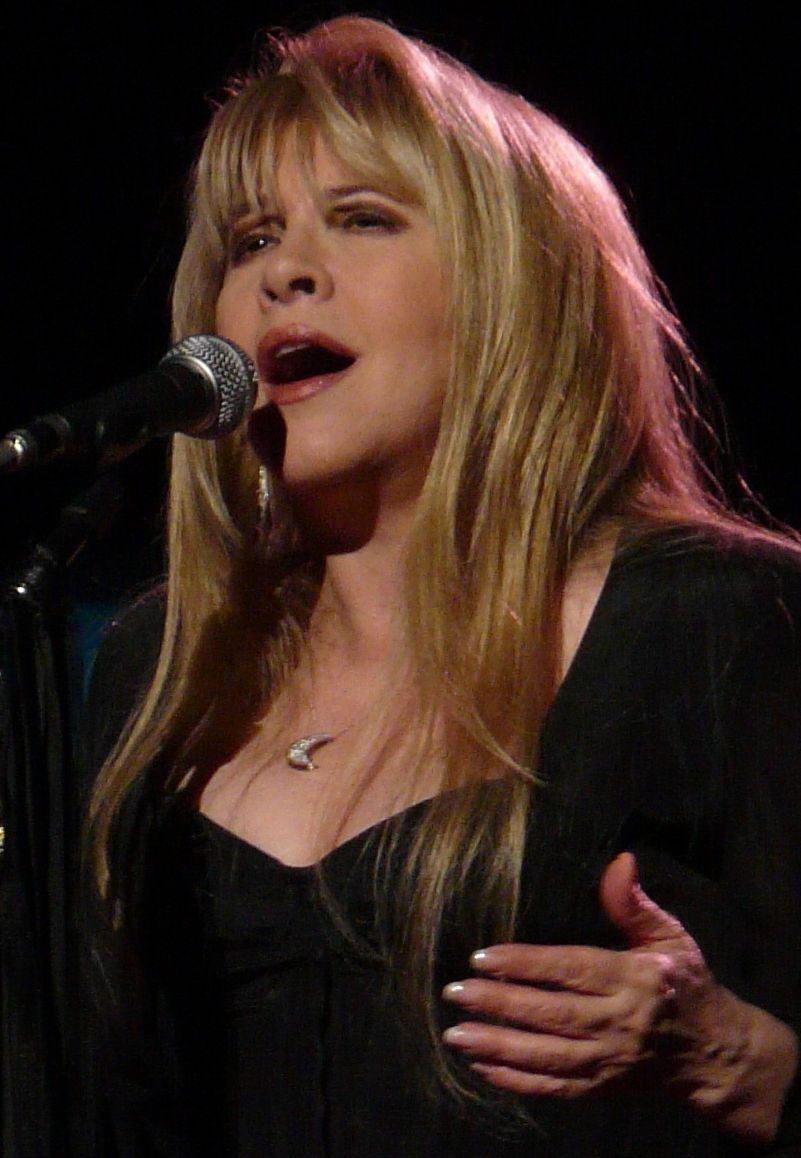
Welch named Patti Smith (left) and Stevie Nicks (right) as some of her primary influences; she wrote the song "Patricia" about the former.

During interviews, Welch has cited singers Grace Slick, Alanis Morissette, Patti Smith, and Stevie Nicks as influences and "heroes." She told Rolling Stone in 2010, "I'm pretty obsessed with [Stevie] Nicks, from her style to her voice. I like watching her on YouTube and her old performances, the way she moves and everything." Florence wrote "Patricia" on the band's 2018 album High as Hope about Smith, whom she describes as her "north star".

She has also listed in her early influences the likes of John Cale, Otis Redding, Siouxsie Sioux, Courtney Love, David Byrne, and Lou Reed. In a review of Ceremonials, Jody Rosen of Rolling Stone described Florence and the Machine's style as "dark, robust and romantic", deeming the ballad "Only If for a Night" as a mix of "classic soul and midnight-on-the-moors English art rock". Welch stated that her lyrics related to Renaissance artists: "We're dealing with all of the same things they did: love and death, time and pain, heaven and hell". Welch has used religious imagery in her music and performances, though she has stated, "I'm not a religious person. Sex, violence, love, death, are the topics that I'm constantly wrestling with, it's all connected back to religion."

Nick Welch, her father, contributed a "rock and roll element to the family mix"; in his twenties, he lived in a West End squat and attended the Squatters' Ball organised by Heathcote Williams where the 101ers played regularly. A self-confessed "frustrated performer", if Nick, as he put it, "nudged Flo in any way, it's only been to listen to the Ramones rather than Green Day." Evelyn, Welch's mother, had an equally strong, yet completely different influence on her daughter. A visit to one of her mother's renaissance lectures left teenage Florence deeply impressed. She explained, "I aspire to something like that, but with music. I hope that my music has some of the big themes—sex, death, love, violence—that will still be part of the human story in 200 years' time."

=== Image ===
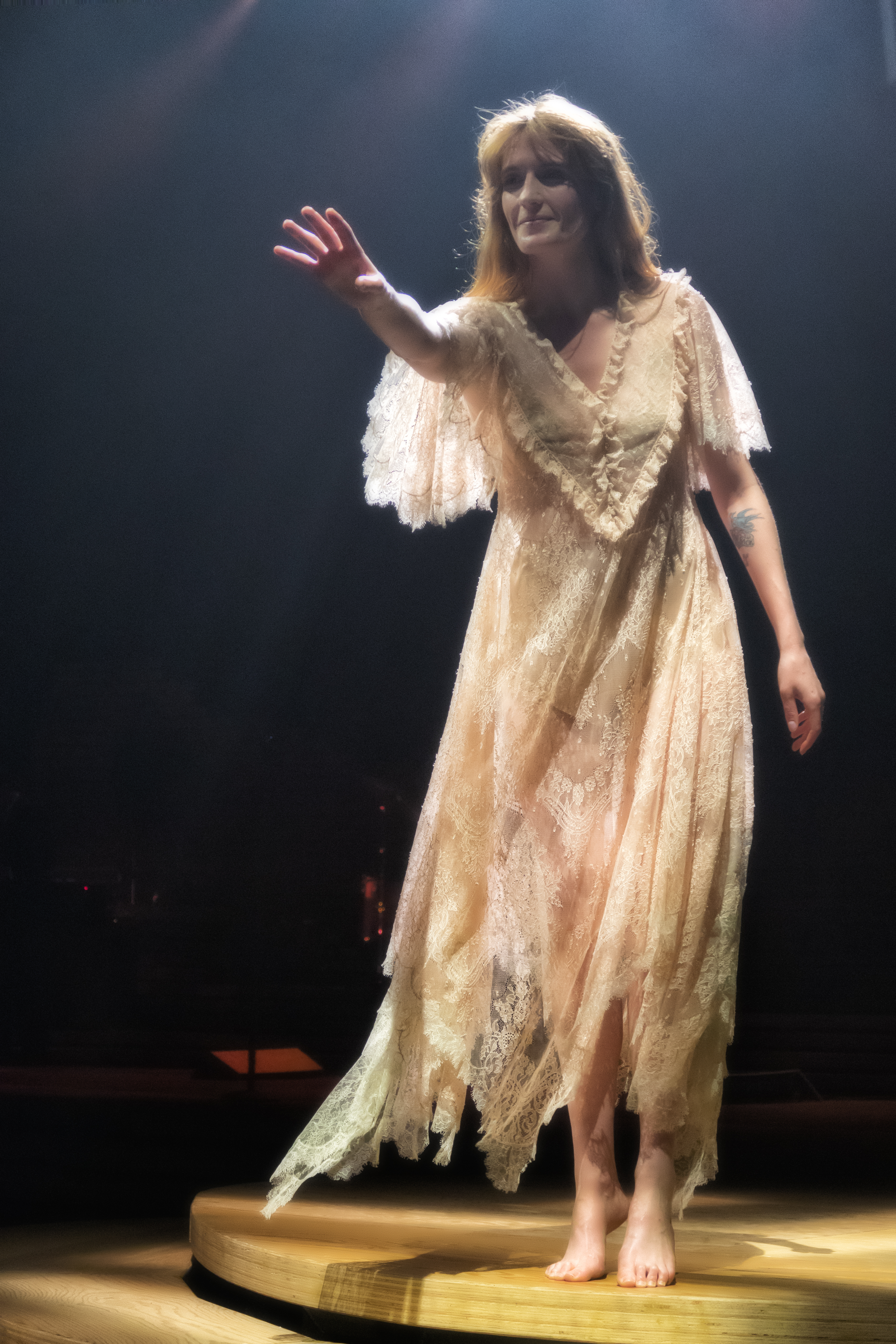
Welch (seen here on the High as Hope Tour in 2018) frequently performs barefoot. She can often be seen wearing sheer, flowy dresses, on stage or otherwise.

Welch is known for her distinctive clothing style, often performing concerts wearing light Gucci dresses, barefoot and without jewellery. Vogue described her style as Bohemian and called her "the queen of Bohemian style."

Discussing her fashion style Welch said, "For the stage, it's The Lady of Shalott meets Ophelia... mixed with scary gothic bat lady. But in real life I'm kind of prim." Welch often mixes artistic influences both in her fashion style and music, with a strong nod towards the style of the Pre-Raphaelite Brotherhood. 2011 saw Gucci dressing her for her summer tour and a performance at the Chanel runway show at Paris Fashion Week. Welch describes 1970s American drag queen troupe the Cockettes and French chanson singer Françoise Hardy as fashion mentors.

Welch has also named Fleetwood Mac member Stevie Nicks as being a musical, fashion and general influence. Welch can sometimes be seen in concert paying homage to Nicks' famous billowing stage dress.

Welch has spoken about being a "fantasist" as a child, "[I was] constantly reading books, thinking, "I'm not a mermaid. I can't breathe underwater. I can't fly." One of the saddest and most heartbreaking things is that I remember really wanting to be able to magically change my appearance." She said that this impacted her image and sound. Her style and mannerisms have led fans and the media comparing her to a witch, a mermaid, and a fairy.

== Personal life ==
Welch considers herself an introvert and is passionate about reading and literature. She has held many events with her fan-run book club, Between Two Books. "It's a huge generalisation to say that all readers are introverts; I'm sure there's a lot of extroverted bookworms out there, but, for me, it's nice to know people of similar inclinations can actually come together in a social way and talk about something that is inherently solitary."

Although many of her songs contain Christian themes and elements, Welch has said she is an agnostic and does not follow any particular religion. "I went to Catholic school, and the first songs I remember liking were hymns. I find it's nice to mix the mundane and the magical, the irrelevant with the huge themes. Sex, love, death, marriage, guilt—mix that with seeing a huge sky or going for a walk or turning the page of a book. Living is dealing with the everyday and the notion that you're going to die."

In 2022, Welch was awarded and accepted an honorary fellowship from University of the Arts London.

She lives in Kennington, South London, in the London Borough of Lambeth.

=== Health ===
Welch has been open about her struggles with anxiety and depression, as well as with alcohol. Though she has been sober since 2014, many of her songs reflect these issues. In a 2024 interview with John Seabrook, she commented on the transition to sobriety, stating that "to be conscious and to be present and to really feel what's going on, even though it's painful, it feels like much more a truly reborn spirit of rock and roll." In 2019, she discussed her panic attacks in an interview with Sinéad Burke. She explained, "My hands go tingly, my lips go tingly. I sort of think that it's very serious and I'm about to die and I have to lie on the floor and breathe...I know I'm having a panic attack, really. But I also really want someone to take me to hospital." Welch has also openly spoken of her struggles with anorexia nervosa, with her 2018 song "Hunger" detailing her experiences. In a 2022 interview with The Independent, Welch stated that while she considered herself recovered from the condition, "anorexic thinking" still formed a part of her everyday life.

In 2015, Welch broke her foot after leaping off the stage at the Coachella Festival. She revealed that she used to drink alcohol before every performance, telling Billboard: "I'm quite shy, really—that's probably why I used to drink a lot. But I don't any more. When I finally took time off to make this new record, I had time to strengthen. And when I was coming back into the fray, I really didn't want to lose that. I thought I could go dive-bomb back into it, but look what happened. I dived into it and literally broke myself."

On 28 August 2023, Welch posted a statement to her personal Instagram account. It included an apology for the cancellation of the band's 25 August and 26 August performances in Zurich and Paris: "I'm so sorry that I had to cancel the last couple of shows. My feet are fine, I had to have emergency surgery for reasons I don't really feel strong enough to go into yet, but it saved my life." In 2025, she revealed that she had suffered from a miscarriage, and that the pregnancy was ectopic. The fallopian tube had ruptured, resulting in massive internal haemorrhage that required emergency surgery.

=== Relationships ===
Welch was in an on-and-off relationship with literary editor Stuart Hammond. Their first breakup came in 2009; they got back together but permanently split in 2011. Welch was devastated following the split, but she and Hammond remain friends. In 2012, she began dating James Nesbitt, an events organiser. They broke up around 2014. Around that time, Welch started dating guitarist Felix White; the relationship lasted until 2018. As of 2022, she lived in South London with her boyfriend, who remained anonymous.

== Advocacy ==
In 2016, Welch voiced her support for Remain during the United Kingdom's EU Membership referendum. Welch is also a vocal advocate for LGBTQ+ rights and regularly waves the rainbow flag at her concerts, particularly during her song "Spectrum (Say My Name)".

In 2018, she tweeted her support for the removal of the Eighth Amendment of the Constitution of Ireland. The removal passed and legalized abortion access within the country.

During her 2019 North American tour, Welch expressed her support for women's rights during concerts in Las Vegas, Nevada, Chicago, Raleigh, North Carolina and Columbia, Maryland. She encouraged her audience to donate to the ACLU instead of buying concert merchandise.

In 2020 following the murder of George Floyd, Welch participated in Black Lives Matter protests in the UK and Brazil. In 2024, she further voiced support for the rights of Black people.

In March 2022, Welch expressed her support for Ukraine during the Russo-Ukrainian War. The Florence and the Machine video for "Heaven Is Here" was filmed in Kyiv, the capital of Ukraine. On Twitter, Welch wrote: "Two of the dancers in this video are currently sheltering. To my brave and beautiful sisters Maryne and Anastasiia. I love you. I wish I could put my arms around you. Strength." She also shared an article about ways to help Ukraine. In September 2022, it was announced that proceeds from a Florence and the Machine zine would be donated to the charitable foundation Future for Ukraine. The zine features photographs taken in November 2021 in Kyiv while shooting music videos for Dance Fever.

During the 2026 North American portion of the Everybody Scream tour, Florence and the Machine donated a portion of proceeds from ticket sales to Doctors Without Borders to support their humanitarian work. The tour also partnered with Planned Parenthood, and had reproductive healthcare resources available to concertgoers at Planned Parenthood affiliate tables.

== Discography ==
- Lungs (2009)
- Ceremonials (2011)
- How Big, How Blue, How Beautiful (2015)
- High as Hope (2018)
- Dance Fever (2022)
- Everybody Scream (2025)

=== As featured artist ===
Single	Year	Peak chart positions										Certifications	Album
Single	Year	UK	AUS	AUT	CAN	GER	IRE	NZ	NOR	SWI	US	Certifications	Album
"Sweet Nothing" (Calvin Harris featuring Florence Welch)	2012	1	2	29	15	19	1	2	13	36	10	BPI: 2× Platinum; ARIA: 6× Platinum; BVMI: Platinum; IFPI SWI: Gold; MC: 5× Platinum; RIAA: 3× Platinum; RMNZ: 3× Platinum	18 Months
"Wild Season" (Banks & Steelz featuring Florence Welch)	2017	— (Note: "Wild Season" did not enter the UK Singles Chart, but peaked at number 74 on the UK Physical Singles Chart.)	—	—	—	—	—	—	—	—	—		Anything But Words

=== Album appearances ===
Title	Year	Album
"Riverside" (Kid Harpoon and Florence Welch (backing vocals))	2008	The Second EP
"She's No Sense" (The Big Pink and Florence Welch (backing vocals))	2009	Dominos
"Here Lies Love" (David Byrne and Fatboy Slim featuring Florence Welch)	2010	Here Lies Love
"My Baby Just Cares for Me" (from The Hootenanny 2009) (Jools Holland and Florence Welch)	2012	The Golden Age Of Song
"I Come Apart" (ASAP Rocky featuring Florence Welch)	2013	Long. Live. ASAP
"Neon Citied Sea" (Felix White featuring Florence Welch (background vocals))	2013	Cosmo
"Yalla" (Felix White featuring Florence Welch (background vocals))	2013	Cosmo
"Swarm" (Felix White featuring Florence Welch (background vocals))	2013	Cosmo
"Midnight" (Felix White featuring Florence Welch)	2013	Cosmo
"The Other Side" (Emile Haynie featuring Florence Welch (backing vocals))	2015	We Fall
"When in Disgrace with Fortune and Men's Eyes (Sonnet 29)" (Rufus Wainwright featuring Florence Welch and Ben de Vries)	2016	Take All My Loves: 9 Shakespeare Sonnets
"Hey Girl" (Lady Gaga featuring Florence Welch)	2016	Joanne
"Wild Horses" (Live) (The Rolling Stones featuring Florence Welch)	2019	Honk (deluxe edition)

=== Songwriting credits ===
Year	Artist	Album	Song	Co-written with
2016	Rihanna	Anti	"Goodnight Gotham"	Robyn Fenty, Paul Epworth
2017	Sia	Wonder Woman OST	"To Be Human" feat. Labrinth	Richard Nowels Jr.
2020	CamelPhat	Dark Matter	"Easier" feat. Lowes	David Whelan, Michael Di Scala, Justin Parker
2024	Taylor Swift	The Tortured Poets Department	"Florida!!!" feat. Florence and the Machine	Taylor Swift

== Filmography ==
- 2017 – Song to Song
- 2017 – Gaga: Five Foot Two
- 2020 – The Third Day
- 2025 – Taylor Swift: The End of an Era

== Awards and nominations ==
Year	Category	Category	Nominated work	Result
2009	Brit Awards	Critics Choice Award	Florence Welch	Won
2010	NME Awards	Best Dressed	Florence Welch	Nominated
2011	Virgin Media Music Awards	Best Live Act	Florence Welch	Nominated
2011	Virgin Media Music Awards	Shameless Publicity Seeker	Florence Welch	Nominated
2012	MP3 Music Awards	The HDT Award	"Sweet Nothing" (featuring Calvin Harris)	Nominated
2013	British Fashion Awards	Best British Style	Florence Welch	Nominated
2013	NME Awards	Dancefloor Anthem	"Sweet Nothing" (featuring Calvin Harris)	Won
2013	MTV Video Music Awards Japan	Best Collaboration	"Sweet Nothing" (featuring Calvin Harris)	Nominated
2013	MTV Video Music Awards	Best Editing	"Sweet Nothing" (featuring Calvin Harris)	Nominated
2013	Billboard Music Awards	Top EDM Song	"Sweet Nothing" (featuring Calvin Harris)	Nominated
2014	Grammy Awards	Best Dance Recording	"Sweet Nothing" (featuring Calvin Harris)	Nominated
2014	iHeartRadio Music Awards	EDM Song of the Year	"Sweet Nothing" (featuring Calvin Harris)	Nominated
2014	World Music Awards	World's Best Song	"Sweet Nothing" (featuring Calvin Harris)	Nominated
2014	World Music Awards	World's Best Video	"Sweet Nothing" (featuring Calvin Harris)	Nominated
2014	World Music Awards	World's Best Female Artist	Florence Welch	Nominated
2014	World Music Awards	World's Best Live Act	Florence Welch	Nominated
2016	Grammy Awards	Best Rock Song	"What Kind of Man"	Nominated
2016	Silver Clef Awards	Best Female	Florence Welch	Won
2017	Ivor Novello Awards	International Achievement	Florence Welch	Won
2018	Mercury Prize	Album of the Year	High As Hope	Nominated
2023	Ivor Novello Awards	Songwriter of the Year	Florence Welch	Nominated

== See also ==
- List of barefooters
