= Sky Full of Song =

Single by Florence and the Machine

from the album High as Hope
- Released: 12 April 2018
- Genre: Art pop
- Length: 3:46
- Label: Virgin EMI
- Songwriters: Florence Welch; Emile Haynie; Thomas Bartlett
- Producers: Emile Haynie; Florence Welch; Thomas Bartlett

Florence and the Machine singles chronology
"Stand by Me" (2017)	"Sky Full of Song" (2018)	"Hunger" (2018)

Music video
- "Sky Full of Song" on YouTube

"Sky Full of Song" is a song by English indie rock band Florence and the Machine from their fourth studio album, High as Hope (2018). It was written and produced by Florence Welch, Emile Haynie and Thomas Bartlett. The song was released on 12 April 2018 as a 7-inch single for Record Store Day.

== Background ==
"Sky Full of Song" was inspired by Welch performing on stage. She opened up that she feels an otherworldly sense of being. However, at the same time she feels a sense of loneliness once she starts performing on stage. At times she doesn't know how to enjoy herself and so lets the song take over her being. According to Rolling Stone, Welch made a statement that “Sky Full of Song” came to her “fully formed.” She said, “Sometimes when you are performing you get so high, it’s hard to know how to come down. [...] There is this feeling of being cracked open, rushing endlessly outwards and upwards, and wanting somebody to hold you still, bring you back to yourself. It’s an incredible, celestial, but somehow lonely feeling.”

== Credits and personnel ==
Credits adapted from the liner notes of High as Hope.

Recording and management

- Recorded at Beacon House, Sunset Sound, Vox Recording Studios (Los Angeles)
- Mixed at Electric Lady Studios (New York)
- Mastered at Metropolis Mastering (London)
- Published by Universal Music Publishing Ltd, Universal Music Corp/Heavycrate Music (ASCAP), Domino Songs Ltd

Personnel

- Florence Welch – vocals, composition, production, percussion
- Emile Haynie – composition, production, synths, drums, recording
- Thomas Bartlett – composition, additional production, bass, keyboards
- Greg Leisz – pedal steel guitar
- Rob Ackroyd – guitars
- Tom Monger – harp
- Jasper Randall – vocal contractor
- Angela Parrish – backing vocals
- Leslie Stevens – backing vocals
- Brett Shaw – recording
- Morgan Stratton – additional recording
- Michael Harris – additional recording
- Zachary Zajdel – engineering assistance
- Christopher Cerullo – engineering assistance
- Tom Elmhirst – mixing
- John Davis – mastering

== Charts ==
Chart performance for "Sky Full of Song"
Chart (2018)	Peak position
Australia (ARIA)	87
Belgium (Ultratip Bubbling Under Flanders)	20
Scotland Singles (OCC)	48
New Zealand Heatseekers (RMNZ)	6
UK Singles (OCC)	81
US Hot Rock Songs (Billboard)	9

== Certifications ==
Certifications for "Sky Full of Song"
Region	Certification	Certified units/sales
Brazil (Pro-Música Brasil)	Gold	20,000^{‡}
^{‡} Sales+streaming figures based on certification alone.
