= My Love (Florence and the Machine song) =

2022 single by Florence and the Machine

Single by Florence and the Machine

from the album Dance Fever
- Released: 10 March 2022
- Genre: Disco; house; electropop; dance-pop
- Length: 3:51; 2:57 (edit)
- Label: Polydor
- Songwriters: Florence Welch; Dave Bayley
- Producers: Florence Welch; Dave Bayley

Florence and the Machine singles chronology
"Heaven Is Here" (2022)	"My Love" (2022)	"Free" (2022)

Music video
- "My Love" on YouTube

"My Love" is a song by English indie rock band Florence and the Machine, released as the third single from their fifth studio album, Dance Fever (2022). The song was released on 10 March 2022 by record label Polydor Records. "My Love" was written and produced by Florence Welch and Dave Bayley of the band Glass Animals. The music video for the song was also released on 10 March 2022, and was directed by American director Autumn de Wilde.

== Live performances ==
Florence and the Machine performed "My Love" live on The Tonight Show Starring Jimmy Fallon on 11 May 2022. The song was also featured in the setlist for a "warm-up show" at the Alice Tully Hall in New York City, ahead of the band's upcoming concert tour the Dance Fever Tour. On 15 May 2022, Florence and the Machine performed "My Love" at the 2022 Billboard Music Awards.

== Critical reception ==
In a review of Dance Fever, Neil Z. Yeung of AllMusic dubbed "My Love", "one of the band's best singles, the closest this album comes to nailing the expected level of mainstream 'dance' energy with its shimmering production, heaving beat, and festival-sized chorus".

== Music video ==
An accompanying music video released in March 2022. It was directed by Autumn de Wilde and choreographed by Ryan Heffington. Rolling Stone described the video as "ornate".

=== Synopsis ===
The video opens with Welch in a club with what NME describes as "Great Gatsby-esque official visuals", breathing heavily, with her hair in a Roaring Twenties-Esque hairstyle. She dances around the club, trying to get people seated at tables to speak to her, but all of them are frozen and unresponsive. In another shot, they are seen standing up, frozen. Welch runs through the crowd with her hair slightly unruly, trying to get a response, but is unable to do so. Later, she is shown on an elevated platform, singing while dancers dance around her. At this point, her hair is completely disheveled. One by one, the dancers collapse, with Welch finally following them. One final shot shows Welch in the silent club, breathing heavily once more.

== Track listings ==
- "My Love" – digital download / streaming
1. "My Love" (edit) – 2:57
2. "My Love" – 3:51
- "My Love" (Dave Glass Animals Remix) – digital download / streaming
1. "My Love" (Dave Glass Animals Remix) – 3:31
- "My Love" (MEDUZA Remix) – digital download / streaming
1. "My Love" (MEDUZA Remix) – 3:31

== Charts ==
Chart performance for "My Love"
Chart (2022)	Peak position
Canada Rock (Billboard)	12
Ireland (IRMA)	43
Slovakia Airplay (ČNS IFPI)	100
UK Singles (Official Charts)	51
US Hot Rock & Alternative Songs (Billboard)	23
US Rock & Alternative Airplay (Billboard)	6

== Certifications ==
Region	Certification	Certified units/sales
Brazil (Pro-Música Brasil)	Gold	20,000^{‡}
United Kingdom (BPI)	Silver	200,000^{‡}
^{‡} Sales+streaming figures based on certification alone.

== Release history ==
Release dates and formats for "My Love"
Region	Date	Format(s)	Label	Ref.
Various	10 March 2022	Digital download; streaming	Polydor	
United States	14 March 2022	Adult alternative radio	Republic	
United States	15 March 2022	Alternative radio	Republic	
