= Dance Fever (album) =

2022 studio album by Florence and the Machine

- Standard CD and LP cover

Studio album by Florence and the Machine
- Released: 13 May 2022
- Recorded: 2020–2021
- Studios: Electric Lady (New York City); Guilford Sound; RAK (London); Real World (Wiltshire); The Bridge (London); The Pool (London)
- Genres: Pop rock; baroque pop; progressive pop; alternative rock; gothic pop; folk
- Length: 47:12
- Label: Polydor
- Producers: Dave Bayley; Florence Welch; Jack Antonoff; Kid Harpoon; Doveman

Florence and the Machine chronology
High as Hope (2018)	Dance Fever (2022)	Everybody Scream (2025)

Singles from Dance Fever
- 1. "King" Released: 23 February 2022; 2. "My Love" Released: 10 March 2022; 3. "Free" Released: 20 April 2022

Dance Fever is the fifth studio album by the English indie rock band Florence and the Machine, released on 13 May 2022 by Polydor Records. Work on the album was originally scheduled for early 2020 in New York City; however, due to the COVID-19 pandemic, recording took place in London instead. Frontwoman Florence Welch has cited Iggy Pop as the biggest musical influence on the album, which features a variety of styles ranging from progressive pop to indie pop, disco, and industrial music.

The title and concept of Dance Fever originated in Welch's fascination with choreomania, a social phenomenon in early modern Europe that involved groups of people dancing erratically. The album cover was photographed by Autumn de Wilde, who also filmed music videos for the album's three singles: "King", "My Love" and "Free", as well as the song "Heaven Is Here".

Dance Fever was a commercial success in Europe, the US and Oceania. It debuted atop the UK Albums Chart in the week of its release, becoming the band's fourth number-one album in their home country. It reached the second place in Australia, Belgium, Germany, Ireland, the Netherlands, New Zealand and Portugal and debuted in the top ten of several other record charts. The album received acclaim from music critics and is ranked as the best-received album in the band's release history. Critics mainly praised the diversity of the sound, Welch's songwriting abilities and powerful vocals. "King" earned a nomination for Best Alternative Music Performance at the 65th Annual Grammy Awards. To promote the album, Florence and the Machine embarked on the Dance Fever Tour which visited cities in North America, Europe and Oceania.

== Background and recording ==
The majority of the album was recorded in London. The first recording sessions for the album were originally scheduled to take place in March 2020 in New York City but were scrapped after the World Health Organization (WHO) declared COVID-19 a pandemic. While recording the "anthemic" Dance Fever, Welch and her collaborators fostered a "dance, folk, '70s Iggy Pop" sound in the vein of "Lucinda Williams or Emmylou Harris and more" that is meant to be enjoyed during "the return of clubs, live music and dancing at festivals". Welch also found inspiration in "the tragic heroines of pre-Raphaelite art, the gothic fiction of Carmen Maria Machado and Julia Armfield, the visceral wave of folk horror film from The Wicker Man" (1973) to the A24 films The Witch (2015) and Midsommar (2019), Francis Ford Coppola's Bram Stoker's Dracula (1992) was visually a big reference for the record and the costumes, and "folkloric elements of a moral panic from the Middle Ages".

The title of the album was inspired by Welch's fascination with choreomania, a social phenomenon in early modern Europe that involved groups of people dancing erratically.

== Promotion ==
On 9 March 2022, Welch posted the album cover to her Instagram account in a post announcing the album's pre-order date. She described the album as "a fairytale in 14 songs" in the same post.

In early 2022, Florence and the Machine were confirmed to be headlining a series of summer music festivals, including the Madrid's Mad Cool. On 28 March 2022, Welch announced the Dance Fever Tour to support the album. The tour began on 2 September 2022 at Place Bell in Laval, Quebec and concluded on 21 March 2023 at the Spark Arena in Auckland, New Zealand. A 24-track live album recorded during the band's 17 September 2022 concert at Madison Square Garden, entitled Dance Fever (Live at Madison Square Garden), was released on 14 October 2022.

=== Singles ===
On 21 February 2022, fans of the band received a medieval-styled card in the mail that featured a photo of Florence Welch dressed in period clothing. The card had the word "King" on it, and each envelope was inscribed with the wording "Florence + the Machine – Chapter 1" along its back. That same day, digital billboards began popping up around London that featured the same picture of Welch that was printed on the card. The band's website was also updated with fifteen cards, the first of which featuring the mailer's design. The single, titled "King" was digitally released on 23 February 2022 along with its accompanying music video.

The first single was soon followed by the release of "Heaven Is Here", on 7 March. Music videos for both songs were shot in Kyiv shortly before Russia's invasion of Ukraine in February 2022.

The second single "My Love" and the third single "Free" were released on 10 March and 20 April, respectively. Welch dedicated the music video for "Free" to the people of Ukraine amidst the Russian invasion.

On 9 December 2022, a live version of "Morning Elvis" in a duet with Ethel Cain, recorded at the Ball Arena on 1 October 2022 during the Denver stop of the Dance Fever Tour, was released as a promotional single.

== Composition ==
Dance Fever is a pop rock, baroque pop, progressive pop, alternative rock, gothic pop, and folk album.

== Critical reception ==
Professional ratings
Aggregate scores
Source	Rating
AnyDecentMusic?	7.7/10
Metacritic	84/100
Review scores
Source	Rating
AllMusic	3.5/5 stars
Clash	9/10
The Daily Telegraph	5/5 stars
Dork	4/5 stars
The Independent	5/5 stars
The Line of Best Fit	9/10
NME	4/5 stars
Paste	8.0/10
Pitchfork	7.1/10
Rolling Stone	3.5/5 stars

Dance Fever received widespread acclaim from music critics. At Metacritic, which assigns a normalised rating out of 100 to reviews from mainstream publications, the album received an average score of 84, based on 17 reviews, indicating "universal acclaim", becoming the band's highest-scored album on the website to date. Writing for AllMusic, Neil Z. Yeung, gave the album four out of five stars and likened it to the band's previous releases Lungs (2009) and How Big, How Blue, How Beautiful (2015) in "emotional depth and uplifting power". He concluded his review by writing that the album marked "a generous offering to the goddesses of dance and restorative energy".

Sophia McDonald from Clash Music rated the album nine out of ten stars, labelling it "as majestic as it is authentic". She further praised it for its "self awareness" and deemed it "beautifully honest". Summarising the album as a whole, McDonald deemed it "[a] dance party to release your demons to, [Florence and the Machine] cast yet another lyrically beautiful and musically capitulating spell."

== Commercial performance ==
Dance Fever achieved wide commercial success across Europe. It debuted atop the UK Albums Chart, thus becoming the band's fourth number-one album in the country. The album achieved the feat with approximately 26,000 chart sales midweek during its release. Additionally, it debuted atop the Scottish Albums Chart in the week of 20 May 2022.

Dance Fever achieved commercial success in the United States and Australia as well. In the US, the album debuted at number seven on the Billboard 200 albums chart, thus becoming the band's fourth top ten record in the country. It further reached the summit of the Top Alternative Albums and Top Rock Albums charts in the country. In Australia, Dance Fever debuted at number 2 on the ARIA Charts in its first week of release on 29 May 2022.

== Track listing ==
Dance Fever track listing
No.	Title	Writer(s)	Producer(s)	Length
1.	"King"	Florence Welch; Jack Antonoff	Welch; Antonoff	4:40
2.	"Free"	Welch; Antonoff	Welch; Antonoff; Dave Bayley^{[a]}	3:54
3.	"Choreomania"	Welch; Antonoff; Thomas Bartlett	Welch; Antonoff; Doveman^{[a]}	3:33
4.	"Back in Town"	Welch; Antonoff	Welch; Antonoff	3:56
5.	"Girls Against God"	Welch; Antonoff	Welch; Antonoff	4:40
6.	"Dream Girl Evil"	Welch	Welch; Antonoff; Bayley; Doveman^{[a]}	3:47
7.	"Prayer Factory"	Welch; Antonoff	Welch; Bayley	1:13
8.	"Cassandra"	Welch; Thomas Hull	Welch; Antonoff; Kid Harpoon	4:18
9.	"Heaven Is Here"	Welch	Welch; Antonoff; Harpoon; Bayley	1:51
10.	"Daffodil"	Welch; Bayley	Welch; Bayley	3:34
11.	"My Love"	Welch; Bayley	Welch; Bayley	3:51
12.	"Restraint"	Welch; Bayley	Welch; Bayley; Harpoon^{[m]}	0:48
13.	"The Bomb"	Welch; Robert Ackroyd; Bartlett	Welch; Doveman; Antonoff	2:45
14.	"Morning Elvis"	Welch; Bayley	Welch; Bayley; Antonoff^{[a]}	4:22
Total length:				47:12

Deluxe edition bonus tracks
No.	Title	Writer(s)	Length
15.	"Cassandra" (acoustic)	Welch; Harpoon	4:07
16.	"Free" (acoustic)	Welch; Antonoff	4:04
17.	"Morning Elvis" (acoustic)	Welch; Bayley	3:53
18.	"My Love" (acoustic)	Welch; Bayley	3:30
19.	"Search and Destroy"	Iggy Pop	4:01
Total length:			66:47

Apple Music edition bonus tracks
No.	Title	Writer(s)	Producer(s)	Length
15.	"King" (poem version)	Welch; Antonoff	Welch	3:00
16.	"My Love" (poem version)	Welch; Bayley	Welch	2:52
17.	"Cassandra" (poem version)	Welch; Harpoon	Welch	4:00
18.	"King" (music video)			5:18
19.	"Heaven Is Here" (music video)			2:16
20.	"My Love" (music video)			4:24
21.	"Free" (music video)			4:51
Total length:				73:53

Complete edition bonus tracks
No.	Title	Writer(s)	Producer(s)	Length
14.	"Mermaids"	Welch; Bayley	Welch; Bayley	4:35
15.	"Morning Elvis"	Welch; Bayley	Welch; Bayley; Antonoff^{[a]}	4:22
16.	"King" (poem version)	Welch; Antonoff	Welch	3:00
17.	"My Love" (poem version)	Welch; Bayley	Welch	2:52
18.	"Cassandra" (poem version)	Welch; Harpoon	Welch	4:00
Total length:				61:39

Notes

- ^{^[a]} signifies an additional producer
- ^{^[m]} signifies a miscellaneous producer

== Personnel ==
Florence and the Machine

- Florence Welch – vocals (all tracks), string arrangement (tracks 1, 2, 5, 6, 8, 11), percussion (2, 6, 9, 10), piano (2, 6), acoustic guitar (9), foot stamping (9, 12)
- Robert Ackroyd – electric guitar (13)
- Tom Monger – harp
- Cyrus Bayandor – bass
- Aku Orraca-Tetteh – background vocals (3, 4, 6)
- Dionne Douglas – violin
- Hazel Mills – background vocals
- Sam Doyle – drums

Additional musicians

- Jack Antonoff – acoustic guitar (1–3, 5, 8), bass (1–6, 8), drums (1–6, 8, 13), Mellotron (1–4), percussion (1–3, 8), piano (1–4, 6), programming (1–3, 6, 9, 14), bells (2, 3), electric guitar (2, 3, 5), organ (2. 5, 8), 12-string acoustic guitar (3, 8), slide guitar (5, 13), synthesizer (5, 6, 8), tubular bells (8, 9), Wurlitzer organ (8)
- Evan Smith – saxophones (1, 3, 5), synthesizer (1)
- Tom Moth – harp, string arrangement (1, 2, 5, 6, 8, 11)
- Bobby Hawk – violin (1–4)
- Eric Byers – cello (2–4)
- Dave Bayley – electric guitar (2, 6, 7, 10–12, 14), strings (2, 11, 14), programming (5, 7, 9–12, 14), bells (6), percussion (6, 7, 11, 14), piano (6, 10, 11), synthesizer (6, 9, 10), bass (7, 10, 11, 14), organ (7, 12), acoustic guitar (10), drums (10, 11, 14), Mellotron (10, 14), keyboards (11)
- Thomas Bartlett – percussion (3), piano (3, 13), synthesizer (3, 4, 6, 13); accordion, drums, keyboards (13)
- Maggie Rogers – background vocals (5, 6)
- Leo Abrahams – acoustic guitar (6), electric guitar (6, 10, 14)
- Steve Pearce – bass (6)
- Ian Thomas – drums (6)
- Mark Brown – saxophone (6)
- Sally Herbert – string arrangement (6)
- Paul Burton – trombone (6)
- Joe Auckland – trumpet (6)
- Mikey Freedom Hart – acoustic guitar (7, 14); celesta, viola (7); falsetto, pedal steel guitar (14)
- Kid Harpoon – bass, drums, electric guitar, piano (8, 9); percussion (8)
- Chris Worsey – cello (11)
- Ian Burdge – cello (11)
- Everton Nelson – violin (11)
- Gillon Cameron – violin (11)
- Julia Singleton – violin (11)
- Kate Robinson – violin (11)
- Lucy Wilkins – violin (11)
- Marianne Haynes – violin (11)
- Natalia Bonner – violin (11)
- Nicky Sweeney – violin (11)
- Richard George – violin (11)
- Rick Koster – violin (11)

Technical

- Chris Gehringer – mastering
- Will Quinnell – mastering (2–14)
- Serban Ghenea – mixing (1–4, 6, 8, 10, 11)
- Jack Antonoff – mixing (5, 7, 9, 12, 13)
- Laura Sisk – mixing (5, 7, 9, 12, 13), engineering (1–6, 8, 9, 13), additional engineering (11, 14)
- David Wrench – mixing (14)
- Evan Smith – engineering (1–3, 5)
- Jon Gautier – engineering (1–4)
- Billy Halliday – engineering (5–14)
- David Hart – engineering (7)
- Jeremy Hatcher – engineering (8, 9)
- Pat Dillett – engineering (13)
- Mikey Freedom Hart – engineering (14)
- Bryce Bordone – mixing assistance (1, 3, 4, 6, 8, 10, 11)
- Dave Snyder – engineering assistance (1–6, 8, 9, 13, 14)
- Duncan Fuller – engineering assistance (1–6, 8, 10)
- John Rooney – engineering assistance (1–5, 8, 9, 11, 13, 14)
- Lauren Marquez – engineering assistance (1–6, 8, 9, 11, 13, 14)
- Matt Hall – engineering assistance (1–6, 8, 9, 13, 14)
- Megan Searl – engineering assistance (1–5)
- Ben Loveland – engineering assistance (6, 8, 10, 11, 14)
- Amy Sergeant – engineering assistance (7, 13)
- James Pinfield-Wells – engineering assistance (7, 13)
- Claude Vause – engineering assistance (12)

== Charts ==
=== Weekly charts ===
Weekly chart performance for Dance Fever
Chart (2022)	Peak position
Australian Albums (ARIA)	2
Austrian Albums (Ö3 Austria)	4
Belgian Albums (Ultratop Flanders)	2
Belgian Albums (Ultratop Wallonia)	5
Canadian Albums (Billboard)	7
Croatian International Albums (HDU)	4
Dutch Albums (Album Top 100)	2
Finnish Albums (Suomen virallinen lista)	11
French Albums (SNEP)	28
German Albums (Offizielle Top 100)	2
Greek Albums (IFPI)	26
Hungarian Albums (MAHASZ)	36
Irish Albums (IRMA)	2
Italian Albums (FIMI)	14
Lithuanian Albums (AGATA)	39
New Zealand Albums (RMNZ)	2
Norwegian Albums (VG-lista)	15
Polish Albums (ZPAV)	10
Portuguese Albums (AFP)	2
Scottish Albums (Official Charts)	1
Spanish Albums (PROMUSICAE)	5
Swedish Albums (Sverigetopplistan)	23
Swiss Albums (Schweizer Hitparade)	7
UK Albums (Official Charts)	1
US Billboard 200	7
US Top Alternative Albums (Billboard)	1
US Top Rock Albums (Billboard)	1
US Indie Store Album Sales (Billboard)	1

=== Year-end charts ===
Year-end chart performance for Dance Fever
Chart (2022)	Position
Belgian Albums (Ultratop Flanders)	84
Portuguese Albums (AFP)	76
UK Albums (OCC)	89

== Certifications ==
Certifications for Dance Fever
Region	Certification	Certified units/sales
New Zealand (RMNZ)	Gold	7,500^{‡}
United Kingdom (BPI)	Gold	100,000^{‡}
^{‡} Sales+streaming figures based on certification alone.

== See also ==
- List of UK Albums Chart number ones of the 2020s
- List of UK Album Downloads Chart number ones of the 2020s
