= To Be Human =

Single by Sia featuring Labrinth

from the album Wonder Woman (Original Motion Picture Soundtrack)
- Released: 25 May 2017
- Recorded: 2017
- Genre: Pop
- Length: 4:01
- Label: WaterTower Music
- Songwriter(s): Florence Welch; Rick Nowels
- Producer(s): Labrinth; Oli Kraus (additional); Christopher Braide (Sia vocal production)

Sia singles chronology
"Waterfall" (2017)	"To Be Human" (2017)	"Reaper" (2017)

Labrinth singles chronology
"Make Me (Cry)" (2016)	"To Be Human" (2017)	"Misbehaving" (2017)

"To Be Human" is a song recorded by Australian singer Sia featuring English singer Labrinth for the soundtrack to the 2017 superhero film Wonder Woman. It was released as a single on 25 May 2017 by WaterTower Music.

== Composition ==
"To Be Human" is a pop ballad; some critics believed it reflects the film's core relationship between Gal Gadot's Wonder Woman and Chris Pine's Steve Trevor. Lyrically, the song expresses a love that can conquer all odds. It is the only non-instrumental song on the soundtrack album.

== Critical reception ==
In Rolling Stone, Brittany Spanos thought that with the "cinematic" single, Sia "creates a sweeping, epic musical moment". Lauren Tom for Billboard wrote that "Sia's powerful song reflects the film’s underlying message", noting the singer "channels her inner Wonder Woman". Megan Davies in Digital Spy opined the song is a "powerful new anthem". Randall Colburn of Consequence of Sound wrote: "The swelling, anthemic track, is a rousing one, bound to underscore a tender moment between Gal Gadot and co-star Chris Pine".

== Charts ==
Chart (2017)	Peak position
France (SNEP)	117
US Anglo (Monitor Latino)	12
