= Hunger (Florence and the Machine song) =

Single by Florence and the Machine

from the album High as Hope
- Released: 3 May 2018
- Studio: Beacon House, Los Angeles; 123, London; The Dairy, London; Sunset Sound, Los Angeles; Vox, Los Angeles
- Genre: Alternative pop; soul
- Length: 3:34
- Label: Virgin EMI
- Songwriters: Florence Welch; Emile Haynie; Thomas Bartlett; Tobias Jesso Jr.
- Producers: Emile Haynie; Florence Welch

Florence and the Machine singles chronology
"Sky Full of Song" (2018)	"Hunger" (2018)	"Patricia" (2018)

Music video
- "Hunger" on YouTube

"Hunger" is a song by English indie rock band Florence and the Machine from their fourth studio album, High as Hope (2018). It was written by Florence Welch, Emile Haynie, Thomas Bartlett and Tobias Jesso Jr., and produced by Welch and Haynie. The song was released on 3 May 2018 as the second single of the album. An uptempo alternative pop and soul song, "Hunger" was inspired by the singer's teenage struggles with eating disorder and alcoholism.

"Hunger" received acclaim from music critics, who complimented Welch's personal lyrics in contrast to its "radio-friendly" sound, calling the song a standout from the album. The song impacted US hot adult contemporary radios on 18 June 2018. Despite achieving moderate success in Europe, the song became the band's fifth number one single on the Billboard Adult Alternative Songs chart in June 2018.

A music video for "Hunger", directed by Andrés González Rojas, was released the same day. It shows lead singer Welch dancing in an art museum. Florence and the Machine promoted the song by performing it live at several night shows in 2018. The band included the song on the set list for the High as Hope Tour (2018–2019).

== Background and release ==
Florence Welch, the lead singer of Florence and the Machine revealed "Hunger" was originally a poem, without thinking to turn out into a song. Katherine St. Asaph, a reviewer from Pitchfork, thought that the poem was originally meant for Welch's collection book Useless Magic before becoming a song.

"Hunger" was written by Welch, Emile Haynie, Thomas Bartlett, and Tobias Jesso Jr. and produced by Welch and Haynie. The song was recorded at the Beacon House, Los Angeles, and 123, London. Additional recording was provided by Tim Montague, Morgan Stratton, and Michael Harris at the Dairy in London, Sunset Sound and Vox, the latter two located in Los Angeles. Tom Elmhirst mixed the track at Electric Lady Studios, London; Bob Ludwig was in charge of the mastering, which was made at Gateway Mastering, Portland.

On 30 April 2018, the band teased through their Instagram the release of the second single from their fourth album High as Hope. "Hunger" was released on 3 May 2018 as the album's second single, alongside its release date. The song impacted US hot adult contemporary radios on 18 June 2018. A remix by German DJ and producer Claptone was released on 27 March 2019 through the duo's YouTube account.

== Composition ==
"Hunger" is an up-tempo alternative pop and soul song. According to sheet music website Musicnotes.com, the song runs at 116 beats per minute (BPM) and is played in the key of D minor. Welch's vocals range between F_{3} to D_{5}. Its instrumentation was described by Pip Williams of The Line of Best Fit to consist of reverberated staccato strings, driving percussion and deliberate piano. The Independent critic Roisin O'Connor commented that "the delicate shimmer of the tambourine and the cello gliding sweetly at the start of the build on the chorus also make this one of the best-structured songs on the record." The A.V. Club reviewer Katie Rife claimed that "Hunger" is "the closest the record comes to a 'Dog Days Are Over'-style anthem."

Welch described the song to be "about the ways we look for love in things that are perhaps not love, and how attempts to feel less alone can sometimes isolate us more," adding that "I guess I made myself more vulnerable in this song to encourage connection, because perhaps a lot more of us feel this way than we are able to admit. Sometimes when you can't say it, you can sing it." Part of the song deals with Welch's teenage struggles with an eating disorder, opening with the lyrics "At 17, I started to starve myself. I thought that love was a kind of emptiness;" while also mentioning her alcohol addictions. Ryan Reed of Rolling Stone wrote that throughout "Hunger", Welch meditates on the correlation between beauty, romance and mortality. In an interview with BBC Radio 1, Welch said the song is "also a celebration of how much I see young people changing things", citing her inspiration from young women for the track.

== Reception ==
The track received critical acclaim from music critics, with several calling it a standout. Williams praised "Hunger" for "hitting a sweet spot Welch has courted for years" and called it a standout of High as Hope. O'Connor also agreed to be a standout, complimenting "the sense of purpose both in the instrumentation and Welch's determined vocal work." Writing for Drowned in Sound, Nina Bertok noted that the song covers "one of the grimmest themes" throughout the album despite its "radio-friendly festival anthem" sound. Christopher Roberts from Under the Radar ranked the track as the second of the "Ten Best Songs of the Week".

"Hunger" reached number 41 on the UK Singles Chart in the United Kingdom. The single received a silver certification by the British Phonographic Industry (BPI), which denotes track-equivalent sales of two hundred thousand units based on sales and streams. In the United States, the song debuted at number one on the Billboard Adult Alternative Songs, becoming the band's fifth non-consecutive number one single on that chart. The song was also certified gold by Music Canada (MC) for shipments of over 40,000 copies in Canada.

== Music video ==
A music video for "Hunger" was uploaded through the band's YouTube channel the same day of the song's release. It was directed by Andres Gonzalez Rojas, who had previously collaborated with Florence and the Machine on the video for "Sky Full of Song". The video was uploaded to the band's channel the same day of the song's release. The clip sees Welch "letting loose and break out into dance at an art museum." At the end of the video, a shot of a statue buried in a desert appears with flowers growing in it, reminiscent of the scenery of Percy Bysshe Shelley's Ozymandias. As of June 2022 the video has received over 45 million views.

== Live performances ==
"Hunger" made its live debut at the Victoria Theatre in Halifax, England on 5 May 2018, their first live performance of 2018. The song was later performed at several night shows. On 7 May 2018, the song was performed at The Tonight Show Starring Jimmy Fallon. "Hunger" was also performed at the Late Night with Seth Meyers, The Late Show with Stephen Colbert and Later... with Jools Holland. The band also appeared performing the song on 29 May 2018 at the Later... with Jools Holland, where they also performed the then-unreleased track "100 Years" from their album. Aside those performances, the band performed the song at the finale of the fourteenth season of The Voice. "Hunger" was included on the set list for Florence and the Machine's High as Hope Tour in 2018 and 2019.

== Credits and personnel ==
Credits adapted from the liner notes of High as Hope.

Recording and management

- Recorded at Beacon House, The Dairy, Sunset Sound, Vox Recording Studios (Los Angeles), 123 (London)
- Mixed at Electric Lady Studios (New York)
- Mastered at Gateway Mastering (Portland)
- Published by Universal Music Publishing Ltd, Universal Music Corp/Heavycrate Music (ASCAP), Domino Songs Ltd

Personnel

- Florence Welch – vocals, composition, production, additional drums
- Emile Haynie – composition, production, synths, additional drums, recording
- Thomas Bartlett – composition, piano, Mellotron, organ
- Greg Leisz – pedal steel guitar
- Rob Ackroyd – guitars
- Jonathan Wilson – additional guitar
- Carla Azar – drums
- Tom Monger – harp
- Brett Shaw – recording
- Tim Montague – additional recording
- Morgan Stratton – additional recording
- Michael Harris – additional recording
- Zachary Zajdel – assistant engineering
- Christopher Cerullo – assistant engineering
- Tom Elmhirst – mixing
- Bob Ludwig – mastering

== Charts ==
=== Weekly charts ===
Chart (2018)	Peak position
Australia (ARIA)	92
Belgium (Ultratop 50 Flanders)	42
Belgium (Ultratip Bubbling Under Wallonia)	20
France (SNEP)	127
Greece (IFPI)	77
Iceland (RÚV)	2
Ireland (IRMA)	43
Scotland Singles (Official Charts)	23
New Zealand Heatseekers (RMNZ)	6
UK Singles (Official Charts Company)	41
US Bubbling Under Hot 100 (Billboard)	17
US Adult Pop Airplay (Billboard)	33
US Adult Alternative Songs (Billboard)	1
US Hot Rock Songs (Billboard)	9
US Rock & Alternative Airplay (Billboard)	8

=== Year-end charts ===
Chart (2018)	Position
US Hot Rock Songs (Billboard)	28

== Certifications ==
Region	Certification	Certified units/sales
Australia (ARIA)	Platinum	70,000^{‡}
Brazil (Pro-Música Brasil)	Platinum	40,000^{‡}
Canada (Music Canada)	Gold	40,000^{‡}
New Zealand (RMNZ)	Gold	15,000^{‡}
United Kingdom (BPI)	Gold	400,000^{‡}
United States (RIAA)	Gold	500,000^{‡}
^{‡} Sales+streaming figures based on certification alone.

== Release history ==
Release dates and formats for "Hunger"
Region	Date	Format	Label	Ref.
United Kingdom	3 May 2018	Digital download; streaming	Virgin EMI	
United States	18 June 2018	Hot adult contemporary	Republic	
