= Wonder Woman (soundtrack) =

Wonder Woman: Original Motion Picture Soundtrack

Soundtrack album by Rupert Gregson-Williams
- Released: June 2, 2017
- Recorded: 2017
- Genre: Soundtrack
- Length: 78:38
- Label: WaterTower
- Producer: Rupert Gregson-Williams

Rupert Gregson-Williams chronology
Sandy Wexler (2017)	Wonder Woman: Original Motion Picture Soundtrack (2017)	Terminal (2018)

Singles from Wonder Woman
- 1. "To Be Human" Released: May 25, 2017

Wonder Woman: Original Motion Picture Soundtrack is the soundtrack to the 2017 film Wonder Woman. The music was composed and arranged by Rupert Gregson-Williams. It was released on June 2, 2017, by WaterTower Music.

Rupert Gregson-Williams was hired to compose the film's music in November 2016. He is joined by Evan Jolly, Tom Howe, Paul Mounsey, and Andrew Kawczynski who provide additional music. The soundtrack was released on the same day as the film on CD, digital, and vinyl. (Note: Attributed to multiple references:)

The soundtrack features the exclusive song "To Be Human", which was written by Florence Welch and Rick Nowels, and performed by Sia and Labrinth. The song was released as a single on May 25, 2017.

== Track listing ==
All music is composed by Rupert Gregson-Williams, except where noted.

No.	Title	Artist(s)	Length
1.	"Amazons of Themyscira"		6:47
2.	"History Lesson"		5:16
3.	"Angel on the Wing"		3:45
4.	"Ludendorff, Enough!"		7:37
5.	"Pain, Loss & Love"		5:27
6.	"No Man's Land"		8:52
7.	"Fausta"		3:20
8.	"Wonder Woman's Wrath"		4:06
9.	"The God of War"		8:02
10.	"We Are All to Blame"		3:11
11.	"Hell Hath No Fury"		3:58
12.	"Lightning Strikes"		3:35
13.	"Trafalgar Celebration"		4:50
14.	"Action Reaction"		5:54
15.	"To Be Human" (Florence Welch and Rick Nowels)	Sia featuring Labrinth	4:00
Total length:			78:38

Music appearing in the film and not included on the soundtrack

#	Title	Performer(s)
1	"Another Little Drink Wouldn't Do Us Any Harm"	Edgar Trevor & Cecil Cooper
2	"Molly O'Morgan" (by Fred Godfrey and Will Letters)	Ella Retford
3	"It's a Long Way to Tipperary"	Jack Judge
4	"Sous les ponts de Paris"	Lucienne Delyle
5	"I'll Walk Beside You"	Ewen Bremner
6	"Green Grow the Rushes, O"	Ewen Bremner
7	"Schatzwalzer Op. 4"	Berlin String Quartet

== Charts ==
Chart (2017)	Peak position
Australian Albums (ARIA)	52
Canadian Albums (Billboard)	98
New Zealand Heatseekers Albums (RMNZ)	5
Scottish Albums (Official Charts)	71
US Billboard 200	53
US Soundtrack Albums (Billboard)	7
