= So High School =

2024 song by Taylor Swift

Song by Taylor Swift

from the album The Tortured Poets Department: The Anthology
- Released: April 19, 2024
- Studio: Long Pond (Hudson Valley)
- Genre: Indie rock; slacker rock; power pop
- Length: 3:48
- Label: Republic
- Songwriters: Taylor Swift; Aaron Dessner
- Producers: Taylor Swift; Aaron Dessner

Lyric video
- "So High School" on YouTube

"So High School" is a song by the American singer-songwriter Taylor Swift from the double album edition of her eleventh studio album, The Tortured Poets Department: The Anthology (2024). Written and produced by Swift and Aaron Dessner, "So High School" is an indie rock, slacker rock, and power pop track backed by strumming guitar, evoking various 1990s rock subgenres. The lyrics are about how a romantic relationship makes Swift relive the feeling of young love.

Some critics praised the nostalgia-inducing production, comparing it to the works of Sheryl Crow, but others found the lyrical content lightweight and cliché. The song peaked at number 30 on the Billboard Global 200 and reached the national charts in Australia, Canada, New Zealand, Portugal, and the United States. Swift included "So High School" in the revamped setlist for the Eras Tour, starting from May 2024.

== Background and release ==
Taylor Swift announced her eleventh original studio album, The Tortured Poets Department, at the 66th Annual Grammy Awards on February 4, 2024. She had worked on the album shortly after finishing her tenth album, Midnights (2022), and continued writing during the early run of the Eras Tour in 2023. The standard album was released on April 19, 2024, and a double album edition subtitled The Anthology was surprise-released two hours later. "So High School" is taken from The Anthology and is track number 22 from the album.

From May 2024, Swift revamped the set list of the Eras Tour to include tracks from The Tortured Poets Department, including "So High School". The track is performed in a truncated version during the outro of the number "But Daddy I Love Him". Swift performed the track as part of the surprise song set on July 6 in Amsterdam, in a mashup with "Mary's Song (Oh, My, My, My)" and "Everything Has Changed".

== Production and composition ==
At 3 minutes and 48 seconds long, "So High School" was written and produced by Swift and Aaron Dessner, who provided drum machine programming and played bass guitar, bass synth, electric guitar, keyboards, percussion, piano, and synthesizers. James McAlister also provided drum machine programming and played drums, electric guitar, and synthesizers; his performance was recorded by Bella Blasko at Hudson Valley. Benjamin Lanz used a sequencer for the track and played trombone and synthesizers such as a modular synthesizer; he recorded his performance at Paris. Blasko and Jonathan Low recorded "So High School" at Long Pond Studios at Hudson Valley and Serban Ghenea mixed it at Mixstar Studios in Virginia Beach, Virginia. Bryce Bordone engineered the track. The song was mastered by Randy Merrill at Sterling Sound in Edgewater, New Jersey, where Ryan Smith mastered it for vinyl as well.

"So High School"
"So High School" is an indie rock, slacker rock, and power pop song accompanied by strumming guitar.

Backed by strumming guitar, "So High School" is an indie rock, slacker rock, and power pop song, with a pop rock arrangement and touches of dream pop. Craig Jenkins of Vulture and Jake Viswanath of Bustle believed that the track has a 1990s alternative rock feel, while Rolling Stone's Rob Sheffield said that its "light-hearted power-pop guitar jangle" evokes "Hits Different" from Midnights. Jack Irvin from People labeled the song a sonic throwback to Swift's 2008 album Fearless. Other critics likened "So High School" to the music of other artists from the past; Beats Per Minute's John Wohlmacher called the song a "throwback at millennial soft rock" reminiscent of Third Eye Blind and Avril Lavigne, The Hollywood Reporter's Ryan Fish compared its feel to that of 1980s and 1990s dream pop tracks like Simple Minds' "Don't You (Forget About Me)" and Tears for Fears' "Head over Heels", and The Wall Street Journal's Mark Richardson named the Primitives and the Sundays as reference points.

The lyrics of "So High School" revolves around careless teenage romance reminiscent of high-school love. The lover is portrayed as a football player, a lyrical motif that evokes Swift's Fearless songs like "You Belong with Me" or "Fifteen". Swift sings about youth experiences in the lines: "I'm watching American Pie with you on a Saturday night", "Truth, dare, spin bottles", and "Touch me while your bros play Grand Theft Auto". Swift also hints at showing up during her love interest's football games and practices in the lyrics.

== Critical reception ==
Positive reviews regarded "So High School" as a sonic standout on The Tortured Poets Department for its bright and nostalgia-inducing sound. In Billboard's ranking of all 31 tracks, "So High School" was placed seventh, with Jason Lipshutz writing: "obvious back-half highlight, simply by flexing a little muscle amidst the nostalgia trip." Fish ranked it tenth out of the 31 tracks, regarding it as one of the album's "bright spots" and complimenting its "sweeping feeling" akin to 1980s and 1990s dream pop songs. Richardson called it a highlight off of the album in his generally negative review, because "it serves as a temporary respite from the word-drunk confessionals that dominate the record". Jenkins praised the combination of 1990s alternative rock with "the gorgeous reediness of a Sheryl Crow or Aimee Mann". USA Today's Melissa Ruggieri also found similarities to Sheryl Crow and lauded the production as "bouncy" and "breezy glow". Vogue Australia's Nina Miyashita and Jonah Waterhouse described it as an "all-American, feel-good love song" and compared it to Swift's "young and in love Fearless era". Mary Kate Carr of The A.V. Club dubbed "So High School" a "fun, poppy number" that prevents the album from being monotonous, and Jonathan Keefe of Slant Magazine thought that the track had potentials of becoming a radio hit. Writing for the Los Angeles Times, Kaitlyn Huamani complimented the sentimental production set despite the cliché lyrics.

Reception of the lyrics was not as uniformly positive. Some publications praised the lyrics for giving listeners a chance to reminisce about their teenage years. Slate's Carl Wilson wrote that the football imagery is "so weak and tossed-off as to be wholly extraneous". Wohlmacher wrote that the lyrics' rhyming is "clumsy", but he contended that it was fully intentional so as to make the song "fun". Exclaim!'s Alex Hudson lauded the sound as "vibrantly nostalgic" but said that some lyrics are "cringe-inducing", citing the lines that rhyme "Aristotle" with "Touch me while your bros play Grand Theft Auto". Hudson however added that its "awkward" sentiment also represents what teenage romance feels like.

== Commercial performance ==
When The Tortured Poets Department: The Anthology was released, "So High School" debuted and peaked at number 24 on the US Billboard Hot 100. In Australia, it reached number 26 on the ARIA Singles Chart and made her the artist with the most entries in a single week with 29. Elsewhere, "So High School" opened at its peak of number 30 on the Billboard Global 200 and charted within the countries of Canada (28), New Zealand (33), and Portugal (82). The song also reached the United Kingdom's streaming and sales charts with respective peaks of number 35 and number 66, Sweden's Heatseeker chart at number five, and Greece's International Top 100 Digital Singles chart at number 53.

== Personnel ==
Credits are adapted from the liner notes of The Tortured Poets Department: The Anthology.

- Taylor Swift – lead vocals, songwriter, producer
- Aaron Dessner – songwriter, producer, bass guitar, synth bass, drum machine programming, electric guitar, keyboards, percussion, piano, synthesizer
- Serban Ghenea – mixing
- Bryce Bordone – engineer
- Jonathan Low – recording engineer
- Bella Blasko – recording engineer
- James McAlister – drums, drum machine programming, recording, electric guitar, synthesizer
- Benjamin Lanz – modular synthesizer, synthesizers, sequencer, trombone
- Randy Merrill – mastering
- Ryan Smith – mastering

== Charts ==
Chart performance
| Chart (2024) | Peak position |
|---|---|
| Australia (ARIA) | 26 |
| Canada Hot 100 (Billboard) | 28 |
| Global 200 (Billboard) | 30 |
| Greece International (IFPI) | 53 |
| New Zealand (Recorded Music NZ) | 33 |
| Portugal (AFP) | 82 |
| Sweden Heatseeker (Sverigetopplistan) | 5 |
| UK Singles Sales (OCC) | 66 |
| UK Streaming (OCC) | 35 |
| US Billboard Hot 100 | 24 |

== Certifications ==
Certifications for "So High School"
| Region | Certification | Certified units/sales |
|---|---|---|
| Australia (ARIA) | Platinum | 70,000^{‡} |
| Brazil (Pro-Música Brasil) | 2× Platinum | 80,000^{‡} |
| New Zealand (RMNZ) | Gold | 15,000^{‡} |
| United Kingdom (BPI) | Silver | 200,000^{‡} |
^{‡} Sales+streaming figures based on certification alone.
