= High as Hope =

Studio album by Florence and the Machine
- Released: 29 June 2018
- Recorded: 2017–2018
- Studios: Beacon House, Los Angeles; 123, London (Note: Except tracks 5 and 10); The Dairy, London (Note: Additional recording on tracks 2 and 9); Sunset Sound, Los Angeles (Note: Additional recording on tracks 2 and 5); Vox, Los Angeles (Note: Additional recording on tracks 2, 4 and 5); Henson, Los Angeles (Note: Additional recording on tracks 3, 4 and 8); Abbey Road, London (Note: Additional recording on track 7); Air, London (Note: Orchestra)
- Genres: Indie pop; art pop; orchestral rock
- Length: 39:57
- Labels: Republic; Virgin EMI
- Producers: Emile Haynie; Florence Welch; Brett Shaw; Thomas Bartlett; Tobias Jesso Jr.

Florence and the Machine chronology
Songs from Final Fantasy XV (2016)	High as Hope (2018)	Dance Fever (2022)

Singles from High as Hope
- 1. "Sky Full of Song" Released: 12 April 2018; 2. "Hunger" Released: 3 May 2018; 3. "Patricia" Released: 10 August 2018

High as Hope is the fourth studio album by English indie rock band Florence and the Machine. It was released on 29 June 2018, by Republic and Virgin EMI Records. It was preceded by the singles "Sky Full of Song" and "Hunger". "Patricia" was released as the third and final single on 10 August 2018.

The album was executively produced by Florence Welch herself, along with Emile Haynie. Following How Big, How Blue, How Beautiful (2015), High as Hope features more minimalist, stripped-down productions and explores themes of heartache, loss, family, and finding comfort in loneliness. The album received positive reviews upon release, with music critics lauding Welch's vocal delivery and personal lyricism.

== Background and recording ==
On 18 April 2017, Nathan Willett, the frontman of Cold War Kids hinted in an interview, that the band's fourth album is in the works by expressing that he had collaborated with Welch. The news was confirmed by Welch herself on 27 May 2017, in an interview for The Daily Telegraph. On 28 February 2018, the band's drummer, Christopher Hayden announced via Instagram that he had parted ways with the band. In March 2018, the Dutch Record Store Day website revealed that a new single by the band would be released on 12 April 2018, titled "Sky Full of Song". The listing was later removed. The single was released on 12 April 2018. The song is accompanied by a video, which was directed by AG Rojas. On 6 April 2018, the BBC announced that the band would headline the BBC Music Biggest Weekend on 26 May 2018, where the band is expected to debut new work. The band was set to perform worldwide as well, with shows scheduled throughout 2018.

Talking about the title and the themes explored on the album in an interview with Universal Music, Florence Welch said: "There is loneliness in this record, and there's issues, and pain, and things that I struggled with, but the overriding feeling is that I have hope about them, and that's what kinda brought me to this title; I was gonna call it The End of Love, which I actually saw as a positive thing cause it was the end of a needy kind of love, it was the end of a love that comes from a place of lack, it's about a love that's bigger and broader, that takes so much explaining. It could sound a bit negative but I didn't really think of it that way." Welch is a credited producer for the first time in her discography, as she decided to take charge in making the music, with six months alone spent on demos.

Welch's lyrics deal with wanting and love, with her describing “Big God” as “obviously, an unfillable hole in the soul, but mainly about someone not replying to my text.” Intimate subjects are discussed, such as "Hunger" referencing an eating disorder in the singer's teenage years, and "The End of Love" addressing her grandmother's suicide, a topic she has previously explored on the Ceremonials track "Only If for a Night". Welch also created "Patricia" in dedication to her idol Patti Smith.

The album title is taken from a poem Welch wrote after wandering through New York City with a friend: “Heady with pagan worship/of water towers/fire escapes, ever reaching/high as hope.”

== Critical reception ==
Professional ratings
Aggregate scores
Source	Rating
AnyDecentMusic?	7.2/10
Metacritic	75/100
Review scores
Source	Rating
AllMusic	3/5 stars
The A.V. Club	B
The Daily Telegraph	5/5 stars
The Guardian	3/5 stars
The Independent	4/5 stars
NME	3/5 stars
Pitchfork	5.7/10
Q	4/5 stars
Rolling Stone	3.5/5 stars
The Times	5/5 stars

High as Hope received positive reviews from music critics upon release, with critics praising Welch's vocals, her themes, and the minimalist production. At Metacritic, which assigns a normalised rating out of 100 to reviews from mainstream publications, the album received an average score of 75, based on 29 reviews, indicating "generally favourable reviews". Writing for The Daily Telegraph, Neil McCormick gave the album a perfect score, stating that "Welch's singing throughout is extraordinary, shifting gears effortlessly from melancholic softness to high-powered exultation, even ululation. Every gasp, growl and fluttery trill seems perfectly placed." Roisin O'Connor of The Independent awarded the record a rating of four stars out of five, praising several songs, saying "'Grace' is a moving love letter to her younger sister which asks for forgiveness for her past, chaotic behaviour" and "stirring violins open 'The End of Love' like a sinister eulogy; Welch's voice comes in with gorgeously textured harmonies, unfolding elegantly as she details a finished relationship with bittersweet recollections."

AllMusic critic Neil Z. Yeung wrote, "Straightforward and relatably human, High as Hope may not be the rousing version of Welch from previous albums, but as a document of her personal growth, it's an endearing and heartfelt study of truth and self-reflection." Sputnikmusic gave the album a perfect score, writing, "The easiest and most likely path to continued success for Welch and company would have been to attempt to re-create the spellbinding magic of Ceremonials or the anthemic qualities of Lungs. High as Hope is neither, and that makes it hands down the most forward-thinking album of Florence and the Machine's care."

In a less enthusiastic review, NME gave High as Hope a rating of three stars out of five and called the album "safe", stating "Stripped to the bare bones of her soul and the sentiment, her truth shines – and there's a beauty in that. The only thing holding it back is a lack of risk, but there's still so much comfort in the familiar." Similarly, Slant Magazine reviewer Josh Goller also gave the album three stars out of five, and said "Welch widens the song's ['Hunger''s] scope from a specific personal battle with an eating disorder to a broader emphasis on universal craving for love and acceptance, but trite statements about the destructive nature of fame and drugs are emblematic of the album's overall tendency to retreat into sweeping, generalized sentiments. Welch strikes a more effective balance between the personal and the universal on 'Big God'."

== Commercial performance ==
High as Hope debuted at number two on the UK Albums Chart, selling 40,304 copies in its first week. In the United States, the album debuted at number two on the Billboard 200 with 84,000 album-equivalent units, including 74,000 pure album sales, becoming Florence and the Machine's third US top 10 album. The album was kept out of the top spot in both countries by Drake's Scorpion. High as Hope has sold 80,700 in the UK as of September 19, 2018.

== Track listing ==
No.	Title	Writer(s)	Producer(s)	Length
1.	"June"	Florence Welch	Emile Haynie; Welch; Brett Shaw^{[b]}	3:41
2.	"Hunger"	Welch; Tobias Jesso Jr.; Haynie; Thomas Bartlett	Haynie; Welch	3:34
3.	"South London Forever"	Welch; Shaw	Haynie; Welch; Shaw^{[a]}	4:22
4.	"Big God"	Welch; Jamie Smith	Haynie; Welch; Shaw^{[b]}	4:01
5.	"Sky Full of Song"	Welch; Haynie; Bartlett	Haynie; Welch; Bartlett^{[b]}	3:46
6.	"Grace"	Welch; Haynie; Jesso; Sampha Sisay	Haynie; Welch; Shaw^{[b]}	4:48
7.	"Patricia"	Welch; Haynie; Bartlett	Haynie; Welch; Shaw^{[b]}	3:37
8.	"100 Years"	Welch	Haynie; Welch; Shaw^{[b]}	4:58
9.	"The End of Love"	Welch; Jesso	Haynie; Welch; Jesso^{[a]}	4:41
10.	"No Choir"	Welch; Haynie; Andrew Wyatt	Haynie; Welch	2:29
Total length:				39:57

High as Hope – Picture Disc box set (bonus disc)
No.	Title	Writer(s)	Length
11.	"Hunger" (acoustic)	Welch; Jesso Jr.; Haynie; Bartlett	3:34
12.	"South London Forever" (acoustic)	Welch; Shaw	4:30
13.	"Patricia" (acoustic)	Welch; Haynie; Bartlett	4:25

Notes

- ^{^[a]} signifies a co-producer.
- ^{^[b]} signifies an additional producer.
- "Big God" contains sampled elements from "Azure-Blue" by Simon Benson and Peter Cox.

== Personnel ==
Musicians

- Florence Welch – vocals, drums (1, 3, 4), percussion (1, 4, 5, 7–9), piano (3, 4, 8), additional synths (1), additional drums (2)
- Emile Haynie – synths (2–6, 8, 10), drums (1, 5, 6, 7, 10), additional synths (1, 7, 9), additional drums (2–4, 8)
- Brett Shaw – Rhodes (1), synths (3, 4), programming (track 6), bass (7), additional synths (track 6, 7), additional drums (3, 4), additional percussion (8), Co Production (3)
- Thomas Bartlett – piano (1, 2, 7), Mellotron (1, 2, 4, 9), organ (2), synths (4, 7, 9), bass (5, 9), keyboards (5, 8), additional synths (8), additional piano (9)
- Andrew Wyatt – bass (1, 9), piano (10), Mellotron (10), additional synths (1)
- Jonathan Wilson – guitars (8), additional drums (1, 7, 8), additional guitar (2)
- Rob Ackroyd – guitars (2, 5, 7), ukulele (3)
- Greg Leisz – pedal steel guitar (2, 5)
- Carla Azar – drums (2)
- Tom Monger – harp (2, 3, 5–8, 10)
- Kamasi Washington – tenor saxophone (3, 4, 8); horns arrangement (3, 4, 8)
- Jamie xx – drums (4), synths (4)
- James Gadson – additional drums (4)
- Jasper Randall – vocal contracting (5)
- Angela Parrish – backing vocals (5)
- Leslie Stevens – backing vocals (5)
- Sampha Sisay – piano (6)
- Tobias Jesso Jr. – additional keyboards (6), piano (9)
- Josh Tillman – additional guitar (8)
- Nathan Willett – backing vocals (8)
- Lu Lu McJunkins – cello (8)

Technical

- Emile Haynie – recording, additional recording (7)
- Brett Shaw – recording (1–9)
- Tim Montague – additional recording (2, 9)
- Morgan Stratton – additional recording (2, 5)
- Michael Harris – additional recording (2, 4, 5)
- Keith Gretlein – additional recording (3, 4, 8)
- Zachary Zajdel – assistant engineering (2, 5)
- Christopher Cerullo – assistant engineering (2, 4, 5)
- Derrick Stockwell – assistant engineering (3, 4, 8)
- Matt Mysko – assistant engineering (7)
- Tom Elmhirst – mixing
- John Davis – mastering (1, 3–10)
- Bob Ludwig – mastering (2)

Orchestra

- Sally Herbert – arrangement and conducting
- Tom Bailey – recording
- John Prestage – assistant engineering
- Olli Cunningham – score supervision
- Isobel Griffiths – contracting
- Amy Stewart – assistant contracting
- Everton Nelson – leading

Artwork

- Brian Roettinger – art direction
- Tom Beard – photography
- Florence Welch – drawing

== Charts ==
=== Weekly charts ===
Chart (2018)	Peak position
Australian Albums (ARIA)	2
Austrian Albums (Ö3 Austria)	3
Belgian Albums (Ultratop Flanders)	1
Belgian Albums (Ultratop Wallonia)	6
Canadian Albums (Billboard)	2
Czech Albums (ČNS IFPI)	26
Dutch Albums (Album Top 100)	6
Finnish Albums (Suomen virallinen lista)	16
French Albums (SNEP)	19
German Albums (Offizielle Top 100)	5
Greek Albums (IFPI)	17
Hungarian Albums (MAHASZ)	24
Irish Albums (IRMA)	2
Italian Albums (FIMI)	6
New Zealand Albums (RMNZ)	2
Norwegian Albums (VG-lista)	5
Polish Albums (ZPAV)	3
Portuguese Albums (AFP)	5
Scottish Albums (Official Charts)	1
South Korean International Albums (Gaon)	4
Spanish Albums (Promusicae)	4
Swedish Albums (Sverigetopplistan)	9
Swiss Albums (Schweizer Hitparade)	2
UK Albums (Official Charts)	2
US Billboard 200	2
US Top Alternative Albums (Billboard)	1
US Top Rock Albums (Billboard)	1
US Indie Store Album Sales (Billboard)	4

=== Year-end charts ===
Chart (2018)	Position
Australian Albums (ARIA)	79
Belgian Albums (Ultratop Flanders)	31
Belgian Albums (Ultratop Wallonia)	189
UK Albums (OCC)	56
US Top Rock Albums (Billboard)	53

Chart (2019)	Position
Belgian Albums (Ultratop Flanders)	187

== Certifications and sales ==
Region	Certification	Certified units/sales
New Zealand (RMNZ)	Gold	7,500^{‡}
Poland (ZPAV)	Gold	10,000^{‡}
United Kingdom (BPI)	Gold	100,000^{‡}
^{‡} Sales+streaming figures based on certification alone.
