= Autumn de Wilde =

American photographer (born 1970)

- Born: October 21, 1970 (age 55); Woodstock, New York, U.S.
- Education: Los Angeles City College
- Occupation: Photographer • director
- Years active: 1990–present
- Spouse: Aaron Sperske (divorced)
- Children: Arrow de Wilde
- Father: Jerry de Wilde

Autumn de Wilde (born October 21, 1970) is an American photographer and film director most notable for her portraiture and commercial work photography of musicians, as well as her music video works. In 2020 she directed her first feature film, Emma.

== Early life ==
De Wilde was born on October 21, 1970, in Woodstock, New York. Her father, Jerry de Wilde, is an art and commercial photographer most noted for his photos of Jimi Hendrix and other musicians at the Monterey Pop Festival, and other icons of the 1960s. She was raised in Los Angeles, California, with her younger brother.

Her mother, Mary, lived in England, prompting De Wilde's fascination with English culture as a self-proclaimed Anglophile. This led to her debut film, Emma, based on the novel by Jane Austen of the same name.

She studied theater at Los Angeles City College, and was informally taught photography by her father.

== Career ==
Autumn de Wilde initially intended to go into theater. When performing political theater for Lollapalooza in 1995, she experienced heat stroke. Beck allowed her to cool off in his tour bus. Using the skills she'd learned from her father, she took pictures of Beck, who then encouraged her to pursue photography.

She has since become known as a celebrity photographer, and has photographed album artwork for Miranda Cosgrove, Elliott Smith, She & Him, Jenny Lewis with the Watson Twins, The Raconteurs, The White Stripes, Fiona Apple, Beck, Built to Spill, Wilco, Monsters of Folk, New Found Glory, and Childish Gambino. Her portrait subjects include Willie Nelson, Sean Watkins, Ryan Adams, Sonic Youth, Tegan and Sara, and Wolfmother. Her photos have appeared on the cover of Spin magazine and in the pages of Rolling Stone, Filter, Nylon, Los Angeles Times, Entertainment Weekly, and The New York Times.

Through Beck she was able to meet Elliott Smith, with whom she become close. He also complimented her work, and encouraged her to go into directing by telling his crew that if she did not direct his music videos, he simply would not do them. In 2007 Chronicle Books released a book, Elliott Smith, that includes de Wilde's photographs of Smith.

She has since directed music videos for Beck, The Decemberists, Florence and the Machine, Spoon, Ingrid Michaelson, The Raconteurs, Rilo Kiley and Death Cab for Cutie. Her live concert documentary work includes The Flaming Lips, Spoon, and the Arcade Fire. She has also documented couture designers Kate and Laura Mulleavy of Rodarte.

In 2010, de Wilde provided commentary on a series of reissues of the back catalog of Nick Cave & The Bad Seeds, appearing in the accompanying documentaries entitled Do You Love Me Like I Love You.

In 2011, her work was extensively featured in the limited edition deluxe box version of The Decemberists' album The King Is Dead. It included her one-of-a-kind Polaroid photograph from the Impossible Project/Decemberists series, and a 72-page hardcover book with over 250 of her Polaroid photos and illustrations by Carson Ellis.

De Wilde made her directorial feature film debut with the 2020 film Emma., adapted from Jane Austen's novel of the same name, starring Anya Taylor-Joy. She previously directed an interlude segment of the HBO documentary Six by Sondheim, which incorporated the song "Send in the Clowns", performed by Audra McDonald and Will Swenson.

In 2022, De Wilde photographed Florence Welch for Vogue UK ahead of the release of Florence and the Machine's album Dance Fever.

== Personal life ==
De Wilde was married to drummer Aaron Sperske. Footage from their wedding appeared in the music video for "By Your Side" by Beachwood Sparks. Their daughter, Arrow de Wilde, is the lead singer for the Los Angeles–based band Starcrawler.

De Wilde has arthritis necessitating the use of a cane. Her current cane is styled after one owned by Henri de Toulouse-Lautrec that holds a shot of whiskey and an accompanying shot glass, found in a London umbrella shop by asking for their "weirdest cane".

== Filmography ==
- Emma (2020)

== Awards and nominations ==
Year	Award	Category	Project	Result	Ref.
2020	Boston Society of Film Critics	Best New Filmmaker	Emma.	Nominated	
2020	Hollywood Critics Association	Best Female Filmmaker	Emma.	Nominated	
2020	Indiana Film Journalists Association	Breakout of the Year	Emma.	Nominated	

== See also ==
- List of female film and television directors

== Bibliography ==
- de Wilde, Autumn (2007). Elliott Smith (1st ed.). San Francisco, California: Chronicle Books. ISBN 9780811857994.
