= Dave Audé discography =

This is the discography for American electronic musician Dave Audé.

== Albums ==
- Audacious (2006)
- 2 Audacious (2009)
- Audacious 3 (2011)
- Audacious Summer 2011 Sampler (2011)
- Audacious 4 (2013)
- Audacious Summer Vol. 1 (2014)
- Audacious Vol. 5 (2016)
- Audacious Summer Vol. 2 (2017)
- Shiny Things (2021)
- Motions LP (2022)
- Audé Club Fitness (2023)
- Club Audacious Vol. 1 (2024)
- TRACKS, Vol. 1 (2025)

== Singles ==
- 1996 "Stop/Go" (as D'Still'D)
- 1996 "Free/Lunatix" (in group Disfunktional)
- 1997 "L-O-V-E" (in group Disfunktional)
- 1999 "That Zipper Track" (as Needle Damage)
- 1999 "Push That Thing"
- 2000 "I Can't Wait"
- 2000 "Drowning" (as Cleveland Lounge)
- 2000 "Rush Hour"
- 2002 "I Don't Want Nobody" (as Jada)
- 2003 "The Zone" (as Extension 119)
- 2006 "Common Ground" (with Tall Paul and Sisely Treasure)
- 2007 "Make It Last" (with Jessica Sutta)
- 2008 "Grass Is Greener" (with Sisely Treasure)
- 2009 "Lie to Ourselves" (with Christopher Lawrence and Jen Lasher)
- 2010 "Figure It Out" (with Isha Coco)
- 2010 "Dancin' Circles" (with David Garcia and Sisely Treasure)
- 2011 "Holdin' On" (with Elijah)
- 2011 "That You Like" (with Sisely Treasure)
- 2011 "I'm Still Hot" (with Luciana)
- 2012 "Never Forget" (with Lena Katina of t.A.T.u.)
- 2012 "Something For The Weekend" (with Luciana)
- 2013 "Hold Me" Yoko Ono (featuring Dave Audé)
- 2013 "Bullet" Rokelle (featuring Dave Audé)
- 2013 "Electricity & Drums (Bad Boy)" (featuring Akon and Luciana)
- 2013 "Hustlin'" (Crazibiza and Dave Audé featuring Vassy)
- 2013 "Take Me Away" Rokelle (featuring Dave Audé)
- 2013 "Satellite" Justin Caruso and AUDÉ (featuring Christine Novelli)
- 2014 "Aftermath (Here We Go)" Dave Audé featuring Andy Bell
- 2014 "You Only Talk in #hashtag" featuring Luciana
- 2014 "Tears" Justin Caruso and Dave Aude featuring Miss Palmer
- 2014 "Sweeter" featuring Porcelain Black
- 2014 "Tokyo Style" FUTURE BOYZ (featuring Dave Aude and Vassy)
- 2015 "Im Gonna Get You" featuring Jessica Sutta
- 2015 "Step It Up" RuPaul (featuring Dave Aude)
- 2015 "Te Quiero" Claydee (featuring Dave Aude)
- 2015 "Circles"
- 2015 "You Have to Believe" featuring Olivia Newton-John and Chloe Lattanzi
- 2015 "I'm Burning Up" Karine Hannah / Dave Aude
- 2016 "True Original" featuring Andy Bell
- 2016 "Love Me Like You Mean It" feat Kelsea Ballerini
- 2016 "Kill Em With Kindness" (Writer) Selena Gomez
- 2016 "Unwritten" Veronica Bravo (featuring Dave Aude)
- 2016 "Sweet Dreams" featuring Skylar Stecker (in group JX Riders)
- 2016 "Back 2 Love" with JVMIE
- 2016 "Yeah Yeah" with Luciana
- 2017 "Hiccup" featuring Sisterwife (in group JX Riders)
- 2017 "All the Rules" featuring Ben Thornewill
- 2017 "Love My People" with Crown and The M.O.B.
- 2018 "Perfect to Me" featuring King Brown
- 2018 "Flakka Flakka" with Will Sparks and Luciana
- 2019 "Pacman" featuring Sam Tinnesz
- 2020 "Watching You Watching Me" featuring Luciana
- 2020 "Coyote Ugly Megamix" with LeAnn Rimes
- 2021 "You Only Talk in Hashtag" (Dave Aude Remix) with Luciana
- 2021 "I'm Still Hot" (Dave Aude Remix) with Luciana
- 2021 "Elevating Love" with Nicole Markson
- 2022 "This is Our Time" with Nick Clow
- 2022 "It's Your Body" with Nicole Markson
- 2022 "Break Out" with Jeffrey James
- 2022 "This Is My House" with Nicole Markson
- 2022 "Neon Moon" with Cody Belew
- 2022 "Motions" with Zee Machine
- 2022 "Uninvited" with LeAnn Rimes
- 2022 "In the Air Tonight" with Nicole Markson
- 2022 "Don't We Both Look Dumb" with Halston Dare
- 2023 "What A Life" with Jeffrey James
- 2023 "Retograde" Jeffrey James (Writer)
- 2023 "Me & U" featuring DYSON
- 2024 "Self Love Symphony" with Kendra Erika and Chloe Lattanzi
- 2024 "Push That Thing" 25th Anniversary version
- 2024 "Need You Now" with Sarah Potenza
- 2024 "Pride (In the Name of Love)" with Andy Bell, Crystal Waters, Sarah Potenza, Wyn Starks, Plumb, Zee Machine and Greg Gould
- 2024 "Nothings Gonna Stop Us Now" with Sarah Potenza
- 2024 "Here Now" with Pat Premier
- 2024 "COWBOYS" with Preston Wayne
- 2024 "White Christmas" with Sarah Potenza
- 2025 "Superhuman" with LYRICALMAR
- 2025 "Invisible" with Clay Aiken
- 2025 "Do It Lady" with Chit
- 2025 "O Holy Night" with Sarah Potenza
- 2025 "Baby Come Home" with Crystal Waters
- 2026 "Kiss You All Over" with Sarah Potenza
- 2026 "Make It Last" (New Version) with Jessica Sutta
- 2026 "Freedom" with Sarah Potenza

== Remixes ==
The following is an incomplete list of songs with official remixes released by Dave Audé, ordered by year:

- 1996 DJ Keoki – "Caterpillar"
- 1996 Elli Mac – "Celebrate" (Dave Aude Mad Mix)
- 1996 E.K.O. – "De La Casa" (as D'Still'D)
- 1996 Progression – "If You Believe" (in group Disfunktional)
- 1996 Kellee – "My Love '96" (as D'Still'D)
- 1996 Eden featuring Callaghan – "Lift Me" (Dave Aude Mad Mix)
- 1996 Dubstar – "Elevator Song" (as D'Still'D)
- 1996 Gypsy Queens – "Paradise" (as D'Still'D)
- 1996 Future Breeze – "Why Don't You Dance With Me" (as D'Still'D)
- 1997 Space - "Female of the Species" (as D'Still'D)
- 1997 Mighty Dub Katz – "It's Just Another Groove (I Think That We Should Get Back Together)" (in group Disfunktional)
- 1997 Discfunktional – "L-O-V-E"
- 1997 Tenth Chapter (Carl Cox) – "Prologue"
- 1997 Tall Paul – "Rock Da House" (as D'Still'D)
- 1997 Temple featuring Allen Hidalgo – "The Message"
- 1997 Deni Hines – "I Like The Way"
- 1998 Barenaked Ladies – "One Week"
- 1998 Sabrina Johnston - "Reasons" (with Mohamed Moretta)
- 1998 N'n'G featuring Kallaghan - "Right Before My Eyes"
- 1998 Orgy – "Blue Monday"
- 1998 Mystic 3 – "Something's Goin' On"
- 1998 Sparks - "The No. 1 Song In Heaven"
- 1998 Happy Rhodes – "Roy"
- 1999 Faith No More – "We Care A Lot"
- 1999 2 Eivissa – "Shattered Dreams"
- 1999 Radical Playaz – "The Hook"
- 1999 E.K.O. – "Keep It Shining"
- 1999 Freshmäka – "I Am The Freshmäka"
- 1999 Pat Hodges – "Rushin' To Meet You"
- 1999 Shawn Christopher – "Don't Lose The Magic"
- 1999 Shawn Christopher – "Sweet Freedom"
- 1999 Baby Blue – "Too Loud"
- 1999 Fifty Fifty – "Tonight (I'm Dreaming)"
- 2000 A Tribe Called Quest - "Public Enemy" (with DJ Dan)
- 2000 Elisha La'Verne - "Give Me A Reason"
- 2000 Snake River Conspiracy – "Breed"
- 2000 Cleveland Lounge – "Drowning"
- 2000 Tall Paul – "Freebase"
- 2000 Freshmaka – "La La La"
- 2000 CeCe Peniston – "Lifetime to Love" (as Mr Nice Guy)
- 2000 Yomanda – "On The Level"
- 2000 Everlasting Throbbing Poppers – "Pulsing"
- 2000 Mystic 3 – "Something's Goin' On"
- 2000 Vimana – "We Came"
- 2000 Madonna – "Don't Tell Me"
- 2000 Madonna – "Music"
- 2001 LeAnn Rimes – "I Need You"
- 2001 Ferry Corsten – "Punk" (in group Rich Kidz)
- 2001 Tall Paul – "It's Alright"
- 2001 DJ Keoki – "Relax"
- 2002 Tall Paul vs INXS - "Precious Heart" (in group Rich Kidz)
- 2002 Cirrus – "Boomerang" (in group Rich Kidz)
- 2002 Las Ketchup - "The Ketchup Song (Asereje)"
- 2002 t.A.T.u. – "All The Things She Said" (as Extension 119)
- 2002 Rose Moore - "Why / E Si Do Maya E Si"
- 2002 DJ Keoki – "Jealousy"
- 2003 Pink and William Orbit - "Feel Good Time"
- 2003 Fleetwood Mac - "Go Your Own Way"
- 2003 Michelle Branch - "Breathe"
- 2003 t.A.T.u. – "Not Gonna Get Us"
- 2003 t.A.T.u. – "30 Minutes" (as Extension 119)
- 2003 Baha Men – "Handle It"
- 2003 Enrique Iglesias featuring Kelis – "Not in Love"
- 2003 Sting – "Send Your Love"
- 2003 Extension 119 – "The Zone"
- 2003 No Doubt – "It's My life"
- 2003 Becky Baeling – "Getaway" (as Extension 119)
- 2003 Annie Lennox – "Wonderful"
- 2003 GusGus - "David"
- 2004 Green Day - "Ringtones" (with DJ Dan)
- 2004 Big & Rich - "Save A Horse, Ride A Cowboy" (with DJ Dan)
- 2004 Ashlee Simpson - "Shadow"
- 2004 Argento – "Disco Geiger"
- 2004 Ono – "Everyman… Everywoman…"
- 2004 Nemesis - "Let Me Help You Out"
- 2004 TNT – "Dynamite (Theme From 'LA DJ')"
- 2004 Cherie – "Older Than My Years"
- 2004 Cherie – "I'm Ready"
- 2004 Sugababes – "Hole In the Head" (in group Dummies)
- 2005 Midori - "The Illusion"
- 2005 Britney Spears – "I'm a Slave 4 U" (for B In The Mix: The Remixes)
- 2005 Sting – "Stolen Car (Take Me Dancing)"
- 2005 t.A.T.u. – "All About Us"
- 2005 Gorillaz – "DARE"
- 2005 Pepper Mashay with Digital Trip – "Send Me An Angel"
- 2005 The Veronicas – "4ever" (as Claude le Gache)
- 2005 Alanis Morissette – "Crazy" (as Claude le Gache)
- 2005 Rob Thomas - "Ever The Same"
- 2005 Clear Static – "Make-Up Sex" (as Claude le Gache)
- 2005 The Pussycat Dolls – "Don't Cha" (with DJ Dan)
- 2005 Lindsay Lohan – "Confessions of a Broken Heart (Daughter to Father)"
- 2005 Yoko Ono – "Give Peace A Chance" (with DJ Dan)
- 2005 Crime Mob – "Steilettos (Pumps)"
- 2005 Depeche Mode – "Precious" (with DJ Dan)
- 2005 New Order – "Guilt Is A Useless Emotion" (with DJ Dan)
- 2005 New Order – "Krafty" (with DJ Dan)
- 2005 The Lovemakers - "Prepare For The Fight" (in group Dummies)
- 2005 Ringside – "Tired Of Being Sorry" (in group Dummies)
- 2005 Lunascape – "Mindstalking"
- 2005 Jojo – "Leave (Get Out)"
- 2005 Nikka Costa - "Til' I Get To You"
- 2005 Coldplay – "Talk"
- 2005 Head Automatica - "Beating Heart Baby"
- 2006 Gwen Stefani - "Wind It Up"
- 2006 +44 - "When Your Heart Stops Beating" (as Claude Le Gache)
- 2006 The Pussycat Dolls - "Stickwitu"
- 2006 Chelo – "Cha Cha"
- 2006 Beyoncé – "Upgrade U"
- 2006 Jamie Kennedy and Stu Stone – "Circle Circle Dot Dot"
- 2006 Jupiter Rising – "Go!"
- 2006 Jessica Vale – "Disco Libido"
- 2006 MYNC Project and Danny Rampling – "Strobelight"
- 2006 Paris Hilton – "Turn It Up" (with DJ Dan)
- 2006 Paris Hilton – "Turn You On" (as "Claude le Gache")
- 2006 Paris Hilton - "Nothing In This World"
- 2006 Robin – "The DJ Made Me Do It"
- 2006 KoЯn – "Politics" (as Claude le Gache)
- 2006 Nemesis – "Number One In Heaven"
- 2006 Mobile – "Out of My Head" (as Claude le Gache)
- 2006 Rock Kills Kid - "Paralyzed" (as Claude le Gache)
- 2006 The Veronicas – "Everything I'm Not" (as Claude le Gache)
- 2006 Nitelife - "Music Is The Answer" (with Tall Paul)
- 2006 Avant featuring Nicole Scherzinger - "Lie About Us"
- 2006 The Grates - "Silence Is Golden"
- 2007 Rooney - "When Did Your Heart Go Missing?" (as Claude le Gache)
- 2007 Nicole Scherzinger featuring will.i.am – "Baby Love"
- 2007 Nelly Furtado – "All Good Things (Come to an End)"
- 2007 Jessi Malay featuring Young Joc - "Booty Bangs" (with DJ Dan)
- 2007 Delerium - "Lost And Found" (with DJ Dan)
- 2007 Enrique Iglesias – "Do You Know? (The Ping Pong Song)" (with DJ Dan)
- 2007 Kimberley Locke – "Band Of Gold"
- 2007 Valeria featuring Aria – "Girl I Told Ya"
- 2007 Suite 117 – "Smaller"
- 2007 Kelly Clarkson- "Never Again"
- 2007 Jacinta – "Can't Keep It A Secret"
- 2007 Hilary Duff – "With Love" (with Richard Vission)
- 2007 Enrique Iglesias – "Escape"
- 2007 Enrique Iglesias – "Tired Of Being Sorry" (in group Dummies)
- 2007 Young Love – "Find A New Way"
- 2007 Yoko Ono – "You're the One" (as Claude Le Gache)
- 2007 Danity Kane – "Show Stopper"
- 2007 Stevie Nicks – "Stand Back"
- 2007 Gabriel & Dresden – "New Path" (featuring Jan Burton)
- 2007 Pussycat Dolls – "Buttons"
- 2007 Samantha Jade – "Eyes On Me"
- 2007 Kill Hannah - "Crazy Angel"
- 2007 Tiffany - "Just Another Day"
- 2007 Meck featuring Dino - "Feels Like Home"
- 2008 Inaya Day – "Say You Will"
- 2008 Hilary Duff – "Stranger" (with Richard Vission)
- 2008 DJ Timbo and Friends – "GoGo Girl"
- 2008 Blake Lewis – "How Many Words"
- 2008 Enrique Iglesias – "Away"
- 2008 Lady Gaga – "The Fame"
- 2008 KoЯn – "Evolution"
- 2008 Pussycat Dolls – "I Hate This Part"
- 2008 will.i.am – "One More Chance"
- 2008 Yoko Ono – "Give Peace A Chance"
- 2008 Danity Kane - "Bad Girl"
- 2008 Colette– "If"
- 2008 Ashlee Simpson – "Outta My Head (Ay Ya Ya)"
- 2008 Ashlee Simpson – "Little Miss Obsessive"
- 2008 Leana – "Embrace Me"
- 2008 Lady Gaga – "Poker Face"
- 2008 Lady Gaga – "LoveGame"
- 2008 Sultan & NedShepard featuring Kuba One – "Jeopardy"
- 2008 Beyoncé Knowles – "Single Ladies (Put a Ring on It)"
- 2008 The Pussycat Dolls – "When I Grow Up"
- 2008 Craig David – "Hot Stuff (Let's Dance)"
- 2008 Vinny Troia - "Magic"
- 2008 Janice Grace – "Wanna Be Beautiful"
- 2008 Girls Aloud – "The Promise"
- 2008 Girlicious – "Baby Doll"
- 2008 Girlicious – "Like Me"
- 2008 Girlicious – "Stupid Sh**"
- 2008 Donna Summer – "Fame (The Game)"
- 2008 Sir Ivan - "For What It's Worth"
- 2008 Lenna - "Elle Est Tres L.A."
- 2008 Sarah Atereth - "It Doesn't Take Much"
- 2008 Nikka Costa - "Stuck To You"
- 2008 Gina Star featuring Deanna – "Rock With Me"
- 2009 Ashley Tisdale – "It's Alright, It's OK"
- 2009 Backstreet Boys – "Straight Through My Heart"
- 2009 Beyoncé Knowles – "Halo"
- 2009 Bad Boy Bill – "Do What U Like (feat. Alyssa Palmer)"
- 2009 Kelly Clarkson - "My Life Would Suck Without You"
- 2009 Mena Heaven – "Open Up Your Mind"
- 2009 Carmen Reece – "Right Here"
- 2009 Pussycat Dolls – "Bottle Pop"
- 2009 Chrisette Michele – "Epiphany"
- 2009 Dean Coleman featuring DCLA – "I Want You"
- 2009 Cinema Bizarre – "Lovesongs (They Kill Me)"
- 2009 Erika Jayne – "Give You Everything"
- 2009 Eva Simons – "Silly Boy"
- 2009 Heidi Montag – "More is More"
- 2009 Sean Kingston – "Fire Burning"
- 2009 Jackson 5 – "Dancing Machine" (with DJ Havana Brown)
- 2009 Janet Jackson – "Make Me"
- 2009 Jonas Brothers – "Paranoid"
- 2009 Julien-K – "Kick The Bass"
- 2009 La Roux – "Bulletproof"
- 2009 Lady Gaga – "Paparazzi"
- 2009 Mary Mary – "God In Me"
- 2009 New Boyz – "You're a Jerk"
- 2009 Mr Hudson featuring Kanye West – "Supernova"
- 2009 Noisettes – "Don't Upset The Rhythm"
- 2009 Oceana – "Body Rock"
- 2009 Paradiso Girls – "Patron Tequila"
- 2009 Plumb – "Hang On"
- 2009 Pussycat Dolls – "Hush Hush"
- 2009 Rob Zombie – "What"
- 2009 Diddy-Dirty Money - "Angels"
- 2009 U2 – "Magnificent"
- 2009 V Factory – "Love Struck"
- 2009 Matt Goss – "Evil"
- 2009 Yoko Ono – "I'm Not Getting Enough"
- 2009 Ysa Ferrer – "Last Zoom"
- 2009 Yulianna – "Racecar"
- 2009 Atom – "Satellite"
- 2009 Fans Of Jimmy Century – "Lola Like This"
- 2009 Esmee Denters – "Outta Here"
- 2009 Gia Bella – "Back It Up"
- 2009 Sun – "Fancy Free"
- 2009 Information Society – "Seeds Of Pain"
- 2009 Ralphi Rosario featuring Shawn Christopher – "Everybody Shake It"
- 2009 Serena Ryder - "Got Your Number"
- 2010 Vinny Troia featuring Jaidene Veda – "Magic"
- 2010 Erika Jayne – "Pretty Mess"
- 2010 Erika Jayne – "Sex Shooter"
- 2010 Lady Gaga – "Bad Romance"
- 2010 Selena Gomez & The Scene – "Naturally"
- 2010 Yoko Ono – "Give Me Something"
- 2010 Lara Fabian – "Toutes les Femmes En Moi" (English and French)
- 2010 Charice – "Pyramid"
- 2010 Black Gold – "Shine"
- 2010 Iyaz – "Solo"
- 2010 Nadine Coyle – "Put Your Hands Up"
- 2010 Vinny Troia – "Do For Love"
- 2010 The Disco Biscits – "On Time"
- 2010 Mary J. Blige – "I Am"
- 2010 Kelis – "Acapella"
- 2010 Goldfrapp – "Alive"
- 2010 OneRepublic – "All The Right Moves"
- 2010 Lady Gaga – "Alejandro
- 2010 Alexis Jordan – "Happiness"
- 2010 Taio Cruz featuring Ke$ha – "Dirty Picture"
- 2010 Ke$ha – "Your Love Is My Drug"
- 2010 Rihanna – "Rockstar 101"
- 2010 Carmen Reece – Raindrop
- 2010 Vinny Troia featuring Jaidene Veda – "Do For Love"
- 2010 Ecotek – "Into The Night"
- 2010 Zayra – "V.I.P."
- 2010 Sarah McLachlan – "Loving You is Easy"
- 2010 Kaci Battaglia – '"Body Shots"
- 2010 Charice – "I Love You"
- 2010 Selena Gomez & The Scene – "Round & Round"
- 2010 Katy Perry – "Teenage Dream"
- 2010 Giulietta (singer) – "Vertigo"
- 2010 Yoko Ono – "Wouldnit (I'm a Star)"
- 2010 Paradiso Girls – "Who's My Bitch"
- 2010 Plumb – "Beautiful History"
- 2010 Beach Girls 5 – "Scratch"
- 2010 BT – "The Emergency"
- 2010 Richard Vission and Static Revenger and Luciana – "I Like That"
- 2010 J786 – "Rock Tonight"
- 2010 Nicole Scherzinger – "Poison"
- 2010 Cher – "You Haven't Seen the Last of Me"
- 2010 The Black Eyed Peas – "The Time (Dirty Bit)"
- 2010 Erika Jayne – "One Hot Pleasure"
- 2010 Ke$ha – "Animal"
- 2010 Natasha Bedingfield – "Strip Me"
- 2010 Selena Gomez & The Scene – "A Year Without Rain"
- 2010 Nadine Coyle – "Hands Up"
- 2011 J786 – "Outtacontrol"
- 2010 Edei – "In My Bed"
- 2011 Rihanna – "S&M"
- 2011 Katy Perry featuring Kanye West – "E.T"
- 2011 LeAnn Rimes – "Crazy Women"
- 2011 Sultan & Ned Shepard featuring Nadia Ali – "Call My Name"
- 2011 Ono – "Move on Fast"
- 2011 Jennifer Hudson – "Where You At"
- 2011 Wanessa – "Stuck On Repeat"
- 2011 Andrea Rosario – "We Own The Night"
- 2011 Selena Gomez & The Scene – "Who Says"
- 2011 Jennifer Lopez featuring Lil Wayne – "I'm Into You"
- 2011 Lady Gaga – "Judas"
- 2011 Innerpartysystem – "Not Getting Any Better"
- 2011 Beyoncé – "Run The World (Girls)"
- 2011 Frankmusik featuring Far East Movement – "Do It in the AM"
- 2011 Christian TV – "I'm In Love"
- 2011 Mayra Veronica – "Freak Like Me"
- 2011 Blush featuring Snoop Dogg – "Undivided"
- 2011 Nicole Scherzinger – "Don't Hold Your Breath"
- 2011 Lil Larry – "Beautiful Thing"
- 2011 Bera – "Favourite Things"
- 2011 Digital Freq and Lizzie Curious – "Last Train To Nowhere"
- 2011 Colette Carr – "(We Do It) Primo"
- 2011 Yoko Ono – "Talking to the Universe"
- 2011 Jessica Sutta – "Show Me"
- 2011 NERVO – "We're All No One"
- 2011 Luciana – "I'm Still Hot"
- 2011 KoЯn – "Narcissistic Cannibal" (featuring Skrillex and Kill The Noise)
- 2011 Guinevere – "Crazy Crazy"
- 2011 Selena Gomez & The Scene – "Love You Like a Love Song"
- 2011 Blush – "Dance On"
- 2011 Micro vs. Dhany - "On Your Road"
- 2011 Paris and Destinee – "True Love"
- 2011 Bera – "Light It Up"
- 2011 Rihanna – "You Da One"
- 2011 Audio Playground – "Famous"
- 2011 Neon Hitch – "Fuck U Betta"
- 2011 Carishma – "Glow In The Dark"
- 2011 will.i.am feat Mick Jagger and Jennifer Lopez – "T.H.E."
- 2011 Diddy-Dirty Money feat Skylar Grey - "Coming Home"
- 2011 Derek Bramble featuring Amanda - "Escape"
- 2011 Nesty La Mente Maestra featuring Isha Coco "Latin Flow (Drive)"
- 2012 Eva – "Body On Mine"
- 2012 Coldplay – "Charlie Brown"
- 2012 Lena Katina – "Never Forget"
- 2012 Adam Lambert – "Better Than I Know Myself"
- 2012 Carishma – "Like A Rainbow"
- 2012 China Anne McClain – "Unstoppable"
- 2012 Yoko Ono – "She Gets Down on Her Knees"
- 2012 Madonna – "Girl Gone Wild"
- 2012 One Direction – "What Makes You Beautiful"
- 2012 Tammy Wynette – "Stand By Your Man"
- 2012 Erika Jayne – "United"
- 2012 Morel – "I'm So Low"
- 2012 Selena Gomez & The Scene – "Hit The Lights"
- 2012 Blush – "All Stars"
- 2012 Yoko Ono – "I'm Moving On"
- 2012 Taryn Manning – "Send Me Your Love"
- 2012 Midnight Red – "Hell Yeah"
- 2012 Wonder Girls featuring Akon – "Like Money"
- 2012 Jeffree Star – "Prom Night!"
- 2012 Audio Playground – "Emergency"
- 2012 Frenchie Davis – "Love's Got A Hold On Me"
- 2012 Mandy Capristo - "The Way I Like It"
- 2012 One Direction – "Live While We're Young"
- 2012 Conor Maynard featuring Ne-Yo – "Turn Around"
- 2012 Kreayshawn – "Go Hard"
- 2012 Paloma Faith – "Picking Up the Pieces"
- 2012 Chris Brown – "Don't Judge Me"
- 2012 Tanlines – "All Of Me"
- 2012 Vassy – "We Are Young"
- 2012 Rihanna – "Diamonds"
- 2012 Havana Brown – "Big Banana"
- 2012 Cherry Cherry Boom Boom – "One and Only"
- 2012 Kwanza Jones – "Supercharged"
- 2012 Penguin Prison - "Don't Fuck With My Money"
- 2012 Irina – "Something About You"
- 2012 Irina – "Believe"
- 2012 will.i.am featuring Britney Spears – "Scream & Shout"
- 2013 Mayra Verónica – "Ay Mama Mia"
- 2013 Stacey Jackson – "Pointing Fingers"
- 2013 Asher Monroe – "Here With You"
- 2013 Laura laRue – "Free Love"
- 2013 Juanes – "Cumbia Sexy"
- 2013 Plumb – "Need You Now"
- 2013 Ciara – "Body Party"
- 2013 Selena Gomez – "Come & Get It"
- 2013 Matthew Koma – "One Night"
- 2013 Irina – "One Last Kiss"
- 2013 Stefano Pain featuring Lucia – "Somewhere In The Sky"
- 2013 Luciana – "U B The Bass"
- 2013 LeAnn Rimes – "Spitfire"
- 2013 LeAnn Rimes – "You Ruined Me"
- 2013 Yoko Ono – "Walking On Thin Ice"
- 2013 Ikon and Exodus featuring Sisely Treasure – "Shadow of the Sun"
- 2013 Colette Carr – "Never Gonna Happen"
- 2013 Asher Monroe – "Hush Hush"
- 2013 YLA featuring Vanessa Hudgens – "$$$EX"
- 2013 Havana Brown – "Flashing Lights"
- 2013 Meital – "Give Us Back Love"
- 2013 Pet Shop Boys – "Love Is A Bourgeois Construct"
- 2013 Pearl Future – "I Can't Get Enough Of You"
- 2013 Celine Dion – "Loved Me Back to Life"
- 2013 LeAnn Rimes featuring Rob Thomas & Jeff Beck – "Gasoline & Matches"
- 2013 Vassy – "Mad"
- 2013 Erasure – "Gaudete"
- 2013 Noelia – "Mind Blown"
- 2013 Alla Ray – "On Fire"
- 2013 My Crazy Girlfriend – "Go F**k Yourself"
- 2013 Kimberly Davis – "With You"
- 2013 Sage The Gemini featuring Iamsu! – "Gas Pedal"
- 2013 Lea Michele – "Cannonball"
- 2013 FAKY – "Better Without You"
- 2013 Mel B – "For Once In My Life"
- 2014 Basstoy Presents Dana Divine - "Runnin'"
- 2014 Starling Glow – "We Are Infinite"
- 2014 Starling Glow – "Ignite"
- 2014 Baker – "Not Gonna Wait"
- 2014 Lena Katina – "Lift Me Up"
- 2014 Five Knives – "The Rising"
- 2014 Britney Spears – "Body Ache"
- 2014 Asher Monroe featuring Chris Brown – "Memory"
- 2014 ZZ Ward – "Last Love Song"
- 2014 Enrique Iglesias featuring Pitbull – "I'm a Freak"
- 2014 Havana Brown – "Warrior"
- 2014 Scarlett Rabe – "Battle Cry"
- 2014 Juanes – "La Luz"
- 2014 Zedd featuring Matthew Koma and Miriam Bryant – "Find You"
- 2014 Beyoncé – "Partition"
- 2014 Idina Menzel – "Let It Go"
- 2014 London Rose – "Kick Drum"
- 2014 Nadia Forde – "Love is in the Air"
- 2014 Phunk Investigation – "Sax Shop"
- 2014 The McClymonts – "Here's To You & I"
- 2014 (We Are) Nexus – "Shamelessly"
- 2014 Anise K and Lance Bass featuring Bella Blue – "Walking on Air"
- 2014 Amy Grant – "Baby Baby"
- 2014 Ariana Grande featuring Iggy Azalea - "Problem"
- 2014 Röyksopp and Robyn - "Do It Again"
- 2014 Chris Willis and Joachim Garraud - "One Life"
- 2014 Hilary Duff - "Chasing the Sun"
- 2014 Shara Strand - "RSVP"
- 2014 Harlee featuring Akon - "Dream Warriors"
- 2014 Bastille - "Bad Blood"
- 2014 Dirty Loops - "Hit Me"
- 2014 ONO - "Angel"
- 2014 G.R.L. - "Ugly Heart"
- 2014 (We Are) Nexus - "Better Off Without You"
- 2014 RAC featuring Matthew Koma - "Cheap Sunglasses"
- 2014 Chris Brown featuring Usher and Rick Ross - "New Flame"
- 2014 Cherry Cherry Boom Boom - "A Little Bit Of Love"
- 2014 Sariah - "Aware, Alive, Awake"
- 2014 Nikkole - "Zero"
- 2014 Tinashe - "Pretend"
- 2014 Gia - "World"
- 2014 Ella Henderson - "Ghost"
- 2014 OneRepublic - "I Lived ([RED]) Remix"
- 2015 Selena Gomez - "The Heart Wants What It Wants"
- 2015 Noelia featuring Timbaland - "Spell"
- 2015 Ivy Levan - "Biscuit"
- 2015 Kelly Clarkson - "Heartbeat Song"
- 2015 Katy Tiz - "Whistle (While You Work It)"
- 2015 Marlon Roudette - "When The Beat Drops Out"
- 2015 ONO - "Woman Power"
- 2015 Malea - "One Hot Mess"
- 2015 Dirty Disco featuring Debby Holiday - "Lift"
- 2015 Mark Ronson featuring Bruno Mars - "Uptown Funk!"
- 2015 Skylar Stecker - "Rooftop"
- 2015 David Gray featuring LeAnn Rimes - "Snow In Vegas"
- 2015 Jessica Sutta featuring Rico Love - "Let It Be Love"
- 2015 Nathan Sykes - "Kiss Me Quick"
- 2015 Five Knives - "Savages"
- 2015 Starling Glow - "Caution Tape"
- 2015 Morgan Page featuring Lissie - "Open Heart"
- 2015 Ryan Skyy featuring Niki Darling - "Done"
- 2015 Rachel Platten - "Fight Song"
- 2015 Shelter featuring Frankmusik - "With U"
- 2015 Breanna Rubio - "More Than a Felling"
- 2015 Aggro Santos featuring Andreea Banica - "Red Lips"
- 2015 Nick Jonas - "Teacher"
- 2015 Paul Oakenfold featuring Tawiah - "Lonely Ones"
- 2015 Demi Lovato - "Cool for the Summer"
- 2015 Claire Rasa - "All I Wanted"
- 2015 KC and the Sunshine Band - "I Love You More"
- 2015 Rita Ora featuring Chris Brown - "Body On Me"
- 2015 Linnea - "Turning Away"
- 2015 Paris Hilton - "High Off My Love"
- 2015 Bleona - "Take You Over"
- 2015 Cœur De Pirate - "Carry On"
- 2015 Nytrix - "Take Me Higher"
- 2015 Lucas Nord featuring Tove Lo - "Run On Love"
- 2015 One Direction - "Drag Me Down"
- 2015 Prince Royce featuring Jennifer Lopez and Pitbull - "Back It Up"
- 2015 StoneBridge and Jamie Lee Wilson - "Out Of Nowhere"
- 2015 Mylène Farmer and Sting - "Stolen Car"
- 2015 PHASES - "I'm In Love With My Life"
- 2015 Nelly featuring Jeremih - "The Fix"
- 2015 Lady Gaga - "Til It Happens to You"
- 2015 Adele - "Hello"
- 2016 Mack Z - "I Gotta Dance"
- 2016 Claire Rasa - "Take Me Back"
- 2016 M.E.L - "Jealous"
- 2016 Shawn Hook - "Sound of Your Heart"
- 2016 Nikki Jumper - "Sinful Youth"
- 2016 Rachel Platten - "Stand By You"
- 2016 Inas X - "Love Is"
- 2016 Romina and Christiano Jordano - "Insane"
- 2016 Steve Grand - "We Are the Night"
- 2016 Alexa Aronson featuring Snoop Dogg - "Music Feels Better"
- 2016 Jonas Blue - "Fast Car"
- 2016 Merlin Moon - "Believe"
- 2016 Nick Martin featuring Lauren Bennett - "Reality"
- 2016 Dirtyfreqs and Vassy - "T.U.T.P (Turn up the Party)"
- 2016 Janice Grace - "Save the Planet"
- 2016 Billie Ray Martin - "Glittering Gutter"
- 2016 Erika Jayne - "How Many F**ks?"
- 2016 After Romeo - "Good Things"
- 2016 ZAYN - "Like I Would"
- 2016 Enrique Iglesias feat Wisin - "Duele el Corazón"
- 2016 Eva Swan - "Supreme"
- 2016 Malea - "Earth Angel"
- 2016 We the Kings - "The Story of Tonight"
- 2016 Salt Ashes - "Save It"
- 2016 Zack Zilla - "Don't Stop"
- 2016 Broadway for Orlando - "What the World Needs Now Is Love"
- 2016 Fitz and the Tantrums - "HandClap"
- 2016 Olivia Holt - "Phoenix"
- 2016 Amber Skyes - "Warning Sign"
- 2016 LÉON - "Tired of Talking"
- 2016 The Chainsmokers featuring Halsey - "Closer"
- 2016 Fergie - "M.I.L.F. $"
- 2016 Kristii - "Recovery"
- 2016 Tony Moran feat Jason Walker - "Say Yes"
- 2016 Plumb - "Smoke"
- 2016 John Legend - "Love Me Now"
- 2016 J Sutta - "Distortion"
- 2016 ONO - "Hell in Paradise"
- 2016 LeAnn Rimes - "Long Live Love"
- 2017 Nytrix - "Love Never Died"
- 2017 Sander Kleinenberg featuring DYSON - "Feel Like Home"
- 2017 Alexa Aronson - "Hide & Seek"
- 2017 Rebecca Black - "The Great Divide"
- 2017 Sting - "I Can't Stop Thinking About You"
- 2017 Krewella - "Team"
- 2017 JoLivi - "Love Who You Wanna Love"
- 2017 Little Mix - "Touch"
- 2017 Urban Cone - "Old School"
- 2017 Sting - "50,000"
- 2017 Malea - "You'll Never Fix My Heart"
- 2017 LeAnn Rimes - "Love Is Love Is Love"
- 2017 Rasmus Faber Featuring Linus Norda - "We Laugh We Dance We Cry"
- 2017 Skylar Stecker - "Only Want You"
- 2017 Jennifer Hudson - "Remember Me"
- 2017 JoAnna Michelle - "Too Sophisticated"
- 2017 Aggro Santos - "Bomba"
- 2017 Enrique Iglesias featuring Descemer Bueno, Zion and Lennox - "Súbeme La Radio"
- 2017 Nick Jonas featuring Anne Marie and Mike Posner - "Remember I Told You"
- 2017 DJ Khaled featuring Rihanna and Bryson Tiller - "Wild Thoughts"
- 2017 Nick Caster - "Ride All Night"
- 2017 The Chainsmokers - "Honest"
- 2017 Smash Mouth - "Walkin' on the Sun"
- 2017 Tim Myers - "Lover My Love"
- 2017 Emily Perry - "Boom"
- 2017 The Mavericks - "Brand New Day"
- 2017 Luis Fonsi and Daddy Yankee (featuring Justin Bieber) - "Despacito"
- 2017 OBB - "Mona Lisa"
- 2017 Kesha (featuring The Dap-Kings Horns) - "Woman"
- 2017 Kwaye - "Sweetest Life"
- 2017 The Trash Mermaids - "Cryptic Love"
- 2017 Kelly Clarkson - "Love So Soft"
- 2017 Jimmy D. Robinson and A Flock Of Seagulls - "Pedro"
- 2017 LeAnn Rimes - "Love Line"
- 2017 April Diamond - "Lose Control"
- 2017 Azure - "Too Late"
- 2017 Niall Horan - "Too Much To Ask"
- 2017 Skylar Stecker - "Blame"
- 2018 Demi Lovato - "Tell Me You Love Me"
- 2018 Kendra Erika - "Sublime"
- 2018 WesT - "Personal"
- 2018 Keala Settle - "This Is Me"
- 2018 Sting and Shaggy - "Don't Make Me Wait"
- 2018 The Trash Mermaids - "Xperiel"
- 2018 Sophie Simmons - "Black Mirror"
- 2018 Bleona - "Wicked Love"
- 2018 RABBII - "Majestic"
- 2018 Johnnie Mikel - "Friday Night"
- 2018 Ashley Brinton - "Trouble"
- 2018 The Heroic Enthusiasts - "New York Made Me"
- 2018 Bass Machina - "Overwhelmed"
- 2018 Hilary Roberts - "There For You"
- 2018 Plumb - "Beautifully Broken"
- 2018 Luciana and Nytrix - "Trouble"
- 2018 CliQ featuring Alika - "Wavey"
- 2018 Noah Cyrus and MAX - "Team"
- 2018 Sting and Shaggy - "Gotta Get Back My Baby"
- 2018 John Palumbo featuring ONO - "Hey Mr. President"
- 2018 LeAnn Rimes - "How Do I Live"
- 2018 Backstreet Boys - "Don't Go Breaking My Heart"
- 2018 The Rua - "All I Ever Wanted"
- 2018 Blair St. Clair - "Call My Life"
- 2018 Lizzo - "Boys"
- 2018 JJ Thornhill - "Take Me Back (All the Way Up)"
- 2018 Caroline Kole - "What If"
- 2018 Andreas Moss - "Deep Down Below"
- 2018 Bleona - "I Don't Need Your Love"
- 2018 for KING & COUNTRY - "joy."
- 2018 Diana Ebe - "Chasing"
- 2018 OBB - "Is This A Thing"
- 2018 Plumb - "Crazy About You"
- 2018 LeAnn Rimes - "Joy"
- 2018 Alexander Stewart - "Enamorado"
- 2018 Barbra Streisand - "Don't Lie to Me"
- 2018 Drew Schiff - "It's Just Today"
- 2018 Dion Todd - "Remedy For Insanity"
- 2018 Christine Gordon - "Tidal Wave"
- 2018 Christine Gordon - "Refill"
- 2018 Pentatonix with Maren Morris - "When You Believe"
- 2018 Bright Lights featuring Fito Blanko - "Gringa"
- 2019 Sabrina Carpenter - "Sue Me"
- 2019 Sting and Shaggy - "Just One Lifetime"
- 2019 Reiji Kawaguchi featuring Marty James - "R.O.C.K.M.E."
- 2019 Tania - "Break Up To Make Up"
- 2019 Bleona - "Monster"
- 2019 Broke Royals - "Bad Chemicals"
- 2019 Sara Bareilles - "Fire"
- 2019 Majesty - "Wasted"
- 2019 OBB - "7 Billion"
- 2019 Céline Dion - "Flying on My Own"
- 2019 Temmora featuring Karma - "Fire"
- 2019 Shaggy featuring Jessi Alexander Stewart - "You"
- 2019 Kalendr x Laura Bryna - "Sweet Revenge"
- 2019 Marie-Mai - "Oser Aimer"
- 2019 XIMXIA - "Don't Follow Me"
- 2019 Nicole Markson - "Higher Than Heaven"
- 2019 Maren Morris - "The Bones"
- 2019 Veronica Vega featuring Quavo - "A Million"
- 2019 SHAED - "Trampoline"
- 2019 Kelsea Ballerini - "Miss Me More"
- 2019 Izzy Escobar - "No Boys"
- 2019 Starr - "Red"
- 2019 Alexander Stewart - "Backwards"
- 2020 Alya - "American Beauty"
- 2020 Carys - "Princesses Don't Cry"
- 2020 Andreas Moss featuring Sinclair - "Chaka Khan"
- 2020 Sub-Radio - "Better Than That"
- 2020 Sara Bareilles - "No Such Thing"
- 2020 Betty Reed - "Drunk On You"
- 2020 Guarika featuring Sean Kingston - "I'm Alive"
- 2020 Hilary Roberts - "Good Man"
- 2020 Melanie Pfirrman, Pitbull & IAmChino - "Suda"
- 2020 BlissBliss - "What's Going On?"
- 2020 Lindsay Lohan - "Back to Me"
- 2020 Sting - "Don't Stand So Close To Me"
- 2020 Toni Braxton - "Dance"
- 2020 Nicole Markson - "This Is My House"
- 2020 Barbara Mandrell - "Sleeping Single in a Double Bed"
- 2020 Laura Bryna - "Stars Are Falling"
- 2020 The Killers - "Caution"
- 2020 Maddie & Tae - "Die from a Broken Heart"
- 2020 Josey Greenwell - "Cowboy"
- 2020 Reba McEntire - "Fancy"
- 2020 HeatedXchange - "Outbreak"
- 2020 Cassadee Pope - "Rise and Shine"
- 2020 LeAnn Rimes - "The Right Kind Of Wrong"
- 2020 LeAnn Rimes - "But I Do Love You"
- 2020 LeAnn Rimes - "Can't Fight the Moonlight"
- 2020 LeAnn Rimes - "Please Remember"
- 2020 JP Saxe - "A Little Bit Yours"
- 2021 Chrissy Metz - "Feel Good"
- 2021 LeAnn Rimes - "Throw My Arms Around The World"
- 2021 Christina Grimmie - "Back To Life"
- 2021 Laura Pausini - "Io sì (Seen)"
- 2021 Demi Lovato featuring Ariana Grande - "Met Him Last Night"
- 2021 Laura Bryna - "The Way That It Was"
- 2021 Dierks Bentley - "Black"
- 2021 Brooke Eden - "Got No Choice"
- 2021 Reba McEntire - "I'm Gonna Take That Mountain"
- 2021 Reba McEntire - "Why Haven't I Heard From You"
- 2021 Shab featuring Martinez Twins - "Music To My Heart"
- 2021 Clayton Anderson - "Run Wild"
- 2021 Benjamin J. Alexander Presents - Clap, Clap
- 2021 Kid Moxie - "Big In Japan"
- 2021 Walker Hayes - "Fancy Like"
- 2021 Nikkole - "All Mine"
- 2021 Kaitlyn Dorff - "In My Dreams"
- 2021 Cody Belew - "Hang Your Hat on My Christmas Tree"
- 2021 Alx Luke - "Neon Lights"
- 2021 Tobey Kai - "Aftermath"
- 2021 LP - "One Last Time"
- 2022 Jessie James Decker - "Break My Heart"
- 2022 Noa Kirel - "Thought About That"
- 2022 Loud As Funk - "Friyay"
- 2022 Jeff Timmons featuring Pompey - "Lit"
- 2022 Lynda Carter - "Human And Divine"
- 2022 Nakia - "Unstoppable"
- 2022 Wyn Starks - "Who I Am"
- 2022 LeAnn Rimes - "spaceship"
- 2022 Pat Premier - "I just want (dance, dance, dance)"
- 2023 Idina Menzel - "Love Power"
- 2023 Lisa + Dawn - "Invincible"
- 2023 Shania Twain - "Giddy Up!"
- 2023 Greg Gould - "Marching On"
- 2023 Supreme Beings of Leisure - "My Ibiza"
- 2023 Shab - "Indestructible"
- 2023 Debbie Gibson - "Love Don't Care"
- 2023 Madeline Consoer - "Heaven"
- 2023 Lisa + Dawn - "It's Christmas Time"
- 2023 Sarah Reeves - "Get Back Your Fight"
- 2023 Tenille Arts & LeAnn Rimes - "Jealous of Myself"
- 2023 Nicole Markson - "Set The World On Fire"
- 2023 Lisa + Dawn - "I Am In Love With You"
- 2023 Pat Premier - "Hands Up"
- 2023 Kimberley Locke - "I Can't Make You Love Me"
- 2023 Chadwick Johnson - "Heart Crisis"
- 2023 LUX featuring Nick Lachey - "Recover"
- 2023 Chappell Roan - "Super Graphic Ultra Modern Girl"
- 2023 Lisa + Dawn - "Ooh It's Christmas"
- 2024 Willie Jones & Ben Burgess - "Dive Bar"
- 2024 Heidi Montag - "Touch Me"
- 2024 Brooke Eden - "Outlaw Love"
- 2024 Heidi Montag - "Body Language"
- 2024 Pat Premier - "Progressive Heart"
- 2024 Beyoncé - "Texas Hold 'Em"
- 2024 Mylène Farmer - "Du temps"
- 2024 Chiara Nova - "Bitter Heart"
- 2024 Alexander James - "Electric"
- 2024 Bright Light Bright Light & Mykal Kilgore - "Heartslap"
- 2024 Paul Hetherington - "Dirty Mind"
- 2024 Katrina Woolverton X Val Garay - "Bette Davis Eyes"
- 2024 Camila Cabello feat. Lil Nas X - "He Knows"
- 2024 Wyn Starks - "Run"
- 2024 Reba McEntire - "I Can't"
- 2024 Summer Bennett - "Just A Phase"
- 2024 Lenny Kravitz - "Human"
- 2024 Tommy Richman - "MILLION DOLLAR BABY"
- 2024 Charli Lark - "Walking On A Dream"
- 2024 Bronski Beat - "Smalltown Boy" (with Tall Paul)
- 2024 Preston Wayne & The Audibles - "F Me Better"
- 2024 Heidi Montag - "I'll Do It"
- 2024 Kristen Anderson-Lopez & Robert Lopez - "Agatha All Along"
- 2024 Adam Mac - "Dust Off Your Boots"
- 2024 Ana Sky - "Sleeping Without You"
- 2024 MkX - "Want U Bad"
- 2024 Essential Logic - "Alien Boys"
- 2024 Heidi Montag - "One More Drink"
- 2024 Cody Belew - "Horseshoes & Hand Grenades"
- 2024 Alexandra John - "Taking Off"
- 2025 Melanie Pfirrman - "Okay"
- 2025 Lady Gaga - "Abracadabra"
- 2025 Andy Bell - "Breaking Thru The Interstellar"
- 2025 Andy Bell - "Don't Cha Know"
- 2025 Greg Gould with Tarryn Stokes - "Come Home"
- 2025 Real Life - "Catch Me I'm Falling"
- 2025 Wyn Starks - "I Drove All Night"
- 2025 Shab - "Dirty"
- 2025 Melanie Pfirrman - "I Don't Wanna Love"
- 2025 Danae Hays - "Dick In My Nightstand"
- 2025 Dave Aude, Andy Bell, Crystal Waters, Sarah Potenza, Wyn Starks, Plumb, Zee Machine and Greg Gould - "Pride (In the Name of Love)"
- 2025 The Osmonds - "Crazy Horses"
- 2025 The Osmonds - "Love Me for a Reason"
- 2025 Shab - "Euphoric"
- 2025 Sarah Reeves - "Cloud Nine"
- 2025 Wyn Starks - "Dance All Night"
- 2025 Shab - "Say It With Your Chest"
- 2025 Tony & The Kiki - "Keep Shinin' On"
- 2025 Sixpence None the Richer - "There She Goes"
- 2025 Dirty Heads - "Oxygen"
- 2025 Taco - "Puttin' On The Ritz"
- 2025 Shontelle Sparkles - "Butterfly Effect"
- 2025 LeAnn Rimes - "Rockin' Around The Christmas Tree"
- 2025 Son Of Rocky - "Do U Still Love Me?"
- 2025 Nikkole - "Connect"
- 2025 Bleona - "Ride It"
- 2025 Andy Bell - "Heart's A Liar" (with Debbie Harry)
- 2026 Shyra Sanchez - "Operator"
- 2026 Orianthi - "Ghost"
- 2026 Melanie Pfirrman - "Feet Are For Dancing"
- 2026 Andreas Moss - "Messed Up"
- 2026 Book Of Love - "Boy"
- 2026 ĠUŻEPPI - "HERE WE GO!"
- 2026 Ty Herndon + Michael Passons featuring Melissa Greene - "Testify To Love"
- 2026 Morgxn - "Make It Out Alive"
- 2026 Courtney Elle - "Freedom"
- 2026 Lisa & Dawn featuring Greg Gould - "Love Is The Answer"
- 2026 Saint Micah - "The Grind"
- 2026 Sammy Davis Jr. with The Mike Curb Congregation - "That Old Black Magic"
- 2026 Clay Aiken - "Rewind"
- 2026 Lucinda Odette - "GOMD"
- 2026 Nyne featuring KC And The Sunshine Band - "Love Goes Up and Down"
- 2026 Wyn Starks - "Coco"
- 2026 Pat Premier & Colin Boyd - "Temptation"
- 2026 DROP TROU featuring Shab - "DROP TROU"
- 2026 Jones Monroe featuring Nomi Imon - "LA DA DI"
- 2026 Jessica Sutta - "Don't Take Much"
- 2026 Shab featuring Jessica Sutta - "Best Of All Time"
- 2026 Fred Schneider & The Superions - "Fruitcake" (with Lisa & Dawn)
- 2026 Frank Bruno - "Under December Lights"
- 2026 Masha Kova - "Red Light Green Light"

== Production credits ==
- 2004 "Devuelveme Los Años" Gerardo
- 2007 "White Lies" Paul Van Dyk featuring Jessica Sutta (Vocal Producer)
- 2012 "Fiyacraka" (Writer and Producer) KORR-A
- 2013 "The Girl Can't Help It" Katia Nicole (Writer and Producer)
- 2013 "All Night" (Writer and Producer) Irina
- 2014 "Love Come Down" (Writer and Producer) Ivan Gomez and Nacho Chapado featuring Vassy
- 2014 "Tomorrow Never Dies" (Producer) Gali
- 2014 "Believe" (Producer) Irina
- 2016 "Used to Love You" Smok3 Machin3s (Producer)
- 2017 "Willing to Beg" J Sutta (Producer)
- 2020 "Gonna Get It All" Nicole Markson (Producer)
- 2021 "Don't Count Me Out" Nicole Markson (Producer)
- 2021 "All Of My Life" Nicole Markson (Producer)
- 2021 "Only Us" Clayton Anderson (Writer and Producer)
- 2021 "Somewhere to Fall" Matt Goss (Writer and Producer)
- 2022 "Show Me Your Fish" Clayton Anderson (Writer and Producer)
- 2022 "Love Comes Once In Your Life" OMG Collective featuring Janice Robinson (Producer)
- 2022 "Believer" Nicole Markson (Producer)
- 2022 "Sun Meets the Water" Samantha Mera (Producer)
- 2022 "Indiana" Clayton Anderson (Writer and Producer)
- 2022 "Never Too Late" Nicole Markson (Producer)
- 2023 "Only One" RoadHouse featuring DYSON (Producer)
- 2023 "Gotta Get Up" Clayton Anderson (Producer)
- 2023 "Invincible" Lisa Dawn (Producer)
- 2023 "Room Service" Alexis Taylor (Writer and Producer)
- 2023 "Set The World On Fire" Nicole Markson (Producer)
- 2023 "Keep on (Falling In Love)" Kimberley Locke & Andres Moss (Producer)
- 2023 "Recover" LUX featuring Nick Lachey (Producer)
- 2023 "Fight For It All" Nicole Markson (Writer and Producer)
- 2023 "Kiss You in the Dark" ECXSS & Steele Fountain (Writer & Producer)
- 2023 "Kissing My Friends" Halston Dare (Producer)
- 2023 "XMAS Kiss" Nicole Markson (Producer)
- 2024 "Congratulations on Your Breakup" Halston Dare (Producer)
- 2024 "Change" Nicole Markson (Producer)
- 2024 "Let Goin'" Nicole Markson (Producer)
- 2024 "Simple Like Rain" Nicole Markson (Producer)
- 2024 "Finalé" Nicole Markson (Producer)
- 2024 "Dynamite" Nicole Markson (Producer)
- 2024 "Strangers" Halston Dare & Conkarah (Producer)
- 2024 Halston Dare - it's not me, it's you (EP)
- 2024 LUX - Phoenix Rising (EP)
- 2024 "Sugar Honey Lover" Nicole Markson (Producer)
- 2024 "Phoenix" Chloe Lattanzi (Writer and Producer)
- 2024 "Stand Up" Nicole Markson (Producer)
- 2025 Andy Bell - Ten Crowns (Album)
- 2025 "Connect" Nikkole (Producer)
- 2025 "Enough Is Enough" Nicole Markson & Sarah Potenza (Producer)
- 2025 "Xanadu" Andy Bell (Producer)
- 2025 "The Chance Won't Come Again" Andy Bell & Tim Rice-Oxley (Producer)
- 2025 "Fabulous Holiday" James Holiday & Sarah Potenza (Producer)
- 2026 "Rewind" Clay Aiken
- 2026 "Move Your Body" Nicole Markson
- 2026 "Don't Take Much" Jessica Sutta
- 2026 "Louder" Sarah Potenza
- 2026 "That's The Way Love Goes" Jessica Sutta
