= Electropop (disambiguation) =

Electropop is a musical genre which is a combination of electronic music and pop music.

Electropop may also refer to:

- Electropop (album), a 2007 album by Jupiter Rising
- "Electropop" (Jupiter Rising song), a 2007 single from Jupiter Rising's Electropop album
- "Elektropop" (Oleg song), a single from Oleg, a contestant on Swedish Idol 2011 (Sweden)
