= The Quiet Hype =

Studio album by Jupiter Rising
- Released: March 17, 2009
- Recorded: 2007–08
- Genre: Pop, electropop, electronic dance, hip hop
- Length: 42:07
- Label: Chime
- Producer: Jupiter Rising, Greg Ogan

Jupiter Rising chronology
Electropop (2007)	The Quiet Hype (2009)

Singles from The Quiet Hype
- 1. "L.A. Girls" / "Très Cool" Released: December 18, 2008; 2. "Falling Away" Released: February 10, 2009

The Quiet Hype is the electropop duo Jupiter Rising's third studio album and was released on March 17, 2009, and is what they call their beat heavy dance album by Seventeen magazine.

== Background ==
The album features an eclectic mix of electro/dance pop, soulful ballads and even the occasional stab at social commentary. The influences vary from pop, rock and hip-hop to dance, electropop, and techno dressed in heavy drums, synths, and guitars. This album differs slightly from their earlier albums, Electropop and Jupiter Rising musically using more spacy synths and live instruments featured on songs like Falling Away, L.A. Girls, and Tres Cool. The inspiration behind album for Spencer "was everything that I wanted to get out and do . Even before it was my project there used to be like six people in this band, and prior to that we all had an idea of where we wanted to go and that somewhere got lost in between pre-production and actually making the record. What we ended up with wasn’t necessarily what I wanted to create but I happened to be the one to own up to it." The sound of this new album is rooted in programmed-electro, but using live instruments on it. "It's live and raw", the band says, "but also a little futuristic with synthesizers. We've been tracking live drums on almost every song and tracking guitars on almost every song, and playing piano and keyboards, but also doing programs with synthesizers and soft synths, and tricks with vocodors and vocals." “We’re making a fresh and electric album with lots of great tracks like “Fallin’ Away,” “Tres Cool” and a shout out to our home LA with ‘LA Girl,’ explains Payo. Guest musicians on new album include: Brent Paschke (guitar); Mike Shapiro (Drums) and Mike Garcon (Keyboards).

== Track listing ==
No.	Title	Writer(s)	Length
1.	"Falling Away"	Jupiter Rising, Greg Ogan	3:58
2.	"Très Cool"	Jupiter Rising, Greg Ogan	3:34
3.	"Guarded"	Jupiter Rising, Greg Ogan, Ruslan Sirota	3:49
4.	"Flip My Switch"	Jupiter Rising	3:35
5.	"The Quiet Hype"	Jupiter Rising, Greg Ogan	4:41
6.	"Over Again"	Jupiter Rising	3:31
7.	"Follow Me"	Jupiter Rising, Ash Riser	4:42
8.	"Quicksand"	Jupiter Rising,	3:52
9.	"L.A. Girls"	Jupiter Rising, Greg Ogan	3:26
10.	"Snakeskin"	Jupiter Rising, Greg Ogan	3:38
11.	"When The Bass Drops"	Jupiter Rising, Greg Ogan, Tigra	3:16
Total length:			42:02

== Promotion ==
The album had been promoted by the Tres Cool E.P. and the single "Falling Away" released February 10. The group confirmed tracks, release date, and cover art on their website and MySpace page. Some songs from the album have been played on MTV's The Hills and other shows on MTV. They have also released some songs to the Internet. L.A. Girls/Tres Cool was released everywhere to digital music stores on December 16, 2008.

== Credits ==
- Robbie Angelucci – Guitar
- Jorge Costa – Engineer
- Mike Garson – Piano
- Peter Mokran – Mixing
- Spencer Nezey – Arranger, Producer, Instrumentation
- Greg Ogan – Arranger, Vocals (background), Producer, Engineer, Mixing, Instrumentation
- Brent Paschke – Guitar
- Brian Porizek – Art Direction, Design
- Mike Shapiro – Drums
- Ruslan Sirota – Keyboards
- Marc Tanner – Executive Producer
- Doug Tyo – Engineer, Assistant Engineer
- Eric Weaver – Mixing Assistant
