= Falling Away =

Falling Away may refer to:

- Backsliding, in Christianity
- Falling Away (album), a 2006 album from Crossfade and the title track
- "Falling Away" (Jupiter Rising song)
- "Falling Away" (Marion Raven song)
