= Tim Madden =

- Also known as: Tim Maxx
- Born: Australia
- Genre: EDM
- Occupations: Director, musician, music producer
- Instrument: Keyboard
- Years active: 2012 – present

Tim Madden, also known professionally as Tim Maxx, is an Australian director, EDM musician, and Music Producer. He is best known for his 2015 single Crash and Burn.

== Career ==
Madden has directed music videos for Afrojack, Erick Morillo, Vassy, Kryder, Bella Hunter, Robbie Rivera, Jyra, Rumors, Black Summer, JVMIE, Keeda, Cedella Marley, Savi, and Manu Crooks. His music videos have been featured in the Top 10 music videos on YouTube in Australia.

=== Collaborations and solo career ===
In 2015, Madden released his debut single Crash and Burn (Armada Music). The track was played over 380,000 times on Spotify. He also collaborated with fellow Australian electronic musician Jamie Lee Wilson on the track Sticks & Stones.

In 2016, he collaborated with Adam Katz on the track Only You. His music video for Mama Said by Jyra feat. Aye Sones was ranked in the Top 5 Hottest Dance Videos of the Week by Shazam.

In 2017, Madden directed the music video for Young Like Me by Black Summer feat. Lowell (produced by Grammy Award-winner Chris 'Tek' O'Ryan) which launched on national television in Australia on Nine Network. He also created a remix of the Grammy Award-winning Dave Audé & JVMIE track Back 2 Love which ranked No. 3 on the Billboard Dance Club Charts.

=== Use in media ===
Madden's tracks have been featured on network television shows Law & Order, The Voice, The Tonight Show, The X Factor Australia, and Australia's Next Top Model, and in commercials for American Express, Reebok, and Chevy. He has also created brand content for Sydney Festival, Sydney Opera House, Mission Australia, and Bondi Icebergs.

== Discography ==
Year	Title	Label	Other Artist(s)
2014	You Gotta Have Love	Studio Two Twelve	
2014	Into The Sun	Studio Two Twelve	Young Men Society
2014	Beast Mode	Independent	Manu Crooks
2015	Crash and Burn	Armada Music B.V.	
2015	Sticks & Stones	Studio Two Twelve	Jamie Lee Wilson
2016	By My Side	Studio Two Twelve	Mike Rossi
2016	Broken	Studio Two Twelve	
2016	Only You	Studio Two Twelve	Adam Katz
2016	Touch The Sky	Independent	Lauren Ojurovic

== Filmography ==
Year	Title	Role	Notes
2012	Tim Maxx & Keeda: Rock With You	Director, editor, Grader	Music Video
2013	Keeda: Control	Director, editor, Grader	Music Video
2014	Rhiannon Villareal: Heartbeat	Director, editor	Music Video
2014	Tim Maxx: You Gotta Have Love	Director, editor, Visual FX	Music Video
2014	Tim Maxx feat. Young Men Society: Into The Sun	Director, editor, Visual FX	Music Video
2015	Tim Maxx & Jamie Lee Wilson: Sticks & Stones	Director, producer, editor, Grader	Music Video
2015	Tim Maxx: Crash and Burn	Director, producer, editor, Visual FX	Music Video
2016	Tim Maxx feat. Adam Katz: Only You	Director, producer, editor, Grader	Music Video
2016	GFDM & MD Electro feat. Neonheart: Right On Time	Director, producer, editor, Grader	Music Video
2016	Tim Maxx feat. Mike Rossi: By My Side	Director, producer, editor, Grader	Music Video
2016	Jyra feat. Kye Sones: Mama Said	Director, producer, editor, Grader	Music Video
2016	Tim Maxx: Broken	Director, producer, editor, Grader	Music Video
2017	Black Summer feat. Lowell: Young Like Me	Director	Music Video
2017	Collar	Music Score	Short Film
2017	Rumors: Look Out Below	Director	Music Video
2017	Cedella Marley feat. Savi and Bankay: Could You Be Loved	Director	Music Video
2017	Afrojack and Vassy feat. Oliver Rosa: Lost	Director	Music Video
2017	Kryder and Erick Morillo feat. Bella Hunter: Waves	Director	Music Video

== Awards and nominations ==
In 2016, Madden was awarded 2nd Place for Electronic dance music in the International Songwriting Competition along with Adam Katz.

In 2017, he was a finalist in the Elton John: The Cut competition held by YouTuber Kurt Schneider to direct Elton John's Tiny Dancer. He also scored the short film Collar (directed by Rowan Maher), which won Best Drama at the Hollywood Boulevard Film Festival 2017.
