= Jamie Lee Wilson =

Australian singer/songwriter

- Also known as: JVMIE
- Born: Australia
- Genres: Electronic music, dance music, house music, EDM
- Occupations: Singer, songwriter, music producer
- Labels: Universal Music, Warner Music, Spinnin' Records, Black Hole Records, Kontor Records, Tiger Records, Nervous Records, Ministry of Sound, Hotfingers, Audacious Records, C2 Records, Vamos Records
- Website: http://www.iamjvmie.com

Jamie Lee Wilson, also known as JVMIE, is an Australian singer, songwriter and music producer. She is best known for the 2017 single Back 2 Love in collaboration with Dave Audé, which peaked at No. 2 on the Billboard Club Dance Chart and No. 31 on the Billboard Hot Dance Electronic Songs Chart.

== Early life and education ==
Wilson was born and raised on the Gold Coast, Queensland in Australia. She earned a Bachelor of Music at the Queensland Conservatorium of Music with a major in Jazz Voice, and was featured by Triple J Unearthed in Australia.

== Career ==
After completing a Bachelor of Music at the Queensland Conservatorium of Music, Wilson relocated to London to continue her studies and went on to perform across the United Kingdom and Europe. She worked in musical theatre. Simultaneously, Wilson began her career writing and recording music.

Wilson went on to write and record multiple dance singles, and in 2016, she relocated to Los Angeles.

=== Collaborations and solo records ===
In 2016, Wilson collaborated with Dave Audé on the single Back 2 Love which peaked at No. 2 on the Billboard Club Dance Chart and No. 31 on the Billboard Hot Dance Electronic Songs Chart. During the same year, Wilson was ranked No. 1 on the Los Angeles Dance Chart on ReverbNation.

She has collaborated with songwriter and producer Tommy Faragher, house musician Todd Terry, electronic music producers Sultan & Ned Shepard, DJ Joachim Garraud, producer and DJ Stonebridge, musician Dave Audé, and American vocalist Chris Willis.

Her singles have consistently ranked on dance and club charts nationally and internationally. These include Out of Nowhere, a collaboration with StoneBridge, which ranked in the top 30 most played songs on US dance radio in 2015, Your Love with Kid Kenobi and Justin Hunter which ranked No. 3 on the ARIA Club Charts for six consecutive weeks, ranked No. 2 on the Kiss FM Charts, and was played on Rage and Channel V; Get What You Give with Alex Kenji and Manuel De La Mare (Spinnin' Records) which ranked No. 17 on the Progressive house chart on Beatport; Promise Me which ranked No. 1 on Track It Down for over four weeks and in the Top 10 on Beatport; Like A Flame which was released in July 2015 with Todd Terry and was featured on in House Sessions in Ibiza; Teardrop with Sydney Blu which ranked No. 13 on DMC World Magazine's Buzz Chart, ranked in Top 40 on ITunes Dance Charts, and was featured on the album Relentless which ranked in the top 20 on Beatport and in the top 40 on the ITunes Dance Charts; I Need A Miracle which ranked No. 4 on Juno Downloads; Can You Feel Me (Universal Music) which ranked No. 5 on the Australian radio charts and was featured on Pump It: Volume 4 compilation which ranked No. 3 on the ARIA Charts; I Think I'm in Love in collaboration with the Futuristic Polar Bears (Universal Music); Champagne Nights with the Stafford Brothers which was released on Ministry of Sound; Would Not Change a Thing with Soul Conspiracy which ranked No. 1 on Radio Metro; Black Rain, written with American house producer Ron Carroll, for which Wilson produced the Naked Remix which then debuted on Cr2 Records; Stop The World with Ralph Good (Warner Music and Kontor Records) which ranked No. 3 on the EDM charts in Canada, ranked on Beatport's Top 100 House charts, and featured on the Berlin Fashion Week official compilation, and the Kontor House of House compilation; Where You Are which was released on Japan's Sushi Records and ranked No. 3 on the Beatport Charts; and I'll Give You The World with Quix which ranked No. 21 in Spotify's New Music Friday Cratediggers playlist and was featured on Apple Music Germany Dance: The A-List, Apple Music Germany Dance: Hot Tracks, iTunes Canada Dance: The A-List, Beatport Trap/Future Bass: Staff Picks, and Aoki's House Radio Show on Sirius XM BPM.

Wilson released her first solo record Crazy Beautiful in 2015. She also hosted and produced her own radio show Just Wanna Dance during prime time on Saturday evenings in Australia, in addition to hosting fashion, music and television events.

In 2018, Wilson released the track Chasing, in collaboration with Shaun Warner, which ranked No. 32 on the Billboard Club Dance Chart.

=== Live performances and festivals ===
Wilson has performed live at international music festivals, including Creamfields and Summerfieldayze. She has performed on the world's largest floating music festival The Groove Cruise in 2016 (San Diego / Cabo San Lucas) and (Miami / Jamaica) and 2015 (Los Angeles / Catalina Island), on the main stage at California's Sundown Music Festival on Huntington Beach.

She has supported Kelly Rowland, Salt-N-Pepa, Kaskade, and James Morrison, and performed at Pacha Ibiza supporting David Guetta, in Amsterdam supporting CeCe Peniston, in Japan supporting Steve Aoki, at Brixton Academy in London supporting Carl Cox, and at various venues in London supporting The Freemasons, Junior Jack, and The Shapeshifters. She has also performed at renowned Los Angeles clubs Sound and Avalon, as well as distinguished London venues Pacha and Turnmills.

She has performed live on Good Morning Australia, live on radio in Europe, New Zealand and Australia, and performed live multiple times in the United States, Russia, Switzerland, and Amsterdam, performed for Ministry of Sound Japan, Hed Kandi in New Zealand, and at venues in France, Singapore, and across her native country Australia, including performances for the Australian Prime Minister in Brisbane, Australia and the Russian Prime Minister in Sochi, Russia.

=== Use in media ===
In 2011, Wilson co-wrote and recorded the new anthem Everybody (Hala Madrid) with the Stafford Brothers for the Real Madrid Football Club.

In 2017, her track Your Love with Kid Kenobi and Justin Hunter was featured on the Logie Award-winning Australian drama series Packed to the Rafters. Additional tracks were featured on international television channel FashionTV.

== Discography ==
Year	Title	Label	Other Artist(s)	Notes
2008	Bring It Down EP	Morrison Recordings	Roast Groove	
2008	Move on Up	Open Bar Music	Ospina Oscar P	
2008	I Just Wanna Dance	Kinky Malinki	Double Track	
2009	Fake	Jacksquad Records	Tom De Neef Baggi Begovic	
2009	Fake Part 2	Jacksquad Records	Tom De Neef Baggi Begovic	
2009	Alright Tonight	Soulisimo Records	Silvano Da Silva	
2011	Can You Feel Me	Universal Music Xelon Entertainment	Gemstar	Ranked No. 5 on the Australian radio charts Featured on Pump It: Volume 4 compilation which ranked No. 3 on the ARIA Charts
2011	I Think I'm in Love	Universal Music Weekend Millionaires	Futuristic Polar Bears Joe Quinn	
2011	Champagne Nights	Hussle Recordings	Stafford Brothers	
2011	Would Not Change A Thing	Pool E / Radikal	Soul Conspiracy	Ranked No. 1 on Radio Metro DJ Charts
2011	Drop The Bomb	Vicious Recordings	Thomas J	
2011	Because of You	Dance and Love	Casey Barnes	Writer
2011	Everybody (Hala Madrid)	ZOVA Sports Music International	Stafford Brothers	
2012	Automatic	Nervous Records	Baggi Begovic Robbie Taylor	
2012	Black Rain	Cr2 Records	Ron Carroll	
2012	Stop The World	Warner Music Kontor Records	Ralph Good	Ranked No. 3 on EDM charts in Canada Ranked in Top 100 on Beatport House Charts
2012	Fuel to the Fire	Juicy Music	Jesse Voorn	
2013	Where You Are	Sushi Records	Aurtas Erich Logan Ko-matsushima	Ranked No. 3 on the Beatport Charts
2013	We'll Stay Young	In Charge	Yonathan Zvi Thierry Ganz	
2013	Your Love	Klub Kids	Kid Kenobi Justin Hunter	Ranked No. 2 on the Kiss FM Charts Ranked No. 3 on the ARIA Charts Featured on Australian drama series Packed to the Rafters
2013	Get What You Give	Spinnin' Records	Alex Kenji Manuel De La Mare	Ranked No. 17 on the Progressive house Chart on Beatport
2014	Glow in the Dark	Tiger Records	David Jones Glassesboys	
2014	Body & Soul	Vamos Music	R.O.N.N.	
2014	Promise Me	418 Music		Ranked No. 1 on Track It Down Charts Ranked in Top 10 on Beatport Charts
2014	We Ran The Night	HotFingers	Alex Kenji	
2015	Like A Flame	In House Records	Todd Terry	
2015	Teardrop	Blue Music Black Hole Recordings	Sydney Blu	Ranked No. 13 on DMC World Magazine's Buzz Chart Ranked in Top 40 on ITunes Dance Charts Featured on the album Relentless which ranked in Top 20 on Beatport Charts
2015	I Need A Miracle	Club Luxury Records	Petch Kings (5)	Ranked No. 4 on Juno Downloads
2015	Sticks & Stones	Studio Two Twelve	Tim Maxx	
2015	Out of Nowhere	Stoney Boy Music	Stonebridge	Ranked in Top 30 Most Played Songs on US Dance Radio in 2015
2015	Crazy Beautiful EP	Fine-Tune Records		
2016				
2016	Midnight Calling	No Definition	Giacca & Flores	
2016	Hanging By a Thread	Attic Records		
2016	Back 2 Love	Audacious Records	Dave Audé	Ranked No. 2 on the Billboard Club Dance Chart Ranked No. 31 on the Billboard Hot Dance Electronic Songs Chart
2016	Stronger on My Own	Vamos Music	Gerald Henderson Rio Dela Duna	
2017	The Right Love EP	Vamos Music	Water Juice	
2017	All I Want Is You	Vamos Music	Water Juice	
2017	Follow You	Attic Records		
2018	Chasing	Universal Music Mena	Shaun Warner	Ranked No. 32 on the Billboard Club Dance Chart
2018	Timeless	Garuda Music	Darude	

== Awards and nominations ==
In 2013, Wilson was nominated along with the Gowrie Boys for Film Clip of the Year at the National Indigenous Music Awards for Tomorrow's Heroes, and was a finalist in the International Songwriting Competition and the Queensland Music Awards.

In 2015, she was nominated for both Artist of the Year and the People's Choice Awards in the Gold Coast Music Awards.

In 2016, she was nominated along with the Gowrie Boys in the Queensland Music Awards for Won't Let You Go.

In 2020, JVMIE was awarded a mini grant from HOTA Rage Against The Virus Fund to create an album in isolation with film composer, Lionel Cohen while affected by the COVID-19 pandemic
