= Northalsted Market Days =

Festival in Chicago, Illinois, U.S.

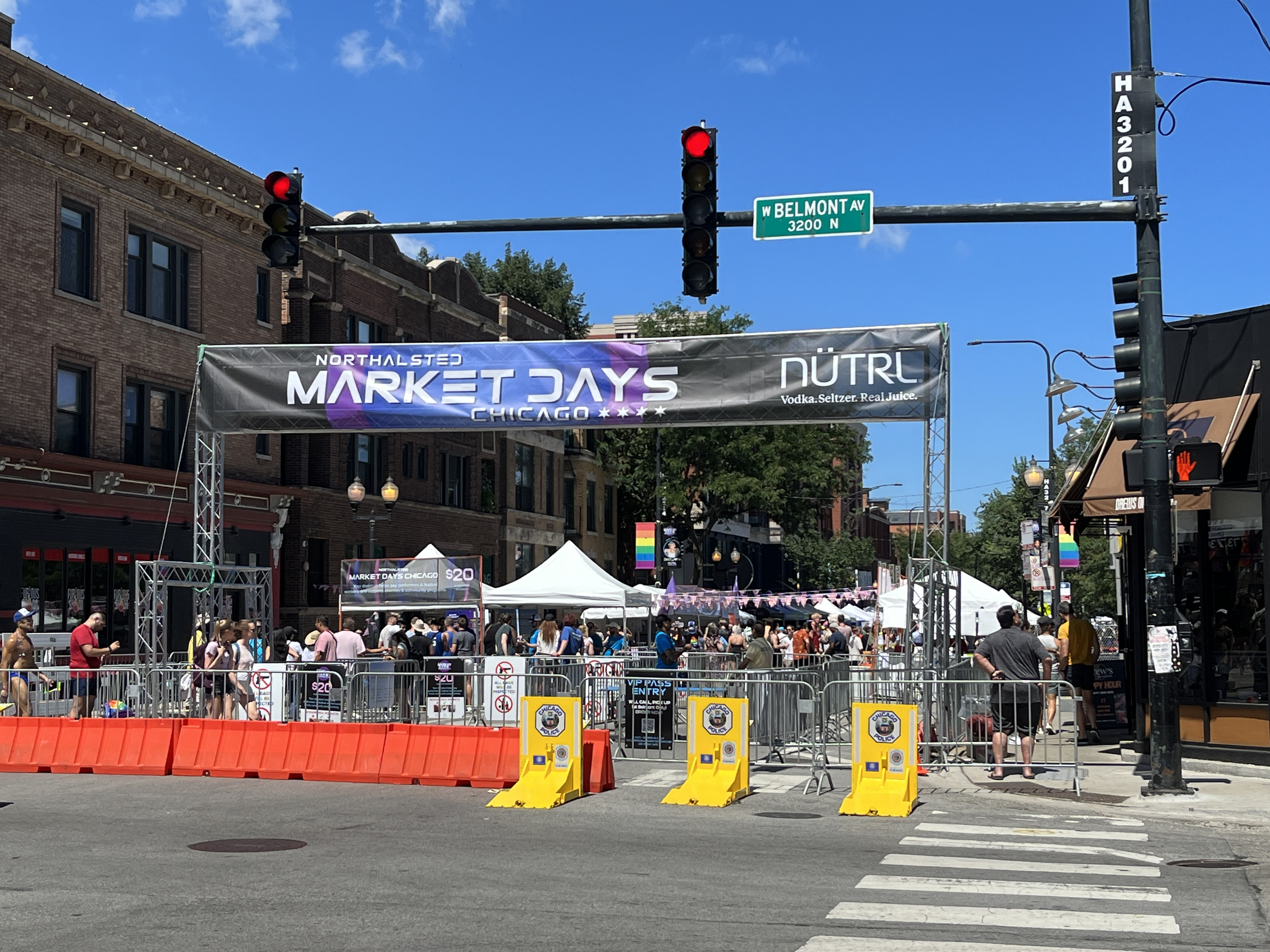
- Street fair entrance, 2023
- Location: Chicago, Illinois
- Country: United States
- Inaugurated: 1982

Northalsted Market Days is an annual two-day festival in Chicago, Illinois, United States. Established in 1982, it's the Midwest's largest street festival with annual attendance exceeding 300,000 people over the two-day event.

== Description ==
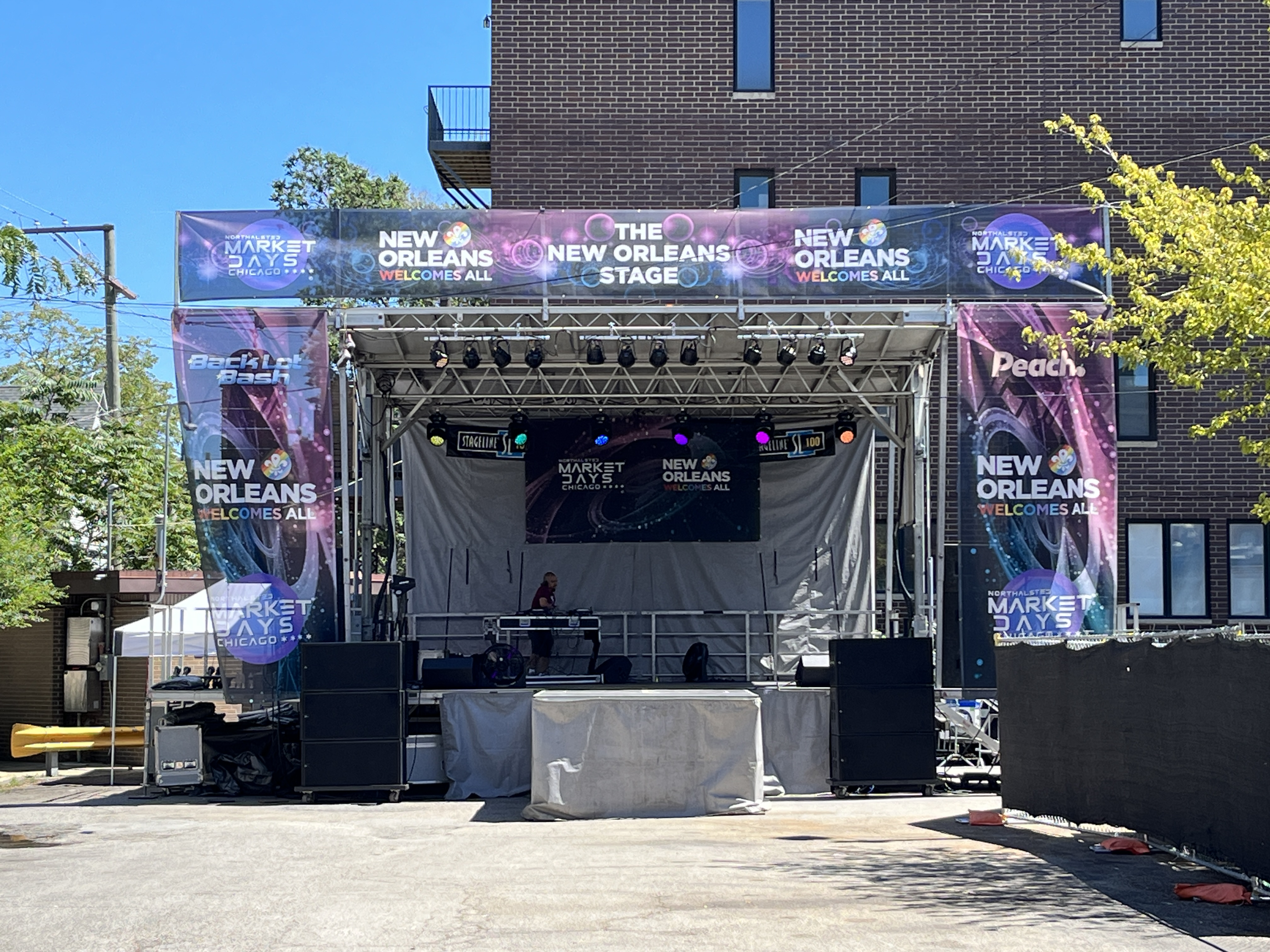
Stage at the festival, 2023

The festival takes place in the Boystown section of Lakeview along North Halsted Street from Belmont Avenue to Addison Avenue and is a half-mile long. The festival consists of 3 music stages, 2 local band stages and a dance floor. The festival showcases food and merchandise tents. There are also Halsted business establishment tents, as well as those of radio stations, public service organizations & companies (SAAB in 2008). Many give away small souvenir items.

The overall flavor of the event is decidedly geared toward the LGBT community, but is open to all. The street remains closed from Saturday at 7am to Monday at 1am. Most of the businesses along Halsted Street are open during the day and stay open late each night when the festival ends for the day. Most notably the 20+ bars and restaurants see a significant increase in patronage.

== History ==
2006 was the 25th Anniversary for North Halsted Market Days, and helping celebrate were such performers as Billie Myers, Brazilian Girls, Powder, East Village Opera Company and Michael McDermott.

2008 performers included '80s pop group Exposé and Broadway singer Jennifer Holliday. In 2011, singers Darren Criss and Gloria Gaynor performed at the festival. In 2012, Olivia Newton-John, Sheena Easton, and the Pointer Sisters performed. In 2015, headliners included Salt-N-Pepa, En Vogue and Aaron Carter, among other notable performers.

There was no Market Days in 2020 due to the COVID-19 pandemic.

== Notable performers ==
- 10,000 Maniacs
- A Flock of Seagulls
- Aaron Carter
- Adam Barta
- Alex Newell
- Alexis Jordan
- All-4-One
- Alyssa Edwards
- Andy Bell
- Betty Who
- Belinda Carlisle
- Berlin
- Big Freedia
- Billie Myers
- Billy Porter
- Blake Lewis
- Blu Cantrell
- Blush
- Bonnie McKee
- Brian Justin Crum
- C + C Music Factory
- CeCe Peniston
- Charice
- Cherie Currie
- Chi Chi LaRue
- Crystal Waters
- Darren Criss
- David Archuleta
- David Cassidy
- David Hernandez
- Deborah Cox
- Diana King
- En Vogue
- Erika Jayne
- Exposé
- Ferras
- Frenchie Davis
- Gina Glocksen
- Gloria Gaynor
- Icona Pop
- Inaya Day
- Jack & Jack
- Jake Miller
- Jennifer Holliday
- Jessica Sutta
- Jill Sobule
- Joan Jett
- Jody Watley
- Jon Secada
- Judy Tenuta
- Karmin
- Kat Graham
- Keke Palmer
- Kerli
- Kiesza
- Kimberley Locke
- Kristine W
- La Bouche
- Leslie Jordan
- Linda Clifford
- Lisa Lisa
- Lynda Carter
- Manila Luzon
- Margaret Cho
- Martha Wash
- Mary Lambert
- MAX
- Maxine Nightingale
- Mimi Imfurst
- Monet X Change
- Neon Trees
- Nina Flowers
- Olivia Newton-John
- Paris Bennett
- Prince Poppycock
- Pussy Riot
- RJD2
- Robin S.
- Rockell
- Salt-N-Pepa
- Saucy Santana
- Sheena Easton
- Shiny Toy Guns
- Sir the Baptist
- Steve Grand
- Taylor Dayne
- The Cover Girls
- The Pointer Sisters
- Thea Austin
- Tiffany
- Todrick Hall
- Tony Hadley
- Trenyce
- Trixie Mattel
- Ty Herndon
- Ultra Nate
- The Village People
- (We Are) Nexus
- Who Is Fancy
- Wilson Phillips
- Wynter Gordon
