= Falling Away (Jupiter Rising song) =

- Front cover

Single by Jupiter Rising

from the album The Quiet Hype
- Released: February 10, 2009 (radio)
- Genre: Electropop
- Length: 3:58 (album version); 3:36 (radio edit)
- Label: Chime
- Songwriter: Jupiter Rising
- Producer: Jupiter Rising

Jupiter Rising singles chronology
"Electropop" (2007)	"Falling Away" (2009)

Music video
- "Falling Away" on YouTube

"Falling Away" is a song by American pop duo Jupiter Rising, released as a single on February 10, 2009. The song runs through a downtempo dance beat like their 2007 hit single "Electropop".

== Background ==
The song runs through a downtempo dance beat. The instrumentation involved is that of synth-keyboards, guitars, synthesizer, and drum set. The song was written as a criticism of West Coast consumerism.

== Critical response ==
Alexandra Cahill of Billboard comments on the song calling it "an easy-to-like track with tight harmonies, showcases the duo's readiness to conquer the dancefloor." Starpulse says:

The genre-defying electropop of "Falling Away" flaunts Spencer's production talents: dense layers of spacey synths, vintage keyboards and smart rhythms (in other words, headphone fodder). Together, Spencer and Jessie have a playful dynamic with their call-and-response vocals and indelible, harmonized hooks. "Falling Away" functions as a representation of Jupiter Rising as a whole: smart, insanely catchy and undeniably danceable.

== Music video ==
The music video is available on iTunes. The music video for "Falling Away", directed by Andrew Gura, was shot in Los Angeles in November 2008 and released in late January 2009. The group is featured singing in a dark room separated from the other scene of the video, in which a man is dancing through a neighborhood.
