= Oleg Nejlik =

Swedish singer

Oleg Nejlik better known as just Oleg (born 24 August 1984 in Moscow) is a Swedish performer of Russian origin and based in Åkersberga, Sweden, who took part in Idol 2011, the eighth season of the Swedish version of Idol. He sang "Elektropop", his own composition in the audition of the premiere show on 4 September 2011 and the song became an instant success with the Swedish public. The same week, a studio version of the song was released by Universal Music that peaked at number three on Sverigetopplistan, the official Swedish Singles Chart. Nejlik also appeared in a film role in Hundraettåringen, where he was a member of a balalaika band performing in the song "Balla Balla Rocking Balalajka".

== Discography ==
=== Albums ===
- 2011: En liten cola tack

=== Singles ===
Title	Year	Peak positions
Title	Year	SWE
"Elektropop"	2011	3
"Drive"	2019	—
