= L.A. Girls/Tres Cool =

Tres Cool, L.A. Girls EP

EP by Jupiter Rising
- Released: December 16, 2008
- Recorded: 2008
- Genre: Electronic dance, electropop, hip hop
- Length: 6:57
- Label: Chime
- Producer: Jupiter Rising

Jupiter Rising chronology
Electropop (2007)	Tres Cool, L.A. Girls EP (2008)	The Quiet Hype (2009)

Tres Cool, L.A. Girls EP is an EP by electronic dance music group Jupiter Rising. It contains 2 songs by Jupiter Rising from their latest album The Quiet Hype. The songs were debuted on MTV's The Hills on November 17, 2008.It was Released to digital music stores on December 16, 2008.

== Track listing ==
From Amazon.com.

1. "L.A. Girls" Jupiter Rising - 3:24
2. "Tres Cool" Jupiter Rising - 3:33
