= Pearl Future =

American songwriter and vocalist

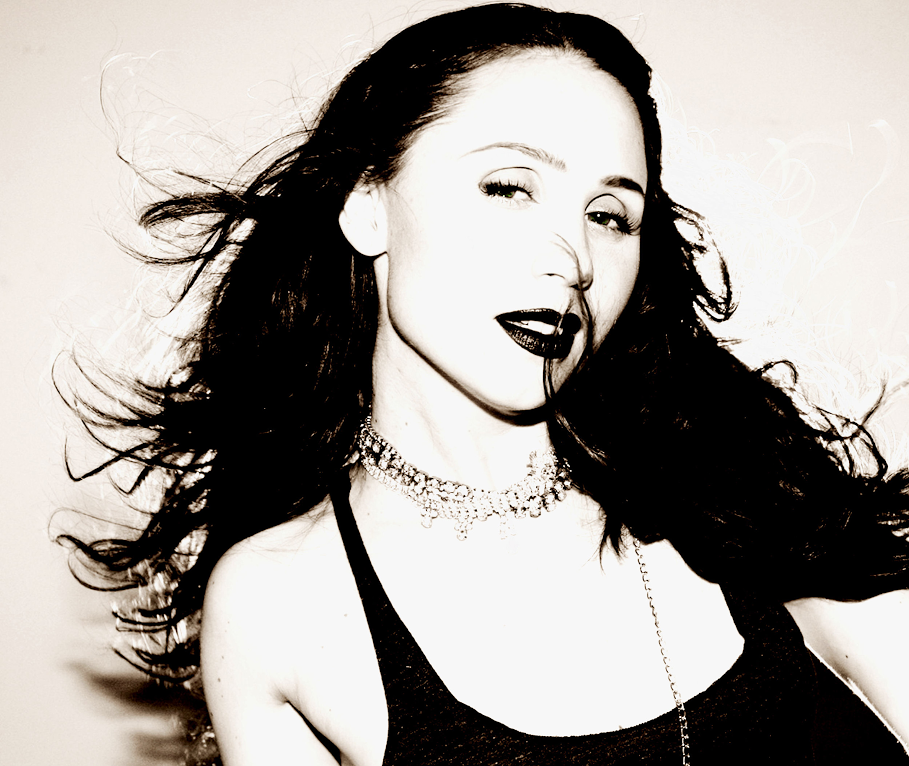

Background information
- Born: Pearl Ross
- Genres: Electronic, pop-rap
- Occupations: Songwriter, vocalist
- Years active: 2002–present

Pearl Future is the stage name of Pearl Ross, a songwriter and vocalist from the Bay Area in California. She is best known for her collaboration with Nicki Minaj on the song "Lookin' at Me, which was a Top 20 hit in 2012 for BBC Radio 1.

== Early life ==
Pearl Future was born in Las Vegas, where she was often allowed backstage to performances at the Circus Circus hotel. She grew up learning to play the piano from her father, who raised her in Sacramento. She recorded her first song by herself at 16, using a Neve console to track and transfer the session.

She adopted the name "Pearl" after her grandmother, and "Future" because she believed in looking forward and staying focused on life and her ambitions.

Pearl Future lost her father (who was a single parent) at the age of 17, at which point she moved to a communal artist warehouse in San Francisco. She was heavily influenced by the underground music scene around her, including the artists, poets, and drag queens who frequented the space.

== Career ==
In 2006, Future's single "Carry Me" was named Single of the Month by Singer Universe, and she released "It's Bad" to college radio stations nationally in 2009. Around that time, she was also working at A&R Worldwide, an indie music company that helped Pearl develop both her skills and stage presence.

In 2012, Future embarked on a summer tour and released two albums: “Play Date”, which includes “Lookin At Me” (a BBC Radio 1 Top 20 in 2012 hit), and the single "I Can't Get Enough of You". Future recorded "Lookin at Me" after sharing the beat with Nicki Minaj, who immediately wrote a verse for the track.

The song was featured in Young Money mixtapes, in addition to its success on music blogs. In 2013, Future released the song "I Can't Get Enough of You" as a collaboration with Sidney Samson which peaked at 37 on the Billboard 200.

In 2014, Pearl formed the Internet music label CHAOSPOP and has used the platform to spread independent music. In 2015, Future began Everwave, an Internet radio station devoted to Independent, electronic music.

Pearl has listed her musical influences as: Bjork, Elvis, Prince, Mariah Carey, Dr. Dre, and Diane Warren, among others.

== Discography ==
- 2010 – "Lookin' At Me" featuring Nicki Minaj
- 2011 – "DJ Slap My Song" featuring Yung Joc
- 2012 – "5150" featuring Bobby Brackins
- 2012 – Girls Mixtape
- 2013 – Play Date EP
- 2013 – I Can't Get Enough of You
