= Starling Glow =

American pop/rock band

- Origin: Orange County, California
- Genres: Pop/Rock, Pop, Rock, Electronica, Dance, Indie
- Years active: 2013–present
- Labels: Trailblaze Music Group
- Website: www.starlingglow.com

Starling Glow is a pop/rock band from Orange County, California fronted by singer/songwriter Liz Hill.

== Background ==
Liz Hill grew up in a musical family and was influenced by a wide range of musical genres. During her college years, Liz listened to more Top 40 radio and found a new appreciation for melody and lyrics. She started to admire artists who were able to crossover between rock and pop genres. This inspired her to blur the lines and cross between alternative rock, pop and dance with her single "We Are Infinite."

"We Are Infinite" originally debuted at #40 on Billboard's Club Chart before peaking at #19. We Are Infinite reached #39 on the Mediabase Top 40 radio chart as of June 21, 2014.

Starling Glow's debut album is set to be released soon and reflects Liz's musical taste by combining rock-and-roll roots with electronic, dance and indie influences. The album was produced by Grammy nominated producer, songwriter and musician Billy Mohler who has worked with artists like Lifehouse, Kelly Clarkson and The Smashing Pumpkins. Starling Glow also worked with drummer Josh Freese who has played with Evanescence and Guns N' Roses, as well as Colbie Caillat, and Matthew Chamberlain who is known for his work with Kanye West, John Mayer and Sara Bareilles.

Starling Glow's musical style has been compared to the likes of Paramore, Ellie Goulding and Foxes.

== "We Are Infinite" Single ==
"We Are Infinite" is the first single off Starling Glow's self-titled debut album. It was the last track that was written for the album and is about seizing the moment and feeling unstoppable and infinite. The music video was directed by Jon Danovic and was filmed at a warehouse in downtown Los Angeles. The video has been well received by fans and currently has over 25,000 views on YouTube. "We Are Infinite' was remixed by Dave Audé who has worked with Coldplay, Katy Perry and Lady Gaga and has had 98 #1 tracks on Billboard's Dance Club charts.

=== Chart Success ===
"We Are Infinite" debuted at #40 on Billboard's Club Chart and rose to #25 before peaking at #19. "We Are Infinite" is currently #39 on the Mediabase Top 40 radio chart.

=== Performances ===
Starling Glow performed "We Are Infinite" for the first time at the Avalon Hollywood nightclub in early February 2014 in front of an enthusiastic crowd. She performed again at the Avalon in May 2014 as part of the Cinco 2 Tour featuring IM5, Diamond White of The X Factor USA and other social media stars. For her first three tour dates, Starling Glow played radio shows for New York's WNOW-FM 92.3NOW, Hartford's WKSS - Kiss 95.7 and New Haven's WKCI-FM KC101.

== Discography ==
Singles
Title	Details
We Are Infinite (Radio Edit)	Released: 2014; Label: Trailblaze Music Group
We Are Infinite (Dave Aude Remix)	Released: 2014; Label: Trailblaze Music Group
