= Electropop (Jupiter Rising song) =

- Front cover

Single by Jupiter Rising

from the album Electropop
- Released: June 12, 2007 (radio)
- Genre: Electropop
- Length: 3:51
- Label: Chime
- Songwriter: Jupiter Rising
- Producer: Jupiter Rising

Jupiter Rising singles chronology
"Go!" (2006)	"Electropop" (2007)	"Falling Away" (2009)

Music video
- "Electropop" on YouTube

Alternative cover
- iTunes EP cover

"Electropop" is a song by American pop duo Jupiter Rising, released as a single from their second studio album, Electropop. It was released to Sirius Satellite radio on June 12, 2007, and for digital download on June 19, 2007. The song charted on the Billboard's Hot Dance Music.

== Background ==
The song runs through a downtempo dance beat. The instrumentation involved is that of synth-keyboards, guitars, synthesizer, and drum set. Electropop has the flirtatious banter of Furtado's "Promiscuous", a ready-made synth club beat, and even gives a slight name drop for 50 Cent's "Candy Shop".

== Music video ==
The music video was directed by Paul "Coy" Allen, and edited by Ryan Stevens. The music video was released on June 23, 2007 to the internet. The music video starts out with the band played the synth-driven song starting with the synth-keyboards. The band is playing in front of a small audience. The video also has scenes of Payo and Nezzey singing in different places, such as in a salon or beside a car.

== Track listing ==
Digital single

1. "Electropop" (main version) — 3:51

Digital EP

1. "Electropop" (Rod Carillo Mix) — 4:15
2. "Electropop" (Rod Carillo Smooth Club Mix) — 7:07
3. "Electropop" (Rod Carillo Funk Yo' Head Dub) — 7:07
4. "Electropop" (Lenny B Radio Mix) — 4:38
5. "Electropop" (Lenny B Club Mix) — 7:23

== Charts ==
Chart (2007)
Charts	Peak Position
Hot Dance Music/ Club Airplay	15
Hot Dance Airplay	17
