= Jupiter Rising (album) =

Studio album by Jupiter Rising
- Released: September 26, 2006
- Recorded: 2006
- Genre: Pop, electronic dance, pop rap
- Length: 40:50
- Label: Chime
- Producer: Marc Tanner

Jupiter Rising chronology
Jupiter Rising (2006)	Electropop (2007)

Singles from Jupiter Rising
- 1. "Go!" Released: June 19, 2006

Professional ratings
Review scores
Source	Rating
About.com	4/5 stars

Jupiter Rising is the début album of electronic dance music group Jupiter Rising. It was released on September 26, 2006. The song featured "Go!", one of the band's more notable tracks.

== Track listing ==
Digital album

1. "Go!" (main version) — 3:27
2. "Wicked" (main version) — 3:46
3. "Liv the Day" (main version) — 3:26
4. "Hero" (main version) — 4:40
5. "The Bus" (main version) — 3:40
6. "Foolish" (main version) — 3:51
7. "Frenz" (main version) — 3:56
8. "Home" (main version) — 3:41
9. "Wish" (main version) — 3:14
10. "They Say" (main version) — 3:13
11. "Backstage" (main version) — 3:45

== Credits ==
- Anabel DeHaven - Make-Up
- Quincy McCrary - Keyboards, Vocals (Background)
- Alan Steinberger - Piano, Keyboards
- Craig Stull - Guitar (Electric), Spanish Guitar
- Cameron Stone - String Quartet
- Mike Shapiro - Bass, Percussion, Drums
- Ron Coro - Creative Director
- Robert Hadley - Mastering
- Samuel Formicola - String Quartet
- Jason Villaroman - Producer, Engineer, Editing
- Ethan Willoughby - Mixing
- Ludvig Girdland - String Quartet
- Eric Victorino - Art Direction, Design
- Devin DeHaven - Photography
- Scott Elgin - Mixing Assistant
- Ian Suddarth - Engineer, Assistant
- Caleb Speir - Bass
- Marc Tanner - Producer
- Bob Glaub - Bass
- Marc Greene - Digital Editing
