= Ryan Skyy =

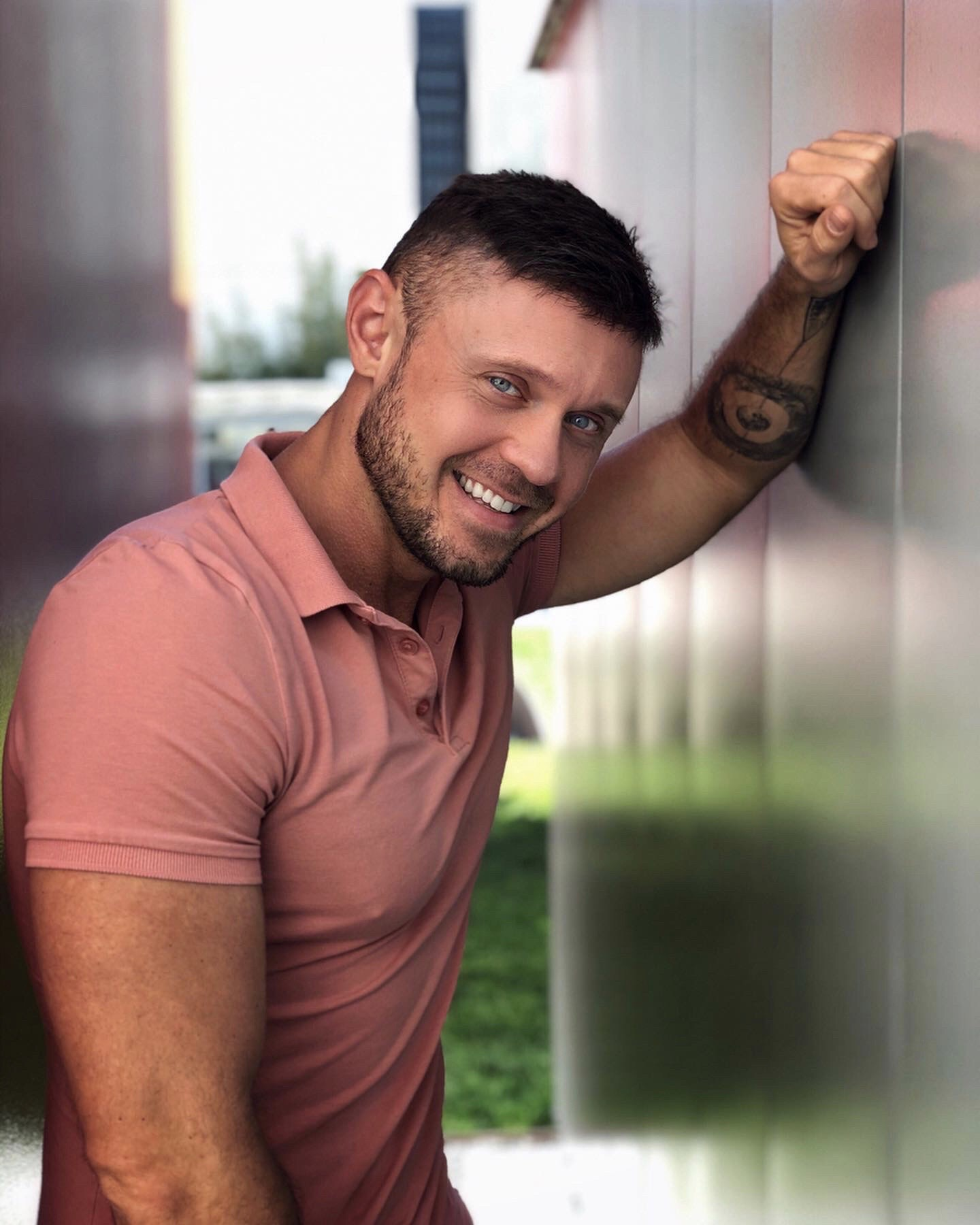
- Ryan Skyy in Los Angeles, CA
- Occupations: Music producer; DJ; songwriter
- Musical career
- Genres: House music
- Instruments: Vocals; keyboards; piano; synthesiser; sampler; sequencer
- Years active: 2015–present
- Labels: Universal Music Group; Republic Records
- Website: www.instagram.com/ryanskyy

Ryan Skyy is an American house music producer, DJ, radio talk show host and songwriter with six No. 1 Billboard-charting remixes, a Top 40 Billboard-charting single, and a #9 iTunes US Top 40 Dance single.

Skyy is the host of the weekly radio talk show 'Life Rhythms' on idobi Radio. The show follows Skyy's personal growth journey through the eyes of his favorite songs. Past guests include Cheat Codes, Tritonal and Kiesza.

Billboard Magazine recognized Skyy's remix of Adele's "Hello" as having helped the "monster smash ... conquer clubs" and reach the No. 1 spot on the Dance Club Songs Chart. Skyy is also a Billboard-reporting DJ for the Dance Club Songs chart as well as a remixer for major artists and labels including Ariana Grande, Janet Jackson and Lady Gaga.

On March 15, 2018 Shangela released the single "Pay Me (feat. Ryan Skyy)", which Skyy co-wrote and produced. Within 24 hours the single reached #9 on the iTunes US Top 40 Dance chart and was charting in 15 other countries, including Australia where it entered the chart at #16.

Skyy's debut single "DONE" peaked at #41 on Billboard's "Dance Club Songs" chart, broke 100,000 views on YouTube, and was named the dance track of the summer by OUT Magazine. Skyy was the subject of an extended interview in the Huffington Post in March 2015 as well as CBS's Mancave Daily in April 2015.

From 2015 to 2017, Skyy produced music for fashion designer Marco Marco's New York Fashion Week and Los Angeles Fashion Week runway shows, which altogether have received over four million views. The success of Skyy's fashion week scores inspired him to release one of the songs, "It Do Take Nerve", as his follow-up single to "DONE". The music video for "It Do Take Nerve" broke 100,000 views on YouTube, marking the second time in a row Skyy accomplished this feat.

In November 2015, Skyy teamed up with Taryn Manning to release a remix of Lady Gaga's Grammy-nominated Til It Happens to You.

Skyy's music has been featured on MTV.com and LOGO TV, and has played in several national retail outlets including Planet Fitness, Gold's Gym, NYSC, and 24 Hour Fitness.
