= Inas X =

American singer-songwriter

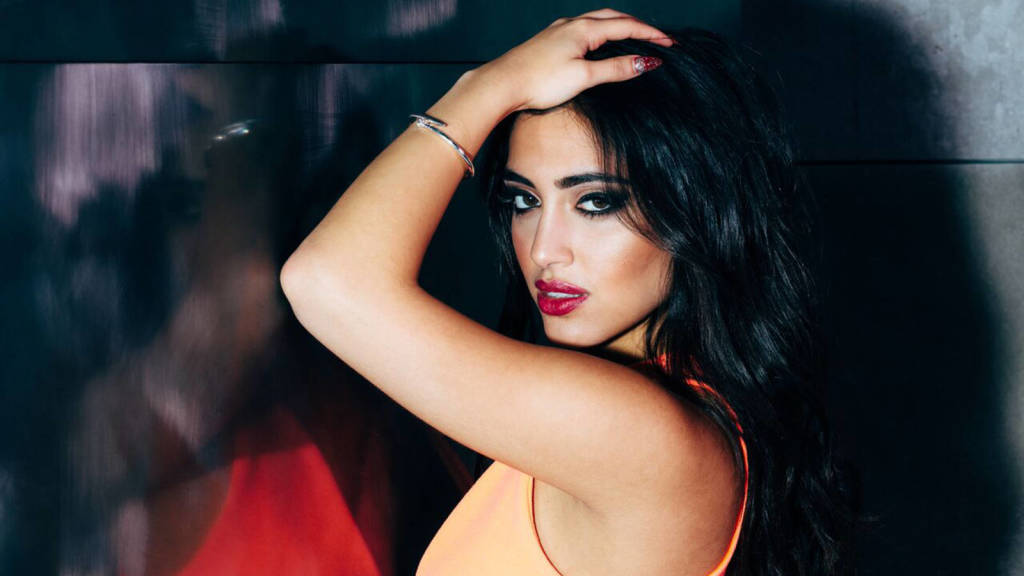

Background information
- Genres: Pop, R&B
- Occupation(s): Singer, recording artist
- Labels: Love X Entertainment
- Website: inasx.com

Inas X is an American singer of Palestinian descent. She is best known for her singles "Love Is", which reached No. 12 in the Billboard dance club songs charts, and "Stupid" featuring PnB Rock.

== Career ==
In November 2015, Inas X released "Love Is", which was later remixed by Remy Boy Monty.

In September 2016, Inas X released "Stupid" featuring PnB Rock, with a music video that premiered on MTV.

== Discography ==
=== Singles ===
==== As lead artist ====
Title	Year	Peak chart positions	Album
Title	Year	US Dance Club	Album
"Love Is"	2015	12	Non-album singles
"Gets Me High"	2016	—	Non-album singles
"Stupid" (featuring PnB Rock)	2016	—	Non-album singles
"No Love"	2018	—	Non-album singles
"Take It From Me"	2018	—	Non-album singles
"Bailalo"	2018	—	Non-album singles
"Lick on Me"	2019	—	Non-album singles
"Me 2"	2019	—	Non-album singles
"Bo$$"	2019	—	Non-album singles

== Touring ==
In 2016, Inas X opened for the Welcome to the Zoo tour: a twenty-two date tour that began on February 5 in Silver Spring, Maryland, and traveled across the United States through March, with stops in Boston, New York, Philadelphia, and Atlanta, finishing in Cincinnati on March 25.

In 2019, Inas X went on The Hood So Proud tour: a 17-date tour.
