= Radio Metro =

105.7 Radio Metro (4MET)
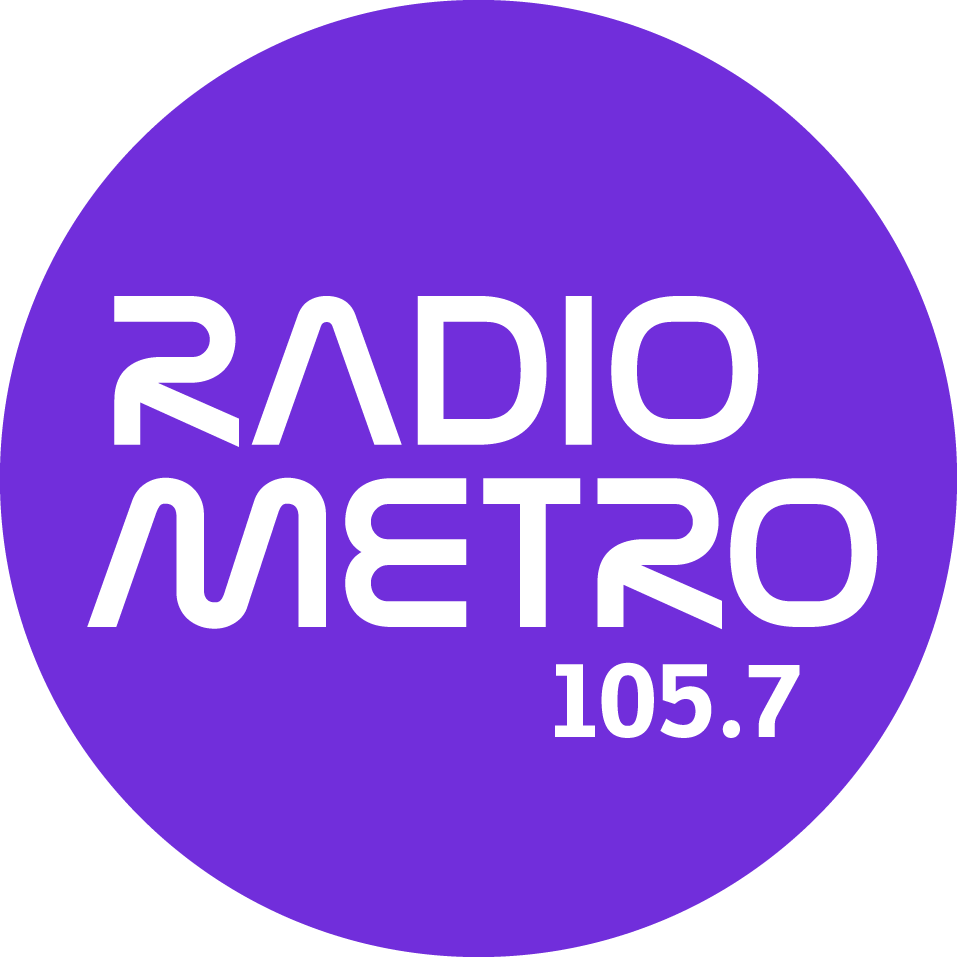
- Gold Coast; Australia
- Broadcast area: Gold Coast and Tweed Heads
- Frequency: 105.7 MHz

Programming
- Format: Top 40, R&B, Dance

Ownership
- Owner: Radio Metro Ltd

History
- First air date: July 1995
- Call sign meaning: "Metro"

Technical information
- Licensing authority: ACMA
- ERP: 10,000 watts
- Transmitter coordinates: 27.969604°S 153.213366°E

Links
- Public licence information: Profile
- Webcast: http://s1.voscast.com:10152/metro1057
- Website: https://radiometro.com.au/

Radio Metro is a community Australian radio station located on Gold Coast, Queensland.

It is the only youth community radio station on the Gold Coast. The majority of Radio Metro's demographic is between the ages of 15–44, specifically 18–24.

== History ==
=== 1995–2001: Hott FM ===
Radio Metro was originally broadcast as Hott FM in July 1995 from a shed in Nerang, Queensland on weekends with a weak mono signal. At the end of 1997, the Australian Broadcasting Authority (ABA- now the ACMA- Australian Communications and Media Authority) granted Radio Metro a full-time community broadcast permit.

=== 2001–2013: Radio Metro ===
Hott FM changed its name to Radio Metro in 2001. The station is available locally, nationally and internationally through the station website and play national and international Dance, R'n'b, Top 40 & Leftfield tracks.

== Programming ==
Programs on the station include the following:

- A State of Trance with Armin van Buuren
- Group Therapy with Above & Beyond
- SINPHONY Radio with Timmy Trumpet
- Tiësto's Club Life with Tiësto
- StereoHype with James Hype
- Jacked Radio with Afrojack
- Radio Wonderland Allison Wonderland
- Mau5trap Radio with Deadmau5
- The Spot with Solardo
- The 174 with Birdroy
- The Birdhouse with Claude VonStroke
- Aoki's House with Steve Aoki
- Heldeep Radio with Oliver Heldens
- The Martin Garrix Show
- Nervo Nation with Nervo
- Vicious Sound System with Vicious Recordings
