= You Have to Believe =

Single by Dave Audé featuring Olivia Newton-John and Chloe Lattanzi
- Released: August 10, 2015
- Genre: Electropop, dance-pop, house
- Length: 4:04
- Label: Audacious Music
- Songwriter(s): John Farrar, Chloe Lattanzi, Vassy, Dave Audé
- Producer(s): Dave Aude

Dave Audé singles chronology
"Circles" (2015)	"You Have to Believe" (2015)	"True Original" (2016)

"You Have to Believe" is a 2015 electronic dance song produced by American DJ/remixer/producer Dave Audé, featuring vocals from Australian singer/songwriter/actress Olivia Newton-John and her daughter, singer/actress Chloe Lattanzi. The song was written by Audé, John Farrar, Lattanzi, and Australian singer/songwriter, Vassy, and produced by Audé. The song was released on August 10, 2015 by Audacious Music. It topped Billboard Dance Club Songs chart for one week and peaked at #28 on the Dance/Electronic Songs chart.

== Background ==
The single is a reworking of Newton-John's 1980 single "Magic" from the soundtrack to the film Xanadu. The track made history for the three artists involved. For Audé, it became his 12th number one on Billboard's Dance Club Songs, the most ever by a producer, while Newton-John and Lattanzi became the first mother-daughter duo to reach number one together on the aforementioned chart, although in the case of Newton-John, she had charted four previous times, beginning with "Physical" in 1982, where it peaked at 22, while "The Rumour" was her highest charted single, peaking at 17 in 1988. "Magic" however, never charted Dance Club Songs or its predecessors.

In an interview with Billboard, Newton-John noted "It was actually Chloe's idea to rework 'Magic' and I was thrilled, as she is not only a great singer but a talented writer. It was a great collaboration across the board! And, a fun fact is that I met Chloe's dad on the set of Xanadu, so, without that film, Chloe wouldn't be here. She was the real 'magic' that came out of that film!" Lattanzi added that since "Magic" was her favorite song and well as her mother's, she thought that this would be a natural fit to do a new take on the song.

== Track listing ==
Digital download

1. "You Have to Believe" (feat. Olivia Newton-John & Chloe Lattanzi) - 3:53

The Remixes

1. "You Have to Believe" (feat. Olivia Newton-John & Chloe Lattanzi) [Jamlimmat & Dani Vars] - 5:17
2. "You Have to Believe" (feat. Olivia Newton-John & Chloe Lattanzi) [Chris Bedore Remix] - 5:27
3. "You Have to Believe" (feat. Olivia Newton-John & Chloe Lattanzi) [Big Kid Remix] - 6:52
4. "You Have to Believe" (feat. Olivia Newton-John & Chloe Lattanzi) [Bojan Remix] - 4:49
5. "You Have to Believe" (feat. Olivia Newton-John & Chloe Lattanzi) [Chris Sammarco Remix] - 6:02
6. "You Have to Believe" (feat. Olivia Newton-John & Chloe Lattanzi) [Glovibes & Dawna Montell Remix] - 5:41
7. "You Have to Believe" (feat. Olivia Newton-John & Chloe Lattanzi) [Giuseppe D Remix] - 6:07
8. "You Have to Believe" (feat. Olivia Newton-John & Chloe Lattanzi) [DJ Laszlo Remix] - 5:52
9. "You Have to Believe" (feat. Olivia Newton-John & Chloe Lattanzi) [C-Rod Remix] - 5:57
10. "You Have to Believe" (feat. Olivia Newton-John & Chloe Lattanzi) [Fragault & Marina Future Rave Remix]- 4:51

== Music video ==
A music video produced by Mike Easterling and directed by Jaala Ruffman was released on Olivia Newton-John's Vevo account on August 10, 2015, which was filmed in Las Vegas featuring the three artists with appearances by performers from Share Nightclub, The Neon Museum, Caesars, Divas, Legends, Chippendales, and Jubilee.

== Chart performance ==
The single debuted at number 39 on the Billboard Dance Club Songs chart in its September 26, 2015 issue, where thanks to remixes from Ivan Gomez & Nacho Chapado, Bojan and Chris Sammarco, the single fueled its run to the top spot in its November 21, 2015 issue.

=== Weekly charts ===
Chart (2015)	Peak position
US Hot Dance Club Songs (Billboard)	1
US Dance/Electronic Songs (Billboard)	28

=== Year-end charts ===
Chart (2015)	Position
US Dance Club Songs	21

== See also ==
- List of number-one dance singles of 2015 (U.S.)
