= Go! (Jupiter Rising song) =

Single by Jupiter Rising

from the album Jupiter Rising and Electropop
- Released: May 2, 2006 (radio)
- Genre: Dance-rock; funk rock; hip hop
- Length: 3:51
- Label: Chime
- Songwriter: Jupiter Rising
- Producer: Jupiter Rising

Jupiter Rising singles chronology
"Go!" (2006)	"Electropop" (2007)

Music video
- "Go!" (live at the Viper Room) on YouTube

Alternative cover
- iTunes EP cover

"Go!" is the debut single of American pop duo Jupiter Rising, taken from their first and second albums Jupiter Rising and Electropop. The song received notability when it was played on the Disney Channel Original Movie Jump In! and charted on the Hot Dance Airplay charting for 12 weeks, and 12 weeks on Billboard's Hot Dance Music/Club Airplay.

== Track listing ==
1. "Go!" (Pop Mix) – 3:27
2. "Go!" (Rhythm Mix) – 3:23

== Charts ==
Charts	Peak position
Hot Dance Airplay	7
Hot Dance Music/Club Airplay	24

== Release history ==
Release dates and formats for "Go!"
Region	Date	Format	Label(s)	Ref.
United States	May 2, 2006	Mainstream airplay	Chime	
