= Elektropop (Oleg song) =

Single by Oleg Nejlik

from the album En liten Cola tack
- Released: September 2011
- Recorded: 2011
- Genre: Synthpop
- Length: 3:01
- Label: Universal Music
- Songwriter: Oleg Nejlik
- Producer: Andrei Anouchka

Music video
- "Elektropop" on YouTube

"Elektropop" is a song by Oleg Nejlik that became his debut single on Sverigetopplistan, the official Swedish Singles Chart. Nejlik sang his original song in the premiere of Idol 2011, the eighth season of the Swedish Idol on 4 September 2011. Although he didn't qualify for the finals of the show, "Elektropop" became an instant hit with the Swedish public and charted on the Swedish Singles Chart.

== Commercial performance ==
Universal Music released the single in the same week that Oleg performed it on the show. It entered the Swedish Singles Chart at number 3 on 16 September 2011 and it stayed at that position for a second straight week, before slipping down. The song also placed at number 99 on the Swedish Singles year-end chart for 2011 and was certified Platinum.

== Charts ==
=== Weekly charts ===
Chart (2011)	Peak position	Certification
Sweden (Sverigetopplistan)	3	GLF: Platinum

=== Year-end charts ===
Chart (2011)	Position
Swedish Singles (Sverigetopplistan)	99
