= J786 =

American singer-songwriter

- Origin: United States
- Genres: Electropop, pop, dance
- Years active: 2010–present
- Label: Starbug Records
- Website: j786.net

j786 is an American singer-songwriter, philanthropist and a writer. j786 is signed with IAG Entertainment's Starbugs Records, a Hollywood-based Record Label active in scouting and developing gifted talent. j786 was launched on May 13, 2010, by IAG Entertainment.

== Purpose ==
j786 has agreed to donate 100% of all his profits that he earns through his music to charity. His identity remains unknown as he does not wish to seek fame and notoriety through music. He would rather raise money for the causes he believes in to help those Americans who cannot afford proper medical treatments due to unaffordable and expensive medical insurance premiums. He has joined the Free Medical Clinics network lately sponsored by MSNBC's Keith Olberman and others that are with him.

== Style ==
j786 has a unique style and blend of electronic, pop and dance music. j786 has commented on this by saying, "We're taking pop music back to its roots where it was refreshing and fun before it got diluted and became pop music of an unknown definition. I can say with confidence that we are ahead of the curve and starting a trend with the style of music we're bringing that consists of strong melodies and meaningful yet simple lyrics with a message."

== Discography ==
=== Albums ===
Rock Tonight is the name of j786's debut album and it was released September 21, 2010. The Album includes the lead self-titled debut single "Rock Tonight" Rock Tonight reached Billboard's Top Ten on "Dance and Club Charts" worldwide while the second song entitled "Outa Control" from the same CD made it to Billboard's Top 40 reaching to number 25 worldwide. J786's songs were featured on Sirius Radio, CHUM, KIIS, XM Top 20, Star Radio Top 40, and over 890 radio stations in USA and over 2000 radio stations worldwide reaching a combined audience of over 450 million listeners. J786 has received several citations and awards from City of Los Angeles, City of Beverly Hills, New York City, UNICEF, and over 38 national and international civic organizations.

=== Singles ===
- "I Like You" was released as the first single from the album on May 9, 2010, but failed to achieve any chart success.
- "Rock Tonight" is the second single and was released on iTunes on June 29, 2010. Grammy Nominated Dave Aude has done a radio mix of Rock Tonight, which was released on November 20, 2010.
- "Outta Control" was released as the third single from the album and has so far peaked at number 41 on the US Dance Charts.

List of singles, with selected chart positions, showing year released and album name
Title	Year	Peak chart positions		Album
Title	Year	US Dance	US	Album
"I Like You (I Wanna Be With You)"	2010	—		Rock Tonight
"Rock Tonight"	2010	46		Rock Tonight
"Outta Control"	2011	25		Rock Tonight
