= (We Are) Nexus =

American Electro-Pop act

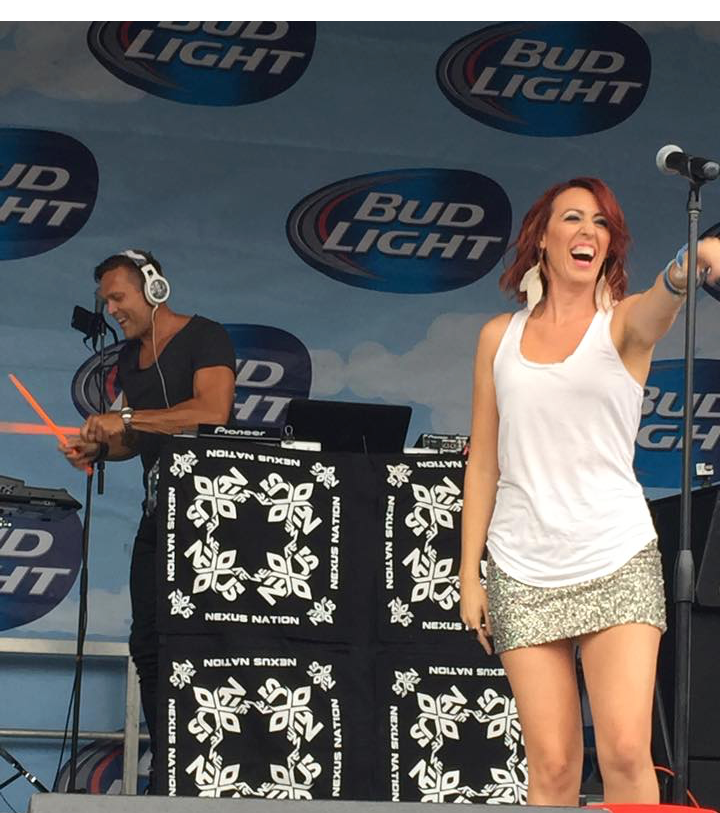
- (We Are) Nexus performing at Northalsted Market Days in Chicago, IL (From left to right: Nick Gunn, Carmen Rainier)

Background information
- Also known as: Nexus
- Origin: Chicago, Illinois, U.S.
- Genres: Electro-Pop, Pop
- Years active: 2012–present
- Label: Shotgunn Productions
- Members: Carmen Rainier; Nick Gunn
- Website: wearenexus.com

(We Are) Nexus is an American Electro-Pop act consisting of composer/producer Nick Gunn and lyricists/vocalist Carmen Rainier. The group officially formed in late 2012 in Chicago, IL.

== Musical career ==
=== Formation ===
Gunn and Rainier met in 2010 in Santa Barbara, CA and began working together immediately on an album for Gunn's World music career, Thirty-One Nights, released in September 2012. They began producing dance music together in 2012 and (We Are) Nexus was formed.

=== Releases ===
The first production released by (We Are) Nexus was a cover of Sonique's 1998 Trance hit classic "It Feels So Good."

It was released by Shotgun Productions on the 13th of August, 2013, as an EP. The "It Feels So Good EP" consisted of an original cover track produced by Nexus, titled "It Feels So Good (Original Mix)" and six remixes of this cover by artists/DJs Casey Alva, Flatdisk, Wayne G & LFB, Sinclair & Chatters the Tribe, Tony Marinos, and Neon Knights.

Their single "It Feels So Good (Flatdisk Electro Mix)," made Canada's Top 100 Overall iTunes Chart securing the #99 spot on August 17, 2013 and cracked the US iTunes Top 100 Dance Chart its first weekend out.

During the week of September 16, Nexus gained recognition from online dance music radio station Fusion Radio after "It Feels So Good (Flatdisk Electro Mix)" hit #3 on the "Fusion Top 100" list. In the same week, Nexus became the #1 Breakout Artist of the Week on the Billboard Hot Dance/Club Chart beating out nationally recognized "Foxes" for her collaboration with DJ and Producer Zedd. After becoming the #1 Breakout Artist of the Week on Billboard, Nexus made their debut on Billboard Dance Club Songs at #42 on the week of September 23 and rose steadily in the weeks following. Nexus also debuted on the Top 50 of Billboards Dance/Electronic Songs the week of October 26, 2013.

(We Are) Nexus' "It Feels So Good" peaked on Billboards Dance Club Songs and Dance/Electronic Songs charts the week of November 4, 2013, at #14 and #40, respectively.

In addition to releasing the "It Feels So Good" EP on 13 August 2013, Nexus also released through Shotgunn Productions another EP titled "Sound of the Beat."

After their initial success with "It Feels So Good," Nexus released their second album, "World Around Me," on January 28, 2014, which featured their original mix plus seven remixes from the likes of Flatdisk, Wayne G & LFB, and Grammy-nominated artist Mike Rizzo.

== Group members ==
=== Nick Gunn ===
Nicholas Graham Gunn was born in Rochester, Kent in South East England. He enjoyed playing the flute, and studied with the prestigious Royal Academy of Music from age seven till age eleven, when his family moved to Southern California. After moving to Southern California Gunn continued his classical flute studies under private instruction. During junior high school and high school Gunn played wind ensemble in the band during concert season and drums and percussion during the marching season.

With a passion for recording his own instrumental style of music out of high school, Gunn has enjoyed a successful twenty-year career in world music under the name Nicholas Gunn. He has recorded and produced fourteen albums in this genre and is a double-platinum artist. He has also been on the Billboard New Age charts for fifty consecutive weeks with his albums, "The Sacred Fire," "The Music of the Canyon," and "Thirty-One Nights." Gunn also owned and operated his own record label, Gemini Sun Records, which represented over seventy-five artists worldwide and grew to be one of the top New Age music labels. Gemini Sun closed in 2009.

=== Carmen Rainier ===
Carmen Rainier was born in Scarborough, ME. Upon moving to Southern California at the age of nine, she began acting, forming a teen acting group in Los Angeles during high school and acting in local community productions such as Tony Kushner's Angels in America. Leaving college after her sophomore year, Rainier spent most of her twenties traveling, having visited nearly twenty countries and living abroad in Spain, Costa Rica, and Guatemala. She eventually returned to the U.S. in 2010 and moved to Santa Barbara, CA to complete a degree in Global Studies from the University of California, Santa Barbara. It was during this time that Rainier began singing seriously and when she began working with Gunn.

In addition to being Nexus' lyricist and vocalist, Rainier is the owner and operator of Shotgunn Productions, the record label through which Nexus' first two EPs were released and the ASCAP registered publishing arm overseeing the (We Are) Nexus and Nicholas Gunn music catalog.

== Discography ==
=== Albums ===
Title	Album details	Peak chart positions		
Title	Album details	US	US Dance	US Club
It Feels So Good	Released: 18 August 2013; Label: Shotgunn Productions; Formats: Digital download	—	40	14
Sound of the Beat	Released: 18 August 2013; Label: Shotgunn Productions; Formats: Digital download	—	—	—
World Around Me	Released: 28 January 2014; Label: Shotgunn Productions; Formats: Digital download	—	—	43
Shamelessly	Released: 15 July 2014; Label: Shotgunn Productions; Formats: Digital download	—	—	—
Better Off Without You	Released: 19 August 2014; Label: Shotgunn Productions; Formats: Digital download	—	—	—
They'll Never Stop Me	Single: 24 February 2015; EP Remixes: 7 April 2015; Label: Shotgunn Productions; Formats: Digital download	—	—	—
One More Shot	Released: 11 September 2015; Label: Shotgunn Productions; Formats: Digital download	—	—	—
"—" denotes releases that did not chart or were not released in that territory.

=== Featured compilations ===
- "World Party 2014" (2014)

== Gallery ==
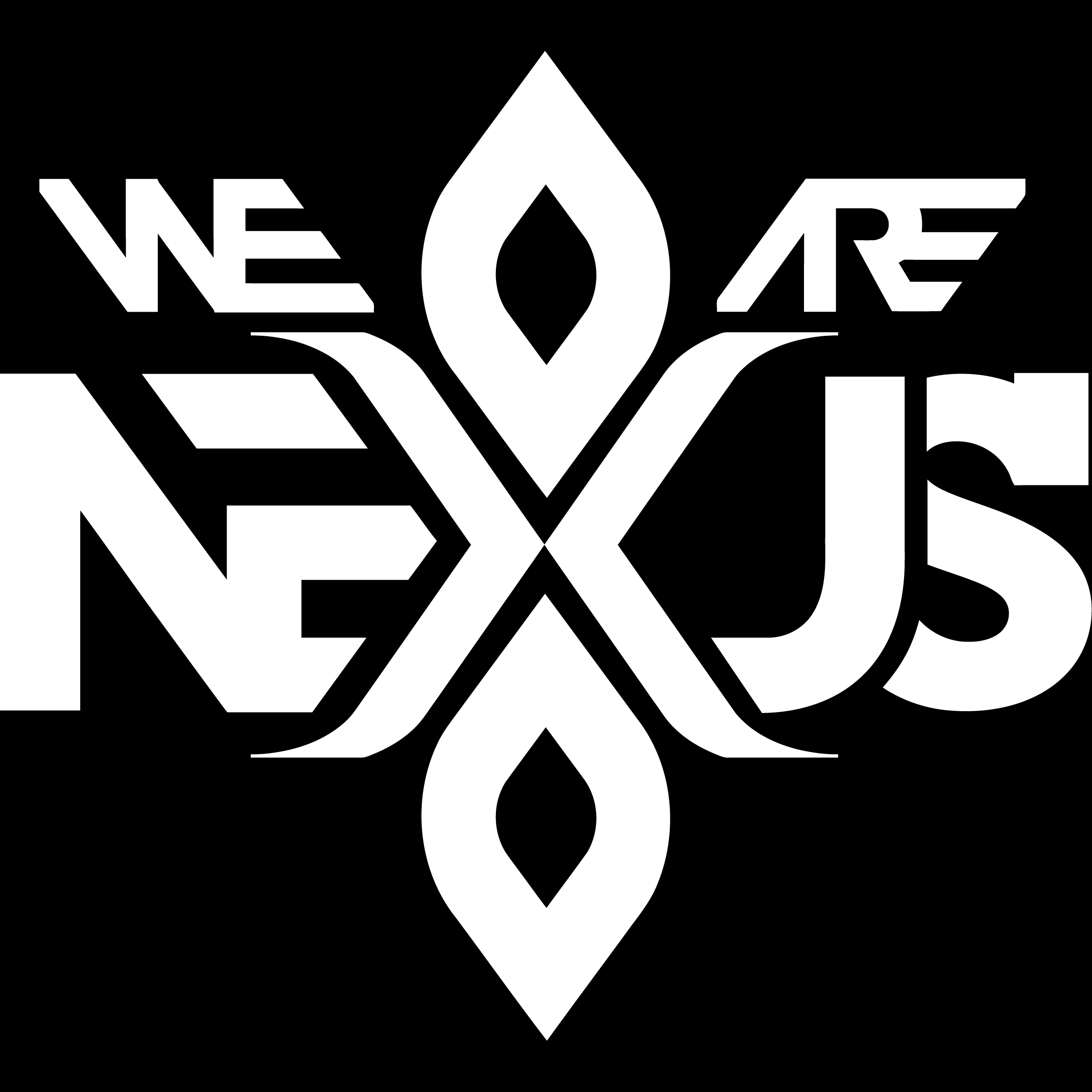
(We Are) Nexus White Logo
