= True Original =

Single by Dave Audé featuring Andy Bell
- Released: January 1, 2016
- Genre: Electropop, dance-pop
- Length: 3:11
- Label: Audacious Music
- Songwriter: Dave Aude
- Producer: Dave Aude

Dave Audé singles chronology
"You Have to Believe" (2015)	"True Original" (2016)	"Love Me Like You Mean It" (2016)

"True Original" is a song by Dave Audé featuring Andy Bell released on January 1, 2016.

The song reached number one on the US Billboard Dance Club Songs chart as of the issue dated March 12, 2016. It is the second song by the pair to reach number one, the first being "Aftermath (Here We Go)" which reached the summit in August 2014. Both Audé and Bell have made numerous appearances on the Billboard Dance Club Songs chart, with Audé reaching #1 thirteen times, and Bell four - his other two #1s were as the vocalist for the duo Erasure. Audé is now tied with Enrique Iglesias and Pitbull for most #1's among males on the US Dance Club chart.

== Track listings ==
Digital download

1. "True Original" (feat. Andy Bell) - 3:11
2. "True Original" (feat. Andy Bell) [Extended Mix] - 4:09
3. "True Original" (feat. Andy Bell) [Denzal Park Club] - 5:35
4. "True Original" (feat. Andy Bell) [Denzal Park Dub] - 4:39
5. "True Original" (feat. Andy Bell) [Stonebridge Mix] - 5:00
6. "True Original" (feat. Andy Bell) [Stonebridge Dub] - 4:15
7. "True Original" (feat. Andy Bell) [Nacho Chapado & Ivan Gomez Club] - 6:39
8. "True Original" (feat. Andy Bell) [Nacho Chapado & Ivan Gomez Dub] - 6:39

== Chart ==
=== Weekly charts ===
Chart (2016)	Peak position
US Dance Club Songs (Billboard)	1

=== Year-end charts ===
Chart (2016)	Position
US Dance Club Songs (Billboard)	7

== See also ==
- List of number-one dance singles of 2016 (U.S.)
