= Ysa Ferrer =

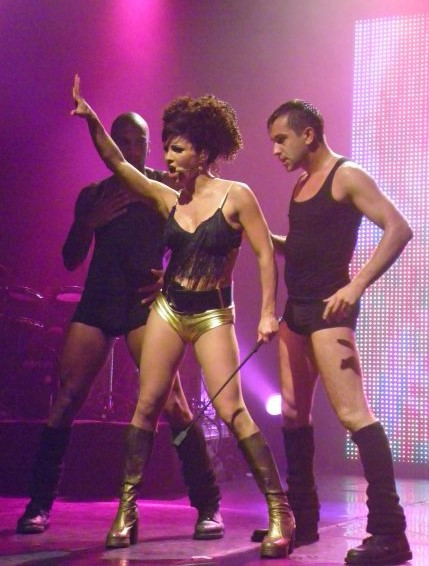
- Ysa Ferrer's 4th album : "Ultra Ferrer"

Background information
- Born: Ysa Ferrer; 4 June 1972 (age 54); Oran, Algeria
- Genres: Pop, rock, dance, electronic
- Occupations: Singer, Composer, Actress, Record Producer
- Years active: 1992 –present
- Labels: Lovarium Production / Rue Stendhal (Since 2007); East West / Warner Music (2002–2007); EMI Music (2000–2002); Polydor / Universal Music (1995–2000)
- Website: www.ysaferrer.com

Ysa Ferrer (born 4 June 1972 in Oran, Algeria) is a French actress and singer.

== Biography ==
Ysa Ferrer was born in Oran (Algeria) to an Egyptian father and a French mother. She was a teenager when she started to work for a local radio station in France. Very quickly, she moved to Paris and after only a few auditions, she was chosen to play one of the leading roles in a popular TV series. At the same time she also started to act in movies for the cinema.

However Ysa knew that her real love was music. During her days off she worked on demos. In 1995, she signed a deal with Universal Music France. Two albums were released : "D'essences naturelles" in 1995 and "Kamikaze", which contained her hit single "Mes rêves", followed in 1998.

After several singles ("Mourir pour elles" – EMI Records and "Made in Japan"- East-West France), she released a dance version of Goran Bregovic's song "Ederlezi". The track was a hit in Sweden (top 20) and all eastern Europe (Germany and Russia especially).

In 2007, she founded her own production company, Lovarium Production, and started to work on her own. Since then she has released several hits taken from her third album "Imaginaire Pur" ("On fait l'amour", which contains a sample from Rondo Veneziano, "Sens Interdit", "Last Zoom") .

Writer, composer and singer, Ysa Ferrer is regarded as the French "Kylie Minogue". Her dance/electro style, called "Pop Kosmic" is very popular in France and Russia especially in the LGBTQ community where she is considered as a true icon.

"After the release of my latest album and his unexpected success in the eastern countries in particular, I decided to work harder than ever. The last two years have been intense, productive and full of emotion. I realized how beautiful my fans are and I wanted to meet them again and again", says Ysa Ferrer.

In 2010, Ysa released "French Kiss" produced by Chew Fu. Once again the single was an instant success in Russia.

Ysa Ferrer's fourth album "Ultra Ferrer" was released in October, just days before her "Paradoxal Show" premiere, on 16 October 2010 in the legendary Parisian venue "Bobino".

== Discography ==
=== Albums ===
- 1995 : D'essences naturelles
- 1998 : Kamikaze
- 2008 : Imaginaire pur
- 2008 : Kamikaze 2.0 (Reissue)
- 2009 : Imaginaire pur reloaded (Reissue)
- 2010 : Ultra Ferrer
- 2014 : Sanguine
- 2018 : X Y Z

=== Singles ===
- 1995 : À coups de Typ-Ex
- 1996 : 109 en 95
- 1996 : Ne me chasse pas
- 1997 : Mes rêves
- 1998 : Les yeux dans les yeux
- 1998 : Tu sais, I know
- 1999 : Flash in the Night
- 2000 : Mourir pour elles
- 2003 : Made in Japan
- 2004 : Ederlezi (feat. Richi M)
- 2008 : To Bi Or Not To Bi
- 2008 : On fait l'amour
- 2009 : Sens interdit
- 2009 : Last Zoom
- 2010 : French Kiss
- 2010 : Hands Up
- 2011 : Je Vois
- 2011 : Brille
- 2012 : Pom Pom Girl
- 2014 : POP
- 2014 : Folle De Vouloir Continuer
- 2014 : Made in Japan Remix (feat. Belka)
- 2015 : Où êtes-vous Mylène ?
- 2015 : God Save The Queen
- 2015 : D'un Peu Live
- 2015 : No Time To Cook
- 2015 : Qui Sait
- 2018 : Née Sous X
- 2018 : La Moitie de Moi-Meme
- 2019 : Vivre
- 2019 : Follow Me
- 2020 : Je sortirai grandie
- 2020 : Demande à la pousière
- 2021 : To The World
- 2021 : Tout Un Poème
- 2023 : Let You Go (feat Nyls)
- 2024 : Souviens-toi
- 2025 : La fée qui cloche
- 2025 : L'été indien

=== DVD ===
- 2009 : Ysa Ferrer à la Nouvelle Ève

== Others ==
- Gay icon
