= Electropop (album) =

Studio album by Jupiter Rising
- Released: September 11, 2007
- Recorded: 2007
- Genre: Electropop
- Length: 40:50
- Label: Chime
- Producer: Marc Tanner, Jason Villaroman, Spencer Nezey

Jupiter Rising chronology
Jupiter Rising (2006)	Electropop (2007)	L.A. Girls/Tres Cool (2008)

Singles from Electropop
- 1. "Electropop" Released: June 19, 2007; 2. "Wicked Remix EP" Released: May 6, 2008

Electropop is the second studio album by pop/ electronic dance/ hip hop music group Jupiter Rising released by Chime Entertainment on September 11, 2007. The album featured the singles Electropop and Go!.

== Critical response ==
Professional ratings
Review scores
Source	Rating
PopMatters	7/10 stars
CD Universe	4/5 stars

The album received positive reviews. Lauren Mooney's of URB Magazine review of the album (and Jessie Payo) is very positive:

Before dismissing Jessie Payo as just another pretty face in the mass production of dance tracks, listen to what Jupiter Rising's founder Spencer Nezey has to say, "I know I can trust Jessie. Without her, there would be no Electropop." Sounds serious. In the first single that shares the same title as the album, Jessie sings "I may be your sweet spot/Take me to your candy shop." Layer in some old-school beats and synth and you've got a catchy track that manages to sound fresh and retro at the same time. Splendid.

Evan Sawdey of PopMatters had this to say about the album:

“Hero” is the big Mariah-styled ballad, but Payo never overuses her pipes like Mimi does: she has the occasional flutter, but that’s it. Her vocal presence is distinct, powerful, and full of personality. Same goes for Nezey’s productions, even though he can’t really decide if he wants to be the next David Foster or the next Timbaland. The excellent “Go!” is Nelly Furtado with a rock edge, and “Foolish” comes off like a great Amy Winehouse B-side (even if its bridge is a little weak). Even with the great moments of genre deviations (like the jazz-pop of “They Say"), Jupiter Rising feels most comfortable when they’re up-tempo. The title track has the flirtatious banter of Furtado’s “Promiscuous”, a ready-made synth club beat, and even gives a slight name drop for 50 Cent’s “Candy Shop”—it’s ridiculous fun. Notice all the name-dropping that’s been going on? Jupiter Rising never pretend to be doing anything profoundly different—they’re just taking the best parts of all their favorite songs and styles and mixing them together into on concise little album. Electropop is far from groundbreaking, but who needs to be revolutionary when you’re having so much fun?

== Track listing ==
No.	Title	Writer(s)	Length
1.	"Electropop"	Jupiter Rising	3:51
2.	"Go!"	Jupiter Rising	3:25
3.	"Liv The Day"	Jupiter Rising	3:26
4.	"Hero"	Jupiter Rising	4:41
5.	"The Bus"	Jupiter Rising	3:40
6.	"Home"	Jupiter Rising	3:59
7.	"Wicked"	Jupiter Rising	3:45
8.	"Frenz"	Jupiter Rising	3:56
9.	"They Say"	Jupiter Rising	3:13
10.	"Foolish"	Jupiter Rising	3:39
11.	"Wish"	Jupiter Rising	3:15
Total length:			40:50

== Singles and music videos ==
=== "Electropop" ===
"Electropop" was released to digital stores on June 19, 2007. The music video was released 3 days after. Electropop charted 15th on the Hot Dance Music/Club Airplay and 17th on Billboard's Hot Dance Airplay. The Remixes EP was released November 20, 2007.

=== "Wicked" ===
"Wicked Remix EP" was made available for digital download on May 6, 2008.

== Credits ==
- Ron Coro -Creative Director, Logo Design
- Samuel Formicola- Group
- Ludvig Girdland -Strings, Group
- Bob Glaub -Bass
- Marc Greene -Engineer
- Robert Hadley -Mastering
- Quincy McCrary -Piano, Keyboards, Vocals (background)
- Paul Mirkovich -String Arrangements
- Spencer Nezey -Synthesizer, Composer, Keyboards, Programming, Vocals, Producer, Beatbox
- Jessie Payo -Vocals, Harmony Vocals, Group Member
- Christopher "Kid" Reid -MC, Guest Appearance
- Mike Shapiro -Bass, Percussion, Drums
- Joe Smith -Engineer
- Caleb Speir -Bass
- Alan Steinberger -Piano, Keyboards
- Cameron Stone -Strings, Group
- Craig Stull Guitar (Electric), Spanish Guitar
- Ian Suddarth -Engineer
- Marc Tanner- Producer, A&R
- Jason Villaroman- Producer, Engineer
- Ethan Willoughby- Mixing
