= Jupiter Rising =

American musical duo

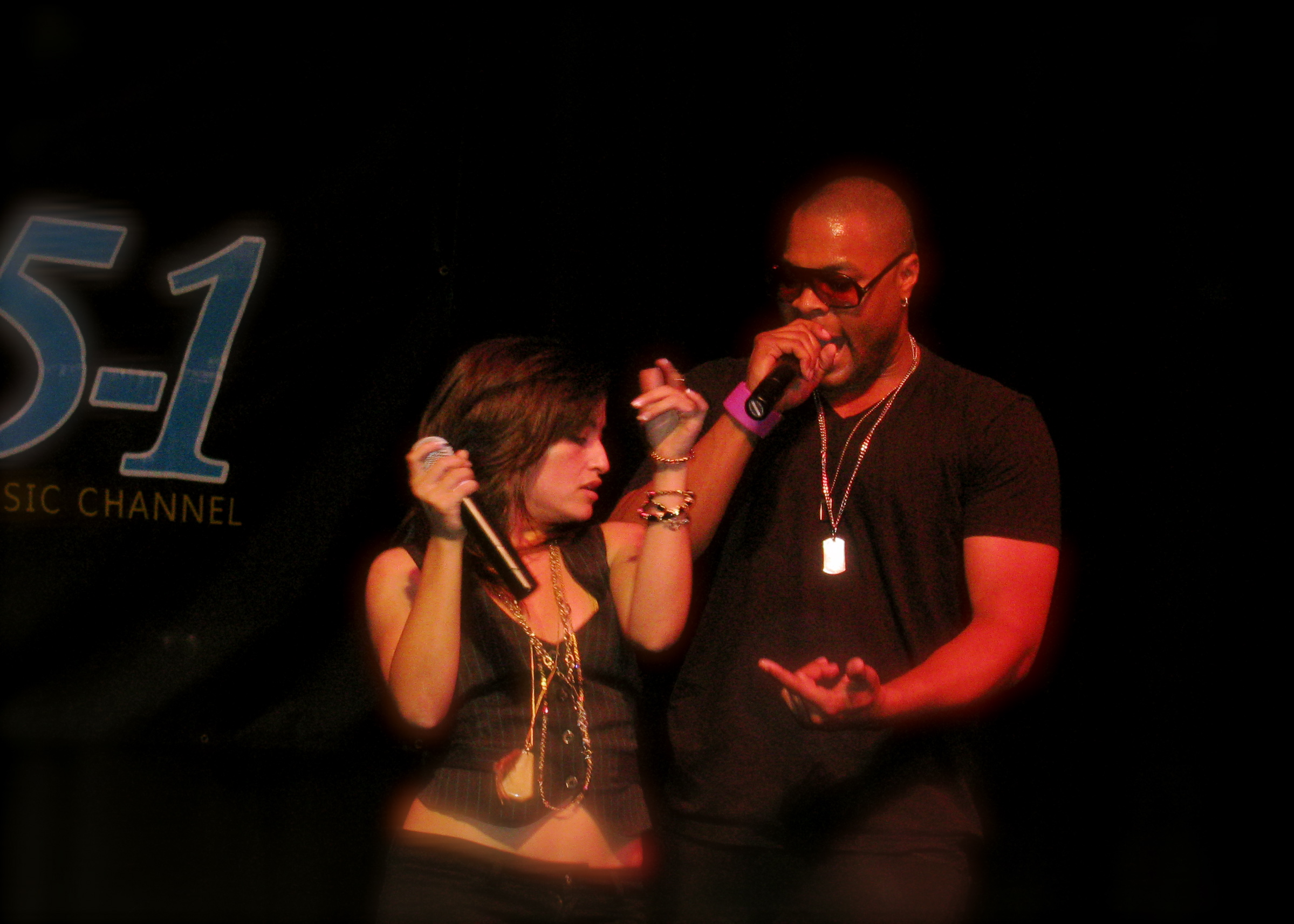

Background information
- Genres: Dance-rock, funk, pop rap, electropop, pop rock, dance-pop
- Years active: 2005–2010
- Label: Chime
- Members: Jessie Payo; Spencer Nezey
- Past members: 80.Bug; Bjorn Fleuren

Jupiter Rising was an American pop duo consisting of Jessie Payo and Spencer Nezey. The band was signed to Chime Entertainment and formed in 2005. They are best known for their songs "Go!", which was also featured on the soundtrack to Jump In!, and "Electropop", which topped the dance charts and achieved a million plays on Myspace.

== Members ==
- Jessie Payo - lead vocals, songwriting, co-production
- Spencer Nezey - vocals, beatbox, production, songwriting

The band described their music on their Myspace account as a fusion of pop, rock, hip hop, folk, punk, downtempo, drum & bass and funk.

=== Former members ===
- 80.Bug - Lead Singer/ Songwriter/Founder
- Bjorn Fleuren - Bassist/Music Director

== Singles ==
Their song "Go!" hit #24 on Billboard magazine's Hot Dance Music/Club Play chart, and received some airplay on radio stations across the United States. The song was used in commercials for Chevrolet, Fox Sports, and Major League Baseball. It was also used by at least four sporting teams at their arena/stadium. It was used in a commercial for Feel the Noise and some other Disney commercials. "Go!" was also featured in the DCOM Jump In!, as well as in Wendy Wu: Homecoming Warrior, along with "Hero". It was also used in a commercial for Dance on Sunset.

The group's songs "Home" and "Hero" have been used on Making The Band 3. "Hero" has also been featured in the International Museum of Women's exhibition Imagining Ourselves and the TV show The Unit. The band was featured on a piece on The Insider.

In 2007, the band released their single "Electropop" to Sirius Satellite Radio. It was released to the iTunes Music Store on June 19 as a single.

== Discography ==
- Jupiter Rising - released on September 26, 2006
- Electropop - released September 11, 2007
- Tres Cool, L.A. Girls EP - released December 16, 2008
- The Quiet Hype - released March 17, 2009

== Appearances ==
In 2006 Jupiter Rising appeared on CBS'sThe Insider (TV series) and were interviewed by Pat O'Brien. In 2007 Jupiter Rising appeared on MTV's My Super Sweet 16. They were interviewed and performed at Bobby Strauser's party. Jupiter Rising's single "LA Girls" was debuted on MTV's The Hills on November 17, 2008. Also featured on The Hills was "Flip My Switch" and "Tres Cool".

Jupiter Rising's song "Guarded" was debuted on MTV's The City (MTV series) in the first season of the show. On March 2, 2009, The City (MTV series) also featured their single "Falling Away" and on March 16, 2009, Jupiter Rising's song "Quicksand" was also highlighted in the season finale of the show. The band has also been featured in season 2 of The City (MTV series) with their song "New York Girls" airing in the October 16, 2009 episode.

On March 16, 2009, Jupiter Rising was interviewed by Clinton Sparks and was featured on E!'s Daily 10. Jupiter Rising's song "Tres Cool" was featured in an episode of the CBS television show Criminal Minds on April 8, 2009. Jupiter Rising's song "Home" was featured in the VH1 romantic comedy series, Single Ladies on the "Cry Me A River" episode.
