= 2018 Golden Joystick Awards =

Video game awards ceremony

- Date: November 16, 2018
- Venue: Bloomsbury Big Top
- Country: United Kingdom
- Hosted by: Danny Wallace

Highlights
- Most awards: God of War (4)
- Game of the Year: Fortnite Battle Royale
- Lifetime Achievement: Hidetaka Miyazaki

The 2018 Golden Joystick Awards was the 36th edition of the Golden Joystick Awards, an annual awards event that honored the best video games of that year. The event was hosted by comedian Danny Wallace, and took place at the Bloomsbury Big Top in London on November 16, 2018.

== Awards and nominations ==
Titles in bold won their respective category.

Best Storytelling	Best Visual Design
**God of War**; The Banner Saga 3; Forgotton Anne; Gorogoa; Marvel's Spider-Man; Octopath Traveler; Pillars of Eternity II: Deadfire; Reigns: Her Majesty; Unavowed; Yakuza 6: The Song of Life	**God of War**; Chuchel; Dead Cells; Dragon Ball FighterZ; FAR: Lone Sails; Frostpunk; Gorogoa; Monster Hunter: World; Subnautica; We Happy Few
Best Audio Design	Best Indie Game
**God of War**; Far Cry 5; Forza Horizon 4; Jurassic World Evolution; Just Shapes & Beats; Life Is Strange 2; Monster Hunter: World; Sea of Thieves; Shadow of the Tomb Raider; Subnautica	**Dead Cells**; Celeste; Gorogoa; Into the Breach; Just Shapes & Beats; Laser League; Minit; Opus Magnum; Owlboy; SteamWorld Dig 2
Best Competitive Game	Best Co-operative Game
**Fortnite Battle Royale**; Arena of Valor; Call of Duty: WWII; Dragon Ball FighterZ; FIFA 19; Forza Horizon 4; Laser League; Mario Tennis Aces; PES 2019; Paladins	**Monster Hunter: World**; Far Cry 5; Firewall Zero Hour; No Man's Sky Next; Overcooked 2; Sea of Thieves; State of Decay 2; Unravel Two; Warhammer: Vermintide 2; A Way Out
Still Playing Award	E-Sports Game of the Year
**World of Tanks**; Destiny 2; Final Fantasy XIV; Hearthstone; Overwatch; PlayerUnknown's Battlegrounds; Pokémon Go; Rainbow Six Siege; Warframe; World of Warcraft	**Overwatch**; Counter-Strike: Global Offensive; Dota 2; Dragon Ball FighterZ; FIFA 18; League of Legends; Rainbow Six Siege; Rocket League; Street Fighter V
Best Mobile Game	Best Nintendo Game
**PlayerUnknown's Battlegrounds**; Animal Crossing: Pocket Camp; Donut County; Florence; Fortnite Battle Royale; GNOG; Million Onion Hotel; Pokémon Quest; Reigns: Her Majesty	**Octopath Traveler**; Captain Toad: Treasure Tracker; De Blob 2; Detective Pikachu; Donkey Kong Country: Tropical Freeze; Hollow Knight; Mario Tennis Aces; Nintendo Labo; WarioWare Gold
Best PlayStation Game	Best PC Game
**God of War**; Detroit: Become Human; Firewall: Zero Hour; Marvel's Spider-Man; Moss; Ni no Kuni II: Revenant Kingdom; The Persistence; Shadow of the Colossus; Yakuza 6: The Song of Life	**Subnautica**; Battletech; Frostpunk; Into the Breach; Kingdom Come: Deliverance; Opus Magnum; Pillars of Eternity II: Deadfire; Surviving Mars; Two Point Hospital; Warhammer: Vermintide 2
Best Xbox Game	Best VR Game
**Forza Horizon 4**; Hellblade: Senua's Sacrifice; Nier: Automata; No Man's Sky Next; PlayerUnknown's Battlegrounds; Sea of Thieves; State of Decay 2; Warhammer: Vermintide 2	**The Elder Scrolls V: Skyrim VR**; Firewall Zero Hour; Flotilla 2; GNOG; Moss; The Persistence; Sprint Vector; Transference; Wipeout Omega Collection
Most Wanted Game	Studio of the Year
**Cyberpunk 2077**; Anthem; Battlefield V; Control; Death Stranding; Doom Eternal; Dreams; Ghost of Tsushima; Kingdom Hearts III; The Last of Us Part II; Metro Exodus; Ooblets; Sekiro: Shadows Die Twice; Super Smash Bros. Ultimate	**Santa Monica Studio**; Bluepoint Games; Capcom; Epic Games; Insomniac Games; Motion Twin; Rare; Stoic; Subset Games; Unknown Worlds Entertainment
Best Streamer/Broadcaster	Breakthrough Award
**Bryan Dechart** and **Amelia Rose Blaire**	**Unknown Worlds Entertainment**
Critics Choice Award	Lifetime Achievement Award
**Red Dead Redemption 2**	**Hidetaka Miyazaki**
Best Performer	Outstanding Contribution
**Bryan Dechart** as Connor (**Detroit: Become Human**)	**Xbox Adaptive Controller**
