= Adam Williams (writer) =

British video game designer and writer

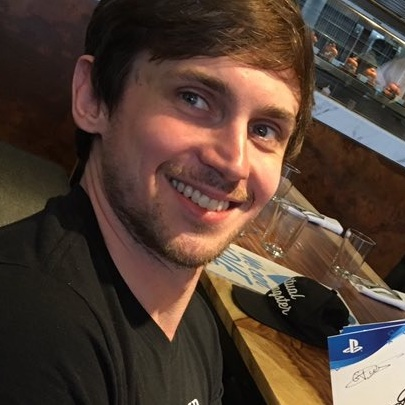
- Williams in 2024
- Occupation: Video game writer
- Years active: 2017–present
- Employer: Republic Games
- Known for: Detroit: Become Human

Adam Williams is a video game writer and a former lead writer for Quantic Dream. His credits include lead writer of Detroit: Become Human, an award-winning game and the company's best-selling title in 2022, and the upcoming Star Wars: Eclipse.

Williams left Quantic Dream in 2024 and founded Republic Games.

== Career ==
=== Quantic Dream ===
Williams' background is in television writing but he was interested in the interactive storytelling and choice-based narrative of video games, and the numerous outcomes that arise from those decisions as opposed to linear narratives. He communicated with Quantic Dream's founder David Cage to ask questions about the video game industry. The correspondences developed into a formal job offering, which Williams accepted. The biggest challenge for Williams in shifting from TV to video games was transitioning from writing storylines for a viewer to passively observe to the viewer being an active participant in the outcome.

Williams said the themes he and Cage explored in Detroit: Become Human were anxieties revolving around technology replacing human labor and identity, if technology could become more than a tool and the changing relationship between humans and technology. He defended the depictions of domestic violence and violence against children in the game when a trailer was shown at Paris Games Week in 2017, saying the depictions explored real problems within society and were used to tell a meaningful story, not to glorify violence; he also argued that there's no reason why these themes can't be explored in games when they are in other media like movies and books. He said: "I can still assure you that we continue to remain true to our vision, and to David Cage's vision, of telling an honest story with real impact. We won't shy away from where the story takes us, as long as it's consistent with our values as game creators. We would never tell a story that glorifies any kind of violence or social issue, but we believe the game would not have the same impact if something uncomfortable never happened, or there were no serious consequences to the player's choices."

=== Republic Games ===
In August 2024, Williams posted on LinkedIn that, after 10 years and being the head writer of the upcoming title, Star Wars: Eclipse, he had left Quantic Dream to form his own company. Though Williams departed the company and his role, Quantic Dream stated Star Wars: Eclipse "still exists" when the departure was announced.

In November 2024, Williams announced the founding of Republic Games, with the financial backing of South Korean video game publisher Krafton. The company’s first project is a dystopian fantasy game described as "A tyrannical regime is brutally enforcing its ideology and crushing all dissent. But a faction of rebels seeks to overturn the tyrants and expose the lies at the heart of their doctrine."

Voice actors Bryan Dechart and Amelia Rose Blaire, who appeared in Detroit: Become Human were also reported as working with Williams and Republic Games on the project. Video game and role-playing game writer Chris Avellone is also working on the project.
