= Andrii Dankovych =

Ukrainian illustrator, author of comics

- Андрій Данкович
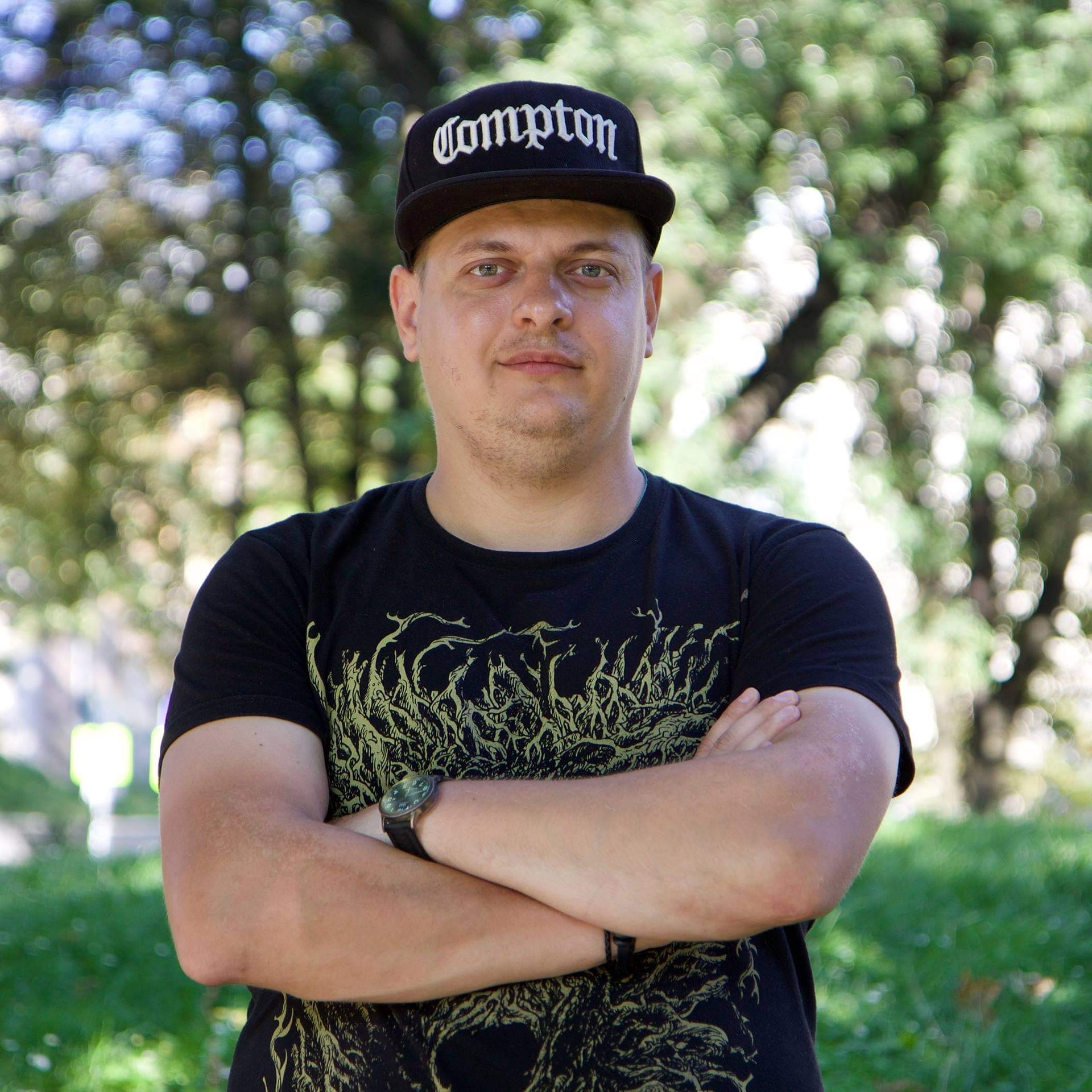
- Born: 1 July 1987 (age 39); Lolyn, Ivano-Frankivsk Oblast, Ukrainian SSR, Soviet Union
- Education: Ukrainian Academy of Printing

Andrii Vasyliovych Dankovych (Ukrainian: Андрій Васильович Данкович, born 1 July 1987) is a Ukrainian illustrator, author of comics on science fiction and fantasy themes.

== Biography ==
He studied at the Dolyna Children's Art School (2004) and the Ukrainian Academy of Printing (2009).

== Creativity ==
He has been drawing since the age of 4. His main genres are science fiction, horror, and dark fantasy.

Participated in the Kyiv Comic Con, Comic Con Ukraine, Arsenal Book Festival, Book Forum Lviv, San Diego Comic-Con (2017, 2018).

Author of the books Sarcophagus (2016), War of the Gods (2016), World 912 (2016), Sleep (2016), Bane (2018, 2019, published in Polish).

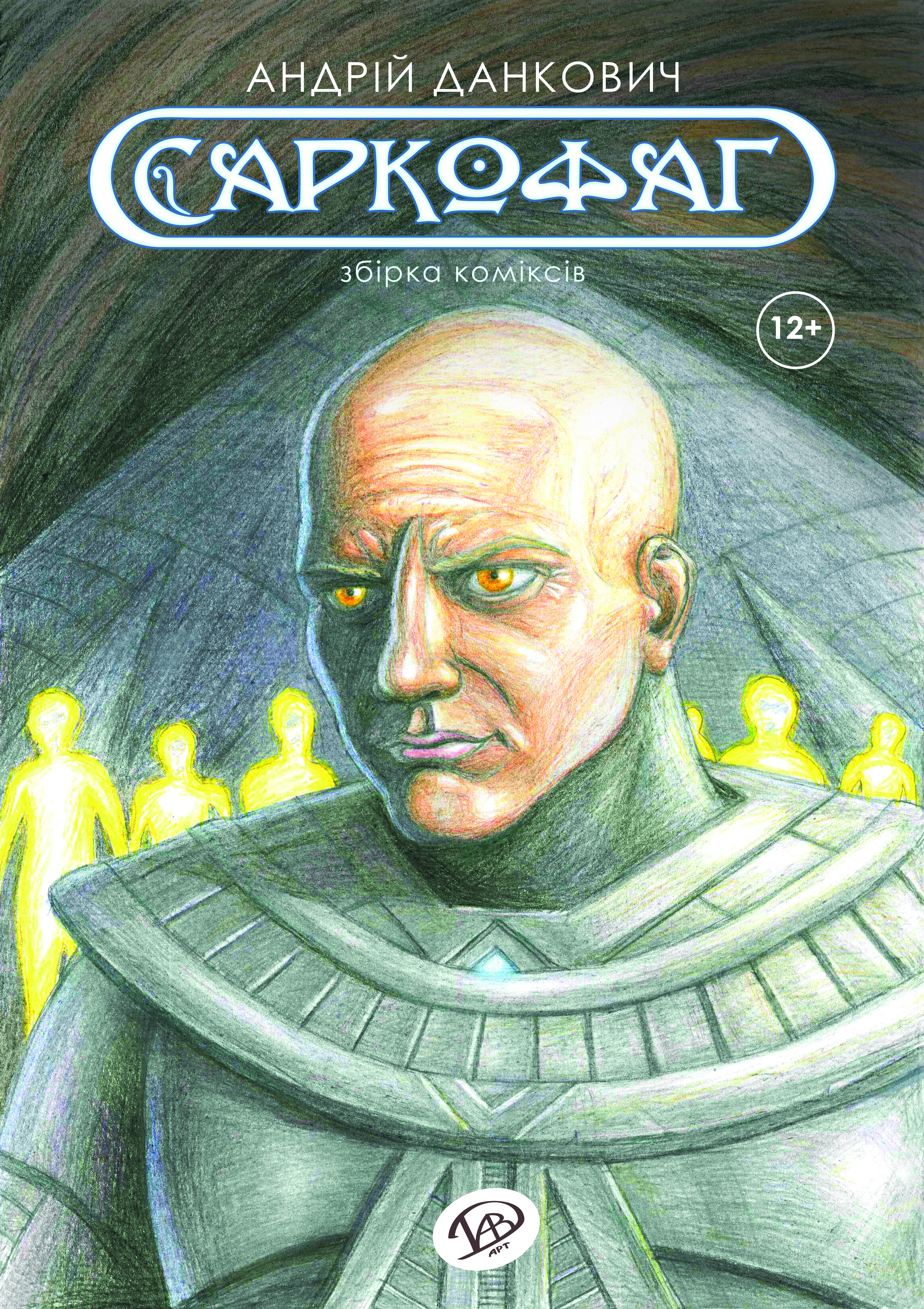
Sarcophagus

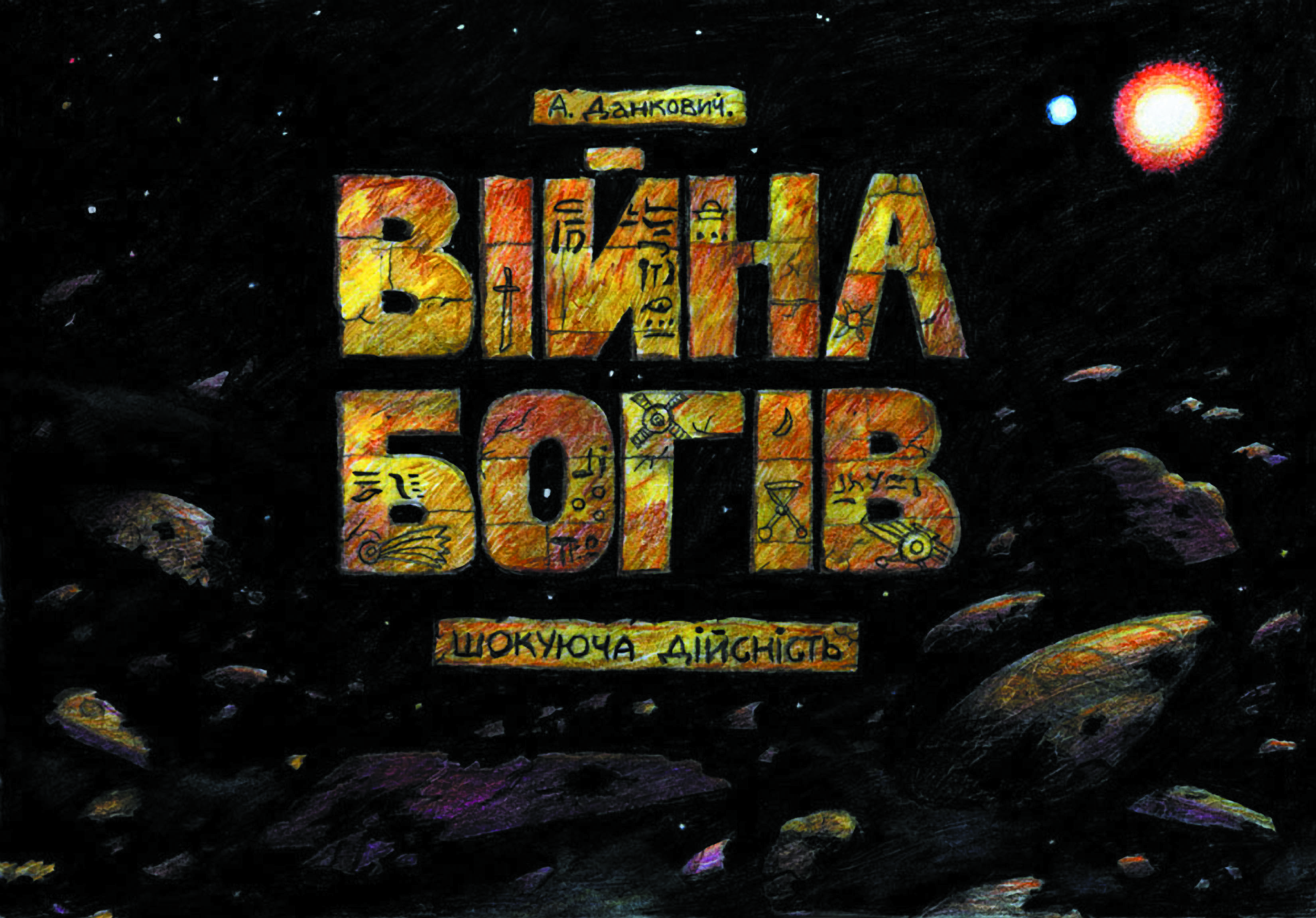
War of the Gods

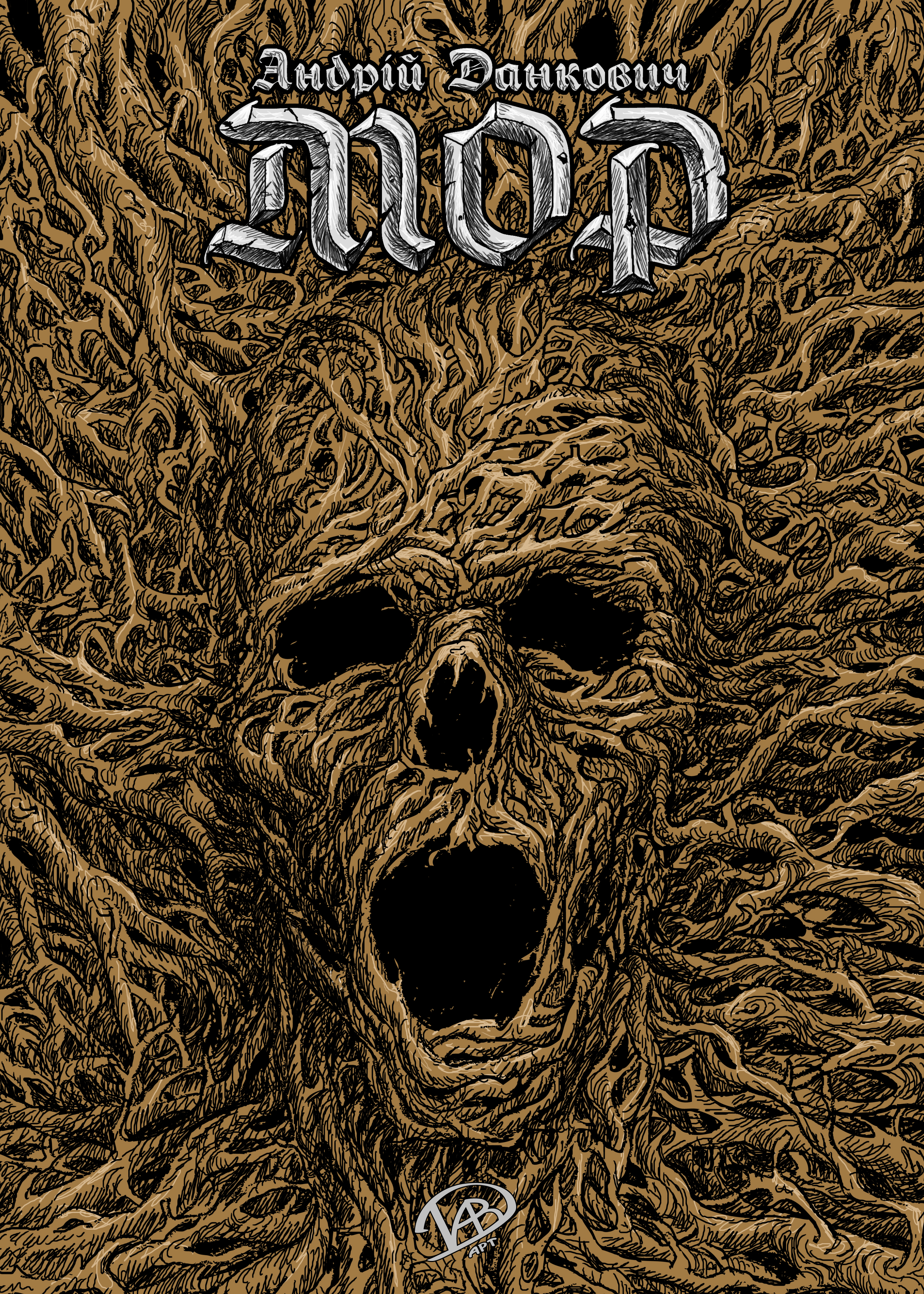
Bane

His works are exhibited in the United States, the United Kingdom, Canada, Germany, the Netherlands, Italy, Spain, South Africa, Brazil, Mexico, Australia, New Zealand, the United Arab Emirates, Saudi Arabia, Singapore, and many others.

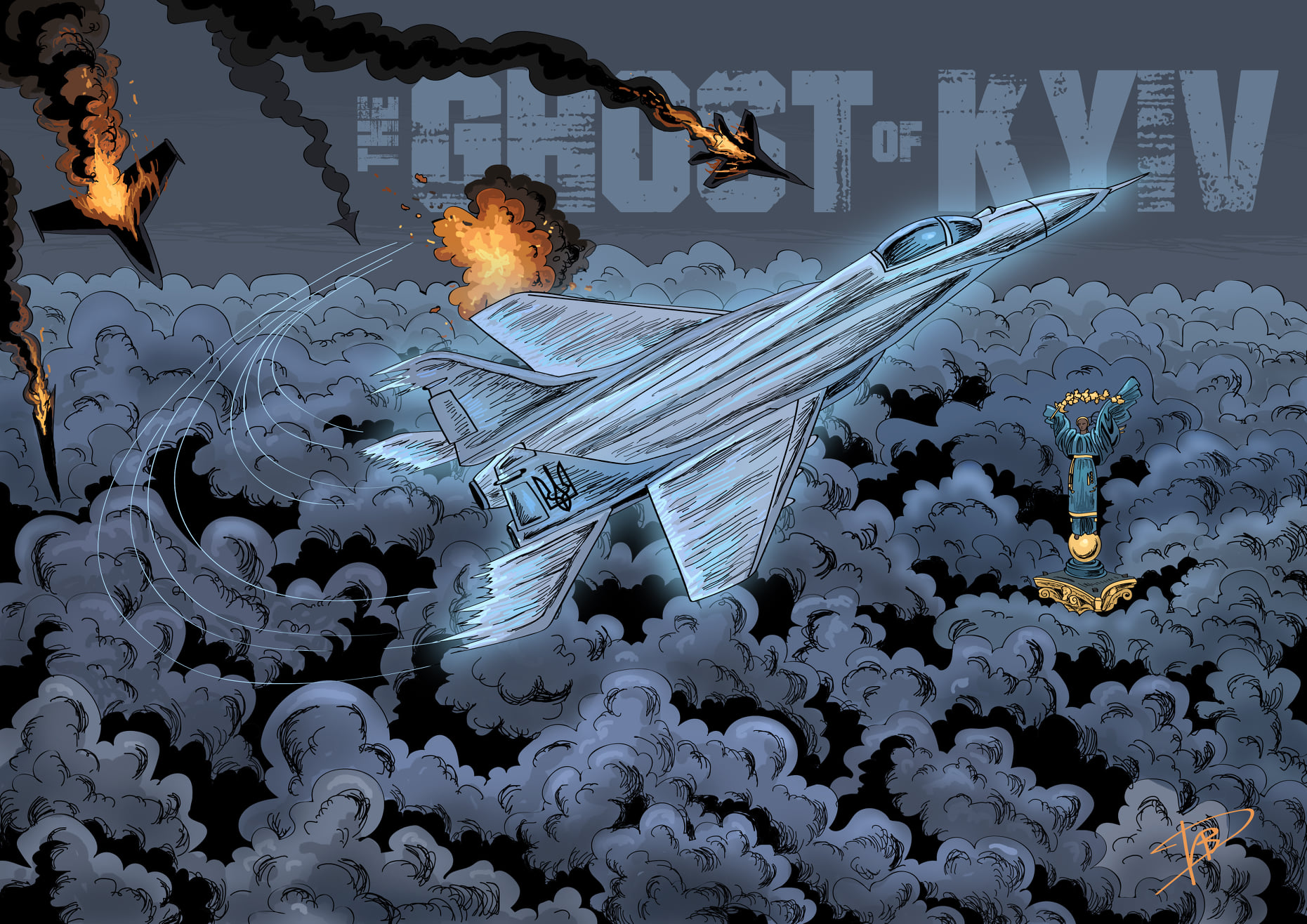
Ghost of Kyiv

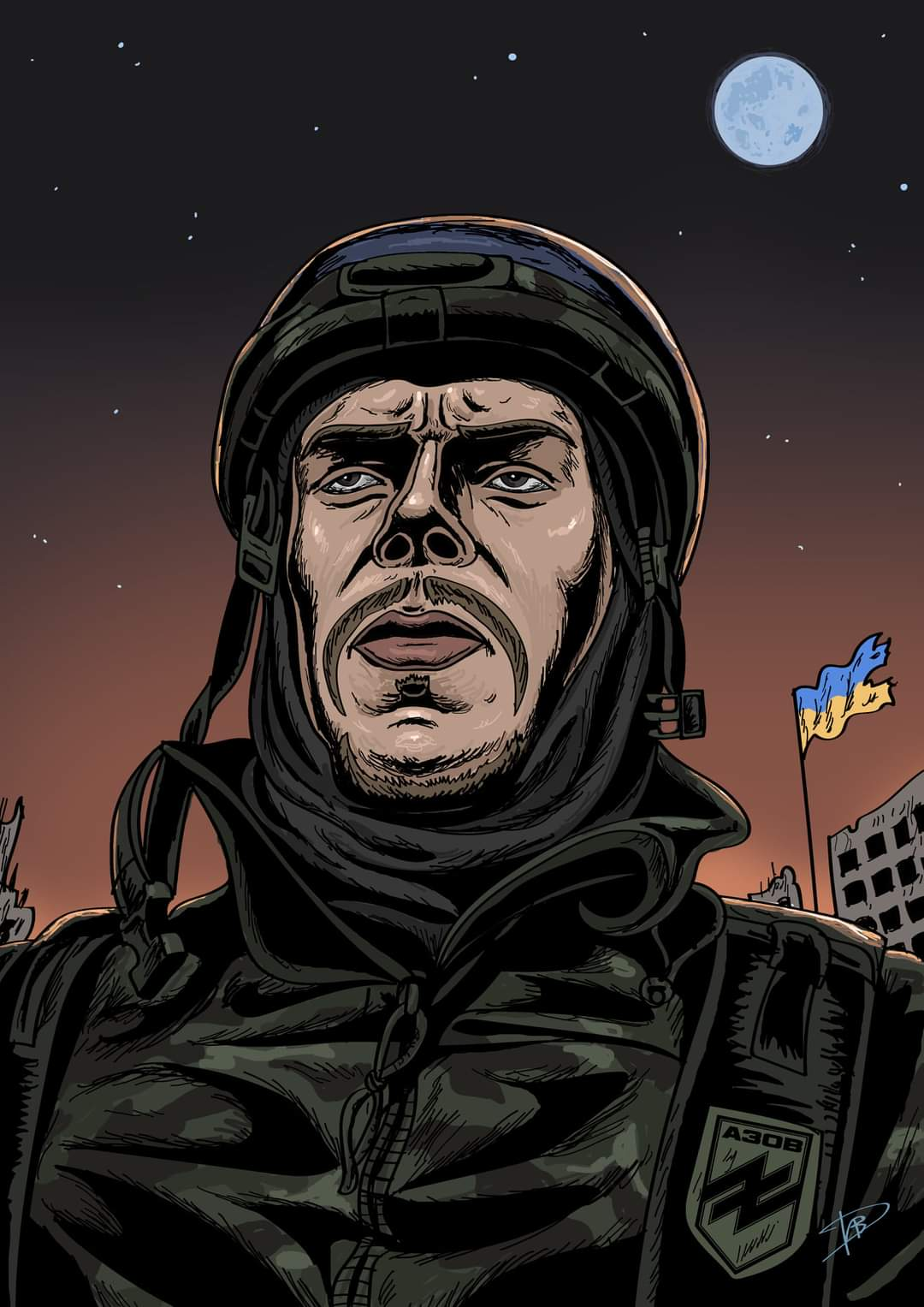
Denys Prokopenko

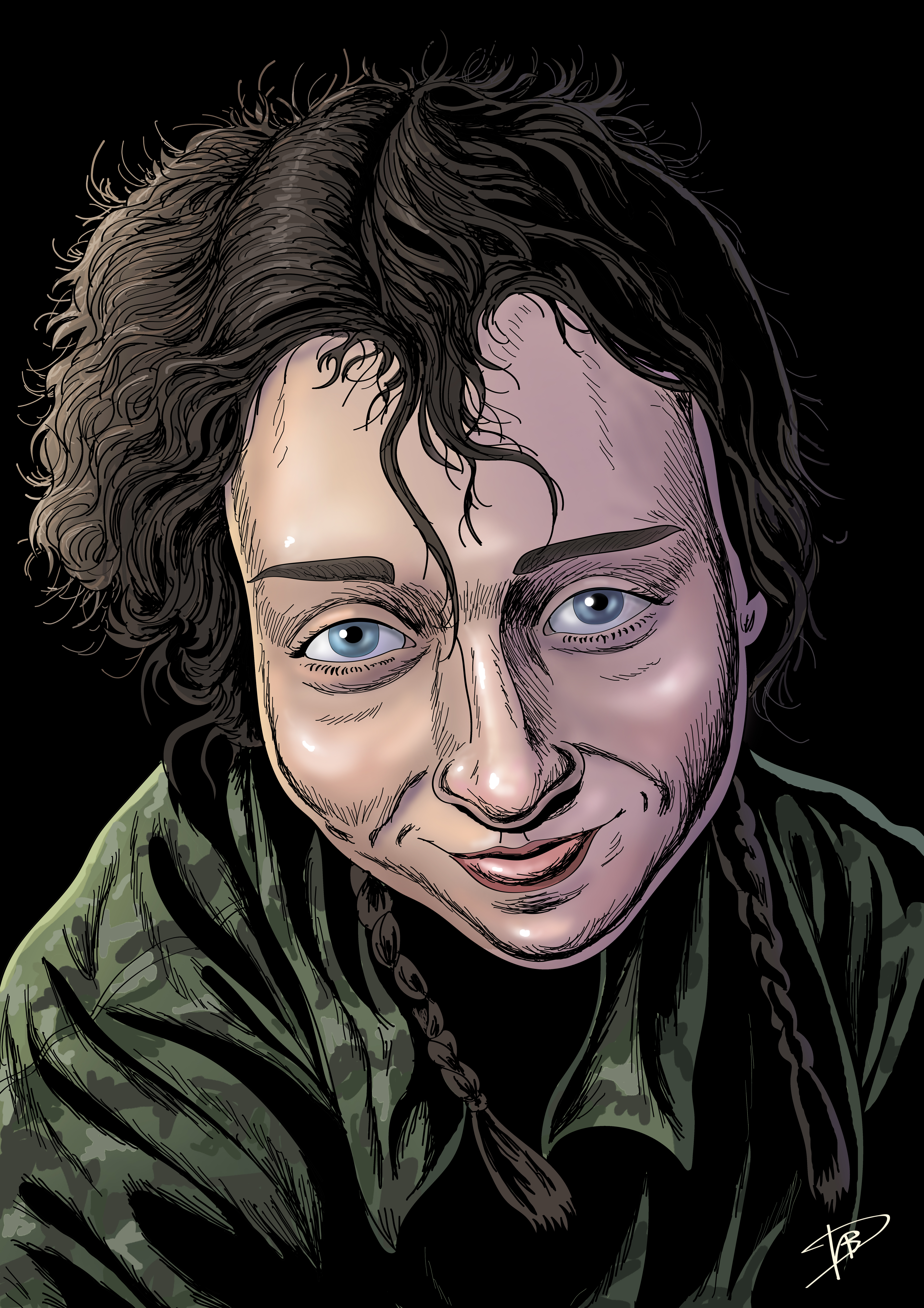
Kateryna Polishchuk ("Birdie")

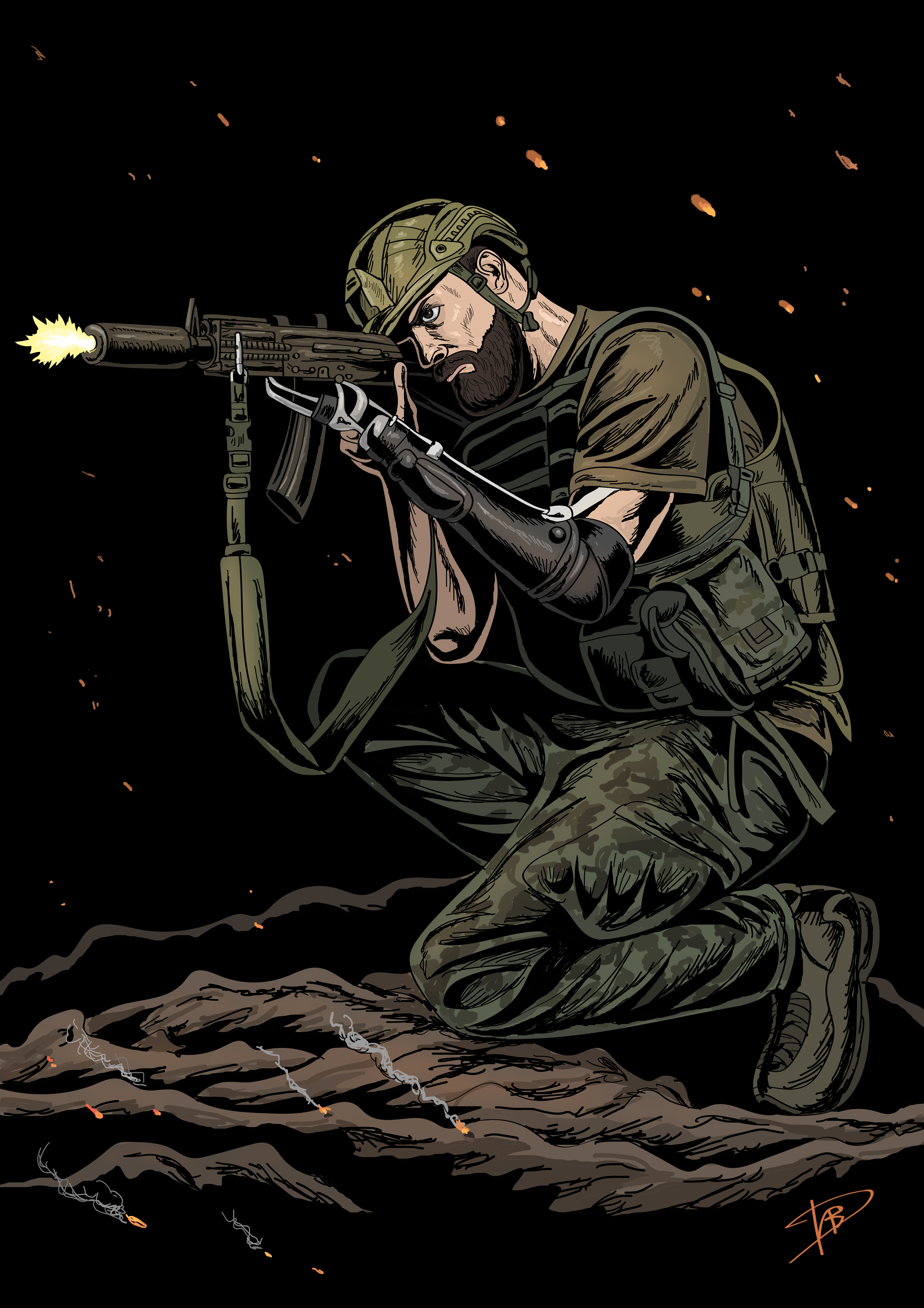
Illiia Samoilenko

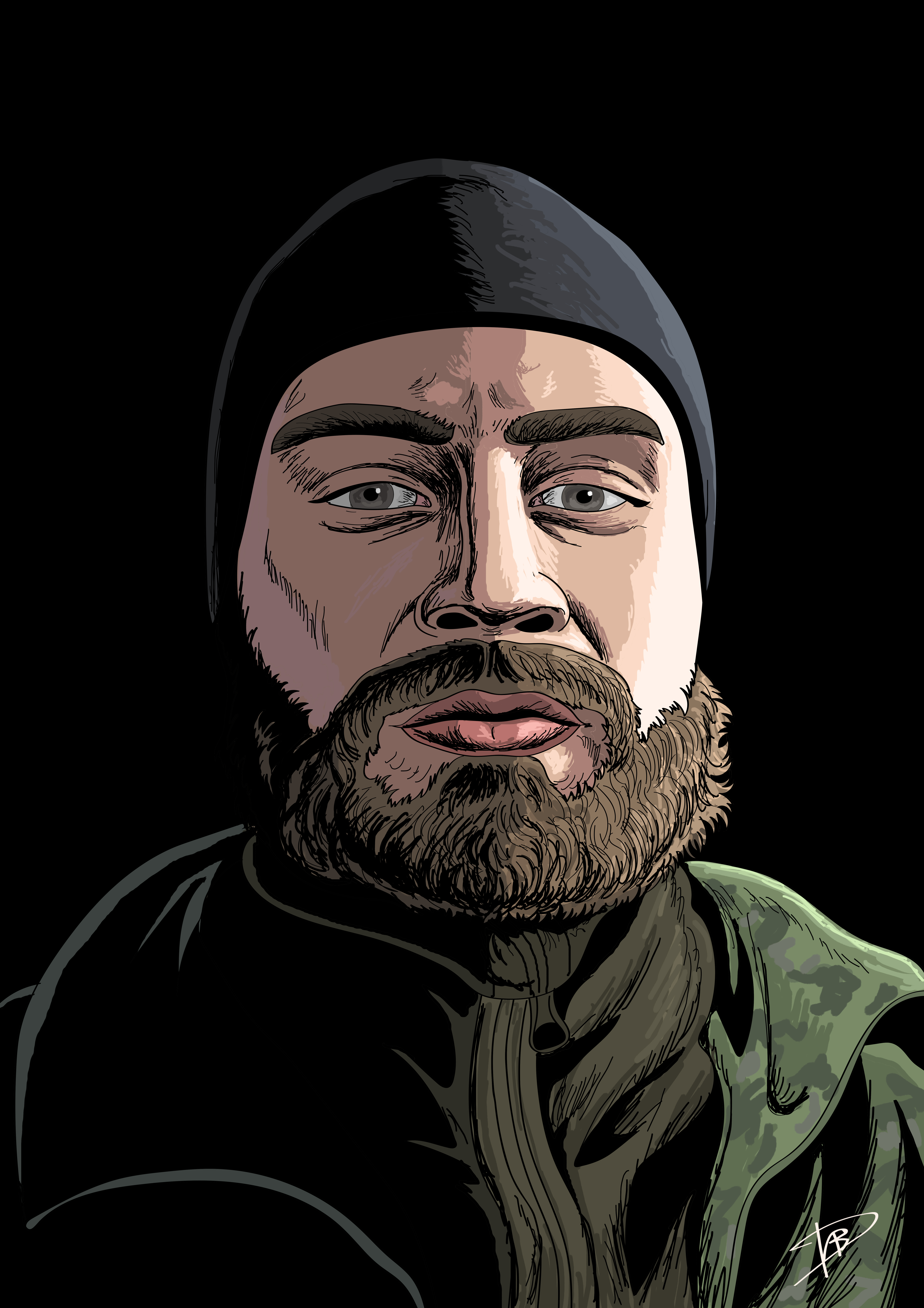
Arsenii Fedosiuk

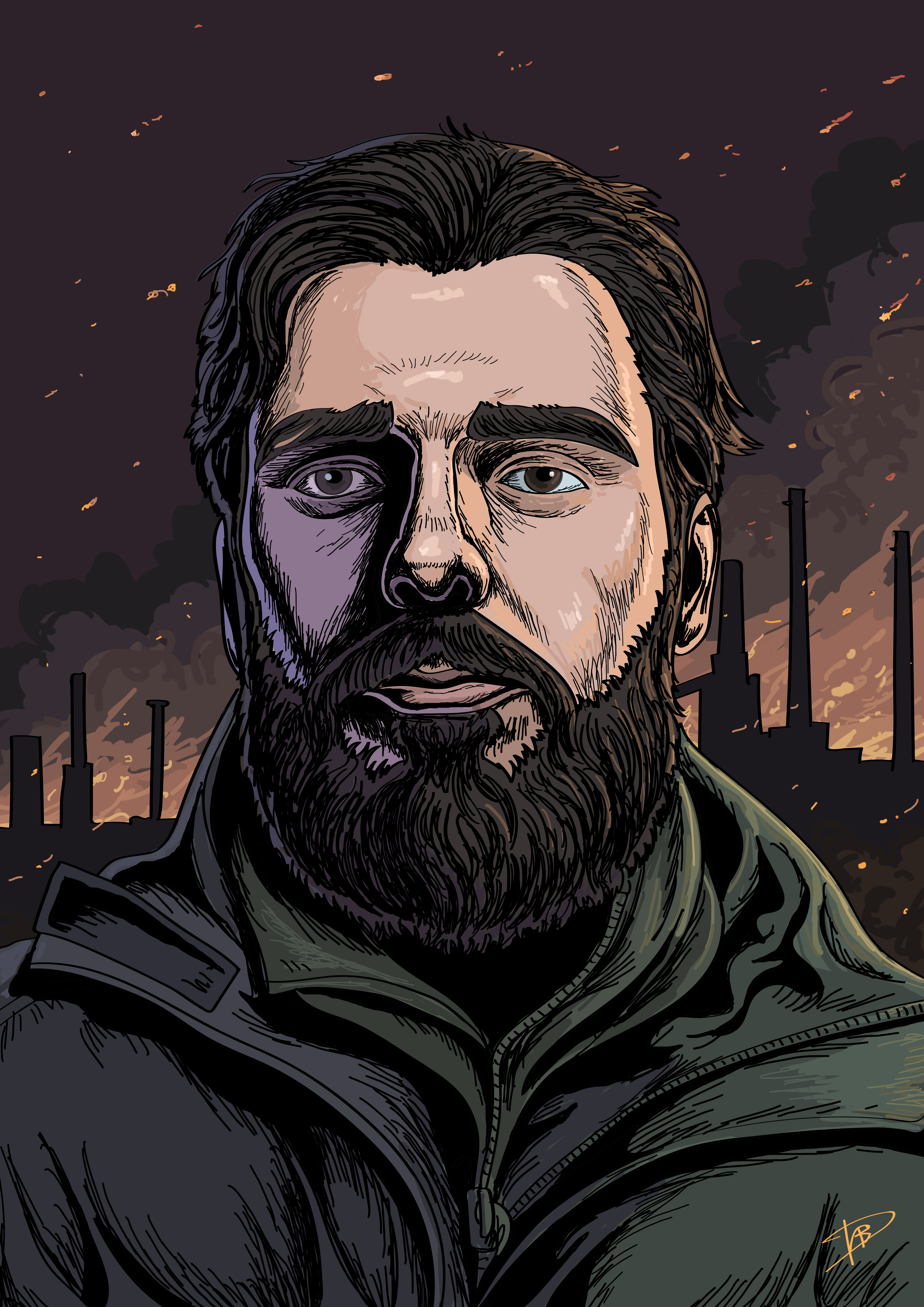
Bohdan Krotevych
