= Kateryna =

Kateryna is a Ukrainian form (transliteration) of Hellenic name Katherine.

It may refer to:

- Kateryna Boloshkevich (1939–2018), Ukrainian weaver and statesperson
- Kateryna Bondarenko (born 1986), professional female tennis player from Ukraine
- Kateryna Grygorenko (born 1985), Ukrainian cross country skier who has competed since 2004
- Kateryna Karsak (born 1985), female discus thrower from Ukraine
- Kateryna Kozlova (born 1994), Ukrainian tennis player
- Kateryna Lahno (born 1989), Ukrainian chess player
- Kateryna Mikhalitsyna (born 1982), Ukrainian poet, children's writer, translator and editor
- Kateryna Palekha (born 1980), athlete from Ukraine
- Kateryna Pavlenko (born 1988), Ukrainian singer, lead singer of Go_A
- Kateryna Polishchuk (born 2001), Ukrainian singer, playwright, and paramedic
- Kateryna Rohonyan (born 1984), female chess grandmaster
- Kateryna Serdyuk (born 1983), Ukrainian archer
- Kateryna Serebrianska (born 1977), Ukrainian former Individual Rhythmic Gymnast
- Kateryna Shershen (born 2010), Ukrainian rhythmic gymnast
- Kateryna Stupnytska (1996–2022), sergeant of the Armed Forces of Ukraine
- Kateryna Tabashnyk (born 1994), Ukrainian high jumper
- Kateryna Yurchenko (born 1976), Ukrainian sprint canoeist who competed in the mid-1990s
- Kateryna Yushchenko (born 1961), former First Lady of Ukraine, second wife of former Ukrainian President Viktor Yushchenko
- Kateryna Zubkova (born 1988), Ukrainian swimmer
