= Alejandro Edda =

American actor (born 1984)

- Born: May 17, 1984 (age 42); Puebla, Mexico
- Citizenship: Mexico; United States
- Education: Meisner Acting Studio
- Occupation: Actor
- Years active: 2007–present
- Known for: Narcos: Mexico
- Spouse: Aura Serna (m. 2009)
- Children: 2

Alejandro Edda (born May 17, 1984) is an American actor, best known for his roles as Marco Rodriguez in the AMC television series Fear the Walking Dead (2016) and Joaquín "El Chapo" Guzmán in the Netflix original series Narcos: Mexico (2018–2021). He also appears in the FX television series Snowfall as a KGB agent called Ruben during seasons 5 and 6. His voice roles in video games include Gustavo in Uncharted 4: A Thief's End, Agent Ricardo "Ricky" Sandoval in Ghost Recon: Wildlands (2017) and Manny in The Last of Us Part II (2020).

He has also appeared in roles for Hollywood films, including Pancho the Cop in the romantic comedy Sundown (2016), Big Jim in Reality High (2017) and Jorge Luis Ochoa Vásquez in American Made (2017).

Edda also appeared in the action horror film The Forever Purge, which was theatrically released in July 2021.

== Early life ==
Edda was born in Puebla, Mexico in 1984. After high school, he studied arts at the Russian Conservatory of Mexico City. At the end of his senior year, he went to join his mother in San Francisco, United States, to pursue an acting career.

He then moved to Los Angeles and studied at the Meisner Acting Studio.

== Career ==
Prior to his acting career, Edda used to be a wine delivery person, but he was fired before being fired from his job as a valet parker as well. Edda started his acting career by appearing in commercials for Domino's Pizza.

After a series of short films, Edda joined the cast of the television series The Bridge in 2013, for eight episodes. The actor continues his American breakthrough by playing supporting roles in other series such as Fear the Walking Dead and Lethal Weapon.

In 2017, he was part of the cast of the film American Made directed by Doug Liman and distributed by Universal Pictures. In this thriller, he plays the role of Jorge Ochoa, a drug trafficker who is the founding member of the Medellín Cartel. This film marks its first box office success.

Edda also appeared as the voice and motion capture of Gustavo in the 2016 PlayStation 4 video game Uncharted 4: A Thief's End, with fellow voice actors Nolan North and Brandon Scott.

In 2018, he appeared in the biopic Cocaine Godmother, which focuses on the drug lord Griselda Blanco, played by Catherine Zeta-Jones. The same year, he appears as Joaquín "El Chapo" Guzmán, leader of the Sinaloa Cartel in the Netflix original series Narcos: Mexico, featuring actors such as Diego Luna and Michael Peña. His character has appeared in the show's third and final season, which has proved to be the show's finale that aired on November 5, 2021, with Bad Bunny joining the show's cast.

He then provided the voice and motion-capture of Manny in the PlayStation 4 video game The Last of Us Part II. Naughty Dog's casting director, Becky Todd, contacted Edda while he was spending Christmas with his grandmother in Mexico, informing him that Neil Druckmann wanted to speak with him; the two spoke on the phone, and Druckmann offered him the role of Manny. Edda, who has little other experience with video games, accepted as he found it to be a unique and creative experience. During production, Druckmann allowed Edda to be creative with his performance, adding small details to the character as he deemed appropriate; for example, Edda felt that Manny would drink mezcal instead of whiskey, as had been suggested in the script, and the line was changed. Manny's design was based on Edda's physical appearance, which added more time to his work on the game; he worked on it for about two years.

He appeared in the role of Trinidad "T.T." Toledo, a Mexican farmhand, in the 2021 action horror film, and the fifth film of The Purge franchise, The Forever Purge, directed by Everardo Gout and starring Ana de la Reguera, Tenoch Huerta (with whom he co-starred in Narcos: Mexico), Josh Lucas, Cassidy Freeman and Will Patton.

In 2024, he was cast as De La Paz in the 2025 film Play Dirty, directed by Shane Black and starring Mark Wahlberg.

== Personal life ==
On July 17, 2009, Edda is married to Aura Serna and currently resides in Los Angeles. He has two sons Luciano Edda (b. March 2009) and Paolo Edda (b. February 2014). He later became a naturalized American citizen.

=== Trial of Joaquín "El Chapo" Guzmán ===
On January 28, 2019, Edda was present at the trial of the real Joaquín "El Chapo" Guzmán when he seized the opportunity to see the real crime lord himself be charged on multiple counts of drug trafficking. The actor's appearance among the witnesses in the eleventh week of the trial happened in Brooklyn Federal Court. According to a CNN news report, Edda states that "it was a rare opportunity". He also says that "what else could be better than to see the man in real life, learn his mannerisms".

== Filmography ==
=== Film ===
Year	Title	Role	Notes
2007	Have Love, Will Travel	Freddy	
2009	Hacia la vida	Salvador	
2009	Wake Up		Short film
2009	Brothers in Blood	Fernando	Short film
2010	Chips and Salsa	Bruno	Short film
2011	Inspector Sanchez	Julio Sanchez	Short film
2013	Adán	Martin	Short film
2013	Maria Bonita	Lampiao	Short film
2013	Enemy Empire	Ongel	
2014	Firecracker		Short film
2014	Internet Dating	Robert	Short film
2016	Sundown	Pancho the Cop	
2017	American Made	Jorge Luis Ochoa Vásquez	
2017	Reality High	Big Jim	
2018	el Bus	Uriel	Short film
2018	Happy New Year Tijuana	Luis	
2018	Perfecto's Dream	Taxista	Short film
2019	The Long Way	Marcos	
2021	COVID-19... Sins and Virtues	Nick	
2021	The Forever Purge	Trinidad "T.T." Toledo	
2021	Daughters of Witches	Danny	Short film
2022	Blind Trust	Alex	
2023	Good Savage	Fernando	
2024	Horizon: An American Saga – Chapter 1	Neron Chavez	
2025	Play Dirty	De La Paz	
2026	Ha-Chan, Shake Your Booty!	Luis	

=== Television ===
Year	Title	Role	Notes
2013–2014	The Bridge	Alejandro / Juárez Cop	8 episodes
2016	Fear the Walking Dead	Marco Rodriguez	4 episodes
2016	Lethal Weapon	Luis Caldera	Episode: "Fashion Police"
2017	Chance	Captain	Episodes: "An Infant, A Brute or a Wild Beast" and "A Madness of Two"
2018	Cocaine Godmother	Rodolfo "Rudi"	Television movie
2018–2021	Narcos: Mexico	Joaquín "El Chapo" Guzmán	Main cast 30 episodes
2019–2022	DreamWorks Dragons: Rescue Riders	Cindel (voice)	Recurring cast
2020	Popternative	Himself	Episode: "Alejandro Edda"
2021–2023	Hooves Forward	Felipe the Campolina Horse (voice)	Recurring cast
2022–2023	Snowfall	Ruben	15 episodes Recurring (season 5); Main cast (season 6)
2022–2023	National Treasure: Edge of History	Rafael Rios	Recurring cast
2023	Captain Fall	Pedro (voice)	Main cast
2023	The Chosen One	Principal Hernandez	3 episodes
TBA	El Gato	TBA	In production

=== Video games ===
Year	Title	Role	Notes
2016	Uncharted 4: A Thief's End	Gustavo	Voice and motion capture
2017	Ghost Recon: Wildlands	Agent Ricky Sandoval (voice)	
2020	The Last of Us Part II	Emanuel "Manny" Alvarez	Voice and motion capture
