= Comic Con Ukraine =

Fan convention in Ukraine

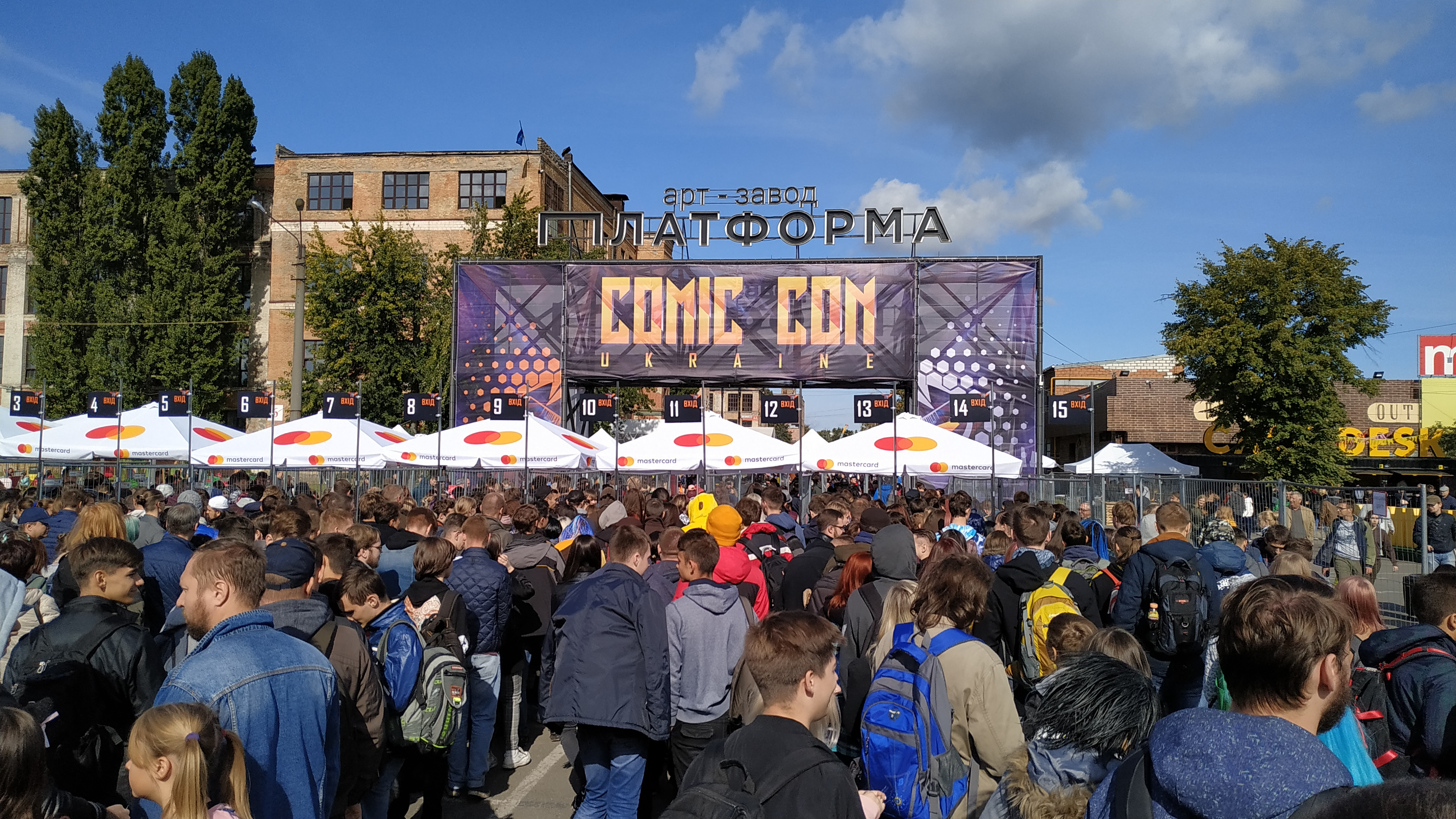
- Entrance at «CCU2019»
- Status: active
- Genre: speculative fiction, multi-genre
- Frequency: Annually
- Venue: Art Factory «Platform»
- Location: Kyiv
- Coordinates: 50.460620°N 30.640219°E
- Country: Ukraine
- Inaugurated: September 22, 2018; 8 years ago
- Most recent: September 4–5, 2021
- Organiser: List: Arkadii Medvediev; Artem Priadka; Oleksandr Tupkalo
- Sponsors: List: Lenovo; Acer; Predator Gaming UA; Ulichnaya Eda (Фудкорт); Arthammer LARP Workshop; PlayUA; 3ona 51; Фестиваль косплею «ОТОБЕ»; Ukrainian Wrestling Zone: UWZ; Київський Фестиваль Коміксів (Kyiv Comics Festival); Ігровий бар «Respawn»; Інформативний ресурс «Black Lion»; K-POP World Festival; Warner Bros; B&H Film Distribution Company; Ukrainian Film Distribution; Планета Кіно (network of cinemas); Ubisoft; Wargaming; eForb games; The Gaming; FINT Academy; Cougar; DX Racer; Razer; Wacom; Hobby World; NYX; Revo; Happy Paw; Karabas; ТМ Seth & Riley's Garage
- Website: comiccon.ua

Comic Con Ukraine (abbreviated CCU) is a speculative fiction entertainment annual exhibition and fan convention of computer and video games, TV series and comic movies in Ukraine. The first convention was held alongside the Art Factory «Platform» in 2018.

From the beginning the showcasing primarily comic books and science fiction/fantasy related film, television, and similar popular arts, the convention includes a larger range of pop culture and entertainment elements across virtually all genres, including horror, animation, anime, manga, toys, collectible card games, video games, webcomics, and fantasy novels in the country.

== History ==
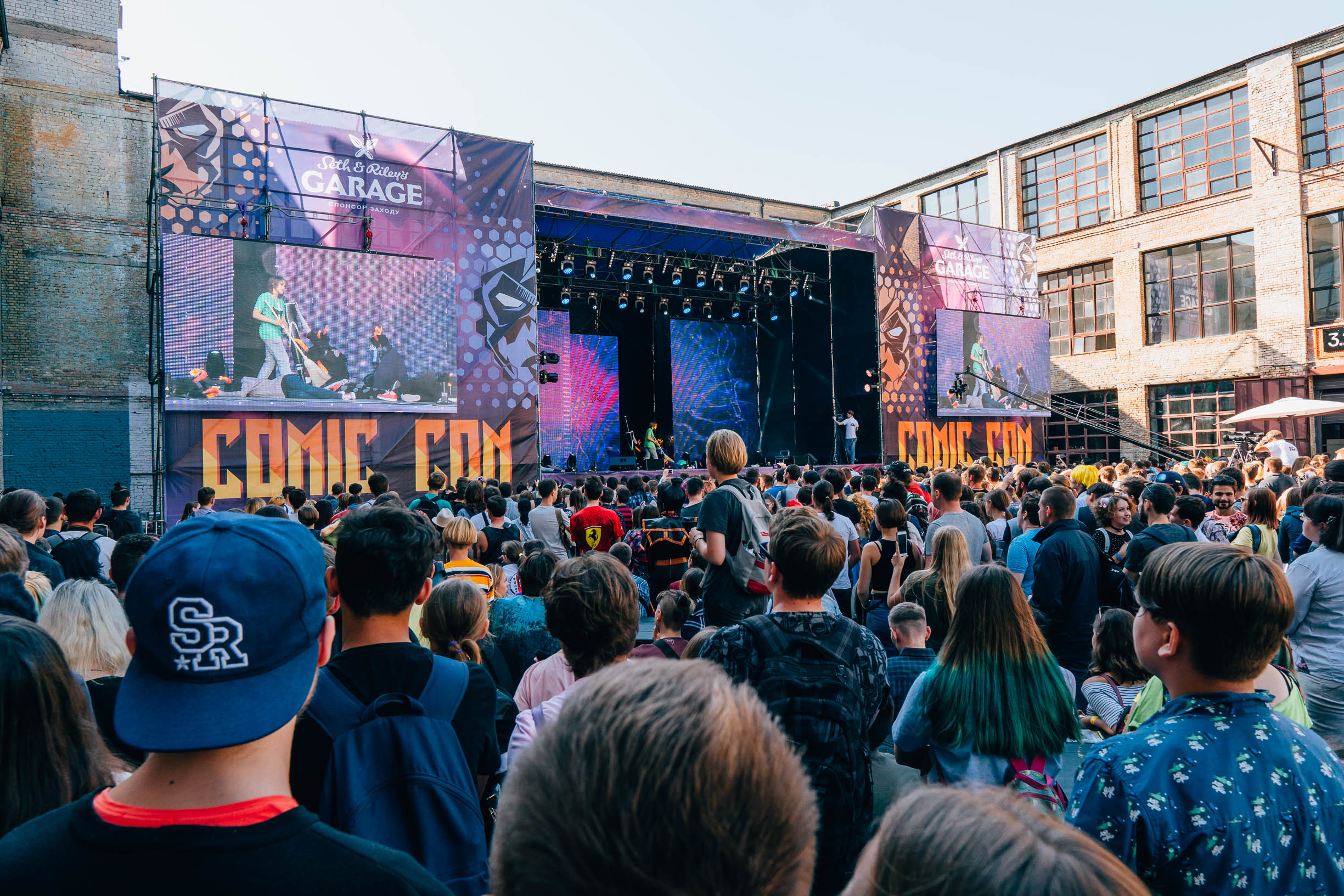
Main Stage of «CCU2018»

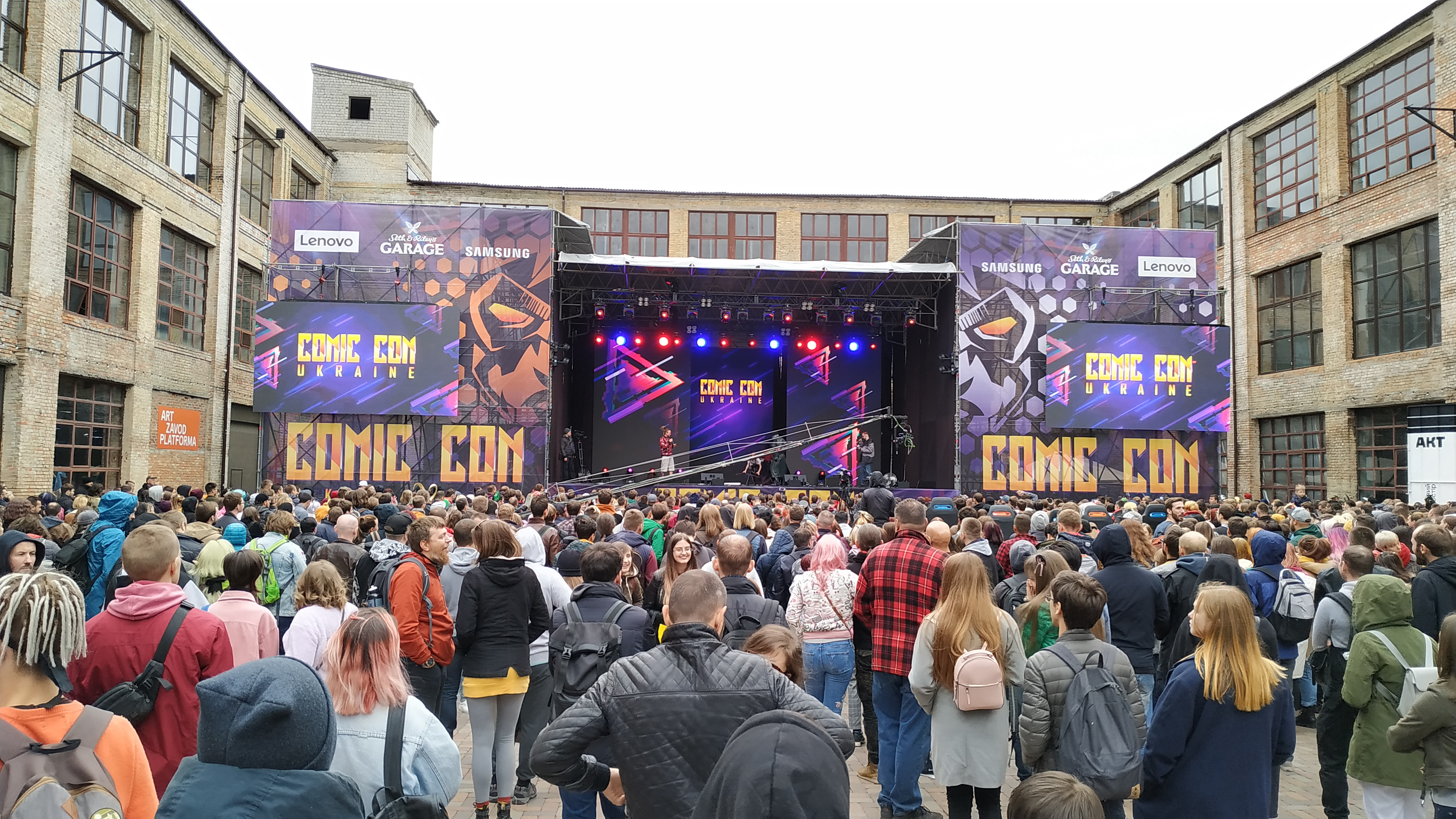
Main Stage of «CCU2019»

=== 2018 ===
The convention was held on September 22–23, with more than 20,000 visitors, which made the festival the largest in Ukraine. Star guests was John Rhys-Davies, Bryan Dechart and Amelia Rose Blaire.

=== 2019 ===
The convention was held on September 21–22, with more than 30,000 visitors, which made him the most visited Comic Con in Eastern Europe. Foreign guests of the festival was John Romero, Danny Trejo and Christopher Lloyd. A separate model museum of the Star Wars franchise from the "Yavin" (Poland) design team was reopened at the festival. Germany's "Project X1" team has brought a realistic model of the T-65 X-Wing star fighter from the Star Wars franchise. The length of the model is 34 feet, weight - 2.3 tons, it has the autographs of many artists. There were 14 bands performing on the main stage, including the American Magic Sword. A lot of Ukrainian comic book publishers participated in the festival. 44 future Ukrainian editions of localized and copyrighted comics have been announced, as well as the first artbooks for video games in Ukrainian; Sales for more than 30 new comics have been launched.

== Locations and dates ==
No.	Year (Note: Which is also a subtitle.)	Dates	Location	Area (m^{2})	Attendance	Guests
1	2018	Sep 22–23	Art Factory «Platform»	20 000	20 000+	John Rhys-Davies, Bryan Dechart and Amelia Rose Blaire
2	2019	Sep 21–22	Art Factory «Platform»	30 000	30 000+	John Romero, Danny Trejo and Christopher Lloyd
3	2020	Sep 05–06	Art Factory «Platform»	Not held due to the COVID-19 pandemic in Ukraine		
4	2021	Sep 04–05	Art Factory «Platform»	30 000	40 000+	Mark Dacascos, Natalia Tena, Anna Shaffer and Helena Mankowska
5	2022	Sep 03-04	Art Factory «Platform»	Not held due to the Russian invasion of Ukraine		
6	2023		Art Factory «Platform»	Not held due to the Russian invasion of Ukraine		

== See also ==
- East European Comic Con
- Comic Con
