= Sundown (2016 film) =

2016 American film directed by Fernando Lebrija

- Film poster
- Directed by: Fernando Lebrija
- Written by: Fernando Lebrija; Miguel Tejada-Flores
- Produced by: Andy Boggeri; Sandro Halphen; Willie Kutner; Fernando Lebrija; Pablo Lebrija; Leonardo Zimbrón
- Starring: Devon Werkheiser; Sean Marquette; Camilla Belle
- Cinematography: Gerardo Madrazo; Pietro Zuercher
- Edited by: Craig Herring; Radu Ion
- Music by: Edward Rogers
- Production company: Irreversible Cinema
- Distributed by: Pantelion Films
- Release dates: April 22, 2016 (Mexico); May 13, 2016 (United States)
- Running time: 103 minutes
- Countries: United States; Mexico
- Language: English

Sundown is a 2016 Mexican-American comedy film directed by Fernando Lebrija and starring Devon Werkheiser.

== Plot ==
Logan is a high school senior who dreams of being a DJ, much to the chagrin of his parents who want him to study at a good college. His friend Blake coaxes Logan to get the attention of a girl, Lina, who talks about going to Puerto Vallarta in Mexico. Logan is grounded for taking his Dad's Porsche out without permission to impress Lina, and is ordered to pick up his grandfather's Rolex watch, while his parents go on a cruise.

Unbeknownst to his parents, Logan flies to Mexico with Blake. Chuy, a cab driver, befriends them and provides them with accommodation when their hotel reservation is turns out to be a scam. When they go clubbing, Logan attempts to flirt with a drunken Lina, who vomits in his mouth as they kiss. Logan calls Chuy to take Lina back to the hotel and they meet a Mexican girl, Gaby, who shares his taste in music and gives the Club DJ a USB drive of Logan's labeled "DJ Phantom". Blake gets together with Mona, a girl participating in a wet t-shirt contest and Logan takes Jessica to a room.

The next morning, Blake is shocked that Mona is actually a trans woman, and leaves in a hurry. Logan wakes in a daze to Gaby leaving and asks Logan for $300 for spending the night, and Logan realizes that his Rolex watch is missing. Chuy drives Logan and Blake to a strip club where Gaby is dancing and give her $300 for the watch, but she says that it's in the possession of her manager, Dorian. When they go to see Dorian, he demands $5000 within 24 hours in exchange for the watch. Gaby, regretting her actions, decides to help Logan. Chuy, having a disdain for Dorian, also agrees to help and suggests they make money by gambling on Cockfighting, which proves lucky and they win $5000. As Blake and Chuy go off to celebrate getting the money, Gaby says she's an orphan whose real name is Jessica who began working for Dorian to care for her ailing grandfather and confesses to using Rohypnol on her clients, including Logan.

The next day, Logan, Blake and Chuy go on a boat to an island to meet with Dorian. Dorian, however, drugs them and they wake up in a car reported stolen, naked and next to the police station. They drive away with cops in pursuit, but manage to escape. Logan and Blake having a falling out with Logan calling Blake selfish and Blake calling Logan spineless. They return to the hotel defeated until Jessica comes up with a plan to steal Dorian's dog, which is then used as a hostage in return for the Rolex watch. Logan and Blake reconcile. At the exchange, Dorian is pressured to agree to the deal when Chuy brings backup in the form of his "cousins", but says he cannot give up Jessica, so Logan offers his Rolex watch as a price for Jessica's freedom. Logan gives the $5000 to Chuy and his cousins for their help. Logan proceeds to turn down Lina, instead suggesting she go after Blake. Jessica convinces the DJ to allow Logan to perform. Logan's nervousness causes a slight mishap, but he eventually recovers and wins the crowd over with his mix.

As they say their goodbyes, Jessica leaves abruptly and drives off in tears. Logan flies to America with Blake, heartbroken.

Logan's parents return home, and he tells his father about losing the Rolex watch. The dad admits that it was actually he lost the original grandfather's watch many years ago, and that the present one was only a replacement. Logan convinces his parents to let him take a year off to pursue music.

While bartending at a club in Mexico, Jessica hears the name "DJ Phantom" being announced. She turns up to see Logan and they reunite and dance to the music.

== Cast ==
- Devon Werkheiser as Logan
- Sean Marquette as Blake
- Camilla Belle as Gaby / Jessica
- Silverio Palacios as Chuy
- Jordi Mollà as Dorian
- Sara Paxton as Lina Hunter
- Teri Hatcher as Janice
- John Michael Higgins as Kent
- Reid Ewing as Eugene
- Alejandro Edda as Pancho the Cop

== Reception ==
The film received mostly negative reviews from the few critics who saw the film. It currently has a 9% rating on Rotten Tomatoes. Brian Orndorf from Blu-ray.com wrote a negative review, claiming: "Lebrija wants to make a heartfelt statement on love and passion, but he's picked the wrong subgenre to express his sincerity, leaving "Sundown" uneven and eventually out of gas." Aaron Peterson from The Hollywood Outsider gave the film a positive review, stating: "[Sundown] is a playful film with a strong cast and a bombastic soundtrack. It might not be the best Spring Break comedy ever, but this is a party you don't want to miss."
