= Firewall Ultra =

2023 video game

- Developer: First Contact Entertainment
- Publisher: Sony Interactive Entertainment
- Engine: Unreal Engine 5
- Platform: PlayStation 5
- Release: August 24, 2023
- Genre: First-person shooter
- Modes: Single-player, multiplayer

Firewall Ultra was a 2023 first-person shooter developed by First Contact Entertainment and published by Sony Interactive Entertainment. A sequel to Firewall: Zero Hour (2018), it was released on August 24, 2023, for the PlayStation VR2, a virtual reality device.

== Gameplay ==
Firewall Ultra is a VR first-person shooter developed for the PlayStation VR2. It utilizes the PSVR2's eye-tracking technology to provide aim assist and allows players to temporarily blind opponents using a flashlight or flashbang grenades.

The main multiplayer mode, Contracts, is a 4v4 objective-based mode in which one team defends a access point while the attacking team attempts to capture it. The game also includes a cooperative PvE mode called Exfil, where up to four players must work together to hold three control points while fending off increasingly difficult waves of enemies controlled by artificial intelligence. Between missions, players can customize their playable characters (named Contractors), each of whom has their own unique perks and abilities.

== Development ==
The game was revealed in September 2022. It was one of the earliest virtual reality games to use Unreal Engine 5. The game was released on August 24, 2023. Players who pre-ordered the game received a unique weapon, while those who purchased the Digital Deluxe Edition can access additional cosmetic items as well as early unlock of several playable characters.

Developer First Contact Entertainment was shut down in December 2023. In an official statement, the studio cited "the lack of support for VR within the industry" as the primary reason, adding that the team were unable to "justify the expense needed going forward" as a AAA VR game developer.

In March 2026, the game was delisted from the PlayStation Store and it was announced it will be shut down on September 17.

== Reception ==
Reception

Aggregate score
Aggregator	Score
Metacritic	62/100

Review scores
Publication	Score
IGN	6/10
Push Square	5/10

The game received "mixed or average" reviews according to review aggregator Metacritic.

Gabriel Moss from IGN felt that the game "simultaneously feels like two steps forward and two steps backward", praising its gunplay and its emphasis on teamwork and tactics, while criticizing its nauseating controls and lack of content. He summarized his review by saying that Firewall Ultra was "a decent competitive multiplayer shooter that just happens to be in VR, but its awkward controls are a shot in the foot rather than the shot in the arm that the PlayStation VR2 desperately needed". Aaron Bayne from Push Square wrote that the game was a "an infrequently fun yet persistently disappointing first-party title that really forgets what makes VR so special in the first place". While he praised the game's visual and lighting systems, he criticized its lack of physical interactivity and motion controls for breaking players' immersion, ultimately describing the game as "a VR game made for people that don't play VR".
