= Illia Samoilenko (officer) =

Ukrainian soldier (born 1994)

- Ілля Самойленко
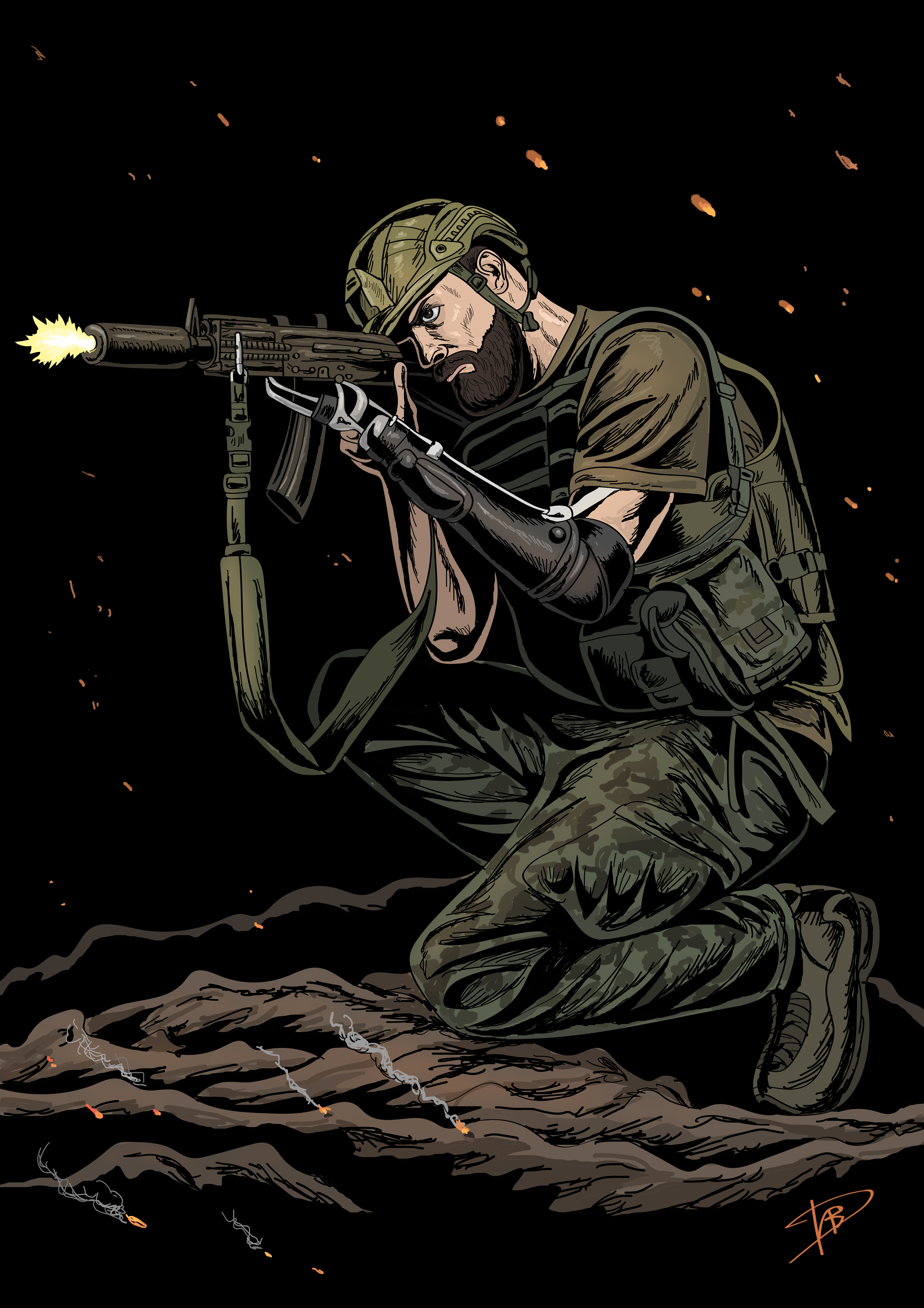
- Illia Samoilenko, author Andrii Dankovych

Personal details
- Born: July 10, 1994 (age 31)
- Education: Taras Shevchenko National University of Kyiv
- Nickname: Gandalf

Military service
- Allegiance: Ukraine
- Branch/service: Ministry of Internal Affairs; National Guard; Azov Brigade
- Battles/wars: Russo-Ukrainian War; War in Donbas; Russian invasion of Ukraine; Eastern Ukraine offensive; Siege of Mariupol

Illia Samoilenko (Ukrainian: Ілля Сергійович Самойленко; born 10 July 1994) is a Ukrainian serviceman, an intelligence officer of the Azov Regiment of the National Guard of Ukraine, and a participant in the Russian-Ukrainian war.

== Biography ==
Samoilenko studied at the Faculty of History of the Taras Shevchenko National University of Kyiv. He dreams of completing his studies after the war. His callsign is Gandalf.

In 2015, he began military service in the ATO/OOS zone as part of the Azov Regiment when he was 21 years old. He lost his left arm and right eye during the fighting (he now has a titanium mechanical prosthesis and an artificial eye).

Since the beginning of the blockade of Mariupol, he and his colleagues were in the Azovstal iron and steel works. From the basement of the plant, Samoilenko gave several news updates. On May 8, 2022, he held a press conference for representatives of foreign media in English.

He was captured on May 20, 2022. In an interview to the BBC he said that he was held in solitary confinement in Russia for 120 days.

On September 21, 2022, he was released from captivity.

== Sources ==
- Harrowing photos offer rare glimpse of wounded soldiers in besieged Mariupol steel plant // Today.
- Inside Mariupol steel plant as army chief describes horror of being bombed for 73 days // Mirror.
- Яна Осадца, Замість руки — титановий протез: цікаві факти про Іллю Самойленка з «Азова» // Українська правда, May 9, 2022
- Герої серед нас: Ілля Самойленко з «Азову» має титановий механічний протез замість лівої руки // Укрінформ, May 9, 2022
- Єлизавета Герасимюк, Тяжке поранення — не привід зупинятися: неймовірна історія бійця «Азову» // 24 канал, September 6, 2019
