= Firewall: Zero Hour =

2018 video game

- Box art
- Developer: First Contact Entertainment
- Publisher: Sony Interactive Entertainment
- Engine: Unreal Engine
- Platform: PlayStation 4
- Release: August 28, 2018
- Genre: First-person shooter
- Mode: Multiplayer

Firewall: Zero Hour is a virtual reality first-person shooter game developed by First Contact Entertainment and published by Sony Interactive Entertainment. It was released for the PlayStation 4 via the PlayStation VR on August 28, 2018. A sequel, Firewall Ultra, was announced in September 2022 for the PlayStation VR2.

== Gameplay ==
Firewall: Zero Hour is an online, or offline via training, virtual reality tactical action shooter where players called contractors take on contracts issued from agents who are known as mother and father. Each contractor has a different passive skill for use on the field which can help support the player fend off the enemy team from completing their objective. There are 12 contractors players can choose from all with a set primary skill and a secondary skill you can edit. Weapon loadouts are also customizable where players can pick a primary weapon, secondary weapon, one lethal equipment and one nonlethal equipment. Taking on contracts players will receive experience for certain actions they complete, as well as earning in-game currency known as "Crypto" where both can be found scattered around the map or completing the contract.

=== Training ===
Players can practice their tactics against AI enemies that scale with rank either solo, or in a 4-player squad which either can be private or public matchmaking.

=== Contracts ===
In this mode players are against other players formed into two teams of four in which the attacking team will have two objectives to complete in order to fulfill their contract. Attacking team "Mother" would have to first break a firewall in a location hidden from their wristband until a team member comes in contact with one then secondly hack a laptop in order to fulfill their contract earning experience points and crypto. Defending team "Father" can either move to the firewalls and defend or defend their main objective laptop.

== Development ==
The game was announced during PSX 2017 at the Anaheim Convention Center.

== Reception ==
Reception

Aggregate score
Aggregator	Score
Metacritic	79/100

Review scores
Publication	Score
Electronic Gaming Monthly	3/5
Eurogamer	Recommended
Push Square	6/10

Initial reviews for Firewall: Zero Hour were positive and the game was praised as being a major step forward for virtual reality gaming.

=== Accolades ===
Year	Award	Category	Result	Ref.
2018	Golden Joystick Awards	Best Co-operative Game	Nominated	
2018	Golden Joystick Awards	Best VR Game	Nominated	
2018	The Game Awards 2018	Best VR/AR Game	Nominated	
2019	New York Game Awards	Coney Island Dreamland Award for Best Virtual Reality Game	Nominated	
2019	National Academy of Video Game Trade Reviewers Awards	Control Design, VR	Nominated	
2019	National Academy of Video Game Trade Reviewers Awards	Direction in Virtual Reality	Nominated	
2019	National Academy of Video Game Trade Reviewers Awards	Sound Mixing in Virtual Reality	Nominated	
2019	The Independent Game Developers' Association Awards	Best Social Game	Nominated	

== See also ==
- List of PlayStation VR games
