= Amelia Rose Blaire =

American actress

Amelia Rose Blaire Dechart
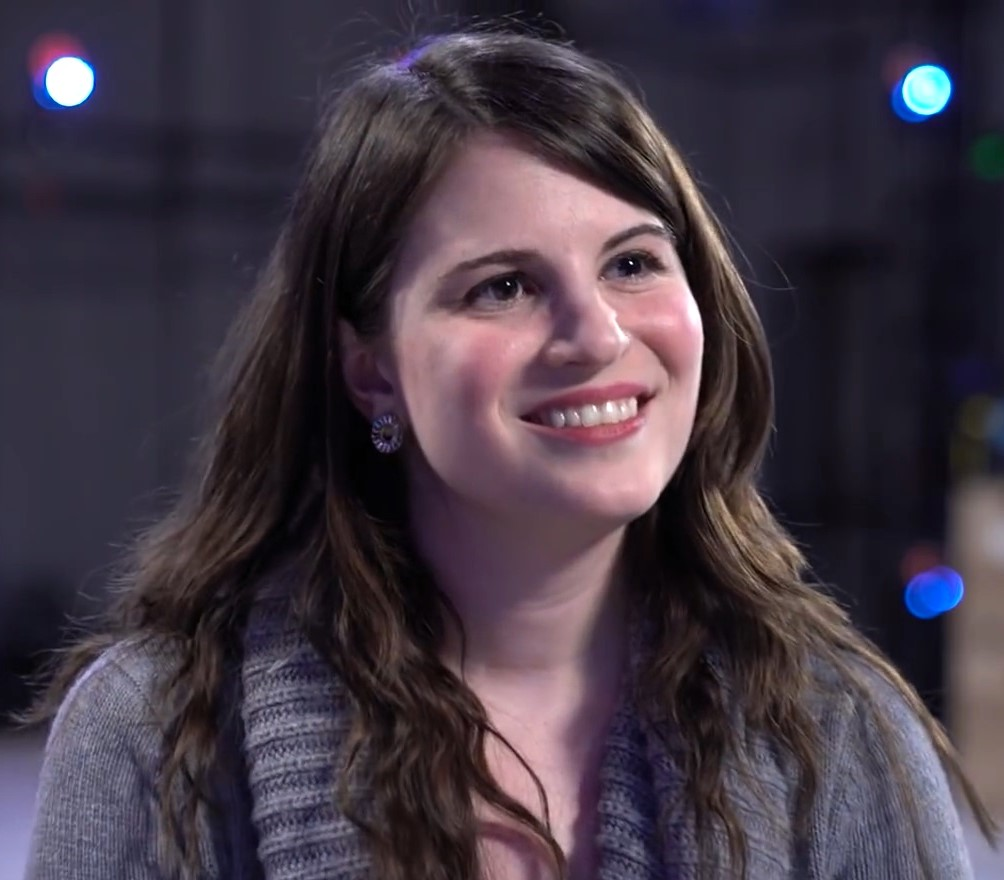
- Blaire in 2020
- Born: New York City
- Education: The Sanford Meisner Center for the Arts
- Occupation: Actress
- Years active: 2002, 2010–present
- Spouse: Bryan Dechart (m. 2018)
- Children: 1

Amelia Rose Blaire Dechart is an American actress (November 20, 1987). She is known for her roles as Willa Burrell on the HBO series True Blood, portraying the Tracis in the game Detroit: Become Human, and Piper Shaw on the MTV series Scream.

== Career ==
Blaire studied acting at age 15 when she first started classes at The Sanford Meisner Center for the Arts in Los Angeles, California. After a summer studying Shakespeare with the British American Drama Academy in London, she began working with Oscar-nominated actress Lindsay Crouse, who directed her towards the Atlantic Theater Company's two-year conservatory program in New York City. After graduating, she completed Atlantic's LA Program of master classes with David Mamet, Felicity Huffman, Clark Gregg and others. On August 23, 2013, it was announced that she had been promoted to a series regular on the HBO television series, True Blood.

On April 22, 2015, it was announced that Blaire joined in a recurring role as Piper Shaw in the first season of MTV's Scream.

== Personal life ==
Blaire was born in New York City and raised in Los Angeles. In June 2017, Blaire announced her engagement to actor Bryan Dechart on Twitter. They married on June 30, 2018. She and her husband regularly stream video games on Twitch under the brand Dechart Games. On New Year’s Eve 2023, the couple announced they were expecting their first child on their Twitch stream.

== Filmography ==
=== Film ===
Year	Title	Role	Notes
2011	Blown Away	Hot Girl	Short film
2012	Sitter Wars	Ariel	Short film
2012	Commencement	Christa Richmond	
2013	This Is Where We Go	Annie	Short film
2013	The Colony	Shelby Baker	Short film
2015	Caught	Paige	
2017	Echelon	Cyra	Short film
2018	Angels in Stardust	Loretta	
2018	You'll Only Have Each Other	Maggie	Short film

=== Television ===
Year	Title	Role	Notes
2002	Strong Medicine	Jane Kellher	Episode: "Flesh and Blood"
2010	Drop Dead Diva	Abbey Tildon	Episode: "Bad Girls"
2010	90210	Laura Mathison	4 episodes
2011	The Protector	Bridget	Episode: "Beef"
2011	Grimm	Sarah Jessup	Episode: "Danse Macabre"
2012	Touch	Natalie	Episode: "Noosphere Rising"
2012	The Glades	Brooke Hudson	Episode: "Poseidon Adventure"
2012	Perception	Annie	Episode: "Kilimanjaro"
2012	Royal Pains	Fiona	Episode: "Hurts Like a Mother"
2013	Law & Order: Special Victims Unit	Nicole Price	Episode: "Wonderland Story"
2013–14	True Blood	Willa Burrell	19 episodes
2014	The Mentalist	Bibby Fortensky	Episode: "Black Market"
2015	Grey's Anatomy	Hillary List	Episode: "The Great Pretender"
2015	Blue Bloods	Sarah Grant	Episode: "Bad Company"
2015–16	Scream	Piper Shaw	12 episodes
2015	Jesse Stone: Lost in Paradise	Amelia "Charlotte" Hope	Television film
2016	Criminal Minds	Violet	Episode: "Hostage"

=== Web ===
Year	Title	Role	Notes
2019	L.A. by Night	Suzanne Rochelle	4 episodes

=== Video games ===
Year	Title	Role	Notes
2016	Quantum Break	Amy Ferraro	Also motion capture
2018	Detroit: Become Human	Traci	Also motion capture
2020	Cyberpunk 2077	Theo, Additional Voices	
2026	God of War Sons of Sparta	Eleonora	
TBA	Lunafon: Tales of the Moon Oak	The Pirate Queen	

=== Music videos ===
Year	Title	Artist
2018	"Trouble Man"	Chris Pierce

== Awards ==
Year	Award	Category	Result	Ref
2015	TV Guide Awards	Best Villain (Scream)	Won	
2018	Golden Joystick Awards	Best New Streamer/Broadcaster (shared with Bryan Dechart)	Won	
