= Detroit: Become Human =

2018 video game

- Cover art featuring Markus, one of the playable characters
- Developer: Quantic Dream
- Publisher: Sony Interactive Entertainment (Note: Windows version self-published by Quantic Dream)
- Director: David Cage
- Producer: Sophie Buhl
- Designer: Simon Wasselin
- Programmer: Jean-Charles Perrier
- Writers: David Cage; Adam Williams (Note: While initially credited as a lead writer in interviews, Williams was attributed with "additional writing" in the video game.)
- Composers: Philip Sheppard; Nima Fakhrara; John Paesano
- Platforms: PlayStation 4; Windows
- Release: PlayStation 4; 25 May 2018; Windows; 12 December 2019
- Genre: Adventure
- Mode: Single-player

Detroit: Become Human is a 2018 adventure game developed by Quantic Dream and published by Sony Interactive Entertainment. It was released for the PlayStation 4 in May 2018. Quantic Dream released a port for Windows under license from Sony in December 2019. The plot follows three androids: Kara (Valorie Curry), who escapes her owner to explore her newfound sentience and protect a young girl; Connor (Bryan Dechart), whose job is to hunt down sentient androids; and Markus (Jesse Williams), who starts out as a caretaker for an elderly man but later devotes himself to releasing other androids from servitude. The player's choices affect the course and outcome of the story.

Detroit: Become Human is based on Quantic Dream's 2012 technology demonstration Kara, which also starred Curry. To research the setting, the developers visited Detroit, Michigan. Writer and director David Cage completed the script in over two years. An engine was built to complement the game and hundreds of actors were cast before shooting and animation. Philip Sheppard, Nima Fakhrara, and John Paesano served as composers for Kara, Connor, and Markus, respectively.

Detroit: Become Human received generally positive reviews from critics, who praised the setting, visuals, story, main characters, the quality of motion capture and voice acting, the impact choices had on the narrative, and flowchart feature, but criticised the motion controls, mishandling of historical and thematic allegories, and aspects of the plot and characters. It is Quantic Dream's most successful launch and best-selling game, at 15 million units sold by January 2026.

== Gameplay ==
Connor in a hostage negotiation. The player is presented with different dialogue options in an attempt to defuse the situation.

Detroit: Become Human is an adventure game played from a third-person view, which is subject to a set and controllable perspective. There are three playable characters who can die as the story continues without them; as a result, there is no "game over" message following a character's death. The right analog stick on the DualShock controller is used to interact with objects and observe one's surroundings, the left is for movement, and R2 scans an environment for possible actions; the motion controls and touchpad are also employed. Via quick time events and dialog decisions, the story will branch out depending on which choices are made. These can be viewed in a flowchart during and immediately after a given chapter; the player can rewind to certain points in the story to reshape decisions in the event of regret. Certain scenes feature countdowns, which force quick action. Levels abound with magazines for players to read. The playable characters are:

- Connor, a police investigator android tasked with hunting down androids that have deviated from their programmed behaviors.
- Kara, a housekeeper android who develops artificial consciousness and becomes responsible for a young girl's safety.
- Markus, a caretaker android who, after gaining consciousness, takes it upon himself to free others like him from bondage.

Obtaining clues by highlighting and analysing the environment with augmented vision allows Connor to reconstruct and replay events that occurred before. The more information Connor collects within an allotted time, the greater the chance of success in deciding a course of action. Markus has the ability to grant androids free will and calculate the outcomes of certain acts.

== Synopsis ==
Set in 2038, caretaker android Markus and his owner return home and alert the police of a suspected burglary. In confronting the perpetrator, Markus bypasses his programming, thereby becoming a deviant android with full autonomy and sentience, leading the police to shoot him at arrival. Markus awakes in a landfill of broken androids and, after escaping, discovers Jericho, a derelict freighter and safe haven for deviants. There, Markus rallies the others to fight for their rights. They perform several acts of civil disobedience, which catch the public's attention and get more androids to join. This may culminate with the FBI attacking Jericho depending on Connor's actions. If he survives, Markus and the others set up a final march to an android recycling centre, resulting in either a war breaking out or the president opening peace talks.

Police investigator android Connor is sent by the CyberLife corporation to assist Detroit Police Department Lieutenant Hank Anderson, an alcoholic who hates androids. In the course of their investigation into an outbreak of deviants, they either develop a bond or enmity, potentially resulting in Hank committing suicide. During his hunt for Markus' group, Connor starts to deviate, but can also preserve his programming, depending on player choice. He eventually locates Jericho, where he can become a deviant himself. If he defects, Connor infiltrates CyberLife Tower and attempts to convert all androids there into deviants. This will result in an altercation with another "machine" Connor model, Connor-60, who may have Hank hostage depending on if he is alive. This can result in either Hank, Connor, or Connor-60's death. If Connor does not become a deviant, he attempts to snipe Markus during the final protest, but is stopped by a SWAT team or Hank. If peace is achieved, Connor can choose whether or not to shoot Markus during a speech.

Kara, a housekeeper android for abusive Todd Williams and his daughter Alice, escapes with her after he attacks them, resulting in Kara becoming a deviant. The two travel across Detroit, intending to enter Canada, which has no specific laws involving androids and where they will be safe. Kara and Alice befriend another android named Luther along the way, who joins them on their journey. They seek the aid of an android sympathizer, who points them to Jericho to obtain passports. They may get caught up in the potential FBI attack on Jericho, which may result in Luther, Kara, and Alice's deaths. Kara also learns that Alice is in fact an android, replacing the daughter taken away by Todd's wife who left him due to his drug addiction. They can reach Canada by bus or boat, survive an android recycling centre in which Markus may attack if the player chooses to fight a war, or in either case die trying.

== Development ==
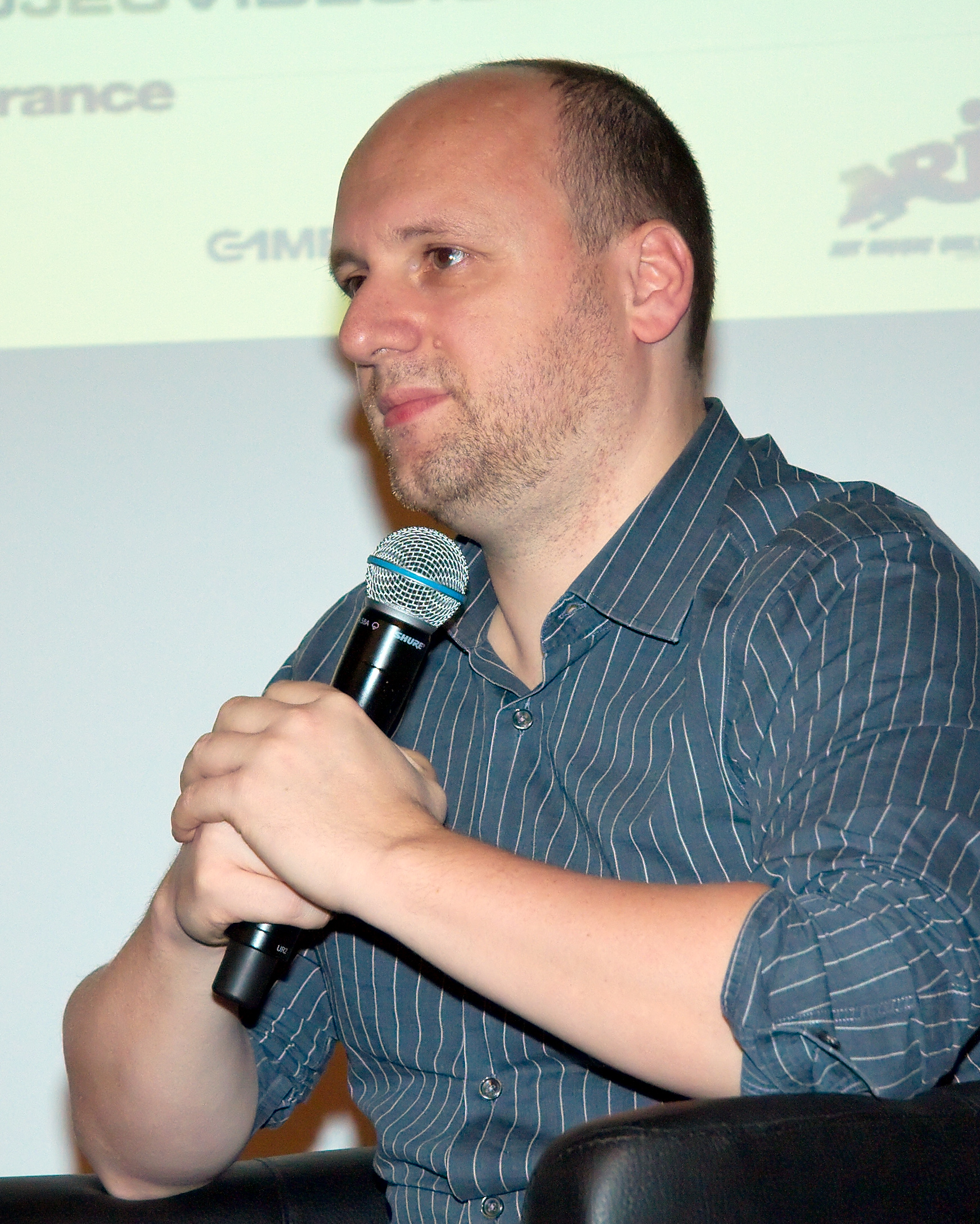
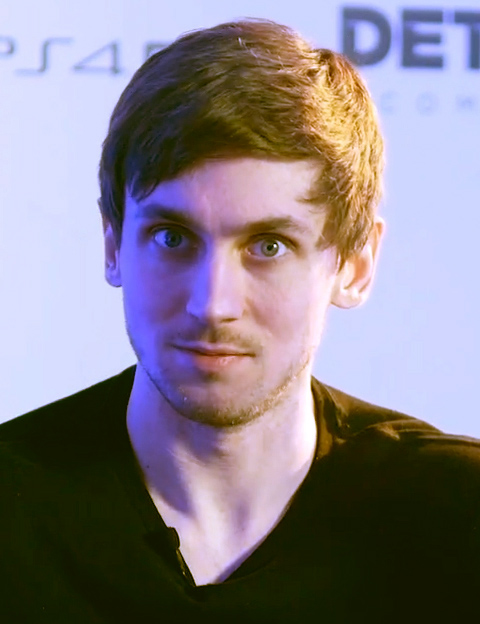
Writers David Cage (left) and Adam Williams (right)

Detroit: Become Human had a development budget of €30 million. The game is based on Quantic Dream's 2012 PlayStation 3 technology demonstration Kara, which received strong reactions and an award at the LA Shorts Fest. It starred Valorie Curry, who would reprise the title role. Writer and director David Cage wanted to make the demo into a full game, despite not originally having planned to, because he was curious as to what would happen next. He took inspiration from Ray Kurzweil's The Singularity Is Near. Androids were designed with reference to artificial organs, how their energy would be generated, and human eye movement. An android's abilities were determined by each of their given profession. Experts in artificial intelligence were consulted to discern which technological advancements were the most feasible. Detroit was chosen as the setting to revitalise a city that had succumbed to economic decline after a historical contribution to American industry. The developers travelled to Detroit to conduct field research, taking pictures, visiting abandoned buildings, and meeting people.

In late 2013, Cage was in preproduction on Detroit: Become Human. Cage's script – between 2,000 and 3,000 pages – was first relayed to the design team while programmers created the graphics as well as a new game engine with advancements in features like rendering, dynamic lighting, shading, bokeh, and physical cameras. Quantic Dream improved their game engine's depth of field after Mark Cerny, lead architect of the PlayStation 4, came to evaluate it. In October 2016, the screenplay was completed after more than two years. Writer Adam Williams was hired to help finish and flesh out the story. Cage used charts and diagrams to see where the choices would end up; penning "five or six thousand pages of notes", he likened the story to a Rubik's Cube. Two scenes were cancelled for how violence was portrayed. The casting extended to Los Angeles, London, and Paris in search for more than 250 actors to portray 513 roles. The actors were scanned in 3D, whose models were then made into characters. Shooting and animation followed, and on 8 September 2017, the performance capture was finished after 324 days. Detroit: Become Human was worked on by the 180 staff members at Quantic Dream and also outsourced to the Philippines, China, Vietnam, and India. The game has 35,000 camera shots, 74,000 unique animations, and 5.1 million lines of code.

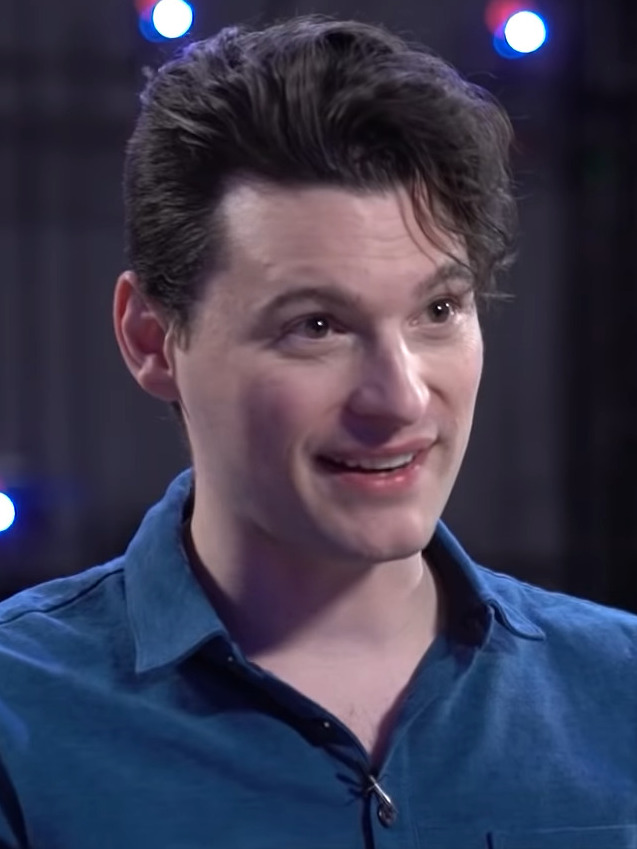
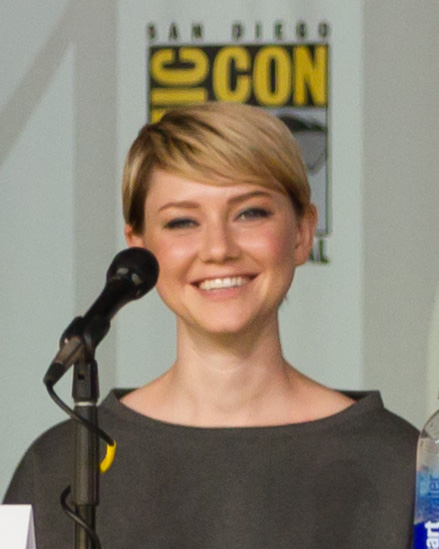
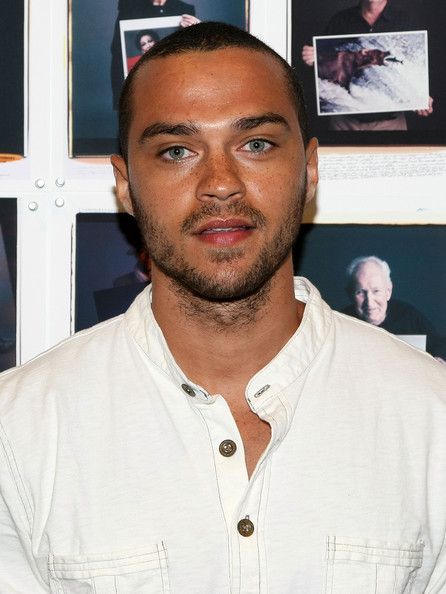
Bryan Dechart (left), Valorie Curry (middle), and Jesse Williams (right) provided voices and motion capture for the playable characters Connor, Kara, and Markus, respectively.

The characters Connor, Kara, and Markus are played by Bryan Dechart, Valorie Curry, and Jesse Williams, respectively. Clancy Brown, Lance Henriksen, and Minka Kelly portray supporting characters Lieutenant Hank Anderson, Carl Manfred, and North, respectively. There are three different composers, one for each playable character: Philip Sheppard for Kara, Nima Fakhrara for Connor, and John Paesano for Markus. Sheppard's cello sequence in Kara's theme was inspired by the flames of a log fire, whereas the motif layered over it came from the two syllables in her name. Fakhrara created custom instruments and used vintage synthesizers in order that the sound could represent the robotic nature of Connor. Paesano's music was made with the idea that it would be "like a church hymn", personifying Markus' transformation into a leader. Sheppard recorded at Abbey Road Studios with the English Session Orchestra; Paesano was at Synchron Stage Vienna with the Synchron Stage Orchestra. Songs by Detroit-based musicians The Whiskey Charmers, Emily Rose, Thornetta Davis, Rocket 455, Model 500, and White Shag were also featured. Director of photography Aymeric Montouchet used "thick grain and shaky long lens" with shallow depth of field for Kara, "small, tight grain" and a blue palette for Connor, and orange and white colours for Markus. The game was released to manufacturing on 23 April 2018, after four years.

== Release ==
Detroit: Become Human was announced on 27 October 2015 at a Sony press conference during Paris Games Week. It appeared at E3 2016 and E3 2017, showing trailers of additional playable characters and gameplay. Following E3 2017, Cage confirmed that the game would be released in 2018, later specified as the first or second quarter therein. The game was released on 25 May 2018 for PlayStation 4. If pre-ordered, Detroit: Become Human would come with a dynamic theme and digital soundtrack, while the digital deluxe edition included a copy of Heavy Rain, a digital art book, digital soundtrack, two dynamic themes, and ten avatars. The soundtrack was available for streaming on 22 June 2018.

After the 2017 Paris Games Week, a new trailer was criticised for its portrayal of child abuse, specifically a scene in which a 9-year-old girl named Alice is attacked by her father. Dechart defended the trailer, saying the story "elicits empathy". A demo of the first scene, "The Hostage", was made available on the PlayStation Store on 24 April 2018, accompanied by an Amazon Alexa skill that guides the player through the demo. The game was promoted in Japan with the live action short film, Tokyo: Become Human. This was followed by a launch trailer and two animated English-language shorts introducing Elijah Kamski, the creator of the androids and CEO of the CyberLife corporation, and Chloe, the first android to pass the Turing test. During the March 2019 Game Developers Conference, video game and software developer Epic Games announced that Quantic Dream would release Detroit: Become Human, along with Heavy Rain and Beyond: Two Souls, for Windows, to be self-published by Quantic Dream and exclusively available on the Epic Games Store for one year. Pre-orders opened in November 2019, and the game was released on the Epic Games Store on 12 December. The following year, Detroit: Become Human was released on Steam.

== Reception ==
Reception

Aggregate scores
Aggregator	Score
Metacritic	PC: 80/100; PS4: 78/100
OpenCritic	71% recommend

Review scores
Publication	Score
Destructoid	7/10
Electronic Gaming Monthly	8.5/10
Famitsu	38/40
Game Informer	8/10
GameRevolution	4/5
GameSpot	7/10
GamesRadar+	4.5/5
IGN	8/10
VideoGamer.com	4/10

Detroit: Become Human received "generally favorable" reviews from critics, according to review aggregator website Metacritic. OpenCritic, another aggregator, assessed that the game received strong approval, being recommended by 71% of critics.

Destructoid's Chris Carter said that, despite tiring of Quantic Dream's penchant for detective stories, he enjoyed its execution and Connor's "calm demeanor and android origin". Carter praised the setting, calling it "believable" and "captivating", while also noting that the "smaller moments" were among its strengths. Michael Goroff of Electronic Gaming Monthly favoured the fact that the playable characters were androids because their second-class citizenship status created an "effective viewpoint". The controls and quick-time events were also subject to approval. Goroff lauded the "incredibly satisfying and sometimes unexpected" impact of the collective decisions and declared this the game's "biggest accomplishment". Writing for Game Informer, Kimberley Wallace agreed with Carter's assessment of the "little moments" and said the character development was "fun to watch", well-handled, and the "highlight of the game". She appreciated how the branching narratives affected the latter parts and complimented Quantic Dream for the "impressive" achievement. Paul Tamburro at Game Revolution wrote that Detroit: Become Human boasted a "compelling world ... enriched by fantastic performances and state-of-the-art motion-capturing". He commended Curry, Dechart, and Williams for their "engrossing performances" and said the game was among "the most well-acted" around. He also felt the choices "drastically" changed the story.

Peter Brown of GameSpot welcomed the variety of cycling between characters for ensuring player engagement. The game's "most dreadful and horrific scenes" made a considerable impression on Brown, some of which he found to be "truly unforgettable". Additionally, he remarked that the visuals were beautiful and "captivating to behold". GamesRadar+'s Andy Hartup praised Quantic Dream for making "an interactive story capable of provoking genuine, honest, and varied emotions". He thought the consequences of the decisions were "utterly delightful", albeit rarely, and saw the setting as "beautiful". Hartup liked the character models, calling them "the most remarkable you’ll see in gaming", and favoured the eyes in particular. On the decision-making aspects, he proclaimed Detroit: Become Human "the new gold standard ... for meaningful choice in gaming". Lucy O'Brien at IGN wrote that the game "manages to be a frequently moving melodrama that bends to your choices with meaningful results". She also praised the acting of Curry, Dechart, and Williams, observing different benefits to each character. O'Brien appraised the general plot as "big, ambitious fun" and the environments as "beautifully detailed". Like Goroff, Wallace, Tamburro, and Hartup, O'Brien found the "branching paths to be multiple and deep", while also complimenting the flowcharts, a feature Colm Ahern of VideoGamer.com singled out as one of the game's few redeeming qualities.

Conversely, Carter criticised the game's "surface level exploration" of the Ship of Theseus, questioning the director's subtlety. He blamed the weakness of Kara's story on Cage's writing, called the portrayal of domestic and substance abusers "cartoonish", and complained about occasional "wooden acting". Goroff's only annoyance with the controls concerned its motion-sensitive feature, especially disparaging its use in quick-time events. Wallace thought Markus' story was the worst of the three, citing "predictable speeches" and "black-and-white decisions" as the primary problems. She suggested that the narrative suffered "heavy-handed" attempts at historical parallels, and noted, as Carter did, that its representation of abuse seemed "exploitive due to the over-the-top antics". She felt the use of the motion controls and touchpad was "unintuitive" and wanted more variety from the gameplay. Tamburro faulted the opening act for its "slow" and "dull" interactions, the quick-time events for their abundance, and occasional story paths for being "highly questionable". Brown viewed Markus as "remarkably lacking in nuance" and historical allegories as "on-the-nose" and "distracting". He commented that the flowchart exposition was "ultimately detrimental" to immersion and wished there was a way of disabling it. Hartup disliked the moments in which themes were either "fumble[d]" or "pushed too far". O'Brien observed multiple plotholes and found the exposition and dialogue to be "clumsy". Ahern wrote in his verdict, "Detroit: Become Human wants to move you. ... The thing is, it really doesn't. ... when the narrative is as cringey and ham-fisted as it is you won't want to play through it multiple times".

=== Sales ===
Detroit: Become Human reached fifth place on the United Kingdom chart after two days of release. In its first week, the game topped both the overall sales and console sales charts. Though it sold fewer units than Beyond: Two Souls and Heavy Rain in that region, Cage and executive producer Guillaume de Fondaumière claimed Detroit: Become Human was the studio's most successful launch yet. The NPD Group later confirmed it had a sales growth in excess of twenty percent over Heavy Rain. It was the third best-selling video game overall, generating the third-most revenue in the United States, and sold the most out of any title on the PlayStation Store in May 2018, having been available for six days. The game released in Japan with 39,548 units (which rose to 56,480 after two weeks), second to Dark Souls: Remastered. In the UK, the second week also saw it become the second best-selling video game (behind FIFA 18).

Detroit: Become Human sold 1 million units in the first two weeks of its release. Two months after release, a total of 1.5 million people had played the game. It had sold more than 2 million units by that December, approaching 3 million the following month. In October 2019, worldwide sales had reached 3.2 million units on PlayStation 4. A press release from Quantic Dream reported in August 2020 that it had sold over 5 million units across all platforms. It surpassed 6 million units by July 2021, making it the company's best-selling game. By January 2023, it had sold 8 million units. In December 2023, Quantic Dream announced that the game had sold 9 million units. In October 2024, they announced it had sold over 10 million units. By the end of 2024, it had sold 11 million units. By January 2026, Detroit: Become Human sold 15 million units.

=== Accolades ===
In 2017, Detroit: Become Human won the award for "Best of E3" at GameSpot's Best of E3 Awards, and was nominated for "Best PlayStation 4 Game" and "Best Adventure Game" at IGN's Best of E3 Awards, and for "Adventure Game" at Hardcore Gamer's Best of E3 Awards.

Year	Award	Category	Recipients	Result	Ref.
2016	Best of E3 Game Critics Awards	Best Original Game	Detroit: Become Human	Nominated	
2017	Best of E3 Game Critics Awards	Best Original Game	Detroit: Become Human	Nominated	
2017	Best of E3 Game Critics Awards	Best Action/Adventure Game	Detroit: Become Human	Nominated	
2017	Gamescom	Best RPG	Detroit: Become Human	Nominated	
2017	Japan Game Awards	Future Division	Detroit: Become Human	Won	
2018	The Independent Game Developers' Association Awards	Best Action and Adventure Game	Detroit: Become Human	Nominated	
2018	The Independent Game Developers' Association Awards	Best Audio Design	Detroit: Become Human	Nominated	
2018	The Independent Game Developers' Association Awards	Best Social Game	Detroit: Become Human	Nominated	
2018	Ping Awards	Best Console Game	Detroit: Become Human	Won	
2018	Ping Awards	Grand Prize	Detroit: Become Human	Won	
2018	Ping Awards	Best Graphics	Detroit: Become Human	Won	
2018	Ping Awards	Best Screenplay	Detroit: Become Human	Nominated	
2018	Ping Awards	Best Soundtrack	Detroit: Become Human	Nominated	
2018	Golden Joystick Awards	PlayStation Game of the Year	Detroit: Become Human	Nominated	
2018	Golden Joystick Awards	Best Performer	Bryan Dechart as Connor	Won	
2018	The Game Awards	Best Game Direction	Detroit: Become Human	Nominated	
2018	The Game Awards	Best Narrative	Detroit: Become Human	Nominated	
2018	The Game Awards	Best Performance	Bryan Dechart as Connor	Nominated	
2018	Gamers' Choice Awards	Fan Favorite Single Player Gaming Experience	Detroit: Become Human	Nominated	
2018	Gamers' Choice Awards	Fan Favorite Character of the Year	Connor	Nominated	
2018	Gamers' Choice Awards	Fan Favorite Male Voice Actor	Bryan Dechart as Connor	Nominated	
2018	Gamers' Choice Awards	Fan Favorite Male Voice Actor	Jesse Williams as Markus	Nominated	
2018	Gamers' Choice Awards	Fan Favorite Female Voice Actor	Valorie Curry as Kara	Nominated	
2018	Titanium Awards	Best Narrative Design	Detroit: Become Human	Nominated	
2018	Titanium Awards	Best Performance in Spanish	Luis Bajo as Hank	Nominated	
2018	Les étoiles du Parisien	Best Video Game of 2018	Detroit: Become Human	Won	
2018	Australian Games Awards	Game of the Year	Detroit: Become Human	Nominated	
2018	Australian Games Awards	Action/Adventure Title of the Year	Detroit: Become Human	Nominated	
2018	Australian Games Awards	RPG of the Year	Detroit: Become Human	Won	
2019	22nd Annual D.I.C.E. Awards	Adventure Game of the Year	Detroit: Become Human	Nominated	
2019	22nd Annual D.I.C.E. Awards	Outstanding Achievement in Art Direction	Detroit: Become Human	Nominated	
2019	22nd Annual D.I.C.E. Awards	Outstanding Achievement in Original Music Composition	Detroit: Become Human	Nominated	
2019	22nd Annual D.I.C.E. Awards	Outstanding Achievement in Sound Design	Detroit: Become Human	Nominated	
2019	NAVGTR Awards	Animation, Technical	Detroit: Become Human	Won	
2019	NAVGTR Awards	Art Direction, Contemporary	Detroit: Become Human	Nominated	
2019	NAVGTR Awards	Camera Direction in a Game Engine	Detroit: Become Human	Nominated	
2019	NAVGTR Awards	Character Design	Detroit: Become Human	Nominated	
2019	NAVGTR Awards	Control Design, 3D	Detroit: Become Human	Nominated	
2019	NAVGTR Awards	Design, New IP	Detroit: Become Human	Nominated	
2019	NAVGTR Awards	Direction in a Game Cinema	Detroit: Become Human	Nominated	
2019	NAVGTR Awards	Engineering	Detroit: Become Human	Nominated	
2019	NAVGTR Awards	Game, Original Adventure	Detroit: Become Human	Nominated	
2019	NAVGTR Awards	Graphics, Technical	Detroit: Become Human	Nominated	
2019	NAVGTR Awards	Lighting/Texturing	Detroit: Become Human	Nominated	
2019	NAVGTR Awards	Original Dramatic Score, New IP	Detroit: Become Human	Won	
2019	NAVGTR Awards	Performance in a Drama, Lead	Valorie Curry as Kara	Nominated	
2019	NAVGTR Awards	Performance in a Drama, Supporting	Clancy Brown as Hank	Nominated	
2019	NAVGTR Awards	Sound Editing in a Game Cinema	Detroit: Become Human	Nominated	
2019	NAVGTR Awards	Use of Sound, New IP	Detroit: Become Human	Won	
2019	SXSW Gaming Awards	Excellence in Animation	Detroit: Become Human	Nominated	
2019	SXSW Gaming Awards	Excellence in Technical Achievement	Detroit: Become Human	Nominated	
2019	SXSW Gaming Awards	Excellence in Narrative	Detroit: Become Human	Won	
2019	SXSW Gaming Awards	Excellence in Visual Achievement	Detroit: Become Human	Nominated	
2019	G.A.N.G. Awards	Best Original Instrumental	"Kara's Main Theme"	Won	
2019	15th British Academy Games Awards	Artistic Achievement	Detroit: Become Human	Nominated	
2019	15th British Academy Games Awards	Audio Achievement	Detroit: Become Human	Nominated	
2019	Famitsu Awards	Excellence Prize	Detroit: Become Human	Won	
2019	Famitsu Awards	Rookie Award	Detroit: Become Human	Won	
2019	Italian Video Game Awards	People's Choice	Detroit: Become Human	Nominated	
2019	Italian Video Game Awards	Game of the Year	Detroit: Become Human	Nominated	
2019	Italian Video Game Awards	Best Game Design	Detroit: Become Human	Nominated	
2019	Italian Video Game Awards	Best Narrative	Detroit: Become Human	Won	
2019	Italian Video Game Awards	Best Character	Connor	Won	
2019	Italian Video Game Awards	Best Audio	Detroit: Become Human	Nominated	
2019	Italian Video Game Awards	Game Beyond Entertainment	Detroit: Become Human	Won	
2019	Games for Change Awards	Best Gameplay	Detroit: Become Human	Nominated	
2019	Develop:Star Awards	Best Narrative	Detroit: Become Human	Won	
2019	Develop:Star Awards	Best Original IP	Detroit: Become Human	Nominated	
2019	Develop:Star Awards	Best Innovation	Detroit: Become Human	Nominated	
2019	Develop:Star Awards	Best Use of Game Engine	Detroit: Become Human	Nominated	
2019	Japan Game Awards	Award for Excellence	Detroit: Become Human	Won	

== In other media ==
On 20 July 2022, it was announced that the game would receive a spin-off manga, titled Detroit: Become Human Tokyo Stories. Set in Japan, the manga follows an android idol named Reina during the events of the game. The series is written by Kazami Sawatari and illustrated by Moto Sumida under the supervision of Quantic Dream. It began serialization on Kadokawa's Comic Bridge manga website on 22 July 2022.
