= Bryan Dechart =

American actor (born 1987)

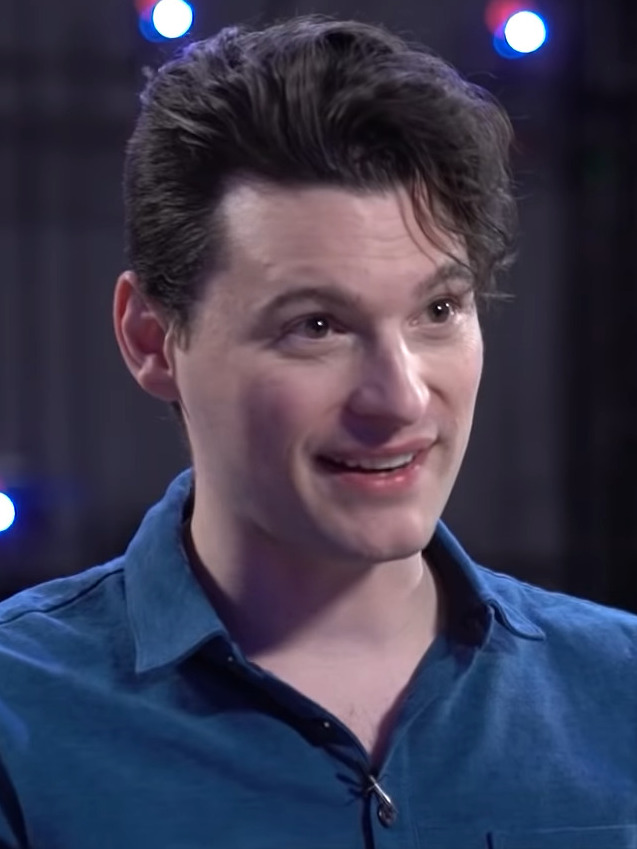
- Dechart c. 2020
- Born: Bryan Patrick Dechart; March 17, 1987 (age 39); Salt Lake City, Utah, U.S.
- Education: New York University Tisch School of the Arts
- Occupations: Actor; Twitch streamer
- Years active: 2008–present
- Spouse: Amelia Rose Blaire (m. 2018)
- Children: 1

Twitch information
- Channel: DechartGames
- Genre: Gaming
- Followers: 527,000

YouTube information
- Channel: Dechart Games
- Years active: 2018–present
- Genre: Gaming
- Subscribers: 487,000
- Views: 35 million
- Last updated: February 22, 2026

Bryan Patrick Dechart (/ˈdɛkɑːrt/ DEH-kart) (born March 17, 1987) is an American actor and Twitch streamer.

== Acting career ==
He is best known for his role as Connor in the video game Detroit: Become Human. He also played Eli Chandler on the television series Jane by Design and made appearances on Switched at Birth and True Blood.

== Personal life ==
Dechart was born in Salt Lake City, Utah and raised outside Novi, Michigan. He went to Novi High School and graduated from the New York University Tisch School of the Arts with a BFA in acting. He married actress Amelia Rose Blaire on June 30, 2018. They have one child, born in May 2024.

== Works ==
=== Film ===
Year	Title	Role	Notes
2008	For Your Entertainment	Tiger Stimmen	Short film
2008	Blue Balled	Young Republican	Short film
2008	Bar Mitzvah Season	Emcee	Short film
2009	Obelisk Road	Calvin McManus	Short film
2009	Tran • si • tions	Thomas	Short film
2009	If You Had Been The Moon	as himself	Short film
2009	Three Birds with One Stone	Hero	Short film
2010	Children at Play	Jack Wolf	Short film
2010	Step Up 3D	Anton	
2010	The Devil's Revenge	Dale Davish (voice)	
2010	Eros	Alex	Short film
2010	Pose	Boy in Bed	Short film
2010	Fish: A Boy in a Man's Prison	T.J. O'Rourke	Short film
2010	800 Pound Gorilla	Vincent	Short film
2011	Robot	Charlie	Short film
2011	Blown Away	Guido	Short film
2011	Storm	David	Short film
2011	Van Devi	Nick	Short film
2011	Dreams from a Petrified Head	Jeremy	Short film
2011	Behind the Scene	Cupid Model	
2012	Things I Don't Understand	Dan	
2012	Stayed For	Jeffrey Denison	Short film
2012	Rockaway	Donovan	Short film
2012	Patriot Girls	Allister	Short film
2012	Zoo Zoos and Wham Whams	Tim	Short film
2012	The Pit	Chris	Short film
2012	Commencement	Andrew	
2013	Awakened	Liam Dawson	
2014	2 Br / 1 Ba	Joe	
2014	Basically	Charlie	Short film
2014	Dakota's Summer	Taylor Chase	
2014	The Remaining	Dan Gardner	
2015	Roommate Wanted	Joe	
2015	As Good as You	Jamie	
2018	You'll Only Have Each Other	Gabe	Short film

=== Television ===
Year	Title	Role	Notes
2009	Guiding Light	Brian	1 episode
2009	Z Rock	Carterer	1 episode
2010	Law & Order: Criminal Intent	Younger John Silvestri	Episode: "Love on Ice"
2010	Celebrity Ghost Stories	Michael Urie	1 episode
2011	Blue Bloods	Photographer	Uncredited; Episode: "Dedication"
2012	Jane by Design	Eli Chandler	8 episodes
2013	Switched at Birth	Graham	Episode: "Ecce Mono"
2013	Beauty and the Beast	Aaron Keller	Episode: "Hothead"
2014	True Blood	Dave	Episode: "Death Is Not the End"

=== Web ===
Year	Title	Role	Notes
2019–2021	L.A. by Night	Vannevar Thomas	6 episodes
2008–2021	Prep School Blues	Larsen	9 episodes

=== Video games ===
Year	Title	Role	Notes
2016	Mafia III	Various	Uncredited
2018	Detroit: Become Human	Connor	Also motion capture
2018	Red Dead Redemption 2	The Local Pedestrian Population	
2020	Cyberpunk 2077	Brendan, Additional Voices	
2026	God of War Sons of Sparta	Agon The Pit of Agonies	
TBA	Lunafon: Tales of the Moon Oak	Noone	

=== Music videos ===
Year	Title	Artist(s)
2015	"We Are"	Dominique Toney
2011	"The Grind"	The Kobolds EP II

== Awards ==
Year	Award	Category	Nominated work	Result	Ref.
2018	Golden Joystick Awards	Best New Streamer/Broadcaster (shared with Amelia Rose Blaire)		Won	
2018	Golden Joystick Awards	Best Performer	Detroit: Become Human	Won	
2018	The Game Awards	Best Performance	Detroit: Become Human	Nominated	
2018	Gamers' Choice Awards	Fan Favorite Male Voice Actor	Detroit: Become Human	Nominated	
