= The Sanford Meisner Center for the Arts =

Defunct theater school in California, United States

Coordinates: 34.167768°N 118.347958°W

The Sanford Meisner Center for the Arts was the first and only theater and school created by Sanford Meisner himself, a famed acting teacher known for his unique approach to method acting.

In 1985, Meisner and Jimmy Carville co-founded The Meisner/Carville School of Acting on the island of Bequia in the West Indies. Then in 1995, they extended the school to North Hollywood, California, at The Sanford Meisner Center for the Arts; a theater company which was founded by Sanford Meisner, James Carville, Martin Barter and Jill Gatsby. Martin Barter was designated the center's artistic director, and head teacher. He continued to teach the Meisner Technique until February 2013, when he left the theater to return to Seattle WA. Subsequently, it was taken over by the ACME Comedy Theater and remains a working theater space.

Sanford Meisner's public memorial service was held at the theater on February 6, 1997.

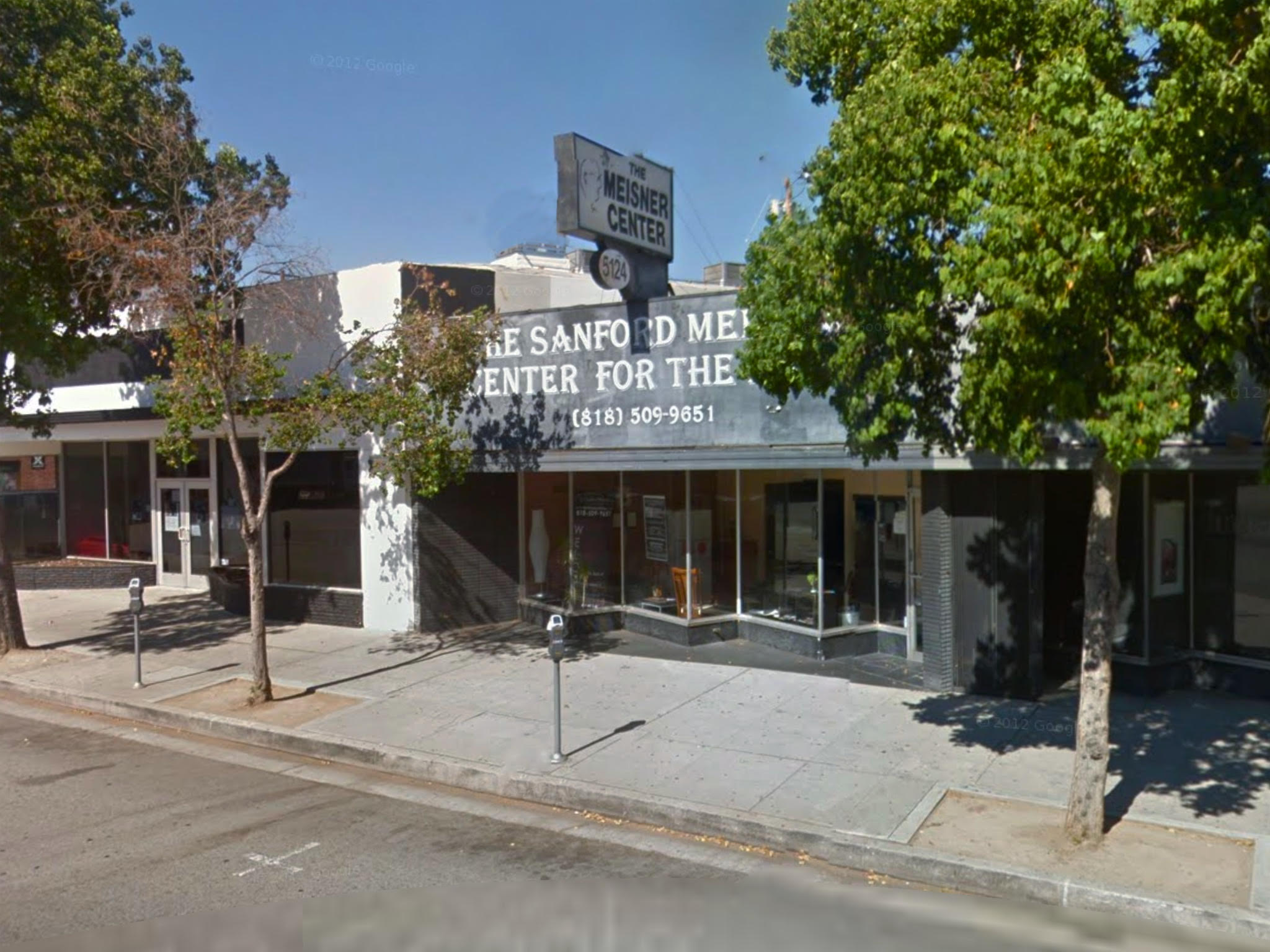
Original Theater front in North Hollywood Ca.

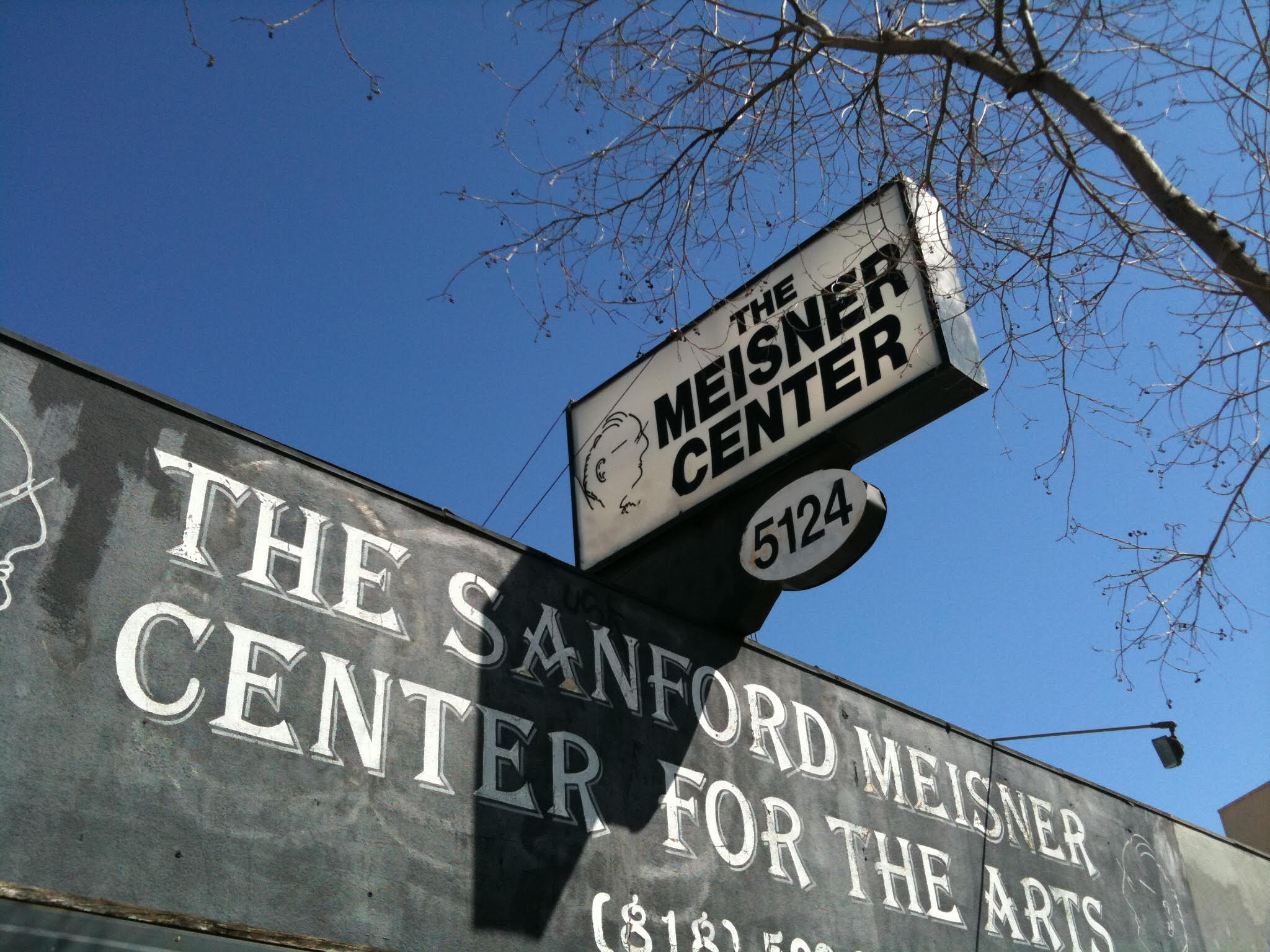
Original Theater front in North Hollywood Ca.
