= Kateryna Polishchuk =

Ukrainian singer, playwright, paramedic (born 2001)

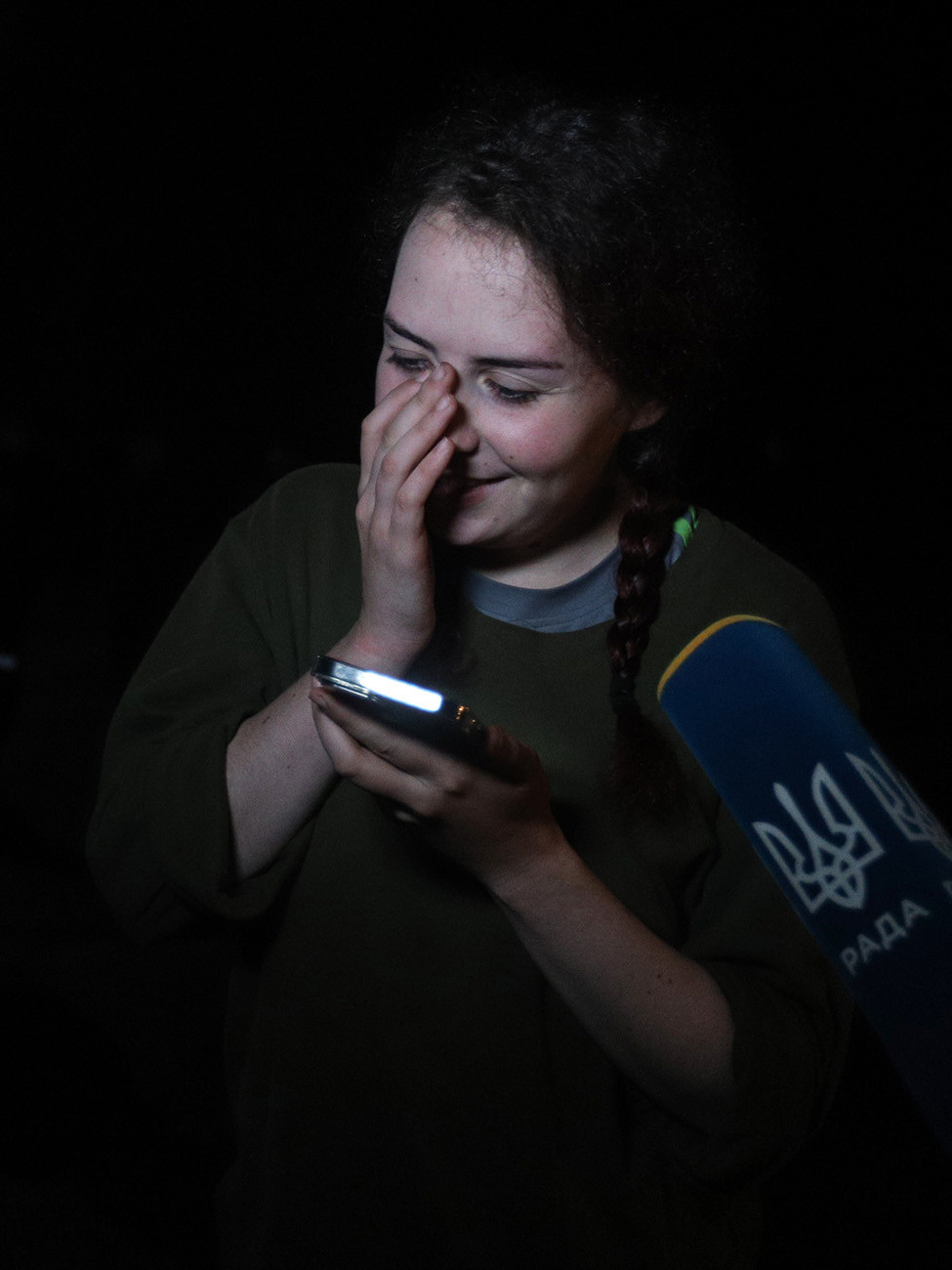
The Return of Kateryna Polishchuk, on 21 September 2022

Kateryna Oleksandrivna Polishchuk (Ukrainian: Катерина Олександрівна Поліщук, born March 31, 2001) is a Ukrainian singer, playwright, and a member of the National Guard of Ukraine as a paramedic. In 2022, she was a prisoner of war during the Russo-Ukrainian war. She was awarded the Order for Courage and made Honorary citizen of Ternopil. Her nom de guerre is Ptashka.

== Life ==
Kateryna Oleksandrivna Polishchuk was born on March 31, 2001 in Sosnivka, Ukraine. In 2020, she graduated with a degree in vocal performance from the Salome Krushelnytska Academy of Arts in Ternopil.

In 2021, she completed first aid courses in Kyiv. She then served in the war in Donbas as a member of the National Guard of Ukraine at a military hospital in Luhansk Oblast and, from November, as part of the Hospitaliter medical battalion in Donetsk Oblast, where she provided medical assistance to the military and civilian population as a medic.

After the start of the Russian invasion, she worked in a hospital in Mariupol as part of the Hospitaliter medical battalion during the siege. After it was bombed by the Russian invaders, she and other medical personnel had to hide from the enemy in the Azovstal factory. She sang patriotic songs of the OUN and UPA, such as the March of the Ukrainian Nationalists, in the factory's basements, which became popular online, making her one of the symbols of Azovstal. Polishchuk's involvement in the defense of Azovstal was reported in international media outlets such as CNN, Euronews, Watson, and the BBC.

On 19 May 2022, Polishchuk and other Ukrainian defenders and medics surrendered to Russian captivity on the orders of the President of Ukraine. In August, she was in a POW camp in Olenivka. On 21 September 2022, she returned as part of a prisoner exchange. Afterwards, she traveled around Europe to gather support for those on the front lines. In Brussels, she visited a special exhibition of photographs taken by Dmytro Kozatskyi, a military photographer who had also been hiding in Azovstal. On 24 February 2023, Polishchuk participated in a panel discussion at Bellevue Palace hosted by Frank-Walter Steinmeier and Oleksiy Makeyev. She provided the musical program, with Ukrainian students from the Barenboim-Said Academy. On February 26, she stood on a Russian tank in front of the Russian embassy in Berlin and sang the song Oi u luzi chervona kalyna.

In August 2022, Polishchuk was listed by Forbes 30 under 30 of young Ukrainians who will shape the future of the country.

Polishchuk is also known as a playwright and is the author of the play "Розлучені теж сміються" ("Even Divorced People Laugh"), which was performed at the Ternopil People's Theatre.
