= Stafford Brothers discography =

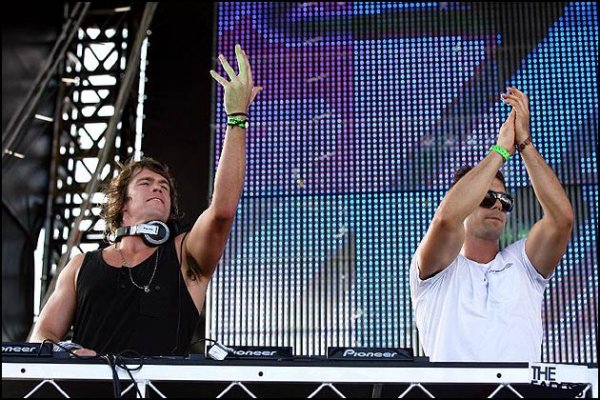
- Studio albums: multiple
- Singles: multiple

The following is the discography of the Stafford Brothers, DJs and producers from Australia known for blending the genres of house. They have released DJ mixes on Ministry of Sound Australia with artists such as Tommy Trash and Steve Aoki, as well as many singles. Among their better known songs are "Hello", which charted at No. 4 on the ARIA chart.

== DJ mixes ==
DJ mixes by Stafford Brothers
Year	Album title	Release details
2007	The Electro House Sessions (with Tommy Trash)	Released: 2007; Label: Ministry of Sound Australia; Format: 2CD
2008	The Electro House Sessions vol. 2 (with Tommy Trash)	Released: 2008; Label: Ministry of Sound Australia; Format: 2CD
2009	Clubbers Guide Spring 2009 (with Sidney Samson and Sam La More)	Released: 2009; Label: Ministry of Sound Australia; Format: 3CD
2009	Clubbers Guide to 2009 (with Bass Kleph and The Aston Shuffle)	Released: 2009; Label: Ministry of Sound Australia; Format: 3CD
2010	Sessions Seven (with Tommy Trash & Steve Aoki)	Released: 2010; Label: Ministry of Sound Australia; Format: 3CD
2012	Season 2 Soundtrack	Released: 2012; Label: Ministry of Sound Australia; Format: CD

== Singles ==
List of singles, with selected chart positions
Title	Year	Peak chart positions	Certifications	Album
Title	Year	AUS	Certifications	Album
"More Than a Feeling" (cover of Boston) (featuring Peter Millwood)	2006	90		Non-album singles
"Wherever" (Stafford Brothers vs. Hoxton Whores featuring Frank Stafford)	2009	— (Note: "Wherever" did not enter the ARIA Singles Chart, but peaked at number 35 on the ARIA Physical Singles Chart.)		Non-album singles
"Hello" (featuring Lil Wayne and Christina Milian)	2012	4	ARIA: 2× Platinum	Non-album singles
"Wicked Child" (Jason Herd & Stafford Brothers featuring Sherry St.Germain)	2013	61		Non-album singles
"This Girl" (featuring Eva Simons and T.I.)	2014	58		Non-album singles
"When You Feel This" (featuring Rick Ross and Jay Sean)	2015	70		Non-album singles
"Love Cliche"	2017	—		Non-album singles
"Knock"	2018	—		Non-album singles
"—" denotes a recording that did not chart or was not released in that territory.

== Other releases ==
List of other releases, as lead artist and as featured artist
Title	Year	Label
Zoro EP	2007	Central Station Records
"Darkness Falls" / "Alone"	2008	Central Station Records
"I'm Feeling" (with Oliver Lang featuring Towera)	2008	Hussle Recordings
"Open Up Your Arms" (with Dabruck & Klein)	2009	WePLAY Music
"Give Love"	2009	Pacha Recordings
"Speaker Freakers" (featuring Seany B)	2010	Hussle Recordings
"I Gave You Everything" (with Juan Kidd featuring Rae)	2010	Defected
"Sing for Me" (with Jean Elan)	2010	WePLAY Music
"Wasted (Baba O'Riley)" (cover of The Who)	2010	Astrx
"Can't Stop What We Started" (with Jason Herd featuring Ollie James)	2010	Hussle Recordings
"Champagne Nights" (featuring Jamie Lee Wilson)	2011	Hussle Recordings
"Everybody" (Real Madrid)	2011	ZOVA Sports Music; International
"Falling" (featuring Ollie James)	2012	Astrx
"Pressure" (featuring MDPC)	2012	Cr2 Records Australia
"Hands Up" (Future Music Festival 2013 Anthem) (featuring Lil Jon)	2013	Future Music
"Are You Ready?"	2013	Neon Records
"Mental" (with Jealous Much?)	2014	Neon Records
"Running on Empty" (with Disco Fries featuring Miss Palmer)	2014	Big & Dirty
"Carne Asada" (with M35)	2014	Vicious
