= Shaun David Barker =

- Born: Brisbane, Australia
- Occupations: Talent Manager, Music Executive, Marketing Executive, Writer, Producer
- Instruments: Bass Guitar, Guitar, Piano

Shaun David Barker is an Australian-born talent manager, marketing executive and executive music producer. He manages and markets Australian DJs including Timmy Trumpet, Stafford Brothers and tyDi, who have all been voted the number 1 DJs in Australia at the ITM Awards.

Barker has managed marketing campaigns for over 20 singles including the three times platinum selling and ARIA nominated 'Hello' by Stafford Brothers feat. Lil Wayne & Christina Milian, and the 5 times platinum selling 'Freaks' by Timmy Trumpet & Savage.

In 2012, he appeared as himself in Season Two of the FOX8 reality TV series The Stafford Brothers. Barker is currently the Creative Director at TPH Media in Los Angeles and is involved in the development and production of feature films based around music content.

== Early life ==
Barker was born in Brisbane, Australia, to parents David Barker, a musician and scientist, and Leanne Barker.

== Career ==
=== Music Management ===
Barker served as head of production for a series of albums, mix compilations and singles under the GeneratioNext banner from 2007 to 2010.

Barker is the only music manager to have three DJs named the number 1 DJ in Australia, six times in total.

Barker managed the marketing campaigns for singles featuring artists including Stafford Brothers, Lil Wayne, Christina Milian, T.I., Eva Simons, Timmy Trumpet, Savage, Lil Jon, Erick Morillo, Nadia Ali, and Carnage.

=== Marketing & Development ===
From 2012 – 2015, Barker was the brand and marketing manager for the Stafford Brothers.

In 2012 and 2013, Barker was a guest speaker and panelist at EMC (Electronic Music Conference) on the subject of brand marketing in music.
