= Just Dance 2020 =

2019 video game

- North American cover art
- Developers: Ubisoft Paris; Ubisoft Pune; Ubisoft Shanghai; Ubisoft Bordeaux
- Publisher: Ubisoft
- Series: Just Dance
- Engine: UbiArt Framework
- Platforms: Nintendo Switch; PlayStation 4; Wii; Xbox One; Stadia
- Release: Switch, PS4, Wii, Xbox One: WW: November 5, 2019; Stadia: WW: November 19, 2019
- Genre: Music
- Modes: Single-player; multiplayer

Just Dance 2020 is a 2019 dance rhythm game developed and published by Ubisoft. It is the eleventh main installment of the Just Dance series, following Just Dance 2019, and was a celebration of the series' tenth anniversary. The game was originally released on November 5, 2019, for Nintendo Switch, PlayStation 4, Wii, and Xbox One, and on November 19 for Stadia. It was the last main Just Dance game released on the Wii console—the platform where the series made its debut in 2009—as well as the last Wii game released physically in Australia and North America.

== Development and release ==
It was unveiled on June 10, 2019, during its E3 press conference.

The game was exclusively released on the Nintendo Switch in Japan on March 12, 2020, and in China on December 24, 2020, in the latter of which the game is simply titled Just Dance.

Just Dance 2020 is the final Wii video game ever released physically in North America. It was reported in 2020 that Nintendo of America was no longer able to physically distribute Wii video games in that region because some of its departments could no longer retrieve the necessary equipment to do so. Consequently, this was the final video game in the main Just Dance series released on the Wii console, the platform where the series made its debut in 2009. By extension, this was the final Wii video game published by Ubisoft, the final Just Dance game released on a seventh-generation console, and the final Just Dance game available on a Nintendo optical disc.

== Gameplay ==
As with the previous installments of the franchise, players must mimic the on-screen dancer's choreography to a chosen song using either motion controllers (Wii Remotes on Wii, PlayStation Move and PlayStation Camera on PlayStation 4, Kinect on Xbox One, and Joy-Con on Nintendo Switch) or the game's associated smartphone app (except on Nintendo's Wii console). The Stadia version also allows the use of a gamepad and a keyboard for menu navigation.

While the Wii version is based on Just Dance 2015, with the exclusion of the game's online features (the "Just Dance Wall" feature, the "challenge" feature, and the "World Dance Floor" mode), the user interface and features in the current-gen console and Stadia versions are largely identical to Just Dance 2019, with the addition of a new "All Stars" mode commemorating the franchise's tenth anniversary (which features a playlist of eleven songs: "Hot n Cold (Chick Version)" from Just Dance, "Rasputin" from Just Dance 2, "California Gurls" from Just Dance 3, "You're the First, the Last, My Everything" from Just Dance 4, "Starships" from Just Dance 2014, "Built for This" from Just Dance 2015, "Chiwawa" from Just Dance 2016, "Lean On" from Just Dance 2017, "Swish Swish" from Just Dance 2018, "Bang Bang Bang" from Just Dance 2019, and "High Hopes" from Just Dance 2020). The story of this mode follows the Panda on a trip across eleven planets aboard the "dance party bus", as he brings over coaches from each aforementioned song featured in previous installments of the series to throw a dance party at the coliseum in the final planet. In the ending, the Reindeer jumped into the party via his ship, as another dance party was found on another galaxy, as they head towards the ship and sets off. Completing the mode will unlock "High Hopes" in Just Dance mode, which is also unlocked by entering a secret code before completing it. Co-op mode, returning from Just Dance 2016 and Just Dance 2017, has been revamped, using its traditional scoring system, allowing players to earn stars as a team. On February 28, 2023, the "All Stars" mode was taken offline, making the code method the only option to unlock "High Hopes".

The Chinese version of the game does not feature the traditional karaoke-styled lyrics and is instead replaced with scrolling lyrics that are translated to Chinese, even when in Kids Mode and the "World Dance Floor" mode, which is only matched with players across China in the Chinese version instead of being matched with players across the world in the International version. The Just Dance Unlimited service for the Chinese version is different than the international version, but it can't be used between both versions, as they are separate versions of the service. Furthermore, online multiplayer is added as an exclusive feature to the Chinese version to coincide with the release of Just Dance 2023 Edition. Unlike the said game, it's played in public parties of up to six players in custom playlists. However, the Chinese version's menu design is based on the current installment of the main series (up into Just Dance 2022), which changes alongside its release, albeit with seasonal events, which temporarily replaces it with a special menu design based on the current seasonal event. Starting from Season 7, the Sweat Mode is removed and replaced with an optional built-in kCal tracker shown below the player's name. The "Double Rumble" routines from Just Dance 2018 are playable in the Chinese version within Just Dance Unlimited and don't require a second Joy-Con, therefore using the traditional gameplay. Furthermore, select Mashups from Just Dance 2016 and Just Dance 2017, including the Quadro Mashup of "You're On My Mind" from Just Dance 2015, which was an unlockable Ubisoft Connect reward in the former game, are available as well.

== Soundtrack ==
The following songs appear on Just Dance 2020:

Song	Artist	Year
"365"	Zedd and Katy Perry	2019
"7 Rings" (Note: Previously exclusive to Just Dance Unlimited in Just Dance 2019 from October 17, 2019 to October 24, 2019)	Ariana Grande	2019
"Always Look on the Bright Side of Life" (Note: Only available on 8th-generation consoles and Stadia; exclusive to Just Dance Unlimited in the Chinese version)	The Frankie Bostello Orchestra (as made famous by Monty Python)	1979
"Baby Shark"	Pinkfong	2015
"Bad Boy"	Riton and Kah-Lo	2018
"Bad Guy"	Billie Eilish	2019
"Bangarang"	Skrillex featuring Sirah	2012
"Bassa Sababa"	Netta	2019
"Con Altura"	Rosalía and J Balvin featuring El Guincho	2019
"Con Calma"	Daddy Yankee featuring Snow	2019
"Coolest Ethnic" (Note: Also known as "Zui Xun Min Zu Feng") (Note: Originally exclusive to China's Just Dance Unlimited servers, but has since been available on the main soundtrack of the Chinese version of the game; only playable with an internet connection)	Phoenix Legend	2009
"Everybody (Backstreet's Back)"	Millennium Alert (as made famous by Backstreet Boys)	1997
"Fancy"	Twice	2019
"Fancy Footwork" (Note: Exclusive to Just Dance Unlimited in the Chinese version)	Chromeo	2007
"Fit but You Know It"	The Streets	2004
"Get Busy" (Note: Can be unlocked using a secret code; available on main soundtrack for Wii)	Koyotie	2019
"God Is a Woman"	Ariana Grande	2018
"High Hopes" (Note: Can be unlocked after completing it in "All Stars" mode or by using a secret code; available on main soundtrack for Wii)	Panic! at the Disco	2018
"Hot Pot Cool" (Note: Also known as "Huo Guo Shuang") (Note: Only available in the Chinese version)	Aya Liu	2014
"I Am the Best"	2NE1	2011
"I Don't Care"	Ed Sheeran and Justin Bieber	2019
"I Like It"	Cardi B, Bad Bunny and J Balvin	2018
"Infernal Gallop (Can-Can)" (Note: Also available on the demo for the Chinese version)	The Just Dance Orchestra (as made famous by Jacques Offenbach)	1858
"Into the Unknown" (Note: Only playable on 8th-generation consoles and Stadia with an internet connection; exclusive to Just Dance Unlimited in the Chinese version)	Idina Menzel featuring Aurora (credited as Disney's Frozen 2)	2019
"Just an Illusion"	Equinox Stars (as made famous by Imagination)	1982
"Keep in Touch"	JD McCrary	2019
"Kill This Love" (Note: Also available on the demo version)	Blackpink	2019
"Le Bal Masqué"	Dr. Creole (as made famous by La Compagnie Créole)	1984
"Ma Itù"	Stella Mwangi	2019
"My New Swag" (Note: Also known in the Chinese version as "Wo De Xin Yi")	Vava featuring Ty. and Nina Wang	2017
"Old Town Road (Remix)" (Note: Also available as a bonus song for the demo version for Xfinity customers, alongside "Let's Groove" from Just Dance 2016)	Lil Nas X featuring Billy Ray Cyrus	2019
"Policeman"	Eva Simons featuring Konshens	2015
"Princess" (Note: Also known as "Wang Fei")	Jam Hsiao	2009
"Rain Over Me"	Pitbull featuring Marc Anthony	2011
"Rainbow Beats" (Note: Also known as "Cai Hong Jie Pai")	Yi Yan/Zhao Fang Jing/Suika Kune/Feizaojun	2020
"Skibidi"	Little Big	2018
"Só Depois do Carnaval"	Lexa	2019
"Soy Yo"	Bomba Estéreo	2015
"Stop Movin'"	Royal Republic	2019
"Sushi"	Merk & Kremont	2018
"Taki Taki"	DJ Snake featuring Selena Gomez, Ozuna and Cardi B	2018
"Talk"	Khalid	2019
"Tel Aviv" (Note: Not available in the Saudi Arabian and Iraqi versions)	Omer Adam featuring Arisa	2013
"The Time (Dirty Bit)"	The Black Eyed Peas	2010
"Ugly Beauty" (Note: Also known in the Chinese version as "Guai Mei De")	Jolin Tsai	2018
"Vodovorot"	XS Project	2011

Kris Wu's "Big Bowl Thick Noodle" (also known as "Da Wan Kuan Mian") was included in initial pressings of the Chinese version of the game, but was removed shortly after its alternate version was released on China's Just Dance Unlimited servers due to sexual assault allegations against the artist. Following this, Phoenix Legend's "Coolest Ethnic" (also known as "Zui Xun Min Zu Feng"), which was previously exclusive to China's Just Dance Unlimited servers from February 5, 2021, was made available for free indefinitely.

=== Kids Mode ===
The following songs appear on the Kids Mode of the game:

Song	Artist	Year
"Baby Shark"	Pinkfong	2015
"Freeze Please"	The Just Dance School	2019
"Happy Birthday"	Top Culture	1893
"Into the Unknown" (Note: Only playable on 8th-generation consoles and Stadia with an internet connection; exclusive to Just Dance Unlimited in the Chinese version)	Idina Menzel featuring Aurora (credited as Disney's Frozen 2)	2019
"Jungle Dances"	The Sunlight Shakers	2019
"Kitchen Kittens"	Cooking Meow Meow	2019
"Magical Morning"	The Just Dance Orchestra	2019
"Mini Yo School"	Dancing Bros.	2019
"My Friend the Dragon"	The Just Dance Orchestra	2019
"The Frog Concert"	Groove Century	2019

Note: With the exception of "Into the Unknown", these songs also can be played on Wii.

=== Just Dance Unlimited ===
Just Dance Unlimited continues to be offered on 2020 for eighth-generation consoles, featuring a streaming library of new and existing songs. The service also made its debut on Stadia with the release of 2020.

Songs exclusive to Just Dance Unlimited include:

Song	Artist	Year	Release date
"Djadja" (Note: Also available as a French-exclusive track on the soundtrack)	Aya Nakamura	2018	November 5, 2019 (France); December 5, 2019 (Worldwide)
"10.000 luchtballonnen" (Note: Also available as a Benelux region-exclusive track on the soundtrack)	K3	2015	November 5, 2019 (Benelux region); December 23, 2019 (Worldwide)
"Spinning" (Note: Also available as a Russian-exclusive track on the soundtrack)	Monatik	2016	November 5, 2019 (Russia); December 23, 2019 (Worldwide)
"Panini" (Note: Season 1: Winter Wonderland)	Lil Nas X	2019	December 19, 2019
"Sucker"	Jonas Brothers	2019	January 16, 2020
"Don't Call Me Up"	Mabel	2019	January 23, 2020
"1999"	Charli XCX and Troye Sivan	2018	January 30, 2020
"Woman Like Me" (Note: Season 2: Feel The Power)	Little Mix featuring Nicki Minaj	2018	May 14, 2020
"EZ Do Dance" (Note: Previously appeared in Just Dance Wii U)	TRF	1993	May 20, 2020 (Japan)
"X"	Nicky Jam and J Balvin	2018	May 20, 2020
"Boys" (Alternate)	Lizzo	2018	May 28, 2020
"Hype" (Note: Season 3: Virtual Paradise)	Dizzee Rascal and Calvin Harris	2016	July 23, 2020
"La Respuesta" (Note: Originally meant to be in the main tracklist)	Becky G and Maluma	2019	July 30, 2020
"Crayon"	G-Dragon	2012	August 6, 2020
"White Noise"	Disclosure featuring AlunaGeorge	2013	August 13, 2020

==== Chinese servers ====
Songs exclusive to the Chinese version of Just Dance Unlimited include:

Song	Artist	Year	Release date
"All You Gotta Do (Is Just Dance)" (Chinese Version) (Note: Chinese-language version of a song that previously appeared in Just Dance 2018, which is also known as "Wu Li Quan Kai")	The Just Dance Band	2017	December 24, 2020 (Classic); July 16, 2021 (Alternate); June 10, 2022 (Simple)
"Beir Shuang" (Note: Also known as "Cool Times (So Good)")	Wowkie Zhang	2014	February 5, 2021
"Xiao Ji Xiao Ji" (Note: Also known as "Chick Chick") (Note: Also appeared in Just Dance: Vitality School, a former Chinese version of Just Dance Now)	Wang Rong Rollin	2014	February 5, 2021
"Let's Party" (Note: Tie-in to the Chinese version of PUBG Mobile known as Game for Peace (also known as Peacekeeper Elite) in celebration of the game's 2nd anniversary.)	Wu Xuanyi	2021	April 30, 2021
"Jiu Ge" (Note: Also known as "Drinking Song")	Hanggai	2007	July 16, 2021
"Qing Chun Zai Zhao Huan" (Note: Also known as "Youth is Calling") (Note: Tie-in to Adidas Neo in China)	Adidas Neo & Just Dance	2021	August 27, 2021
"Gong Xi Gong Xi" (Note: Released to celebrate Chinese New Year; available only during the Chinese New Year celebration.)	The Just Dance Band (as made famous by Yao Lee and Yao Min)	1945	January 21, 2022
"Xiao Chou" (Note: Also known as "Clown")	Wilber Pan	2014	January 21, 2022
"Gorgeous Diva"	Monki	2022	January 21, 2022
"Little Apple" (Note: Also appeared in the Chinese version of Just Dance 2015) (Note: Also known as "Xiao Ping Guo")	Chopstick Brothers	2014	January 21, 2022
"Ai" (Note: Also known as "Love")	The Just Dance Band (as made famous by Xiao Hu Dui)	1991	January 21, 2022
"Dare to Live" (Note: Tie-in to the 2021 Summer World University Games)	Trady	2021	April 8, 2022
"Gee"	Girls' Generation	2009	June 10, 2022
"Gokuraku Jodo"	Garnidelia	2016	June 10, 2022
"Ugly Beauty" (Note: Also known as "Guai Mei De") (Alternate)	Jolin Tsai	2018	June 10, 2022
"Bailemen Swing" (Note: Also known as "Paramount Swing")	Shanghai Restoration Project featuring Zhang Le	2015	September 29, 2022
"Tu Zi Wu" (Note: Also known as "Penguin's Game")	Gelato	1997	January 16, 2023
"Shi Wo De Yi Da" (Note: Also known as "It's My Orbit") (Note: Tie in with Orbit in China)	Zhang Yanqi, Veegee Xu Ruoqiao and Zhao Rui	2023	April 28, 2023
"Dancing Diva" (Note: Also known as "Wu Niang")	The Girly Team (as made famous by Jolin Tsai)	2006	June 9, 2023
"Señorita" (VIP Alternate)	Shawn Mendes and Camila Cabello	2019	June 23, 2023
"If You Wanna Party" (Chinese Version) (Note: Chinese-language version of a song that previously appeared in Just Dance 2023 Edition, which is also known as "Wu Li Pai Dui", which is also available in the Demo version from late December 2023 to early January 2024 to celebrate its 3rd anniversary.)	The Just Dancers	2022	December 2023

== Reception ==
=== Sales ===
Just Dance 2020 debuted at #15 in the UK, with the Nintendo Switch version accounting for 55% of sales, followed by the Wii at 21%, PlayStation 4 at 14%, and the Xbox One at 10%. The Nintendo Switch version of the game debuted at #3 in Taiwan, while the PlayStation 4 version debuted at #4 in South Korea. In Japan, the Switch version sold 2,533 copies during its first week of release, which made it the 26th bestselling retail game of the week.

=== Awards ===
The game was nominated for "Best Family/Social Game" at the 2019 Titanium Awards, and for "Best Game-as-a-Service" at the Pégases Awards 2020.
