= Alex James (songwriter) =

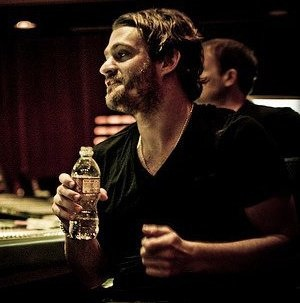
- Alex James in a studio

Background information
- Born: Alexander James; 19 October 1976 (age 49); South London, England
- Genres: Pop
- Occupations: Songwriter, record producer, publisher
- Years active: 2008–present

Alexander "Alex" James (born 19 October 1976, South London, England) is a British songwriter, best known for his work with Jason Derulo, Adam Lambert, Katharine McPhee, Wanessa, 2008 The X Factor winner Alexandra Burke, and South Korean female pop group Girls' Generation. His first album cut was for Scottish singer-songwriter Darius Danesh, and in 2009 penned American Idol finalist Elliot Yamin's song "This Step Alone" from Yamin's Fight For Love album. He also has songs on albums by Australian singer-songwriter Ricki-Lee Coulter, British pop group Girls Aloud member Nadine Coyle, and Charice of the TV show Glee, among others.

His influences include James Taylor, The Smiths, Timbaland, Babyface, and The Killers. James works primarily on piano and keyboard when composing songs, though he also plays guitar. He grew up in South London and lives between Los Angeles and London.

== Notable releases ==
Year	Artist	Title	Album
2017	Fenech Soler	"Conversation"	
2016	Steve Aoki & Felix Jaehn ft Adam Lambert	"Can't Go Home"	Single
2015	Lena Meyer-Landrut	"Traffic Lights"	Crystal Sky
2015	Alesha Dixon	"Tallest Girl"	Do It for Love (Alesha Dixon album)
2015	Alesha Dixon	"Way We Are"	Do It for Love (Alesha Dixon album)
2015	Alesha Dixon	"Do It For Love"	Do It for Love (Alesha Dixon album)
2015	Alesha Dixon	"Count On You"	Do It for Love (Alesha Dixon album)
2015	Marina Kaye	"Dancing with the Devil"	Fearless
2014	Stafford Brothers (ft T.I & Eva Simons)	"This Girl"	
2013	Stafford Brothers (ft Lil Wayne & Christina Milian)	"Hello" (Stafford Brothers song) nominated for ARIA Award for Song of the Year	
2013	Shakira	"Flawless"	Crest TV Ad Campaign
2012	Medina (singer)	"Scars"	For altid
2012	Medina (singer)	"Boring"	For altid
2012	Faith Evans ft Keke Wyatt	"Mr SupaFly" Grammy nomination for Best R&B Album	R&B Divas
2011	Wanessa	"Stuck on Repeat"	DNA (Wanessa album)
2011	Keshia Chanté	"Set You Free"	Night & Day
2011	Jessica Mauboy	"Nobody Knows"	Get 'Em Girls
2010	Gloria Trevi	"Fuego con Fuego"	Gloria (álbum de Gloria Trevi)
2010	Jake Zyrus	"The Truth Is"	Charice
2010	Nadine Coyle	"Rumours"	Insatiable
2010	Alesha Dixon	"La La La"	The Entertainer
2010	Alesha Dixon	"Cool With Me"	The Entertainer
2010	Marion Raven	"Flesh and Bone"	Nevermore
2010	Girls' Generation	"Hoot"	Hoot (EP)
2010	Alexandra Burke	"Bad Boys" feat. Flo Rida	Overcome
2010	Talay Riley	"U.F.O."	Humanoid EP
2010	Preeya Kalidas	"Shimmy"	Constant Craving
2010	Jason Derulo	"Strobelight"	Jason Derülo
2010	Jason Derulo	"Encore"	Jason Derülo
2010	Jason Derulo	"The Sky's the Limit"	Jason Derülo
2010	Girls' Generation	"Run Devil Run"	Oh!
2009	Girls' Generation	"Destiny"	Gee
2009	Ricki-Lee Coulter	"Hear No, See No, Speak No"	Hear No, See No, Speak No
2009	Adam Lambert	"Sure Fire Winners"	For Your Entertainment
2009	Alexandra Burke	"Bad Boys" feat. Flo Rida (#1 UK Single, Brit Award Nominee)	Overcome
2009	Tata Young	"My Bloody Valentine" (#1 Asia, Oricon chart)	Ready For Love
2009	Katharine McPhee	"How" (Single)	Unbroken
2009	Backstreet Boys	"Masquerade"	This Is Us
Elliott Yamin	"This Step Alone"	Fight For Love	
2008	The Saturdays	"Vulnerable"	Chasing Lights
