= Real Talk =

Real Talk may refer to:

- "Real Talk" (R. Kelly song), a song by singer-songwriter R. Kelly on his eighth solo studio album
- Real Talk (Fabolous album)
- Real Talk (Lecrae album)
- Real Talk (Man Overboard album), debut record by pop punk band Man Overboard
- Real Talk (Konshens album)
- Real Talk (Philippine talk show), a lifestyle talk show in the Philippines
- Real Talk Entertainment, a hip hop record label

== See also ==
- Real Talk 2000, an album by 3X Krazy
