= Love This Life (disambiguation) =

"Love This Life" is a song by rapper T.I.

Love This Life may also refer to:

- "Love This Life", a song by Slave to the System from Slave to the System
- "Love This Life", a song by Crowded House from Temple of Low Men
- "Love This Life", a song by Konshens from Mental Maintenance
- "Love This Life", a song by Paul Colman Trio
- "Love This Life", a song by Bosson from Future's Gone Tomorrow / Life Is Here Today
