= Hazul =

Portuguese graffiti and street artist

- Style: Street art
- Website: www.hazul.pt

Hazul is a Portuguese graffiti and street artist, born in 1981 in Porto, Portugal. He began writing graffiti under the pseudonym “Pong 02” in 1997 at age 16. He is a self-taught artist who developed his signature abstract styles working on Porto’s streets.

== Biography ==
Hazul started painting in the street in 1997, at the age of 16. Hazul is one of Porto's most prominent street artists. In 2015 he published "Mapa Hazul", a script with dozens of murals that he made in the city of Porto.

Though his work has been mostly focused in his home city, he has also had some exposure internationally, particularly in Paris, where he has painted many murals and exhibited his works in group and solo shows. A number of his commissioned murals are now considered landmarks in Porto, particularly his pieces by Trindade metro station and Estádio do Dragão, home of FC Porto.

The distinctive style of his work is a very familiar sight around the streets of Porto. Hazul’s work is characterised by cubist-inspired geometric forms, muted palettes, and faceless figures, which are intended to portray anonymity and universality.

The municipality of Porto's anti-graffiti department often preserves his works, rather than removing them.

In 2024 his profile was featured on TV5Monde's street art show "Sur Les Murs", hosted by Richard Orlinski

== Public works and commissions ==
Among Hazul’s major commissions is the 2018 mural at Estádio do Dragão, created for FC Porto’s 125th anniversary. He also produced works for the Le Mur project in Nancy, France, in December 2018. In January 2019 he painted the “Mapa-Múndi” mural in Porto’s Carvalhido quarter.

== Exhibitions ==
- 2019, Prism – Le Cabinet D'amateur, Paris
- 2019, Raiz – DaVinci Art Gallery, Porto
- 2016, Epopeia – DaVinci Art Gallery, Porto
- 2015, Turquesa – REM Espaço Arte, Porto
- 2014, Prisma – Galeria Geraldes da Silva, Porto
- 2014, Sinergia – Galeria Metamorfose, Porto
- 2013, Cúbica – Galeria Almadas, Porto
