= Policeman (song) =

Single by Eva Simons featuring Konshens
- Released: 10 April 2015
- Recorded: 2014
- Genre: Dancehall; moombahton
- Length: 3:14
- Label: Powerhouse
- Songwriters: Eva Simons; Sidney Samson
- Producers: Konshens; Sidney Samson; Eva Simons

Eva Simons singles chronology
"This Girl" (2014)	"Policeman" (2015)	"Bludfire" (2016)

Konshens singles chronology
"Want Dem All" (2013)	"Policeman" (2015)	"Gal Ting" (2015)

"Policeman" is a song performed by Dutch singer Eva Simons, featuring Jamaican dancehall artist Konshens. The song was released on 10 April 2015, followed by a music video. The song was produced by Sidney Samson, who worked with her on her previous single, "Celebrate the Rain". On 6 November 2015 a remix with Faydee was released.

The song is included in the 2019 dance rhythm video game Just Dance 2020.

== Track listing ==
Digital Download
No.	Title	Length
1.	"Policeman"	3:14

Extended version
No.	Title	Length
1.	"Policeman" (Original Mix)	4:09

== Charts ==
=== Weekly charts ===
Chart (2015)	Peak position
Austria (Ö3 Austria Top 40)	60
Belgium (Ultratop 50 Flanders)	5
Belgium Urban (Ultratop Flanders)	1
Belgium (Ultratop 50 Wallonia)	9
France (SNEP)	12
France Airplay (SNEP)	4
Israel International Airplay (Media Forest)	1
Germany (GfK)	49
Netherlands (Single Top 100)	7
Netherlands (Dutch Top 40)	10
Suriname (Nationale Top 40)	1

=== Year-end charts ===
Chart (2015)	Position
Belgium (Ultratop Flanders)	29
Belgium (Ultratop Wallonia)	74
France (SNEP)	96
Netherlands (Dutch Top 40)	42
Netherlands (Single Top 100)	29

== Certifications ==
Region	Certification	Certified units/sales
Belgium (BRMA)	Gold	15,000^{*}
Denmark (IFPI Danmark)	Gold	45,000^{‡}
Germany (BVMI)	Gold	200,000^{‡}
Netherlands (NVPI)	Platinum	30,000^{‡}
^{*} Sales figures based on certification alone.^{‡} Sales+streaming figures based on certification alone.
