= Double Up (R. Kelly album) =

Studio album by R. Kelly
- Released: May 29, 2007
- Genres: R&B; hip hop
- Length: 76:19
- Labels: Jive; Zomba; Sony BMG
- Producers: R. Kelly; Polow da Don; Khao; Lil' Ronnie; Mysto & Pizzi; The Runners

R. Kelly chronology
| TP.3 Reloaded (2005) | Double Up (2007) | Untitled (2009) |

Singles from Double Up
- 1. "I'm a Flirt (Remix)" Released: March 2, 2007; 2. "Same Girl" Released: May 29, 2007 (US), August 24, 2007 (Germany); 3. "Rock Star" Released: October 2, 2007

Double Up is the eighth studio album by American singer-songwriter R. Kelly. It was released by Jive Records on May 29, 2007 in the United States, with distribution handled by Zomba Label Group. The album features the contributions with guest appearances and also the productions, which was handled by R. Kelly, along with Swizz Beatz, The Runners, Snoop Dogg, Khao, Nelly, Chamillionaire and Polow da Don.

Its lead single, his remix to "I'm a Flirt", which features guest vocals from American rapper T.I. and American recording artist T-Pain; attaining the prominence of the success on the Billboard's Top 40 charts, while it peaked at number one on the US Top Hot Rap Tracks chart. Double Up is Kelly's final studio album to top the Billboard 200.

== Background ==
On YouTube, R. Kelly has a video of him speaking out about his state on his success and his thoughts of collaborating with artists, such Young Jeezy and Ludacris, he thought, "why not put some of that magic on my album?" He stated that 70 percent of the record will be uptempo but he assured fans that "there will be some slow jams on there."

== Promotion and release ==
Prior to the album's release, three songs were leaked onto the Internet: second single "Same Girl", which features Usher; "Rise Up", a song which only appeared on some releases, a tribute to the victims of the Virginia Tech massacre in April 2007; also making an early appearance was a song titled "Blow It Up", at first supposed to be featured on the album but absent from the final track listing, mainly due to the inappropriate mood it would have created because of the presence of the Virginia Tech shooting tribute song "Rise Up". "Rock Star", which features Ludacris and Kid Rock, was released as the album's third single on September 4. A video for the song "Real Talk" was also made directly on YouTube. On May 25, 2007, four days before the album's release, the explicit version of the album became available for purchase on iTunes. The edited version became available on May 29, 2007, with a bonus track version available a day later.

== Critical reception ==
Professional ratings
Aggregate scores
| Source | Rating |
|---|---|
| Metacritic | 63/100 |
Review scores
| Source | Rating |
| AllMusic | 4/5 stars |
| Entertainment Weekly | C |
| New York Post | 3/4 stars |
| Pitchfork | 6.7/10 |
| PopMatters | 7/10 |
| Robert Christgau | (choice cut) |
| Rolling Stone | 3/5 stars |
| Slant Magazine | 1/5 stars |
| Yahoo! Music UK | 4/10 |

Double Up received positive reviews from critics. At Metacritic, which assigns a normalized rating out of 100 to reviews from mainstream critics, Chromatica has an average score of 63 based on 15 reviews. AllMusic editor K. Ross Hoffman remarked that when Kelly "sticks to his somehow perennially fresh style of lush, laid-back, semi-organic, mid-tempo grooves, he's both unmistakable and untouchable. Even the album's parade of A-list guest stars, though it does help to keep things interesting, never threatens to overshadow the musical and vocal smoothness, and perversely compelling lyricism of the main event." Nathan Rabin felt that on the album "Kelly routinely cooks up killer grooves that make his exuberantly stupid lyrics and hackneyed song concepts seem strangely charming [...] Double Up boasts its share of filler, and it seldom strays from self-parody." Pitchfork's Ryan Dombal wrote: "Kelly sometimes sounds like a man too old for the club but too stubborn and horny to turn away. Thankfully, he's somewhat aware of this predicament; the singer mines humor as a hapless rube."

Dan Aquailante from The New York Post found that "Kelly's too-many-words-for-one-sentence singing is at full power [...] Still, with this many songs it was impossible for Kelly to maintain excellence for the whole album." Entertainment Weekly's Chris Willman felt "there are moments of such supersonically unhinged sexual mania on Double Up — his ninth and horniest album — that you can only conclude that the guy who brought you the nutso R&B opera "Trapped in the Closet" has completely lost whatever was left of his dirty mind." Writing for The New York Times, Kelefa Sanneh called Double Up "the most cocksure album of his career." She found that it was a "nutty album, but a pretty single-minded one." Alexis Petridis from The Guardian conluded: "The reaction Double Up provokes makes you think of the scene from The Producers when the opening night performance of Springtime for Hitler ends and the camera pans on to the audience: open-mouthed, frozen, aghast." Billboard editor Gail Mitchell noted that "it's a very sexually explicit R. Kelly who greets fans on this outing." while Robert Christgau, writing for Rolling Stone, found that the album "piles on the bump'n'grind."

== Chart performance ==
Double Up debuted at number one on the US Billboard 200, with first-week sales of 386,000 copies, making this Kelly's sixth and final album in his career to debut at number-one. To date, the album has sold 1,200,000 copies in the United States. On June 3, 2007 it entered the UK Albums Chart at number 10.

== Track listing ==
| No. | Title | Writer(s) | Producer(s) | Length |
|---|---|---|---|---|
| 1. | "The Champ" (featuring Swizz Beatz) | Robert Kelly, Kasseem Dean | Kelly, The Runners (co.) | 1:50 |
| 2. | "Double Up" (featuring Snoop Dogg) | Kelly, Calvin Broadus, Jr., C. Bereal, K. Bereal, C. Brockman, C. Keyes, N. Stewart | Kelly, Khao (co.) | 4:48 |
| 3. | "Tryin to Get a Number" (featuring Nelly) | Kelly, C. Haynes | Corey "Keyz" Martin | 3:47 |
| 4. | "Get Dirty" (featuring Chamillionaire) | R. Kelly, H. Seriki | R. Kelly, Mysto & Pizzi (co.) | 3:56 |
| 5. | "Leave Your Name" | R. Kelly | R. Kelly | 3:27 |
| 6. | "Freaky in the Club" | R. Kelly | R. Kelly | 4:35 |
| 7. | "The Zoo" | R. Kelly | R. Kelly | 3:39 |
| 8. | "I'm a Flirt (Remix)" (featuring T.I. and T-Pain) | R. Kelly, S. Moss, R. Jackson, C. Harris, F. Najm | Lil' Ronnie | 5:32 |
| 9. | "Same Girl" (duet with Usher) | R. Kelly | R. Kelly, Lil' Ronnie (co.) | 4:12 |
| 10. | "Real Talk" | R. Kelly | R. Kelly | 3:00 |
| 11. | "Hook It Up" (featuring Huey) | R. Kelly, L. Franks Jr. | R. Kelly, Lil' Ronnie (co.) | 4:15 |
| 12. | "Rock Star" (featuring Ludacris and Kid Rock) | R. Kelly, C. Bridges | R. Kelly | 4:47 |
| 13. | "Best Friend" (featuring Keyshia Cole and Polow da Don) | R. Kelly | R. Kelly, Polow da Don (co.) | 4:41 |
| 14. | "Rollin'" | R. Kelly | R. Kelly | 4:47 |
| 15. | "Sweet Tooth" | R. Kelly | R. Kelly | 2:50 |
| 16. | "Havin a Baby" | R. Kelly | R. Kelly | 3:34 |
| 17. | "Sex Planet" | R. Kelly | R. Kelly | 5:35 |
| 18. | "Rise Up" (Virginia Tech Memorial tribute track; not included on releases outside of North America) | R. Kelly | R. Kelly | 3:31 |

Bonus/hidden tracks
| No. | Title | Writer(s) | Producer(s) | Length |
|---|---|---|---|---|
| 19. | "Ringtone" (iTunes bonus track / physical hidden track) | R. Kelly, J. Jones, W. Hodge | R. Kelly, Polow da Don | 3:41 |
| 20. | "I Like Love" (Japan / United Kingdom bonus track) | R. Kelly | R. Kelly | 3:20 |
| 21. | "Ooh Baby" (iTunes bonus track) | R. Kelly | R. Kelly | 3:38 |
| 22. | "Good Sex" (featuring Twista) (iTunes bonus track) | R. Kelly, A. Harr, J. Jackson, C. Mitchell | R. Kelly, The Runners | 3:40 |

Samples credits

- "Double Up" samples "Iceberg" performed by Tweet

Notes

- There are different iTunes versions of Double Up. Some features the track "Ringtone", as track 19; instead of 20 as on the physical version of the album. Other versions have "I Like Love" or the video for "I'm a Flirt" as bonus features.
- On all versions (digital and CD) of Double Up, "I'm a Flirt" is presented in its censored form while the other songs are not.
- On most international versions of the album, the song "Rise Up" is omitted in favor of the aforementioned bonus tracks. The song "Rise Up" was reportedly intended predominantly for North American listeners because it is about the Virginia Tech massacre, something that some non-North American fans of R. Kelly may be unfamiliar with.
- The extended version of the song "Get Dirty" with an extended verse by Chamillionaire was released on R. Kelly's MySpace page.

== Chart positions ==
=== Weekly charts ===
| Chart (2007) | Peak position |
|---|---|
| Australian Albums (ARIA) | 101 |
| Belgian Albums (Ultratop Wallonia) | 74 |
| Canadian Albums (Billboard) | 19 |
| Dutch Albums (Album Top 100) | 34 |
| German Albums (Offizielle Top 100) | 46 |
| Italian Albums (FIMI) | 62 |
| Swedish Albums (Sverigetopplistan) | 37 |
| Swiss Albums (Schweizer Hitparade) | 39 |
| UK Albums (Official Charts) | 10 |
| US Billboard 200 | 1 |
| US Digital Albums (Billboard) | 4 |
| US Top R&B/Hip-Hop Albums (Billboard) | 1 |

=== Year-end charts ===
| Chart (2007) | Position |
|---|---|
| US Billboard 200 | 50 |
| US Top R&B/Hip-Hop Albums (Billboard) | 9 |

== Certifications ==
| Region | Certification | Certified units/sales |
|---|---|---|
| United States (RIAA) | Platinum | 1,200,000 |

== See also ==
- List of Billboard 200 number-one albums of 2007
- List of Billboard number-one R&B/hip-hop albums of 2007
