= Take Over Control =

- US cover

Single by Afrojack featuring Eva Simons
- Released: 12 August 2010
- Recorded: 2010
- Genre: Electro house; progressive house
- Length: 6:56
- Label: Spinnin'; Ministry of Sound; Robbins Entertainment
- Songwriters: Afrojack; Mike Hamilton; Eva Simons; Ingrid Simons
- Producer: Afrojack

Afrojack singles chronology
"A Msterdamn" (2010)	"Take Over Control" (2010)	"Give Me Everything" (2011)

Eva Simons singles chronology
"Silly Boy" (2009)	"Take Over Control" (2010)	"I Don't Like You" (2012)

Alternative cover
- UK cover

Wall Recordings cover
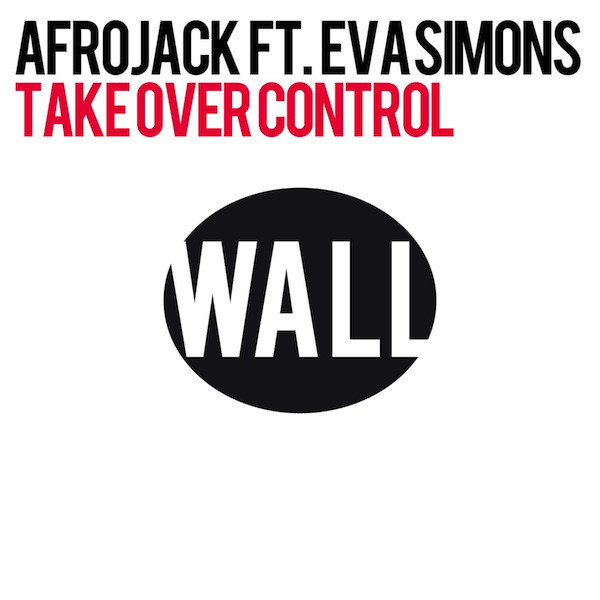

Audio sample
- "Take Over Control": file; help

"Take Over Control" is a song by Dutch producer and DJ Afrojack, featuring vocals from Dutch singer Eva Simons. The song was written by Afrojack, Mike Hamilton, Simons and Ingrid Simons. It was released as a single in the Netherlands on 12 August 2010. The song was a number-one single for six weeks on Billboard's Dance/Mix Show Airplay. The song is also Afrojack's first single ever to enter the Billboard Hot 100, peaking at number 41.

== Music video ==
The music video, directed by Alex Herron, was shot on 14 September 2010 in Los Angeles and Death Valley, California. The video premiered on YouTube on 12 October 2010 through the Spinnin' Records account, and later shown to the British public on 20 October 2010 through the Data Records account.

The video starts with Afrojack driving an Audi R8 in the Mojave Desert. Simons, depicted as a robotic dancer in a quite stereotypical yellow American school bus, is accompanied by four robotic background dancers. They step out of the bus and perform a high-energy dance routine in a desert aircraft boneyard, with Simons framed in an L-1011 Rolls-Royce RB211 engine. The girls take control of the field but fall out of energy, and Afrojack arrives and plugs them in so they can keep performing.

== Track listings and formats ==
- Digital download
1. "Take Over Control" (Radio Edit) – 3:28
2. "Take Over Control" (Extended Vocal Mix) – 6:56
- Digital maxi single
1. "Take Over Control" (Radio Edit) – 3:28
2. "Take Over Control" (Extended Vocal Mix) – 6:56
3. "Take Over Control" (Extended Vocal Instrumental) – 6:56
- UK digital EP
1. "Take Over Control" (UK Radio Edit) – 2:57
2. "Take Over Control" (Adam F. Vocal Edit) – 2:53
3. "Take Over Control" (Extended Vocal Mix) – 6:56
4. "Take Over Control" (Ian Carey Remix) – 6:47
5. "Take Over Control" (Adam F. Remix) – 3:37
6. "Take Over Control" (Drumsound & Bassline Smith Mix) – 3:46
- UK single
1. "Take Over Control" (UK Radio Edit) – 2:57
2. "Take Over Control" (Adam F. Vocal Edit) – 2:53
- US CD maxi single
1. "Take Over Control" (Radio Edit) – 3:38
2. "Take Over Control" (Dutch Radio Edit) – 3:28
3. "Take Over Control" (Extended Vocal Mix) – 6:56
4. "Take Over Control" (Adam F. Mix) – 3:34
5. "Take Over Control" (Drumsound & Bassline Smith Mix) – 3:44
6. "Take Over Control" (Spencer & Hill Mix) – 6:10
7. "Take Over Control" (Apster Mix) – 5:34
8. "Take Over Control" (Sunnery James & Ryan Marciano Mix) – 6:08
9. "Take Over Control" (Ian Carey Mix) – 6:45
10. "Take Over Control" (Dj Fuel Mix) – 3:57

== Charts ==
=== Weekly charts ===
Chart (2010–11)	Peak position
Australia (ARIA)	17
Austria (Ö3 Austria Top 40)	46
Belgium (Ultratip Bubbling Under Flanders)	7
Belgium (Ultratip Bubbling Under Wallonia)	9
Brazil (Hot 100 Airplay)	21
Brazil (Hot Pop Songs)	10
Canada Hot 100 (Billboard)	39
CIS Airplay (TopHit)	12
Czech Republic Airplay (ČNS IFPI)	31
Germany (GfK)	78
Hungary (Rádiós Top 40)	18
Hungary (Dance Top 40)	1
Netherlands (Dutch Top 40)	12
Netherlands (Single Top 100)	12
Poland (Polish Airplay TV)	4
Poland (Dance Top 50)	1
Russia Airplay (TopHit)	13
Scottish Singles Sales (Official Charts)	11
UK Singles (Official Charts)	24
UK Dance (Official Charts)	3
UK Indie (Official Charts)	2
US Billboard Hot 100	41
US Dance Club Songs (Billboard)	23
US Dance Airplay (Billboard)	1
US Hot Latin Songs (Billboard)	42
US Pop Airplay (Billboard)	24
US Rhythmic Airplay (Billboard)	27
US Tropical Airplay (Billboard)	22

=== Year-end charts ===
Chart (2010)	Position
Netherlands (Dutch Top 40)	92
Netherlands (Single Top 100)	81
Hungary (Dance Top 40)	33
Hungary (Rádiós Top 40)	74
Chart (2011)	Position
Australia (ARIA)	96
Hungary (Dance Top 40)	7
Russia Airplay (TopHit)	72
US Dance/Mix Show Airplay (Billboard)	2

== Certifications ==
Region	Certification	Certified units/sales
Australia (ARIA)	2× Platinum	140,000^{‡}
United Kingdom (BPI)	Silver	200,000^{‡}
United States (RIAA)	Platinum	1,000,000^{*}
^{*} Sales figures based on certification alone.^{‡} Sales+streaming figures based on certification alone.

== Release history ==
Region	Date	Format	Label
Netherlands	12 August 2010	Digital download	Spinnin' Records
Belgium	10 September 2010	Digital download	Spinnin' Records
United States	5 October 2010	Digital download	Robbins Entertainment
Germany	5 November 2010	CD single	Tiger Records
United States	16 November 2010	CD single	Robbins Entertainment
United Kingdom	28 November 2010	Digital download	Ministry of Sound
United Kingdom	29 November 2010	CD single	Ministry of Sound
