= This Is Love (will.i.am song) =

Single by will.i.am featuring Eva Simons

from the album #willpower
- Released: May 14, 2012
- Recorded: 2011–12
- Genre: Dance-pop; hip house; electro house
- Length: 4:42 (album version); 4:07 (radio edit)
- Label: will.i.am; Interscope
- Songwriters: Eva Simons; William Adams; Steve Angello; Sebastian Ingrosso; Max Martin; Mike Hamilton
- Producers: will.i.am; Steve Angello; Sebastian Ingrosso

will.i.am singles chronology
"Great Times" (2011)	"This Is Love" (2012)	"Hall of Fame" (2012)

Eva Simons singles chronology
"I Don't Like You" (2012)	"This Is Love" (2012)	"Chemistry" (2013)

Music video
- "This Is Love" on YouTube

"This Is Love" is a song written and recorded by American hip hop artist will.i.am for his fourth studio album, #willpower. The song features vocals from Dutch singer-songwriter Eva Simons. "This Is Love" was released as the lead single from #willpower on June 1, 2012, and the song made its debut on Capital FM on May 14, 2012. The music video, directed by will.i.am himself, was released on May 25, 2012.

== Background and development ==
The song was co-produced by Swedish House Mafia DJ's, Steve Angello and Sebastian Ingrosso. Work on the song started in late December 2011, and was partially recorded and completely mixed outside of the recording studios, on will.i.am's personal laptop. Eva Simons, whose vocals are featured on "This Is Love", was personally asked by will.i.am himself to lend vocals to the song. Simons told MTV News,

"He is super creative, and we kind of have the same energy: We can't sit still. We were in the studio, and he had this track, and he's like, 'Yo, Eva, would you like to do this song with me?' And we had been recording a couple tracks before, so he knows what I'm capable of and he trusts me, and we don't really know each other for that long, but he trusts me. I recorded it, and he mixes it straight away from his laptop ... and it's done. That's so beautiful — not only is he super creative and knows what he wants, but he also sees when other people are creative as well. He's not afraid to collaborate."

== Music video ==
will.i.am and his grand piano on the South Bank accompanied by a laptop, displaying shots of the night club.

The music video for "This Is Love" was shot in London, United Kingdom, with part of it shot at Potter's Fields on the South Bank of the Thames near Tower Bridge, in mid-May. It was released via VEVO on May 25, 2012.

The music video starts with will.i.am playing a Grand Piano on the grass on the south bank of the Thames near Tower Bridge, engraved with the brand new #willpower era style will.i.am logo. He is accompanied by a laptop, displaying pictures of a nightclub (Cirque Le Soir in Soho, with Eva Simons appearing inside. During Simons' bridges and choruses, the video crosses to the nightclub, displaying pictures of the club in action, Simons and Adams inside singing their respective verses. Over time, the video crosses back and forth between will.i.am at South Bank and Eva Simons inside the night club. It ends with both Adams and Simons at South Bank, with a group of violinists during the final chorus and pyrotechnic displays during Simons' final vocal chorus.

== Track listing ==
Digital download
No.	Title	Length
1.	"This Is Love"	4:42

Digital EP
No.	Title	Length
1.	"This Is Love" (Radio Edit)	4:07
2.	"This Is Love" (Album Version)	4:42
3.	"This Is Love" (Radio Instrumental)	4:07
4.	"This Is Love" (3D M4n Remix)	4:07

== Chart and sales performance ==
The song is the first solo track by will.i.am to reach number one in the United Kingdom, where it sold 102,000 copies in its first week on sale. The song has sold 403,000 copies in the UK in 2012, and was the 39th best-selling single of 2012. It has reached the top-ten in 17 countries worldwide, whilst reaching number one in 10 of those.

== Charts ==
=== Weekly charts ===
Weekly chart performance for "This Is Love"
Chart (2012–13)	Peak position
Australia (ARIA)	7
Australia Dance (ARIA)	1
Austria (Ö3 Austria Top 40)	15
Belgium (Ultratop 50 Flanders)	1
Belgium (Ultratop 50 Wallonia)	2
Canada Hot 100 (Billboard)	14
CIS Airplay (TopHit)	8
Czech Republic Airplay (ČNS IFPI)	15
Denmark (Tracklisten)	23
Finland (Suomen virallinen lista)	1
France (SNEP)	2
Germany (GfK)	54
Honduras (Honduras Top 50)	25
Hungary (Dance Top 40)	4
Hungary (Rádiós Top 40)	1
Ireland (IRMA)	1
Italy (FIMI)	23
Lebanon (The Official Lebanese Top 20)	2
Luxembourg Digital Song Sales (Billboard)	3
Netherlands (Dutch Top 40)	1
Netherlands (Single Top 100)	2
New Zealand (Recorded Music NZ)	5
Norway (VG-lista)	1
Poland Airplay (ZPAV)	3
Poland (Top 5 Video Airplay)	1
Portugal Digital Songs (Billboard)	1
Romania (Romanian Top 100)	24
Russia Airplay (TopHit)	9
Scotland Singles (Official Charts)	1
Slovakia Airplay (ČNS IFPI)	1
Spain (Promusicae)	9
Sweden (Sverigetopplistan)	10
Switzerland (Schweizer Hitparade)	8
UK Singles (Official Charts)	1
Ukraine Airplay (TopHit)	55
US Bubbling Under Hot 100 (Billboard)	10
US Dance Club Songs (Billboard)	4

=== Year-end charts ===
2012 year-end chart performance for "This Is Love"
Chart (2012)	Position
Australia (ARIA)	80
Belgium (Ultratop Flanders)	27
Belgium (Ultratop Wallonia)	27
Hungary (Dance Top 40)	28
Hungary (Rádiós Top 40)	23
Italy (FIMI)	86
Netherlands (Dutch Top 40)	7
Netherlands (Single Top 100)	23
Poland (ZPAV)	5
Russia Airplay (TopHit)	40
Sweden (Sverigetopplistan)	48
Switzerland (Schweizer Hitparade)	67
Ukraine Airplay (TopHit)	127
UK Singles (OCC)	39

2013 year-end chart performance for "This Is Love"
Chart (2013)	Position
Hungary (Dance Top 40)	94

== Certifications ==
Certificatons for "This Is Love"
Region	Certification	Certified units/sales
Australia (ARIA)	2× Platinum	140,000^{^}
Belgium (BRMA)	Gold	15,000^{*}
Italy (FIMI)	Gold	15,000^{*}
New Zealand (RMNZ)	Platinum	15,000^{*}
Switzerland (IFPI Switzerland)	Gold	15,000^{^}
United Kingdom (BPI)	Platinum	600,000^{‡}
Streaming
Denmark (IFPI Danmark)	2× Platinum	3,600,000^{†}
^{*} Sales figures based on certification alone.^{^} Shipments figures based on certification alone.^{‡} Sales+streaming figures based on certification alone.^{†} Streaming-only figures based on certification alone.

== Release history ==
Release dates for "This Is Love"
Country	Date	Format	Ref.
United Kingdom	May 14, 2012	Radio (premiere)	
Australia	June 1, 2012	Digital download	
Sweden	June 1, 2012	Digital download	
New Zealand	June 1, 2012	Digital download	
United States	June 18, 2012	Top 40/Mainstream radio	
United Kingdom	June 24, 2012	Digital download	
Ireland	June 24, 2012	Digital download	
United States	June 26, 2012	Rhythmic radio	
United States	July 3, 2012	Digital download	
Germany	August 3, 2012	Digital download	
