= Sur Les Murs =

French documentary television series

- Genre: Documentary / Street art
- Presented by: Richard Orlinski
- Country of origin: France
- Original language: French
- No. of seasons: 3
- No. of episodes: 45

Original release
- Network: TV5Monde
- Release: 2021 – present

Sur les murs is a French street-art documentary series hosted by sculptor and artist Richard Orlinski on TV5Monde. Part of the series' objectives is to examine the state of street art culture in the post-COVID world. Each episode includes an original interview with a French-speaking street artist and the creation of a collaborative piece. Artists featured include up-and-coming talents as well as established street artists from different cities around the world.

== Series overview ==
Season	Episodes	Originally released	
Season	Episodes	First released	Last released
1	5	2021	2021
2	20	2022	2023
3	20	2023	2024

== Episodes ==
=== Season 1 ===
No. overall	No. in season	Title	Artists Featured
1	1	"Géométrie"	Tim Zdey, Jordane Saget
2	2	"Les femmes qui peignent les femmes"	Fafinettes de Fafi, Lady Jday
3	3	"Les nouvelles technologies au service de l'art"	Xavier Magaldi, Marc-Olivier Lamothe
4	4	"Les couleurs"	Le Mouvement collective, Dalkhafine
5	5	"Les héritiers du graffiti"	Grems, Marko93

=== Season 2 ===
No. overall	No. in season	Title	Artists Featured
1	6	"Biarritz (1)"	Grems, Nils Inne
2	7	"Biarritz (2)"	Fafi, José Delgado
3	8	"Stockholm (1)"	Holem, R-Line
4	9	"Stockholm (2)"	Huge, Martin
5	10	"Paris (1)"	Jordane Saget, Chanoir
6	11	"Paris (2)"	Mademoiselle Maurice
7	12	"Saint-Denis (1)"	Tim Zdey, Najete Kada
8	13	"Saint-Denis (2)"	Marko93, Nayra
9	14	"Genève (1)"	Xavier Magaldi, Perla
10	15	"Genève (2)"	SWALT, Jams One
11	16	"Athènes (1)"	Billy Gee
12	17	"Athènes (2)"	Cacaorocks
13	18	"Montréal (1)"	Dalkhafine
14	19	"Montréal (2)"	Marc-Olivier Lamothe
15	20	"New York (1)"	Moi One
16	21	"New York (2)"	Lady Jday, Hugus
17	22	"Tel-Aviv (1)"	Daniel Siboni
18	23	"Tel-Aviv (2)"	Dan Groover
19	24	"Bruxelles (1)"	Anthea Missy
20	25	"Bruxelles (2)"	Jaune

=== Season 3 ===
No. overall	No. in season	Title	Artists Featured
1	26	"Ivry"	Stew
2	27	"Aubervilliers"	Jo Di Bona
3	28	"Paris 1"	Le Cyklop
4	29	"Paris 2"	Diamond Cutter
5	30	"Valence 1"	Stillo Noir
6	31	"Valence 2"	Miedo12
7	32	"Bruxelles 1"	Samuel Idmtal, Toner2
8	33	"Bruxelles 2"	Patrick Croes, Stephan Goldrajch
9	34	"Nice 1"	César Malfi, Artmor1
10	35	"Nice 2"	Mulia, Tina de Rubia
11	36	"Luxembourg 1"	Sumo, Sader
12	37	"Luxembourg 2"	Raphael Gindt, Thomas Iser
13	38	"Lausanne 1"	KVALEE, CRBZ
14	39	"Lausanne 2"	AWOE, César Bilavie
15	40	"Tokyo 1"	Harry Kazan, Jeremy Yamamura
16	41	"Tokyo 2"	Geoffrey Bouillot, Stephan Leroux
17	42	"Séoul 1"	Storm, Boyane
18	43	"Séoul 2"	Daniel Ahifon, Bruno Tao
19	44	"Porto 1"	BerriBlue, Hazul
20	45	"Porto 2"	Nuno Costah, Sphiza
