= Same Girl (R. Kelly and Usher song) =

2007 single by R. Kelly and Usher

Single by R. Kelly and Usher

from the album Double Up
- Released: May 29, 2007
- Genre: R&B
- Length: 4:12
- Label: Jive
- Songwriters: R. Kelly; Ronnie Jackson; James Smith
- Producers: Lil' Ronnie; R. Kelly

R. Kelly singles chronology
"I'm a Flirt" (2007)	"Same Girl" (2007)	"Rock Star" (2007)

Usher singles chronology
"Caught Up" (2005)	"Same Girl" (2007)	"Love in This Club" (2008)

"Same Girl" is a song by American R&B singers R. Kelly and Usher from the former's 2007 album, Double Up. The song was recorded over a year by upcoming R&B group Nephu. R. Kelly and Usher's version leaked to the Internet on May 2, 2007, and later leaked to radio stations. This song was number 26 on Rolling Stone's list of the 100 Best Songs of 2007.

== Composition ==
According to the sheet music published by Universal Music Publishing Group, "Same Girl" is an R&B song set in a slow tempo of seventy beats per minute. Written in the key of E♭ minor, it follows the chord progression of A♭m–B♭m–E♭m, and both Kelly's and Usher's voices span from C_{3} to C_{5}.

== Music video ==
The video was shot from June 1–3, 2007 by Little X. On June 19, 2007, BET premiered the official music video for "Same Girl" and aired it throughout the day, every hour on the hour. It later premiered on the network's 106 & Park as a New Joint of the Day.

In the song, R. Kelly and Usher talk about a girl they love who turns out to be the same person. In the video, during the first verse, R. Kelly is seen in Chicago calling Usher at his home in Atlanta, telling him about a woman that he is in love with, sparing no details. Usher, taken aback by the similarities to the girl he is dating, inquires further about R.Kelly's new love interest and comes to the conclusion that she is, in fact, the "same girl" as R.Kelly's partner. R. Kelly, in an attempt to resolve the situation working together with Usher, flies out to meet up with Usher in the chorus. As the second verse begins, Usher picks up R. Kelly at the airport in an Aston Martin Vanquish and the two discuss the way they each met this girl in their respective home towns. Eventually, as the two play basketball together, they concoct a scheme to call this girl out on her lies, and show up at dinner with her together, thus shocking and embarrassing her by directly confronting her with her own duplicity. However, at the end of the video, as their plan is carried out, it is in fact Usher and R. Kelly who are shocked, as the tables are turned and it is revealed that they were not, in fact, dating the same girl as they had come to believe; the girl just happened to have an identical twin with an identical car, license plate, ankle tattoo, beauty mark, and child as well as an identical penchant for Waffle House despite living over 700 miles away from her sister; in addition, both possessed a blue and pink phone which they would alternate occasionally. Also, even though one lives in Chicago and the other in Atlanta, both amazingly live on streets of the same name (Peachtree, right on 17th Street). This is never actually stated in the song, though, so it is debatable whether this is also the case within the song itself. However, in the end of the video, they stare at each other dumbfounded as they realized the girl they thought they were both dating are actually identical twins.

== Remixed versions ==
The official remix of the song, The Triple Up Remix, features T-Pain and Usher. R. Kelly uses the Auto-Tune effect on the remix.

- "Same Girl" (featuring Usher and T-Pain) (Unofficial Mash-Up Remix)
- "Same Girl Triple Up" (Remix featuring Usher and T-Pain)

== Credits ==
- R. Kelly – vocals, writing, production, arrangement, mixing
- Ronnie Jackson (Lil' Ronnie) – writing, production
- J. Smith – writing
- Serban Ghenea – mixing
- Abel Garibaldi, Ian Mereness, Jeff Edwards – recording engineer
- Jeff Meeks, Tim Roberts – assistant
- John Hanes – digital editing
- Usher – vocals

== Charts ==
=== Weekly charts ===
Chart (2007)	Peak position
Australia (ARIA)	47
Australian Urban (ARIA)	12
Ireland (IRMA)	20
Netherlands (Dutch Top 40 Tipparade)	12
New Zealand (Recorded Music NZ)	4
Scotland Singles (OCC)	19
UK Singles (OCC)	26
UK Hip Hop/R&B (OCC)	5
US Billboard Hot 100	20
US Digital Song Sales (Billboard)	38
US Hot R&B/Hip-Hop Songs (Billboard)	4
US Pop 100 (Billboard)	49
US Rhythmic Airplay (Billboard)	22

=== Year-end charts ===
Chart (2007)	Position
New Zealand (RIANZ)	20
US Billboard Hot 100	100
US Hot R&B/Hip-Hop Songs (Billboard)	22

== Certifications ==
Region	Certification	Certified units/sales
Australia (ARIA)	Gold	35,000^{‡}
New Zealand (RMNZ)	Platinum	30,000^{‡}
United States (RIAA)	Gold	500,000^{*}
^{*} Sales figures based on certification alone.^{‡} Sales+streaming figures based on certification alone.
