= Chemistry (Eva Simons song) =

Song by Eva Simons

Single by Eva Simons
- Released: 20 March 2013
- Recorded: 2012
- Length: 3:30
- Label: Interscope
- Songwriter(s): Eva Simons; Rashelle Davies; Morten Schjolin; Benjamin Pedersen
- Producer(s): Kid Massive

Eva Simons singles chronology
"This Is Love" (2012)	"Chemistry" (2013)	"Celebrate the Rain" (2014)

Music video
- "Chemistry" on YouTube

"Chemistry" is a song by Dutch recording artist Eva Simons. It was released in the Netherlands on 20 March 2013. Although song did not achieve the same commercial and critical success as the earlier singles, it did climb to number 28 and spend 5 weeks on the Dutch Top 40 charts. The song was used in a Pepsi ad campaign in the Netherlands which gave customers a chance to meet Simons when she performed on Beyoncé's The Mrs. Carter Show World Tour.

== Track listing and formats ==
- Digital download
1. "Chemistry" - 3:30

== Charts ==
Chart (2013)	Peak position	Weeks
Dutch Top 40	28	5
Dutch Top 100	64	6

=== Year-end charts ===
Chart (2013)	Position
Netherlands (Dutch Top 40)	159
