= Silly Boy (Eva Simons song) =

2009 single by Eva Simons

Single by Eva Simons
- Released: 14 August 2009
- Recorded: 2008
- Genre: Dance-pop
- Length: 3:22
- Label: EMI Germany
- Songwriters: Tierce Alec-John Person; Mike Hamilton
- Producer: Tearce "Kizzo" Keaz

Eva Simons singles chronology
"Silly Boy" (2009)	"Take Over Control" (2010)

Music video
- "Silly Boy" on YouTube

"Silly Boy" is a 2009 electropop song recorded by Dutch recording artist Eva Simons. The song was released digitally on 31 July 2009, then on CD by EMI Music Germany on 4 and 14 September in Germany and Europe, respectively. It was released as a digital EP in the United Kingdom by Virgin Records that October.

== Background ==
"Silly Boy" was recorded by Simons and producer Tearce "Kizzo" Keaz in August 2008 and leaked on YouTube in April 2009. She was initially upset about the leak but said she was thankful for helping it gain exposure. She later shared that while it was "cool to hear [her] song on the internet" at first, getting credit for the song was difficult. Billy Mann from EMI said the song "capture[d] her fabulous energy and strength of personality."

The music video, directed by Micky Suelzer and Daniel Warwick, premiered on 30 July 2009 on both Simons' website and YouTube. The video shows Simons styling a large hairdo and a wearing a silver sparkly outfit during dance scenes, an outfit covered with plastic straws and a black jumpsuit during car scenes. Throughout the video, Simons is shown in a corridor with letters spelling out her name, and dancing with a team of backup dancers during the chorus of the song. She is also shown in a car, which she later gets out of, slams the door of, and gets back into. The video features a very Disturbia-esque dance routine and Eva wears disco ball-themed clothing.

== Track listing ==
- CD single
1. "Silly Boy" (Original Version) — 3:27
2. "Silly Boy" (Acoustic Version) — 3:32
- Exclusive iTunes download bundle
1. "Silly Boy" (Original Version) — 3:27
2. "Silly Boy" (Acoustic Version) — 3:32
3. "Silly Boy" (Dave Audé Radio Version) — 4:04
4. "Silly Boy" (Richard Vission Solmatic Mix) — 5:45

== Critical reception ==
Nick Levine of media website Digital Spy gave the single a positive review and 5/5 stars stating: "Thankfully, the track itself is worth every little scrap of fuss. With its zapping synths, rock guitars, booming beats, spiky lyrics and planet-sized chorus, it's a whopper of a song - pop on steroids. As for Simons, her ballsy attitude matches the bombastic production and the hairdo she rocks in the video makes Elly Jackson look like a chicken with the styling wax. The result? The most striking pop debut since 'Just Dance'." Paul Lester of The Guardian stated that he thought the song was not up to much, but the producer deserves a medal. He also compared the song to Lady Gaga's single "Poker Face".

== Charts ==
Chart (2009)	Peak position
Australian ARIA Singles Chart	45
Austria Singles Chart	55
Belgium Ultratip Chart (Flanders)	12
Czech Airplay Chart	39
Dutch Top 40	13
German Singles Chart	36
Slovenian Airplay Chart	50
Swedish Singles Chart	51
UK Singles Chart	149
