= Heartbeat (Richard Orlinski and Eva Simons song) =

Single by Richard Orlinski and Eva Simons
- Released: September 2016
- Genre: Dance
- Length: 3:03
- Songwriter(s): Ally Sereda; Jayme David Silverstein; Tefa; Sidney Samson; Eva Simons; Richard Orlinski

"Heartbeat" is a song by Richard Orlinski and Eva Simons released in 2016.

== Chart performance ==
=== Weekly charts ===
Chart (2016)	Peak position
France (SNEP)	1
