= Konshens =

Jamaican dancehall singer

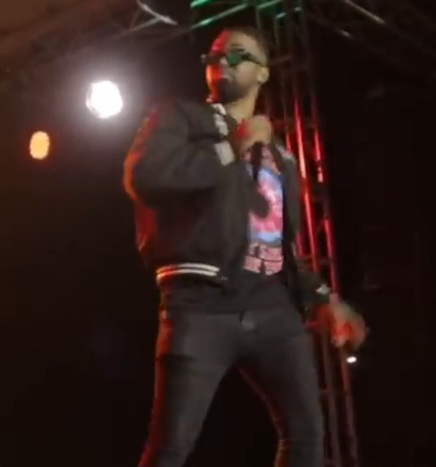
- Konshens performing in 2022

Background information
- Born: Garfield Delano Spence
- Origin: Kingston, Jamaica
- Genres: Dancehall; reggae
- Occupations: Singer; songwriter; businessman
- Years active: 2005–present
- Labels: subkonshus Music; Empire
- Website: konshensonline.com

Garfield Delano Spence, also known as Konshens, is a Jamaican dancehall singer.

== Biography ==
Prior to Spence's solo career, he was a member of the duo SoJah with his brother Delus . His hits have included "Winner", "Rasta Impostor", "This Means Money", "Good Girl Gone Bad", "Gal Dem a Talk", "Realest Song", "Represent", "Do Sumn" and "Forward", "Gal a bubble".

His 2005 single "Pon Di Corner" was a major hit in Japan, and led to a month-long tour of the country and a Japan-only album release.

He made a guest appearance on Tarrus Riley's Contagious album, deejaying on "Good Girl Gone Bad", which was also released as a single.

He has a large fanbase in Kenya, Trinidad and Tobago, Guyana and Europe, where his "Gal Dem Talk" single was a major hit, and he performed at Guyana's National Stadium in May 2011.

His album, Real Talk, was released by Japanese label Koyashi in 2010. A second album was also announced to be released in Jamaica on Tad Dawkins' Tad's International label. Konshens also launched his own label, Subkonshus, in 2010, working with new acts including his brother Delus.

In May 2011, he was one of several high-profile Jamaican celebrities to take part in a march in Torrington Park calling for an end to political rivalry in the area. The march commemorated a fire in May 1980 at the Eventide Home which killed over 150 elderly women which was suspected to be politically motivated arson.

In October 2011, his song Jamaican Dance was featured in the video game Just Dance 3.

In 2012, he released his second album, Mental Maintenance.

In 2013 his song "Gun Shot a Fire" was featured in the official soundtrack for the video game Grand Theft Auto V.

In March 2014, he became an official brand ambassador for Pepsi.

In April 2016 he released the single "Bruk Off Yuh Back" and a remix by Chris Brown was released in 2017. The single's music video garnered more than 160 million views on YouTube. In 2023 it was certified Silver in the UK by the British Phonographic Industry (BPI).

In July 2018, he was featured on I Don't Dance (Without You) with Matoma and Enrique Iglesias.

== Personal life ==
Spence married Latoya Wright in Miami, Florida, in November 2017. Spence has two children, Liam and Sajhi Spence

== Discography ==
=== Studio albums ===
- Real Talk (2010) (Japan only)
- Mental Maintenance (2012) dedicates to Nsubuga Pius Vianney
- Road Album (2014)
- It Feel Good (2018)
- RAW (2018)
- Badman vs Nice Guy (2019)
- Soca Virgin (2020)
- Red Reign (2021)

• Pool Party (Jun 2025)

=== Collaborative albums ===
- "Medi" (featuring Delus) Intouch Riddim (with Various Artists) (2008)

=== Singles ===
==== As lead artist ====
- "Pon Di Corner" (featuring Delus) (2005)
- "Rasta Imposter"
- "This Means Money"
- "Winner" (2008)
- "Realest Song" (2010)
- "No retreat"(2010)
- "Gal Dem A Talk" (2010)
- "Realest Medz" (2010)
- "Weak" (reggae) (2010)
- "Represent" (2011)
- "Forward" (2011)
- "Buss A Blank" (2011)
- "Touch Back Again" (2011)
- "Bounce Like A Ball" (2011)
- "Jamaican Dance" (2011)
- "Bad Gyal" (2011)
- "Gal A Bubble" (2012)
- "Do Sum'n" (2012)
- "Shat A Fyah" (2012)
- "Stop Sign" (2012)
- "Touch Regular" (2012)
- "Gyal Sidung" (2012)
- "So Mi Tan" (2012)
- "On Your Face" (2012)
- "Mad Mi" (2012)
- "I'm Coming" (2012)
- "Jiggle" (2013)
- "Couple Up" (2013)
- "U Better Miss Me" (2013)
- "Walk And Wine" (2013)
- "Give Praise" (2013)
- "Depend on You" (2013)
- "Tan Up An Wuk" (2013)
- "Weak" (2013)
- "Show Yourself" (2013)
- "Pull Up To Mi Bumper" (& J Capri) (2013)
- "We A Hustle" (2013)
- "Sekkle Dung" (featuring Raine Seville) (2013)
- "Turbo Wine" (featuring Rickman) (2013)
- "We No Worry Bout Them" (featuring Romain Virgo) (2013)
- "To Her with Love" (2013)
- "Weed on Me" (2014)
- "Forever Young" (2014)
- "Independent Girl" (2014)
- "Money" (featuring Masicka) (2014)
- "Come Get This" (2014)
- "Touch You" (2014)
- "Duppy Dem" (2014)
- "Don Daddy" (2014)
- "Bruk Off Yuh Back" (2016) BPI: Silver
- "Turn Me On" (2017)

==== Charted singles ====
List of charted singles, showing year released, chart positions and album name
Title	Year	Peak chart position	Album
Title	Year	JAM Air.	Album
"Original Daddy"	2015	1	Advice Riddim

=== As featured artist ===
- "Feel So Right" (Imposs featuring Konshens)
- "Good Girl Gone Bad" (Tarrus Riley featuring Konshens)
- "Feels Right" (Pleasure P featuring Konshens) (2014)
- "Want Dem All" (Sean Paul featuring Konshens) (2014)
- "Policeman" (Eva Simons featuring Konshens) (2015)
- "No Friend Zone" (Mink Jo featuring Konshens) (2016)
- "Can't Wait" (Kreesha Turner featuring Konshens) (2016)
- "Don't Let Me Down" (The Chainsmokers featuring Daya and Konshens) (Dom Da Bomb & Electric Bodega Remix) (2016)
- "Tropical Limelight" (Tha Hot$hot and Stekaly featuring Konshens) (2014)
- "Back It Up" (Cardi B featuring Konshens and Hoodcelebrityy) (2017)
- "Si Tu Lo Dejas" (Rvssian featuring Nicky Jam, Farruko, Arcangel, and Konshens) RIAA: 6× Platinum
- "Oh God" (Era Istrefi featuring Konshens) (2018)
- "I Don't Dance (Without You)" (Matoma with Enrique Iglesias featuring Konshens) (2018)
- "Wine Pon You" (Doja Cat featuring Konshens) (2018)
- "Reload" (Eve featuring Konshens) (2019)
- "Make A Move" (DJ Katch feat. Konshens & BAMMBI) (2019)
- "Voodoo" (Mr. Mauricio feat. Pitbull, Jencarlos & Konshens) (2020)
