= Sex on the Beach (song) =

1997 single by T-Spoon

- Dutch maxi-CD artwork

Single by T-Spoon

from the album The Hit Collection
- Released: 4 July 1997
- Length: 3:55
- Label: Alabianca
- Songwriters: Serge Ramaekers; Dominic Sas; Remy De Groot; Humphrey Mijland; Shalamon "Shamrock" Baskin
- Producers: Serge Ramaekers; Dominic Sas

T-Spoon singles chronology
"Fly Away" (1997)	"Sex on the Beach" (1997)	"Message of Love" (1997)

"Sex on the Beach" is a song by Dutch Eurodance group T-Spoon. It was released as a single in July 1997 and found chart success in several countries, peaking at number one in Japan, number two in the United Kingdom and number three in the Netherlands. In some countries, the song's title had to be changed to "Fun on the Beach", because of censorship. In 2004, the song was released in a new version as "Sex on the Beach 2004". This version reached number 70 in the Netherlands.

== Critical reception ==
Scottish newspaper Daily Record commented, "Is this a song about hypothermia or are we simply a nostalgic nation harking back to the nonexistent summer of sunshine?" They also compared it to Aqua's "Barbie Girl".

== Chart performance ==
"Sex on the Beach" was successful on the charts in Europe, Japan and New Zealand, and remains the group's biggest hit to date. It reached number one in Japan and made it to the top 10 in Belgium, Ireland, the Netherlands, and the United Kingdom. In the latter nation, the single debuted at number two during its first week on the UK Singles Chart, on September 13, 1998. On the UK Indie Chart, it peaked at number one, and on the Eurochart Hot 100, it rose to number 16. Outside Europe, "Sex on the Beach" charted in both New Zealand and Australia, peaking at numbers six and 64, respectively. It earned a gold record in both New Zealand and the UK.

== Music video ==
A music video was made for "Sex on the Beach", directed by Kenny Wisdom. It features the group partying with people on a beach.

== Track listings ==
- CD single (Netherlands, 1997)
1. "Sex on the Beach" (Ibiza radio mix) – 3:42
2. "Sex on the Beach" (original mix) – 3:52
- CD maxi (Netherlands, 1997)
1. "Sex on the Beach" (Ibiza radio mix) – 3:42
2. "Sex on the Beach" (original mix) – 3:52
3. "Sex on the Beach" (Summer mix) – 4:11
4. "Sex on the Beach" (extended original edit) – 5:47
- 12-inch single (Germany, 1997)
1. "Sex on the Beach" (Miami mix) – 4:11
2. "Sex on the Beach" (Ibiza radio mix) – 3:42
3. "Sex on the Beach" (original mix) – 3:52
4. "Sex on the Beach" (extended original edit) – 5:47
- 7-inch single (US, 1999)
1. "Sex on the Beach" (radio edit) – 3:42
2. "Sex on the Beach" (Lectroluv radio mix) – 4:03

== Charts ==
=== Weekly charts ===
Chart (1997–1998)	Peak position
Australia (ARIA)	64
Belgium (Ultratop 50 Flanders)	4
Europe (Eurochart Hot 100)	16
Ireland (IRMA)	3
Japan (Japanese Singles Chart)	1
Netherlands (Dutch Top 40)	3
Netherlands (Single Top 100)	5
New Zealand (Recorded Music NZ)	6
Scotland Singles (OCC)	3
UK Singles (OCC)	2
UK Indie (OCC)	1

Chart (2004)	Peak position
Netherlands (Single Top 100)	70

=== Year-end charts ===
Chart (1997)	Position
Belgium (Ultratop 50 Flanders)	39
Netherlands (Dutch Top 40)	14
Netherlands (Single Top 100)	23
Romania (Romanian Top 100)	86

Chart (1998)	Position
UK Singles (OCC)	38

== Certifications ==
Region	Certification	Certified units/sales
New Zealand (RMNZ)	Gold	5,000^{*}
United Kingdom (BPI)	Gold	400,000^{‡}
^{*} Sales figures based on certification alone.^{‡} Sales+streaming figures based on certification alone.

== Release history ==
Region	Date	Format(s)	Label(s)	Ref.
Benelux	4 July 1997	CD	Alabianca	
United Kingdom	1 September 1997	12-inch vinyl; CD	Control	
United Kingdom (re-release)	1998	CD	Control	
Japan	8 May 1999	CD	Polydor; BAM	
United States	29 June 1999	Rhythmic contemporary; contemporary hit radio	550 Music; Epic; Daylight	
