= I Don't Like You =

Single by Eva Simons
- Released: 26 March 2012
- Recorded: 2011
- Length: 4:13
- Label: Interscope
- Songwriters: Eva Simons; Mike Hamilton; Benny Benassi; Alessandro Benassi; Anton Zaslavski
- Producer: Zedd

Eva Simons singles chronology
"Take Over Control" (2010)	"I Don't Like You" (2012)	"This Is Love" (2012)

Music video
- "I Don't Like You" on YouTube

"I Don't Like You" is a song by Dutch singer Eva Simons. It was released on 26 March 2012. It topped the US Hot Dance Club Songs.

== Background ==
"I Don't Like You" is Simons' debut on the label Interscope Records and it was produced by Russian-German producer Zedd. The song was included on Now That's What I Call Music! 43, with the collection debuting at number one on the US Billboard 200.

== Remixes ==
Nicholas Philippou from MTV reported that Dutch producer R3hab had remixed the single. It was included on a digital remix EP, released to promote the single on 22 May 2012.

== Critical reception ==
Kristin Houser from LA Music branded the song as a "straightforward single", which has Simons "poised to be the next breakthrough artist in the dance music scene." Lansky opined that the song is a "brilliant pastiche" of many different dance-pop genres, being a mixture of "frosty house, buzzing chopped 'n' screwed electro, grimy dubstep, and glitchy progressive house" mixed in with Simons' "husky vocals". He added that she serves up a "chilling falsetto" during the chorus. The writer concluded that overall the song feels as though the listener is in "five different nightclubs at once" with all the elements to secure a "big dance hit".

== Music video ==
The accompanying music video was released via Vevo on 27 April 2012. In the video, Simons and two other females are depicted entering her unfaithful partner's apartment to vandalise his property in an act of revenge. She disposes of his alcohol beverages, smashes items and throws flowers down a fire escape. In one scene she gives his dog a haircut.

MTV's Sam Lansky noted that the video helped to "remind us not to get on Eva Simons' bad side" because the video is "all about revenge". They praised Simons' trademark hairstyle which was "put front and center"; adding that she was "killing it" with some "The Girl with the Dragon Tattoo" warrior princess realness". Lansky opined that Simons and her backing females' attire consisted of "glamorous kicking-ass-or-maybe-going-to-the-club outfits and heels". However, he named cutting the dog's hair off a "cold" act.

== Track listing and formats ==
- Digital download
1. "I Don't Like You" – 4:13
- Digital download (Remixes EP)
1. "I Don't Like You" (Nicky Romero Remix) – 5:39
2. "I Don't Like You" (Fred Falke Remix) – 7:09
3. "I Don't Like You" (R3hab Remix) – 5:23
4. "I Don't Like You" (Nick Thayer Remix) – 4:25

== Charts ==
=== Weekly charts ===
Chart (2012)	Peak position
US Hot Dance Club Songs (Billboard)	1

=== Year-end charts ===
Chart (2012)	Position
US Billboard Hot Dance Club Songs	29

== Release history ==
Country	Release date	Format
United States	26 March 2012	Digital download
United States	22 May 2012	Digital download – Remixes
United States	26 June 2012	Rhythmic radio

== See also ==
- List of number-one dance singles of 2012 (U.S.)
