= Trady =

Chinese singer (born 1982)

- 崔迪
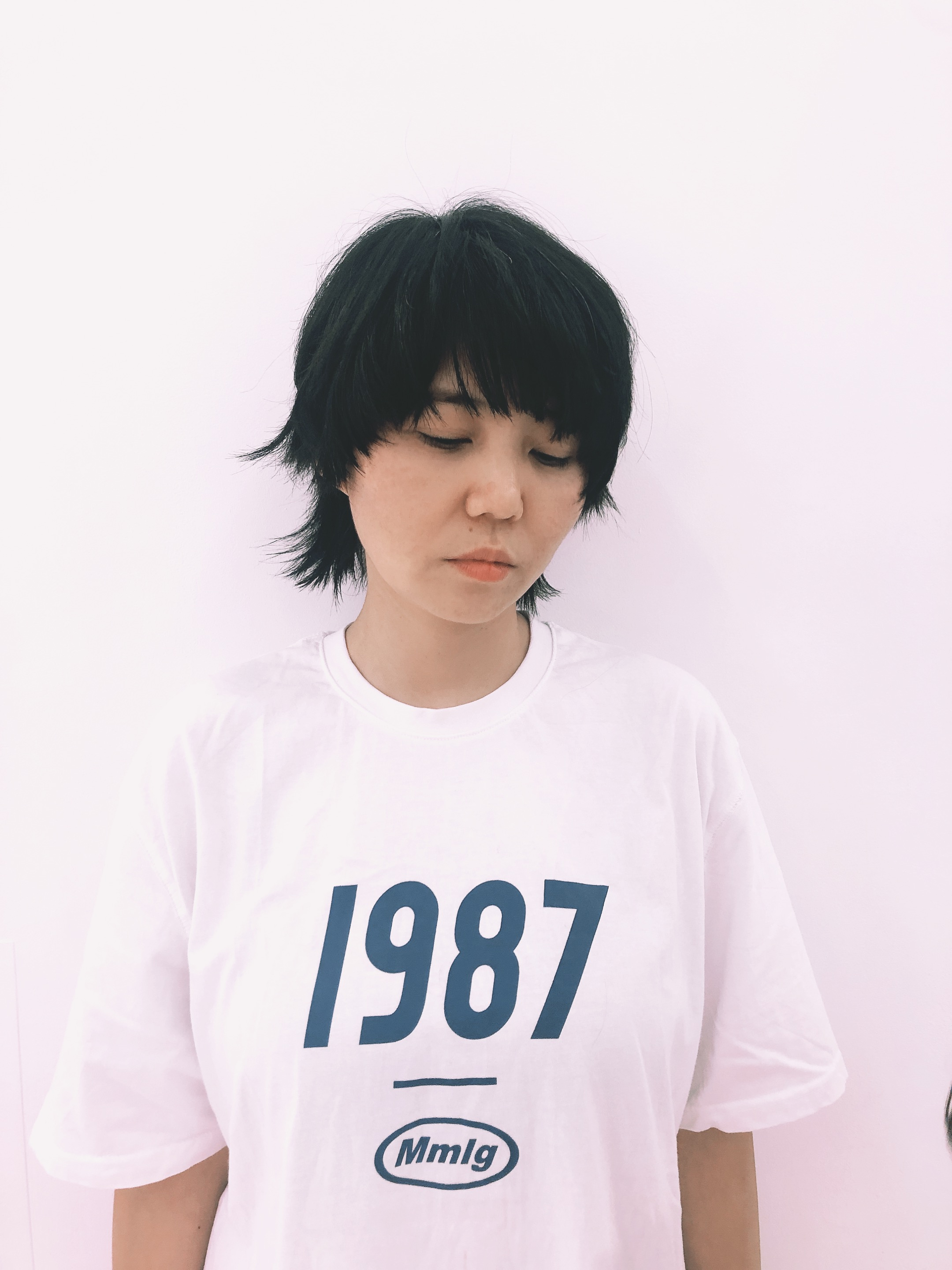
- Trady
- Born: Cui Di（崔迪） January 10, 1982 (age 44); Shuangliao, Jilin, China
- Education: Jilin University of Arts
- Occupations: Singer, songwriter
- Years active: 2020–present
- Agent(s): Bel Rumore, Trady Studio

Trady (Chinese: 崔迪; pinyin: Cuī Dí; born January 10, 1982) is a Chinese singer-songwriter and music producer. She released her debut album Trady 1.0 in 2020. The album received a nomination for "Best Electronic Music Album" at the CMIC Music Awards. Its first song, "Break to Live", "incorporates a large number of modern retro synth sounds, and the Synthwave synth wave is strong and impactful, giving people a sense of power from the inside out". During the 13th Chinese Music Awards, she received a nomination for "Best Mandarin Female Newcomer Award". In October 2021, She released her single titled "Dare to Live" as the promotional song for 2021 Summer World University Games.

According to Toutiao, before she began her career as a singer, she was known as a "gold medal female producer" for making numerous well-known songs for singers including Jane Zhang, Han Geng, Yao Beina, and Yisa Yu.

Her husband is the musician Wan Jiaming (Chinese: 万家铭).

== Studio albums ==
- Trady 1.0 (2020)

== Awards ==
Year	Awards	Category	Nominee/work	Result	Ref.
2006	Music Pioneer Awards	Top 10 Pioneer Songs of the Year	Light	Won	
2022	CMIC Music Awards	Best Electronic Music Album	Trady 1.0	Nominated	
