= Celebrate the Rain =

Single by Sidney Samson and Eva Simons
- Released: 2 May 2014
- Genre: Progressive house
- Length: 3:41
- Label: Spinnin'
- Songwriters: Mijke Breepoel; Sidney Samson; Evangaline Simons
- Producer: Sidney Samson

Sidney Samson singles chronology
"Bubbels" (2013)	"Celebrate the Rain" (2014)	"Bludfire" (2015)

Eva Simons singles chronology
"Chemistry" (2013)	"Celebrate the Rain" (2014)	"This Girl" (2014)

"Celebrate the Rain" is a song recorded by Dutch house producer Sidney Samson featuring vocals from Dutch singer Eva Simons. It marks as Sidney and Eva's first collaboration. An official music video was released which features Eva and Sidney standing in a desert with pyramid shapes in the background. It was filmed in black and white.

On 15 May 2014 a bootleg was released by electro and progressive house DJ Schooki. The bootleg was supported by Spinnin' Records.

== Composition ==
Dancerebels.com described the track as a progressive house song and a departure from Sidney's "big electro" tracks that featured "grimy Dutch house sounds".

== Track listing and format ==
Digital download
No.	Title	Length
1.	"Celebrate the Rain" (Radio Edit)	3:41
2.	"Celebrate the Rain" (Original Mix)	5:54

== Weekly charts ==
Chart (2014)	Peak position
Netherlands (Single Top 100)	23
