= This Girl (Stafford Brothers and Eva Simons song) =

Single by Stafford Brothers and Eva Simons featuring T.I.

from the album This Girl EP
- Released: 27 June 2014
- Recorded: 2014
- Genre: Dance; pop
- Length: 3:35
- Label: Cash Money Records; CHM Records; Universal Republic Records
- Songwriters: T.I.; Alex James; Onefeme Ogbene; Whitney Phillips; Eva Simons; Harry Sommerdahl; Chris Stafford; Matthew Stafford
- Producers: Stafford Brothers; Alex James; Harry Sommerdahl

Stafford Brothers singles chronology
| "Wicked Child" (2013) | "This Girl" (2014) | "When You Feel This" (2015) |

Eva Simons singles chronology
| "Celebrate the Rain" (2014) | "This Girl" (2014) | "Policeman" (2015) |

T.I. singles chronology
| "No Mediocre" (2014) | "This Girl" (2014) | "Ejeajo" (2014) |

Music video
- "This Girl" on YouTube

"This Girl" is a song by Australian DJs and producers Stafford Brothers and Eva Simons featuring T.I. It was released as a single in Australia on 27 June 2014 and globally on 12 August 2014.

The Stafford Brothers first leaked the collaboration via an exclusive private performance alongside Eva Simons in a Sydney warehouse in January 2014. Chris Stafford says "We knew it was shaping up to be a great track when we first heard Eva's vocals, we were thrilled when we heard from management that T.I. was into it and wanted to do a feature. Having such a huge superstar be a part of this is truly amazing and a huge honour."

The song peaked at number 9 on the Australian Dance Chart and number 58 on the overall Australian Singles Chart, and number 7 in Belgium dance bubbling under chart.

== Critical reception ==
Mike Wass of Idolator reviewed the song, saying; "“Give me wings, make me fly,” sings the Dutch dance queen over fluttery synths before arriving at the fast and furious chorus, which basically consists of her repeating: “do it one more time for this girl!” T.I shows up towards the end to rap about “making love in the Benz” but the real star is the manic production. After a seemingly endless string of folk-tinged EDM anthems, it's a relief to hear a balls-to-the-wall club banger."

== Music video ==
The video was filmed in Atlanta, In describing the video, Chris Stafford said, "The first night of filming was like a party because it was in a club and everyone was drinking. The second day was much more serious, but it was in a strip club."

The video for "This Girl" was released on the Stafford Brothers' VEVO account on 3 September 2014.

== Track listing ==
Maxi Single

1. This Girl (Radio Edit) 3:35
2. This Girl (Explicit) 3:36
3. This Girl (Parker Ighile House Of Hausa Mix) 3:45
4. This Girl (Tom Swoon Remix) 6:03
5. This Girl (Scndl Remix) 4:21
6. This Girl (Togglehead Remix) 5:03

== Weekly charts ==
| Chart (2014) | Peak position |
|---|---|
| Australia (ARIA) | 58 |
