= Real Talk (Konshens album) =

Studio album by Konshens
- Released: December 22, 2010
- Genre: Reggae; dancehall
- Length: 65:42
- Label: Subkonshus Music

Konshens chronology
Real Talk (2010)	Mental Maintenance (2010)

Real Talk is the debut studio album by Jamaican reggae singer, Konshens. It was released on December 22, 2010.

This album was mainly released in Japan only because of the recording label he was signed to at that time.

== Track listing ==
No.	Title	Length
1.	"All About the Paper"	3:38
2.	"This Means Money"	3:12
3.	"Pretty Devil"	3:18
4.	"Out The Ghetto"	5:06
5.	"Good Girl Gone Bad [feat, Tarrus Riley]"	3:37
6.	"Hooked On You Feat Darrio"	3:31
7.	"Rasta Imposter ‐ Real Rasta"	4:54
8.	"Back A Yawd ‐ Original Yard"	3:13
9.	"We Belong Together Feat Delus"	2:28
10.	"Realest Remix [feat, Bounty Killer]"	4:25
11.	"Survivor"	4:45
12.	"Mama Proud"	4:37
13.	"She7s Happy Feat Delus"	4:06
14.	"Winner Remix [feat, Usain Bolt]"	3:22
15.	"Music"
Total length:		65:42
