= Raine Seville =

- Also known as: Raine Seville
- Born: Loraine Seville; 25 July 1986 (age 39); Kingston, Jamaica
- Genres: Dancehall; Reggae
- Occupation: Singer
- Years active: 2009–present
- Labels: The Island Def Jam Music Group

Loraine Seville (born 25 July 1986), better known by her stage names Raine Seville, is a Jamaican dancehall and reggae artist.

She was born and raised in Kingston, Jamaica.

She started singing while she was still young and in 2004 she joined the first Digicel Rising Stars in Mandeville to pursue music and she only made it to the top 100, at the same time she was a part-time student at the Edna Manley College of the Visual and Performing Arts until the year 2006.

From 2006 to 2007, she continued voice classes with the voice trainer Georgia Schlifer.
