= T-Spoon =

Dutch Eurodance project

- Origin: Amsterdam, Netherlands
- Genres: Eurodance
- Years active: 1991–present
- Members: Dominic Sas (co-producer); Serge Ramaekers (co-producer); Shalamon Baskin (aka Shamrock); Linda Estelle; Remy de Groot
- Past members: Greg Dillard; Ingrid Simons; King Lover (Humprey Mijland)

T-Spoon is a Dutch Eurodance project founded in 1991 by rapper Shalamon Baskin (aka Shamrock) and co-founder Remy de Groot (aka Prince Peration). The project was offered a recording contract by No More Music.

== Musical career ==
The debut T-Spoon single "No Time 2 Waste" was released in 1993, which reached the top 10 in Europe (the single "Spank", released in 1991 under the same project name, is probably from a different project).

During the following years, T-Spoon scored a string of hits, which brought them success in countries like the UK, Australia, Canada, Israel, Ireland, Scandinavia, South America and their home country, the Netherlands with songs like "A Part of My Life", "Where R U Now", "Take Me 2 the Limit" and "Sex on the Beach". They released four full album CDs, including a remix CD and a hit single collection. Their music is mainly Eurodance, including tracks of the R&B, happy hardcore and Euro reggae genres.

Behind T-Spoon stands Prince Peration (Dutch Remy de Groot), the group's founder and one of its driving forces. The co-producers were Dominic Sas and Serge Ramaekers (known for their projects Confetti's and Cartouche). On stage, T-Spoon consisted of four members: a female vocalist (Ingrid Simons, Jean Shy, Blonde, then Linda Estelle) and a male rapper (Shamrock, replaced in 1998 by Greg Dillard, then in 2001 by King Lover), and the two dancers, Regilio and Anatevka Bos.

In 1994, American jazz/blues vocalist Jean Shy was the featured singer for the Dutch formation.

In 1996, singer Linda Estelle joined the group, which changed the band's direction into the then-popular happy hardcore genre. In 1997, they became known for the summer hit "Sex on the Beach" which made the charts in the Netherlands as well as Belgium, Germany, Ireland, Scandinavia and the United Kingdom. The song was first released in Ireland following its success in Europe. There it became one of the biggest hits of the year, peaking at number 3 in the Irish charts. Such was the success in Ireland that the song was released in the United Kingdom at the end of the summer and reached number 2 in the UK charts.

In 1998, Shamrock left the group and was replaced by Greg Dillard. With Dillard as the band's new rapper, the group had a 1999 hit with "Summerlove". In 2000, Dillard left, and Estelle became the new face of the group. In 2002, Shamrock rejoined T-Spoon, and the group subsequently released a number of remixes that were not very successful.

In 2008, Shamrock and Linda Estelle toured with their 'T-Spoon Reloaded Show'. In March, they performed at Ekonomika Rewind Leuven (Belgium). In December, it was announced that Linda Estelle and Shamrock were back in the studio, and that they would record some new songs together to be released the following year.

In February 2009, they announced that they were busy recording and remixing some of their old hits, and that they had started writing new songs and were looking for collaborations throughout the world. In June, they appeared at Q Music's Foute Party in Den Bosch. Then they took part in a commercial for Johma salads' 40th anniversary, with Shamrock doing a sing/rap style in Dutch.

In 2010, there were 3 different T-Spoon formations for all tours, all of them official: Blondi & Raw Jawz, Linda & Shamrock and T Spoon DJ Squad. Remy de Groot explained that "We have the past, present & future, the past is T-spoon Reloaded with Shamrock & Linda, the present is the fresh young T-Spoon with Raw Jawz & Blondi, and the future is T-Spoon DJ Squad, for every generation there is something to enjoy about T-Spoon".

In 2012, T-Spoon released a collaboration with Dirty House Bastards featuring Akon titled "Dubhop Shawty".

In 2013, T-Spoon released a new single titled "Ticket to the Tropics". It is a cover of a song released in 1985 by Dutch artist Gerard Joling.

=== Origin of the name ===
Legend says that Shamrock said while stirring a cup of tea "I'd rather have a gold record than a gold tea spoon any day". "That's it," exclaimed Prince Peration, "That's the name", and so the name T-Spoon was born. More recently, Remy de Groot explained that the name actually came from a western TV show in which the sheriff was called Teaspoon.

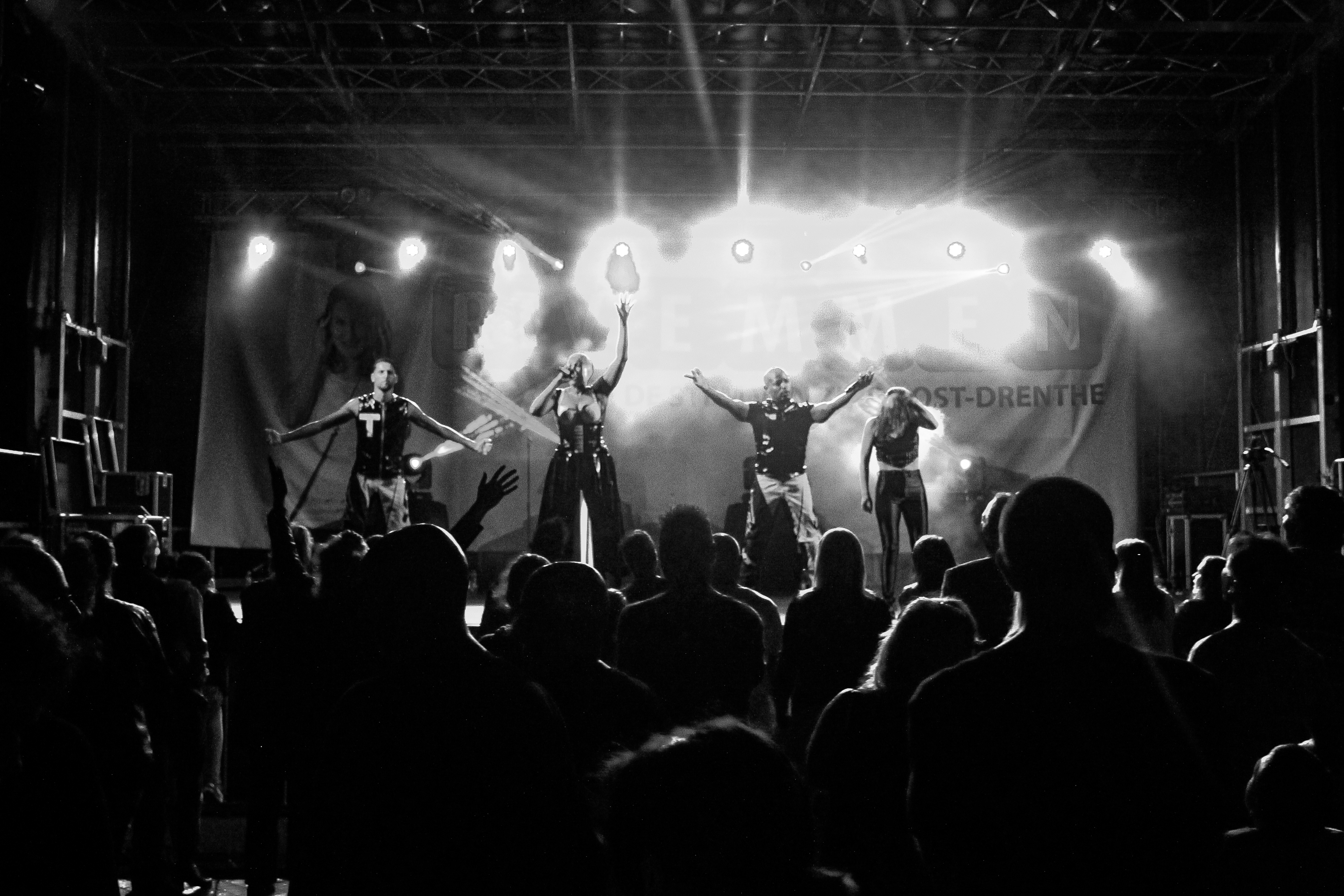
T-Spoon

== Discography ==
=== Studio albums ===
Title	Details	Peak chart positions
Title	Details	NLD
Joy, Life & Pain	Release date: October 1994; Label: Alabianca Records; Formats: CD	71
Lexicon of Melody	Release date: September 1996; Label: Alabianca Records; Formats: CD	76
The Hit Collection	Release date: September 1997; Label: Alabianca Records; Formats: CD	15
T-Spoon	Release date: April 1999; Label: Alabianca Records; Formats: CD	—
"—" denotes releases that did not chart

=== Singles ===
Year	Single	Peak chart positions						Certifications (sales thresholds)	Album
Year	Single	NLD	AUS	BEL (Fl)	IRE	NZ	UK	Certifications (sales thresholds)	Album
1993	"No Time 2 Waste"	10	—	31	—	—	—		Joy, Life & Pain
1994	"Take Me 2 the Limit"	9	—	43	—	—	—		Joy, Life & Pain
1994	"Where R U Now" (featuring Jean Shy)	10	—	39	—	—	—		Joy, Life & Pain
1995	"Mercedes Benz" (featuring Jean Shy)	7	—	40	—	—	—		Joy, Life & Pain
1995	"See the Light"	19	—	—	—	—	—		Joy, Life & Pain
1995	"A Part of My Life"	17	—	—	—	—	—		Lexicon of Melody
1996	"Rockstar"	23	—	—	—	—	—		Lexicon of Melody
1996	"Someone Loves You Honey"	27	—	—	—	—	—		Lexicon of Melody
1996	"Smiling"	18	—	—	—	—	—		Lexicon of Melody
1997	"Fly Away"	90	—	—	—	—	—		Lexicon of Melody
1997	"Sex on the Beach"	5	64	4	3	6	2	BPI: Silver	The Hit Collection
1997	"Message of Love"	76	—	53	—	—	—		The Hit Collection
1998	"Tom's Party"	57	—	28	23	13	27		Single only
1999	"Got 2 Get U Back"	54	—	—	—	—	—		T-Spoon
1999	"Summerlove"	14	—	61	—	—	—		T-Spoon
1999	"I Want to Be Your Man"	93	—	—	—	—	—		T-Spoon
2000	"F.O.O.T.B.A.L.L. / Delicious"	58	—	—	—	—	—		T-Spoon
2004	"Sex on the Beach 2004"	70	—	—	—	—	—		Singles only
2009	"No Time 2 Waste 2009"	94	—	—	—	—	—		Singles only
"—" denotes releases that did not chart
