= Richard Orlinski =

French artist

- Born: January 6, 1966 (age 60); Paris, France
- Education: Bachelor in Economics, University of Paris – Sorbonne (1990)
- Known for: Sculptor, neo-pop artist
- Notable work: “Born Wild” series
- Website: richardorlinski.fr

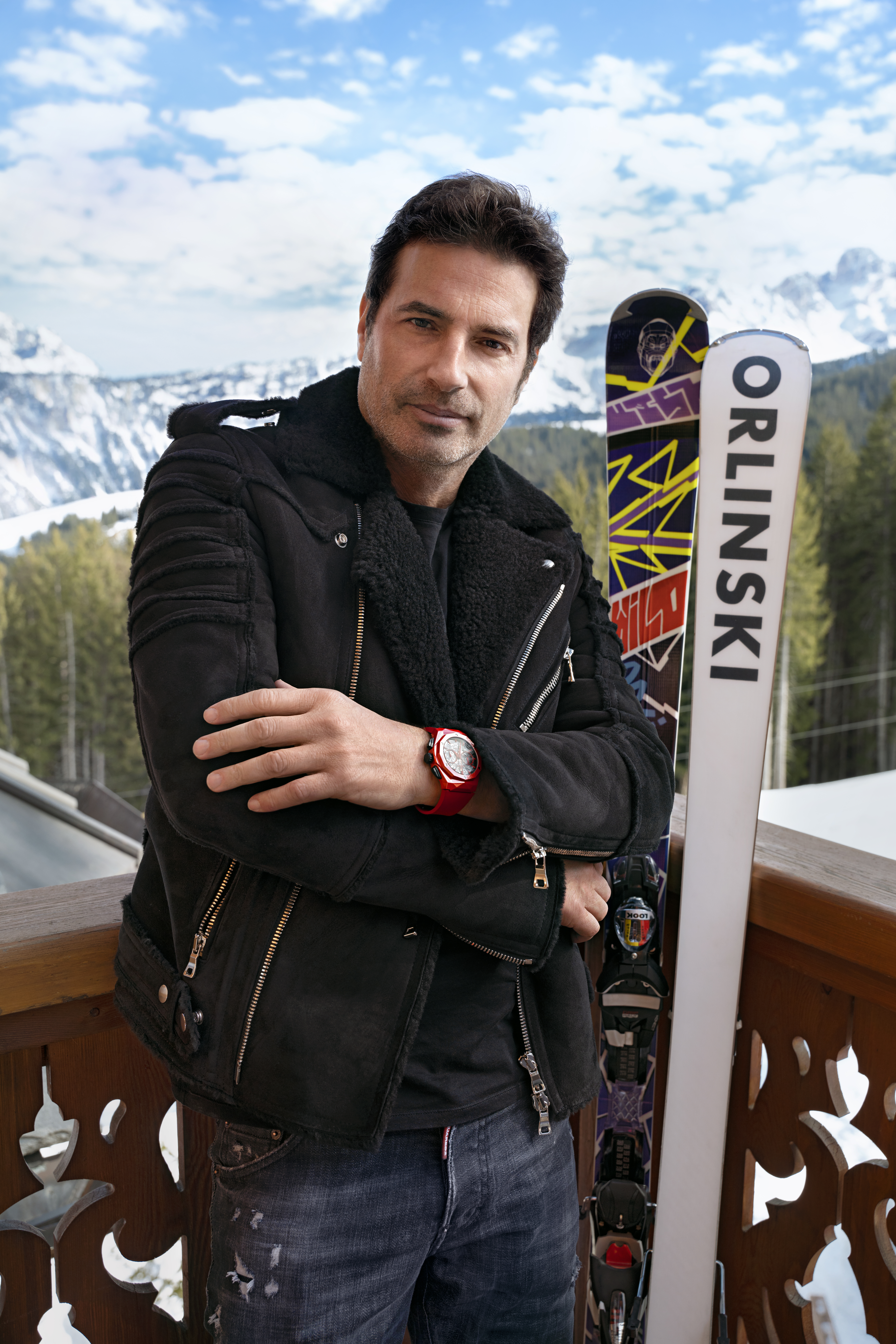
Image of Richard Orlinski

Richard Orlinski (born 1966 in Paris) is a French sculptor and visual neo-pop artist.

== Early life and education ==
Richard Orlinski was born on January 6, 1966, in Paris, France. After earning a bachelor’s degree in economics from the University of Paris – Sorbonne in 1990, he pursued a traditional career in real estate until a personal burnout in 2004 prompted him to devote himself full-time to art.

== Artistic career ==
Orlinski’s first public sculpture was unveiled in 2004: a red resin crocodile that prefigured his signature “Born Wild” series of faceted animal forms. “Born Wild” sculptures — animals such as lions and gorillas — combine pop-art sensibility with cubist geometry and have appeared in over 200 galleries and public installations worldwide.

== TV and Film ==
In 2021 Orlinski started hosting TV5Monde’s street-art documentary series Sur Les Murs, meeting French-speaking street artists around the world.

In 2024, David Serero directs and produces the film "Richard Orlinski, The Art Documentary" about Orlinski's career through various interviews with the artist, also starring Eva Longoria, Bernard Montiel, Laurent Baffie, Romain Grosjean, John Mamann, Tayc, Marlene Schiappa as well as his artistic collaborations with brands such as Hublot, The Kooples, Lancome.

== Music ==
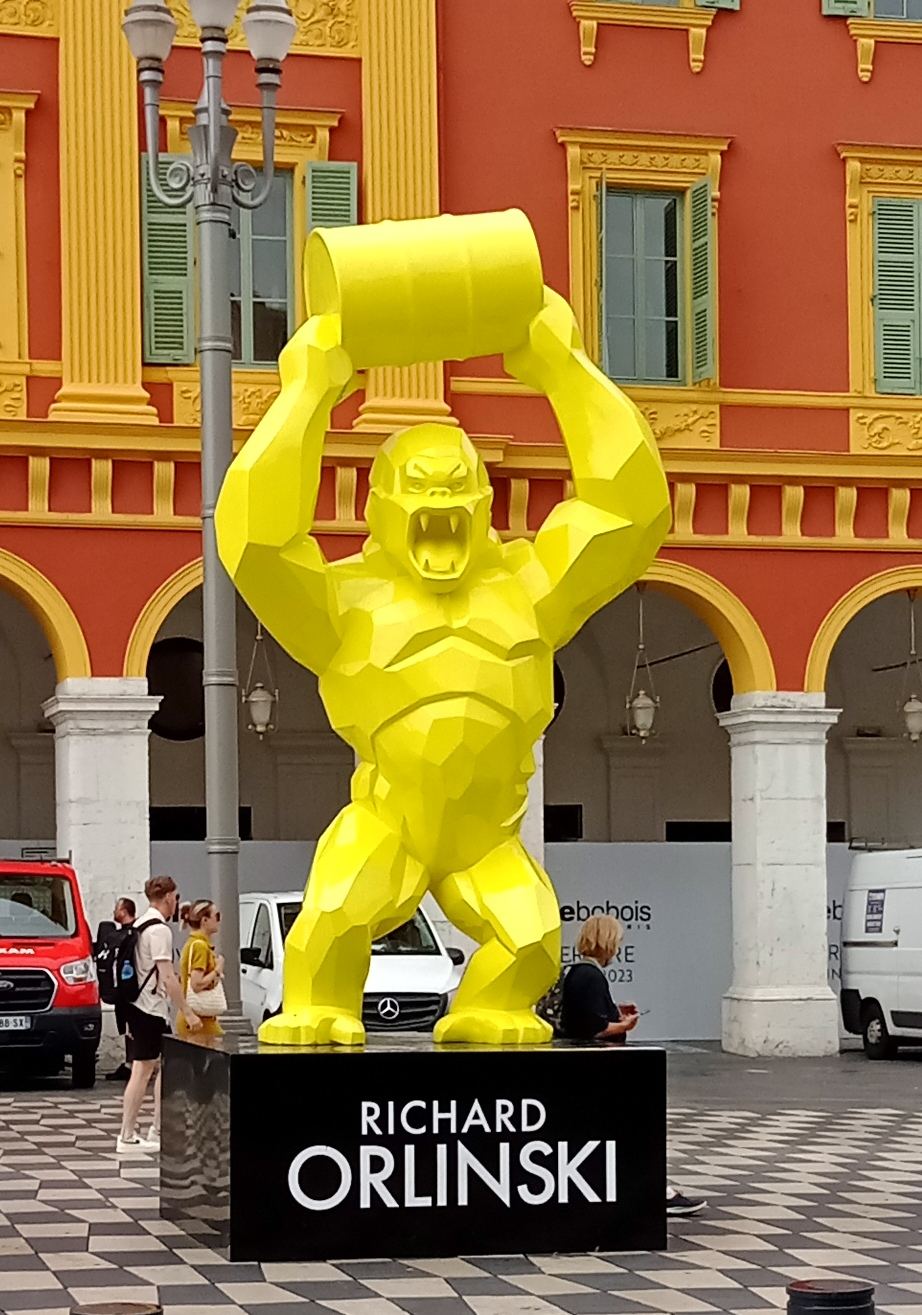
Gorilla Sculpture

Orlinski also produces music, premiering Heartbeat featuring Dutch pop singer Eva Simons in 2016 in Cannes.

== Exhibitions ==
- 2006 – FIAC, Grand Palais, Paris
- 2014 – Galeries Orlinski (flagship galleries) opened in Miami and Gstaad
- 2019 – In December 2019, he exhibited sculptures from his "Born Wild" collection at the Markowicz Fine Art, an American contemporary art gallery.
