= Wicked Child =

Single by Jason Herd and Stafford Brothers featuring Sherry St.Germain
- Released: 15 November 2013
- Recorded: 2013
- Genre: Dance, Electronic
- Length: 3:37
- Label: oneLove
- Songwriter(s): Jason Herd, Sherry St.Germain, Chris Stafford, Matthew Stafford
- Producer(s): Jason Herd, Stafford Brothers

Stafford Brothers singles chronology
| "Hello" (2012) | "Wicked Child" (2013) | "This Girl" (2014) |

Music video
- "Wicked Child" on YouTube

"Wicked Child" is a song by British house artist Jason Herd, Australian DJs and producers Stafford Brothers featuring US singer/songwriter, Sherry St.Germain on vocals. It was released as a single in Australia on 15 November 2013.

In January 2014, the song peaked at number 61 on the Australian Singles Chart, becoming the group's third top 100 single, following "More Than a Feeling" (no.90 in April 2006) and "Hello" (no.4 in April 2013) The song peaked at number 12 on the Australian Dance Chart, number 11 on the Australian Artists chart.

== Music video ==
A music video was directed by Joe Nappa. It was released on oneLove's YouTube channel in January 2014.

== Track listing ==
1-track single

1. "Wicked Child" (radio edit) - 3:37

Digital Remixes

1. "Wicked Child" (Original Extended) - 6:03
2. "Wicked Child" (Paris & Simo Remix) - 4:33
3. "Wicked Child" (Stevie Mink Remix) - 5:48
4. "Wicked Child" (Slice N Dice Remix) - 5:52

== Weekly charts ==
| Chart (2014) | Peak position |
|---|---|
| Australia (ARIA) | 61 |
