= Real Talk (R. Kelly song) =

Song by R. Kelly

from the album Double Up
- Released: September 28, 2007
- Recorded: 2006
- Genre: R&B, hip hop
- Length: 3:00
- Label: Jive
- Songwriter(s): R. Kelly
- Producer(s): R. Kelly

"Real Talk" is a song by American R&B singer R. Kelly. It was produced by R. Kelly and is from his eighth studio album Double Up.

== Music video ==
Although it was not released as an official single, an uncensored video was made by R. Kelly directly on YouTube with the same use of vulgar profanity as heard on the album. The setting of the entire video was in a recording studio. The video begins with R. Kelly explaining the reason he shot the video for YouTube. Then he is shown on the phone talking to who potentially is his ex-girlfriend. Then at the conclusion of the video, a fight ensues among his friends with R. Kelly demanding the cameraman to turn off the camera.
