= Mental Maintenance =

Studio album by Konshens
- Released: February 28, 2012
- Genre: Reggae; dancehall
- Length: 1:05:42
- Label: Subkonshus Music/VPAL

Konshens chronology
Real Talk (2010)	Mental Maintenance (2012)	Road Album (2014)

Mental Maintenance is the second studio album by Jamaican reggae singer, Konshens. It was released on March 6, 2012, under Subkonshus Music/VPAL in the U.S. The album was first released on February 28 in Jamaica.

This album is his first worldwide album as a solo singer although his Japan only album, Real Talk, was released in 2010.

According to Konshens, this album is about mood swings. In an interview for oonuyard.com, he says “The feel of the album is just as the name states. It is like experiencing the mood swings required to maintain, ease, settle and redirect one's mind. There is a song on the album for every situation”.

This album became No.1 of the Japan and the Germany iTunes reggae album charts. It also ranked inside the top ten of the iTunes charts in Switzerland, the Netherlands and New Zealand.

== Track listing ==
No.	Title	Length
1.	"World Citizen"	3:38
2.	"Represent"	3:12
3.	"Simple Song"	3:18
4.	"Rasta Imposter Remix (featuring Tarrus Riley, Sizzla, Darrio & Wrath Riley)"	5:06
5.	"Do Sumn"	3:37
6.	"Bounce"	3:31
7.	"Pop In My Headphones (Spliff Medz Interlude)"	4:54
8.	"Last Drink"	3:13
9.	"Homewrecker"	2:28
10.	"Leave Your Side"	4:25
11.	"Gal Dem A Talk (Voice Notes Interlude)"	4:45
12.	"Only Jah"	4:37
13.	"Wanna Be Done (Mi Luv Har Interlude)"	4:06
14.	"No More Tears"	3:22
15.	"Love This Life"	3:39
16.	"The Realest Remix (featuring Bounty Killer)"	3:57
17.	"She’s Happy"	3:54
Total length:		1:05:42
