= When You Feel This =

Single by Stafford Brothers featuring Rick Ross and Jay Sean
- Released: 10 July 2015
- Recorded: 2015
- Genre: Dance, pop
- Length: 3:24
- Label: Cash Money, Sony Music Australia
- Songwriters: Kyle Abrahams; Peter Ighile; Nima Nasseri; Onefeme Ogbeni; James Reeves; Jay Sean; Chris Keith Stafford; Matthew Robert Stafford

Stafford Brothers singles chronology
"This Girl" (2014)	"When You Feel This" (2015)	"Love Cliche" (2017)

Rick Ross singles chronology
"Peace Sign" (2015)	"When You Feel This" (2015)	"Sorry" (2015)

Jay Sean singles chronology
"Wild Horses" (2014)	"When You Feel This" (2015)	"Freak" (2015)

Music video
- "When You Feel Thisl" on YouTube

"When You Feel This" is a song by Australian DJs and producers Stafford Brothers features rapper Rick Ross and British singer Jay Sean. It was released as a single in Australia on 10 July 2015.

The song peaked at number 12 on the Australian Dance Chart, number 9 on the Australian Artists chart and number 70 on the overall Australian Singles Chart,

A remix EP was released on 28 September 2015.

== Reviews ==
Petey Mac of Your EDM said the song was "a gem", saying "[Stafford Brothers] incorporate a bit of drum 'n' bass into the mix as Jay Sean’s iconic voice hooks you instantly. It builds into a beautiful, half time groove reminiscent of early Adventure Club, with a euphoric taste. Ricky Rozay takes over, setting a record for only calling himself a boss once, and absolutely kills the verse

== Music video ==
The video for "When You Feel This" was filmed in Sydney, directed by Chris Lilley and Anthony Rose and released on the Stafford Brothers' VEVO account on 18 October 2015.

It features Lilley playing a dental nurse and rapping tortoise. Lilley explained "So I wanted to take the mundane life of a 30-something dental nurse and see her live out her music video fantasy. And because it's a daydream I thought it would be fun to bring the dental surgery turtle to life as a rapper. Everyone liked the idea, I got to play all the characters and I had a lot of fun making it." In an interview with Cameron Adams from news.com.au Lilley said he's been offered cameo's in various commercials. "certainly if I was smart and wanted a lot more money there’s a lot of money than there is in the music video industry which is extremely low budget. I just do it for fun, this video was so much fun.”

== Track listing ==
Digital download

1. "When You Feel This" – 3:24

Remixes EP

1. "When You Feel This" (J-Trick Remix) – 4:57
2. "When You Feel This" (Morten Remix) – 3:06
3. "When You Feel This" (9Lives Remix) – 4:57
4. "When You Feel This" (Montano & Pizzitola vs Godlov Remix) – 4:56
5. "When You Feel This" (Sikdope Remix) – 3:43

== Charts ==
Chart performance for "When You Feel This"
Chart (2015)	Peak position
Australia (ARIA)	70
