= Hello (Stafford Brothers song) =

Single by Stafford Brothers featuring Lil Wayne and Christina Milian
- Released: 18 December 2012 (US); 4 January 2013 (Australia)
- Recorded: 2012
- Genre: Dance-pop, house
- Length: 3:27
- Label: Cash Money Records, CHM Records, Universal Republic Records
- Songwriter(s): Whitney Lauren Phillips, Christina Milian, Dwayne Carter, Alex James, Harry Mikael Sommerdahl
- Producer(s): Stafford Brothers; Alex James; Harry Sommerdahl

Stafford Brothers singles chronology
"Hello" (2012)	"Wicked Child" (2013)

Lil Wayne singles chronology
"She Don't Put It Down" (2012)	"Hello" (2012)	"Love Me" (2013)

Christina Milian singles chronology
"Us Against the World" (2008)	"Hello" (2012)	"Start a Fire" (2014)

"Hello" is a song by Australian DJs and producers Stafford Brothers, which features Young Money Entertainment's Lil Wayne and Christina Milian. It was released as a single in the United States on 18 December 2012, and Australia on 4 January 2013.

The single was certified double platinum in Australia and hit number 1 on the Australian artist singles chart, dance chart, club chart and iTunes dance chart. It peaked at number 4 on the overall singles chart, spending 20 weeks inside the top 50. A remix package was released internationally on Beatport in which two of the remixes reached number 1 in their respective genres. "Hello" was the Stafford Brothers' first US release.

== Music video ==
The video for "Hello" was released on the Stafford Brothers' VEVO account on 24 May 2013. The video features Christina Milian and Lil Wayne, and was directed by Yasha Malekzad.

The setting is a pool party and features both Milian and Lil Wayne along with blow-up and real kangaroos.

== Charts ==
=== Weekly charts ===
Chart (2013)	Peak position
Australia (ARIA)	4
Global Dance Songs (Billboard)	28
US Dance Club Songs (Billboard)	11
US Hot Dance/Electronic Songs (Billboard)	31

=== Year-end charts ===
Chart (2013)	Position
Australia (ARIA)	42
Australian Artist Singles (ARIA)	4

== Certification ==
Region	Certification	Certified units/sales
Australia (ARIA)	2× Platinum	140,000^{^}
^{^} Shipments figures based on certification alone.

== Accolades ==
"Hello" was nominated for Song of the Year at the 2013 ARIA Music Awards; however, it lost to "Resolution" by Matt Corby.
