= Stafford Brothers =

US-based Australian DJ duo

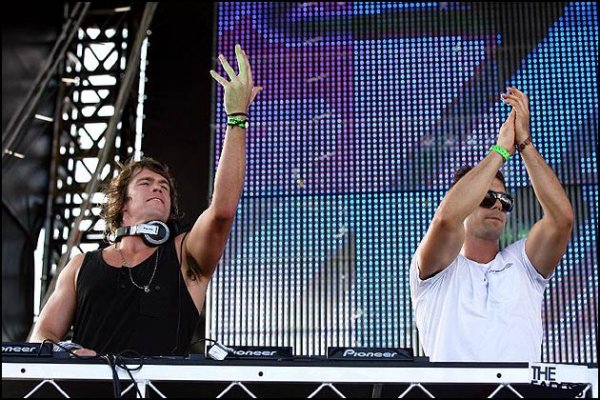
- Stafford Brothers in 2011

Background information
- Origin: Gold Coast, Queensland, Australia
- Genres: House, electro, progressive
- Occupation(s): Disk jockeys, producers, MCs, songwriters, artist managers, entrepreneurs
- Labels: Cash Money
- Website: www.staffordbrothers.com

Stafford Brothers are Australian DJs and producers from the Gold Coast, Queensland known for blending the genres of house, electro, and progressive house music. Currently based in Los Angeles, California, the brothers were the first electronic dance music act to sign to Cash Money Records - an American record label, in 2012. Stafford Brothers also have their own syndicated network TV show The Stafford Brothers, which ran in 2010 and 2011. Stafford Brothers hosted a weekly radio show on the Today Network. They have released several mixtapes, and Stafford Brothers' 2013 single "Hello" featured Lil Wayne and Christina Milian. They have been ranked as the number 1 DJs in Australia in the ITM Awards.

== History ==
=== Affiliations ===
The Stafford Brothers have produced club records for a number of labels. In December 2012, Cash Money Records co-CEO's Ronald "Slim" Williams and Bryan "Birdman" Williams announced they had signed the Stafford Brothers.

=== 2011: Real Madrid single ===
In 2011, Real Madrid C.F. commissioned the Stafford Brothers to reproduce their club anthem ‘Himno del Real Madrid’. 'Everybody (Hala Madrid)’ was released on iTunes along with an official music video featuring famous footage from Real Madrid games.

=== 2010–2011: Television series ===
In 2010, FOX8 premiered a six-part documentary titled The Stafford Brothers that followed Matt and Chris Stafford on their European Tour. The second season of the show premiered on 21 January 2011; in its final episode, the Stafford Brothers announced their plans to move to America, to pursue their international DJ career.

=== Radio shows ===
In Australia, the Stafford Brothers hosted a weekly radio show on the Today Network.

In the United States, their radio programme is hosted by Clear Channel's Evolution Radio on Saturday nights. The show has featured interviews with artists such as Nicky Romero, Thomas Gold, NERVO, Tommy Trash and Krewella.

=== 2013–2014: Ventures, recent projects ===
They have been ranked as the number 1 DJs in Australia in the ITM Awards.

The brothers were the first electronic dance music act to sign to Cash Money Records - an American record label, in 2012.

Stafford Brothers' most successful song is their 2013 double platinum selling single, "Hello" featuring Lil Wayne and Christina Milian.

On 8 June 2013 the Stafford Brothers announced an online DJ training program and website titled DJ Master Course, which was launched in September 2013. The Stafford Brothers are also partners in electronic dance music talent group 360 Agency.

== Discography ==
DJ mixes

- 2007: The Electro House Sessions (with Tommy Trash)
- 2008: The Electro House Sessions Vol. 2 (with Tommy Trash)
- 2009: Clubbers Guide Spring 2009 (with Sidney Samson and Sam La More)
- 2009: Clubbers Guide To 2009 (with Bass Kleph and The Aston Shuffle)
- 2010: Sessions Seven (with Tommy Trash and Steve Aoki)
- 2012: Season 2 Soundtrack

Notable singles

- 2013: "Hello" (featuring Lil Wayne and Christina Milian)
- 2013: "Wicked Child" (Jason Herd & Stafford Brothers featuring Sherry St.Germain)
- 2014: "This Girl" (featuring Eva Simons and T.I.)
- 2015: "When You Feel This" (featuring Rick Ross and Jay Sean)
