= Eva Simons =

Dutch singer-songwriter

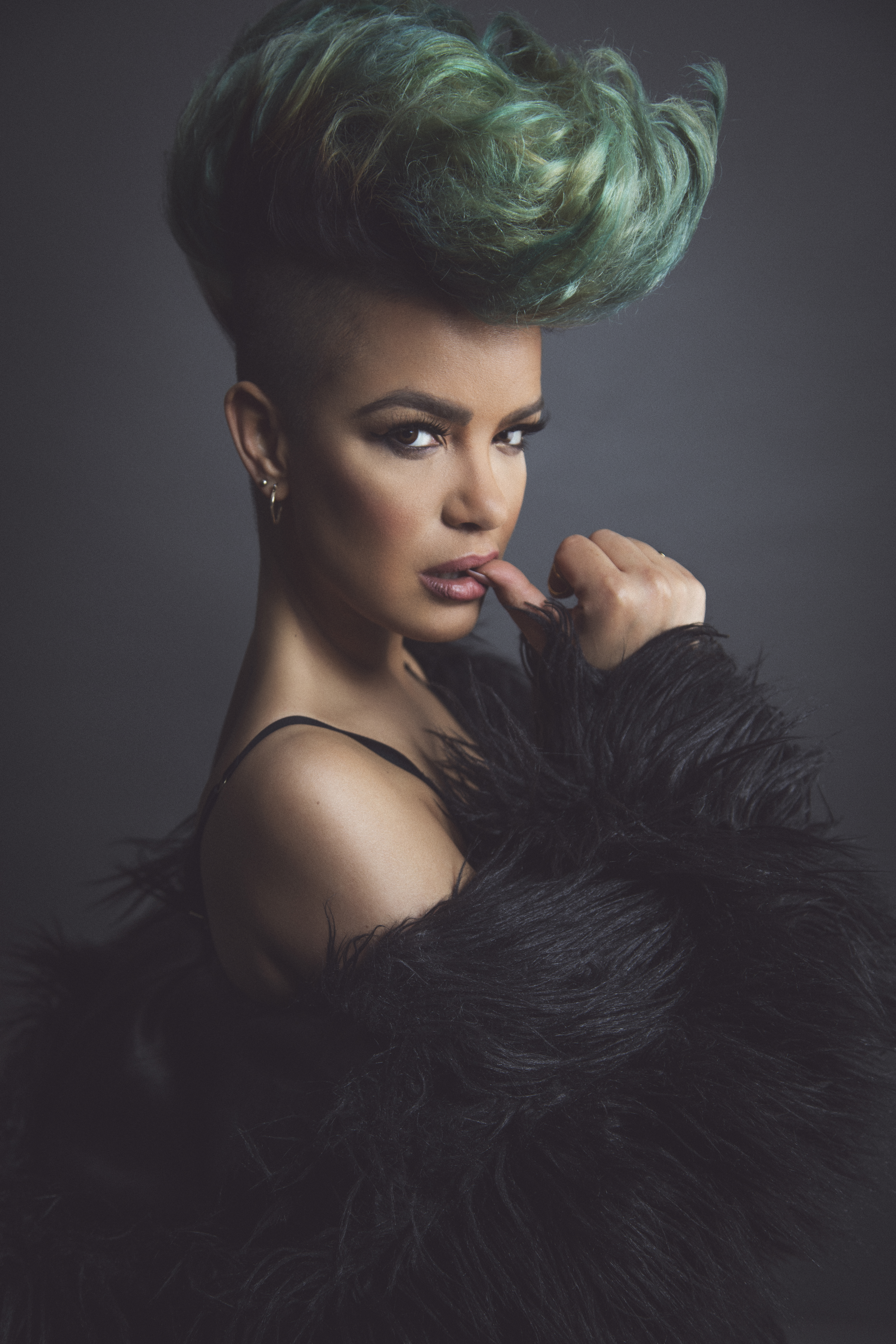
- Simons in 2016

Background information
- Born: Eva Maria Simons; Amsterdam, Netherlands
- Genres: Pop; R&B; electronic dance
- Occupations: Singer; songwriter; producer
- Instruments: Vocals; piano
- Years active: 2004–present
- Label: Unsigned
- Website: evasimons.com

Eva Maria Simons is a Dutch singer-songwriter and music video director from Amsterdam. She is best known for her song "Policeman" and collaborations with artists such as Afrojack; in 2012, Simons broke through internationally after being featured on the will.i.am single "This Is Love". During her solo career she has released 12 singles, including "Bludfire" which appeared in November 2015.

== Biography ==
=== Early life ===
Raised in Amsterdam, Simons grew up in a family of musicians. Her mother is Ingrid Simons, a backing-singer and vocalist of Surinamese origin, who worked with Paul Elstak and T-Spoon, and was also a member of pop group Say When, whose 1987 single ‘Save Me’ was later reworked into Eurodance album ‘The Rhythm of the Night’ by Corona. Her grandfather was Dutch accordionist Johnny Meijer; her father was a pianist who inspired her to take up the instrument. In her early teens she was part of Jody's Kids, an ensemble that provided vocals for production music. She is a graduate from the Conservatorium van Amsterdam. In 2001 she sang on the single "I Believe in Love" by Cooper. After graduating in 2004 she entered the Dutch version of the Popstars The Rivals competition, where she was selected as one of the five members of the band Raffish. The five-piece had a hit-single with "Plaything" and released the album How Raffish Are You? in January 2005. Two further singles from the album failed to replicate the success and over the course of the summer of the same year, Simons announced that she was leaving the group.

=== 2009–present ===
In 2009, a demo of Simons' song "Silly Boy" was leaked on YouTube generating 4 million views. It caused a degree of confusion as some mistook it for an unreleased single by Lady Gaga or Rihanna. Upon confirming her authorship, she signed an initial contract with EMI for the release of the single.

In mid-2010, Eva and Mike Hamilton (also known as the writing team Topline Ink) wrote the song “Take Over Control”. They played the idea to DJ Afrojack, who produced the hit single, which spent 6 weeks on the Billboard Top Dance Airplay Chart, topped iTunes dance charts globally, and gained Platinum status in Australia and certified Gold in the US. The song became a globally dance crossover anthem, propelling the profiles of both Eva and Afrojack worldwide.

In 2011, as well as touring across the globe, Simons went on to sign a major label US deal, and was featured on LMFAO's track "Best Night". In addition to this, she also collaborated with will.i.am on tracks for his solo album #willpower.

On 20 March 2012 Simons premiered her new single, "I Don't Like You", which was released in most countries on 26 March under Interscope Records, USA. The track is produced by Zedd. In May 2012, she joined LMFAO in their North American "Sorry For Party Rocking" tour. On 24 July 2012 Simons released her second single, "Renegade", produced by J.O.B. On 14 May 2012 will.i.am premiered his new single "This Is Love" which features Simons' vocals. The song went on to become number 1 in multiple countries including the UK, and a top 10 hit in many other countries. In October of the same year Simons received a BMI Songwriting Award for "Take Over Control".

On 21 and 22 April 2013, Simons supported Beyoncé on The Mrs. Carter Show World Tour in the Netherlands. Shortly after that was announced in March, Pepsi launched an ad campaign in the Netherlands giving customers a chance to meet Simons when she performed at Beyoncé's tour. A song by Simons named 'Chemistry' used in the advert was released in the Netherlands 22 March 2013.

On 28 January 2014 Simons released a 'bootleg' remix of the Martin Garrix track "Animals". In June 2014 she married her longtime partner Sidney Samson in Amsterdam. That summer Simons also made her acting debut in the Dutch-language film Heksen Bestaan Niet aimed at the adolescent market.

On 10 April 2015 Simons released the single titled 'Policeman' through Powerhouse Music, a dancehall song produced by Sidney Samson. It was supported by a video directed by Rigel Kilston. On 23 November 2015 Simons released the single titled Bludfire (feat. Sidney Samson) that received airplay on the Dutch radio stations Radio 538 and SLAM!.

Simons released the single "Guaya" via the label Powerhouse Music on 17 July 2017. On 6 April 2018, Simons released her single titled "The One" via 8ball Music, which was produced by Boaz van de Beatz and Ruud van Schaik. 25 January 2019 saw Simons release her single "Like That" on the dance label Spinnin' Records. She performed the song live for the first time on RTL Late Night. In 2025 she played Mary in the Dutch live event and television program The Passion.

== Discography ==
=== Albums ===
List of collaboration albums, with selected chart positions
Title	Album details	Peak chart positions
Title	Album details	NLD
How Raffish Are You? (as part of Raffish)	Released: 2005	14

=== Singles ===
List of solo singles, with selected chart positions
Title	Year	Peak chart positions							Certifications
Title	Year	NLD	AUS	AUT	BEL (WA)	FRA	GER	SPA	Certifications
"Silly Boy"	2009	32	45	55	—	—	36	—	
"I Don't Like You"	2012	—	—	—	—	—	—	—	
"Renegade"	2012	—	—	—	—	—	—	—	
"Chemistry"	2013	64	—	—	—	—	—	—	
"Celebrate the Rain"	2014	23	—	—	—	—	—	—	
"Policeman" (featuring Konshens)	2015	7	—	—	9	12	49	90	BEA: Gold; NVPI: Platinum
"Bludfire" (featuring Sidney Samson)	2015	56	—	—	34	38	—	—	
"Escape from Love" (with Sidney Samson)	2016	—	—	—	—	69	—	—	
"Heartbeat" (with Richard Orlinski)	2016	—	—	—	—	1	—	—	SNEP: Gold
"Guaya"	2017	—	—	—	—	—	—	—	
"Avalon"	2017	—	—	—	—	—	—	—	
"The One"	2018	—	—	—	—	—	—	—	
"Like That"	2019	—	—	—	—	—	—	—	
"Blessing"	2020	—	—	—	—	—	—	—	
"Christmas Will Be Better Next Year"	2020	—	—	—	—	—	—	—	
"Bebe"	2021	—	—	—	—	—	—	—	
"Baila"	2021	—	—	—	—	—	—	—	
"Tan"	2021	—	—	—	—	—	—	—	
"Close To You"	2022	—	—	—	—	—	—	—	
"Nooit Alleen (Dit Is Wat Mijn Mama Zei"	2023	—	—	—	—	—	—	—	
"—" denotes a recording that did not chart or was not released in that territory.

List of collaboration singles, with selected chart positions
Title	Year	Peak chart positions										Certifications	Album
Title	Year	NLD	AUS	AUT	BEL (WA)	CAN	FRA	GER	SPA	UK	US	Certifications	Album
"I Believe In Love" (as part of Cooper)	2000	64	—	—	—	—	—	—	—	—	—		
"Plaything" (as part of Raffish)	2004	1	—	—	—	—	—	—	—	—	—		
"Als Je Iets Kan Doen" (as part of Artiesten voor Azie)	2005	1	—	—	—	—	—	—	—	—	—		
"Thursday Child" (as part of Raffish)	2005	28	—	—	—	—	—	—	—	—	—		
"Let Go (DJ Chuckie Remix)" as part of Raffish ft. Gio	2005	27	—	—	—	—	—	—	—	—	—		
"Silly Boy" (Dave Aude Radio Version)	2009	—	—	—	—	—	—	—	—	—	—		
"Take Over Control" (Afrojack featuring Eva Simons)	2010	12	17	46	—	39	—	78	—	24	41	ARIA: Platinum; RIAA: Platinum	
"Best Night" (LMFAO featuring will.i.am, GoonRock and Eva Simons)	2011	—	—	—	—	—	—	—	—	—	—		
"This Is Love" (will.i.am featuring Eva Simons)	2012	2	7	15	2	14	2	54	9	1	— (Note: "This Is Love" did not chart on the Billboard Hot 100, but peaked at number 10 on the Bubbling Under Hot 100 Singles chart.)	ARIA: 2× Platinum; BEA: Gold; BPI: Gold	#willpower
"I Need More (Club Mix)" (Apster featuring Eva Simons)	2012	—	—	—	—	—	—	—	—	—	—		
"Let's Do It Right" (The Young Professionals featuring Eva Simons)	2014	—	—	—	—	—	—	—	—	—	—		
"Unstoppable" (R3hab featuring Eva Simons)	2014	—	—	—	—	—	—	—	—	—	—		
"This Girl" (Stafford Brothers featuring Eva Simons and T.I.)	2014	—	—	—	—	—	—	—	—	—	—		
"Policeman (Jockeyboys Remix)" (Jockeyboys featuring Eva Simons & Konshens)	2015	—	—	60	—	—	—	—	—	—	—	BVMI: Gold	
"Heartbeat (Extended Mix)" (Richard Orlinkski featuring Eva Simons)	2016	—	—	—	—	—	25	—	—	—	—		
"One + One" (Made In June featuring Eva Simons)	2018	—	—	—	—	—	—	—	—	—	—		
"Bad Boy" (Jebroer featuring Eva Simons)	2021	—	—	—	—	—	—	—	—	—	—		
"Flexin'" (Laidback Luke featuring Eva Simons)	2022	—	—	—	—	—	—	—	—	—	—		
"Desire'" (Vanco featuring Eva Simons)	2023	—	—	—	—	—	—	—	—	—	—		
"Bad Love'" (Laidback Luke featuring Eva Simons)	2023	—	—	—	—	—	—	—	—	—	—		
"Have It All'" (CHOCO featuring Eva Simons)	2023	—	—	—	—	—	—	—	—	—	—		
"Todo Mucho'" (Laidback Luke, Sevek featuring Eva Simons)	2023	—	—	—	—	—	—	—	—	—	—		
"—" denotes a recording that did not chart or was not released in that territory.

=== Other appearances ===
Title	Year	Artist(s)	Album
"Pass Out"	2009	Chris Brown	Graffiti
"Mr & Mrs Smith"	2010	M. Pokora	Mise à Jour
"What Do They Know"	2010	Roll Deep	Winner Stays On
"Pressure in the Club"	2010	DJ Snake	—N/a
"Love The Girls"	2011	Chris Brown	F.A.M.E.
"Bulletproof"	2012	Doctor P	Animal Vegetable Mineral Part 1 EP
"Circle of One"	2017	Nicky Romero	—N/a
"Pienso En El Momento"	2019	Juan Magan	4.0

== Tours ==
Opening act

- Sorry For Party Rocking Tour (2012)
- The Mrs. Carter Show World Tour (2013)
- Purpose World Tour (2016)

== Awards and nominations ==
Year	Ceremony	Category / nominated work	Result	Ref.
2012	MTV Europe Music Awards	Best Dutch Act	Nominated	
2012	BMI London Awards	Pop Songs Award "Take Over Control"	Won	
