= Beyond: Two Souls =

2013 video game

- Developer: Quantic Dream
- Publishers: Sony Computer Entertainment; Quantic Dream (PC)
- Director: David Cage
- Producer: Charles Coutier
- Designer: Sophie Buhl
- Programmer: Damien Castelltort
- Artist: Christophe Brusseaux
- Writer: David Cage
- Composer: Lorne Balfe
- Platforms: PlayStation 3; PlayStation 4; Windows
- Release: 8 October 2013: PlayStation 3; NA: 8 October 2013; PAL: 9 October 2013; UK: 11 October 2013 PlayStation 4; WW: 24 November 2015 Windows; WW: 22 July 2019
- Genres: Interactive film, action-adventure
- Modes: Single-player, multiplayer

Beyond: Two Souls is an action-adventure game developed by Quantic Dream and published by Sony Computer Entertainment. It was released on 8 October 2013 for PlayStation 3 and on 24 November 2015 for PlayStation 4. A port for Windows, self-published by Quantic Dream, was released on 22 July 2019.

The game features Jodie Holmes, one of two player characters. The other is an incorporeal entity named Aiden: a separate soul linked to Jodie since birth. Jodie, portrayed by Elliot Page, (Note: Credited as Ellen Page) possesses supernatural powers through her psychic link to Aiden, growing from adolescence to adulthood while learning to control Aiden and the powers they share. Willem Dafoe co-stars as Nathan Dawkins, a researcher in the Department of Paranormal Activity and Jodie's surrogate father figure. The actors in the game worked during the year-long project in Quantic Dream's Paris studio to perform on-set voice acting and motion-capture acting.

Beyond: Two Souls premiered at the 2013 Tribeca Film Festival, the second time the festival had recognised a video game. Writer and director David Cage said that game development studios should provide "interactive storytelling" that can be played by everyone, including non-gamers. The game received polarised critical reception upon release. It sold 2.8 million units by July 2018.

A television adaptation of the game is in development, with Page serving as a producer through his production company.

== Gameplay ==
Beyond: Two Souls is an action-adventure game, requiring the player to move and guide the character into interactions with objects and other non-player characters in the scene to progress the story. The player primarily controls Jodie through the in-game environments. At almost any time, however, the player (or second player during a two-player game) can switch to control Aiden instead. Aiden, as an incorporeal entity, exists permanently in noclip mode and can move through walls, ceilings, and other obstacles; however, he is limited to moving only within a certain radius around Jodie due to their spiritual tethering.

While playing as Jodie, the game includes interactive objects marked with a white dot, which can be interacted with by tilting the controller stick in its direction. If Jodie must perform a specific action, icons pop up on the screen to prompt the player to press and/or hold certain controller buttons. Conversation prompts float in the air, defaulting to a certain choice if too much time passes before selection. During action sequences, like chases or hand-to-hand combat, the cinematography moves into slow motion whilst Jodie performs the physical manoeuvre; during this time, the player must determine the direction Jodie is moving and push the controller stick in that direction to complete the action. Other sequences require real-time stealth, which has the player sneak Jodie through environments while coordinating certain actions with Aiden. Failing certain action sequences will alter the course of a chapter (and sometimes later chapters) and in some cases lead to the death of a non-playable character.

While playing as Aiden, the game becomes monochromatic. Amongst the shades of greys, interactive objects are highlighted by an aura shining in one of several colours, with the colour of the aura indicating his potential interaction: orange characters can be possessed, red characters strangled, blue objects (or characters with environmental effects) knocked around, and green characters healed. Jodie frequently calls upon Aiden to provide different abilities, such as form a protective shield around her, allow the dead to speak to the living through her, grant her an ability to see events of the recent past, and enable her to heal a character's wounds.

As the player makes choices throughout the game, the gameplay's plot is revealed. Besides affecting dialogue and story developments, the outcome of entire scenes (and in some cases, the outcome of scenes several chapters later) can be manipulated to a certain extent based on player choices. These choices are typically moral decisions made through Jodie's dialogue options, interventions with various characters, success or failure in her combat scenes, or psychic actions that the player chooses to have Aiden perform. Examples of choice-based outcomes are the chapter titled The Party, where the player is given the choice of unleashing brutal revenge toward a group of bullies or simply running away, and the chapter titled The Embassy, where the player can either engage in psychic information retrieval or can jeopardise the mission by forcing one of the guards to commit suicide. Choices also determine the finale of Beyond: Two Souls, as any number of possible plot endings can be experienced by the player.

== Plot ==
Young Jodie Holmes (Caroline Wolfson) lives with her foster parents in a suburban home. Since birth, Jodie has had a psychic connection with a mysterious entity named Aiden, with whom she can communicate and perform telepathic acts, such as possessing people's minds and manipulating certain objects. After an incident with some neighbourhood kids results in Aiden almost killing one of them, Jodie's foster parents seek help to care for her condition, permanently leaving her under the custody of doctors Nathan Dawkins (Willem Dafoe) and Cole Freeman (Kadeem Hardison) of the United States Department of Paranormal Activity.

Under the two doctors' care, Jodie slowly learns to control Aiden and the powers they share. During this time, Nathan and Cole are building the condenser, a portal that connects the world of the living with the world of the dead—the Infraworld. One night, Nathan learns that his wife and daughter were killed in a car accident. While trying to comfort him, Jodie discovers that she can channel spirits of the dead from the Infraworld; she helps the spirits speak to the living through a psychic link created by her physical contact. As the years pass, a teenage Jodie (Elliot Page) seeks her independence, both from the doctors and from Aiden, and tries several times to live a normal life. At each attempt, Aiden intervenes, ending in disaster.

At one point, Nathan asks for Jodie's help with the condenser, which has broken open. After braving hostile entities from the Infraworld, Jodie manages to shut down the condenser and warns Nathan not to build another. This gets the attention of the CIA, who send agent Ryan Clayton (Eric Winter) to forcibly recruit Jodie. After training, the now-adult Jodie goes on multiple missions as a field agent, often with Ryan, to whom she slowly becomes attracted. On one such mission in Somalia, Jodie is assigned to kill a warlord, only to realize afterwards that the target she killed was not a warlord, but the country's benign president. Enraged, Jodie flees in disgust, despite Ryan's pleas. Branded a traitor, Jodie becomes a fugitive, evading pursuing CIA forces. Along the way, she befriends a small group of homeless people, one of whom she helps give birth to a girl named Zoey; she later lives with a Navajo family, whom she saves from a malevolent entity. The CIA eventually recaptures Jodie after she attempts to reconnect with her catatonic biological mother, who has been held and forcibly drugged for decades in a military hospital.

The CIA hands Jodie over to Nathan, now executive director of the DPA, overseeing the DPA's newest condenser, code-named the Black Sun. He reveals that the CIA is willing to let Jodie go if she agrees to a final mission. Jodie and a CIA team led by Ryan destroy an underwater facility housing a Chinese-developed condenser before it is used to attack the United States. Jodie then learns that Nathan built a miniature condenser to speak exclusively to his family, but without success. After showing Nathan that his refusal to let them go is only making them suffer, Jodie tries to leave, only to be held in captivity by the CIA—the organisation has deemed her too dangerous to be free and intends to subject her to the same fate as her mother. The now-insane Nathan informs Jodie that he intends to shut down the containment field to the Black Sun, merging the two worlds together and making death meaningless. Too weak to free Jodie, Aiden contacts Ryan and Cole, leading them to her. After Nathan shuts down the containment field, the three chase after him into the heart of the Black Sun, with the intent of destroying it.

During the trek towards the Black Sun, Cole is injured by entities and Ryan sacrifices his own safety to keep Jodie alive. Eventually, Jodie confronts Nathan near the Black Sun. Nathan is either killed by Aiden or commits suicide to reunite with his family. As Jodie shuts down the condenser, she has a vision—Aiden is her stillborn twin brother. Jodie must make a choice: go back to the world of the living, or go on to the Infraworld and be reunited with everyone she has lost. If Jodie chooses Life, her connection to Aiden is severed and she is no longer useful to the CIA. Jodie must choose how to live her life, either alone or with Ryan, Jay, or Zoey and her family. If Jodie chooses Beyond, she joins Aiden and other lost ones in the Infraworld, dying in the process. She continues to watch over those who remain in the living world, warning the now-teenage Zoey of the coming danger. By the story's end, the Infraworld has become a widespread threat in the not-so-distant future. Jodie prepares to confront the threat.

== Development ==
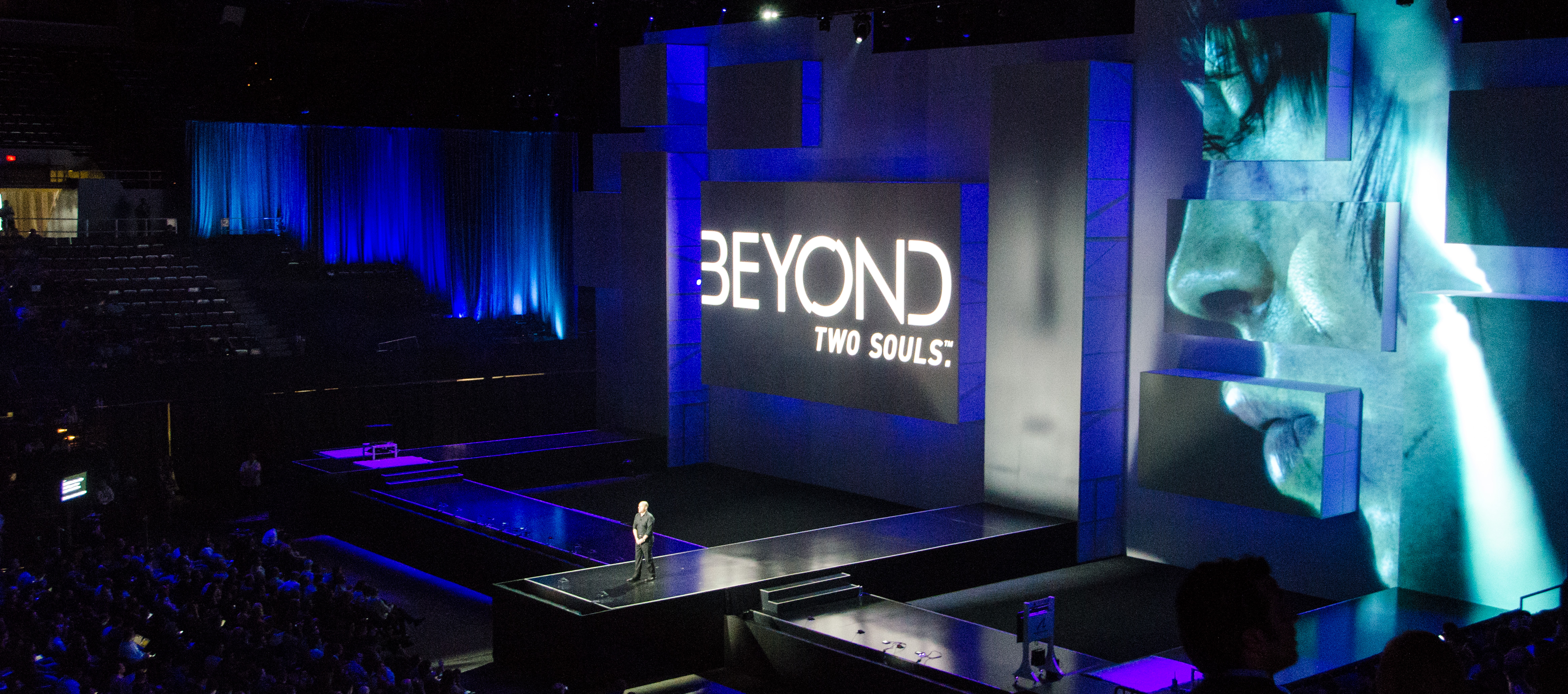
David Cage announcing Beyond: Two Souls at E3 2012

Scenes from the game: Jodie Holmes (top), Aiden's view of Nathan Dawkins and young Jodie (note his spiritual tether, middle), Willem Dafoe, David Cage, and Elliot Page working on the motion capture (bottom)

David Cage, founder and CEO of Quantic Dream, announced Beyond: Two Souls at Sony's press conference during E3 2012. He showed the crowd a debut trailer featuring the game's in-game graphics. Cage described Beyond as a "more action-driven experience" that offers "much more direct control" and "much more spectacular action" than Quantic Dream's previous game Heavy Rain. Cage has called his games "fully controllable" while admitting "when there is an action sequence, yes we integrate these quick time event sequences ... in a new way." Unlike Heavy Rain, Beyond is not PlayStation Move compatible. Earlier games created by Cage, which have been called "wrought psychological thrillers", demonstrate that emotional narrative is a critical element in a Quantic Dream game's development. The script for the game was around 2,000 pages long (an average screenplay is between 95 and 125 pages long; each page is approximately one minute of screen time). "We'd do 30, 40 pages a day. It's insane compared to a film," Page said in an interview. "Jodie goes through a lot. This is an incredibly emotional story and journey for this girl."

Quantic Dream, an advanced motion capture studio as well as video game developer, required the Beyond: Two Souls actors to perform motion-capture acting as well as on-set voice acting. Actors cast in the game worked during the year-long project in the Paris studio to perform the physical actions seen onscreen as performed by their fully realised video game graphic characters. Meanwhile, Quantic Dream programmers, artists, and animators, led by art director Christophe Brusseaux, created the computer-generated imagery seen in the game. David Cage provided writing and direction and Guillaume de Fondaumière was the executive producer.

Beyond: Two Souls is dedicated to composer Normand Corbeil, who died of pancreatic cancer on 25 January 2013. Corbeil had worked on Quantic Dream's Heavy Rain and its predecessor Fahrenheit and was unable to finish his work on Beyond. Lorne Balfe, who wrote the score for Assassin's Creed III, replaced Corbeil as the game's composer after Corbeil's death. Balfe's collaborator Hans Zimmer joined him as producer in August 2013.

On 27 April 2013, five months before the game's debut, Quantic Dream released a new trailer and demonstrated 35 minutes of the game at the 2013 Tribeca Film Festival, with both Page and Cage in attendance. This marks only the second time the film festival recognised a video game, the first being 2011's L.A. Noire. In interviews conducted immediately prior to the game's worldwide release, Cage explained that development studios like Quantic Dream have an obligation to provide "interactive storytelling" that can be played by everyone, including non-gamers.

== Release ==
On 5 September 2013, the PlayStation Blog announced that a demo for Beyond: Two Souls would be released 1 October 2013 in the United States, 2 October for Europe, and 3 October for Japan, about a week prior to the full game's worldwide release. Despite the demo's official release date, a few users of the paid subscription service PlayStation Plus were allowed to receive the demo a week earlier, on 24 September 2013. GameStop also gave out a limited number of beta keys on that day. The full game was released on 8 October 2013 in North America, 9 October 2013 in Europe, Australia and New Zealand, and 11 October 2013 in the UK.

The European version of the game is censored to keep the PEGI rating at 16 instead of 18. Two changes were made amounting to 5–10 seconds of gameplay.

Immediately after the game was released, nude images of Jodie surfaced on the Reddit online community. Jodie appears nude in a shower scene in the game, but is not fully visible. Industry analysts deduced that a person in possession of a developer PlayStation 3 that allowed quality assurance features such as "free camera" mode had created and uploaded the images. Sony immediately took steps to remove them, asking for the community's assistance, explaining that the images were of a digital model and not of Page, who has a "no nudity" policy. The images were removed from the website.

By June 2015, Quantic Dream announced a PlayStation 4 version of Beyond: Two Souls for North America, Europe, and the PAL region alongside Heavy Rain. The PlayStation 4 version of Beyond: Two Souls was released on 24 November, with the remaster of Heavy Rain following on 1 March 2016. A package containing both games was then released physically on a Blu-ray disc.

Official PC release trailer

During the 2019 Game Developers Conference in March, Epic Games announced that Quantic Dream would publish Heavy Rain, Beyond: Two Souls, and their newest game Detroit: Become Human for Windows, with the releases occurring throughout 2019. The games were exclusively available through the Epic Games Store for the duration of a year following their release before they appeared on other storefronts. A demo was made available on 27 June 2019; Beyond: Two Souls was then self-published on the store by Quantic Dream 22 July 2019.

== Reception ==
Reception

Aggregate score
Aggregator	Score
Metacritic	PS3: 70/100; PS4: 72/100; PC: 76/100

Review scores
Publication	Score
Destructoid	5/10
Electronic Gaming Monthly	7.5/10
Eurogamer	6/10
GameRevolution	4/5
GameSpot	9.0/10
GamesRadar+	3.5/5
GamesTM	8/10
IGN	6.0/10
Joystiq	2.5/5
PlayStation Official Magazine – UK	8/10
Polygon	8.0/10

Beyond: Two Souls received polarised reviews upon release. Review aggregator Metacritic described its reception as "mixed". Critics praised Page's character portrayal of Jodie Holmes and Dafoe's performance as Nathan Dawkins, as well as the amount of technical details in the game's animations and graphics. Praise was also generally given toward the elaborate motion capture, interactive storytelling mechanics, emotional soundtrack, and ability to appeal to non-gamers. PlayStation Official Magazine (UK) spoke frankly of a game using quick time events over a more acceptable solution: "you lose explicit control", yet believing Beyond ultimately wins in ways such as its imagery: "PS3's graphical high point" and Page's performance: "Astonishing ... [they're] the lynchpin that holds all the madness together with a painfully human presence." Polygon was less impressed with the game's writing, but was exhilarated about Quantic Dream's ability to "perfect a new way of telling stories" with "staggeringly great" motion capture. GameSpot called the game a "gripping adventure", observing that the gameplay's choices give the player an ability to shape what kind of person Jodie becomes, making us "care dearly for her ... and become enamoured with this young woman and her extraordinary life". Game Revolution praised the game as "uncannily gorgeous", confirming Quantic Dream remains a leader in the story-driven genre, calling their high-quality cinematic gameplay "the saving grace of Beyond: Two Souls". GamesTM labeled Page's performance as "truly breathtaking ... one of the truly great videogame acting showcases" and described Cage as "visionary; someone who believes in the power of games and of interactivity. Beyond: Two Souls is his most ambitious and complete work to date."

While Electronic Gaming Monthly praised the visuals, the performances, and the "bold, genre-defying design work", it expressed disappointment in Quantic Dream; respecting its years of "audacity" pushing the boundaries of the game medium, yet ultimately failing to listen to feedback and instead delivering yet "another flawed experiment—better in some ways, worse in others". GamesRadar+ praised the game's innovation, stunning amount of choices, and Page's performance, but warned "you'll never be truly challenged by the gameplay". IGN gaming website criticised the game for offering a gaming experience too passive and unrewarding: "It is unwise to build up our expectations of being able to choose our actions and then take that away from us where it feels most important" and a muddy and unfocused interactive drama "to make gamers conditioned to meaningless violence feel something". Joystiq criticised the game's lack of solid character interaction and its unbelievable, unintentionally silly plot. Destructoid criticised the game's thin character presentation and frequent narrative dead ends, as well as its lack of meaningful interactivity. The editor of Eurogamer took issue with the "gruelling, sentimental" game being "all story", comparing it to other games that "give the player complete control", observing the triviality of the player choices may modify the tone of each self-contained chapter, but the overall story is "going wherever it's going".

=== Sales ===
It was reported in July 2013 that Beyond: Two Souls was in the top twenty most pre-ordered games of 2013, and that by the end 2013, the game sold one million copies worldwide during its first three months of availability. The game sold over 70,000 copies in Quantic Dream's home country France during that time, more than its previous game Heavy Rain during its three-month debut. Heavy Rain's budget was $22 million and the budget for Beyond: Two Souls was $27 million, not including approximately $18 million in costs for marketing and distribution.

By July 2018, Beyond: Two Souls had sold 2.8 million copies, becoming one of the best-selling PlayStation 3 video games.

=== Legacy ===
In November 2014, David Cage discussed the future of video games and referred to the constant changes occurring within the gaming industry. "There will always be games for the hardcore gamers who see games as a skill-based sport, or as a way to compete with their friends", he said. He also referred to casual gamers who play games "as a mere hobby, like many titles for smartphones". He then stated, "We try to develop a middle way, with games that try to tell a story, to carry meaning, and where violence isn't the core activity. Most of all, we try to create an emotion, to make players live something strong and unique, which remains an ambitious challenge in a video game."

=== Accolades ===
Year	Award	Category	Nominee(s)	Result	Ref.
2012	Destructoid's Best of E3 2012	Best PlayStation 3 Game	Beyond: Two Souls	Nominated	
2012	Destructoid's Best of E3 2012	Game of the Show	Beyond: Two Souls	Nominated	
2012	Digital Spy's Best of E3 Awards	Best New Game	Beyond: Two Souls	Runner-up	
2012	Electronic Gaming Monthly Presents: The Best of E3 2012	Best Adventure Game	Beyond: Two Souls	Won	
2012	Electronic Gaming Monthly Presents: The Best of E3 2012	Best PS3 Game	Beyond: Two Souls	Nominated	
2012	Electronic Gaming Monthly Presents: The Best of E3 2012	Biggest Surprise of E3	Beyond: Two Souls	Nominated	
2012	Electronic Gaming Monthly Presents: The Best of E3 2012	Game of the Show	Beyond: Two Souls	Nominated	
2012	Eurogamer's Best of E3 2012	Best Game Announcement	Beyond: Two Souls	Nominated	
2012	Eurogamer's Best of E3 2012	Best Video	Beyond: Two Souls	Won	
2012	Eurogamer's Best of E3 2012	Game of the Show	Beyond: Two Souls	Nominated	
2012	Game Critics Awards	Best Action/Adventure Game	Beyond: Two Souls	Nominated	
2012	Game Critics Awards	Best Original Game	Beyond: Two Souls	Nominated	
2012	GameSpot's Best of E3 Awards	Best of E3	Beyond: Two Souls	Won	
2012	GamesRadar+'s Best of E3 2012	Best Elliot Page	Jodie from Beyond	Won	
2012	GamesRadar+'s Best of E3 2012	Best Non-Sequel	Beyond: Two Souls	Runner-up	
2012	GamesRadar+'s Best of E3 2012	Most Valuable Game Award	Beyond: Two Souls	Won	
2012	GameTrailers's Best of E3 2012 Awards	Best Graphics	Beyond: Two Souls	Nominated	
2012	IGN's Best of E3 2012 Awards	Best Action Game	Beyond: Two Souls	Nominated	
2012	IGN's Best of E3 2012 Awards	Best New Franchise	Beyond: Two Souls	Nominated	
2012	IGN's Best of E3 2012 Awards	Best Overall Game	Beyond: Two Souls	Nominated	
2012	IGN's Best of E3 2012 Awards	Best PS3 Game	Beyond: Two Souls	Nominated	
2012	PlayStation Universe's E3 2012 Awards	Best Game	Beyond: Two Souls	Runner-up	
2012	Polygon's E3 2012	Editor's Choice	Beyond: Two Souls	Won	
2012	The Daily Telegraph's E3 2012: Best in show	Game most likely to win an Oscar	Beyond: Two Souls	Won	
2013	Behind the Voice Actors Awards	Best Female Vocal Performance in a Video Game	Elliot Page	Nominated	
2013	Business Insider's 15 Video Games From 2013 Everyone Should Play		Beyond: Two Souls	Won	
2013	Canada.com's Top video games of 2013	PlayStation 3 Game of the Year	Beyond: Two Souls	Won	
2013	Destructoid's Best of 2013	Best Console Exclusive	Beyond: Two Souls	Nominated	
2013	Eurogamer's Readers' Top 50 Games of 2013		Beyond: Two Souls	Nineteenth	
2013	Game Critics Awards	Best Console Game	Beyond: Two Souls	Nominated	
2013	GameSpot's Editors' Top 10 Lists	Chris Watters' Top 10 Games For 2013	Beyond: Two Souls	Fifth	
2013	GameSpot's Editors' Top 10 Lists	Zorine Te's Top 10 Games For 2013	Beyond: Two Souls	Ninth	
2013	GameSpot's Editors' Top 10 Lists	Tom Mc Shea's Top 10 Games For 2013	Beyond: Two Souls	Ninth	
2013	GameSpot's Editors' Top 10 Lists	Jess McDonell's Top 10 Games For 2013	Beyond: Two Souls	Ninth	
2013	Hardcore Gamer's Game of the Year Awards 2013	Best New Character	Jodie Holmes	Nominated	
2013	Hardcore Gamer's Game of the Year Awards 2013	Best PS3 Game	Beyond: Two Souls	Nominated	
2013	Hardcore Gamer's Game of the Year Awards 2013	Best Voice Acting	Beyond: Two Souls	Nominated	
2013	Hardcore Gamer's Game of the Year Awards 2013	Best Writing	Beyond: Two Souls	Nominated	
2013	Hardcore Gamer's Game of the Year Awards 2013	Editor's Choice: Kevin's Top 10 Games of 2013	Beyond: Two Souls	Seventh	
2013	Hardcore Gamer's Game of the Year Awards 2013	Editor's Choice: Lee's Top 10 Games of 2013	Beyond: Two Souls	Sixth	
2013	Hardcore Gamer's Game of the Year Awards 2013	Editor's Choice: Steve's Top 10 Games of 2013	Beyond: Two Souls	Third	
2013	HuffPost's 10 Best Video Games Of 2013		Beyond: Two Souls	Ninth	
2013	Ping Awards	Best Console Game	Beyond: Two Souls	Nominated	
2013	Ping Awards	Best Graphics	Beyond: Two Souls	Won	
2013	Ping Awards	Innovation Award	Beyond: Two Souls	Won	
2013	Slant Magazine's 25 Best Video Games of 2013	Best Video Game	Beyond: Two Souls	Seventeenth	
2013	PlayStation Awards	Users' Choice Award	Beyond: Two Souls	Won	
2013	Spike Video Game Awards	Best Voice Actor	Willem Dafoe	Nominated	
2013	Spike Video Game Awards	Best Voice Actress	Elliot Page	Nominated	
2013	The Daily Telegraph Video Game Awards 2013	Best Performer	Elliot Page	Nominated	
2013	The Globe and Mail's The best video games you'll be playing in 2013		Beyond: Two Souls	Sixth	
2013	TSA Overall Game of the Year 2013		Beyond: Two Souls	Fourth	
2013	USA Today's Best video games for teens and adults		Beyond: Two Souls	Nominated	
2014	British Academy Games Awards	Best Artistic Achievement	John Rostron, David Cage, Guillaume de Fondaumière	Nominated	
2014	British Academy Games Awards	Best Original Music	Lorne Balfe	Nominated	
2014	British Academy Games Awards	Best Performer	Elliot Page	Nominated	
2014	17th Annual D.I.C.E. Awards	Outstanding Achievement in Animation	Beyond: Two Souls	Nominated	
2014	17th Annual D.I.C.E. Awards	Outstanding Achievement in Original Music Composition	Beyond: Two Souls	Nominated	
2014	17th Annual D.I.C.E. Awards	Outstanding Achievement in Story	Beyond: Two Souls	Nominated	
2014	G.A.N.G. Awards	Audio of the Year	Beyond: Two Souls	Nominated	
2014	G.A.N.G. Awards	Best Soundtrack Album	Beyond: Two Souls	Won	
2014	G.A.N.G. Awards	Best Dialogue	Beyond: Two Souls	Nominated	
2014	International Film Music Critics Association Awards	Best Original Score for a Video Game or Interactive Media	Beyond: Two Souls	Nominated	
2014	National Academy of Video Game Trade Reviewers Awards	Animation	Beyond: Two Souls	Nominated	
2014	National Academy of Video Game Trade Reviewers Awards	Camera Direction in a Game Engine	Beyond: Two Souls	Nominated	
2014	National Academy of Video Game Trade Reviewers Awards	Control Design (3D)	Beyond: Two Souls	Nominated	
2014	National Academy of Video Game Trade Reviewers Awards	Game, Original Adventure	Beyond: Two Souls	Won	
2014	National Academy of Video Game Trade Reviewers Awards	Graphics (Technical)	Beyond: Two Souls	Nominated	
2014	National Academy of Video Game Trade Reviewers Awards	Lead Performance in a Drama	Elliot Page	Nominated	
2014	National Academy of Video Game Trade Reviewers Awards	Lighting/Texturing	Beyond: Two Souls	Nominated	
2014	National Academy of Video Game Trade Reviewers Awards	Supporting Performance in a Drama	Willem Dafoe	Nominated	
2014	National Academy of Video Game Trade Reviewers Awards	Use of Sound (New IP)	Beyond: Two Souls	Nominated	
2014	National Academy of Video Game Trade Reviewers Awards	Writing in a Drama	David Cage	Nominated	
2014	Satellite Awards	Outstanding Action/Adventure Video Game	Beyond: Two Souls	Nominated	

== Television adaptation ==
In January 2025, it was announced that Pageboy Productions, Elliot Page’s production company, had acquired the rights to adapt Beyond: Two Souls into a television series, with Page set to produce.
