= The Nomad Soul =

1999 adventure game

- Developer: Quantic Dream
- Publisher: Eidos Interactive
- Director: David Cage
- Producers: Olivier Demangel; Anne Devouassoux; Herve Albertazzi; Tom Marx
- Designers: Loic Normand; Philip Campbell
- Programmers: Olivier Nallet; Fabien Fessard
- Artists: Stephane Elbaz; Philippe Aballea; Tony Lejuez
- Writer: David Cage
- Composers: David Bowie; Reeves Gabrels; Xavier Despas
- Platforms: Windows, Dreamcast
- Release: Windows; NA: 1 November 1999; EU: 5 November 1999; AU: 19 November 1999; Dreamcast; NA: 22 June 2000; EU: 23 June 2000; AU: 30 June 2000
- Genre: Adventure
- Mode: Single-player

The Nomad Soul (known as Omikron: The Nomad Soul in North America) is an adventure game developed by Quantic Dream and published by Eidos Interactive. It was released for Microsoft Windows in 1999 and Dreamcast in 2000. The player can engage in unarmed and armed combat, explore the three-dimensional environment of Omikron City, and talk with non-player characters to progress the story. It follows an investigation into a case of serial killings, which unravels the supernatural truth behind the city's ancient history.

Director David Cage began writing the script in 1994 and signed a publishing deal with Eidos in 1997. David Bowie made the music with Reeves Gabrels, producing ten original songs. The game was finished after two-and-a-half years. Reviewers praised the graphics, soundtrack, story, character models, reincarnation mechanic, voice acting, and combat, but criticised the controls, loading times, and multiple gameplay styles. It was nominated for various awards and sold over 600,000 copies, with low sales in North America. A sequel was planned but cancelled.

== Gameplay ==
A fight sequence in side-on view

The Nomad Soul is an adventure game played from third-person and side-on perspectives in unarmed combat, and first-person view in armed fighting. The player may explore the three-dimensional environment of Omikron by walking, running, using vehicles known as Sliders, or taking elevators to reach apartments and offices. Combat, speed, dodging, and resistance to damage improve with practice. The fighting controls allow the player to strafe, jump, crouch, punch, and kick. Special moves can be performed through certain combinations. To cross bodies of water, swimming sequences can be triggered, which expends oxygen. Physical exertion depletes energy, which is repleted with Medikits, food, drinks, or special potions. In the event of death (and eventually at will), the player is reincarnated into the body of the first non-player character (NPC) that interacts with them; there are more than forty people to inhabit. Mana levels signify the ability to cast spells and are increased with potions.

Reading messages, talking to NPCs, and collecting items is crucial for the player to progress. They are provided with a computer terminal known as SNEAK, which is mostly used to access character information, call Sliders, open the inventory, and retrieve facts that are vital to story progression. Objects can be used, examined, and stored in the inventory. Magic rings allow the player to save the game at special points and buy advice for key information about NPCs to advance the story. Seteks, Omikronian currency, can be spent on things like consumables, better weapons, and advice. If the SNEAK inventory is full, items can be transferred or deposited into the Multiplan Virtual Locker, a larger inventory.

== Synopsis ==
=== Setting ===
The Nomad Soul is set in a futuristic city known as Omikron, which is a densely populated metropolis on the world of Phaenon. Omikron exists beneath an enormous crystal dome, which was constructed to protect against the ice age that Phaenon entered into after its sun's extinction. The city is split into different sectors: Anekbah, Qalisar, Jaunpur, Jahangir, and Lahoreh. Because it is forbidden for the inhabitants to leave their respective sectors, each area has developed independently, which is reflected by the divergent lifestyles and architecture.

=== Plot ===
At the start of the game, the player is asked by an Omikronian police officer named Kay'l 669 to leave their dimension and enter Omikron within his body. After doing so, the player continues with the investigation of serial killings that Kay'l and his partner were originally working on. The player begins the investigation in the Anekbah sector, where they uncover information that suggests the serial killer they are looking for is not human, but actually a demon. Members of an apparent underground, anti-government movement contact the player and confirm their suspicions. The investigation deepens and uncovers further information; one of Omikron's chief police commanders, Commandant Gandhar, is a demon pretending to be human and luring human souls into Omikron from other dimensions by way of The Nomad Soul. Kay'l 669 asking the player to help him turned out to be a trap: supposedly, if the in-game character dies, the real human playing the video game will lose their soul forever. Despite many assassination attempts on the protagonist's life by other demons working behind the scenes, the player destroys Gandhar with supernatural weaponry.

After this brief victory, the anti-government movement is revealed to be named "The Awakened", who invite the player to join them. They work in tandem with an ancient religious order led by Boz, a mystical being that exists in purely electronic form on the computer networks of Omikron. The Awakened refer to the protagonist as the "Nomad Soul", since they have the ability to change bodies at will. The Nomad Soul learns afterwards that what is going on in Omikron is merely an extension of an old battle between mankind and demons spearheaded by the powerful Astaroth. Astaroth, who was banished to the depths of Omikron long ago, is slowly regenerating power while using demons to both collect souls and impersonate high members of the government. The Nomad Soul harnesses ancient, magical technology in order to destroy Astaroth. They return to their own dimension, and prevent their soul from being captured by demons.

== Development and release ==
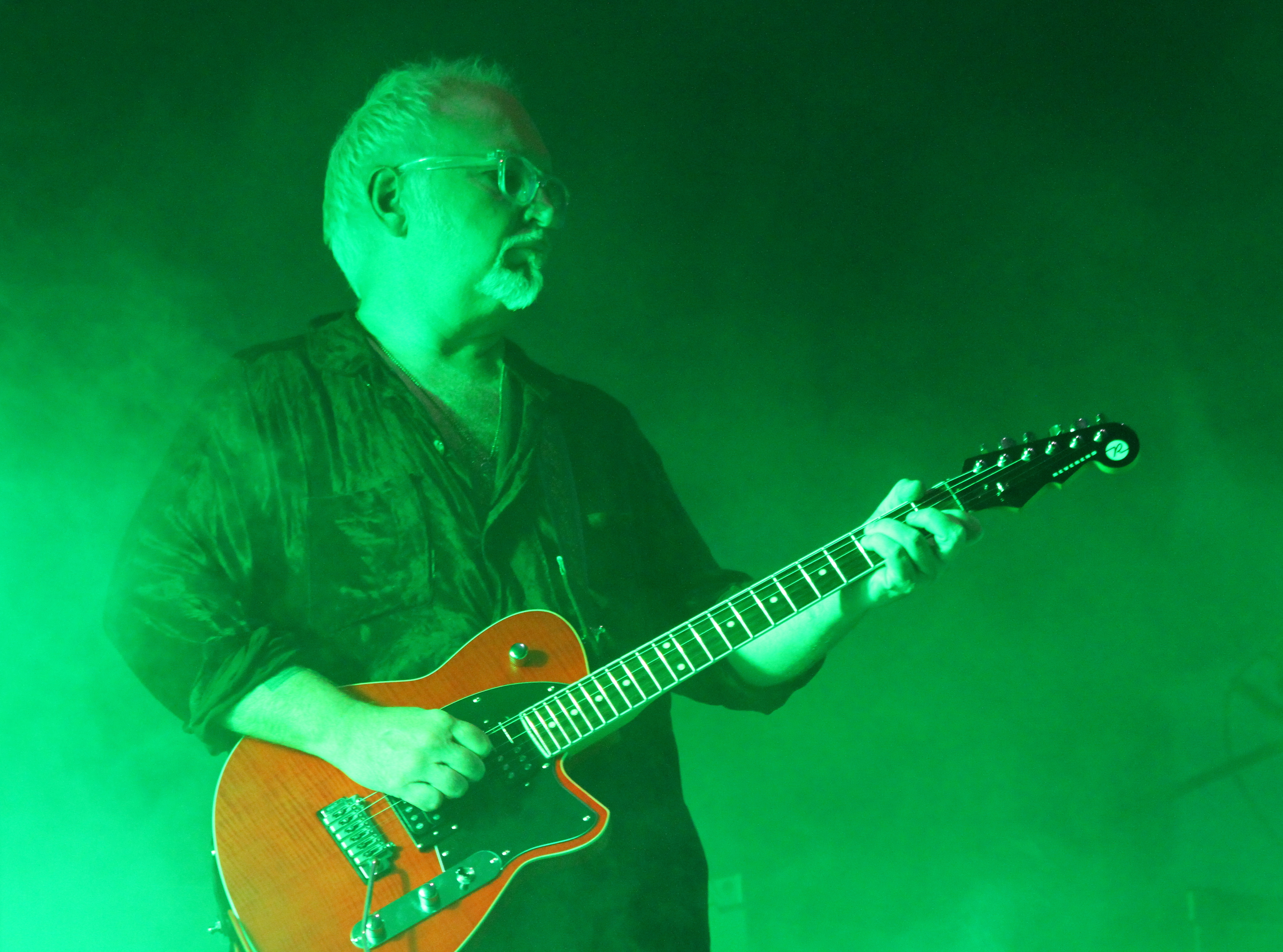
Reeves Gabrels (pictured in 2012)

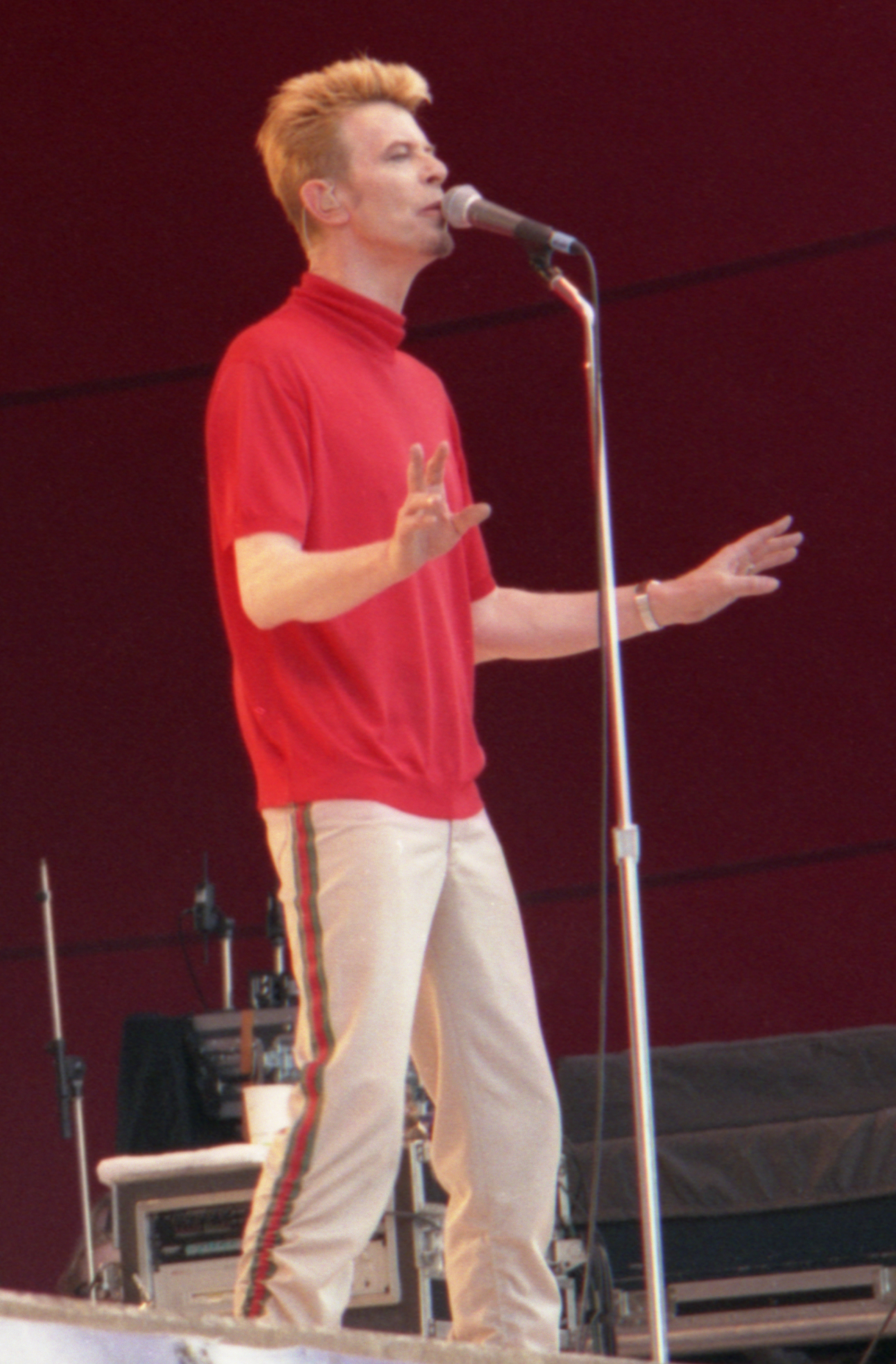
David Bowie (pictured in 1997)

Director David Cage, having grown tired of his 15-year-long career as a composer, started writing The Nomad Soul in 1994. The script resulted in a 200-page document, which was distributed to his contacts in the music business, who said the idea was "technically impossible". In an act of defiance, Cage hired a team of friends (Note: The number has both been reported as five and six.) with development experience and turned one of his isolation booths into an office. They had a deadline of six months until the money ran out, by which time the goal was to have a game engine and prototype. In the last week, (Note: The year this occurred was 1997.) Cage travelled to London and called Eidos Interactive, who invited him for a meeting. Eidos was so impressed with the demonstration and script that the publishing deal was signed by noon the next day. The Nomad Soul entered full production one month later. Two months after that, a prototype was displayed at the Electronic Entertainment Expo.

With The Nomad Soul, Cage wanted to create "a movie-like experience - with total immersion" and mix multiple genres. He was initially hesitant to introduce a first-person perspective as it gave him headaches, but implemented it at Eidos' request. Cage had written down names of artists he wanted to work with, including Björk, Massive Attack, Archive, and David Bowie. At the behest of Eidos' senior designer Philip Campbell, Bowie was ultimately solicited for the music, which was done with assistance from guitarist Reeves Gabrels. Bowie produced ten original songs and spent two weeks in Paris for design sessions. He portrayed a character named Boz and the lead singer of an in-game band playing gigs around Omikron City; Gabrels and musician Gail Ann Dorsey also lent their likenesses. Cage spent thirty hours doing motion capture for each concert. Bowie's priority was to imbue the game with "emotional subtext" and regarded this as a success. Fashion model Iman, Bowie's wife, played a character the player can reincarnate into. Xavier Despas composed ambient and additional tracks. The game took two-and-a-half years to complete.

The Nomad Soul was renamed Omikron: The Nomad Soul in North America. It was released for Microsoft Windows on 1 November 1999 in North America, on 5 November in Europe, and on 19 November in Australia. The game was ported for the Dreamcast, with release dates reported for 22 June (NA), 23 June (EU), and 30 June 2000 (AU). It sold more than 600,000 copies, between 400,000 and 500,000 of which came from Europe. Cage blamed the low sales in North America on Eidos' lack of support in that market. A PlayStation version, planned for May 2000, was cancelled after seventy percent of it had been completed. The game was also cancelled for PlayStation 2. After Bowie's death in 2016, The Nomad Soul was made available at no cost for one week.

== Reception ==
Reception

Aggregate score
Aggregator	Score	
Aggregator	Dreamcast	PC
GameRankings	66%	75%

Review scores
Publication	Score	
Publication	Dreamcast	PC
AllGame	3.5/5	4.5/5
Eurogamer	N/A	7/10
GamePro	3.5/5	4/5
GameRevolution	N/A	A
GameSpot	5.2/10	6/10
IGN	6.7/10	8.5/10
PC Gamer (US)	N/A	68%

The Nomad Soul was nominated as the best personal computer adventure game of 1999 by CNET Gamecenter, The Electric Playground, and GameSpot, losing variously to Gabriel Knight 3, Spy Fox 2, and Outcast. It was also nominated for "Outstanding Achievement in Character or Story Development" during the 3rd Annual Interactive Achievement Awards in 2000, losing to Age of Empires II: The Age of Kings and Thief: The Dark Project (both of which tied for the award).

Reviewing the Dreamcast version, Glenn Wigmore of AllGame held the game to be "unique", writing that the execution of its real-time graphics was done well and that, ultimately, "the game looks solid and creates the atmosphere of a giant, dark, and tangible world". He enjoyed the characters' varied, fleshed out demeanour, and good voice acting. The combat also appealed to Wigmore, who called it "fun". AllGame's Chris Couper said in his PC review that The Nomad Soul was "by leaps, bounds and great units of measurement, [his] favorite game of 1999". He regarded the story as "fascinating", the graphics as "amazing", and the soundtrack as "breathtaking". The most innovative part of the game, according to Couper, was that it allowed the player to reincarnate into other characters' bodies. Eurogamer was impressed with Omikron's atmospheric, "futuristic cityscape", thinking well of the general story. Game Revolution declared The Nomad Soul the first game to approach total immersion, thus calling it the "best single player gaming experience" of 1999. Game Revolution termed the story "deeply engaging", the ability to solve individual problems through multiple paths "refreshing", the graphical effects "simply gorgeous", the character models "striking", and sound effects and voice acting "generally excellent". The in-game movie sequences were similarly praised. Like Couper, Game Revolution liked the musical score, dubbing it "atmospheric". GamePro, evaluating it on the Dreamcast, was pleased with the setting and music. Having played the PC version, GamePro's Nash Werner observed that, at its best, the game was "a fresh approach to a neglected adventure-gaming genre". He likened the graphics to Blade Runner and Tim Burton's art style, deemed the score to be "incredible" and key to the atmosphere, and considered the gameplay "smooth". Ryan Mac Donald, writing the Dreamcast review for GameSpot, found the story good enough to maintain the player's interest throughout. He saw the controls as "adequate" and agreed that the game boasted "impressive" graphics as well as a "wonderful" soundtrack. Greg Kasavin's PC review, also for GameSpot, admired the character models, their realistic portrayal of emotion, and voice acting. Kasavin additionally liked the graphics engine for its high-quality rendering of enemies, weapon effects, and architecture in first-person view. IGN's Jeremy Dunham reviewed the Dreamcast version, which he noted as a "unique experience", saying the graphics looked better than on the PC. He praised the soundtrack, calling it like "something out of a modern-day cyber punk flick". He also echoed Couper's view that the reincarnation mechanic was one of the game's most innovative features. Vincent Lopez's PC review at IGN lauded the "fun, but simple" first-person mode, preferring unarmed combat for its combos and animation. What impressed him the most was the adult manner in which he felt the story was handled. He too saw the graphics as "incredible"; the soundtrack was similarly commended. Greg Vederman of PC Gamer thought the gameplay was fun, especially the third-person exploration.

Conversely, Wigmore noted that some details were "a tad rough", while also faulting the "low" colour palette. He blamed the character's lack of agility on "sluggish" controls and deducted the game for its lengthy loading times. Eurogamer criticised the uniformity of the NPCs, vehicles, and artificial intelligence. Like Wigmore, Eurogamer disliked the controls, which were found to worsen the first-person sequences. Also subject to reproval were the save game system, "pretentious silliness" in the narrative, reincarnation mechanic, substandard graphics, and "blocky and often poorly animated" character models. Despite lauding the story, Game Revolution admitted it was "a little clichéd", while also decrying armed and unarmed combat as "noticeably low on flash" compared to other games. GamePro disparaged the execution of the game modes, agreeing with others on the "universally awkward" controls. Loading "hiccups" were also disapproved of. Werner stated that, at its worst, The Nomad Soul was "your typical puzzle hunt with non-player characters that can often be annoying". He thought the models were "blocky" and their textures "murky" or "blurry". Donald noted that Quantic Dream's incorporation of various styles was a failure and became disillusioned with the promise of an immersive world, judging it instead as "little more than a polygonal prop". The action sequences were criticised for their repetitiveness. Kasavin took the same view as Donald on the implementation of multiple gameplay styles, calling them "ineffective". He questioned the originality of the world, considered the character animations "stilted and unrealistic", dismissed the unarmed combat as "silly" compared to other fighting games, and diverged from others on the soundtrack, saying it lacked variety. Dunham wrote that The Nomad Soul was best described as "Messiah and Shenmue's illegitimate child", disregarding the Dreamcast version as an "obviously rushed" port. Though initially impressed with the reincarnation mechanic, he grew tired of it near the end. Lopez mentioned the frame rate as one "serious problem" he encountered, especially in first-person mode. Vederman stated that the first-person and side-on segments looked and played "rather poorly".

== Sequel ==
By January 2000, a sequel was in the early stages of development, then scheduled to be released by 2001. It went under the titles Nomad Soul: Exodus and Omikron 2: Karma and was planned for Microsoft Windows, PlayStation 3, and Xbox 360. After the release of Fahrenheit, the project was still in discussion, but ultimately scrapped in favour of Heavy Rain.

== Legacy ==
In December 2021, shortly after the emergence of the SARS-CoV-2 Omicron variant, a cutscene featuring David Bowie's character encouraging a government uprising went viral on Twitter, leading to a resurgence in popularity thanks to the game's North America title, themes, and storyline. Misinformation on Bill Gates' being involved in the game began to spread in an attempt to connect it with conspiracy theories that he was responsible for the virus.
