= 17th Annual D.I.C.E. Awards =

Video game award ceremony

- Date: February 6, 2014
- Venue: Hard Rock Hotel and Casino
- Country: Las Vegas, Nevada, USA
- Hosted by: Felicia Day and Freddie Wong

Highlights
- Most awards: The Last of Us (10)
- Most nominations: The Last of Us (13)
- Game of the Year: The Last of Us
- Hall of Fame: Sam Houser, Dan Houser, and Leslie Benzies
- Pioneer: Eugene Jarvis

The 17th Annual D.I.C.E. Awards was the 17th edition of the D.I.C.E. Awards, an annual awards event that honored the best games in the video game industry during 2013. The awards were arranged by the Academy of Interactive Arts & Sciences (AIAS), and were held at the Hard Rock Hotel and Casino in Las Vegas, Nevada on February 6, 2014. It was also held as part of the Academy's 2014 D.I.C.E. Summit, and was hosted by Felicia Day and Freddie Wong.

The craft awards for "Online Gameplay" and "Connectivity" were dropped, and the category for "Online Game of the Year" was reintroduced as a "Game of the Year" award. The award for "Web Based Game of the Year" was offered, but no finalists were named for the category.

The Last of Us received the most nominations and won the most awards, including "Game of the Year". Sony Computer Entertainment published the most nominated games, and had the most nominations and awards as a publisher. Electronic Arts had the most award-winning games. Nintendo EAD was the only developer with more than one award-winning game.

Rockstar Games co-founders Sam Houser and Dan Houser, along with Leslie Benzies, former president of Rockstar North, were inducted into the Academy of Interactive Arts & Sciences Hall of Fame. Eugene Jarvis, programmer behind arcade games Defender and Robotron: 2084, received the "Pioneer Award".

== Winners and Nominees ==
Winners are listed first, highlighted in boldface, and indicated with a double dagger (‡).

=== Game of the Year awards ===
**Game of the Year**: **The Last of Us** — **Naughty Dog**, **Sony Computer Entertainment**‡; Assassin's Creed IV: Black Flag — Ubisoft Montreal; BioShock Infinite — Irrational Games, 2K Games; Grand Theft Auto V — Rockstar North; The Legend of Zelda: A Link Between Worlds — Nintendo EAD	**Downloadable Game of the Year**: **Brothers: A Tale of Two Sons** — **Starbreeze Studios**, **505 Games**‡; Far Cry 3: Blood Dragon — Ubisoft Montreal; Gone Home — Fullbright; Papers, Please — 3909; The Stanley Parable — Galactic Café
**Handheld Game of the Year**: **The Legend of Zelda: A Link Between Worlds** — **Nintendo EAD**‡; Fire Emblem Awakening — Intelligent Systems, Nintendo; Luigi's Mansion: Dark Moon — Next Level Games, Nintendo; Pokémon X and Y — Game Freak, Nintendo; Tearaway — Media Molecule, Sony Computer Entertainment	**Mobile Game of the Year**: **Plants vs. Zombies 2** — **PopCap Games**, **Electronic Arts**‡; Fetch — Big Fish Studios; Flick Kick Football Legends — PikPok; Ridiculous Fishing — Vlambeer; The Wolf Among Us — Telltale Games
**Online Game of the Year**: **World of Tanks** — **Wargaming**‡; Battlefield 4 — DICE, Electronic Arts; Borderlands 2 — Gearbox Software, 2K Games; Diablo III — Blizzard Entertainment; The Last of Us — Naughty Dog, Sony Computer Entertainment	**Outstanding Innovation in Gaming**: **The Last of Us** — **Naughty Dog**, **Sony Computer Entertainment**‡; Grand Theft Auto V — Rockstar North; Papers, Please — 3909; Tearaway — Media Molecule, Sony Computer Entertainment; The Stanley Parable — Galactic Café

=== Craft awards ===
**Outstanding Achievement in Game Direction**: **The Last of Us** — **Naughty Dog**, **Sony Computer Entertainment**‡; Brothers: A Tale of Two Sons — Starbreeze Studios, 505 Games; Grand Theft Auto V — Rockstar North; Papers, Please — 3909; Tearaway — Media Molecule, Sony Computer Entertainment
**Outstanding Achievement in Animation**: **The Last of Us** — **Naughty Dog**, **Sony Computer Entertainment**‡; Assassin's Creed IV: Black Flag — Ubisoft Montreal; Beyond: Two Souls — Quantic Dream, Sony Computer Entertainment; Puppeteer — SCE Japan Studio; Rayman Fiesta Run — Ubisoft Casablanca	**Outstanding Achievement in Art Direction**: **The Last of Us** — **Naughty Dog**, **Sony Computer Entertainment**‡; BioShock Infinite — Irrational Games, 2K Games; Puppeteer — SCE Japan Studio; Rayman Legends — Ubisoft Montpellier; Tearaway — Media Molecule, Sony Computer Entertainment
**Outstanding Character Performance**: **Ellie** **(The Last of Us)** — **Naughty Dog**, **Sony Computer Entertainment**‡; Trevor Philips (Grand Theft Auto V) — Rockstar North; Marius Titus (Ryse: Son of Rome) — Crytek, Microsoft Studios; Joel (The Last of Us) — Naughty Dog, Sony Computer Entertainment; Narrator (The Stanley Parable) — Galactic Café	**Outstanding Achievement in Original Music Composition**: **BioShock Infinite** — **Irrational Games**, **2K Games**‡; Beyond: Two Souls — Quantic Dream, Sony Computer Entertainment; Puppeteer — SCE Japan Studio; Rain — Acquire, SCE Japan Studio; Rayman Legends — Ubisoft Montpellier
**Outstanding Achievement in Sound Design**: **The Last of Us** — **Naughty Dog**, **Sony Computer Entertainment**‡; Battlefield 4 — DICE, Electronic Arts; BioShock Infinite — Irrational Games, 2K Games; God of War: Ascension — SCE Santa Monica Studio; Grand Theft Auto V — Rockstar North	**Outstanding Achievement in Story**: **The Last of Us** — **Naughty Dog**, **Sony Computer Entertainment**‡; Beyond: Two Souls — Quantic Dream, Sony Computer Entertainment; BioShock Infinite — Irrational Games, 2K Games; The Novelist — Orthogonal Games; Tomb Raider — Crystal Dynamics, Square Enix Europe
**Outstanding Achievement in Gameplay Engineering**: **Grand Theft Auto V** — **Rockstar North**‡; Assassin's Creed IV: Black Flag — Ubisoft Montreal; Forza Motorsport 5 — Turn 10 Studios, Microsoft Studios; Super Mario 3D World — Nintendo EAD; The Last of Us — Naughty Dog, Sony Computer Entertainment	**Outstanding Achievement in Visual Engineering**: **The Last of Us** — **Naughty Dog**, **Sony Computer Entertainment**‡; Assassin's Creed IV: Black Flag — Ubisoft Montreal; Battlefield 4 — DICE, Electronic Arts; Grand Theft Auto V — Rockstar North; Ryse: Son of Rome — Crytek, Microsoft Studios

=== Genre awards ===
**Action Game of the Year**: **BioShock Infinite** — **Irrational Games**, **2K Games**‡; Battlefield 4 — DICE, Electronic Arts; Dead Rising 3 — Capcom Vancouver, Microsoft Studios; DmC: Devil May Cry — Ninja Theory, Capcom; Resogun — Housemarque, Sony Computer Entertainment	**Adventure Game of the Year**: **The Last of Us** — **Naughty Dog**, **Sony Computer Entertainment**‡; Assassin's Creed IV: Black Flag — Ubisoft Montreal; Tearaway — Media Molecule, Sony Computer Entertainment; The Legend of Zelda: A Link Between Worlds — Nintendo EAD; Tomb Raider — Crystal Dynamics, Square Enix Europe
**Fighting Game of the Year**: **Injustice: Gods Among Us** — **NetherRealm Studios**, **Warner Bros. Interactive Entertainment**‡; Divekick — One True Game Studios, Iron Galaxy; Killer Instinct — Double Helix Games, Microsoft Studios	**Role-Playing/Massively Multiplayer Game of the Year**: **Diablo III** (Note: Console version.) — **Blizzard Entertainment**‡; Dota 2 — Valve; Dragon's Dogma: Dark Arisen — Capcom; Ni no Kuni: Wrath of the White Witch — Level-5, Studio Ghibli, Namco Bandai Games; Pokémon X and Y — Game Freak, Nintendo
**Strategy/Simulation Game of the Year**: **XCOM: Enemy Within** — **Firaxis Games**, **2K Games**‡; Civilization V: Brave New World — Firaxis Games, 2K Games; Europa Universalis IV — Paradox Development Studio; Fire Emblem Awakening — Intelligent Systems, Nintendo; StarCraft II: Heart of the Swarm — Blizzard Entertainment	**Casual Game of the Year**: **Plants vs. Zombies 2** — **PopCap Games**, **Electronic Arts**‡; Candy Box! — aniwey; Peggle 2 — PopCap Games, Electronic Arts; Rayman Fiesta Run — Ubisoft Casablanca; Ridiculous Fishing — Vlambeer
**Family Game of the Year**: **Super Mario 3D World** — **Nintendo EAD**‡; Disney Infinity — Avalanche Software, Heavy Iron Studios, Disney Interactive Studios; Lego Marvel Super Heroes — Traveller's Tales, Warner Bros. Interactive Entertainment; Rayman Legends — Ubisoft Montpellier; Skylanders: Swap Force — Vicarious Visions, Activision	**Racing Game of the Year**: **Forza Motorsport 5** — **Turn 10 Studios**, **Microsoft Studios**‡; Gran Turismo 6 — Polyphony Digital, Sony Computer Entertainment; Grid 2 — Codemasters; Need for Speed Rivals — Ghost Games, Electronic Arts; Real Racing 3 — Firemonkeys Studios, Electronic Arts
**Sports Game of the Year**: **FIFA 14** — **EA Canada**‡; Madden NFL 25 — EA Tiburon; MLB 13: The Show — SCE San Diego Studio; NBA 2K14 — Visual Concepts, 2K Games; NHL 14 — EA Canada

=== Special awards ===
==== Hall of Fame ====
- Sam Houser
- Dan Houser
- Leslie Benzies

==== Pioneer ====
- Eugene Jarvis

=== Multiple nominations and awards ===
==== Multiple Nominations ====
Games that received multiple nominations
Nominations	Game
13	The Last of Us
7	Grand Theft Auto V
6	BioShock Infinite
5	Assassin's Creed IV: Black Flag
5	Tearaway
4	Battlefield 4
3	Beyond: Two Souls
3	Papers, Please
3	Puppeteer
3	Rayman Legends
3	The Legend of Zelda: A Link Between Worlds
3	The Stanley Parable
2	Brothers: A Tale of Two Sons
2	Diablo III
2	Fire Emblem Awakening
2	Forza Motorsport 5
2	Plants vs. Zombies 2
2	Pokémon X and Y
2	Rayman Fiesta Run
2	Ridiculous Fishing
2	Ryse: Son of Rome
2	Super Mario 3D World
2	Tomb Raider

Nominations by company
Nominations	Games	Company
29	9	Sony Computer Entertainment
13	8	Electronic Arts
13	1	Naughty Dog
11	4	Ubisoft
10	5	2K Games
10	5	Nintendo
7	1	Rockstar North
6	4	Microsoft Studios
6	1	Irrational Games
5	1	Media Molecule
3	3	Capcom
3	2	Blizzard Entertainment
3	2	PopCap Games
3	1	3909
3	1	Galactic Café
3	1	Quantic Dream
2	2	Firaxis Games
2	2	Warner Bros. Interactive Entertainment
2	1	505 Games
2	1	Crystal Dynamics
2	1	Crytek
2	1	Game Freak
2	1	Intelligent Systems
2	1	Starbreeze Studios
2	1	Square Enix Europe
2	1	Turn 10 Studios
2	1	Vlambeer

==== Multiple awards ====
Games that received multiple awards
Awards	Game
10	The Last of Us
2	BioShock Infinite
2	Plants vs. Zombies 2

Awards by company
Awards	Games	Company
10	1	Naughty Dog
10	1	Sony Computer Entertainment
3	2	Electronic Arts
3	2	2K Games
2	2	Nintendo
2	1	Irrational Games
2	1	PopCap Games
