= David Cage =

French video game designer, writer and musician

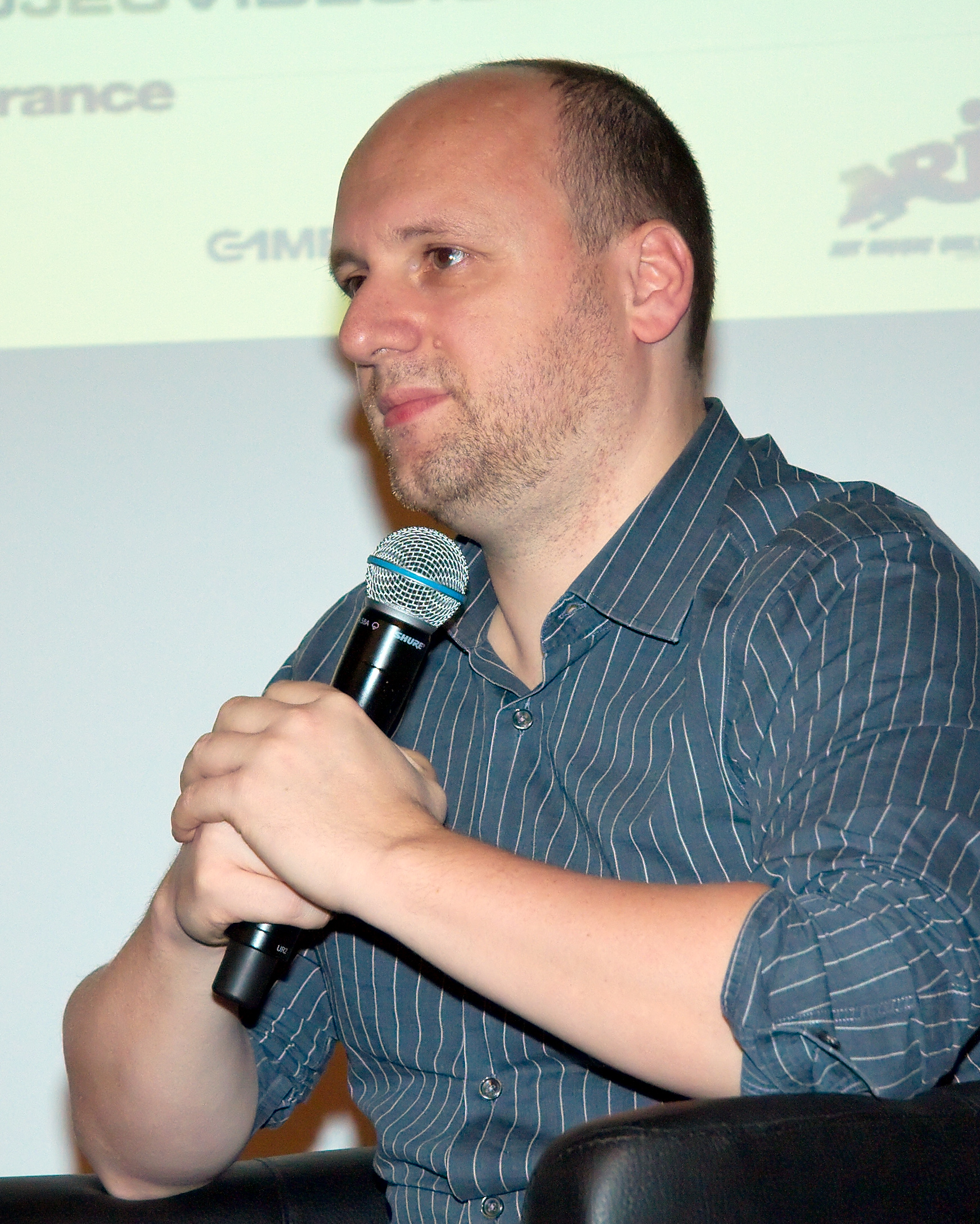
- Cage in 2008
- Born: David De Gruttola; June 9, 1969 (age 57); Mulhouse, France
- Occupation: Video game developer
- Years active: 1993–present
- Known for: Omikron: The Nomad Soul; Fahrenheit; Heavy Rain; Beyond: Two Souls; Detroit: Become Human
- Title: Founder and CEO of Quantic Dream

David De Gruttola (born June 9, 1969), known by his pseudonym David Cage, is a French video game designer, writer and musician. He is the founder of the game development studio Quantic Dream. Cage wrote and directed Heavy Rain, Beyond: Two Souls, and Detroit: Become Human.

== Biography ==
Born in Mulhouse, France, Cage is the head of the video game developer studio Quantic Dream. Cage plays a central role in the company and the development of the games, being founder, co-CEO (with Guillaume de Fondaumière), director, lead game designer, and screenwriter. As a professional musician, he created the company Totem Interactive in 1993, which worked in music and sound productions. He worked as a freelance musician on several television, film and video game projects, involved with original soundtrack work.

My desire to create video games dates back to the arrival of 3D real time [...] I felt like a pioneer filmmaker at the start of the 20th century: grappling with basic technology, but also being aware that there is everything left to invent - in particular a new language that is both narrative and visual.

— David Cage, A word about Fahrenheit..., 2005

His earlier works include working on the music for Cryo Interactive video games Super Dany (1994, credited as David De Gruttola), Cheese Cat-Astrophe Starring Speedy Gonzales (1995, credited as David De Gruttola), Timecop (1995), and Hardline (1996). David Cage left Totem Interactive and founded Quantic Dream in 1997. He has written and directed all five games released by the studio: Omikron: The Nomad Soul (1999), Fahrenheit / Indigo Prophecy (2005), Heavy Rain (2010), Beyond: Two Souls (2013) and Detroit: Become Human (2018).

At the 7th British Academy Games Awards, in which Quantic Dream won three awards for Heavy Rain, Cage stated that "games always explore the same things. They're about being powerful, being the good guys against the bad guys – that's a very tiny part of what can be done. There are so many other stories to tell, so many other emotions to trigger – this is a fantastic new medium, we can do much more than we currently do with it." Game developer Warren Spector described Cage as one of the best storytellers in the business, calling him a genius.

Cage has been critical of "game over" events in story-driven, non-action video games, calling them "a failure of the game design". Cage was the first game developer to receive the Legion of Honour, the highest decoration granted in France. In October 2018, he received a Ping Honor Award for his career.

In 2018, Quantic Dream was involved in a lawsuit with Le Monde and Mediapart, accusing the studio of fostering a toxic workplace, after it was found that one of the employees had been photoshopping pictures of other employees. In April 2021, Quantic Dream won an appeal overturning a July 2018 ruling in favour of a former employee who sued the studio. It was later alleged that Cage said that all the female characters in his games were "whores" and that Quantic Dream "didn't make games for fags". Cage denied these allegations by saying "I have never said or even thought such things. I fully understand people were shocked by seeing those words, and I am deeply sorry for the pain and confusion they have caused to women and the LGBTQIA+ community. The quotes are abhorrent, and they do not reflect my views, nor the views of anyone at Quantic Dream." Representatives of LGBTQ+ employees at the studio defended Cage, stating that deeply hurtful and misleading perceptions "do not reflect [their] everyday lives at work".

== Credits ==
Director and writer

- Omikron: The Nomad Soul (1999)
- Fahrenheit (2005)
- Heavy Rain: The Casting (2006; demo)
- Heavy Rain (2010)
- Heavy Rain: Chronicle One - The Taxidermist (2010; DLC)
- Kara (2012; demo)
- The Dark Sorcerer (2013; demo)
- Beyond: Two Souls (2013)
- Detroit: Become Human (2018)

Composer

- Super Dany (1994)
- Cheese Cat-Astrophe Starring Speedy Gonzales (1995)
- Timecop (1995)
- Out of the Vortex (1995, unreleased)
- Hardline (1996)
- Detroit: Become Human (2018, opening sequence)
