= Under the Waves =

- Developer: Parallel Studio
- Publisher: Quantic Dream
- Engine: Unreal Engine
- Platforms: PlayStation 4; PlayStation 5; Windows; Xbox One; Xbox Series X/S
- Release: WW: August 29, 2023
- Genre: Adventure
- Mode: Single-player

Under the Waves is a 2023 adventure video game developed by Parallel Studio and published by Quantic Dream. Players control a professional diver who attempts to deal with personal trauma and a job that may compromise his principles.

== Gameplay ==
After a traumatic event, deep sea diver Stanley goes to Atlantic Ocean with a robot companion under the auspices of the corporation UniTrench. Players control Stanley as he explores the open world and performs tasks for UniTrench. They can also gather collectibles and craft items. As players progress through each days' tasks, they learn more about Stanley's past and UniTrench's intentions.

== Development ==
Parallel Studio developed Under the Waves in France. Quantic Dream released it for PlayStation 4 and 5, Xbox One and Series X/S, and Windows on August 29, 2023.

== Reception ==
Official accolade trailer

On Metacritic, Under the Waves received positive reviews on Windows and mixed reviews on PlayStation 5. Reviewers said they encountered many bugs and technical issues. Though GamesRadar called it "emotionally resonant, thematically intriguing, and visually striking", they thought the environmentalist narrative was occasionally too blunt. Commenting on the bugs, Video Games Chronicle said it has "plenty of rough edges", but they said it is a memorable game that "handles distressing subject matter in a touching way". The Guardian and Push Square said they continued playing through the technical issues because of the game's immersion and soundtrack.
