= Rayman Fiesta Run =

2013 video game

- Developers: Ubisoft Casablanca
- Publisher: Ubisoft
- Series: Rayman
- Engine: UbiArt Framework
- Platforms: iOS, Android, Windows Mobile
- Release: iOS, Android; November 7, 2013; Windows Mobile; February 5, 2014
- Genre: Platform game

Rayman Fiesta Run is a platform game developed by Ubisoft Casablanca and published by Ubisoft for iOS, Android, and Windows Mobile. It's the sequel to Rayman Jungle Run.

== Reception ==
Reception

Aggregate score
Aggregator	Score
Metacritic	86/100

Review scores
Publication	Score
Destructoid	8/10
Edge	7/10
Electronic Gaming Monthly	8/10
Eurogamer	8/10
Gamezebo	5/5
GameZone	9/10
IGN	8.9/10
MacLife	4.5/5
Pocket Gamer	4.5/5
Shacknews	7/10
TouchArcade	5/5
Digital Spy	5/5

According to the review aggregation website Metacritic, Rayman Fiesta Run received "generally favorable" reviews from critics.

During the 17th Annual D.I.C.E. Awards, the Academy of Interactive Arts & Sciences nominated Rayman Fiesta Run for "Casual Game of the Year" and "Outstanding Achievement in Animation".
