= UbiArt Framework =

Video game engine

- Developer: Ubisoft Montpellier
- Release: 2010
- Written in: C++
- Operating system: Cross-platform
- Type: Game engine
- License: Proprietary

The UbiArt Framework is a 2.5D video game engine developed by Ubisoft Montpellier. Its function is to organize 2D animated vector graphics into a playable video game without extensive coding.

== History ==
In 2010, Ubisoft announced Rayman Origins, first an episodic video game designed by Michel Ancel and developed by a small team of five people, but it was announced that it transformed into a full game. The title uses the UbiArt Framework developed by Ubisoft Montpellier and Ancel. UbiArt is a developer platform that allows artists and animators to easily create content and use it in an interactive environment. The engine is optimized for HD resolutions and is capable of running games at 60 frames per second in resolutions exceeding 1080p.

Ancel has expressed his desire for the framework to be available for anybody to develop games with. However, no public release or licensing option has been made available.

On April 9, 2019, in an interview with IGN, Ubisoft CEO Yves Guillemot explained why the engine was not being used as initially planned, stating that the "tools were difficult to use". The plan was to distribute the engine to other studios with Guillemot saying "at one point we wanted to give them to everybody [in Ubisoft]." However, they decided not to as they wanted to "spend a lot of time with a lot of people to actually help people to use it." But the engine is not abandoned as Guillemot explained "It's still there, and you will see other things using it, but it's not as predominant as it used to be."

== Games developed with UbiArt Framework ==
Year	Title	Platform(s)																
Year	Title	PS3	PSVita	PS4	PS5	Wii	3DS	Wii U	NS	NS2	Win	X360	XONE	XSX/S	IOS	Android	OS X	Stadia
2011	Rayman Origins	Yes	Yes	No	No	Yes	Yes	No	No	No	Yes	Yes	No	Yes	No	No	Yes	No
2012	Rayman Jungle Run	No	No	No	No	No	No	No	No	No	Yes	No	No	No	Yes	Yes	No	No
2013	Rayman Legends Challenge App	No	No	No	No	No	No	Yes	No	No	No	No	No	No	No	No	No	No
2013	Rayman Legends	Yes	Yes	Yes	Yes	No	No	Yes	Yes	No	Yes	Yes	Yes	No	No	No	No	Yes
2013	Rayman Fiesta Run	No	No	No	No	No	No	No	No	No	Yes	No	No	No	Yes	Yes	No	No
2013	Just Dance 2014	Yes	No	Yes	No	Yes	No	Yes	No	No	Yes	Yes	No	No	No	No	No	No
2014	Child of Light	Yes	Yes	Yes	No	No	No	Yes	Yes	Yes	Yes	Yes	No	No	No	No	Yes	No
2014	Valiant Hearts: The Great War	Yes	No	Yes	No	No	No	No	Yes	Yes	Yes	Yes	No	Yes	Yes	No	No	No
2014	Just Dance Wii U	No	No	No	No	No	No	Yes	No	No	No	No	No	No	No	No	No	No
2014	Just Dance 2015	Yes	No	Yes	No	Yes	No	Yes	No	No	Yes	Yes	No	No	No	No	No	No
2015	Gravity Falls: Legend of the Gnome Gemulets	No	No	No	No	No	Yes	No	No	No	No	No	No	No	No	No	No	No
2015	Rayman Adventures	No	No	No	No	No	No	No	No	No	No	No	No	Yes	Yes	No	No	No
2015	Just Dance 2016	Yes	No	Yes	No	Yes	No	Yes	No	No	Yes	Yes	No	No	No	No	No	No
2015	Yo-kai Watch Dance: Just Dance Special Version	No	No	No	No	No	No	Yes	No	No	No	No	No	No	No	No	No	No
2016	Just Dance 2017	Yes	No	Yes	No	Yes	No	Yes	Yes	Yes	Yes	Yes	No	No	No	No	No	No
2017	Just Dance 2018	Yes	No	Yes	No	Yes	No	Yes	Yes	No	Yes	Yes	No	No	No	No	No	No
2018	Just Dance 2019	No	No	Yes	No	Yes	No	Yes	Yes	No	Yes	Yes	No	No	No	No	No	No
2019	Rayman Mini	No	No	No	No	No	No	No	No	No	No	No	No	No	Yes	No	Yes	No
2019	Just Dance 2020	No	No	No	Yes	No	Yes	No	Yes	No	No	No	Yes	No	No	No	No	Yes
2020	Just Dance 2021	No	No	Yes	Yes	No	No	No	Yes	No	No	No	Yes	Yes	No	No	No	Yes
2020	舞力全开 (Just Dance China)	No	No	No	No	No	No	No	Yes	No	No	No	No	No	No	No	No	No
2021	Just Dance 2022	No	No	Yes	Yes	No	No	No	Yes	No	No	No	Yes	Yes	No	No	No	Yes

== Development and Use ==
This framework was originally designed for Rayman Origins and has been implemented in Rayman Legends. Its design was centered on enhancing workflow from artistic design to game development. These tools enabled artists and designers to collaborate directly with environments in the game, and facilitated them to produce fast game prototypes and level designs.

The framework was also employed in other games, such as Child of Light and Valiant Hearts: The Great War, which was developed by Ubisoft. In an April 2019 interview, Ubisoft CEO Yves Guillemot said that it had not been more widely accepted in the company because its tools for developing the games were difficult to use and needed training and support from other development teams.
