= Cheese Cat-Astrophe Starring Speedy Gonzales =

1995 video game

- European Master System box art
- Developer: Cryo Interactive
- Publisher: Sega
- Director: Olivier Lebourg
- Producers: Olivier Lebourg; Janicki Michel
- Designers: Olivier Lebourg; Janicki Michel
- Artists: Philippe Arbogast; Hugues Cazel; Dominique Sablons
- Composer: David Cage
- Platforms: Mega Drive, Master System, Game Gear
- Release: Mega Drive: EU: May 5, 1995; Master System: EU: May 1995; Game Gear: NA: 1995; EU: May 1995
- Genre: Platform
- Mode: Single-player

Cheese Cat-Astrophe Starring Speedy Gonzales is a 1995 platform game developed by Cryo Interactive and published by Sega for the Game Gear, Master System, and Mega Drive. Only the Game Gear version was released in North America.

== Plot ==
Sylvester the Cat, under the alter-ego Dr. Cheesefinger, has "kitnapped" the cheese supply and Speedy Gonzales' girlfriend, Carmel. Speedy Gonzales must outwit the callous cat and rescue both.

== Reception ==
Reception

Review score
Publication	Score
Electronic Gaming Monthly	5.5/10

The four reviewers Electronic Gaming Monthly gave the Game Gear version a 5.5 out of 10, commenting that though the graphics and gameplay are both outstanding, the Game Gear hardware isn't powerful enough to handle them, and the resultant screen blurring whenever Speedy is in motion makes it virtually impossible to avoid taking hits. GamePro made similar comments, but blamed the difficulty in avoiding hits on the fact that Speedy is always positioned at the center of the screen, even when running, thus cutting down the time the player has to react to hazards when they scroll onto the screen. They also gave the game a more positive overall assessment, dubbing it "a fun little game."

== Sources ==
- GamePro staff (July 1995). "ProReview: Cheese Cat-Astrophe Starring Speedy Gonzales". GamePro. No. 82. IDG. ISSN 1042-8658.
- Semrad, Ed; Carpenter, Danyon; Manuel, Al; Williams, Ken, eds. (June 1995). "Review Crew: Cheese Cat-Astrophe: Starring Speedy Gonzales". Electronic Gaming Monthly. No. 71. Ziff Davis. ISSN 1058-918X.
