= Gravity Falls: Legend of the Gnome Gemulets =

2015 platform video game

- Developers: Ubisoft Osaka; Ubisoft San Francisco; Access Games; Success Corp.
- Publisher: Ubisoft
- Director: Marc Fortier
- Producers: Rica Azarcon; Michelle Hull
- Designer: Emiko Sunaga
- Programmers: Kenji Fujimura; Francois Zang-Yen
- Artists: Yasuhiro Matsumoto; Yukiko Iwata; William Bowser; Lamont Gilkey; Vincent Hill
- Composer: Nicholas Bonardi
- Series: Gravity Falls
- Engine: UbiArt Framework
- Platform: Nintendo 3DS
- Release: October 20, 2015
- Genre: Platform
- Mode: Single-player

Gravity Falls: Legend of the Gnome Gemulets is a 2015 platform video game developed by Ubisoft Osaka, published by Ubisoft and produced by Disney Interactive Studios based on the animated Disney series Gravity Falls. The game utilizes the UbiArt Framework engine, and was released for the Nintendo 3DS on October 20, 2015.

== Gameplay ==
Gravity Falls: Legend of the Gnome Gemulets is a side-scrolling platform game. Players assume control of the player characters Dipper and Mabel, and they can freely switch between them at any moment during the game. The two characters have different abilities. Dipper can combat enemies with a close-ranged weapon called Gnome Battle Cuffs and look for clues using a flashlight, while Mabel can utilize a grappling hook to reach high grounds, and combat enemies with ranged attacks by her "Fleece of Bedazzlement-enhanced sweater sleeves". Players can purchase new items from vendors, and return to the regions they have previously explored, similar to a metroidvania. The game also includes humor based on its own cliché story utilized in videogames.

== Development ==
Hirsch created the key art of the game. The game is an adaptation of the TV series instead of a tie-in. Therefore, the game features an original story. The game is powered by Ubisoft's in-house UbiArt Framework engine. Formally announced in July 2015, the game was released worldwide for the Nintendo 3DS on October 20 the same year.

== Reception ==
Reception

Aggregate score
Aggregator	Score
Metacritic	46/100

Review scores
Publication	Score
IGN	4.9/10
Nintendo Life	4/10

Gravity Falls: Legend of the Gnome Gemulets received "generally unfavorable" reviews from critics, according to the review aggregation website Metacritic. Nintendo Life gave the game an unfavorable review. Praise was given for the visuals and the character dialogue, but criticism was leveled at the game's short length and repetitive gameplay.
