= The Novelist =

2013 video game

- Developer: Kent Hudson
- Publisher: Orthogonal Games
- Composer: Kent Hudson
- Platforms: Microsoft Windows, OS X, Linux
- Release: 10 December 2013
- Modes: First-person storytelling, first-person stealth

The Novelist is a 2013 independent video game by Kent Hudson through his company Orthogonal Games. The game was first released on 10 December 2013 through Steam. The Novelist can be played in two formats: in stealth or storytelling mode. The game's story line is told through the viewpoint of a spectral figure that oversees the Kaplan family's daily life while on vacation.

== Synopsis ==
Novelist Dan Kaplan has decided to take his family on vacation in the hopes of not only reconnecting with them, but also defeating his crippling writer's block. His agent wants him to complete his promised novel while Dan's wife Linda wants to work on their failing marriage and develop a career as an artist. During all of this Dan and Linda's sensitive and incredibly lonely son Tommy is desperate to gain his father's attention by way of several crayon drawings.

== Gameplay ==
In storytelling mode the player chooses the direction they want the game's plot to proceed by making several choices that would impact one or more of the Kaplans. Information about the characters' desires and secrets are revealed through a series of diaries, letters, and pictures hidden throughout the Kaplans' vacation home. Players can also learn additional data by accessing the characters' memories at various points in the game. During this mode the player can be seen, but this aspect does not have any impact on the gameplay.

In stealth mode the Kaplans can detect the player, who must avoid being seen by either going behind the characters' backs or by possessing light fixtures. If the player is seen more than twice in one chapter, they lose the ability to influence the Kaplan's choices.

== Reception ==
Reception

Aggregate scores
Aggregator	Score
GameRankings	66.25%
Metacritic	66

Review score
Publication	Score
IGN	6.5

Critical reception for The Novelist has been mixed and the game holds a rating of 66 on Metacritic, based upon 18 reviews. In their review IGN expressed disappointment over the game only having limited endings, as they felt that this "oversimplifies what is otherwise a nuanced portrayal of the balancing act that goes on within families". Wired criticized what they saw as an overuse of personal notes, diaries, and pictures to show what the characters are thinking or feeling, as they found that this felt "ungenuine". Wired also panned The Novelist's stealth mode, and commented that it was "a mostly meaningless obstacle to the story".

In contrast, GameSpot praised the game for the choices made during play, as they viewed that these decisions had "meaningful consequences" and that it "confronts real-life issues in a way that rings true". Polygon also gave a mostly positive review, remarking that it had "sincere, realistic writing and an inspired approach to player choice".

Despite the mixed reception, the Academy of Interactive Arts & Sciences nominated The Novelist for "Outstanding Achievement in Story" during the 17th Annual D.I.C.E. Awards.
