= Puppeteer (video game) =

2013 video game

- Developer: Japan Studio
- Publisher: Sony Computer Entertainment
- Director: Gavin Moore
- Producer: Takashi Mizutani
- Designer: Kazunobu Sato
- Composer: Patrick Doyle
- Platform: PlayStation 3
- Release: JP: September 5, 2013; NA: September 10, 2013; UK/AU: September 11, 2013
- Genre: Platform
- Modes: Single-player, multiplayer

Puppeteer (Note: Japanese: パペッティア, Hepburn: Papettia) is a 2013 platform video game developed by Japan Studio and published by Sony Computer Entertainment for the PlayStation 3.

== Gameplay ==
Puppeteer is a side-scrolling platformer in which the player controls the character 'Kutaro': a boy changed into an animated puppet and immediately decapitated. Throughout the game, Kutaro obtains various heads to replace his own, each enabling access to certain animations, and referring to the adjacent scenery. If Kutaro is damaged by an enemy or obstacle, he loses his head. Should the player not retrieve the head within a few seconds, it will disappear. Kutaro can hold three heads at a time, and when they are all lost, he restarts from the last checkpoint. The player can earn an extra life by collecting 100 "Moonsparkles" in a given section of the game.

Throughout most of the story, Kutaro is armed with a pair of magical scissors, known as 'Calibrus', enabling him to cut through some portions of the scenery, and thus to reach otherwise inaccessible areas. He later acquires the abilities of the Four Champions of the Moon: the Knight's shield to defend against damage and reflect attacks, the Ninja's bombs to attack enemies and break obstacles, the Pirate's hook to grapple and pull enemies and change the scenery, and the Wrestler's mask and strength to body slam enemies and pull and push obstacles. His stated object is to acquire the shards of 'Moonstone' from the game's villains (in the process removing their influence from the scenery) and to free the souls of children like himself, from the malevolent figures containing them, all the while saving a Goddess in distress.

The game is playable by one or two players. If two are playing, the second player controls Kutaro's companion (initially a ghostly cat named 'Ying-Yang'; later the fairylike 'Pikarina'), who can examine the scenery for foreign objects and find interactables, moonsparkles, and new heads for Kutaro. In single-player mode, the two analog sticks on the joypad each control a character.

The game is presented as a puppet show in front of an audience, who can be heard cheering and laughing when impressive actions take place. It is divided into seven "acts", each of which comprise three "curtains". Each curtain has a set number of heads to collect, a set number of souls to rescue, and a hidden area to discover. For 100% completion, the player must revisit old curtains with new heads to complete it.

== Plot ==
The story occurs in a concave world representing Earth's Moon, inhabited by pseudo-folkloric characters: the first half on the dark side of the Moon, and the second half on the Earthward side. Its premise states that the world's ruler, the Moon Goddess, was overthrown by her subordinate, Little Bear, when the latter seized her 'Black Moonstone' and the magic scissor-set 'Calibrus', and declared himself 'Moon Bear King'. Throughout the game, each of his twelve generals (the animals of the Chinese zodiac) has set part of the moon-world in disorder: each holding a portion of the Goddess' 'White Moonstone.’

The player-character 'Kutaro' is one of many children whose souls were spirited away from Earth in their sleep and changed into animated wooden puppets to be enslaved in the King's mobile fortress, Castle Grizzlestein. After having his head pulled off and his soul devoured by the Moon Bear King, Kutaro is found in the dungeons by the Goddess's cat, Ying Yang, who leads him to his current mistress, the Moon Witch Ezma Potts. Potts, who is secretly planning overthrow the Moon Bear King herself, orders Kutaro to sneak into the throne room and capture the magic pair of scissors Calibrus. This weapon allows Kutaro to dispel the King's magic and defeat his puppets to release the souls within, allowing them to escape back to Earth. When the Witch demands the scissors, they adhere to Kutaro, and she allows him to use Calibrus to oppose the twelve generals. During the defeat of the first (General Tiger), Kutaro rescues Pikarina, Princess of the Sun, whom the Moon Bear King had captured. Under Potts' guidance, Kutaro and Pikarina venture to the various realms of the moon, to vanquish each general in turn: the Moonwood Forest guarded by Rat and Snake, the Moonshine Sea patrolled by Pig and Sheep, the Wild Wastes trampled by Bull and Horse, Hallowee-Ville controlled by Dog and Monkey, and the Land of Time conquered by Rabbit and Rooster, ultimately facing off against Dragon.

When the White Moonstone is re-assembled, Potts revealed to be as the Moon Goddess as she transforms back; but is instantly trapped by the Moon Bear King, and must be rescued by Kutaro. Propelled thereto by a cannon, Kutaro and Pikarina disable Castle Grizzlestein and reduce the Moon Bear King to his former shape of Little Bear, who surrenders the Black Moonstone in exchange for Kutaro's friendship, and restores Kutaro's head. All the twelve Generals are resurrected and converted from evil to good; and Kutaro, accompanied by Calibrus and Ying Yang, returns to Earth.

== Development ==
On July 21, 2010, Sony filed a trademark titled Puppeteer. It has been speculated that it would be a game that would make use of the PlayStation Move technology in order to control the main character. Two years later, the trademark was later revealed to be indeed for a game with its official announcement at Gamescom 2012.

In December 2012, Gavin Moore, the director of the video game, posted an entry on the European PlayStation Blog, stating that the video game is "Shaping up nicely, playing great and looking awesome. From January we will be polishing, refining and adding extra little details, to make the whole experience something fantastical and wonderful that PlayStation fans deserve. I will be in London for two weeks doing the Voice recordings in January, popping across to Budapest for the music recordings, then back to Japan with all my wonderful assets to shove them lovingly into the game. This is one of my favourite parts of game creation. Getting the final assets into the game really brings everything together." He also noted that the game plays better in 3D than other games because the camera does not move and his team used a method of 3D that has not resulted in a reduced framerate.

== Reception ==
Reception

Aggregate score
| Aggregator | Score |
|---|---|
| Metacritic | 80/100 |

Review scores
| Publication | Score |
|---|---|
| Destructoid | 7/10 |
| Electronic Gaming Monthly | 4/5 |
| Eurogamer | 6/10 |
| Game Informer | 8.5/10 |
| GameSpot | 9/10 |
| GamesRadar+ | 4.5/5 |
| IGN | 8.5/10 |
| Polygon | 6/10 |
| Push Square | 9/10 |
| VentureBeat | 90/100 |

Puppeteer received "generally favorable" reviews, according to review aggregator Metacritic.

During the 17th Annual D.I.C.E. Awards, the Academy of Interactive Arts & Sciences nominated Puppeteer for outstanding achievement in "Animation", "Art Direction", and "Original Music Composition".
