= Lysfanga: The Time Shift Warrior =

2024 video game

- Developer: Sand Door Studio
- Publisher: Quantic Dream
- Engine: Unity
- Platforms: Windows; Nintendo Switch
- Release: Windows; WW: February 13, 2024; Switch; WW: May 14, 2024
- Genre: Action
- Mode: Single-player

Lysfanga: The Time Shift Warrior is a 2024 action game developed by Sand Door Studio and published by Quantic Dream. Players control a warrior who can fight alongside versions of herself from past runs.

== Gameplay ==
Players control Imë, a warrior blessed by the goddess of time. As players attack Imë's enemies, Imë can fight alongside versions of herself from the previous 10 seconds. So, players can fight enemies near the bottom of the screen, roll back time 10 seconds, and kill other enemies near the top of the screen. By choosing foes tactically and using many clones of Imë, they can clear levels within time limits. Boss fights and some puzzles can require using multiple clones of Imë to win. It is played from an isometric point of view.

== Development ==
Developer Sand Door Studio is based in France. Quantic Dream released Lysfanga: The Time Shift Warrior for Windows on February 13, 2024. The Nintendo Switch version followed on May 14, 2024.

== Reception ==
Lysfanga received mixed reviews on Metacritic. TechRadar praised the combat and tactics, but they said the story and unlockable skills were boring. Digital Trends likewise criticized the story. Although they called the time-traveling gameplay hook ingenious, they felt it was spread too thin.
