= Hardline (video game) =

1996 video game

- Developer(s): Cryo
- Publisher(s): Virgin Interactive Entertainment
- Designer(s): Nic Mathieu; Gregoire Glachant
- Composer(s): David Cage
- Platform(s): MS-DOS, Windows, Macintosh
- Release: NA: November 13, 1996
- Genre(s): Action
- Mode(s): Single-player

Hardline is a live-action FMV-based rail shooter developed by Cryo and Virgin Interactive Entertainment in 1996.

== Plot ==
In the near future (assumed to be Detroit in the year 1998 according to the game's story), a strange cult known as The Sect rises to power. Its members are called "sectoids" and believe in an entity of steel called the Deck. The sectoids are presented as a quasi-terrorist organisation, determined to destroy the present status quo of society moving against schools, hospitals and civilians. Their number is constantly rising and by the start of the game, the government, the police and the military are inadequate to stop them.

The player character is the helicopter pilot named Ted Irvin (David Gregg) who at the start of the game flies to rescue victims who were engaged by sectoids in a warehouse. Once there, he sees he arrived too late and his helicopter is destroyed by an explosion. After a skirmish he falls unconscious and is abducted by the Rebels.

Irvin is brought to their base and talks to the Rebel leader, Morgan (Joseph Rezwin). Seen that he is not of the Sect, they ask him to join them and is offered a shelter to sleep. When he wakes up, he sees the base being overrun by sectoids. Fighting his way out, he meets a Rebel girl, Catherine (Rochelle Redfield) but they are both caught by Sect forces outside.

In the process, he sees that Morgan has joined the sect and they are preparing to sacrifice Irvin to the Deck. However he discovers he has telekinetic powers which help him escape the Sect base. He finds that Catherine has also escaped and together they steal a truck and she drives to the Rebel hideout, where they are reunited with Lars (David Gasman), a man he had already met in the Rebel base. Once more, the building is overrun by sectoids. He escapes and sees the building destroyed. While he falls down exhausted in the rain, he sees Yssel (Patrick Julien), a Sect leader, asking him to join them.

When he recovers, he returns to the base and finds a strange kid with white eye pupils telling him to seek his past for answers. Soon afterwards he is joined by Lars and Catherine who escaped the disaster. Together they go to Chicago where Irvin hopes to find answers concerning his powers and the meaning of some strange visions he has, seen in the course of the game as cutscenes.

== Reception ==
Game Revolution gave the game a 4.5 out of 5, and praised it for good video sequences and excellent action.
