= Quantic Dream =

French video game developer

Quantic Dream SA
- Type: Subsidiary
- Industry: Video games
- Founded: 2 May 1997; 29 years ago
- Founder: David Cage
- Headquarters: Paris, France
- Key people: David Cage (president); Philippe Limantour (managing director); Guillaume de Fondaumière (CEO)
- Number of employees: ▲200+ (2022)
- Parent: NetEase (2022–present)
- Website: quanticdream.com

Quantic Dream SA is a French video game developer and publisher in Paris. Founded in 1997, it has developed five video games: The Nomad Soul (1999), Fahrenheit (2005), Heavy Rain (2010), Beyond: Two Souls (2013), and Detroit: Become Human (2018). The company is known for promoting interactive storytelling, with founder David Cage as the primary creative force. It was acquired by NetEase in August 2022 and continues to operate independently under the acquisition agreement.

== History ==
The original logo for Quantic Dream (1997–2019)

David Cage, originally a composer, started writing the concept and story of The Nomad Soul in 1994. He sent the script to contacts he had acquired during his time making music, who noted that it was not technically feasible. To prove them wrong, Cage hired a team of friends and made an office out of a sound booth, with a financial deadline of six months to come up with a game engine and prototype. In the final week, Cage travelled to London and met with publisher Eidos Interactive. With the project funded and a publisher secured, The Nomad Soul was in full development; musician David Bowie played two characters and created ten original songs. Cage subsequently founded Quantic Dream on 2 May 1997 and incorporated it as a société anonyme on 3 June; the company's name draws influence from the term "quantum physics". The game was released in November 1999, selling more than 600,000 copies. Quantic Dream later provided motion capture for the 2004 film Immortal.

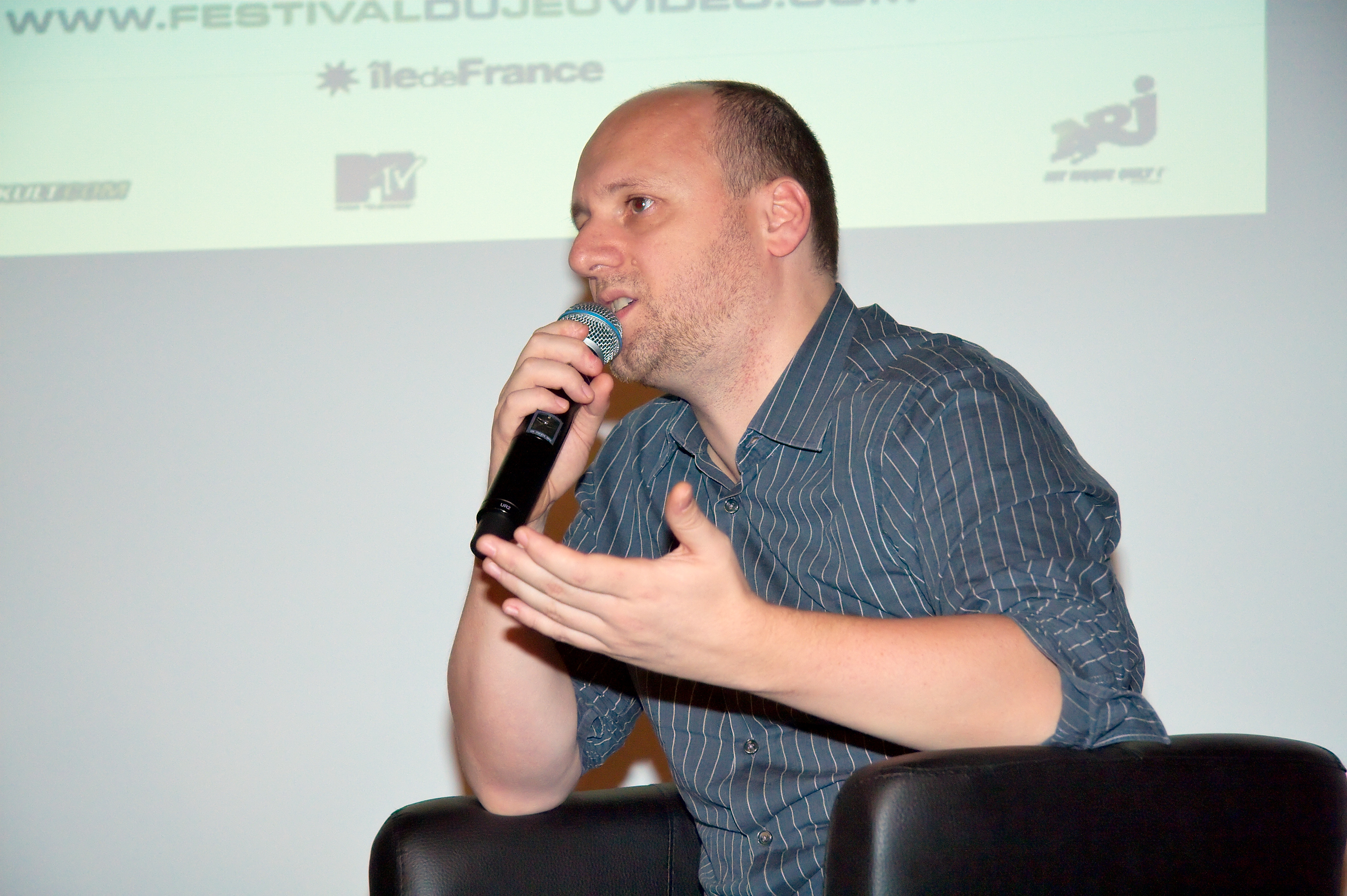
David Cage in 2008

They followed The Nomad Soul with Fahrenheit, published by Atari in September 2005, introducing elements that would endure in their later games—ethical ambiguity, romance, the inability to perish, and interactive storytelling. It received multiple awards and sold over one million copies. The same year, Quantic Dream revealed The Casting, a technology demonstration of what could be accomplished on PlayStation 3. This preceded the partnership with Sony Computer Entertainment to bring Heavy Rain into existence, marking "something more personal" for Cage. Heavy Rain launched in 2010 to critical acclaim, winning three awards at the 7th British Academy Games Awards and selling a total of 5.3 million copies. By late 2011, another deal had been established with Sony. The following year, Quantic Dream showed another PlayStation 3 tech demo, Kara, taking advantage of new investments in motion capture facilities. The second title with Sony was 2013's Beyond: Two Souls, starring actors Elliot Page and Willem Dafoe, which received mixed reviews from critics and managed to sell 2.8 million copies. It was the second video game to be shown at the Tribeca Film Festival in 2013, when The Dark Sorcerer, a tech demo on PlayStation 4, was unveiled.

In 2014, Quantic Dream doubled their investment in Vicon, whose motion capture technology was previously used in Heavy Rain and Beyond: Two Souls. The company's fifth video game and third published by Sony, Detroit: Become Human, was announced the year after. Based on the Kara tech demo, it spent four years in development before releasing in May 2018. Quantic Dream's most successful launch at the time, it sold 3.2 million copies. Around then, Quantic Dream employed 180 staff members, five fewer than were reported in 2016. Chinese Internet conglomerate NetEase secured a minority investment into Quantic Dream in January 2019 for an undisclosed amount. With this, Quantic Dream's chief operating officer Guillaume de Fondaumière stated that they would no longer be limited to PlayStation-exclusive titles. Starting with the PC versions of Heavy Rain, Beyond: Two Souls, and Detroit: Become Human (released throughout 2019), Quantic Dream set out to self-publish its titles. The company opened a new studio in Montreal, Quebec, named Quantic Dream Montreal, in February 2021, to be led by Stephane D'Astous and with Yohan Cazaus as gameplay director.

Star Wars Eclipse was announced at The Game Awards 2021; it is an action-adventure game in the early stages of development by Quantic Dream and licensed under the Lucasfilm Games brand. The game will feature multiple playable characters with branching narratives. It is set in the Star Wars universe and is part of the High Republic multimedia project, which places the events of the game 200 years before The Phantom Menace. According to the reports of some insiders, the game is expected to be released in 2027 at the earliest; industry analysts attributed this long development timeline to an inability to attract staff because of the studio's poor reputation as a place of work. Players used the hashtag "#BlackoutStarWarsEclipse" on Twitter to call on Disney to revoke the Star Wars license from Quantic Dream on account of the studio's history of hostile workplace reports. In August 2024, Adam Williams, who was the lead writer of Star Wars Eclipse and the lead writer of Detroit: Become Human, announced his departure from Quantic Dream; Williams had been with the company for 10 years.

In August 2022, NetEase, a Chinese Internet technology company, announced the acquisition of Quantic Dream after the 2019 minority investment done in the company. After this, the studio would become a subsidiary part of its parent company and would help NetEase objective to have more console game releases. Quantic Dream said that over the years prior that there had been several offers to buy the studio, and they had selected NetEase's proposal as it was favorable to their continued development. According to the acquisition agreement, following the completion of the transaction, Quantic Dream would continue to operate independently of its parent company, NetEase.

In June 2023, Quantic Dream revealed the brand name, "Spotlight by Quantic Dream", under which it will continue publishing third-party games made outside the studio. The new label was officially unveiled during Summer Games Fest, where the company showed off trailers for its next two releases, Under the Waves and Lysfanga: The Time Shift Warrior.

In early 2026, the studio released a MOBA, Spellcasters Chronicles, a title they had been developing since around 2018 following Detroit: Become Human, into early access. The title was seen as a risk for the studio, different from anything else they had done before and entering into the crowded multiplayer market, but felt they could take it with the "safe bet" of Star Wars Eclipse in the works. The game failed to garner a large playbase after three months, and Quantic Dream opted to cut its losses, announcing the game would be shuttered in June 2026, and would need to lay off about 100 jobs to "refocus [their] efforts" on other games. The trade union Le Syndicat des Travailleureuses du Jeu Vidéo (STJV) used the situation at Quantic Dream to start a national strike to highlight the need for more protections for employees of French video game developers that received funding from the French government. Quantic Dream workers that took part in the strike warned that if the layoffs did occur, Star Wars Eclipse would likely remain unfinished, as the studio would be significantly understaffed, and considered their striking as a means to save Star Wars Eclipse. The workers also claimed that as soon as the studio announced plans for layoffs, it was forced into crunch time to try to complete the game.

=== Philosophy ===
Quantic Dream's video games are written and directed by David Cage and branded accordingly, with the purpose of making new intellectual properties. Cage has declared that his mission is to evoke emotion through interactive storytelling, highlighting empathy, sadness, and guilt in opposition to frustration, competition, and anger. As such, he described purchasing Heavy Rain as a "political act" that others like it could be made. The developer strives to appeal to gamers and non-gamers alike, considering video games to be the same as any artform. It is customary at Quantic Dream to develop an engine for each new game, hardware, or platform; Cage believes that, while an engine's methodology can be ported, its code cannot. Tech demos have likewise become tradition. In France, Quantic Dream is afforded a 20% tax break on production costs, without which Cage has said he would move the company to Canada to keep up with the competition.

== List of games ==
Year	Title	Platform(s)	Publisher(s)
Developed by Quantic Dream
1999	The Nomad Soul (Note: The Nomad Soul was retitled Omikron: The Nomad Soul in North America, which David Cage saw as the publisher's lack of confidence in its marketability and said contributed to its poor sales.)	Microsoft Windows, Dreamcast	Eidos Interactive
2005	Fahrenheit (Note: Fahrenheit was retitled Indigo Prophecy for the North American release; Cage accused the publisher of not seeing its market potential.)	PlayStation 2, Xbox, Microsoft Windows, macOS, Linux, iOS, Android, PlayStation 4	Atari, Aspyr, Quantic Dream
2010	Heavy Rain	PlayStation 3, PlayStation 4, Microsoft Windows	Sony Interactive Entertainment, Quantic Dream
2013	Beyond: Two Souls	PlayStation 3, PlayStation 4, Microsoft Windows	Sony Interactive Entertainment, Quantic Dream
2018	Detroit: Become Human	PlayStation 4, Microsoft Windows	Sony Interactive Entertainment, Quantic Dream
TBA	Star Wars Eclipse	TBA	Quantic Dream
Notes
Under the label "Spotlight by Quantic Dream"
2021	Sea of Solitude: The Director's Cut	Nintendo Switch	Jo-Mei Games
2023	Under the Waves	PlayStation 4, PlayStation 5, Xbox One, Xbox Series X/S, Microsoft Windows	Parallel Studio
2024	Lysfanga: The Time Shift Warrior	Nintendo Switch, Microsoft Windows	Sand Door Studio
2024	Dustborn	macOS, PlayStation 4, PlayStation 5, Xbox One, Xbox Series X/S, Microsoft Windows	Red Thread Games

=== Cancelled games ===
Title	Publisher(s)	Note(s)
Spellcasters Chronicles	Quantic Dream	Canceled after Early Access release

== Controversies ==
=== 2018 workplace reports ===
In January 2018, three French news outlets—Le Monde, Mediapart, and Canard PC—published the results of a joint investigation into the company's business practices. Le Monde called Quantic Dream "a toxic corporate culture, management with inappropriate words and attitudes, under-considered employees, overwhelming workloads and questionable contractual practices". First among the issues raised by the newspapers, Cage and de Fondaumière were said to have participated in or encouraged a sexist and racist culture, with controversial images exchanged by email and posted around the office including photos of studio collaborators and employees digitally edited to appear as Nazis or porn stars. Canard PC stated that the entire IT department had quit in March 2017 because of these "bad jokes". Second, studio management was accused of employing an arduous "crunch time" schedule in which 15–35 additional hours of work per week were expected for a year before a game's launch. Third, the human resources department was accused of colluding to terminate fixed-term contract staff before their deal expired, violating French labour laws, and arranging settlements to remove employees who did not fit in with the studio culture. In particular, the reports outlined how de Fondaumière conspired with the company to use French labor laws to contest his dismissal in 2016 and obtain a €60,000 compensation fee that was not subject to social security collection via URSSAF.

Cage and de Fondaumière denied the reports. In February 2018, the studio called the charges a smear campaign in an official statement. They levied lawsuits against Le Monde and Mediapart in April 2018, while Canard PC received two "threatening letters". Several employees who had left or been terminated filed suit against Quantic Dream. That July, Quantic Dream lost a court case against one of the employees who left due to the hostile workplace culture. The employee sought to reclassify their resignation as a wrongful termination under the French employment law of prise d'acte. This case was later overturned; the Court of Appeal of Paris explained that none of the specific photos depicting this particular employee were degrading and therefore did not qualify for wrongful termination under prise d'acte. In a separate case brought by another former employee, the Parisian employment tribunal found for the employee, stating that the studio had allowed the "homophobic, misogynistic, racist, or even deeply vulgar" dissemination of the photos to continue in the workplace, and further ordered Quantic Dream to pay €5,000 in addition to a €2,000 fee in December 2019 after finding that the company "[remained] passive in the face of this practice more than questionable, which can not be justified by the 'humorous' spirit of which the company avails itself, the employer has committed a breach of the obligation of security". Other cases remain pending.

The trials against news outlets Le Monde and Mediapart were held in May 2021. The verdict was given on 9 September 2021. In a personal libel suit brought by Cage and de Fondaumière, accusations against Le Monde were recognised by the court, as Le Monde refused to disclose the identity of the anonymous sources it had used and thus had failed to meet the burden of proof. The court ruled in favor of Mediapart in the personal suit, dismissing charges related to three of seven passages in their report about Quantic Dream, while stating that the other four were made in "good faith" as they had "a sufficient factual basis" as to not qualify for libel. Separate cases filed against Le Monde and Mediapart on behalf of Quantic Dream as a company also found in favor of the defendants, clearing them of the libel charges.
