= Guillaume de Fondaumière =

Video game producer (born 1971)

- Born: 28 June 1971 (age 55); Marseille, France
- Education: European Business School Paris
- Occupation: Chief executive officer
- Known for: Co-CEO of Quantic Dream

Guillaume de Fondaumière (born 28 June 1971, Marseille, France) is co-CEO of Quantic Dream.

== Early life ==
He created his first company at the age of 16, C. de C. Promotion, specializing in the organization of clubbings, fashion shows and live concerts. After obtaining the French Baccalaureate at the Lycée Français de Vienne in Austria in 1990 (he is fluent in French, German and English), he studied Management and Marketing at the European Business School Paris. He graduated in 1994.

== Arxel Tribe ==
In 1993, he and an old schoolmate, Stephen Carriere, met architects Matjaz Pozlep and Diego Zanco while on a traineeship. They co-founded Arxel Tribe, a 3D graphics studio.

In 1996, Arxel Tribe joined the Brazilian author Paulo Coelho and star designer Mœbius to create the video game Pilgrim. The following year, Pilgrim was published by Infogrames Entertainment (now Atari). In 1998, Arxel Tribe developed a new game, Ring, adapted from Richard Wagner's opera Der Ring des Nibelungen. The game won a number of international awards and sold in excess of 500,000 copies.

In 2000, de Fondaumière became the President and Chief Executive of Arxel Tribe Group. In 2001, the company was sold for over €15 million to CTO S.P.A., Italy's leading video game distributor. De Fondaumière continued to supervise all publishing activities of the group, in addition to controlling all matters concerning the acquisition of book and film licenses for video game adaptations. He resigned in March 2003.

== Quantic Dream ==
In December 2003, de Fondaumière joined the video game development company Quantic Dream as Chief Operating Officer. He currently is co-CEO with David Cage, the founder and creative figure of Quantic Dream, CFO and executive producer (Fahrenheit, Heavy Rain, Beyond: Two Souls, Detroit: Become Human).

== Trade bodies ==
He was elected President of the French video game trade body Association des Producteurs d'Oeuvres Multimédia (APOM) (today Syndicat National du Jeu Vidéo or SNJV) in April 2005 and was re-elected in June 2006 for two years. He was re-elected in 2014 for another two year mandate. He has been appointed Chairman of the European Games Developer Federation. He announced in May 2015 that he would be stepping down from the Chairmanship of the EGDF in October 2015. He is also a member of the board of the Swiss Arts Council Pro-Helvetia and of PEGI (Pan European Game Information system)

He was knighted in France's National Order of Merit for his contribution to his country's digital economy.
