= Indigo Prophecy =

2005 action-adventure game

- Developer: Quantic Dream (Note: Remastered version developed by Aspyr)
- Publisher: Atari (Note: Remastered versions published by Aspyr and Quantic Dream)
- Directors: David Cage; Steve Kniebihly; Jérôme Britneff-Bondy
- Producer: Guillaume de Fondaumière
- Designers: Wilfried-Alexandre Brunet; Guillaume Bonamy
- Programmer: Christophe Vivet
- Artist: Philippe Aballea
- Writers: David Cage; Elisabeth Fournier
- Composers: Angelo Badalamenti; Normand Corbeil; Farid Russlan
- Platforms: PlayStation 2; Windows; Xbox; Android; iOS; Linux; macOS
- Release: PlayStation 2, Windows, Xbox; PAL: 16 September 2005; NA: 20 September 2005; WW: 5 December 2007; Android, iOS, Linux, macOS; WW: 29 January 2015
- Genre: Action-adventure
- Mode: Single-player

Indigo Prophecy (known as Fahrenheit outside North America) is an action-adventure game developed by Quantic Dream and published by Atari for Windows, PlayStation 2, and Xbox in September 2005. The plot follows Lucas Kane, a man who commits murder while supernaturally possessed, and two police detectives investigating the case. Gameplay involves the player making decisions to alter the narrative.

Writer and director David Cage completed the 2,000-page script in one year. Quantic Dream, then employing almost eighty people, took two years to develop the game. Indigo Prophecy was chiefly praised for the story, characters, voice acting, and music, but criticised for the ending and graphics. It sold over one million copies. A remastered version released for Windows, Android, iOS, Linux, and macOS in 2015.

== Gameplay ==
Lucas' mental state deteriorating

Indigo Prophecy is an action-adventure game (Note: Quantic Dream self-designated it as interactive drama.) played from third- and first-person perspectives. The main controllable characters are Lucas Kane, a man supernaturally possessed into committing murder, and New York City Police detectives Carla Valenti and Tyler Miles, who pursue him; Lucas' brother Markus is occasionally playable. Story details can change and three endings are unlockable depending on what the player does, including managing the protagonists' state of mind and pressing on-screen prompts. The left analogue stick is for movement, the right one will trigger actions like dialogue choices or grabbing objects, and both are needed to summon Lucas' paranormal abilities. To mimic exertion, the trigger buttons must be pressed rapidly. Chapters may be replayed once the player has beaten the game.

== Plot ==
Certain elements of Indigo Prophecy's plot, such as the endings, can change based on the player's choices. This synopsis focuses on the non-determinant plot elements of the game.

One night in New York City in 2009, a possessed Lucas Kane stabs a man to death in the restroom of a diner and then flees the scene. The case is assigned to Detective Carla Valenti and her partner, Tyler Miles. Lucas sees a spiritual medium named Agatha, who places him in a trance to try to recall the events from before. Upon discovering that he had been approached by a strange man, who seemed to be controlling him during the slaying, Lucas leaves. He returns the following night, only to find Agatha dead. Meanwhile, the police have identified Lucas as the prime suspect, and lay a trap to capture him. He demonstrates superhuman strength, defeating them all and escaping onto a moving train.

Directed by what appears to be Agatha's spirit, Lucas learns that what occurred in the restaurant was a Mayan sacrifice. He sets up a meeting with a specialist on the Maya civilization, according to whom, the ritual was meant to unlock a passage into the "Other World". The executioner was traditionally supposed to commit suicide afterwards. Eventually, Lucas' ex-girlfriend is kidnapped by the man from the diner, a Mayan Oracle, in order to draw him out. In his efforts to rescue her, both perish, but he is brought back to life by a group of artificial intelligence (AI) that seeks the Indigo Child, a young girl who carries a secret that grants unlimited power to whoever hears it.

Carla's investigation leads her to interview a convict whose modus operandi mirrored Lucas'. He tells her about the Orange Clan, of which the Oracle is a member, and their search for eternal life. Lucas makes contact with Carla and convinces her to trust him. He explains that the Oracle will do anything in pursuit of the Indigo Child. Lucas discovers where she is, bringing her to a military base where Lucas grew up and was exposed to Chroma, a force which gave him the ability to resist the Oracle's attempts to drive him to suicide and will enable the Indigo Child to deliver her message. The Oracle and AI follow them, and a final battle takes place. Three months later, Lucas is living with Carla, who is now pregnant.

== Development and release ==
Indigo Prophecy was developed by Quantic Dream. Founder David Cage served as writer and director. Due to lack of support from initial publisher Vivendi Games, the role was turned over to Atari, adding to the budget. The game had originally been planned as an episodic title with twelve installments and a team of writers, but Cage later abandoned the format. His intention was to make something that would satisfy ex- and non-gamers, expressing frustration with the industry's repetitive nature and focus on younger demographics. He saw story as the primary import and resolved that the narrative would be formed based on player choice. To maintain control of the pacing and quality in an ever-changing plot, he thought of it as a rubber band; "the player can stretch or deform the rubber band through his actions, but whatever he does the backbone of my story is always there". The American setting and classic archetypes were deliberately chosen for accessibility. The design document took him a year to finish, was composed of 2,000 pages, and required comprehensive directions to avoid any sudden alterations to the production.

Indigo Prophecy entailed nearly eighty in-house employees, in addition to sixty stuntmen and actors who performed over twelve hours' worth of facial and motion capture animation, which they concluded in three months, and three hours of voice work. A blue colour filter, high dynamic range effects, and film grain were used to achieve the desired atmosphere. Early gameplay tests resulted in a thirty-per cent faster navigation, while some cut-scenes were removed or sped up. Cage decided to implement a gauge to more clearly represent a character's mental health. This system as well as the "game over" sequences were completed in two weeks. He then came up with a context-sensitive user interface where moving the analogue sticks could enable an unrestricted number of gestures. Cage appeared in the tutorial at the request of a Vivendi producer. The TV series 24 inspired the use of split screen in the game, both for its visual and interactive potential. The films Snake Eyes (1998), Seven (1995), Jacob's Ladder (1990), and Angel Heart (1987) influenced the story and characters; Fight Club (1999) and Dune (1984) made an impact on the voice-over. Composer Angelo Badalamenti recorded the score with a Canadian orchestra, supervised by Normand Corbeil. Badalamenti was told by the director to think of the soundtrack as though it were made for a movie. Corbeil worked on the project for a month and a half. Indigo Prophecy was released to manufacturing in early September 2005, after two years of development.

Atari published Indigo Prophecy for Windows, PlayStation 2, and Xbox in Europe and Australia, as well as North America on 16 and 20 September 2005, respectively. It was made downloadable on Xbox 360 in 2007 and on PlayStation 4 in 2016. The title Fahrenheit was changed to Indigo Prophecy in North America to avoid confusion with the 2004 film Fahrenheit 9/11, a point of contention between Cage and Atari. Sex scenes were omitted from this version, but included in Fahrenheit: Indigo Prophecy Remastered, which launched for Windows, Android, iOS, Linux, and macOS in 2015.

== Reception ==
Reception

Aggregate scores
| Aggregator | Score |
|---|---|
| GameRankings | 85% (PC); 86% (XBOX); 84% (PS2) |
| Metacritic | 85/100 (PC); 84/100 (XBOX); 83/100 (PS2) |

Review scores
| Publication | Score |
|---|---|
| 1Up.com | B+ |
| GameSpot | 8.4/10 |
| GameSpy | 3.5/5 |
| GameZone | 9/10 |
| IGN | 8.3/10 |

According to Metacritic, Indigo Prophecy received generally favourable reviews by critics. Executive producer Guillaume de Fondaumière claimed it was the highest-rated in its genre since Grim Fandango (1998) and considered the release a commercial success, with over one million copies sold. It was named the best adventure game of 2005 by Computer Games Magazine, GameSpy, PC Gamer, and IGN; Adventure Gamers ranked it fifty-seventh of all time. Game Informer listed Indigo Prophecy last among ten video game openings.

Garnett Lee of 1Up.com praised the "disturbing" and graceful nature of the story as well as its combination with the gameplay, saying Indigo Prophecy had set a new standard for future aims of doing so. GameSpot's Alex Navarro highlighted the layers of context and "heartfelt meaning" to its use of cinematic gameplay. He enjoyed the narrative, dubbing it "deep, captivating", and, echoing Lee, "disturbing". The character development, art style, voice acting, and music also saw approval from Navarro. Raymond M. Padilla at GameSpy declared that "it's so good that it just might save a dying genre", regarding the plot and main characters to be well-written and the voice cast as one of the best of the year. The controls were admired for their accessibility, while the score was complimented for its "moody and captivating" qualities. Writing for GameZone, Ronnie Hobbs liked that the controls helped with narrative immersion, and that this created an emotional connection to the characters. Hobbs' verdict read: "Despite its flaws, Indigo Prophecy is the definitive interactive story, and not only does it perfect the genre, it redefines it". Charles Onyett, reviewing the game for IGN, thought it succeeded in its effort to provide a movie-like experience. The feature of multiple playable characters was believed to have worked well, the action choreography and voice acting impressed him, and the soundtrack was described as gripping.

Conversely, Lee expressed dislike to the "rather weakly implemented Metal Gear Solid-like stealth sections" and Indigo Prophecy's final third, which he perceived to be rushed. Navarro agreed with Lee on the ending and sneak sequences, criticising the former for its incoherent aspects and latter because it lacked engagement, matching the reason he disapproved of the puzzles. Additionally, Navarro complained that the graphics were unsightly. Padilla disparaged the PC version for being worse than its console counterparts, calling the keyboard and mouse setup "not fun". He noted that button commands would sometimes distract from on-screen events. As with Navarro, Padilla termed the graphics an "undeniable flaw". Hobbs found it difficult to endure the "awkward" camera angles and "questionable" character movements. Onyett noticed the same control problem, opining that this could become "difficult and tedious". He was displeased with the effects of playing on a computer and, like Lee and Navarro, took issue with the last portions of the game. Onyett chastised the graphics' "fuzzy" edges and "bland" textures along with the "stilted and awkward" animations.

=== Awards ===
| Year | Award | Category | Result | Ref. |
|---|---|---|---|---|
| 2005 | Develop Industry Excellence Awards | Best New PC IP | Won | |
| 2005 | Spike Video Game Awards | Best Original Score | Nominated | |
| 2006 | Saturn Awards | Best Video Game Release: Horror | Nominated | |
| 2006 | G.A.N.G. Awards | Best Original Vocal Song – Pop ("Santa Monica") | Nominated | |
| 2006 | Game Developers Choice Awards | Writing | Nominated | |
| 2006 | NAVGTR Awards | Direction, Cinema | Nominated | |
| 2006 | NAVGTR Awards | Game, Original Adventure | Won | |
| 2006 | NAVGTR Awards | Original/Adapted Song ("Santa Monica") | Nominated | |
| 2006 | NAVGTR Awards | Song Collection | Nominated | |
| 2006 | NAVGTR Awards | Sound Editing in a Game Cinema | Nominated | |
| 2006 | NAVGTR Awards | Lead Performance in a Drama (Sharon Mann) | Nominated | |
| 2006 | NAVGTR Awards | Writing in a Drama | Won | |
