= Just Dance Now =

2014 video game

- Developers: Massive Entertainment; Ubisoft Milan; Ubisoft Paris
- Publisher: Ubisoft
- Series: Just Dance
- Platforms: iOS, Android, tvOS, Tizen
- Release: September 25, 2014
- Genres: Music, Rhythm
- Modes: Single-player, multiplayer

Reception

Review scores
Publication	Score
148Apps	4.5/5
Multiplayer.it	8.5/10

Just Dance Now is a video game in the Just Dance series developed and published by Ubisoft. It was released on September 25, 2014, in both the App Store and Google Play. The trailer for the game was revealed at E3 2014 on June 9, 2014, as a spin-off title. Without the purchase of a VIP pass, a free version of the game with limited plays is available.

== Gameplay ==
Just Dance Now is intended for people who may not have access to a console to play the original games. As with the original games, players must mimic the on-screen dancer's choreography to a chosen song. The app version uses an Internet connection to the Just Dance Now website through either a television, a computer, a laptop, a tablet, a Chromecast or an Apple TV. The phone acts as a motion controller, much like the Wii Remote. Multiple players may connect simultaneously, and there is no limit to the number of players allowed.

Since the June 2017 update, the game now allows players to play any song or routine of their choosing for in-game currency instead of the previous model of providing a playlist offering limited free songs. The app offers a library of songs requiring a time-limited VIP pass which can be purchased through the app, or with coins which are automatically earned overtime or purchased through the app. As of April 2024, the game contains 614 songs, excluding alternate routines and including "You're On My Mind" (Note: Quadro Mashup) from Just Dance 2015.

== Track listing ==
=== Main series ===
The following list contains the songs that had previously appeared in the main Just Dance series up until Just Dance 2023 Edition:

Note: Since April 9, 2024, most songs featured here have been removed due to licensing constraints. Just Dance Unlimited also faced this same fate on August 1.

Song	Artist	Year	Original game
"24K Magic"	Bruno Mars	2016	Just Dance 2018
"99 Luftballons"*	Nena (covered by Rutschen Planeten)	1983	Just Dance 2014
"A La Folie"	Julien Granel & Lena Situations	2021	Just Dance 2022
"A Little Party Never Killed Nobody (All We Got)"	Fergie feat. Q-Tip and GoonRock	2013	Just Dance 2019
"Acceptable in the 80s"	Calvin Harris	2007	Just Dance
"Adeyyo"	Ece Seçkin	2016	Just Dance 2019
"Adore You"	Harry Styles	2019	Just Dance 2021
"Ain't My Fault"	Zara Larsson	2016	Just Dance Unlimited
"Airplanes"	B.o.B feat. Hayley Williams	2010	Just Dance 3 (Target/Zellers edition (NTSC)/Xbox 360 (PAL))
"Alexandrie Alexandra"*	Claude François (covered by Jérôme Francis)	1978	Just Dance 2021
"All About That Bass"	Meghan Trainor	2014	Just Dance 2016
"All About Us"	Jordan Fisher	2016	Just Dance 2017
"All the Good Girls Go to Hell"	Billie Eilish	2019	Just Dance 2021
"All The Stars"	Kendrick Lamar feat. SZA	2018	Just Dance 2021
"All You Gotta Do"	The Just Dance Band	2017	Just Dance 2018
"Always Look on the Bright Side of Life"*	Monty Python (covered by The Frankie Bostello Orchestra)	1979	Just Dance 2020 (8th-gen & Stadia)
"Am I Wrong"	Nico & Vinz	2014	Just Dance Unlimited
"American Girl"	Bonnie McKee	2013	Just Dance 2014 DLC
"Animals"	Martin Garrix	2013	Just Dance 2016
"Another One Bites the Dust"	Queen	1980	Just Dance 2018
"Apache (Jump on It)"	Sugarhill Gang	1981	Just Dance 3
"Applause"	Lady Gaga	2013	Just Dance 2014
"Aquarius/Let the Sunshine In"*	The 5th Dimension (covered by The Sunlight Shakers)	1969	Just Dance 2014
"Aserejé (The Ketchup Song)"	Las Ketchup	2002	Just Dance 4
"Automaton"	Jamiroquai	2017	Just Dance 2018
"Baby Girl"	Reggaeton	2009	Just Dance 2
"Baby One More Time"* (R)	Britney Spears (covered by The Girly Team)	1998	Just Dance 3
"Baby Shark"	Pinkfong	2016	Just Dance 2020
"Bad Boy"	Riton and Kah-Lo	2018	Just Dance 2020
"Bad Guy"	Billie Eilish	2019	Just Dance 2020
"Bad Habits"	Ed Sheeran	2021	Just Dance Unlimited
"Bad Liar"	Selena Gomez	2017	Just Dance 2018
"Bad Romance"	Lady Gaga	2009	Just Dance 2015
"Baianá"	Bakermat	2019	Just Dance 2022
"Bailando"	Paradisio	1996	Just Dance 2021
"Bailar"	Deorro feat. Elvis Crespo	2016	Just Dance 2017
"Balkan Blast Remix"	Angry Birds	2015	Just Dance 2016
"Bang"	Anitta	2015	Just Dance 2017
"Bang Bang"	Jessie J, Ariana Grande and Nicki Minaj	2014	Just Dance 2015
"Bang Bang Bang"	BigBang	2015	Just Dance 2019
"Bangarang"	Skrillex feat. Sirah	2012	Just Dance 2020
"Barbie Girl"* (R)	Aqua (covered by Countdown Dee's Hit Explosion)	1997	Just Dance 2 DLC
"Bassa Sababa"	Netta	2019	Just Dance 2020
"Beauty and a Beat"	Justin Bieber feat. Nicki Minaj	2012	Just Dance 4
"Beep Beep I'm a Sheep"	LilDeuceDeuce feat. BlackGryph0n & TomSka	2017	Just Dance 2018
"Believer"	Imagine Dragons	2017	Just Dance 2022
"Best Song Ever"	One Direction	2013	Just Dance 2015
"Better When I'm Dancin'"	Meghan Trainor	2015	Just Dance Unlimited
"Beware of the Boys (Mundian To Bach Ke)"	Panjabi MC	1999	Just Dance 4
"Big Girl (You Are Beautiful)" (R)	Mika	2007	Just Dance 2
"Birthday"	Katy Perry	2014	Just Dance 2015
"Black Mamba"	Aespa	2020	Just Dance 2022
"Black Widow"	Iggy Azalea feat. Rita Ora	2014	Just Dance 2015
"Blame"	Calvin Harris feat. John Newman	2014	Just Dance 2016
"Blinding Lights"	The Weeknd	2019	Just Dance 2021
"Blow Your Mind (Mwah)"	Dua Lipa	2016	Just Dance 2018
"Blue (Da Ba Dee)"*	Eiffel 65 (covered by Hit the Electro Beat)	1998	Just Dance 2018
"Blurred Lines"	Robin Thicke feat. Pharrell Williams	2013	Just Dance 2014
"Bonbon"	Era Istrefi	2015	Just Dance 2017
"Boogie Wonderland"*	Earth, Wind & Fire feat. The Emotions (covered by Groove Century)	1979	Just Dance 3
"Boom"*	MC Magico and Alex Wilson (covered by Reggaeton Storm)	2005	Just Dance 3
"Boom Boom"	Iggy Azalea feat. Zedd	2017	Just Dance 2018
"Boombayah"	Blackpink	2016	Just Dance 2022
"Boom Clap"	Charli XCX	2014	Just Dance 2015 DLC
"Born This Way"	Lady Gaga	2011	Just Dance 2016
"Boss Witch"*	Doja Cat (covered by Skarlett Klaw)	2020	Just Dance 2022
"Boy, You Can Keep It"	Alex Newell	2020	Just Dance 2021
"Boys"	Lizzo	2018	Just Dance Unlimited
"Boys (Summertime Love)"*	Sabrina (covered by The Lemon Cubes)	1984	Just Dance 2016
"Break Free"	Ariana Grande feat. Zedd	2014	Just Dance 2015 DLC
"Bubble Pop!"	HyunA	2011	Just Dance 2018
"Build a B****"	Bella Poarch	2021	Just Dance 2022
"Built for This"	Becky G	2013	Just Dance 2015
"Bum Bum Tam Tam"	MC Fioti, Future, J Balvin, Stefflon Don and Juan Magan	2017	Just Dance 2019
"Burn"	Ellie Goulding	2013	Just Dance 2015
"Buscando"	GTA & Jenn Morel	2018	Just Dance 2021
"Buttons"	The Pussycat Dolls	2006	Just Dance 2022
"C'mon"	Kesha	2012	Just Dance 2014
"Cake by the Ocean"	DNCE	2015	Just Dance 2017
"California Gurls" (R)	Katy Perry feat. Snoop Dogg	2010	Just Dance 3
"Calypso"	Luis Fonsi feat. Stefflon Don	2018	Just Dance 2019
"Can't Feel My Face"	The Weeknd	2015	Just Dance 2017
"Can't Get Enough"	Becky G feat. Pitbull	2013	Just Dance 2014 DLC
"Can't Hold Us"	Macklemore & Ryan Lewis	2011	Just Dance 2014
"Can't Stop the Feeling!"	Justin Timberlake	2016	Just Dance 2023 Edition
"Can't Take My Eyes Off You"	Boys Town Gang	1982	Just Dance 4
"Carmen (Ouverture)"*	Georges Bizet (covered by Just Dance Orchestra)	1875	Just Dance 2018
"Carnaval Boom"	Latino Sunset	2016	Just Dance 2017
"Cercavo amore"	Emma	2012	Just Dance 4 (PAL)
"Chacarron"	El Chombo	2005	Just Dance 2022
"Chandelier"	Sia	2014	Just Dance 2022
"Chantaje"	Shakira feat. Maluma	2016	Just Dance 2018
"Cheap Thrills"	Sia feat. Sean Paul	2016	Just Dance 2017
"Cheerleader"	Omi	2014	Just Dance Unlimited
"Chicken Payback" (R)	The Bees (credited as A Band Of Bees)	2004	Just Dance 2 DLC
"China"	Anuel AA, Daddy Yankee, Karol G, Ozuna and J Balvin	2019	Just Dance 2022
"Chiwawa"	Wanko Ni Mero Mero	2015	Just Dance 2016
"Circus"	Britney Spears	2008	Just Dance 2016
"Cola Song"	Inna feat. J Balvin	2014	Just Dance 2017
"Come Back Home"	2NE1	2014	Just Dance Unlimited
"Come On Eileen"	Dexys Midnight Runners	1982	Just Dance 2 DLC
"Con altura"	Rosalía and J Balvin feat. El Guincho	2019	Just Dance 2020
"Con Calma"	Daddy Yankee feat. Snow	2019	Just Dance 2020
"Cool for the Summer"	Demi Lovato	2015	Just Dance 2016
"Copacabana"*	Barry Manilow (covered by Frankie Bostello)	1978	Just Dance 2016
"Cosmic Girl"	Jamiroquai	1996	Just Dance 2
"Cotton Eye Joe" (R)	Rednex	1997	Just Dance
"Crayon"	G-Dragon	2012	Just Dance Unlimited
"Crazy Christmas" (R)	Santa Clones	2010	Just Dance 2 DLC
"Crazy Little Thing Called Love"	Queen	1979	Just Dance 3
"Criminal"	Natti Natasha and Ozuna	2017	Just Dance Unlimited
"Crucified"	Army of Lovers	1991	Just Dance 4
"Crying Blood"	V V Brown	2008	Just Dance 2 DLC
"Ça Plane Pour Moi"*	Plastic Bertrand (covered by Bob Platine)	1977	Just Dance 2019
"Daddy"	PSY featuring CL of 2NE1	2016	Just Dance 2017
"Daddy Cool"*	Boney M. (covered by Groove Century)	1976	Just Dance 2018
"Dagomba"	Sorcerer	2010	Just Dance 2
"Daisy"	Ashnikko	2020	Just Dance Unlimited
"Dame Tu Cosita"	El Chombo feat. Cutty Ranks	2018	Just Dance Unlimited
"Dance Monkey"	Tones and I	2019	Just Dance 2021
"Dancing Queen"	ABBA	1976	Just Dance Unlimited
"Dans van de Farao"	K3	2020	Just Dance Unlimited
"Danse (Pop version)"	Tal	2013	Just Dance 2014 (PAL)
"Dark Horse"	Katy Perry	2014	Just Dance 2015
"Ddu-Du Ddu-Du"	Blackpink	2018	Just Dance 2019
"Despacito"	Luis Fonsi and Daddy Yankee	2017	Just Dance 2018
"Dharma"	Headhunterz and KSHMR	2016	Just Dance 2018
"Dibby Dibby Sound"	DJ Fresh vs. Jay Fay featuring Ms. Dynamite	2014	Just Dance 2021
"Die Young"	Kesha	2012	Just Dance 4 DLC (Note: The remade version from Just Dance 2014 is used.)
"Diggin' in the Dirt"	Stefanie Heinzmann	2012	Just Dance 4 (PAL)
"Diggy"	Spencer Ludwig	2016	Just Dance 2018
"Disco Inferno"	The Trammps	1976	Just Dance 2023 Edition
"Djadja"	Aya Nakamura	2018	Just Dance 2020 (France)
"Domino"	Jessie J	2011	Just Dance 4 (Wii U)
"Don't Go Yet"	Camila Cabello	2021	Just Dance 2022
"Don't Let Me Down"	The Chainsmokers feat. Daya	2016	Just Dance Unlimited
"Don't Start Now"	Dua Lipa	2019	Just Dance 2021
"Don't Stop Me Now"	Queen	1979	Just Dance 2017
"Don't Wanna Know"	Maroon 5	2016	Just Dance 2017
"Don't Worry"	Madcon feat. Ray Dalton	2015	Just Dance Unlimited
"Don't Worry, Be Happy"*	Bobby McFerrin (covered by The Bench Men)	1988	Just Dance 2015
"Don't You Worry Child"	Swedish House Mafia feat. John Martin	2012	Just Dance 2014 DLC
"Down by the Riverside" (R)	The Reverend Horatio Duncan and Amos Sweets	1927	Just Dance 2 DLC
"Dragostea Din Tei"	O-Zone	2004	Just Dance 2017
"Drop the Mambo"	Diva Carmina	2015	Just Dance 2016
"Drum Go Dum"	K/DA featuring Aluna, Wolftyla and Bekuh Boom	2020	Just Dance Unlimited
"Dynamite" (R)	Taio Cruz	2010	Just Dance 3
"E.T." (R)	Katy Perry	2011	Just Dance 3 (Best Buy edition (NTSC)/special edition (PAL))
"El Tiki"	Maluma	2015	Just Dance 2017
"Epic Sirtaki"*	Zorba the Greek (covered by The Bouzouki's)	1964	Just Dance 2015
"Error"	Natalia Nykiel	2016	Just Dance Unlimited
"Everybody (Backstreet's Back)"*	Backstreet Boys (covered by Millennium Alert)	1997	Just Dance 2020
"Eye of the Tiger" (R)	Survivor	1982	Just Dance
"Fame"* (R)	Irene Cara (covered by The Girly Team)	1980	Just Dance
"Familiar"	Liam Payne and J Balvin	2018	Just Dance 2019
"Fancy"	Iggy Azalea feat. Charli XCX	2014	Just Dance 2016
"Fancy"	Twice	2019	Just Dance 2020
"Fancy Footwork"	Chromeo	2007	Just Dance 2020
"Feel It Still"	Portugal. The Man	2017	Just Dance Unlimited
"Feel So Right"	Imposs feat. Konshens	2013	Just Dance 2014
"Feel Special"	Twice	2019	Just Dance 2021
"Fine China"	Chris Brown	2013	Just Dance 2014
"Finesse (Remix)"	Bruno Mars feat. Cardi B	2018	Just Dance 2019
"Fire"	LLP feat. Mike Diamondz	2015	Just Dance 2019
"Fire on the Floor"	Michelle Delamor	2018	Just Dance 2019 (8th-gen unlockable)
"Firework" (R)	Katy Perry	2010	Just Dance 2 DLC
"Fit But You Know It"	The Streets	2004	Just Dance 2020
"Flash Pose"	Pabllo Vittar featuring Charli XCX	2019	Just Dance 2022
"Flashdance... What a Feeling"*	Irene Cara (covered by The Girly Team)	1983	Just Dance 2014
"Follow the White Rabbit"	Madison Beer	2021	Just Dance Unlimited
"Footloose"*	Kenny Loggins (covered by Top Culture)	1984	Just Dance 2018
"Forget You" (R)	CeeLo Green	2010	Just Dance 3
"Freed from Desire"	Gala	1996	Just Dance 2022
"Fun"	Pitbull feat. Chris Brown	2015	Just Dance 2016
"Funk"	Meghan Trainor	2020	Just Dance 2022
"Funky Town"* (R)	Lipps Inc. (covered by Sweat Invaders)	1980	Just Dance 2 (Best Buy edition) (NTSC)
"Futebol Crazy" (R)	The World Cup Girls	2010	Just Dance 2 DLC
"Gangnam Style"	Psy	2012	Just Dance 4 DLC
"Gentleman"	Psy	2013	Just Dance 2014
"Georgia"	Tiggs Da Author	2015	Just Dance 2021
"Get Busy"	Koyotie	2019	Just Dance 2020
"Get Get Down"	Paul Johnson	1999	Just Dance 2021
"Get Ugly"	Jason Derulo	2015	Just Dance Unlimited
"Ghost in the Keys"	Halloween Thrills	2016	Just Dance 2017
"Ghostbusters"	Ray Parker Jr.	1984	Just Dance 2014
"Gibberish"	Max	2015	Just Dance 2016
"Giddy On Up"	Laura Bell Bundy	2010	Just Dance 3
"Gimme! Gimme! Gimme! (A Man After Midnight)"	ABBA	1979	Just Dance 2014
"Girl Like Me"	Black Eyed Peas and Shakira	2020	Just Dance 2022
"Girlfriend"	Avril Lavigne	2007	Just Dance 2
"Girls Just Want to Have Fun" (R)	Cyndi Lauper	1983	Just Dance
"Girls Like"	Tinie Tempah featuring Zara Larsson	2016	Just Dance Unlimited
"God is a Woman"	Ariana Grande	2018	Just Dance 2020
"Gold Dust"	DJ Fresh	2010	Just Dance 4 DLC
"Good 4 U"	Olivia Rodrigo	2021	Just Dance 2022
"Good Feeling"	Flo Rida	2011	Just Dance 4
"Got That"	Gigi Rowe	2017	Just Dance 2018
"Groove"	Jack & Jack	2014	Just Dance 2017
"Hala Bel Khamis"	Maan Barghouth	2018	Just Dance Unlimited
"HandClap"	Fitz and the Tantrums	2016	Just Dance Unlimited
"Hangover (BaBaBa)"	Buraka Som Sistema	2011	Just Dance 2016
"Happy"	Pharrell Williams	2013	Just Dance 2015
"Havana"	Camila Cabello	2017	Just Dance 2019
"Heart Of Glass" (R)	Blondie	1979	Just Dance
"Heartbeat Song"	Kelly Clarkson	2015	Just Dance 2016
"Heavy Cross"	Gossip	2009	Just Dance 4 DLC
"Here Comes the Hotstepper"*	Ini Kamoze (covered The Hit Crew)	1994	Just Dance 2 DLC
"Hey Mama"	David Guetta feat. Nicki Minaj, Bebe Rexha and Afrojack	2015	Just Dance 2016
"Hey Ya!" (R)	OutKast	2003	Just Dance 2
"High Hopes"	Panic! at the Disco	2018	Just Dance 2020
"Hips Don't Lie"	Shakira feat. Wyclef Jean	2006	Just Dance 2017
"Hit 'Em Up Style (Oops!)"	Blu Cantrell	2001	Just Dance 4
"Hit the Lights"	Selena Gomez & The Scene	2012	Just Dance 4 DLC
"Hit the Road Jack"*	Ray Charles (covered by Charles Percy)	1961	Just Dance 2016
"Hold My Hand"	Jess Glynne	2015	Just Dance Unlimited
"Holding Out for a Hero"	Bonnie Tyler	1984	Just Dance 2015
"Holiday"* (R)	Madonna (covered by The Hit Crew)	1983	Just Dance 2
"Hot N Cold" (Chick version) (R)	Katy Perry	2008	Just Dance
"Hot Stuff"	Donna Summer	1979	Just Dance 2
"How Deep Is Your Love"	Calvin Harris and Disciples	2015	Just Dance Unlimited
"How Far I'll Go"*	Auliʻi Cravalho (covered and credited as Disney's Moana)	2016	Just Dance 2018
"Hungarian Dance No. 5"	Johannes Brahms (Brahms by Just Dance Classical Orchestra)	1880	Just Dance 3
"I Am the Best"	2NE1	2011	Just Dance 2020
"I Don't Care"	Ed Sheeran and Justin Bieber	2019	Just Dance 2020
"I Feel It Coming"	The Weeknd feat. Daft Punk	2016	Just Dance 2019
"I Feel Love"	Donna Summer	1977	Just Dance 3
"I Get Around"	The Beach Boys	1966	Just Dance
"I Gotta Feeling"	The Black Eyed Peas	2009	Just Dance 2016
"I Kissed A Girl"	Katy Perry	2008	Just Dance 2014
"I Like It"	The Blackout Allstars	1994	Just Dance 4
"I Like It"	Cardi B, Bad Bunny and J Balvin	2018	Just Dance 2020
"I Love Rock 'n' Roll"*	Joan Jett & The Blackhearts (covered by Fast Forward Highway)	1975	Just Dance 2017
"I Need Your Love"	Calvin Harris feat. Ellie Goulding	2013	Just Dance 2014 DLC
"I Was Made for Lovin' You"	Kiss	1979	Just Dance 3
"I Will Survive"	Gloria Gaynor	1978	Just Dance 2014
"I Want You Back" (R)	Jackson 5	1969	Just Dance 2
"I'm an Albatraoz"	AronChupa	2014	Just Dance 2016
"I'm Still Standing"*	Elton John (covered by Top Culture)	1983	Just Dance 2019
"Ice Cream"	Blackpink and Selena Gomez	2020	Just Dance 2021
"Idealistic" (R)	Digitalism	2007	Just Dance 2
"Ievan Polkka" (Note: Also known in the Chinese version of Just Dance 2020 as "Shuai Cong Ge")	Hatsune Miku	2007	Just Dance 2016
"Imya 505"	Vremya i Steklo	2016	Just Dance Unlimited
"India Waale"	KK, Neeti Mohan, Shankar Mahadevan and Vishal Dadlani (credited as "From Happy New Year")	2014	Just Dance 2015 DLC
"Instruction"	Jax Jones feat. Demi Lovato and Stefflon Don	2017	Just Dance 2018
"Infernal Gallop (Can-Can)"	The Just Dance Orchestra	1858	Just Dance 2020
"Into the Unknown"	Idina Menzel feat. Aurora (credited as Disney's Frozen II)	2019	Just Dance 2020 (8th-gen & Stadia)
"Into You"	Ariana Grande	2016	Just Dance 2017
"Irish Meadow Dance"	O'Callaghan's Orchestra	2015	Just Dance 2016
"Isidora"	Bog Bog Orkestar	2013	Just Dance 2014
"Istanbul (Not Constantinople)"	They Might Be Giants	1990	Just Dance 4
"It's Raining Men"	The Weather Girls	1982	Just Dance 2
"It's You"	Duck Sauce	2013	Just Dance 2014
"Jai Ho! (You Are My Destiny)" (R)	A.R. Rahman and the Pussycat Dolls feat. Nicole Scherzinger	2009	Just Dance 2 (Best Buy edition) (NTSC)
"Jailhouse Rock"	Elvis Presley	1957	Just Dance 4
"Jambo Mambo"	Ole Orquesta	2011	Just Dance 3 DLC
"Je sais pas danser"	Natoo	2016	Just Dance Unlimited
"John Wayne"	Lady Gaga	2016	Just Dance 2018
"Juju on That Beat (TZ Anthem)"	Zay Hilfigerrr and Zayion McCall	2016	Just Dance Unlimited
"Jump"	Major Lazer feat. Busy Signal	2017	Just Dance Unlimited
"Jump (For My Love)"	Girls Aloud	2003	Just Dance 3
"Junto a Ti"	Martina Stoessel and Lodovica Comello (covered and credited as Disney's Violetta)	2012	Just Dance 2016
"Just a Gigolo"	Louis Prima	1956	Just Dance 2014
"Just an Illusion"*	Imagination (covered by Equinox Stars)	1982	Just Dance 2020
"Just Dance"	Lady Gaga feat. Colby O'Donis	2008	Just Dance 2014
"J'suis pas jalouse"	Andy	2017	Just Dance Unlimited
"Kaboom Pow"	Nikki Yanofsky	2014	Just Dance 2016
"Karaoke Forever - Future Underworld Mix" (Note: Also known in the Chinese version of Just Dance 2017 as "Qia La Yong Yuan OK - Future Underworld Mix")	Alan Tam	1990	Just Dance 2017 (Chinese edition)
"Katti Kalandal" (R)	Bollywood	1980	Just Dance 2
"Keep in Touch"	JD McCrary	2019	Just Dance 2020
"Keep On Moving"	Michelle Delamor	2017	Just Dance 2018
"Kill This Love"	Blackpink	2019	Just Dance 2020
"Kiss Me More"	Doja Cat featuring SZA	2021	Just Dance Unlimited
"Kool Kontact"	Glorious Black Belts	2015	Just Dance 2016
"Kung Fu Fighting"	Carl Douglas	1974	Just Dance 2 DLC
"Kurio ko uddah le jana" (Note: The original title of the song is "Didi Tera Devar Deewana".)	Lata Mangeshkar and S. P. Balasubrahmanyam (credited as Bollywood Rainbow)	1994	Just Dance 3
"Last Christmas"*	Wham! (covered by Santa Clones)	1984	Just Dance 2017
"La Bicicleta"	Carlos Vives and Shakira	2016	Just Dance 2017
"Land of 1000 Dances"	Wilson Pickett	1966	Just Dance 3
"Le Bal Masqué"*	La Compagnie Créole (covered by Dr. Creole)	1984	Just Dance 2020
"Le Freak"	Chic	1978	Just Dance
"Lean On"	Major Lazer and DJ Snake feat. MØ	2015	Just Dance 2017
"Leg Song" (Note: Also known in the Chinese version of Just Dance 2017 as "Tui Zhi Ge".)	Lulu	2016	Just Dance 2017 (Chinese edition)
"Leila"	Cheb Salama	2016	Just Dance 2017
"Let It Go"*	Idina Menzel (covered and credited as Disney's Frozen)	2013	Just Dance 2015
"Let Me Love You"	DJ Snake feat. Justin Bieber	2016	Just Dance 2017 (Ubisoft Club)
"Let's Groove"*	Earth, Wind & Fire (covered by Equinox Stars)	1981	Just Dance 2016
"Lights"	Ellie Goulding	2011	Just Dance 2016
"Like I Would"	Zayn	2016	Just Dance 2017
"Little Swing"	AronChupa feat. Little Sis Nora	2016	Just Dance 2017
"Lollipop"	Mika	2007	Just Dance 3
"Love Boat"*	Jack Jones (covered by Frankie Bostello)	1979	Just Dance 2014
"Love Is All"*	Roger Glover (covered by The Sunlight Shakers)	1974	Just Dance 2015
“Love Me Again”	John Newman	2013	Just Dance 2015
"Love Ward"	Hatsune Miku	2009	Just Dance 2018
"Love You Like A Love Song"	Selena Gomez & The Scene	2011	Just Dance 4
"Lush Life"	Zara Larsson	2015	Just Dance Unlimited
"Ma Itu"	Stella Mwangi	2019	Just Dance 2020
"Macarena"*	Los Del Rio (covered by The Girly Team)	1995	Just Dance 2015
"Mad Love"	Sean Paul and David Guetta feat. Becky G	2018	Just Dance 2019
"Magenta Riddim"	DJ Snake	2018	Just Dance 2021
"Mas Que Nada"	Sérgio Mendes feat. The Black Eyed Peas	2006	Just Dance 4
"Make It Jingle"	Big Freedia	2016	Just Dance 2018
"Make Me Feel"	Janelle Monáe	2018	Just Dance 2019 (8th-gen)
"Mamasita" (R)	Latino Sunset	2011	Just Dance 3
"Mambo No. 5 (A Little Bit of Monika)"	Lou Bega (credited as The Lemon Cubes)	1999	Just Dance 2 DLC
"Maneater"	Nelly Furtado	2006	Just Dance 4
"Maps"	Maroon 5	2014	Just Dance 2015
"Mashed Potato Time"	Dee Dee Sharp	1962	Just Dance
"Mayores"	Becky G feat. Bad Bunny	2017	Just Dance Unlimited
"Me Too"	Meghan Trainor	2016	Just Dance Unlimited
"Medicina"	Anitta	2018	Just Dance Unlimited
"Mi Gente"	J Balvin and Willy William	2017	Just Dance Unlimited
"Mi Mi Mi"*	Serebro (covered by Hit The Electro Beat)	2013	Just Dance 2019
"Miłość w Zakopanem"	Sławomir	2017	Just Dance 2019
"Miss Understood"	Sammie	2013	Just Dance 2014
"Moskau"*	Dschinghis Khan (covered by Dancing Bros.)	1979	Just Dance 2014
"Monster Mash"*	Bobby "Boris" Pickett (covered by The Frightners)	1962	Just Dance 2
"More"	K/DA featuring Madison Beer, (G)I-dle, Lexie Liu, Jaira Burns and Seraphine	2021	Just Dance 2023 Edition
"Move Your Feet"	Junior Senior	2003	Just Dance 2
"Movement is Happiness (Find Your Thing)"	Avishay Goren and Yossi Cohen	2014	Just Dance 2015 (PAL unlockable/NTSC DLC)
"Moves Like Jagger"	Maroon 5 feat. Christina Aguilera	2011	Just Dance 4
"Mr. Saxobeat"	Alexandra Stan	2011	Just Dance 4
"Mugsy Baloney" (R)	Charleston	1924	Just Dance 2
"My Main Girl"	MainStreet	2013	Just Dance 2014 DLC
"My New Swag"	Vava feat. Ty and Nina Wang	2017	Just Dance 2020
"Narco"	Blasterjaxx and Timmy Trumpet	2017	Just Dance 2019
"Naughty Girl"	Beyoncé	2004	Just Dance 2018
"Never Can Say Goodbye"	Gloria Gaynor	1974	Just Dance 2015
"Never Gonna Give You Up" (R)	Rick Astley	1987	Just Dance 4
"New Reality"	Gigi Rowe	2018	Just Dance 2019
"New Rules"	Dua Lipa	2017	Just Dance 2019
"New World"	Krewella and Yellow Claw feat. Vava	2018	Just Dance 2019
"Nine in the Afternoon"	Panic! at the Disco	2008	Just Dance 2 DLC
"Nitro Bot"	Sentai Express	2013	Just Dance 2014
"No Control"	One Direction	2014	Just Dance 2016
"No Lie"	Sean Paul feat. Dua Lipa	2016	Just Dance Unlimited
"No Limit" (R)	2 Unlimited	1993	Just Dance 3
"No Tears Left to Cry"	Ariana Grande	2018	Just Dance 2019
"Not Your Ordinary"	Stella Mwangi	2017	Just Dance 2019
"Oath"	Cher Lloyd feat. Becky G	2012	Just Dance 4 DLC
"Obsesión"	Aventura	2002	Just Dance 2019
"Oh No!"	Marina and the Diamonds	2010	Just Dance 4
"Oishii Oishii"	Wanko Ni Mero Mero	2016	Just Dance 2017
"Old Town Road (Remix)"	Lil Nas X feat. Billy Ray Cyrus	2019	Just Dance 2020
"OMG"	Arash feat. Snoop Dogg	2016	Just Dance 2019
"On Ne Porte Pas De Sous-Vêtements"	McFly & Carlito	2018	Just Dance Unlimited
"Ona Tańczy Dla Mnie"	Weekend	2012	Just Dance Unlimited
"One Kiss"	Calvin Harris and Dua Lipa	2018	Just Dance 2019
"One Way or Another (Teenage Kicks)"	One Direction	2013	Just Dance 2014 DLC
"Oops!... I Did It Again"*	Britney Spears (covered by The Girly Team)	2000	Just Dance 4
"Pac-Man"	Dancing Bros.	1980	Just Dance 2019
"Paca Dance"	The Just Dance Band	2020	Just Dance 2021
"Part of Me"	Katy Perry	2012	Just Dance 4 DLC
"Party Rock Anthem" (R)	LMFAO feat. Lauren Bennett and GoonRock	2011	Just Dance 3
"Peanut Butter Jelly"	Galantis	2015	Just Dance Unlimited
"Policeman"	Eva Simons feat. Konshens	2015	Just Dance 2020
"PoPiPo"	Hatsune Miku	2008	Just Dance 2017
"Positions"	Ariana Grande	2020	Just Dance Unlimited
"Poster Girl"	Zara Larsson	2021	Just Dance 2022
"Pound the Alarm"	Nicki Minaj	2012	Just Dance 2014
"Primadonna"	Marina and the Diamonds	2012	Just Dance 4 DLC
"Prince Ali"*	Robin Williams (covered and credited as Disney's Aladdin)	1992	Just Dance 2014
"Professor Pumplestickle"	Nick Phoenix and Thomas J. Bergersen	2006	Just Dance 2 DLC
"Promiscuous"	Nelly Furtado feat. Timbaland	2006	Just Dance 3
"Que Tire Pa Lante"	Daddy Yankee	2019	Just Dance 2021
"Rabiosa"	Shakira feat. El Cata	2011	Just Dance 2016
"Radical"	Dyro and Dannic	2014	Just Dance 2017
"Rain Over Me"	Pitbull feat. Marc Anthony	2011	Just Dance 2020
"Rasputin" (R)	Boney M.	1978	Just Dance 2
"Rhythm of the Night"*	Corona (covered by Ultraclub 90)	1993	Just Dance 2019
"Risky Business"	Jorge Blanco	2017	Just Dance 2018
"Roar"	Katy Perry	2013	Just Dance 2014 DLC
"Rock n' Roll (Will Take You to the Mountain)"	Skrillex	2010	Just Dance 4
"Rock n Roll"	Avril Lavigne	2013	Just Dance 2014 DLC
"Rockabye"	Clean Bandit feat. Sean Paul and Anne-Marie	2016	Just Dance 2018
"Rockafeller Skank"	Fatboy Slim	1998	Just Dance 2
"Run the Night"	Gigi Rowe	2016	Just Dance 2017
"Safe and Sound" (R)	Capital Cities	2011	Just Dance 2014 (Fructis promotion)
"Sangria Wine"	Pharrell Williams and Camila Cabello	2018	Just Dance 2019
"Satellite"	Lena	2010	Just Dance 3 (PAL)
"Sax"	Fleur East	2015	Just Dance Unlimited
"Say So"	Doja Cat	2019	Just Dance 2021
"Sayonara"	Wanko Ni Mero Mero	2017	Just Dance 2018
"Scream & Shout"	will.i.am feat. Britney Spears	2012	Just Dance 2017
"Señorita"	Shawn Mendes and Camila Cabello	2019	Just Dance 2021
"September"*	Earth, Wind & Fire (covered by Equinox Stars)	1978	Just Dance 2017
"Sexy and I Know It"	LMFAO	2011	Just Dance 2014 DLC
"Shaky Shaky"	Daddy Yankee	2016	Just Dance 2019
"Shape of You"	Ed Sheeran	2017	Just Dance 2018
"She's Got Me Dancing" (R)	Tommy Sparks	2009	Just Dance 3
"Shut Up and Dance"	Walk the Moon	2014	Just Dance Unlimited
"Side to Side"	Ariana Grande feat. Nicki Minaj	2016	Just Dance 2018
"Single Ladies (Put a Ring on It)"	Beyoncé	2008	Just Dance 2017
"Skibidi"	Little Big	2018	Just Dance 2020
"Slumber Party"	Britney Spears feat. Tinashe	2016	Just Dance 2018
"Smile"	IOWA	2013	Just Dance Unlimited
"So Glamorous"	The Girly Team	2012	Just Dance 4 DLC
"Somethin' Stupid"	Robbie Williams and Nicole Kidman	2001	Just Dance 3
"Soy Yo"	Bomba Estéreo	2015	Just Dance 2020
"Sorry"	Justin Bieber	2015	Just Dance 2017
"Soul Searchin'"	Groove Century	2011	Just Dance 3 DLC
"Spectronizer"	Sentai Express	2011	Just Dance 3
"Stadium Flow"	Imposs	2015	Just Dance 2016
"Starships"	Nicki Minaj	2012	Just Dance 2014
"Step by Step" (R)	New Kids on the Block	1990	Just Dance
"Stop Movin'"	Royal Republic	2019	Just Dance 2020
"Stuck on a Feeling"	Prince Royce	2014	Just Dance 2016
"Sugar"	Maroon 5	2015	Just Dance 2019
"Sugar Dance"	The Just Dance Band	2017	Just Dance 2018 (8th-gen unlockable)
"Summer"	Calvin Harris	2014	Just Dance 2015
"Sun"	Demo	1999	Just Dance Unlimited
"Super Bass"	Nicki Minaj	2011	Just Dance 4
"Superstition"	Stevie Wonder	1972	Just Dance 4
"Sushi"	Merk & Kremont	2018	Just Dance 2020
"Sway (Quien Sera)"* (R)	Michael Bublé (covered by Marine Band)	2004	Just Dance 2
"Sweet Little Unforgettable Thing"	Bea Miller	2018	Just Dance 2019
"Sweet Sensation"	Flo Rida	2018	Just Dance 2019
"Swish Swish"	Katy Perry feat. Nicki Minaj	2017	Just Dance 2018
"Só Depois do Carnaval"	Lexa	2019	Just Dance 2020
"Take Me Out"	Franz Ferdinand	2004	Just Dance 2
"Take On Me"	A-ha	1985	Just Dance 3
"Taki Taki"	DJ Snake feat. Selena Gomez, Ozuna and Cardi B	2018	Just Dance 2020
"Talk"	Khalid	2019	Just Dance 2020
"Taste the Feeling"	Avicii vs. Conrad Sewell	2016	Just Dance Unlimited
"Te Dominar"	Daya Luz	2016	Just Dance 2017
"Teacher"	Nick Jonas	2014	Just Dance 2016
"Teenage Dream" (R)	Katy Perry	2010	Just Dance 3 (Best Buy edition (NTSC)/special edition (PAL))
"Tel Aviv"	Omer Adam feat. Arisa	2013	Just Dance 2020
"That's Not My Name"	The Ting Tings	2008	Just Dance 2
"That's the Way (I Like It)" (R)	KC and the Sunshine Band	1975	Just Dance
"#thatPower"	will.i.am feat. Justin Bieber	2013	Just Dance 2014
"The Choice is Yours"	Darius Dante van Dijk	2015	Just Dance 2016
"The Final Countdown"	Europe	1986	Just Dance 4
"The Greatest"	Sia	2016	Just Dance Unlimited
"The Master Blaster"	Inspector Marceau	2011	Just Dance 3
"The Other Side"	Jason Derulo	2013	Just Dance 2014 (NTSC exclusive/PAL DLC)
"The Time (Dirty Bit)"	The Black Eyed Peas	2010	Just Dance 2020
"The Way"	Ariana Grande feat. Mac Miller	2013	Just Dance 2014
"The Way I Are (Dance with Somebody)"	Bebe Rexha feat. Lil Wayne	2017	Just Dance 2018
"The World is Ours"	David Correy feat. Monobloco	2014	Just Dance 2014 DLC
"There is Nothing Better in the World"	Oleg Anofriyev (credited as Bremenskiye Muzykanty)	1969	Just Dance Unlimited
"These Boots Are Made for Walkin'"*	Nancy Sinatra (covered by The Girly Team)	1966	Just Dance 2016
"This Is Halloween"	Danny Elfman	1993	Just Dance 3
"This Is How We Do"	Katy Perry	2014	Just Dance 2016
"Thumbs"	Sabrina Carpenter	2016	Just Dance 2018 (Ubisoft Connect)
"Tico-Tico no Fubá"*	Zequinha de Abreu (covered by The Frankie Bostello Orchestra)	1917	Just Dance 2017
"Tik Tok"	Kesha	2009	Just Dance 2
"Till I Find You"	Austin Mahone	2014	Just Dance 2015 (NTSC exclusive/PAL DLC)
"Time Warp"*	Cast of The Rocky Horror Picture Show (covered by Halloween Thrills)	1975	Just Dance 4
"Titanium"	David Guetta feat. Sia	2011	Just Dance 2017
"Toy"	Netta	2018	Just Dance 2019
"Tribal Dance"	2 Unlimited	1993	Just Dance 4
"Tumbum"	Yemi Alade	2016	Just Dance 2018
"Turn Up the Love"	Far East Movement feat. Cover Drive	2012	Just Dance 2014
"Twist and Shake it" (R)	The Girly Team	2008	Just Dance 3 DLC
"U Can't Touch This"	MC Hammer	1990	Just Dance
"Ugly Beauty"	Jolin Tsai	2018	Just Dance 2020
"Un Poco Loco"*	Anthony Gonzalez and Gael García Bernal (covered and credited as Disney-Pixar's Coco)	2017	Just Dance 2019
"Under the Sea"*	Samuel E. Wright (Covered and credited as Disney's The Little Mermaid)	1989	Just Dance 2016
"Uptown Funk"	Mark Ronson feat. Bruno Mars	2014	Just Dance 2016
"Venus"	Bananarama	1986	Just Dance 3
"Vodovorot"	XS Project	2011	Just Dance 2020
"Waka Waka (This Time for Africa)"	Shakira	2010	Just Dance 2018
"Wake Me Up"	Avicii feat. Aloe Blacc	2013	Just Dance 2014 DLC
"Wake Me Up Before You Go-Go"	Wham!	1984	Just Dance 2
"Waking Up in Vegas"	Katy Perry	2009	Just Dance 2014 (Popchips promotion & DLC) (Note: A prototype version, first shown in the Just Dance Unlimited service for Just Dance 2017, was temporarily used before it was fixed with the actual version.)
"Walk Like An Egyptian"	The Bangles	1986	Just Dance 2
"Walk This Way"	Run–D.M.C. and Aerosmith	1986	Just Dance 2015
"Want to Want Me"	Jason Derulo	2015	Just Dance 2016
"Want U Back"	Cher Lloyd feat. Astro	2012	Just Dance 4 (Wii U)
"Watch Me (Whip/Nae Nae)"	Silentó	2015	Just Dance 2017
"Water Me"	Lizzo	2017	Just Dance 2019
"We R Who We R"	Kesha	2010	Just Dance 4 DLC
"We No Speak Americano"*	Yolanda Be Cool and DCUP (covered by Hit the Electro Beat)	2010	Just Dance 4
"What About Love"	Austin Mahone	2013	Just Dance 2014 DLC
"What Is Love"*	Haddaway (covered by Ultraclub 90)	1993	Just Dance 2017
"What Lovers Do"	Maroon 5 feat. SZA	2017	Just Dance Unlimited
"When the Rain Begins to Fall"*	Jermaine Jackson and Pia Zadora (covered by Sky Trucking)	1984	Just Dance 2016
"Where Are You Now?"	Lady Leshurr feat. Wiley	2016	Just Dance 2019
"Wherever I Go"	OneRepublic	2016	Just Dance 2017
"Who Let the Dogs Out?"*	Baha Men (covered by The Sunlight Shakers)	2000	Just Dance
"Wild"	Jessie J feat. Big Sean	2013	Just Dance 2014
"William Tell - Overture"	Rossini	1828	Just Dance 2016
"Without Me"	Eminem	2002	Just Dance 2020
"Work Work"	Britney Spears	2013	Just Dance 2019
"Worth It"	Fifth Harmony feat. Kid Ink	2015	Just Dance 2017
"XMas Tree"	Bollywood Santa	2014	Just Dance 2015
"Y.M.C.A."	Village People	1978	Just Dance 2014
"You Can't Hurry Love"	The Supremes	1966	Just Dance 2 DLC
"You Don't Know Me"	Jax Jones feat. Raye	2016	Just Dance Unlimited
"You Make Me Feel..."	Cobra Starship feat. Sabi	2011	Just Dance 4 (Cheetos promotion & DLC) (Note: The DLC version is used.)
"You Never Can Tell"*	Chuck Berry (covered by A. Caveman and the Backseats)	1964	Just Dance 2016
"You Spin Me Round (Like a Record)"	Dead or Alive	1985	Just Dance 2015
"You're on My Mind"	Imposs feat. J. Perry	2014	Just Dance 2015
"You're the First, the Last, My Everything"	Barry White	1974	Just Dance 4
"You're the One That I Want"*	John Travolta and Olivia Newton-John (covered and credited as "From the movie Grease")	1978	Just Dance 2016
"Youth"	Troye Sivan	2015	Just Dance Unlimited

Note: All songs are playable by Mojo coins, however, spending coins will only play it once for 100 Mojo coins. The limit is 200 Mojo coins (2 plays) with a 24 hour cooldown after using it.

- A "*" indicates that the song is a cover version, not the original.
- () parentheses in the Artist column indicate the cover artist or the actual credit of the song.
- An "(R)" indicates that the routine for the song has been remade, and differs from the original design from its debut.

=== Kids ===
The following list contains songs that had previously appeared in the Kids Mode of Just Dance 2018 and Just Dance 2019, and from the Just Dance Kids series:

Song	Artist	Year	Original game
"A Pirate You Shall Be"	Tom Zehnder	2013	Just Dance Kids 2014
"Accidentally in Love" (Note: "Accidentally in Love" was originally covered by The Just Dance Kids in Just Dance Kids 2. However, the original version of the song was used in Just Dance Now even though it uses the same background and dancers and Counting Crows is credited as The Just Dance Kids.)	Counting Crows (credited as The Just Dance Kids)	2004	Just Dance Kids 2
"Alphabet Song"	The Just Dance Kids	Traditional	Just Dance Kids
"Amazing Girl"	The Girly Team	2017	Just Dance 2018 (Kids Mode)
"Boogiesaurus"	A. Caveman & The Backseats	2018	Just Dance 2019 (Kids Mode)
"Cosmic Party"	Equinox Stars	2018	Just Dance 2019 (Kids Mode)
"Day-O (The Banana Boat Song)"*	Harry Belafonte (covered by The Just Dance Kids)	1956	Just Dance Kids 2014
"Fearless Pirate"	Marine Band	2016	Just Dance 2018 (Kids Mode)
"Five Little Monkeys"	The Just Dance Kids	Traditional	Just Dance Kids 2
"Footloose"*	Kenny Loggins (covered by Top Culture)	1984	Just Dance 2018 (Kids Mode)
"Fraggle Rock Theme"	Cast of Fraggle Rock (credited as The Just Dance Kids)	1983	Just Dance Kids 2014
"Funky Robot"	Dancing Bros.	2017	Just Dance 2018 (Kids Mode)
"Happy Farm"	Groove Century	2017	Just Dance 2018 (Kids Mode)
"Hickory Dickory Dock"	Tom Zehnder	2007	Just Dance Kids 2014
"I Like to Move It"*	Reel 2 Real feat. The Mad Stuntman (covered by The Just Dance Kids)	1993	Just Dance Kids 2014
"I've Been Working on the Railroad"	The Just Dance Kids	2010	Just Dance Kids
"If You're Happy and You Know It"	The Just Dance Kids	Traditional	Just Dance Kids
"Irish Meadow Dance"	O'Callaghan's Orchestra	2015	Just Dance 2019 (Kids Mode)
"Jingle Bells" (Note: Both routines have the same music, singing voices and lyrics.)	Santa Clones	2018	Just Dance 2019 (Kids Mode)
"Jingle Bells"	The Just Dance Kids	2011	Just Dance Kids 2
"Magic Halloween"	Halloween Thrills	2017	Just Dance 2018 (Kids Mode)
"Mary Had a Little Lamb"	Tom Zehnder	Traditional	Just Dance Kids 2014
"Monsters of Jazz"	Groove Century	2018	Just Dance 2019 (Kids Mode)
"Pixie Land"	The Sunlight Shakers	2017	Just Dance 2018 (Kids Mode)
"Shinobi Cat"	Glorious Black Belts	2018	Just Dance 2019 (Kids Mode)
"Tales of the Desert"	Persian Nights	2018	Just Dance 2019 (Kids Mode)
"The Lion Sleeps Tonight"*	The Tokens (covered by The Just Dance Kids)	1961	Just Dance Kids 2
"Waka Waka (This Time for Africa)"	Shakira	2010	Just Dance 2018 (Kids Mode)
"We Go Well Together"	Goldheart	2000	Just Dance Kids 2014
"Wheels on the Bus"	The Just Dance Kids	1939	Just Dance Kids

Note: All songs are playable by Mojo coins, however, spending coins will only play it once.

- A "*" indicates that the song is a cover version, not the original.
- () parentheses in the Artist column indicate the cover artist or the actual credit of the song.

=== ABBA: You Can Dance ===
The following list are songs by ABBA that had previously appeared in the series' spin-off game, ABBA: You Can Dance:

Song	Year
"Dancing Queen"	1976
"Fernando"	1976
"Gimme! Gimme! Gimme! (A Man After Midnight)"	1979
"Honey, Honey"	1974
"Knowing Me, Knowing You"	1977
"Lay All Your Love on Me"	1980
"Mamma Mia"	1975
"Money, Money, Money"	1976
"SOS"	1975
"Super Trouper"	1980
"Take a Chance on Me"	1978
"The Winner Takes It All"	1980
"Voulez-Vous"	1979
"Waterloo"	1974

Note: All songs are playable by Mojo coins, however, spending coins will only play it once.
