= Just Dance Kids 2014 =

2013 video game

- North American Xbox 360 box art
- Developer: Ubisoft Osaka
- Publisher: Ubisoft
- Director: Jeremy Haft
- Producer: Nao Higo
- Composers: Tom Zehnder, Jeff Lopas, Emiliano Almeida, Brian Hazard, Matt Myers
- Series: Just Dance
- Platforms: Wii, Wii U, Xbox 360
- Release: NA: October 22, 2013; AU: October 24, 2013; EU: October 25, 2013
- Genres: Music, Rhythm
- Modes: Single player, multiplayer

Just Dance Kids 2014 is a 2013 video game for the Wii, Wii U and Kinect for Xbox 360. It is the 13th game released as a part of Ubisoft's Just Dance franchise and the third and final installment produced for the Just Dance Kids spin-off series. Like its predecessors, Just Dance Kids 2014 is a dance-based music game with an emphasis on songs that are popular with children. The game includes original music designed for children, popular music appropriate for children, and music from children's media and nursery rhymes. This edition was released on October 22, 2013 in North America, October 24, 2013 in Australia, and October 25, 2013 in Europe and contains 31 songs. The game was directed by Jeremy Haft and the original music was provided by Boston Soundlabs, with David Ortega serving as executive music producer.

== Gameplay ==
Just Dance Kids 2014 features the same gameplay mechanics as the rest of Ubisoft's Just Dance franchise. Players receive points by copying on-screen actors' dance moves to the beat of the music to complete a dance routine. As the players dance, animated score icons appear on screen to evaluate each movement based on accuracy. The on-screen actors seen in Just Dance Kids 2014 are real dancers wearing more conservative clothing or costumes compared to the original series. Depending on which device the game is played on, Just Dance Kids 2014 can be played with motion controllers using the Wii Remote or motion cameras using the Xbox 360 Kinect. The Kinect motion sensing camera allows the dancers to be scored on full body movement, rather than one handed movement tracked by the Wii Remote. Kinect also provides a playback option that allows the player to watch their performance after they have completed the routine.

== Track listing ==
Song	Artist	Year
"7 8 9"	Barenaked Ladies	2008
"Day-O (The Banana Boat Song)"	Harry Belafonte	1956
"Do You Love Me"	The Contours	1962
"Fireflies"	Owl City	2009
"Footloose"	Kenny Loggins	1984
"Fraggle Rock Theme"	Cast of Fraggle Rock	1983
"The Freeze Game"	Yo Gabba Gabba!	2008
"Get Down on It"	Kool & the Gang	1981
"Get Ready to Wiggle"	The Wiggles	1999
"Give Your Heart a Break"	Demi Lovato	2012
"Hickory Dickory Dock"	Tom Zehnder	2013
"Hit Me with Your Best Shot"	Pat Benatar	1980
"Hit the Lights"	Selena Gomez & the Scene	2012
"The Hustle"	Van McCoy	1975
"I Like to Move It"	Reel 2 Real featuring The Mad Stuntman	1993
"Interstellar Simon"	Color Theory	2001
"Magic Carpet Ride"	Steppenwolf	1968
"Make It Shine (Victorious Theme Song)"	Victoria Justice	2010
"Mary Had a Little Lamb"	Tom Zehnder	2013
"One Thing"	One Direction	2012
"Party in the Kitchen"	Tom Zehnder	2013
"A Pirate You Shall Be"	Tom Zehnder	2001
"Power Ups"	LeetStreet Boys	2013
"Problem"	Becky G featuring will.i.am	2012
"Put Your Hearts Up"	Ariana Grande	2011
"Ready or Not"	Bridgit Mendler	2012
"Shout"	The Isley Brothers	1959
"Skip to My Lou"	Tom Zehnder	2013
"The Tiki Tiki Tiki Room"	Sherman Brothers	1963
"Walking on Sunshine"	Katrina and the Waves	1985
"We Go Well Together"	Goldheart	2013

== Reception ==
=== Ratings ===
Just Dance Kids 2014 received an E rating for mild lyrics by ESRB, as opposed to the original series' rating of E10+. While songs, dance moves, and visuals are targeted to younger audiences, the song "Day-O (The Banana Boat Song)" mentions rum in the lyrics.

=== Reviews ===
Just Dance Kids 2014 includes 31 songs that would appeal to older children, but remain appropriate for a younger crowd. There are more limited features and the song list cannot be expanded. However, according to game reviews, Just Dance Kids 2014 is recommended for families to play together. Nintendo Life rates Just Dance Kids 2014 "Good", with a 7 out of 10 stars, scoring it above average among other games of the same genre.

=== Academic Research ===
Academics have studied the effects of fitness games, including Just Dance Kids 2014, on children's fitness. While active video games increase children's physical activity, one study found that when children enjoyed the game, playing it over time eventually led to decreased physical activity intensity. However, they still maintained positive attitudes and achieved similar fitness levels regardless of feedback from the game.

=== Awards and nominations ===
In 2014, the game was nominated for a British Academy Children's Award. It was nominated for the BAFTA Kids' Vote category for Best Video Game, but lost to Minecraft.

== Continuation ==
Just Dance Kids 2014 was the final installment produced for the Just Dance Kids series, however, the Just Dance franchise continued to market the children's and family audiences. Just Dance games released from 2017 to 2021 feature a separate gameplay option called Kids Mode, which is available on Just Dance 2018, 2019, 2020, 2021, and 2022. Kids Mode, like Just Dance Kids, contains music and choreography adapted for children, designed by development experts to encourage promote active and healthy movement. As opposed to the games' primary scoring system, which uses words like "good" or "perfect" when evaluating dance moves, Kids Mode uses words such as "haha", "yay" and "wow". In Kids Mode, players cannot receive rewards, mojos, XP, or compete in challenges.
