= Just Dance 2022 =

2021 video game

- Developers: Ubisoft Paris; Ubisoft Pune; Ubisoft Shanghai; Room8
- Publisher: Ubisoft
- Series: Just Dance
- Engine: UbiArt Framework
- Platforms: Nintendo Switch; PlayStation 4; PlayStation 5; Xbox One; Xbox Series X/S; Stadia
- Release: November 4, 2021
- Genre: Music
- Modes: Single-player; Multiplayer

Just Dance 2022 is a 2021 dance rhythm game developed and published by Ubisoft. It was unveiled on June 12, 2021, during the Ubisoft Forward E3 web presentation as the thirteenth main installment of the series, and was released on November 4, 2021, for Nintendo Switch, PlayStation 4, PlayStation 5, Xbox One, Xbox Series X/S, and Stadia. This is the final installment released for PlayStation 4, Xbox One and Stadia (before its closure on January 18, 2023), the final installment to support PlayStation Move and camera devices and the last known game overall to support Kinect.

== Gameplay ==
Gameplay of "Boombayah", a song in Just Dance 2022

As with the previous installments of the franchise, players must mimic the on-screen dancer's choreography to a chosen song using either motion controllers (PlayStation Move and PlayStation Camera on PlayStation 4, Kinect on Xbox One, and Joy-Con on Nintendo Switch) or the game's associated smartphone app. The Stadia version also allows the use of a gamepad and a keyboard for menu navigation.

Its user interface and features are largely identical to those of Just Dance 2019, Just Dance 2020 and Just Dance 2021, with no new features added.

== Soundtrack ==
The following songs appear on Just Dance 2022:

Song	Artist	Year
"Baianá"	Bakermat	2019
"Believer"	Imagine Dragons	2017
"Black Mamba"	Aespa	2020
"Boombayah"	Blackpink	2016
"Boss Witch" (Note: Reworked cover of "Boss Bitch" with different lyrics, credited as "Boss Witch (Ubisoft clean cover)")	Skarlett Klaw (cover by Devmo) (as made famous by Doja Cat)	2020
"Build a Bitch" (Note: Censored in the game as "Build a B****", audio referent to the "Build a Babe" radio edit.)	Bella Poarch	2021
"Buttons" (Note: Not available in the Korean version) (Note: Only playable with an internet connection)	The Pussycat Dolls featuring Snoop Dogg	2006
"Chacarron"	El Chombo	2005
"Chandelier"	Sia	2014
"China"	Anuel AA, Daddy Yankee, Karol G, Ozuna and J Balvin	2019
"Don't Go Yet"	Camila Cabello	2021
"Flash Pose"	Pabllo Vittar featuring Charli XCX	2019
"Freed from Desire"	Gala	1996
"Funk"	Meghan Trainor	2020
"Girl Like Me"	Black Eyed Peas and Shakira	2020
"Good 4 U"	Olivia Rodrigo	2021
"Happier Than Ever"	Billie Eilish	2021
"Human"	Sevdaliza	2016
"I'm Outta Love"	Anastacia	2000
"Jerusalema"	Master KG featuring Nomcebo Zikode	2019
"Jopping"	SuperM	2019
"Judas"	Lady Gaga	2011
"Last Friday Night (T.G.I.F.)"	Katy Perry	2011
"Level Up"	Ciara	2018
"Levitating"	Dua Lipa	2020
"Love Story (Taylor's Version)"	Taylor Swift	2021
"Mood"	24kGoldn featuring Iann Dior	2020
"Mr. Blue Sky"	The Sunlight Shakers (as made famous by Electric Light Orchestra)	1978
"My Way"	Domino Saints	2021
"Nails, Hair, Hips, Heels" (Note: Features the Just Dance version of the song and the original clean radio edit in-game; with Hall appearing as a coach in both routines)	Todrick Hall	2019
"Pop/Stars" (Note: Tie-in to League of Legends, featuring game characters/band members Kai'Sa, Ahri, Akali, and Evelynn as the main coaches.)	K/DA featuring Madison Beer, (G)I-dle and Jaira Burns	2018
"Poster Girl"	Zara Larsson	2021
"Rock Your Body"	Justin Timberlake	2003
"Run the World (Girls)"	Beyoncé	2011
"Save Your Tears (Remix)"	The Weeknd and Ariana Grande	2021
"Smalltown Boy"	Bronski Beat	1984
"Stop Drop Roll"	Ayo & Teo	2021
"Sua Cara"	Major Lazer featuring Anitta and Pabllo Vittar	2017
"Think About Things"	Daði Freyr	2020
"You Can Dance"	Chilly Gonzales	2010
"You Make Me Feel (Mighty Real)"	Sylvester	1978

=== Kids Mode ===
The following songs appear on the Kids Mode of the game, note that the following were previously featured on the Kids Mode of previous Just Dance games:

Song	Artist	Year
"Dance of the Mirlitons" (Note: Previously featured on Just Dance 2021)	The Just Dance Orchestra (as made famous by Pyotr Ilyich Tchaikovsky)	1892
"Fearless Pirate" (Note: Previously featured on Just Dance 2018)	Marine Band (as made famous by The Yetties)	2003
"Funky Robot"	Dancing Bros. (as made famous by Tom Haines & Christopher Branch)	2006
"Get on the Fire Truck"	The Step Brigade (as made famous by Terry Devine-King)	2020
"Jungle Dances" (Note: Previously featured on Just Dance 2020)	The Sunlight Shakers	2019
"Kitchen Kittens"	Cooking Meow Meow	2019
"Monsters of Jazz" (Note: Previously featured on Just Dance 2019)	Groove Century (as made famous by Jacky Arthur & Harold Geller)	2015
"My Friend the Dragon"	The Just Dance Orchestra	2019

=== Just Dance Unlimited ===
Just Dance Unlimited continues to be offered on 2022 for eighth- and ninth-generation consoles and Stadia, featuring a streaming library of new and existing songs.

Songs exclusive to Just Dance Unlimited include:

Song	Artist	Year	Release date
"Koi" (Note: World Tour Event) (Note: Also available as a Japanese and French-exclusive track on the soundtrack)	Gen Hoshino	2016	November 4, 2021 (Japan and France); January 13, 2022 (Worldwide)
"Shoutout" (Note: Also available as a German-exclusive track on the soundtrack)	Lisa Pac	2021	November 4, 2021 (Germany); January 13, 2022 (Worldwide)
"À la Folie" (Note: Also available as a French-exclusive track on the soundtrack)	Julien Granel and Léna Situations	2021	November 4, 2021 (France); January 20, 2022 (Worldwide)
"Waterval" (Note: Also available as a Benelux region-exclusive track on the soundtrack)	K3	2021	December 9, 2021 (Benelux region); January 27, 2022 (Worldwide)
"Princess" (Note: Also available as a Southeast Asian, Hong Kong, and Taiwanese-exclusive track on the soundtrack) (Note: Also appeared in the Chinese version of Just Dance 2020)	Jam Hsiao	2009	November 18, 2021 (Southeast Asia, Hong Kong, Taiwan); February 3, 2022 (Worldwide)
"Positions" (Note: Initially free to be played until March 3, 2022, then became exclusive after the said date) (Note: Season 1: Astral)	Ariana Grande	2020	February 17, 2022 (Initial release); March 3, 2022 (JDU exclusive)
"Montero (Call Me by Your Name)"	Lil Nas X	2021	March 17, 2022
"Kiss Me More"	Doja Cat featuring SZA	2021	March 24, 2022
"Follow the White Rabbit" (Note: Originally meant to be in the main tracklist)	Madison Beer	2021	March 31, 2022
"Bad Habits" (Note: Initially free to be played until June 16, 2022, then became exclusive after the said date) (Note: Season 2: Surreal)	Ed Sheeran	2021	June 2, 2022 (Initial release); June 16, 2022 (JDU exclusive)
"Daisy"	Ashnikko	2020	June 30, 2022
"Malibu"	Kim Petras	2020	July 7, 2022
"Break My Heart"	Dua Lipa	2020	July 12, 2022
