= Just Dance 2017 =

2016 video game

- Developers: Ubisoft Paris; Ubisoft Pune
- Publisher: Ubisoft
- Series: Just Dance
- Engine: UbiArt Framework
- Platforms: PlayStation 3; PlayStation 4; Wii; Wii U; Windows; Xbox 360; Xbox One; Nintendo Switch
- Release: PlayStation 3, PlayStation 4, Wii, Wii U, Windows, Xbox 360, Xbox One: NA: October 25, 2016; PAL: October 27, 2016; UK: October 28, 2016; Nintendo Switch: WW: March 3, 2017
- Genre: Rhythm
- Modes: Single-player, multiplayer

Just Dance 2017 is a 2016 dance-based rhythm game developed and published by Ubisoft. It was unveiled on June 13, 2016, during its E3 press conference as the eighth main installment of the series, and was released in October 2016 for PlayStation 3, PlayStation 4, Xbox 360, Xbox One, Wii, Wii U, and Windows; and on March 3, 2017, for Nintendo Switch. The game was the only title of the series to be released on Windows, and was released as a launch title for Nintendo Switch.

== Gameplay ==
As in previous installments, players must mimic the routine of an on-screen dancer to a chosen song, scoring points based on their accuracy. For input, the game supports either the respective motion controller system for a particular console platform (Wii Remotes on Wii and Wii U, PlayStation Move on PlayStation 3 and PlayStation 4, PlayStation Camera on PlayStation 4, Kinect on Xbox 360 and One, and Joy-Con on Nintendo Switch), or a smartphone with the game's companion mobile app. For the PC version, a gamepad and a keyboard can also be used for menu navigation. The Chinese version of the game removes online features, such as Just Dance Unlimited and the World Dance Floor.

The "Dance Party" mode has been renamed to the "Just Dance" mode, players can now have the ability to search for a song using the menu. The "Superstar" rank has been added, in which it's achievable at 11,000 points. A new "Just Dance Machine" mode was added on current-generation console and PC versions, in which players must dance through routines of different styles to help recharge an alien spaceship, using a unique scoring mechanic which shows green if successfully or red if messing up. Each session contains five routines, with "Cosmic Rounds" popping up randomly. The story of this mode follows two aliens that are dancing on their ship. All of a sudden, their battery is running low. To recharge its battery, the aliens travelled to Earth and abduct human dancers known as "coaches" to recharge its battery by dancing. In the ending, the battery was charged and the aliens leave Earth as they keep dancing. But unfortunately, their battery is running low once again.

The game modes include Dance Quests, Sweat (workout and playlist modes), Just Dance TV, World Dance Floor, Beat the Boss, Spotlight Players, Happy Hours, and Tournaments.

In Beat the Boss, players would need to get a target amount of stars across one to three song(s) to defeat the boss. In Spotlight Players, players would try to beat a player from the "World Video Challenge" mode to earn a share of the pot of Mojo coins. Happy Hours now appear daily instead of weekly, and feature songs from the Just Dance Unlimited service. In Tournaments, players compete with each other for the top combined score across three songs in daily tournaments and eight songs in weekly tournaments.

World Dance Floor mode has been revamped in the Wii U, Switch, PS4, and Xbox One versions of the game, with new features, such as cross-platform between all versions of the game besides PC. Since the Wii, PS3, and Xbox 360 versions are based on Just Dance 2015, all of the features from the game are retained, with the "Community Remix" feature now in a full screen format as akin to the Wii U, Switch, PS4, Xbox One, and PC versions, as well as the Just Dance Unlimited subscription service for versions of the game on current-generation consoles and PC, with additional content and playlist features. The game's companion app was also updated to become "a hub for players' activities", with photo editing features and Just Dance TV content alongside the app's main purpose as a motion controller. The Wii U exclusive "Party Master" mode was removed. Furthermore, the Wii U version does not have the ability to apply effects for "Autodance" videos, just like in previous entries.

All online services of the game were discontinued for the Wii, PS3, and Xbox 360 versions on November 19, 2018, followed by all other platforms on July 3, 2023.

== Soundtrack ==
The following songs appear on Just Dance 2017:

Song	Artist	Year
"All About Us"	Jordan Fisher	2016
"Bailar"	Deorro featuring Elvis Crespo	2016
"Bang"	Anitta	2015
"Bonbon"	Era Istrefi	2015
"Cake by the Ocean"	DNCE	2015
"Can't Feel My Face"	The Weeknd	2015
"Carnaval Boom"	Latino Sunset	2016
"Cheap Thrills"	Sia featuring Sean Paul	2016
"Chiwawa" (Note: Previously appeared in Just Dance 2016; only available on the Nintendo Switch and Nintendo Wii versions of the game.)	Wanko Ni Mero Mero	2015
"Cola Song"	Inna featuring J Balvin	2014
"Daddy" (Note: Not available in the Chinese version of the game.)	Psy featuring CL of 2NE1	2015
"Don't Stop Me Now"	Queen	1979
"Don't Wanna Know"	Maroon 5	2016
"Dragostea Din Tei"	O-Zone	2003
"El Tiki"	Maluma	2015
"Ghost In the Keys"	Halloween Thrills	2016
"Groove"	Jack & Jack	2014
"Hips Don't Lie"	Shakira featuring Wyclef Jean	2006
"I Love Rock 'n Roll"	Fast Forward Highway (as made famous by Joan Jett & the Blackhearts)	1982
"Karaoke Forever - Future Underworld Mix" (Note: Also known as "Qia La Yong Yuan OK - Future Underworld Mix") (Note: Only available in the Chinese version of the game.)	Alan Tam	1990
"Into You"	Ariana Grande	2016
"La Bicicleta"	Carlos Vives and Shakira	2016
"Last Christmas" (Note: Exclusive to Just Dance Unlimited on the Nintendo Switch version of the game.)	Santa Clones (as made famous by Wham!)	1984
"Lean On"	Major Lazer featuring MØ and DJ Snake	2015
"Leg Song" (Note: Also known as "Tui Zhi Ge".)	Lulu	2016
"Leila"	Cheb Salama	2016
"Like I Would"	Zayn	2016
"Little Swing"	AronChupa featuring Little Sis Nora	2016
"Oishii Oishii"	Wanko Ni Mero Mero	2016
"PoPiPo"	Hatsune Miku (Note: Composed by LamazeP.)	2007
"RADICAL"	Dyro and Dannic	2014
"Run The Night" (Note: Added to the Chinese version of the game via an update patch.)	Gigi Rowe	2016
"Scream & Shout"	will.i.am featuring Britney Spears	2012
"September"	Equinox Stars (as made famous by Earth, Wind & Fire)	1978
"Single Ladies (Put a Ring on It)"	Beyoncé	2008
"Sorry" (Note: Also available on the old/Wii U demo version of the game.)	Justin Bieber	2015
"Te Dominar"	Daya Luz	2016
"Tico-Tico no Fubá"	The Frankie Bostello Orchestra (as made famous by Zequinha de Abreu)	1917
"Titanium"	David Guetta featuring Sia	2011
"Watch Me (Whip/Nae Nae)" (Note: Also available on the demo version of the game.)	Silentó	2015
"What Is Love"	Ultraclub 90 (as made famous by Haddaway)	1993
"Wherever I Go"	OneRepublic	2016
"William Tell Overture" (Note: Previously appeared in Just Dance 2016; available on the Nintendo Switch version of the game and as an unlockable song via Ubisoft Connect on other platforms, except for the Wii version.)	Rossini	1829
"Worth It"	Fifth Harmony featuring Kid Ink	2015

Note: "In the Hall of the Pixel King" by Dancing Bros. (based on "In the Hall of the Mountain King", written by Edvard Grieg, and "Ode to Joy", written by Ludwig van Beethoven) and "Itsy Bitsy Teenie Weenie Yellow Polkadot Bikini" by Brian Hyland (covered by The Sunlight Shakers) were planned to appear in the game, but they were scrapped for unknown reasons. They were later brought back to Just Dance 2018.

=== Just Dance Unlimited ===
Just Dance Unlimited is a subscription-based service for accessing a streaming library of songs from previous Just Dance games, and new songs that are exclusive to the service. A three-month subscription to Just Dance Unlimited was included as part of a higher-priced version of the game, also known as the "Gold Edition". The PAL version of the game included three months of Just Dance Unlimited, just like the Gold Edition. All exclusive tracks were also playable on the Unlimited mode of 2016. The 2017 game supported Just Dance Unlimited on eighth-generation consoles, on PC, and on Nintendo Switch until July 3, 2023. This feature is not available in the Chinese version of the game.

Songs exclusive to Just Dance Unlimited include:

Song	Artist	Year	Release date
"Let Me Love You" (Note: Used to be free if players connected their Ubisoft Connect account to the game, but has since become a Just Dance Unlimited exclusive.)	DJ Snake featuring Justin Bieber	2016	October 25, 2016
"Youth"	Troye Sivan	2015	October 25, 2016
"Imya 505" (Note: Available free in Russia.)	Vremya i Steklo	2015	October 25, 2016
"Ona Tańczy Dla Mnie" (Note: Available free in Poland.)	Weekend	2012	October 25, 2016
"Je Sais Pas Danser" (Note: Available free in France.)	Natoo	2016	October 25, 2016 (France); February 23, 2017 (Worldwide)
"The Greatest"	Sia	2016	November 25, 2016
"Juju on That Beat (TZ Anthem)"	Zay Hilfigerrr and Zayion McCall	2016	December 21, 2016
"Chiwawa" (Alternate - Barbie Version) (Note: Available free in all supported regions.)	Wanko Ni Mero Mero	2015	January 26, 2017
"Don't Worry"	Madcon featuring Ray Dalton	2015	January 26, 2017
"Me Too"	Meghan Trainor	2016	February 23, 2017
"How Deep Is Your Love" (Note: Available free on the Nintendo Switch version of the game. It's also available as an exclusive song on other platforms.)	Calvin Harris and Disciples	2015	March 3, 2017 (Nintendo Switch); June 22, 2017 (PC, Xbox One, Wii U, PS4)
"HandClap"	Fitz and the Tantrums	2016	March 23, 2017 (Classic); August 30, 2017 (Alternate)
"Don't Let Me Down"	The Chainsmokers featuring Daya	2016	April 20, 2017
"Ain't My Fault"	Zara Larsson	2016	May 30, 2017
"Wake Me Up Before You Go-Go" (Alternate)	Wham!	1984	July 20, 2017

Note: The Alternate routines available via Just Dance Unlimited are tie-ins with various franchises, with "Chiwawa" being a tie-in with Barbie for the movie Barbie: Video Game Hero and "Wake Me Up Before You Go-Go" being a tie-in with The Emoji Movie, which features the Just Dance Now app in a scene.

== Reception ==
Steve Hannley of Hardcore Gamer thought that although Ubisoft had defied his prediction that Just Dance Unlimited would be the future of the franchise instead of physical releases, they had put a larger effort into the on-disc content of 2017 than 2016 (which he described as being a "last minute afterthought" to introduce Unlimited). The Just Dance Machine mode was considered to be "pointless" due to being a basic concept driven by its presentation, but is "a concept that's never been done before in rhythm games and an example of the innovation the series needs to warrant another physical release". Hannley also praised the higher quality of the game's soundtrack, including more recent hit music, fewer "joke" songs, and surfacing Gigi Rowe's "impressive" debut single "Run the Night". In conclusion, Hannley continued to assert that Ubisoft should focus more on providing more immediate access to recent music rather than requiring players to wait for the next annual physical release, but that Just Dance 2017 was "thankfully a marked improvement over its predecessor."

=== Awards ===
The game won the award for "Favorite Video Game" at the 2017 Kids' Choice Awards, and was nominated for "Best Family/Social Game" at the Titanium Awards.
