= Just Dance 2018 =

2017 video game

- Developers: Ubisoft Paris; Ubisoft Pune; Ubisoft Shanghai
- Publisher: Ubisoft
- Series: Just Dance
- Engine: UbiArt Framework
- Platforms: Wii; Wii U Nintendo Switch; PlayStation 3 PlayStation 4 Xbox 360; Xbox One
- Release: NA: October 24, 2017; PAL: October 26, 2017
- Genre: Rhythm
- Mode: Multiplayer

Just Dance 2018 is a 2017 dance rhythm game developed and published by Ubisoft. It was unveiled on June 12, 2017, during its E3 press conference as the ninth main installment of the series, and was released in October 2017 for PlayStation 3, PlayStation 4, Xbox 360, Xbox One, Wii, Wii U, and Nintendo Switch. This was the last Just Dance game to be released on the PlayStation 3 console, and by extension, the final PlayStation 3 video game to be published by Ubisoft.

== Gameplay ==
As with the previous installments of the franchise, players must mimic the on-screen dancer's choreography to a chosen song using either motion controllers (Wii Remotes on Wii and Wii U, PlayStation Move on PlayStation 3 and PlayStation 4, PlayStation Camera on PlayStation 4, Kinect on Xbox 360 and One, and Joy-Con on Nintendo Switch) or the game's associated Just Dance Controller app on a smartphone.

While the Wii, PS3, and Xbox 360 versions of the game are based on Just Dance 2015, the current-generation console versions feature an updated user interface, which removed other additional modes except for the "World Dance Floor" to more focus on standard gameplay. In the "Just Dance" mode menu, players can activate Sweat by pressing a certain button on the controller. A new "Super" judgment was added between "Good" and "Perfect", as well as a "Megastar" rank, achievable at 12,000 points. The new "Dance Lab" mode, serving as a spiritual successor to the "Just Dance Machine" mode in Just Dance 2017, using the same scoring mechanic from that said mode, now with the addition of the traditional star ranking system, features medleys of choreography representing different professions and animals, while a new "Kids Mode" was designed to provide a gameplay experience and choreography tailored towards younger players, featuring a revamped scoring mechanic based on the traditional mechanic, with rainbow stars as the max rank, as akin to the "Superstar" rank in the main "Just Dance" mode, in which can also be played in that said mode with the traditional gameplay via searching.

The "World Dance Floor" mode has a revamped Team Battle feature, which players are randomly assigned to either the Red Team or the Blue Team, as well as seasonal rankings.

A new feature, "Gift Machine", based on the Crank-a-Kai feature in Yo-kai Watch Dance: Just Dance Special Version, was added. Using 100 Mojo points will allow the ability to unlock avatars, stickers, skins, alternate routines, "Dance Lab" episodes, and additional Mojo points.

The Nintendo Switch version of the game features an exclusive "Double Rumble" mode, which uses features routines based on different professions that leverage the "HD Rumble" functionality in the console's Joy-Con controllers to provide feedback. "Double Rumble" routines require two Joy-Con controllers to play. Furthermore, the "Beat Vibrations" option was also added to the Switch version, which allows Joy-Con controllers vibrate to the beat.

The Ubisoft Connect feature was removed in the PS3, and Xbox 360 versions of the game. Furthermore, the Community Remix and Mashup features were also removed.

All online services of the game for the Wii, PS3, and Xbox 360 versions were discontinued on November 19, 2018, followed by all other platforms on July 3, 2023.

== Soundtrack ==
The following songs appear on Just Dance 2018:

| Song | Artist | Year |
|---|---|---|
| "24K Magic" (Note: Also available on the demo version of the game.) | Bruno Mars | 2016 |
| "All You Gotta Do (Is Just Dance)" (Note: A Chinese version of the song, known as "Wu Li Quan Kai", was included in the Chinese version of Just Dance 2020, exclusively on the Nintendo Switch, simply entitled Just Dance.) | The Just Dance Band | 2017 |
| "Another One Bites the Dust" | Queen | 1980 |
| "Automaton" | Jamiroquai | 2017 |
| "Bad Liar" | Selena Gomez | 2017 |
| "Beep Beep I'm a Sheep" | LilDeuceDeuce featuring BlackGryph0n and TomSka | 2017 |
| "Blow Your Mind (Mwah)" | Dua Lipa | 2016 |
| "Blue (Da Ba Dee)" | Hit the Electro Beat (as made famous by Eiffel 65) | 1998 |
| "Boom Boom" | Iggy Azalea featuring Zedd | 2017 |
| "Bubble Pop!" | Hyuna | 2011 |
| "Carmen (Ouverture)" | Just Dance Orchestra (as made famous by Georges Bizet) | 1875 |
| "Chantaje" | Shakira featuring Maluma | 2016 |
| "Daddy Cool" | Groove Century (as made famous by Boney M.) | 1976 |
| "Despacito" | Luis Fonsi featuring Daddy Yankee | 2017 |
| "Dharma" | Headhunterz and Kshmr | 2016 |
| "Diggy" | Spencer Ludwig | 2016 |
| "Fight Club" | Lights | 2017 |
| "Footloose" | Top Culture (as made famous by Kenny Loggins) | 1984 |
| "Got That" | Gigi Rowe | 2017 |
| "How Far I'll Go" | Disney's Moana (as made famous by Auliʻi Cravalho) | 2016 |
| "In the Hall of the Pixel King" (Note: Originally planned to appear on the main tracklist of the previous game: Just Dance 2017, but it was later delayed to find itself placed on Just Dance 2018 instead.) | Dancing Bros. (Note: Based on "In the Hall of the Mountain King", written by Edvard Grieg, and "Ode to Joy", written by Friedrich Schiller.) | 2017 |
| "Instruction" | Jax Jones featuring Demi Lovato and Stefflon Don | 2017 |
| "Itsy Bitsy Teenie Weenie Yellow Polkadot Bikini" | The Sunlight Shakers (as made famous by Brian Hyland) | 1960 |
| "John Wayne" | Lady Gaga | 2017 |
| "Keep On Moving" | Michelle Delamor | 2017 |
| "Kissing Strangers" | DNCE featuring Nicki Minaj | 2017 |
| "Love Ward" | Hatsune Miku (Note: Composed by Oster Project) | 2009 |
| "Make It Jingle" | Big Freedia | 2016 |
| "Naughty Girl" | Beyoncé | 2004 |
| "New Face" | Psy | 2017 |
| "Risky Business" | Jorge Blanco | 2017 |
| "Rockabye" | Clean Bandit featuring Sean Paul and Anne-Marie | 2016 |
| "Sayonara" | Wanko Ni Mero Mero | 2017 |
| "Shape of You" | Ed Sheeran | 2017 |
| "Side to Side" | Ariana Grande featuring Nicki Minaj | 2016 |
| "Slumber Party" | Britney Spears featuring Tinashe | 2016 |
| "Sugar Dance" (Note: Exclusive to 8th-generation consoles and only unlocked with the game code "DANCE") | The Just Dance Band | 2017 |
| "Swish Swish" | Katy Perry featuring Nicki Minaj | 2017 |
| "The Way I Are (Dance with Somebody)" | Bebe Rexha featuring Lil Wayne | 2017 |
| "Tumbum" | Yemi Alade | 2016 |
| "Waka Waka (This Time for Africa)" | Shakira | 2010 |

=== Kids Mode ===
The following songs appear on the Kids Mode of the game:

| Song | Artist | Year |
|---|---|---|
| "Amazing Girl" | The Girly Team | 2017 |
| "Beep Beep I'm a Sheep" | LilDeuceDeuce featuring BlackGryph0n and TomSka | 2017 |
| "Blue (Da Ba Dee)" | Hit the Electro Beat (as made famous by Eiffel 65) | 1999 |
| "Daddy Cool" | Groove Century (as made famous by Boney M.) | 1976 |
| "Fearless Pirate" | Marine Band (as made famous by The Yetties) | 2003 |
| "Footloose" (Note: A Kids Version is available, with the song being abridged.) | Top Culture (as made famous by Kenny Loggins) | 1984 |
| "Funky Robot" | Dancing Bros. | 2017 |
| "Happy Farm" | Groove Century | 2017 |
| "How Far I'll Go" | Disney's Moana (as made famous by Auliʻi Cravalho) | 2016 |
| "Magic Halloween" | Halloween Thrills | 2017 |
| "Pixie Land" | The Sunlight Shakers | 2017 |
| "Waka Waka (This Time for Africa)" | Shakira | 2010 |

Note: These songs also can be played on 7th-gen consoles (Wii, Xbox 360 and PlayStation 3).

=== Just Dance Unlimited ===
Just Dance Unlimited is a subscription-based service for accessing a streaming library of songs from previous Just Dance games, and new songs that are exclusive to the service. A three-month subscription to Just Dance Unlimited was included as part of the game. All exclusive tracks (except tracks restricted to only 2018) were also playable on 2016 and 2017's Unlimited service. The 2018 game supported Just Dance Unlimited on PlayStation 4, Xbox One, Wii U, and Nintendo Switch until July 3, 2023.

Songs exclusive to Just Dance Unlimited include:

| Song | Artist | Year | Release date |
|---|---|---|---|
| "Thumbs" (Note: Used to be free if players connected their Ubisoft Connect account to the game (only for PlayStation 4, Xbox One and Wii U and Nintendo Switch), but has since become a Just Dance Unlimited exclusive.) | Sabrina Carpenter | 2016 | October 24, 2017 |
| "Just Mario" (Note: Only available on the Nintendo Switch version of Just Dance Unlimited) (Note: Remake of the Japanese Just Dance Wii unlockable and NTSC/PAL Just Dance 3 DLC for Wii, which differs from its design of its debut) | Ubisoft Meets Nintendo (as made famous by Koji Kondo) | 1985 | October 24, 2017 |
| "Sun" (Note: Available for free in Russia) | Demo | 1999 | October 26, 2017 |
| "J'suis Pas Jalouse" (Note: Available for free in France) | Andy | 2017 | October 26, 2017 |
| "Error" (Note: Available for free in Poland) | Natalia Nykiel | 2016 | November 23, 2017 |
| "Feel It Still" | Portugal. The Man | 2017 | January 25, 2018 |
| "Mi Gente" | J Balvin and Willy William | 2017 | February 22, 2018 |
| "Naughty Girl" (Alternate inspired by Mario + Rabbids Kingdom Battle) (Note: Tie-in to Mario + Rabbids Kingdom Battle where it features Rabbid Peach as the main coach) | Beyoncé | 2004 | March 12, 2018 |
| "Sax" (Note: Originally meant to be in the main tracklist.) | Fleur East | 2015 | April 19, 2018 |
| "What Lovers Do" | Maroon 5 featuring SZA | 2017 | June 21, 2018 |
| "Dame Tu Cosita" (Note: Originally meant to be in the main tracklist of Just Dance 2019, but was pushed forward to Unlimited in Just Dance 2018.) | El Chombo featuring Cutty Ranks | 2018 | July 26, 2018 |
| "Dancing Queen" (Note: Originally planned for Just Dance 2015, but was scrapped for unknown reasons.) | ABBA | 1976 | August 24, 2018 |
| "No Lie" | Sean Paul featuring Dua Lipa | 2016 | September 20, 2018 |

== Reception ==
=== Accolades ===
The game was nominated for "Best Family/Social Game" at the 2017 Game Critics Awards. In Game Informer's Reader's Choice Best of 2017 Awards, it took the lead for "Best Music/Rhythm Game". It was also nominated for "Family Game of the Year" at the 21st Annual D.I.C.E. Awards, and for "Family Game" at the 14th British Academy Games Awards. It won the award for "Favorite Video Game" at Nickelodeon's 2018 Kids' Choice Awards, and was nominated for "Fan-Favorite Multiplayer Game" at the Gamers' Choice Awards.
