= Just Dance 2014 =

2013 video game

- Developers: Ubisoft Paris; Ubisoft Reflections; Ubisoft Montpellier; Ubisoft Bucharest; Ubisoft Milan; Ubisoft Pune
- Publisher: Ubisoft
- Series: Just Dance
- Engine: UbiArt Framework
- Platforms: PlayStation 3, Wii, Wii U, Xbox 360, PlayStation 4, Xbox One
- Release: Xbox 360, PlayStation 3, Wii, Wii U: PAL: 1 October 2013; UK: 4 October 2013; NA: 8 October 2013; PlayStation 4: NA: 15 November 2013; PAL: 29 November 2013; Xbox One: WW: 22 November 2013
- Genres: Music, rhythm
- Modes: Single-player, multiplayer

Just Dance 2014 is a 2013 dance rhythm game developed and published by Ubisoft. The fifth main installment of the Just Dance series, it was announced at Ubisoft's E3 2013 press event, and released for PlayStation 3, Xbox 360, Wii, and Wii U on 9 October 2013, and for PlayStation 4 and Xbox One as a launch title on 15 November and 22 November 2013 respectively.

The game introduced several new features to the franchise, including expanded second screen support for Wii U and Xbox platforms, the ability to record and share video clips of gameplay on supported platforms, and online multiplayer through the "World Dance Floor" mode.

== Gameplay ==
As in previous installments, players must mimic the routine of an on-screen dancer to a chosen song, scoring points based on their accuracy. The game requires motion controllers to dance (Wii Remotes on Wii and Wii U, PlayStation Move on PlayStation 3, a choice of either PlayStation Move or PlayStation Camera on PlayStation 4, and Kinect on Xbox 360 and Xbox One).

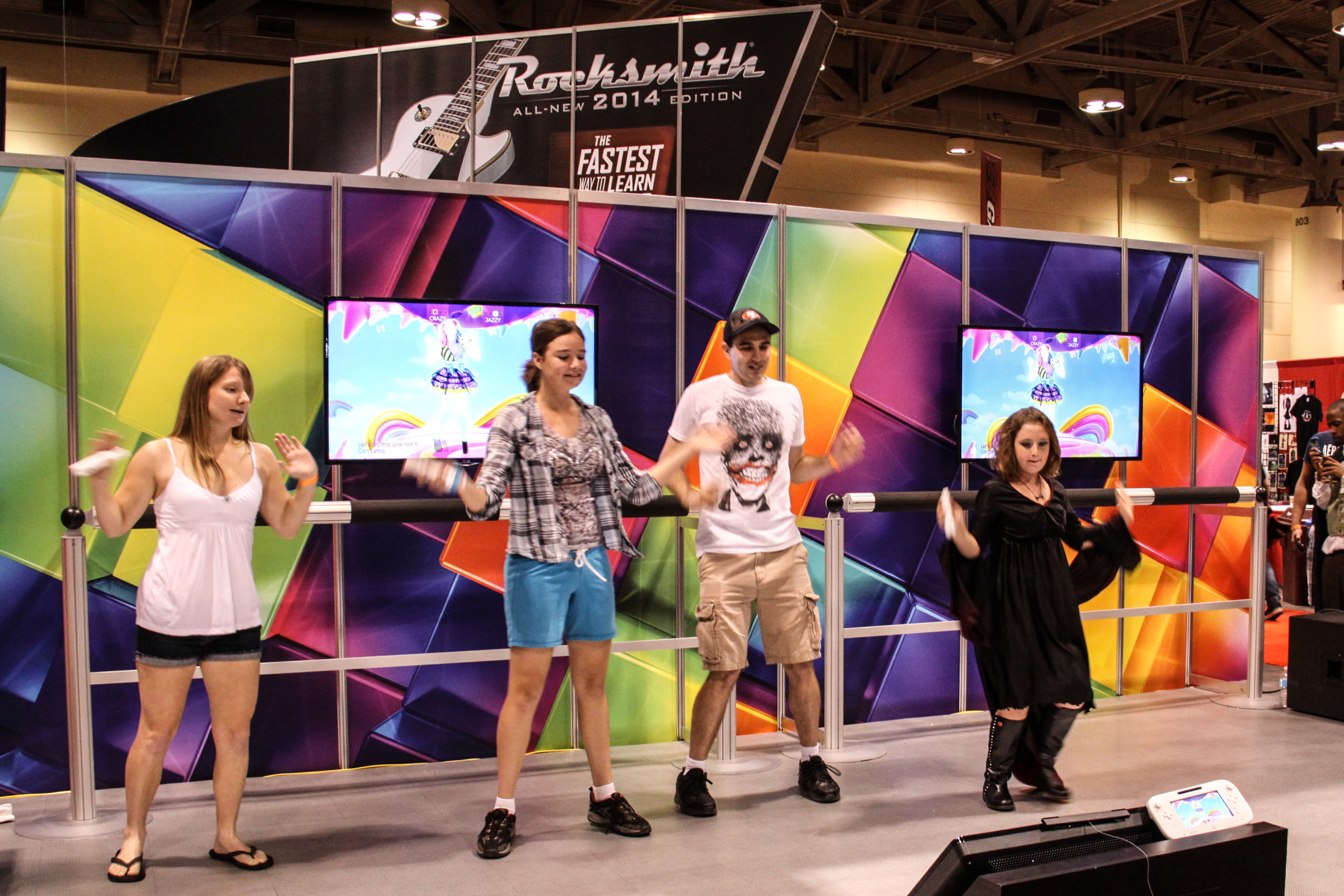
Just Dance at Fan Expo 2014

Selected songs now feature "On Stage" modes—routines in which one player dances in a lead role while others perform as backup dancers. Lyrics are displayed above the dancers in this mode instead of the bottom left, in order to focus on singing along. The Xbox One version also include an alternate routine for "Kiss You" (serving as a classic routine in that said version instead of the original four player routine, which has been the classic routine on other consoles, in which is now the alternate routine in that said version) that can be played by up to six players at once. However, Dance Crew routines are four players only in that said version. The "AutoDance" is feature allows users to record footage of their gameplay, which can then be uploaded to the Just Dance website or shared on social networks. The "Karaoke" feature allows players to use connected microphones to sing along to all of the lyrics on-screen. Players also earn bonus "Mojo" points for singing along. "Gold Moves" in Mashups have made its return after its absence from the previous game, Just Dance 4.

Online multiplayer was added by means of a ghost data system, as well a new mode known as "World Dance Floor"—in which players compete against others simultaneously on the same song in a massively multiplayer setting. Players can join in at any time with 8 player parties, except for the Wii version, compare their performance against other players during and after each song, and increase their level by playing more often. Occasionally, players can vote to decide on the next song.

Additional second screen features are available on the Wii U, Xbox One and Xbox 360 (via an update) versions of the game using a Wii U GamePad or Xbox SmartGlass, respectively; users can manage playlists, even when the current song is in progress (Xbox One and Xbox 360 versions only), and manipulate gameplay and routines in the "Party Master" mode, which is a revamped version of the "Puppet Master" mode from Just Dance 4, with dance moves no longer tied to all entries of the Just Dance series, and are free to choose any of the four randomized dance moves, as well as the ability to switch songs at certain times. The GamePad's camera can also be used to record AutoDance footage (but effects can't be applied in that version) and serve as a microphone for karaoke, which also has the option to display lyrics on the Gamepad, just like in Just Dance 4.

All online services for the game were discontinued on 19 November 2018.

== Soundtrack ==
There are a total of 50 songs in the main soundtrack.

Song	Artist	Year
"#thatPOWER"	will.i.am featuring Justin Bieber	2013
"99 Luftballons"	Rutschen Planeten (as made famous by Nena)	1983
"Alfonso Signorini (Eroe Nazionale)" (Note: PAL regions only.)	Fedez	2013
"Applause"	Lady Gaga	2013
"Aquarius/Let the Sunshine In"	The Sunlight Shakers (as made famous by The 5th Dimension)	1969
"Blame It on the Boogie"	Mick Jackson (as made famous by The Jacksons)	1978
"Blurred Lines"	Robin Thicke featuring Pharrell Williams	2013
"C'mon"	Ke$ha	2012
"Candy"	Robbie Williams	2012
"Careless Whisper"	George Michael	1984
"Could You Be Loved"	Bob Marley	1980
"Dançando" (Note: NTSC regions only. Available as DLC for PAL regions.)	Ivete Sangalo	2013
"Danse (Pop Version)"	Tal	2013
"Feel So Right"	Imposs featuring Konshens	2013
"Feel This Moment"	Pitbull featuring Christina Aguilera	2013
"Fine China"	Chris Brown	2013
"Flashdance... What a Feeling"	The Girly Team (as made famous by Irene Cara)	1983
"Follow the Leader"	Wisin & Yandel featuring Jennifer Lopez	2012
"Gentleman"	Psy	2013
"Get Lucky"	Daft Punk featuring Pharrell Williams	2013
"Ghostbusters"	Ray Parker Jr.	1984
"Gimme! Gimme! Gimme! (A Man After Midnight)"	ABBA	1979
"I Kissed a Girl"	Katy Perry	2008
"I Will Survive"	Gloria Gaynor	1978
"In the Summertime"	Mungo Jerry	1970
"Isidora"	Bog Bog Orkestar	1952
"It's You"	Duck Sauce	2013
"Just a Gigolo"	Louis Prima	1956
"Just Dance"	Lady Gaga featuring Colby O'Donis	2008
"Kiss You"	One Direction	2013
"Limbo"	Daddy Yankee	2012
"Love Boat"	Frankie Bostello (as made famous by Jack Jones)	1977
"María"	Ricky Martin	1995
"Miss Understood"	Sammie	2013
"Moskau"	Dancing Bros. (as made famous by Dschinghis Khan)	1979
"Nitro Bot" (Note: "Robot Rock" by Daft Punk was supposed to be on the main tracklist, but was instead replaced with "Nitro Bot" by Sentai Express.)	Sentai Express	2013
"Pound the Alarm"	Nicki Minaj	2012
"Prince Ali"	Disney's Aladdin (as made famous by Robin Williams)	1992
"Rich Girl"	Gwen Stefani featuring Eve	2004
"Safe and Sound" (Note: Requires unlock code obtained through sponsored promotion with Garnier)	Capital Cities	2011
"She Wolf (Falling to Pieces)"	David Guetta featuring Sia	2012
"Starships"	Nicki Minaj	2012
"The Other Side"	Jason Derulo	2013
"The Way"	Ariana Grande featuring Mac Miller	2013
"Troublemaker"	Olly Murs featuring Flo Rida	2012
"Turn Up the Love"	Far East Movement featuring Cover Drive	2012
"Waking Up in Vegas" (Note: Requires unlock code obtained through sponsored promotion with Popchips, also available as DLC)	Katy Perry	2008
"Where Have You Been"	Rihanna	2011
"Wild"	Jessie J featuring Big Sean	2013
"Y.M.C.A"	Village People	1978

=== Downloadable content ===
Additional songs and routines for Just Dance 2014 were released as downloadable content. Some DLC songs were re-issues of songs released as DLC for previous editions.

The game offers downloadable content songs for the player to download. One of them is free of charge.

All of the DLC songs are no longer available for the Wii since the Wii Shop Channel's closure on 30 January 2019. The DLC songs remained available on the Wii U's Nintendo eShop until its closure on 27 March 2023. The DLC songs for the Xbox 360 are no longer available due to the closure of the Xbox Live Marketplace on 27 July 2024.

As of 2027 you will no longer be able to download DLC on PS3 due to the shutdown of the PlayStation Store.

(PAL): These DLC are exclusive to PAL regions of the game.

Song	Artist	Year	Release date
"Roar" (Note: Free to download.)	Katy Perry	2013	1 October 2013
"Pound the Alarm" ("Extreme" alternate routine)	Nicki Minaj	2012	1 October 2013
"Can't Hold Us"	Macklemore & Ryan Lewis featuring Ray Dalton	2011	1 October 2013
"Wake Me Up" (Note: No longer available for download on Xbox One.)	Avicii featuring Aloe Blacc	2013	1 October 2013
"What About Love"	Austin Mahone	2013	26 November 2013
"American Girl"	Bonnie McKee	2013	26 November 2013
"One Way or Another (Teenage Kicks)"	One Direction	2013	26 November 2013
"Sexy and I Know It" (Note: This song was planned to be featured on the main track list of Just Dance 4, but was scrapped for unknown reasons.)	LMFAO	2011	26 November 2013
"Blurred Lines" ("Extreme" alternate routine)	Robin Thicke featuring Pharrell Williams	2013	26 November 2013
"The Other Side" (Note: On the main tracklist of the NTSC version, but a DLC for PAL.) (PAL)	Jason Derulo	2013	26 November 2013
"We Can't Stop" (Note: This song was meant to be a released DLC for Just Dance 2014, but was ultimately removed and delayed for an unknown reason, despite the fact it was ultimately released by accident. Following the accidental release, it was removed from all online shops and made its return to Just Dance 2015 instead, which would therefore be remade.)	Miley Cyrus	2013	26 November 2013
"Dançando" (PAL)	Ivete Sangalo	2013	17 December 2013
"Don't You Worry Child"	Swedish House Mafia featuring John Martin	2012	17 December 2013
"I Need Your Love"	Calvin Harris featuring Ellie Goulding	2013	17 December 2013
"Can't Get Enough"	Becky G featuring Pitbull	2013	17 December 2013
"My Main Girl"	MainStreet	2013	17 December 2013
"Gangnam Style"	Psy	2012	17 December 2013 (4 re-release)
"Applause" ("Official Choreography" ("On Stage") alternate routine)	Lady Gaga	2013	17 December 2013
"#thatPOWER" ("On Stage" routine)	will.i.am featuring Justin Bieber	2013	17 December 2013
"Timber"	Pitbull featuring Kesha	2013	11 February 2014
"Just Dance" ("Sweat" routine)	Lady Gaga featuring Colby O'Donis	2008	11 February 2014
"Die Young" (Note: The routine for the song has been remade, and differs from the original design from its debut.)	Kesha	2012	11 February 2014 (4 re-release)
"Rock N Roll"	Avril Lavigne	2013	11 February 2014
"Funhouse"	Pink	2009	25 March 2014 (4 re-release)
"Part of Me"	Katy Perry	2012	25 March 2014 (4 re-release)
"Moves Like Jagger"	Maroon 5 featuring Christina Aguilera	2011	22 April 2014 (4 re-release)
"Beauty and a Beat"	Justin Bieber featuring Nicki Minaj	2012	22 April 2014 (4 re-release)
"We R Who We R"	Kesha	2010	22 April 2014 (4 re-release)
"One Thing"	One Direction	2012	22 April 2014 (4 re-release)
"Waking Up in Vegas" (Note: Originally available as a Popchips promotional song, not available in Europe, but available as DLC.)	Katy Perry	2009	22 April 2014
"The World is Ours" (Note: Coca-Cola promotional song, not available in the United States and Canada.)	David Correy featuring Monobloco	2014	6 May 2014

== Reception ==
IGN praised Just Dance 2014's continued focus on being a casual party game in comparison to the more sophisticated nature of Dance Central, acknowledging its "accessible, silly, and endearingly creative" routines, the "On Stage" routines providing "a stage for particularly ostentatious dancers to shine" that "[brims] with sexual tension, an essential element of any classic party game from Truth or Dare to Twister", and increasing production values over previous installments, but also noting that its soundtrack was skewed more towards recent music. It was also noted that the World Dance Floor mode could help players who cannot decide on a song due to the game's large soundtrack. In conclusion, giving the game a 7.9 out of 10, IGN explained that "Just Dance 2014 exerts no pressure, and demands no skill. It just invites you to have fun with it, whoever you are and whatever music you like. It's wildly silly, creative and colourful, relying on daft, characterful choreography and to evoke a party atmosphere that puts everyone at ease."
