= Just Dance 2021 =

2020 video game

- Developer: Ubisoft Paris
- Publisher: Ubisoft
- Series: Just Dance
- Engine: UbiArt Framework
- Platforms: Nintendo Switch; PlayStation 4; PlayStation 5; Xbox One; Xbox Series X/S; Stadia
- Release: Switch, PS4, Xbox One, Stadia; November 12, 2020; PS5, Xbox X/S; November 24, 2020
- Genre: Music
- Modes: Single-player; multiplayer

Just Dance 2021 is a 2020 dance rhythm game developed and published by Ubisoft. It was unveiled on August 26, 2020 during the Nintendo Direct Mini: Partner Showcase August 2020 web presentation as the twelfth main installment of the series, and was released on November 12, 2020, for Nintendo Switch, PlayStation 4, Xbox One, and Stadia, and on November 24, 2020, for PlayStation 5 and Xbox Series X/S. It is the first game in the series since the initial title not to be announced at E3, due to the event's cancellation in 2020 as a result of the COVID-19 pandemic. It is also the first game in the main series not to be released for the Wii and the first game in the series not to be available on a Nintendo optical disc.

== Gameplay ==
As with the previous installments of the franchise, players must mimic the on-screen dancer's choreography to a chosen song using either motion controllers (PlayStation Move and PlayStation Camera on PlayStation 4, Kinect on Xbox One, and Joy-Con on Nintendo Switch) or the game's associated smartphone app. The Stadia version also allows the use of a gamepad and a keyboard for menu navigation.

Its user interface and features are largely identical to Just Dance 2019 and Just Dance 2020. Changes include the "World Dance Floor" now being revamped with a three-song competitive tournament in three separate rooms that matches a player's level with other players of a similar level, Chill Panda (Beginner), Fabulous Hippo (Intermediate), and Fierce Deer (Expert), and a new results screen that details the player's accuracy rate in performing the moves, which is only shown when playing solo. The game also features a new mode, known as "Quick Play" mode, in which the game randomly shuffles a song to make it easy for players to jump right into dancing without the struggle of choosing a song to dance to.

== Production ==
The Just Dance series primarily features routines performed by real-life dancers, who have makeup and costumes applied on and their in-game appearances edited in post-production. The production of Just Dance 2021, which occurred during the COVID-19 pandemic, presented several challenges for the development team at Ubisoft Paris owing to social distancing guidelines. To tackle these problems, Ubisoft Paris used strategies like a comprehensive overhaul of traditional production methodologies to accommodate remote collaboration, while upholding the series' established brand strategy. Ubisoft Paris also embraced a commitment to diversity and inclusivity by introducing a variety of characters, including disabled dancers, into the game's universe.

== Reception ==
Reception

Aggregate scores
Aggregator	Score
Metacritic	(NS) 70/100
OpenCritic	52% recommend

The Nintendo Switch version of Just Dance 2021 received "mixed or average" reviews from critics, according to the review aggregation website Metacritic. Fellow review aggregator OpenCritic assessed that the game received fair approval, being recommended by 50% of critics.

== Soundtrack ==
The following songs appear on Just Dance 2021:

Song	Artist	Year
"Adore You"	Harry Styles	2019
"Alexandrie Alexandra"	Jérôme Francis (as made famous by Claude François)	1978
"All the Good Girls Go to Hell"	Billie Eilish	2019
"Bailando"	Paradisio featuring DJ Patrick Samoy	1996
"Blinding Lights"	The Weeknd	2019
"Boy, You Can Keep It"	Alex Newell	2020
"Buscando"	GTA and Jenn Morel	2018
"Dance Monkey"	Tones and I	2019
"Dibby Dibby Sound"	DJ Fresh vs. Jay Fay featuring Ms. Dynamite	2014
"Don't Start Now"	Dua Lipa	2019
"Feel Special"	Twice	2019
"Georgia"	Tiggs Da Author	2015
"Get Get Down"	Paul Johnson	1999
"Heat Seeker"	Dreamers	2020
"Ice Cream"	Blackpink and Selena Gomez	2020
"In the Navy"	The Sunlight Shakers (as made famous by Village People)	1979
"Jooneh Khodet"	Black Cats	2006
"Juice"	Lizzo	2019
"Kick It"	NCT 127	2020
"Kulikitaka"	Toño Rosario	2003
"Lacrimosa"	Apashe	2018
"Magenta Riddim"	DJ Snake	2018
"Paca Dance" (Note: Also available on the demo version of the game)	The Just Dance Band	2020
"Que Tire Pa Lante"	Daddy Yankee	2019
"Rain on Me"	Lady Gaga and Ariana Grande	2020
"Rare"	Selena Gomez	2020
"Runaway (U & I)"	Galantis	2014
"Samba de Janeiro"	Ultraclub 90 (as made famous by Bellini)	1997
"Say So"	Doja Cat	2020
"Señorita"	Shawn Mendes and Camila Cabello	2019
"Temperature"	Sean Paul	2005
"The Other Side"	SZA and Justin Timberlake	2020
"The Weekend"	Michael Gray	2004
"Till the World Ends"	The Girly Team (as made famous by Britney Spears)	2011
"Uno"	Little Big	2020
"Volar"	Lele Pons featuring Susan Díaz and Victor Cardenas	2020
"Without Me"	Eminem	2002
"Yameen Yasar"	DJ Absi	2020
"Yo Le Llego"	J Balvin and Bad Bunny	2019
"You've Got a Friend in Me"	Disney-Pixar's Toy Story (as made famous by Randy Newman)	1995
"Zenit"	Onuka	2019

=== Kids Mode ===
The following songs appear on the Kids Mode of the game:

Song	Artist	Year
"Dance of the Mirlitons"	The Just Dance Orchestra (as made famous by Pyotr Ilyich Tchaikovsky)	1892
"Flying Carpet"	Persian Nights	2020
"Get on the Fire Truck"	The Step Brigade	2020
"Here Comes the Spy"	The Step Brigade	2019
"Kulikitaka"	Toño Rosario	2003
"Let's Save Our Planet"	The Sunlight Shakers	2015
"Rock N Roll Princess"	Fast Forward Highway	2020
"Space Cat"	Equinox Stars	2011
"The Color Lab"	Dancing Bros.	2011
"You've Got a Friend in Me"	Disney Pixar's Toy Story (as made famous by Randy Newman)	1995

=== Just Dance Unlimited ===
Just Dance Unlimited continues to be offered on 2021 for eighth-generation consoles and Stadia, featuring a streaming library of new and existing songs. The service also made its debut on ninth-generation consoles with the release of 2021.

Songs exclusive to Just Dance Unlimited include:

Song	Artist	Year	Release date
"Dans van de Farao" (Note: Also available as a Benelux region exclusive track on the soundtrack)	K3	2020	November 12, 2020 (Benelux region); December 30, 2020 (Worldwide)
"Flash (Just Dance Version)" (Note: Also available as a French-exclusive track on the soundtrack)	Bilal Hassani featuring Sundy Jules, Paola Locatelli and Sulivan Gwed	2020	November 12, 2020 (France); December 30, 2020 (Worldwide)
"U.S.A." (Note: Also available as a Japanese-exclusive track on the soundtrack)	Da Pump	2018	November 12, 2020 (Japan); December 30, 2020 (Worldwide)
"Drum Go Dum" (Note: Initially free to be played until February 25, 2021, then became exclusive after the said date.) (Note: Tie-in to League of Legends, featuring game characters/band members Kai'Sa, Ahri, Akali, and Evelynn as the main coaches.)	K/DA featuring Aluna, Wolftyla and Bekuh Boom	2020	November 25, 2020 (Initial release); February 25, 2021 (JDU exclusive)
"Tusa" (Note: Season 1: Once Upon a Dance)	Karol G and Nicki Minaj	2019	January 14, 2021
"Stupid Love"	Lady Gaga	2020	January 21, 2021
"Girls Like"	Tinie Tempah featuring Zara Larsson	2016	January 28, 2021
"Monster" (Note: Season 2: Versus)	Exo	2016	April 15, 2021
"The Way I Are"	Timbaland featuring Keri Hilson, D.O.E. and Sebastian	2007	April 22, 2021
"Come Back Home"	2NE1	2014	April 29, 2021
"Head & Heart" (Note: Season 3: Festival)	Joel Corry featuring MNEK	2020	July 15, 2021
"Intoxicated"	Martin Solveig and GTA	2015	July 22, 2021
"John Cena"	Sho Madjozi	2019	July 29, 2021
"All the Stars" (Note: Season 4: The Traveler)	Kendrick Lamar and SZA	2018	October 7, 2021
"Rainbow Beats" (Note: Also appeared in the Chinese version of Just Dance 2020, which is also known as "Cai Hong Ji Pai")	Yi Yan, Zhao Fang Jing, Suika Kune and Feizaojun	2020	October 14, 2021
