= Just Dance 2015 =

2014 video game

- Developers: Ubisoft Paris; Ubisoft Reflections; Ubisoft Pune; Ubisoft Milan; Ubisoft Bucharest
- Publisher: Ubisoft
- Series: Just Dance
- Engine: UbiArt Framework
- Platforms: PlayStation 3, Wii, Wii U, Xbox 360, PlayStation 4, Xbox One
- Release: NA: 21 October 2014; PAL: 23 October 2014; CHN: 25 August 2015
- Genre: Rhythm
- Modes: Single-player, multiplayer

Just Dance 2015 is a 2014 dance video game developed and published by Ubisoft. The sixth main installment of the Just Dance series, it was announced at Ubisoft's E3 2014 press event on 9 June 2014 alongside Just Dance Now—a web-based spin-off of the franchise. It was released for PlayStation 3, PlayStation 4, Xbox 360, Xbox One, Wii, and Wii U on 21 October 2014 in North America, 23 October in Europe, 24 October in the UK and 25 October in Asia.

The game introduced additional social networking features to the series, including the ability for players to challenge other players online, and submit clips of themselves playing for inclusion into crowdsourced "Community Remix" routines featured in-game. The game also added the ability for a smartphone to be used as a controller with a companion app.

Just Dance 2015 received mostly positive reviews by critics, praising the franchise's continued focus on casual audience through its forgiving motion detection, multiplayer functionality, and pop-oriented soundtrack, although criticism was directed at the soundtrack for focusing too much on teen pop, as well as its user interface for having confusing and irregular conventions. As of 31 December 2014, the game has sold four million copies worldwide.

== Gameplay ==
As in previous installments, players must mimic the routine of an on-screen dancer to a chosen song, scoring points based on their accuracy. As with the spin-off Just Dance Now, Just Dance 2015 on the PlayStation 4 and Xbox One allows a smartphone to be used as a controller with a companion app, as an alternative to requiring a console's own motion control accessories. Motions are detected through the phone using its internal sensors. The Chinese version features a unique tweak to the traditional karaoke-styled lyrics, in which has a glowing circle that's pulsing to the beat and is next to the highlighted lyrics. Furthermore, online features are removed in the Chinese version, except for the "Challengers" feature, which only allows competing against high scores and AI players.

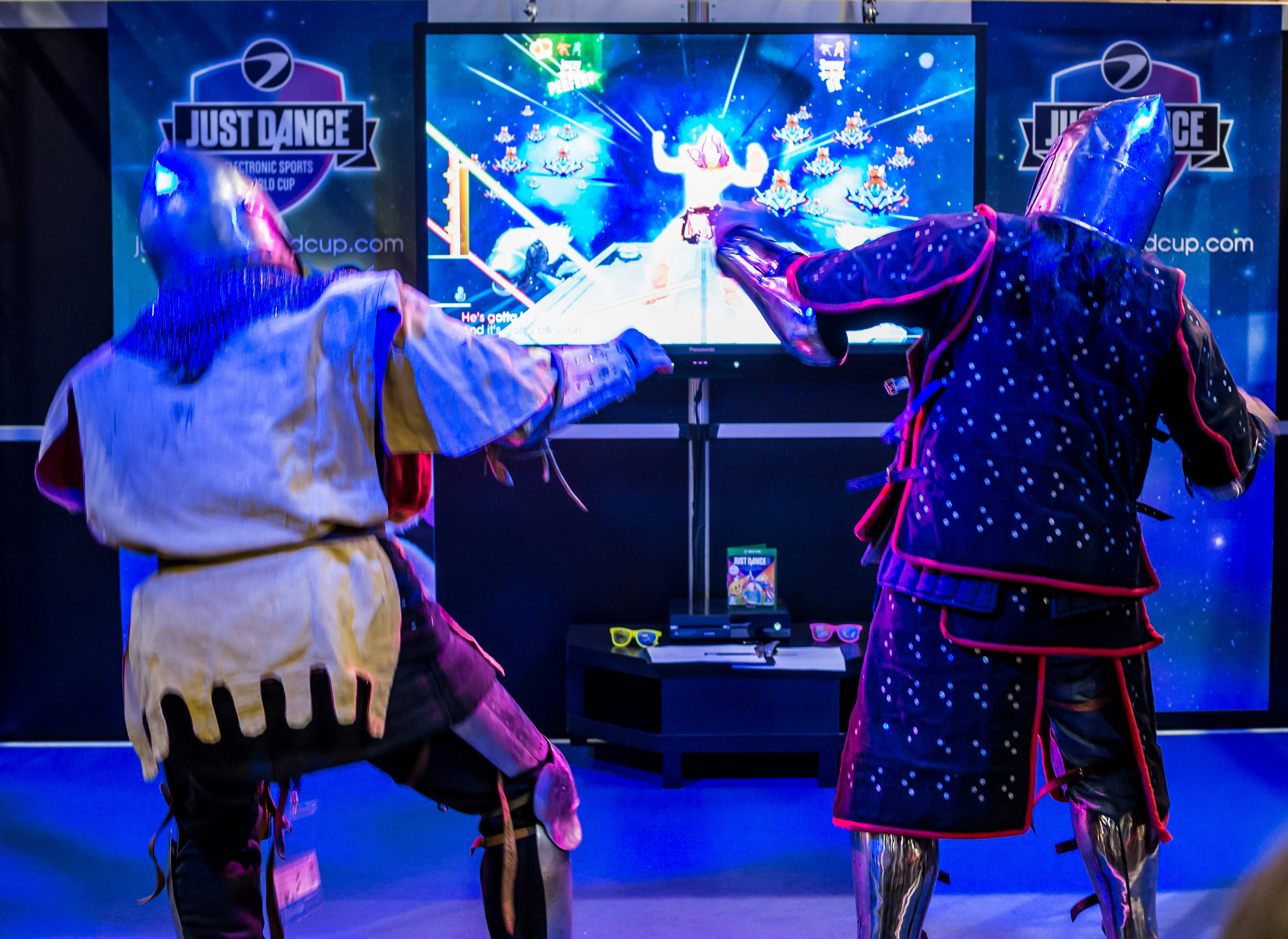
Just Dance 2015 at Gamescom.

A new "challenge" feature allows players to send and receive challenges to and from other players as ghost data. The new "Just Dance Wall" feature allows players to view news and updates, including received challenges. The online "World Dance Floor" mode introduced in Just Dance 2014 returned with new features, including 8 player parties for the Wii version (The Wii U, Xbox 360, Xbox One, PS3, and PS4 versions of Just Dance 2014 only have 8 player parties), and VIPs (which is also available outside of the "World Dance Floor" mode, as the same style as "Community Remixes" in the main game mode, while the Wii version doesn't featured a pre-recorded video in the "World Dance Floor" mode), along with the "AutoDance" video creator (with the effects option not available in the Wii U version, just like in the previous game, Just Dance 2014), while Just Sweat was dropped in favor of an optional k/cal tracker, and the return of the "Non-Stop Shuffle" feature in the playlists menu. Also, difficulty ratings have been removed. Players could also submit clips (excluding players from the Wii version) of their own gameplay for a chance to be incorporated into a "Community Remix"—routines for selected songs that feature a compilation of player videos in place of the rendered dancers. The "Party Master" mode, returning from Just Dance 2014, is now a Wii U exclusive mode, as it is removed from the Xbox One version. Pictures of coaches from the first three main games in the Just Dance series have been remade using its original designs from these games.

All online services for the game were discontinued on 19 November 2018.

== Soundtrack ==
The soundtrack of Just Dance 2015 includes 45 songs spanning across various genres. Geoffroy Sardin, Ubisoft EMEA's senior vice president of marketing, explained that the soundtrack was intended to contain "more top Billboard artists than ever before", citing demand by players.

Notes:

- "Dancing Queen" by ABBA was planned to be featured in the game, but was scrapped for unknown reasons. It was later brought back in Just Dance 2018 as a Just Dance Unlimited exclusive.
- The original version of "You Never Can Tell" by Chuck Berry was meant to appear in the game, but was taken out for an unknown reason. The song was eventually featured in Just Dance 2016 as an "A. Caveman & The Backseats" cover version instead.

Song	Artist	Year
"4x4"	Miley Cyrus	2013
"Addicted to You"	Avicii	2013
"Ain't No Mountain High Enough"	Marvin Gaye and Tammi Terrell	1967
"Bad Romance"	Lady Gaga	2009
"Bailando"	Enrique Iglesias featuring Descemer Bueno and Gente de Zona	2014
"Bang Bang"	Jessie J, Ariana Grande and Nicki Minaj	2014
"Best Song Ever"	One Direction	2013
"Birthday"	Katy Perry	2014
"Black Widow"	Iggy Azalea featuring Rita Ora	2014
"Built for This"	Becky G	2013
"Burn"	Ellie Goulding	2013
"Dancing Diva" (Note: Also known as "Wu Niang") (Note: Only available in Chinese version of the game.)	The Girly Team (Cover By Haoyue Kuang) (as made famous by Jolin Tsai)	2006
"Dark Horse"	Katy Perry	2014
"Diamonds"	Rihanna	2012
"Don't Worry, Be Happy"	The Bench Men (Cover by Steve Ouimette, Cat Gray and Antonio Fernandez)(as made famous by Bobby McFerrin)	1988
"Epic Sirtaki"	The Bouzouki's (as made famous by Zorba the Greek)	1974
"Fatima"	Cheb Salama	2014
"Get Low"	Dillon Francis and DJ Snake	2014
"Happy"	Pharrell Williams	2013
"High Light, High Life" (Note: Also known as "Yu Le Tian Kong") (Note: Only available in Chinese Xbox One version of the game.)	Eason Chan	2013
"Holding Out for a Hero"	Bonnie Tyler	1984
"I Love It"	Icona Pop featuring Charli XCX	2012
"It's My Birthday"	will.i.am and Cody Wise	2014
"Let It Go" (Note: Also known in the Chinese version as "Sui Ti Ba")	Disney's Frozen (Cover by Nicki Gonzalez) (as made famous by Idina Menzel (Note: Hu Wei Na in the Chinese version.))	2013
"Little Apple" (Note: Also known as "Xiao Ping Guo")	Chopstick Brothers	2014
"Love Is All"	The Sunlight Shakers (Cover by Kyle Spicer and the Sweeney Sisters) (as made famous by Roger Glover)	1974
"Love Me Again"	John Newman	2013
"Macarena (Bayside Boys Remix)"	The Girly Team (Cover by Willie Murillo and Becky) (as made famous by Los Del Rio)	1995
"Mahna Mahna"	Frankie Bostello (Cover by Steve Ouimette, Cat Gray, Mischa Ripps Turnock and Jane Child) (as made famous by Piero Umiliani)	1968
"Maps"	Maroon 5	2014
"Me and My Broken Heart"	Rixton	2014
"Movement Is Happiness (Find Your Thing)" (Note: Unlockable in the PAL regions. Available as DLC for NTSC regions, excluding the United States and Canada.)	Avishay Goren and Yossi Cohen	2014
"Never Can Say Goodbye"	Gloria Gaynor	1974
"Nitro Bot" (Note: Previously featured on Just Dance 2014. Ubisoft Connect reward)	Sentai Express	2013
"Only You (and You Alone)"	Love Letter (Cover by Willie Murillo, Lloyd Dwayne, and Jane Child) (as made famous by The Platters)	1955
"Papaoutai" (Note: PAL regions only. Available as DLC for NTSC regions, except for the African Dance (Extreme) version.)	Stromae	2013
"Problem"	Ariana Grande featuring Iggy Azalea and Big Sean	2014
"She Looks So Perfect"	5 Seconds of Summer	2014
"Speedy Gonzalez"	Los Pimientos Locos (Cover by Steve Ouimette, Cat Gray), Nat Moon, Richard Allen , Mischa Ripps Turnock, Jane Child) (as made famous by Pat Boone)	1961
"Summer"	Calvin Harris	2014
"Tetris"	Dancing Bros. (as made famous by Hirokazu Tanaka)	1989
"The Fox (What Does the Fox Say?)"	Ylvis	2013
"Till I Find You" (Note: NTSC regions only. Available as DLC for PAL regions.)	Austin Mahone	2014
"Us Under the Sunshine" (Note: Also known as "Yang Guang Xia De Wo Men")	Wanting Qu	2013
"Walk This Way"	Run-DMC and Aerosmith	1986
"Xmas Tree"	Bollywood Santa	2014
"You Spin Me Round (Like a Record)	Dead or Alive	1984
"You're on My Mind" (Note: The classic routine is a Mashup routine, labeled "Quadro Mashup".)	Imposs featuring J. Perry	2014

=== Downloadable content ===
Additional songs for Just Dance 2015 were released as downloadable content. Some DLC songs were re-issues of songs released as DLC for previous editions.

The game offers downloadable content songs for the player to download. One of them is free of charge.

All of the DLC songs are no longer available for the Wii because of the closure of the Wii Shop Channel. The DLC songs for the Wii U were also discontinued following the Wii U's eShop's closure. Additionally, the DLC songs for the Xbox 360 were discontinued following the closure of the Xbox Live Marketplace.

Song	Artist	Year	Release date
"Break Free" (Note: Free to download.)	Ariana Grande featuring Zedd	2014	21 October 2014
"I Luh Ya Papi"	Jennifer Lopez featuring French Montana	2014	21 October 2014
"Papaoutai" (Note: The African Dance (Extreme) version is not included.)	Stromae	2013	21 October 2014 (NTSC regions)
"Till I Find You"	Austin Mahone	2014	21 October 2014 (PAL regions)
"Movement Is Happiness (Find Your Thing)"	Avishay Goren and Yossi Cohen	2014	21 October 2014 (NTSC regions)
"One Way or Another (Teenage Kicks)"	One Direction	2013	21 October 2014 (2014 re-release)
"Don't You Worry Child"	Swedish House Mafia featuring John Martin	2012	21 October 2014 (2014 re-release)
"Wake Me Up"	Avicii featuring Aloe Blacc	2013	21 October 2014 (2014 re-release)
"Sexy and I Know It"	LMFAO	2011	21 October 2014 (2014 re-release)
"Gangnam Style"	PSY	2012	21 October 2014 (4 re-release)
"Roar"	Katy Perry	2013	21 October 2014 (2014 re-release)
"Die Young" (Note: The original version from Just Dance 4 was used when it was originally launched, but later uses the remade version from Just Dance 2014, due to a mistake.)	Kesha	2012	21 October 2014 (4 re-release)
"Just Dance"	Lady Gaga featuring Colby O'Donis	2008	21 October 2014 (2014 re-release)
"I Need Your Love"	Calvin Harris featuring Ellie Goulding	2013	21 October 2014 (2014 re-release)
"Moves Like Jagger"	Maroon 5 featuring Christina Aguilera	2011	21 October 2014 (4 re-release)
"Beauty and a Beat"	Justin Bieber featuring Nicki Minaj	2012	21 October 2014 (4 re-release)
"We Can't Stop" (Note: Previously set to be a released DLC for Just Dance 2014, but was ultimately removed and delayed for an unknown reason, due to being ultimately released by accident. Therefore, the routine for the song has been remade, and differs from the original design from its debut.)	Miley Cyrus	2013	25 November 2014 (2014 re-release)
"Want U Back"	Cher Lloyd featuring Astro	2012	25 November 2014 (4 re-release)
"C'mon"	Kesha	2012	25 November 2014 (2014 re-release)
"Kiss You"	One Direction	2013	25 November 2014 (2014 re-release)
"Funhouse"	P!nk	2009	25 November 2014 (4 re-release)
"Boom Clap"	Charli XCX	2014	20 January 2015
"Kiss Kiss"	Prince Royce	2014	20 January 2015
"Let It Go" (Sing-Along Alternate)	Disney's Frozen (Cover by Nicki Gonzalez) (as made famous by Idina Menzel)	2013	20 January 2015
"India Waale"	From Happy New Year (Vishal Dadlani, K.K., Shankar Mahadevan and Neeti Mohan)	2014	20 January 2015
"Rock N Roll"	Avril Lavigne	2013	20 January 2015 (2014 re-release)

== Reception ==
Just Dance 2015 received mixed-to-positive reviews by critics; Metacritic lists the Xbox One version of the game with an aggregate score of 70 out of 100 based on 17 critic reviews, the PlayStation 4 version of the game with an aggregate score of 72 out of 100 based on 8 critic reviews, and the Wii U version of the game with an aggregate score of 75 out of 100 based on 6 critic reviews.

Zack Stein of IGN gave the Xbox One version of Just Dance 2015 an 8.0 out of 10; describing the game as "a welcome, surprising reinvigoration of the series", Stein praised the game for continuing to provide an overall experience catered to a casual audience, jump-in multiplayer, along with improved Kinect motion tracking in-game, and the higher-quality production of the per-song background videos, but criticized the user interface for being "as confusing and frustrating as ever" due to irregular design choices and behaviors. In conclusion, Stein felt that "It would be easy to dismiss Just Dance 2015 as the 'same-old-same-old,' but that would overlook this finely tuned party game's special-effects-laden dance numbers, complete with chorus lines and elaborate sets and costumes, and the social integration that holds the world-wide Just Dance community together."

GameRevolution, giving the game a 3 out of 5, felt that the game's soundtrack was "high-energy" albeit catered to a casual audience, noting that "singles like Pharrell's 'Happy' provide a strong pop basis while oddballs like a Tetris track or an unfortunately obnoxious song about a fox explore the far reaches of danceable contemporary music." Still, Just Dance 2015 was praised for its forgiving motion detection and multiplayer experience, concluding that "of my own preferences regarding the music genre, dancing remains somewhere out of the lead when it comes to interacting with sound and visuals, though Just Dance 2015 hits on every requirement I have from anything asking me to move my feet without a pad to stomp on."

Steve Hannley of Hardcore Gamer was more critical of Just Dance 2015, arguing that it did not provide enough differentiation over Just Dance 2014 to be described as anything more than a "track pack". Hannley felt that the game's social features, although well-designed, would not appeal to what he believed was the game's target audience (those playing the game for exercise, not wanting to dance in public, or are "underage"). The game's soundtrack was also criticized for being the worst in series history for "clearly catering to teeny boppers and in doing so [leaving] out practically anybody older than 21 with decent taste in music", and containing fewer "good" songs than 2014. In conclusion, giving the game a 3 out of 5, Hannley argued that "Just Dance is a series that's hard to hate as it genuinely wants players to have a good time, but 2015 is a misstep. Hardly anything has changed and practically nothing has for those who don't partake in the online functionality".

As of 31 December 2014 Just Dance 2015 has shipped 4 million copies.
