= Jenn Morel =

Dominican-American rapper, singer and songwriter (born 1990)

- Born: 23 February 1990 (age 35); Santiago, Dominican Republic
- Origin: Dominican Republic
- Genres: Pop, Hip hop
- Occupation(s): Rapper, Singer
- Instrument: Vocals
- Years active: 2016–present
- Labels: Insomniac Records

Jenn Morel is a Dominican-American rapper, singer and songwriter. She was born in the Dominican Republic. Her debut single, "Ponteme," peaked at number 3 on the Italian charts. In 2018, she signed with UMLE. She has released tracks on labels such as Insomniac Records.

== Early life ==
Jenn Morel was born in Santiago de los Caballeros. At the age of 6, her family moved to New York. She graduated from Lehman College with a Bachelor of Arts degree in sociology and dance.

== Career ==
Morel's break into music industry was as a dancer in night clubs. She later appeared in music videos for Drake, Nicki Minaj and Trey Songz. She also appeared in videos for LMFAO and Neyo.

Her debut single, "Ponteme," was released on 23 June 2017. It peaked at number 3 on the Italian charts.

Her single "Tra" was inspired by Don Chezina. She performed at the 2019 SXSW Festival.

She also released the single "Tiguere" for Insomniac Records, a collaboration with JST JR. In 2018, she signed with UMLE. She had a new album come out in 2020. She was featured in the Sounds of LatinX collection by Spotify.

== Personal life ==
She lives in Los Angeles.

== Discography ==
=== Albums ===
2020– Jenn Morel

=== Singles ===
List of singles, with selected chart positions, showing year released and album name
Title	Year	Peak chart positions		
Title	Year	US	ITA	FR
"Ponteme"	2017	—	3	180
"Licky"	2017	—	—	—
"Buscando" (with GTA)	2018	—	—	—
"Kumbara"	2018	—	—	—
"Tra"	2019	—	—	—
"Mango"	2020	—	—	—
"—" denotes a recording that did not chart or was not released in that territory.
