= Just Dance 2019 =

2018 video game

- Developers: Ubisoft Paris; Ubisoft Pune; Ubisoft Shanghai
- Publisher: Ubisoft
- Series: Just Dance
- Engine: UbiArt Framework
- Platforms: Wii; Wii U; Nintendo Switch; PlayStation 4; Xbox 360; Xbox One
- Release: NA: October 23, 2018; PAL: October 25, 2018
- Genre: Music
- Modes: Single-player; multiplayer

Just Dance 2019 is a 2018 dance rhythm game developed and published by Ubisoft. It was unveiled on June 11, 2018, during its E3 press conference as the tenth main installment of the series, and was released on October 23, 2018 on Nintendo Switch, Wii, Wii U, PlayStation 4, Xbox 360, and Xbox One in North America. It was also released on October 25, 2018 in Europe and Australia. A demo for the game was released on November 12, 2018, on Xbox One, PlayStation 4, Wii U, and Nintendo Switch.

Just Dance 2019 is notable for being the last game ever to be released for the Xbox 360 worldwide. It was also the last Just Dance game to be released on the Wii U console, and by extension, the final Wii U game to be published by Ubisoft.

== Gameplay ==
As with the previous installments of the franchise, players must mimic the on-screen dancer's choreography to a chosen song using either motion controllers (Wii Remotes on Wii and Wii U, PlayStation Move and PlayStation Camera on PlayStation 4, Kinect on Xbox 360 and One, and Joy-Con on Nintendo Switch) or the game's associated smartphone app.

The game's user interface received a significant redesign, with a focus on recommendations and curated playlists. It merged the World Dance Floor into the main "Just Dance" mode. Support for the Just Dance Controller app was absent on the Nintendo Switch version of the game, the only such occurrence in the entire series. The Wii U version doesn't have the ability to apply effects for "Autodance" videos, just like in previous entries.

Alongside of the brand new seasonal mechanic, the "World Dance Floor" mode has a brand new feature entitled seasonal points, where players earn points throughout the season.

The online features from Just Dance 2015 (the "Just Dance Wall" feature, the "challenge" feature, the online Autodance sharing feature and the "World Dance Floor" mode) were removed from the Wii, and Xbox 360 versions of the game, in which that said game was continued to be used as its basis.

== Soundtrack ==
The following songs appear on Just Dance 2019:

| Song | Artist | Year |
|---|---|---|
| "A Little Party Never Killed Nobody (All We Got)" | Fergie featuring Q-Tip and GoonRock | 2013 |
| "Adeyyo" | Ece Seçkin | 2016 |
| "Bang Bang Bang" | Big Bang | 2015 |
| "Bum Bum Tam Tam" | MC Fioti, Future, J Balvin, Stefflon Don and Juan Magan | 2017 |
| "Ça Plane Pour Moi" | Bob Platine (as made famous by Plastic Bertrand) | 1977 |
| "Calypso" | Luis Fonsi featuring Stefflon Don | 2018 |
| "Ddu-Du Ddu-Du" | Blackpink | 2018 |
| "Familiar" | Liam Payne and J Balvin | 2018 |
| "Finesse (Remix)" | Bruno Mars featuring Cardi B | 2018 |
| "Fire" | LLP featuring Mike Diamondz | 2015 |
| "Fire on the Dancefloor" (Note: Appears as "Fire on the Floor" on digital releases of the game & Just Dance Unlimited) (Note: Exclusive to eighth-generation consoles and only unlocked with a game code, most notable being "dancepgw") | Michelle Delamor | 2018 |
| "Havana" | Camila Cabello | 2017 |
| "I Feel It Coming" | The Weeknd featuring Daft Punk | 2016 |
| "I'm Still Standing" | Top Culture (as made famous by Elton John) | 1983 |
| "Mad Love" | Sean Paul and David Guetta featuring Becky G | 2018 |
| "Make Me Feel" (Note: Only playable on 8th-generation consoles with an internet connection) | Janelle Monáe | 2018 |
| "Mama Mia" | Mayra Verónica | 2013 |
| "Mi Mi Mi" | Hit The Electro Beat (as made famous by Serebro) | 2013 |
| "Miłość w Zakopanem" | Sławomir | 2017 |
| "Narco" | Blasterjaxx and Timmy Trumpet | 2017 |
| "New Reality" | Gigi Rowe | 2018 |
| "New Rules" | Dua Lipa | 2017 |
| "New World" | Krewella and Yellow Claw featuring Vava | 2018 |
| "No Tears Left to Cry" | Ariana Grande | 2018 |
| "Not Your Ordinary" | Stella Mwangi | 2017 |
| "Obsesión" | Aventura | 2002 |
| "OMG" | Arash featuring Snoop Dogg | 2016 |
| "One Kiss" (Note: Also available on the demo version of the game) | Calvin Harris and Dua Lipa | 2018 |
| "Pac-Man" | Dancing Bros. (Note: Pac-Man jingles composed by Toshio Kai.) | 1980 |
| "Rave in the Grave" | AronChupa featuring Little Sis Nora | 2018 |
| "The Rhythm of the Night" | Ultraclub 90 (as made famous by Corona) | 1993 |
| "Sangria Wine" | Pharrell Williams and Camila Cabello | 2018 |
| "Shaky Shaky" | Daddy Yankee | 2016 |
| "Sugar" | Maroon 5 | 2015 |
| "Sweet Little Unforgettable Thing" | Bea Miller | 2018 |
| "Sweet Sensation" | Flo Rida | 2018 |
| "Toy" | Netta | 2018 |
| "Un Poco Loco" | Disney-Pixar's Coco (as made famous by Anthony Gonzalez and Gael García Bernal) | 2017 |
| "Water Me" | Lizzo | 2017 |
| "Where Are You Now?" | Lady Leshurr featuring Wiley | 2016 |
| "Work Work" | Britney Spears | 2013 |

Drake's "Nice for What" was included in initial pressings of the game, but was removed from versions on eighth generation consoles via patches shortly after the release of the game itself due to licensing issues. However, the song can still be played on older copies of the Wii and Xbox 360 versions.

=== Kids Mode ===
The following songs appear on the Kids Mode of the game:

| Song | Artist | Year |
|---|---|---|
| "Boogiesaurus" | A. Caveman and the Backseats | 2018 |
| "Cosmic Party" | Equinox Stars | 2018 |
| "Friendly Phantom" | Halloween Thrills | 1996 |
| "Irish Meadow Dance" (Note: Abridged version of a song that previously appeared in Just Dance 2016) | O'Callaghan's Orchestra | 2015 |
| "Jingle Bells" (Note: Previously appeared in Just Dance Kids 2 but with a different routine) | Santa Clones (Note: Originally credited as The Just Dance Kids. Originally composed by James Lord Pierpont.) | 1857 |
| "Mi Mi Mi" | Hit The Electro Beat (as made famous by Serebro) | 2013 |
| "Monsters of Jazz" | Groove Century | 2018 |
| "Shinobi Cat" | Glorious Black Belts | 2018 |
| "Sugar" | Maroon 5 | 2015 |
| "Tales of the Desert" | Persian Nights | 2008 |
| "Un Poco Loco" | Disney-Pixar's Coco (as made famous by Anthony Gonzalez and Gael García Bernal) | 2017 |
| "Water Me" | Lizzo | 2017 |

Note: These songs also can be played on Wii and Xbox 360.

=== Just Dance Unlimited ===
Just Dance Unlimited is a subscription-based service for accessing a streaming library of songs, including new exclusives and songs from previous Just Dance games. As with all previous releases to include Unlimited, the feature is only supported on eighth-generation consoles. As of the release of 2019, all future songs added to the service will be exclusive to it.

Songs exclusive to Just Dance Unlimited include:

| Song | Artist | Year | Release date |
|---|---|---|---|
| "There Is Nothing Better In The World" (Note: Also available as a Russian-exclusive track on the soundtrack) | Oleg Anofriyev | 1969 | October 22, 2018 (Russia); December 20, 2018 (Worldwide) |
| "Hala Bel Khamis" (Note: Also available as a Middle Eastern-exclusive track on the soundtrack) | Maan Barghouth | 2018 | October 22, 2018 (Middle East); December 20, 2018 (Worldwide) |
| "On Ne Porte Pas De Sous-Vêtements" (Note: Also available as a French-exclusive track on the soundtrack) | McFly & Carlito | 2018 | October 22, 2018 (France); December 20, 2018 (Worldwide) |
| "Done For Me" (Note: Season 1: Holiday Celebration) | Charlie Puth featuring Kehlani | 2018 | December 20, 2018 |
| "Karaoke Forever – Future Underworld Mix" (Note: Also appeared in the Chinese version of Just Dance 2017, in which it's also known as "Qia La Yong Yuan OK - Future Underworld Mix") | Alan Tam | 1990 | February 5, 2019 |
| "Leg Song" (Note: Also appeared in the Chinese version of Just Dance 2017, in which it's also known as "Tui Zhi Ge") | Lulu | 2016 | February 5, 2019 |
| "Medicina" (Note: Season 2: Crazy Carnival) (Note: Season 3: Summer Vibes) | Anitta | 2018 | March 7, 2019 (Classic); June 27, 2019 (Alternate) |
| "Lush Life" | Zara Larsson | 2015 | March 14, 2019 |
| "Criminal" | Natti Natasha and Ozuna | 2017 | March 21, 2019 |
| "Jump" | Major Lazer featuring Busy Signal | 2017 | July 4, 2019 |
| "Peanut Butter Jelly" | Galantis | 2015 | July 11, 2019 |
| "You Don't Know Me" (Note: Season 4: Just Dance 2020 Celebration) | Jax Jones featuring Raye | 2016 | October 24, 2019 |
| "Boys" | Lizzo | 2018 | October 31, 2019 |
| "Mayores" | Becky G featuring Bad Bunny | 2017 | November 7, 2019 |

== Reception ==
Nintendo Life gave Just Dance 2019 a 7 out of 10, noting that its stripped-down experience was "a strange shift to behold, suggesting that the game is trying to adapt to a new Spotify-using, social media-loving, older teen audience, or maybe growing up alongside those who have supported it from the beginning", and also acknowledged Ubisoft's continued emphasis on pushing its subscription-based offerings for the franchise, as well as performance issues and the removal of Just Dance Controller app support on the Nintendo Switch version.

The game won the award for "Favorite Video Game" at the 2019 Kids' Choice Awards, and was nominated for "People's Choice" at the Italian Video Game Awards.
