= Just Dance 2016 =

2015 video game

- Developers: Ubisoft Paris; Ubisoft Pune
- Publisher: Ubisoft
- Series: Just Dance
- Engine: UbiArt Framework
- Platforms: PlayStation 3, PlayStation 4, Xbox 360, Xbox One, Wii U, Wii
- Release: NA: October 20, 2015; PAL: October 22, 2015; UK: October 23, 2015
- Genres: Music, Rhythm
- Modes: Single-player, multiplayer

Just Dance 2016 is a 2015 dance rhythm game developed and published by Ubisoft. Unveiled on June 15, 2015, during its E3 press conference as the seventh main installment of the series, it was released in October 2015 for PlayStation 3, PlayStation 4, Xbox 360, Xbox One, Wii, and Wii U.

The game notably placed an emphasis on the use of a smartphone mobile app for motion detection, and introduced a subscription-based service which offers streaming access to a back catalogue of songs from previous entries in the franchise, as well as additional content that is exclusive to the service.

== Gameplay ==
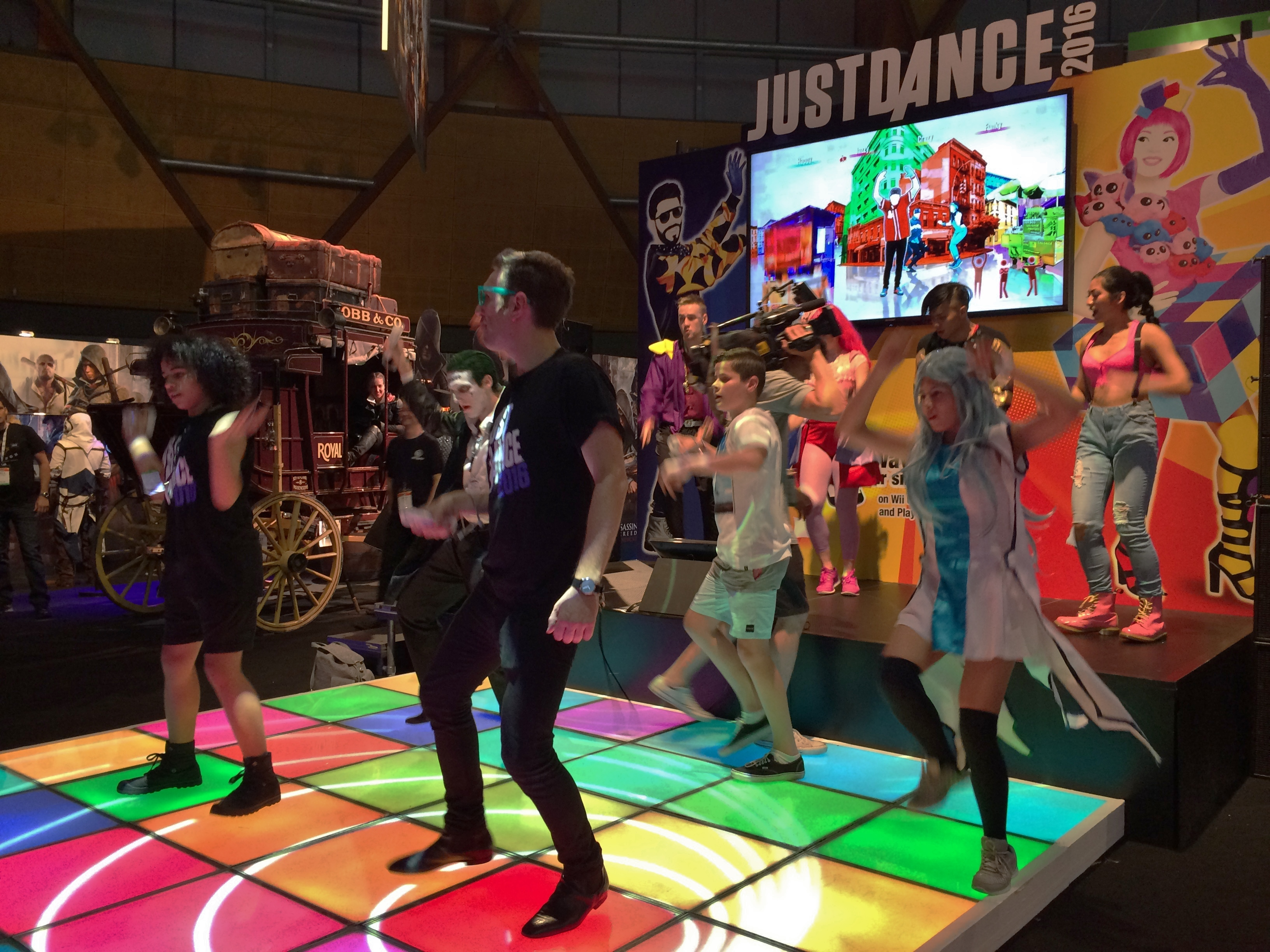
Just Dance 2016 at EB Expo 2015

As with previous installments, players select a song, and then follow the motions of on-screen dancer(s) and their choreographed routine. Players are judged on a ranking scale for the accuracy of each of their moves in comparison to that of the on-screen dancer. The game supports the use of each console's motion controller accessories (Kinect on Xbox 360 and One, PlayStation Camera on PS4, PlayStation Move on PS3 and PS4, and Wii Remotes on Wii and Wii U); alternatively, players can utilize a smartphone app for motion tracking.

Standard gameplay has been re-organized under the banner of "Dance Party" mode—encompassing competitive and co-operative multiplayer modes, with co-op mode allowing players to earn jewels as a team, with up to 10 jewels for either a four, five, or six person team, and the ability to send recordings of performances alongside challenges to other players. In the "Dance Quests" mode, players compete against a computer opponent across three randomly selected songs. Versions for eighth-generation consoles also include "Showtime", which allows players to record short lip sync music videos to songs with themed visual effects.

While the Wii, PS3, and Xbox 360 versions of the game are based on Just Dance 2015, all of the online features from that said game, including the "challenge" feature, the "Just Dance Wall" feature, and the "World Dance Floor", made a return. The "Community Remix" feature, returning from Just Dance 2015, was revamped with player videos being added into the background of the original choreography, excluding "Uptown Funk", in a full screen format instead of the windowed format, with the latter format still being used in the Wii, PS3, and Xbox 360 versions of the game. Mashups now use the remade versions of the routines shown in the first three main games in the Just Dance series, first shown in Just Dance Now, unlike the pictures of coaches using the original designs from these games being remade in Just Dance 2015. The Wii U version doesn't have the ability to apply effects for "Autodance" videos, just like in previous entries. Furthermore, all songs will now feature pre-rendered backgrounds instead of in-game backgrounds. This excluded the on-disc Mashups.

All online services of the game were discontinued for the Wii, PS3, and Xbox 360 versions on November 19, 2018, followed by all other platforms on July 3, 2023.

== Soundtrack ==
The following songs appear on Just Dance 2016:

| Song | Artist | Year |
|---|---|---|
| "All About That Bass" | Meghan Trainor | 2014 |
| "Animals" | Martin Garrix | 2013 |
| "Balkan Blast Remix" | Angry Birds (Note: Angry Birds theme composed by Ari Pulkkinen.) | 2015 |
| "Blame" (Note: Also available on the demo version of the game.) | Calvin Harris featuring John Newman | 2014 |
| "Born This Way" | Lady Gaga | 2011 |
| "Boys (Summertime Love)" | The Lemon Cubes (as made famous by Sabrina) | 1987 |
| "Chiwawa" | Wanko Ni Mero Mero | 2015 |
| "Circus" | Britney Spears | 2008 |
| "Cool for the Summer" | Demi Lovato | 2015 |
| "Copacabana" | Frankie Bostello (as made famous by Barry Manilow) | 1978 |
| "Drop The Mambo" | Diva Carmina | 2015 |
| "Fancy" | Iggy Azalea featuring Charli XCX | 2014 |
| "Fun" | Pitbull featuring Chris Brown | 2015 |
| "Gibberish" | MAX | 2015 |
| "Hangover (BaBaBa)" | Buraka Som Sistema | 2011 |
| "Heartbeat Song" | Kelly Clarkson | 2015 |
| "Hey Mama" | David Guetta featuring Nicki Minaj, Bebe Rexha and Afrojack | 2015 |
| "Hit the Road Jack" | Charles Percy (as made famous by Ray Charles) | 1961 |
| "I Gotta Feeling" | The Black Eyed Peas | 2009 |
| "I'm an Albatraoz" | AronChupa | 2014 |
| "Ievan Polkka" (Note: Also known in the Chinese version of Just Dance 2020 as "Shuai Cong Ge") | Hatsune Miku (Note: Arranged and Voice Manipulated by Otomania. Based on the original song, written by Eino Kettunen.) | 2007 |
| "Irish Meadow Dance" | O'Callaghan's Orchestra | 2015 |
| "Junto A Ti" | Cast of Disney's Violetta | 2012 |
| "Kaboom Pow" | Nikki Yanofsky | 2015 |
| "Kool Kontact" | Glorious Black Belts | 2015 |
| "Let's Groove" (Note: Also available as a bonus song for the demo version of Just Dance 2020 for Xfinity customers, alongside "Old Town Road (Remix)") | Equinox Stars (as made famous by Earth, Wind & Fire) | 1981 |
| "Lights" | Ellie Goulding | 2011 |
| "No Control" | One Direction | 2014 |
| "Rabiosa" | Shakira featuring El Cata | 2011 |
| "Same Old Love" | Selena Gomez | 2015 |
| "Stadium Flow" | Imposs | 2015 |
| "Stuck on a Feeling" | Prince Royce | 2014 |
| "Teacher" | Nick Jonas | 2014 |
| "The Choice Is Yours" | Darius Dante Van Dijk | 2015 |
| "These Boots Are Made For Walkin'" | The Girly Team (as made famous by Nancy Sinatra) | 1966 |
| "This Is How We Do" | Katy Perry | 2014 |
| "Under the Sea" | Disney's The Little Mermaid (as made famous by Samuel E. Wright) | 1989 |
| "Uptown Funk" | Mark Ronson featuring Bruno Mars | 2014 |
| "Want to Want Me" | Jason Derulo | 2015 |
| "When the Rain Begins to Fall" | Sky Trucking (as made famous by Jermaine Jackson and Pia Zadora) | 1984 |
| "William Tell Overture" | Rossini | 1828 |
| "You Never Can Tell" (Note: The original version of this song was meant to appear in the previous game: Just Dance 2015, but was taken out for an unknown reason.) | A. Caveman & The Backseats (as made famous by Chuck Berry) | 1964 |
| "You're the One That I Want" | From the Movie Grease (as made famous by John Travolta and Olivia Newton-John) | 1978 |

=== Just Dance Unlimited ===
Versions of the game on eighth-generation consoles support Just Dance Unlimited, which offers subscription-based access to a streaming library of songs from previous Just Dance games, and new songs that are exclusive to the service. Ubisoft stated that the service would offer at least 150 songs on-launch. A three-month subscription to Just Dance Unlimited is included as part of a higher-priced version of Just Dance 2016 known as the "Gold Edition".

Songs exclusive to this service include:

| Song | Artist | Year | Release date |
|---|---|---|---|
| "Cheerleader (Felix Jaehn remix)" | Omi | 2014 | October 20, 2015 |
| "Smile" | Iowa | 2012 | October 20, 2015 |
| "Better When I'm Dancin'" | Meghan Trainor | 2015 | November 25, 2015 |
| "Shut Up and Dance" | Walk the Moon | 2014 | January 20, 2016 |
| "Get Ugly" | Jason Derulo | 2015 | February 26, 2016 |
| "Taste the Feeling" | Avicii and Conrad Sewell | 2016 | March 10, 2016 (Classic); July 11, 2016 (Alternate) |
| "Am I Wrong" | Nico & Vinz | 2013 | April 21, 2016 |
| "Hold My Hand" | Jess Glynne | 2015 | May 19, 2016 |

== Reception ==
Steve Hannley of Hardcore Gamer criticised Just Dance 2016 for its lack of differentiation from previous versions, especially for a franchise described as having reached "Guitar Hero levels of saturation". Although the Dance Quest mode was partially praised for being a new feature at all, it was declared redundant to manually picking three songs to play in a row, and all of the new modes in 2016 were panned for being "glorified ways to play the game in exactly the same way". The soundtrack was considered to be worse than that of Just Dance 2015 (which he had previously described as having the worst in series history), citing "terrible" songs, lacking "underground" electronic dance music, and containing too many older songs (noting that only 8 of the 44 on-disc songs were released within the year). The Just Dance Now service was speculated as being the potential future of the franchise, noting that "at $39.99 a year (or the insane $6.99 a month), it's priced just under the cost of the game at retail and considering the gameplay hasn't changed the past three years, it makes sense to simply phase this in as the complete replacement of annual releases." In conclusion, Hannley gave Just Dance 2016 a 2.5 out of 5, concluding that "while the core gameplay remains fun despite some questionable choreography, the overall package reeks of complete and utter apathy. Basic Kinect features have been stripped, there's an unnecessary focus on smartphone use and only eight licensed songs of the over forty included in total are from this year, which is a huge issue considering that the series has devolved into a glorified track pack."

=== Awards ===
| Year | Award / Film Festival | Category | Result | Ref(s) |
|---|---|---|---|---|
| 2016 | 2016 Kids' Choice Awards | Favorite Video Game | Won | |
