= List of Ubisoft games: 2020–present =

== Games ==
Title	Platform(s)	Release date	Developer(s)	Ref.
Might & Magic: Chess Royale	Android	January 29, 2020	Ubisoft Paris Mobile	
Might & Magic: Chess Royale	iOS	January 29, 2020	Ubisoft Paris Mobile	
Might & Magic: Chess Royale	Windows	January 29, 2020	Ubisoft Paris Mobile	
Tom Clancy's The Division 2	Stadia	March 17, 2020	Massive Entertainment	
The Crew 2	Stadia	March 25, 2020	Ubisoft Ivory Tower	
Trackmania	Windows	July 1, 2020	Ubisoft Nadeo	
Trackmania	PlayStation 4	May 15, 2023	Ubisoft Nadeo	
Trackmania	PlayStation 5	May 15, 2023	Ubisoft Nadeo	
Trackmania	Xbox One	May 15, 2023	Ubisoft Nadeo	
Trackmania	Xbox Series X/S	May 15, 2023	Ubisoft Nadeo	
Brawlhalla	Android	August 6, 2020	Blue Mammoth Games	
Brawlhalla	iOS	August 6, 2020	Blue Mammoth Games	
Hyper Scape	PlayStation 4	August 11, 2020	Ubisoft Montreal	
Hyper Scape	Windows	August 11, 2020	Ubisoft Montreal	
Hyper Scape	Xbox One	August 11, 2020	Ubisoft Montreal	
Tom Clancy's Elite Squad	Android	August 25, 2020	Ubisoft Owlient	
Tom Clancy's Elite Squad	iOS	August 25, 2020	Ubisoft Owlient	
Rabbids: Coding!	Android	October 8, 2020	Ubisoft Montreal	
Rabbids: Coding!	iOS	October 8, 2020	Ubisoft Montreal	
Rabbids: Wild Race	Windows	October 12, 2020	Ubisoft Da Nang	
AGOS: A Game of Space	HTC Vive	October 28, 2020	Ubisoft Paris	
AGOS: A Game of Space	Oculus Rift	October 28, 2020	Ubisoft Paris	
AGOS: A Game of Space	Valve Index	October 28, 2020	Ubisoft Paris	
Watch Dogs: Legion	PlayStation 4	October 29, 2020	Ubisoft Toronto	
Watch Dogs: Legion	Stadia	October 29, 2020	Ubisoft Toronto	
Watch Dogs: Legion	Windows	October 29, 2020	Ubisoft Toronto	
Watch Dogs: Legion	Xbox One	October 29, 2020	Ubisoft Toronto	
Watch Dogs: Legion	Xbox Series X/S	November 10, 2020	Ubisoft Toronto	
Watch Dogs: Legion	PlayStation 5	November 12, 2020	Ubisoft Toronto	
Assassin's Creed Valhalla	PlayStation 4	November 10, 2020	Ubisoft Montreal	
Assassin's Creed Valhalla	Stadia	November 10, 2020	Ubisoft Montreal	
Assassin's Creed Valhalla	Windows	November 10, 2020	Ubisoft Montreal	
Assassin's Creed Valhalla	Xbox One	November 10, 2020	Ubisoft Montreal	
Assassin's Creed Valhalla	Xbox Series X/S	November 10, 2020	Ubisoft Montreal	
Assassin's Creed Valhalla	PlayStation 5	November 12, 2020	Ubisoft Montreal	
Family Feud	PlayStation 4	November 12, 2020	Snap Finger Click	
Family Feud	Stadia	November 12, 2020	Snap Finger Click	
Family Feud	Switch	November 12, 2020	Snap Finger Click	
Family Feud	Xbox One	November 12, 2020	Snap Finger Click	
Just Dance 2021	PlayStation 4	November 12, 2020	Ubisoft Paris	
Just Dance 2021	Stadia	November 12, 2020	Ubisoft Paris	
Just Dance 2021	Switch	November 12, 2020	Ubisoft Paris	
Just Dance 2021	Xbox One	November 12, 2020	Ubisoft Paris	
Just Dance 2021	PlayStation 5	November 24, 2020	Ubisoft Paris	
Just Dance 2021	Xbox Series X/S	November 24, 2020	Ubisoft Paris	
Tom Clancy's Rainbow Six Siege	PlayStation 5	December 1, 2020	Ubisoft Montreal	
Tom Clancy's Rainbow Six Siege	Xbox Series X/S	December 1, 2020	Ubisoft Montreal	
Tom Clancy's Rainbow Six Siege	Stadia	June 30, 2021	Ubisoft Montreal	
Idle Restaurant Tycoon	Android	December 3, 2020	Kolibri Games	
Idle Restaurant Tycoon	iOS	December 3, 2020	Kolibri Games	
Immortals Fenyx Rising	PlayStation 4	December 3, 2020	Ubisoft Quebec	
Immortals Fenyx Rising	PlayStation 5	December 3, 2020	Ubisoft Quebec	
Immortals Fenyx Rising	Stadia	December 3, 2020	Ubisoft Quebec	
Immortals Fenyx Rising	Switch	December 3, 2020	Ubisoft Quebec	
Immortals Fenyx Rising	Windows	December 3, 2020	Ubisoft Quebec	
Immortals Fenyx Rising	Xbox One	December 3, 2020	Ubisoft Quebec	
Immortals Fenyx Rising	Xbox Series X/S	December 3, 2020	Ubisoft Quebec	
Scott Pilgrim vs. The World: The Game - Complete Edition	PlayStation 4	January 14, 2021	Engine Software	
Scott Pilgrim vs. The World: The Game - Complete Edition	Stadia	January 14, 2021	Engine Software	
Scott Pilgrim vs. The World: The Game - Complete Edition	Switch	January 14, 2021	Engine Software	
Scott Pilgrim vs. The World: The Game - Complete Edition	Windows	January 14, 2021	Engine Software	
Scott Pilgrim vs. The World: The Game - Complete Edition	Xbox One	January 14, 2021	Engine Software	
Far Cry 6	PlayStation 4	October 7, 2021	Ubisoft Toronto	
Far Cry 6	PlayStation 5	October 7, 2021	Ubisoft Toronto	
Far Cry 6	Stadia	October 7, 2021	Ubisoft Toronto	
Far Cry 6	Windows	October 7, 2021	Ubisoft Toronto	
Far Cry 6	Xbox One	October 7, 2021	Ubisoft Toronto	
Far Cry 6	Xbox Series X/S	October 7, 2021	Ubisoft Toronto	
Discovery Tour: Viking Age	Windows	October 19, 2021	Ubisoft Montreal	
Discovery Tour: Viking Age	PlayStation 4	June 14, 2022	Ubisoft Montreal	
Discovery Tour: Viking Age	PlayStation 5	June 14, 2022	Ubisoft Montreal	
Discovery Tour: Viking Age	Stadia	June 14, 2022	Ubisoft Montreal	
Discovery Tour: Viking Age	Xbox One	June 14, 2022	Ubisoft Montreal	
Discovery Tour: Viking Age	Xbox Series X/S	June 14, 2022	Ubisoft Montreal	
Riders Republic	PlayStation 4	October 28, 2021	Ubisoft Annecy	
Riders Republic	PlayStation 5	October 28, 2021	Ubisoft Annecy	
Riders Republic	Stadia	October 28, 2021	Ubisoft Annecy	
Riders Republic	Windows	October 28, 2021	Ubisoft Annecy	
Riders Republic	Xbox One	October 28, 2021	Ubisoft Annecy	
Riders Republic	Xbox Series X/S	October 28, 2021	Ubisoft Annecy	
Riders Republic	Switch 2	December 9, 2026	Ubisoft Annecy	
Just Dance 2022	PlayStation 4	November 4, 2021	Ubisoft Paris	
Just Dance 2022	PlayStation 5	November 4, 2021	Ubisoft Paris	
Just Dance 2022	Stadia	November 4, 2021	Ubisoft Paris	
Just Dance 2022	Switch	November 4, 2021	Ubisoft Paris	
Just Dance 2022	Xbox One	November 4, 2021	Ubisoft Paris	
Just Dance 2022	Xbox Series X/S	November 4, 2021	Ubisoft Paris	
Monopoly Madness	PlayStation 4	December 9, 2021	Engine Software	
Monopoly Madness	PlayStation 5	December 9, 2021	Engine Software	
Monopoly Madness	Stadia	December 9, 2021	Engine Software	
Monopoly Madness	Switch	December 9, 2021	Engine Software	
Monopoly Madness	Windows	December 9, 2021	Engine Software	
Monopoly Madness	Xbox One	December 9, 2021	Engine Software	
Monopoly Madness	Xbox Series X/S	December 9, 2021	Engine Software	
Clash of Beasts	Android	January 11, 2022	Ubisoft Abu Dhabi	
Clash of Beasts	iOS	January 11, 2022	Ubisoft Abu Dhabi	
Tom Clancy's Rainbow Six Extraction	PlayStation 4	January 20, 2022	Ubisoft Montreal	
Tom Clancy's Rainbow Six Extraction	PlayStation 5	January 20, 2022	Ubisoft Montreal	
Tom Clancy's Rainbow Six Extraction	Stadia	January 20, 2022	Ubisoft Montreal	
Tom Clancy's Rainbow Six Extraction	Windows	January 20, 2022	Ubisoft Montreal	
Tom Clancy's Rainbow Six Extraction	Xbox One	January 20, 2022	Ubisoft Montreal	
Tom Clancy's Rainbow Six Extraction	Xbox Series X/S	January 20, 2022	Ubisoft Montreal	
Assassin's Creed: The Ezio Collection	Switch	February 17, 2022	Virtuos	
Trivial Pursuit Live! 2	PlayStation 4	March 17, 2022	Snap Finger Click	
Trivial Pursuit Live! 2	Stadia	March 17, 2022	Snap Finger Click	
Trivial Pursuit Live! 2	Switch	March 17, 2022	Snap Finger Click	
Trivial Pursuit Live! 2	Xbox One	March 17, 2022	Snap Finger Click	
Roller Champions	PlayStation 4	May 25, 2022	Ubisoft Montreal	
Roller Champions	Windows	May 25, 2022	Ubisoft Montreal	
Roller Champions	Xbox One	May 25, 2022	Ubisoft Montreal	
Roller Champions	Switch	June 21, 2022	Ubisoft Montreal	
Rabbids: Party of Legends	PlayStation 4	June 30, 2022	Ubisoft Chengdu	
Rabbids: Party of Legends	Stadia	June 30, 2022	Ubisoft Chengdu	
Rabbids: Party of Legends	Switch	June 30, 2022	Ubisoft Chengdu	
Rabbids: Party of Legends	Xbox One	June 30, 2022	Ubisoft Chengdu	
Wild Arena Survivors	Android	August 30, 2022	Ubisoft Paris Mobile	
Wild Arena Survivors	iOS	August 30, 2022	Ubisoft Paris Mobile	
Rocksmith+	Windows	September 6, 2022	Ubisoft San Francisco	
Rocksmith+	Android	June 9, 2023	Ubisoft San Francisco	
Rocksmith+	iOS	June 9, 2023	Ubisoft San Francisco	
Rocksmith+	PlayStation 4	June 6, 2024	Ubisoft San Francisco	
Rocksmith+	PlayStation 5	June 6, 2024	Ubisoft San Francisco	
Mario + Rabbids Sparks of Hope	Switch	October 20, 2022	Ubisoft Milan, Ubisoft Paris	
Just Dance 2023 Edition	PlayStation 5	November 22, 2022	Ubisoft Paris	
Just Dance 2023 Edition	Switch	November 22, 2022	Ubisoft Paris	
Just Dance 2023 Edition	Xbox Series X/S	November 22, 2022	Ubisoft Paris	
OddBallers	PlayStation 4	January 23, 2023	Ubisoft Mumbai, Game Swing	
OddBallers	Switch	January 23, 2023	Ubisoft Mumbai, Game Swing	
OddBallers	Windows	January 23, 2023	Ubisoft Mumbai, Game Swing	
OddBallers	Xbox One	January 23, 2023	Ubisoft Mumbai, Game Swing	
Valiant Hearts: Coming Home	Android	January 31, 2023	Ubisoft Montpellier, Old Skull Games (Note: Published by Netflix Games)	
Valiant Hearts: Coming Home	iOS	January 31, 2023	Ubisoft Montpellier, Old Skull Games	
Valiant Hearts: Coming Home	PlayStation 4	March 7, 2024	Ubisoft Da Nang	
Valiant Hearts: Coming Home	PlayStation 5	March 7, 2024	Ubisoft Da Nang	
Valiant Hearts: Coming Home	Switch	March 7, 2024	Ubisoft Da Nang	
Valiant Hearts: Coming Home	Windows	March 7, 2024	Ubisoft Da Nang	
Valiant Hearts: Coming Home	Xbox One	March 7, 2024	Ubisoft Da Nang	
Valiant Hearts: Coming Home	Xbox Series X/S	March 7, 2024	Ubisoft Da Nang	
The Settlers: New Allies	Windows	February 17, 2023	Ubisoft Düsseldorf	
The Settlers: New Allies	PlayStation 4	July 4, 2023	Ubisoft Düsseldorf	
The Settlers: New Allies	PlayStation 5	July 4, 2023	Ubisoft Düsseldorf	
The Settlers: New Allies	Switch	July 4, 2023	Ubisoft Düsseldorf	
The Settlers: New Allies	Xbox One	July 4, 2023	Ubisoft Düsseldorf	
The Settlers: New Allies	Xbox Series X/S	July 4, 2023	Ubisoft Düsseldorf	
Anno 1800 Console Edition	PlayStation 5	March 16, 2023	Ubisoft Mainz	
Anno 1800 Console Edition	Xbox Series X/S	March 16, 2023	Ubisoft Mainz	
Mighty Quest Rogue Palace	Android	April 18, 2023	Ubisoft Paris Mobile	
Mighty Quest Rogue Palace	iOS	April 18, 2023	Ubisoft Paris Mobile	
The Crew Motorfest	PlayStation 4	September 14, 2023	Ubisoft Ivory Tower	
The Crew Motorfest	PlayStation 5	September 14, 2023	Ubisoft Ivory Tower	
The Crew Motorfest	Windows	September 14, 2023	Ubisoft Ivory Tower	
The Crew Motorfest	Xbox One	September 14, 2023	Ubisoft Ivory Tower	
The Crew Motorfest	Xbox Series X/S	September 14, 2023	Ubisoft Ivory Tower	
The Crew Motorfest	Switch 2	October 8, 2026	Ubisoft Ivory Tower	
Assassin's Creed Mirage	PlayStation 4	October 5, 2023	Ubisoft Bordeaux	
Assassin's Creed Mirage	PlayStation 5	October 5, 2023	Ubisoft Bordeaux	
Assassin's Creed Mirage	Windows	October 5, 2023	Ubisoft Bordeaux	
Assassin's Creed Mirage	Xbox One	October 5, 2023	Ubisoft Bordeaux	
Assassin's Creed Mirage	Xbox Series X/S	October 5, 2023	Ubisoft Bordeaux	
Assassin's Creed Mirage	iOS	June 6, 2024	Ubisoft Bordeaux	
Assassin's Creed Mirage	iPadOS	June 6, 2024	Ubisoft Bordeaux	
Just Dance 2024 Edition	PlayStation 5	October 24, 2023	Ubisoft Paris	
Just Dance 2024 Edition	Switch	October 24, 2023	Ubisoft Paris	
Just Dance 2024 Edition	Xbox Series X/S	October 24, 2023	Ubisoft Paris	
Assassin's Creed Nexus VR	Meta Quest 2	November 16, 2023	Red Storm Entertainment	
Assassin's Creed Nexus VR	Meta Quest 3	November 16, 2023	Red Storm Entertainment	
Avatar: Frontiers of Pandora	PlayStation 5	December 7, 2023	Massive Entertainment	
Avatar: Frontiers of Pandora	Windows	December 7, 2023	Massive Entertainment	
Avatar: Frontiers of Pandora	Xbox Series X/S	December 7, 2023	Massive Entertainment	
Prince of Persia: The Lost Crown	PlayStation 4	January 18, 2024	Ubisoft Montpellier	
Prince of Persia: The Lost Crown	PlayStation 5	January 18, 2024	Ubisoft Montpellier	
Prince of Persia: The Lost Crown	Switch	January 18, 2024	Ubisoft Montpellier	
Prince of Persia: The Lost Crown	Windows	January 18, 2024	Ubisoft Montpellier	
Prince of Persia: The Lost Crown	Xbox One	January 18, 2024	Ubisoft Montpellier	
Prince of Persia: The Lost Crown	Xbox Series X/S	January 18, 2024	Ubisoft Montpellier	
Prince of Persia: The Lost Crown	macOS	December 3, 2024	Ubisoft Montpellier	
Prince of Persia: The Lost Crown	Android	April 14, 2025	Ubisoft Da Nang	
Prince of Persia: The Lost Crown	iOS	April 14, 2025	Ubisoft Da Nang	
Skull and Bones	PlayStation 5	February 16, 2024	Ubisoft Singapore	
Skull and Bones	Windows	February 16, 2024	Ubisoft Singapore	
Skull and Bones	Xbox Series X/S	February 16, 2024	Ubisoft Singapore	
Invincible: Guarding the Globe	Android	February 19, 2024	Ubisoft Barcelona	
Invincible: Guarding the Globe	iOS	February 19, 2024	Ubisoft Barcelona	
Rainbow Six SMOL	Android	February 20, 2024	Ubisoft Montreal	
Rainbow Six SMOL	iOS	February 20, 2024	Ubisoft Montreal	
XDefiant	PlayStation 5	May 21, 2024	Ubisoft San Francisco	
XDefiant	Windows	May 21, 2024	Ubisoft San Francisco	
XDefiant	Xbox Series X/S	May 21, 2024	Ubisoft San Francisco	
The Rogue Prince of Persia	Windows	May 27, 2024 (early access)	Evil Empire	
The Rogue Prince of Persia	PlayStation 5	August 20, 2025 (full release)	Evil Empire	
The Rogue Prince of Persia	Windows	August 20, 2025 (full release)	Evil Empire	
The Rogue Prince of Persia	Xbox Series X/S	August 20, 2025 (full release)	Evil Empire	
The Rogue Prince of Persia	Switch	December 16, 2025	Evil Empire	
The Rogue Prince of Persia	Switch 2	December 16, 2025	Evil Empire	
BattleCore Arena	Windows	June 6, 2024 (early access)	Ubisoft Bordeaux, Cosmic Ray Studio	
BattleCore Arena	Windows	January 30, 2025 (full release)	Ubisoft Bordeaux, Cosmic Ray Studio	
Rabbids: Legends of the Multiverse	iOS	June 6, 2024	Ubisoft Da Nang	
Rabbids: Legends of the Multiverse	macOS	June 6, 2024	Ubisoft Da Nang	
Rabbids: Legends of the Multiverse	tvOS	June 6, 2024	Ubisoft Da Nang	
Beyond Good & Evil 20th Anniversary Edition	PlayStation 4	June 25, 2024	Ubisoft Montpellier, Virtuos	
Beyond Good & Evil 20th Anniversary Edition	PlayStation 5	June 25, 2024	Ubisoft Montpellier, Virtuos	
Beyond Good & Evil 20th Anniversary Edition	Switch	June 25, 2024	Ubisoft Montpellier, Virtuos	
Beyond Good & Evil 20th Anniversary Edition	Windows	June 25, 2024	Ubisoft Montpellier, Virtuos	
Beyond Good & Evil 20th Anniversary Edition	Xbox One	June 25, 2024	Ubisoft Montpellier, Virtuos	
Beyond Good & Evil 20th Anniversary Edition	Xbox Series X/S	June 25, 2024	Ubisoft Montpellier, Virtuos	
Star Wars Outlaws	PlayStation 5	August 30, 2024	Massive Entertainment	
Star Wars Outlaws	Windows	August 30, 2024	Massive Entertainment	
Star Wars Outlaws	Xbox Series X/S	August 30, 2024	Massive Entertainment	
Star Wars Outlaws	Switch 2	September 4, 2025	Massive Entertainment	
Monopoly (2024)	PlayStation 4	September 26, 2024	Engine Software	
Monopoly (2024)	PlayStation 5	September 26, 2024	Engine Software	
Monopoly (2024)	Switch	September 26, 2024	Engine Software	
Monopoly (2024)	Windows	September 26, 2024	Engine Software	
Monopoly (2024)	Xbox One	September 26, 2024	Engine Software	
Monopoly (2024)	Xbox Series X/S	September 26, 2024	Engine Software	
Just Dance 2025 Edition	PlayStation 5	October 15, 2024	Ubisoft Paris	
Just Dance 2025 Edition	Switch	October 15, 2024	Ubisoft Paris	
Just Dance 2025 Edition	Xbox Series X/S	October 15, 2024	Ubisoft Paris	
Just Dance VR	Meta Quest 2	October 15, 2024	Ubisoft Paris, Soul Assembly	
Just Dance VR	Meta Quest 3	October 15, 2024	Ubisoft Paris, Soul Assembly	
Champions Tactics: Grimoria Chronicles	Windows	October 23, 2024	Ubisoft Paris	
NFL Primetime Fantasy	Android	November 20, 2024	Ubisoft Saguenay	
NFL Primetime Fantasy	iOS	November 20, 2024	Ubisoft Saguenay	
Captain Laserhawk: the G.A.M.E.	Windows	December 18, 2024	Arbitrum Foundation	
BUMP! Superbrawl	Android	January 28, 2025	Ubisoft Paris Mobile	
BUMP! Superbrawl	iOS	January 28, 2025	Ubisoft Paris Mobile	
BUMP! Superbrawl	Windows	January 28, 2025	Ubisoft Paris Mobile	
Assassin's Creed Shadows	macOS	March 20, 2025	Ubisoft Quebec	
Assassin's Creed Shadows	PlayStation 5	March 20, 2025	Ubisoft Quebec	
Assassin's Creed Shadows	Windows	March 20, 2025	Ubisoft Quebec	
Assassin's Creed Shadows	Xbox Series X/S	March 20, 2025	Ubisoft Quebec	
Assassin's Creed Shadows	Switch 2	December 2, 2025	Ubisoft Quebec	
Just Dance 2026 Edition	PlayStation 5	October 14, 2025	Ubisoft Paris	
Just Dance 2026 Edition	Switch	October 14, 2025	Ubisoft Paris	
Just Dance 2026 Edition	Xbox Series X/S	October 14, 2025	Ubisoft Paris	
Anno 117: Pax Romana	PlayStation 5	November 13, 2025	Ubisoft Mainz	
Anno 117: Pax Romana	Windows	November 13, 2025	Ubisoft Mainz	
Anno 117: Pax Romana	Xbox Series X/S	November 13, 2025	Ubisoft Mainz	
Might and Magic Fates	Android	February 4, 2026	Ubisoft Paris Mobile, Immutable	
Might and Magic Fates	iOS	February 4, 2026	Ubisoft Paris Mobile, Immutable	
Might and Magic Fates	Windows	February 16, 2026	Ubisoft Paris Mobile, Immutable	
Rayman 30th Anniversary Edition	PlayStation 5	February 13, 2026	Ubisoft Montpellier, Digital Eclipse	
Rayman 30th Anniversary Edition	Switch	February 13, 2026	Ubisoft Montpellier, Digital Eclipse	
Rayman 30th Anniversary Edition	Windows	February 13, 2026	Ubisoft Montpellier, Digital Eclipse	
Rayman 30th Anniversary Edition	Xbox Series X/S	February 13, 2026	Ubisoft Montpellier, Digital Eclipse	
Tom Clancy's Rainbow Six Mobile	Android	February 23, 2026	Ubisoft Montreal	
Tom Clancy's Rainbow Six Mobile	iOS	February 23, 2026	Ubisoft Montreal	
Tom Clancy's The Division Resurgence	Android	March 31, 2026	Ubisoft Paris Mobile	
Tom Clancy's The Division Resurgence	iOS	March 31, 2026	Ubisoft Paris Mobile	
Tom Clancy's The Division Resurgence	Windows	August 5, 2026	Ubisoft Paris Mobile	
Morbid Metal	Windows	April 8, 2026 (early access)	Screen Juice	
Morbid Metal	Windows	TBA (full release)	Screen Juice	
Heroes of Might and Magic: Olden Era	Windows	April 30, 2026 (early access)	Unfrozen (Note: Co-published with Hooded Horse)	
Heroes of Might and Magic: Olden Era	Windows	TBA (full release)	Unfrozen	
Monopoly: Star Wars Heroes vs. Villains	PlayStation 5	June 30, 2026	Behaviour Interactive	
Monopoly: Star Wars Heroes vs. Villains	Switch	June 30, 2026	Behaviour Interactive	
Monopoly: Star Wars Heroes vs. Villains	Switch 2	June 30, 2026	Behaviour Interactive	
Monopoly: Star Wars Heroes vs. Villains	Windows	June 30, 2026	Behaviour Interactive	
Monopoly: Star Wars Heroes vs. Villains	Xbox Series X/S	June 30, 2026	Behaviour Interactive	
Assassin's Creed Black Flag Resynced	PlayStation 5	July 9, 2026	Ubisoft Singapore	
Assassin's Creed Black Flag Resynced	Windows	July 9, 2026	Ubisoft Singapore	
Assassin's Creed Black Flag Resynced	Xbox Series X/S	July 9, 2026	Ubisoft Singapore	
Just Dance: Decades of Hits	PlayStation 5	October 13, 2026	Ubisoft Paris	
Just Dance: Decades of Hits	Switch	October 13, 2026	Ubisoft Paris	
Just Dance: Decades of Hits	Xbox Series X/S	October 13, 2026	Ubisoft Paris	
Just Dance: Decades of Hits	Switch 2	November 10, 2026	Ubisoft Paris	
Rayman Legends Retold	PlayStation 5	December 3, 2026	Ubisoft Milan, Ubisoft Montpellier	
Rayman Legends Retold	Switch 2	December 3, 2026	Ubisoft Milan, Ubisoft Montpellier	
Rayman Legends Retold	Windows	December 3, 2026	Ubisoft Milan, Ubisoft Montpellier	
Rayman Legends Retold	Xbox Series X/S	December 3, 2026	Ubisoft Milan, Ubisoft Montpellier	
March of Giants	Windows	Mid-2027 (early access)	The March of Giants Team	
March of Giants	Windows	TBA (full release)	The March of Giants Team	
Heroes of Might and Magic III Remake	Windows	2027	Ubisoft Chengdu and Ubisoft Shanghai	
Rainbow Six Tactics	PlayStation 5	2027	Ubisoft Paris	
Rainbow Six Tactics	Windows	2027	Ubisoft Paris	
Rainbow Six Tactics	Xbox Series X/S	2027	Ubisoft Paris	
Assassin's Creed: Codename Hexe	TBA	TBA	Ubisoft Montreal	
Assassin's Creed: Codename Invictus	TBA	TBA	Ubisoft Montreal	
Assassin's Creed Jade	Android	TBA	TBA (Note: Published by Level Infinite)	
Assassin's Creed Jade	iOS	TBA	TBA	
Beyond Good and Evil 2	TBA	TBA	Ubisoft Montpellier	
Tom Clancy's The Division 3	TBA	TBA	Massive Entertainment	
Tom Clancy's Splinter Cell: Remake	TBA	TBA	Ubisoft Toronto	

== Cancelled games ==
Title	Proposed platform(s)	Cancellation date	Developer(s)	Ref.
Tom Clancy's Ghost Recon Frontline	PlayStation 4	July 21, 2022	Ubisoft Bucharest	
Tom Clancy's Ghost Recon Frontline	PlayStation 5	July 21, 2022	Ubisoft Bucharest	
Tom Clancy's Ghost Recon Frontline	Stadia	July 21, 2022	Ubisoft Bucharest	
Tom Clancy's Ghost Recon Frontline	Windows	July 21, 2022	Ubisoft Bucharest	
Tom Clancy's Ghost Recon Frontline	Xbox One	July 21, 2022	Ubisoft Bucharest	
Tom Clancy's Ghost Recon Frontline	Xbox Series X/S	July 21, 2022	Ubisoft Bucharest	
Tom Clancy's Splinter Cell VR	Meta Quest 2	July 21, 2022	Red Storm Entertainment	
Project Q	Windows	January 19, 2023	Ubisoft Bordeaux	
Tom Clancy's The Division Heartland	PlayStation 4	May 15, 2024	Red Storm Entertainment	
Tom Clancy's The Division Heartland	PlayStation 5	May 15, 2024	Red Storm Entertainment	
Tom Clancy's The Division Heartland	Windows	May 15, 2024	Red Storm Entertainment	
Tom Clancy's The Division Heartland	Xbox One	May 15, 2024	Red Storm Entertainment	
Tom Clancy's The Division Heartland	Xbox Series X/S	May 15, 2024	Red Storm Entertainment	
Gwen's Getaway	Android	October 23, 2024	RedLynx	
Gwen's Getaway	iOS	October 23, 2024	RedLynx	
Prince of Persia: The Sands of Time Remake	PlayStation 4	January 21, 2026	Ubisoft Montreal, Ubisoft Toronto	
Prince of Persia: The Sands of Time Remake	Windows	January 21, 2026	Ubisoft Montreal, Ubisoft Toronto	
Prince of Persia: The Sands of Time Remake	Xbox One	January 21, 2026	Ubisoft Montreal, Ubisoft Toronto	
Assassin's Creed Singularity	Android	January 21, 2026	Ubisoft Halifax	
Assassin's Creed Singularity	iOS	January 21, 2026	Ubisoft Halifax	
Assassin's Creed Singularity	Windows	January 21, 2026	Ubisoft Halifax	
Project Aether	Windows	January 21, 2026	Ubisoft Halifax	
Project Crest	PlayStation 5	January 21, 2026	Ubisoft Stockholm	
Project Crest	Windows	January 21, 2026	Ubisoft Stockholm	
Project Crest	Xbox Series X/S	January 21, 2026	Ubisoft Stockholm	
Project U / Project Pathfinder	Windows	January 21, 2026	Ubisoft Annecy	
Alterra	Windows	April 21, 2026	Ubisoft Montreal	
