= Just Dance: Decades of Hits =

2026 video game

- Developers: Ubisoft Paris; Ubisoft Pune; Ubisoft Shanghai; Ubisoft Kyiv; Ubisoft Bucharest
- Publisher: Ubisoft
- Series: Just Dance
- Engine: Unity
- Platforms: Nintendo Switch; Nintendo Switch 2; PlayStation 5; Xbox Series X/S
- Release: Switch, PS5, Xbox Series X/S; October 13, 2026; Switch 2; November 10, 2026
- Genre: Rhythm
- Modes: Single-player, multiplayer

Just Dance: Decades of Hits is a dance-controlled rhythm game developed and published by Ubisoft. It was first revealed on July 7, 2026, and was properly announced on September 10 as the eighteenth installment in the Just Dance series, and the fifth annual song pack for the Just Dance service which first debuted with Just Dance 2023 Edition. It was released on October 13, 2026, for Nintendo Switch, PlayStation 5, and Xbox Series X/S, and was released on November 10 for Nintendo Switch 2.

== Gameplay ==
As with the previous installments of the franchise, players must mimic the on-screen coach's choreography to a chosen song using the game's associated smartphone app. Nintendo Switch and Switch 2 players have the option to use the consoles' Joy-Con controllers, while the smartphone's camera can be used as a scoring method in single-player only.

Decades of Hits introduces a new game mode known as "Adventure Mode", in which the player travels across the six decades featured in the game's track listing. Each features various minigames, known as "Time Quiz", consisting of sorting cards and multiple-choice quizzes where players need to get an amount of right answers, alongside dance challenges where players need to reach a target percentage in a song to progress. The mode's story follows the character Lyra Gigavolt's journey for her father, Dr. Gigavolt, who is stuck in the year 2057. She uses her father's pocket watch to time travel through the six decades, each with its own dance styles, genres, cultures, and fashion styles, before rescuing him and returning to the present day.

Also new to the series is a five-player routine for "Wannabe" by Spice Girls, a song that has previously been featured in the first Just Dance game (2009) with a different routine.

== Soundtrack ==
The following songs appear on Just Dance: Decades of Hits:

Song	Artist	Year
"ABC" (Note: Appeared in Just Dance Kids with a different routine)	Groove Century (as made famous by The Jackson 5)	1970
"Across All Time"	Lyra Gigavolt	2026
"Around the World"	Daft Punk	1997
"Bye Bye Bye"	NSYNC	2000
"Celebration" (Note: Appeared in Just Dance Kids with a different routine)	Equinox Stars (as made famous by Kool & the Gang)	1980
"Coconut"	Smile.dk	1998
"Come and Get Your Love"	The Heartliners (as made famous by Redbone)	1974
"Crocodile Rock" (Note: Appeared in Just Dance Kids 2 with different audio and routine)	Elton John	1972
"Danza Kuduro"	Don Omar featuring Lucenzo	2010
"Drop Dead"	Olivia Rodrigo	2026
"Feel Good Inc."	Gorillaz	2005
"Give Me Everything"	Pitbull featuring Ne-Yo, Afrojack and Nayer	2011
"Hello"	Martin Solveig and Dragonette	2010
"Hi Lyfe"	Cult of Sound	2026
"Hot to Go!"	Chappell Roan	2023
"In Too Deep"	Sum 41	2001
"Into the Groove"	Madonna	1985
"It's Tricky" (Note: Appeared in The Hip Hop Dance Experience with a different routine)	Run-DMC	1986
"Jump"	Metal Russell (as made famous by Van Halen)	1984
"Just a Girl"	No Doubt	1995
"Mamma Mia" (Note: Appeared in ABBA: You Can Dance with a different routine)	ABBA	1975
"Manchild"	Sabrina Carpenter	2025
"Midnight Sun"	Zara Larsson	2025
"More & More"	Twice	2020
"No Scrubs"	TLC	1999
"Nuevayol"	Bad Bunny	2025
"Santa Tell Me"	Ariana Grande	2014
"Sing Hallelujah!"	Dr. Alban	1992
"Starlight"	The Supermen Lovers featuring Mani Hoffman	2001
"Stronger"	Britney Spears	2000
"Supersonic"	Lyra Gigavolt	2026
"The Singing Garden"	Hyacinth	2026
"Turn Down for What"	DJ Snake and Lil Jon	2013
"Uptown Girl"	Billy Joel	1983
"Wannabe" (Note: Appeared in Just Dance with a different routine)	Spice Girls	1996

== Reception ==
Reception

Aggregate score
Aggregator	Score
OpenCritic	50% recommend (Note: Based on 6 reviews.)
