= Just Dance VR =

2024 video game

- Developers: Ubisoft Paris; Soul Assembly
- Publisher: Ubisoft
- Series: Just Dance
- Engine: Unity
- Platforms: Meta Quest 2; Meta Quest 3; Meta Quest 3S; Meta Quest Pro
- Release: October 15, 2024
- Genre: Rhythm
- Modes: Single-player, multiplayer

Just Dance VR (Note: Also known in promotional material as Just Dance VR: Welcome to Dancity) is a virtual reality music rhythm game developed by Ubisoft Paris in association with Soul Assembly and published by Ubisoft. It was released for Meta Quest 2, Meta Quest 3, Meta Quest 3S, and Meta Quest Pro headsets on October 15, 2024, being a spin-off title to the Just Dance series.

It is the first Just Dance spin-off game in 8 years following Just Sing, which released in September 2016.

== Development ==
Plans for a Just Dance virtual reality game date back to 2016. A prototype was showcased at E3 2016, containing the songs "Same Old Love", "Born This Way" and "Chiwawa" from Just Dance 2016, alongside "Problem" from Just Dance 2015, adapted to 360-degree versions. The prototype was referred to as Just Dance VR by Ubisoft. Although it was said to be releasing the following year, news on the game went silent after the event and the prototype was never made public. It is unclear whether or not it served as the basis for the final game.

In September 2022, the game was reannounced as a Pico 4 exclusive, aiming for a 2023 release. However, news went silent once again throughout most of 2023. In November of that year, it was announced that development would continue with a new partner after major lay offs at Pico and disappointing sales from Pico 4 headsets. The game was later featured at Ubisoft Forward in June 2024, where it was revealed that the game would be a Meta Quest exclusive.

The game uses the Unity engine, the same engine used in mainline Just Dance titles since Just Dance 2023 Edition.

Development focused on creating immersion and interaction, adapting songs from previous entries in the series into virtual reality experiences. This included adding left-hand scoring, in contrast to the series' games traditionally scoring only through right-hand movement, and reworking the user interface into a 360° VR setting. All backgrounds are rendered in-game within the 360° viewing angle, similar to mainline Just Dance installments prior to Just Dance 2016. Additionally, the game shares user interface elements with Just Dance 2023 Edition. Customizable avatars and a social hub were also added with the purpose of allowing players a more fun experience by interacting with each other.

== Gameplay ==
As with mainline and previous spin-off entries of the franchise, players must mimic the on-screen coach's choreography to a chosen song, in this case utilizing the headset's Touch, Touch Pro and Touch Plus controllers respectively.

All songs are taken from previous games in the series, with the exception of "Centuries" which acted as an exclusive track until it was released on Just Dance+ on February 18, 2025.

Players can access two distinct 3D social spaces; the Apartment and Dancity. In the former, users can see any trophies they have earned, customize their avatar, and interact with glowsticks and a basketball hoop. And in the latter, they can invite other users to multiplayer sessions, engage in freestyle dance battles and compete in throwing a ball in a hoop. In both, they can choose which song to play.

Within a song, a maximum of six players can dance simultaneously. Haptic feedback such as hand trails, pulse effects and clapping can be done while dancing.

== Soundtrack ==
The following songs appear on Just Dance VR:

Song	Artist	Year	Original game
"After Party"	Banx & Ranx featuring Zach Zoya	2023	Just Dance 2024 Edition
"A Little Party Never Killed Nobody (All We Got)"	Fergie featuring Q-Tip & GoonRock	2013	Just Dance 2019
"Bad Liar"	Selena Gomez	2017	Just Dance 2018
"Beauty and a Beat"	Justin Bieber featuring Nicki Minaj	2012	Just Dance 4
"Born This Way"	Lady Gaga	2011	Just Dance 2016
"Blinding Lights"	The Weeknd	2019	Just Dance 2021
"Call Me Maybe"	Carly Rae Jepsen	2011	Just Dance 4
"Centuries"	Fall Out Boy	2014	Just Dance VR
"Dark Horse"	Katy Perry	2013	Just Dance 2015
"Don't Stop Me Now"	Queen	1978	Just Dance 2017
"Hollaback Girl"	Gwen Stefani	2005	Just Dance+
"How You Like That"	BLACKPINK	2020	Just Dance 2024 Edition
"I Will Survive"	Gloria Gaynor	1978	Just Dance 2014
"Jai Ho! (You Are My Destiny)"	A. R. Rahman and The Pussycat Dolls featuring Nicole Scherzinger	2009	Just Dance 2
"Lights"	Ellie Goulding	2011	Just Dance 2016
"Love Me Again"	John Newman	2013	Just Dance 2015
"Starships"	Nicki Minaj	2012	Just Dance 2014
"Stop This Fire"	Nius	2024	Just Dance 2025 Edition
"Taki Taki"	DJ Snake featuring Selena Gomez, Ozuna and Cardi B	2018	Just Dance 2020
"Thank U, Next"	Ariana Grande	2018	Just Dance+
"Therefore I Am"	Billie Eilish	2020	Just Dance 2023 Edition
"Tusa"	Karol G and Nicki Minaj	2019	Just Dance Unlimited
"Volar"	Lele Pons featuring Susan Diaz and Victor Cardenas	2020	Just Dance 2021
"Wake Me Up" (Note: Stylized in-game as "Wake Me Up!")	Avicii featuring Aloe Blacc	2013	Just Dance 2014
"Wannabe"	Itzy	2020	Just Dance 2023 Edition

== Reception ==
Just Dance VR received mixed-to-positive reviews from critics. Hamish Hector of TechRadar Gaming described the track list as "out of date" compared to Just Dance 2025 Edition, which released on the same day. He also criticized how the game didn't take full advantage of its 360-VR stages, alongside the lack of a mixed reality mode and a poor scoring system. Giovanni Colantonio of Digital Trends gave the game a more positive outlook, praising the series' smooth transition into a virtual reality format, while still criticizing the unclear UI, the small song selection, and the possibility of hitting real-life objects while dancing. Henry Stockdale of UploadVR commented positively on the social hub and the songs' environments, while the small song selection and the limited amount of things to do in Dancity were his main complaints.
