= Just Dance Kids =

Just Dance Kids may refer to:

- Just Dance Kids (2010 video game), known as Dance Juniors in Europe, a 2010 dancing video game
  - Just Dance Kids (soundtrack), the soundtrack of the game
- Just Dance Kids 2, known as Just Dance Kids in Europe, a 2011 dancing video game
- Just Dance Kids 2014, a 2013 dancing video game
