= Just Dance: Greatest Hits =

2012 video game

Just Dance: Best Of / Greatest Hits
- PAL box art (Wii)
- Developers: Ubisoft Paris (Wii); Ubisoft Montreal (Xbox 360)
- Publisher: Ubisoft
- Series: Just Dance
- Platforms: Wii, Xbox 360
- Release: Wii: AU: March 29, 2012; EU: March 30, 2012; NA: June 26, 2012; Xbox 360: AU: June 21, 2012; EU: June 22, 2012; NA: June 26, 2012
- Genres: Music, rhythm
- Modes: Single player, Multiplayer

Just Dance: Greatest Hits (known as Just Dance: Best Of for the PAL Wii) is a music rhythm game released on the Wii and Xbox 360. It is part of the Just Dance video game series published by Ubisoft originally on the Wii. The game includes songs from Just Dance, Just Dance 2, and Just Dance 3, with the latter game used as its basis. The game was released for PAL Wii as Just Dance: Best Of with 25 songs on March 29, 2012 in Australia and March 30, 2012 in Europe, and for Xbox 360 and NTSC Wii as Just Dance: Greatest Hits with 35 songs on June 21, 2012 in Australia, June 22, 2012 in Europe and June 26, 2012 in North America.

== Gameplay ==
Gameplay of the track "Girlfriend" in Just Dance: Greatest Hits

Like the previous games in the Just Dance main series, up to four players can play to mirror on-screen dance choreography from many different songs, as they are judged on their ability to follow a dance routine to a chosen song. Returning features in the game include Non-Stop Shuffle, Speed Shuffle, Simon Says, Shout Out, Just Sweat and Just Create (Xbox 360 only).

== Critical reception ==
Alaina Yee of Official Xbox Magazine said, "This game is all about silly fun." Adam Dileva of XboxAddict said the game "really offers nothing new to you unless you really want to see if you can do the moves properly with Kinect now being able to see how you're 'actually' dancing."

== Track listing ==
Both games consist of some tracks from Just Dance, most tracks from Just Dance 2, and 3 tracks from Just Dance 3.

Song	Artist	Year	Original game	Best Of	Greatest Hits
"Acceptable in the 80s"	Calvin Harris	2007	Just Dance	Yes	Yes
"Airplanes"	B.o.B featuring Hayley Williams	2010	Just Dance 3	Yes	Yes
"Alright"	Supergrass	1995	Just Dance 2	Yes	Yes
"Baby Don't Stop Now"	Anja	2011	Just Dance 3	Yes	Yes
"Baby Girl" (Note: The song has to be unlocked with a secret code on the D-pad, which only works on the NTSC Wii version. It is not available on the Xbox 360 version of the game.)	Reggaeton	2009	Just Dance 2	Yes	
"Barbie Girl"	Countdown Dee's Hit Explosion (as made famous by Aqua)	1997	Just Dance 2	Yes	Yes
"Body Movin' (Fatboy Slim Remix)"	Beastie Boys	1998	Just Dance 2	No	Yes
"Cosmic Girl"	Jamiroquai	1996	Just Dance 2	Yes	No
"Crazy in Love"	Studio Musicians (as made famous by Beyoncé featuring Jay Z)	2003	Just Dance 2	No	Yes
"Dagomba"	Sorcerer	2010	Just Dance 2	Yes	Yes
"Dare"	Gorillaz	2005	Just Dance	No	Yes
"Down by the Riverside"	The Reverend Horatio Duncan and Amos Sweets	1927	Just Dance 2	Yes	No
"Eye of the Tiger"	Survivor	1982	Just Dance	No	Yes
"Fame"	Irene Cara (credited as In The Style of Irene Cara)	1980	Just Dance	Yes	Yes
"Firework"	Katy Perry	2010	Just Dance 2	Yes	Yes
"Futebol Crazy"	The World Cup Girls	2009	Just Dance 2	Yes	No
"Girlfriend"	Avril Lavigne	2007	Just Dance 2	No	Yes
"Hey Ya!"	Outkast	2003	Just Dance 2	Yes	Yes
"Hot 'n Cold (Chick Version)" (Note: Credited in the Wii version as "Hot 'n Cold" and the Xbox 360 version as "Hot 'n Cold (Rock Version)")	Katy Perry	2008	Just Dance	No	Yes
"I Like to Move It (Radio Mix)"	Groove Century (credited as Reel 2 Real featuring The Mad Stuntman)	1993	Just Dance	Yes	Yes
"It's Raining Men"	The Weather Girls	1982	Just Dance 2	No	Yes
"Jai Ho! (You Are My Destiny)"	A. R. Rahman & The Pussycat Dolls featuring Nicole Scherzinger	2009	Just Dance 2	Yes	Yes
"Jin-Go-Lo-Ba"	Fatboy Slim	2004	Just Dance	No	Yes
"Jump"	Studio Allstars (as made famous by Kris Kross)	1992	Just Dance 2	No	Yes
"Jump in the Line (Shake, Senora)"	The Sunlight Shakers (as made famous by Harry Belafonte)	1961	Just Dance 2	No	Yes
"Katti Kalandal"	Bollywood	1980	Just Dance 2	Yes	
"Kung Fu Fighting (Dave Ruffy / Mark Wallis Remix)"	Carl Douglas	1974	Just Dance 2	Yes	Yes
"Mambo No. 5 (A Little Bit of Monika)"	Lou Bega (credited as The Lemon Cubes)	1999	Just Dance 2	Yes	No
"Move Your Feet"	Junior Senior	2003	Just Dance 2	Yes	No
"Mugsy Baloney"	Charleston	1924	Just Dance 2	Yes	No
"Only Girl (In the World)"	Rihanna	2010	Just Dance 3	Yes	Yes
"Pon de Replay"	Rihanna	2005	Just Dance 2	No	Yes
"Proud Mary"	Ike and Tina Turner	1971	Just Dance 2	No	Yes
"Rasputin"	Boney M.	1978	Just Dance 2	Yes	Yes
"Ring My Bell"	Anita Ward	1979	Just Dance	No	Yes
"Satisfaction (Isak Original Extended)"	Benny Benassi	2003	Just Dance 2	Yes	Yes
"Step by Step"	New Kids on the Block	1990	Just Dance	No	Yes
"The Power"	Snap!	1990	Just Dance 2	No	Yes
"Tik Tok"	Ke$ha	2009	Just Dance 2	No	Yes
"Toxic"	The Hit Crew (as made famous by Britney Spears)	2004	Just Dance 2	Yes	Yes
"U Can't Touch This"	Groove Century (as made famous by MC Hammer)	1990	Just Dance	Yes	Yes
"Viva Las Vegas"	Elvis Presley	1964	Just Dance 2	No	Yes
"Who Let the Dogs Out?"	The Sunlight Shakers (as made famous by Baha Men) (Note: The original version was used in the Xbox 360 version.)	2000	Just Dance	No	Yes
Number of songs Included (Wii)				25	37
Number of songs Included (Xbox 360)				N/A	35
