= Just Dance: Disney Party =

2012 video game

- North American Wii cover art
- Developer: Land Ho!
- Publisher: Ubisoft
- Series: Just Dance
- Platforms: Xbox 360, Wii
- Release: NA: October 23, 2012; AU: October 25, 2012; EU: October 26, 2012
- Genres: Music, Rhythm, Dance
- Modes: Single-player, Multiplayer

Just Dance: Disney Party is a game in the Just Dance series developed by Japanese studio Land Ho! in association with Disney Interactive Studios and published by Ubisoft for the Wii and Kinect for Xbox 360 as a spin-off title of the Just Dance Kids series. The game was released worldwide in October 2012. The game is similar to Just Dance Kids 2 with the live action dancers, the game modes (Team High Scores, Freeze & Shake, Balloon Pop), and the animated score icons, except it includes a duet mode, where in the first two Just Dance Kids games, all of the songs had only the dancer in the middle of the screen to follow. In addition, all the songs are the original versions, not covers. A sequel, Just Dance: Disney Party 2, was released on October 20, 2015.

== Gameplay ==
The gameplay is identical to the other games in Ubisoft's franchise, Just Dance. Players are required to perform specific dance moves in time with the music, following a routine indicated on-screen and performed by live dancers. If the player performs well, by dancing accurately and in-time, their score will build and a rating out of 4 stars is obtained upon completion of the track.

== Track list ==
The track list consists of a total of 25 songs.

Song	Artist (English)	TV show/film	Year
"The Bare Necessities" (Note: Can be played in different languages.)	Phil Harris and Bruce Reitherman	The Jungle Book	1967
"Be Our Guest"	Cast of Beauty and the Beast	Beauty and the Beast	1991
"Bibbidi-Bobbidi-Boo"	Verna Felton	Cinderella	1950
"Calling All the Monsters"	China Anne McClain	A.N.T. Farm	2011
"Everything Is Not What It Seems"	Selena Gomez	Wizards of Waverly Place	2007
"Ev'rybody Wants to Be a Cat"	Cast of The Aristocats	The Aristocats	1970
"Fly to Your Heart"	Selena Gomez	Tinker Bell	2008
"Following the Leader"	Paul Collins, Tommy Luske, and Tony Butala	Peter Pan	1953
"Hang in There Baby"	Bridgit Mendler	Good Luck Charlie	2010
"Hawaiian Roller Coaster Ride"	Kamehameha Schools Children's Chorus and Mark Keali'i Ho'omalu	Lilo & Stitch	2002
"Hey Jessie"	Debby Ryan	Jessie	2011
"Hoedown Throwdown"	Miley Cyrus	Hannah Montana: The Movie	2009
"I Thought I Lost You"	Miley Cyrus and John Travolta	Bolt	2008
"I've Got a Dream"	Mandy Moore, Brad Garrett, Tangled Ensemble, Zachary Levi, and Jeffrey Tambor	Tangled	2010
"It's a Small World"	The Disneyland Children's Chorus	It's a Small World	1964
"The Muppet Show Theme"	The Muppets	The Muppets	2011
"Shake It Up"	Selena Gomez	Shake It Up	2010
"S.I.M.P (Squirrels In My Pants)"	2 Guys n the Parque	Phineas and Ferb	2008
"Something That I Want"	Grace Potter	Tangled	2010
"Supercalifragilisticexpialidocious"	Cast of Mary Poppins	Mary Poppins	1964
"That's How You Know"	Amy Adams	Enchanted	2007
"This Is Me"	Demi Lovato feat. Joe Jonas	Camp Rock	2008
"Twist My Hips (Watch Me)"	Tim James and Nevermind	Shake It Up	2010
"Under the Sea"	Cast of Disney's The Little Mermaid	The Little Mermaid	1989
"We're All in This Together"	Cast of High School Musical	High School Musical	2006

== Cast ==
Actress Haley Lu Richardson was featured in "Hey Jessie" as a dancer.
