= Just Dance 2025 Edition =

2024 video game

- Developer: Ubisoft Paris
- Publisher: Ubisoft
- Series: Just Dance
- Engine: Unity
- Platforms: Nintendo Switch; PlayStation 5; Xbox Series X/S
- Release: October 15, 2024
- Genre: Rhythm
- Modes: Single-player; Multiplayer

Just Dance 2025 Edition is a dance rhythm game developed and published by Ubisoft. It was revealed on June 18, 2024, during the Nintendo Direct June 2024 presentation as the sixteenth installment in the series, and the third annual song pack after its predecessors Just Dance 2023 Edition and 2024 Edition, in celebration of the series' fifteenth anniversary. The game was released on October 15, 2024, for Nintendo Switch, PlayStation 5, and Xbox Series X/S.

== Gameplay ==
As with the previous installments of the franchise, players must mimic the on-screen coach's choreography to a chosen song using the game's associated smartphone app (Nintendo Switch players have the option to use the console's Joy-Con controllers). New to the Just Dance hub for this installment are purchasable DLC song packs, with each pack containing six songs from the Just Dance+ catalogue. These song packs require access to any of the Edition annual song packs, allowing players to play these songs without a Just Dance+ subscription. A pack featuring five songs by Ariana Grande comes with the game. Camera scoring, which remains in beta, is extended to support all songs in 2025 Edition.

== Soundtrack ==
The following songs appear on Just Dance 2025 Edition:

Song	Artist	Year
"Bang Bang! (My Neurodivergent Anthem)"	Galantis	2023
"Basket Case" (Note: Available for free on Just Dance+ for a limited time from August 20 to September 3, 2024, as part of the early access to the game.)	Green Day	1994
"Break Up with Your Girlfriend, I'm Bored"	Ariana Grande	2019
"Calabria 2007"	Enur featuring Natasja	2007
"Chattahoochee"	Alan Jackson	1993
"Control Response" (Note: Tie in to Hyper Scape)	Hyper	2020
"Dubidubidu (Chipi Chipi Chapa Chapa)"	Christell	2003
"Espresso"	Sabrina Carpenter	2024
"Exes"	Tate McRae	2023
"Halloween's Here"	The Just Dance Band	2024
"In the Shadows"	The Rasmus	2003
"In Your Eyes (Remix)"	The Weeknd featuring Doja Cat	2020
"Lovin on Me"	Jack Harlow	2023
"Lunch"	Billie Eilish	2024
"Mi Gente lo Siente"	Don Elektron and Gotopo	2024
"Move Your Body"	The Sunlight Shakers	2024
"My Heart Will Go On"	Celine Dion	1997
"One Last Time"	Ariana Grande	2015
"Padam Padam"	Kylie Minogue	2023
"Paint the Town Red"	Doja Cat	2023
"Party in the U.S.A."	Miley Cyrus	2009
"Payphone"	Maroon 5 featuring Wiz Khalifa	2012
"Pink Venom"	Blackpink	2022
"Play Date”	Melanie Martinez	2015
"Poker Face"	Lady Gaga	2008
"Sleigh Ride"	Mrs. Claus and the Elves (as made famous by The Ronettes)	1963
"Something I Can Feel"	Mandy Harvey	2022
"SpongeBob's Birthday" (Note: Tie in to SpongeBob SquarePants in celebration of the show's 25th anniversary)	Groove Century	2024
"Stop This Fire"	Nius	2024
"Sunlight"	The Just Dance Band	2024
"Sweet Melody"	Little Mix	2020
"The Boy Is Mine"	Ariana Grande	2024
"The Lion Sleeps Tonight (Wimoweh)"	The Tokens	1961
"Training Season"	Dua Lipa	2024
"Unstoppable"	Sia	2016
"Vogue"	Madonna	1990
"We Can't Be Friends (Wait for Your Love)"	Ariana Grande	2024
"Whenever, Wherever"	Shakira	2001
"Yeah!"	Usher featuring Lil Jon	2004
"Yes, And?"	Ariana Grande	2024
"You Love Who You Love"	Zara Larsson	2024

=== Just Dance+ ===
Just Dance+ continues to be offered on 2025 Edition, offering recently ported songs from previous Just Dance games, as well as songs exclusive to the service.

Songs exclusive to the service include:

Song	Artist	Year	Release date
"Pigstep" (Note: Tie in to Minecraft in celebration of the game's 15th anniversary)	Lena Raine, Minecraft, and Dancing Bros.	2024	December 11, 2024
"Apple" (Note: Also included in the Fitness Song Pack)	Charli XCX	2024	January 28, 2025
"Feel So Close"	Calvin Harris	2011	January 28, 2025
"I Like the Way You Kiss Me"	Artemas	2024	January 28, 2025
"Centuries"	Fall Out Boy	2014	February 18, 2025
"La Bachata" (Note: Also included in the Fiesta Latina Song Pack)	Manuel Turizo	2022	April 8, 2025
"Si Antes Te Hubiera Conocido"	Karol G	2024	April 8, 2025
"Soltera"	Shakira	2024	April 8, 2025
"Material Girl"	Madonna	1985	May 20, 2025
"TikiTaka"	Golazul	2025	July 2, 2025

== Reception ==
Reception

Aggregate scores
Aggregator	Score
Metacritic	(NS) 71/100 (PS5) 79/100
OpenCritic	43% recommend

Review score
Publication	Score
Hardcore Gamer	3.5/5

According to the review aggregation website Metacritic, the PlayStation 5 version of Just Dance 2025 Edition received generally favorable reviews from critics, while the Nintendo Switch version received "mixed or average" reviews from critics. Fellow review aggregator OpenCritic assessed that the game received fair approval, being recommended by 43% of critics.
