= Just Dance Wii 2 =

2012 video game

- Developer: Ubisoft Paris
- Publisher: Nintendo
- Producer: Ubisoft
- Series: Just Dance
- Platform: Wii
- Release: JP: July 26, 2012
- Genres: Music, rhythm
- Modes: Single-player, multiplayer

Just Dance Wii 2 (Note: Known in Japan as JUST DANCE(ジャストダンス) Wii 2) is a 2012 dance rhythm game developed by Ubisoft Paris and published by Nintendo. It is part of the Just Dance video game series published by Ubisoft and the second Japanese installment of the series. It was announced in a Nintendo Direct on 21 April 2012, and released for the Wii system on 26 July 2012 in Japan.

== Gameplay ==
The game is based on Just Dance 3, with the user interface and features are largely identical to that said game, but the game removes a few features and adds a Dance Dojo mode, which allows the player to study some or all of a routine. Players can also choose between the full version or the short version.

== Track list ==
The game features 35 songs, including 20 Japanese songs.

Song	Artist	Year
"Age Age Every Knight"	DJ Ozma	2006
"...Baby One More Time" (Note: Previously featured on Just Dance 3)	The Girly Team (as made famous by Britney Spears)	1998
"Beautiful Liar"	Countdown Mix Masters (as made famous by Beyoncé and Shakira)	2007
"Bo Peep Bo Peep (Japanese Version)"	T-ara	2011
"Body & Soul"	Speed	1997
"California Gurls"	Katy Perry featuring Snoop Dogg	2010
"Dynamite"	Taio Cruz	2010
"Girlfriend" (Note: Previously featured on Just Dance 2)	Avril Lavigne	2007
"Go Go Summer!"	Kara	2011
"Gonna Make You Sweat (Everybody Dance Now)"	Sweat Invaders (as made famous by C+C Music Factory featuring Freedom Williams)	1990
"I'm Your Man"	2PM	2011
"Independent Woman"	Ai	2012
"Jet Coaster Love"	Kara	2011
"Joyful"	Megumi Tatsumi (as made famous by Ikimonogakari)	2009
"Lollipop"	Mika	2007
"Lovers Again"	Exile	2007
"Mamasita"	Latino Sunset	2001
"Maru Maru Mori Mori!"	Kaoru to Tomoki, Tamani Mook	2011
"Mickey Mouse March (Family Parapara Version)"	Cutie Mommy	2005
"Only Girl (In the World)" (Note: Previously featured as a Target/Zellers exclusive track on Just Dance 3)	Rihanna	2010
"Party Rock Anthem"	LMFAO featuring Lauren Bennett and GoonRock	2011
"Pon Pon Pon"	Kyary Pamyu Pamyu	2011
"Pop Star"	Ms. Ooja (as made famous by Ken Hirai)	2005
"Promiscuous"	Nelly Furtado featuring Timbaland	2006
"Pump It"	The Black Eyed Peas	2006
"Ride on Time"	MAX	1998
"Rising Sun"	Exile	2011
"Samishii Nettaigyo"	Wink	1989
"She's Got Me Dancing"	Tommy Sparks	2009
"Spectronizer" (Note: Lyrics are displayed in Japanese instead of Romaji.)	Sentai Express	2011
"Suirenka"	Shōnan no Kaze	2007
"Tik Tok"	Kesha	2009
"We Can Fly"	Happiness	2012
"We Can't Stop The Music"	Da Pump	1999
"Yeah! Meccha Holiday"	Aya Matsuura	2002

== Reception ==
Reception

Review score
Publication	Score
Famitsu	33/40

Famitsu gave the game a score of 33/40, with three out of four reviewers giving it an 8 and the other reviewer giving it a 9.
