= Dubidubidu =

2003 song by Christell

- 2024 reissue cover art

Song by Christell

from the album Christell
- Language: Spanish
- Released: 2003
- Length: 3:46
- Label: Warner Music Chile
- Songwriter: Claudio Prado
- Producer: Jaime Román

Music video
- Oriignal performance of "Dubidubidu" on YouTube

"Dubidubidu" is a Spanish-language song first performed by Chilean singer Christell in 2003 when she was five years old. It desribes Christell inviting her friends to her house in a toy car. At release, the song was moderately successful in Chile, but only started gaining popularity in Japan, Korea, and later worldwide, due to its use in cat meme videos from late 2023 to 2024. Due to the song's relative obscurity outside of Chile before the meme, it is also known by its lyric "Chipi Chipi Chapa Chapa". (Note: Japanese: チピチピチャパチャパ) Some of its lyrics have also been misinterpreted, and Christell only received attention for singing "Dubidubidu" after posting her original performance on TikTok. Christell has responded positively to the meme, and encouraged it to continue.

== Conception and release ==
"Dubidubidu" is a Spanish-language song first performed by Chilean singer Christell in 2003 on the reality television competition series Rojo fama contra fama when she was five years old. "Dubidubidu" was written by Claudio Prado and produced by Jaime Román. Christell is listed as the main artist for singing it.

Christell commented in an interview that Román told Prado that he wanted to make a song about her inviting her friends to her house in a toy car, and the composer wrote the song around this idea. "Dubidubidu" was included on her debut album Christell. "Dubidubidu" was initially a hit in Chile, but its popularity later fell.

== Resurgence ==
In early 2023, two decades after the release of "Dubidubidu", a meme video featuring an animated GIF of a cat moving from side to side emerged, which started in the United States and gradually spread to Asia. Another meme had previously been made of a character dancing to the rhythm of the song. In Japan, it became known by its lyric "Chipi Chipi Chapa Chapa" . The South Korean singer Beomgyu uploaded a TikTok video of himself dancing to the rhythm of "Dubidubidu", which helped spread the song to South Korea. Christell appeared on the Warner Music Japan Instagram account, thanking people for the positive reception to her song. In the United States, the lyrics "mágico mi dubidubi" were misinterpreted as "magic pony". The misconception about the lyrics still existed in November 2024, when Christell sang "Dubidubidu" alongside a South Korean singer during a visit to Seoul. She explained that she visited Seoul specifically because of the success of "Dubidubidu" there.

On 15 January 2024, the song became the top song on Spotify's weekly viral chart in Japan, staying at first place for two days. That February, the song also became a hit in Germany, Finland, and South Korea, as well as being in first place in Japan again. In October 2024, TVN announced that "Dubidubidu" would be featured on Just Dance in 2025. Following the social media resurgence, Christell appeared at the Premios Pulsar awards in 2025, where she presented the award for the public artist category. "Dubidubidu" was nominated for the MTV MIAW Awards in 2024.

Christell responded to the meme positively, hoping that it would help her gain traction on social media, and encouraging people to continue making videos. She expressed gratitude at the song's popularity in South Korea, because she is interested in Korean and Asian culture. Since "Dubidubidu" was not on Spotify when the meme was created, TikTok users did not know she was the singer until she uploaded her original 2003 Rojo performance to TikTok. She did not write the song, as she was five years old at the time. This means that she received little money from the song's resurgence as a meme, since most of it went to the writer and producer.

=== Critical reception ===
"Dubidubidu" received minimal reception. Several publications called it "catchy", (Note: Spanish: pegajosa) and Yahoo Japan called it unforgettable. (Note: Japanese: 耳から離れない, lit. transl. it won't leave your ears) TVN praised it for being a "mega hit". (Note: Spanish: megaéxito)
