= Just Dance 2023 Edition =

2022 video game

- Developers: Ubisoft Paris; Ubisoft Pune; Ubisoft Shanghai; Ubisoft Mumbai
- Publisher: Ubisoft
- Series: Just Dance
- Engine: Unity
- Platforms: Nintendo Switch; PlayStation 5; Xbox Series X/S
- Release: November 22, 2022
- Genre: Rhythm
- Modes: Single-player; Multiplayer

Just Dance 2023 Edition is a 2022 dance rhythm game developed and published by Ubisoft. It was unveiled on September 10, 2022 during the Ubisoft Forward September 2022 web presentation as the fourteenth main installment of the series. It marks a new release form for the series, switching to a live service format with annual downloadable content song packs. The game was released on November 22, 2022, for Nintendo Switch, PlayStation 5, and Xbox Series X/S. It was also planned for release on Stadia, but that port of the game was cancelled due to the service's shutdown on January 18, 2023.

== Gameplay ==
As with the previous installments of the franchise, players must mimic the on-screen coach’s choreography to a chosen song using the game's associated smartphone app (Nintendo Switch players have the option to use the console's Joy-Con controllers). 2023 Edition was not released for Xbox One and PlayStation 4, thereby dropping support for Kinect, PlayStation Camera, and PlayStation Move.

=== Features ===
User interface of Just Dance 2023 Edition

The game features an updated and redesigned user interface, which emulates those seen on streaming services, such as Netflix, Hulu, Disney+, HBO Max, Paramount+ and Peacock, all within a single Just Dance hub, serving as the home for the game and future installments of the series. It is also the first Just Dance title to be developed using the Unity engine, as opposed to Ubisoft's in-house UbiArt Framework which had been in use since Just Dance 2014. A new online multiplayer feature is added, where up to six players can join a private group with cross-play support at launch, with the Xbox Series X/S version later being supported. Dancer cards, an in-game tool to express what the player was doing in-game, received a major overhaul, with avatars now being pictures of the coaches instead of their heads, and emotes are added to show how the player feels after each song. Score feedback animations can now be customized and are a toggleable option. Victory celebrations are a new addition, used for when the player finishes the song in single player or wins the song in multiplayer. Cross-progression is a new feature to the Just Dance series, allowing players to progress through multiple consoles. Furthermore, the "Beat Vibrations" function, which has been exclusive to the Nintendo Switch version of previous installments, has been added to the Xbox Series X/S and PlayStation 5 versions.

On October 9, "Workout Mode", a mode designed for exercise, and "Challenge Mode", an online mode where a player attempts to beat a pre-set higher score from another player, are added as part of the 2024 Edition Celebration Event.

== Story mode ==
2023 Edition includes a story mode-based playlist, a first in the series, titled "Enter the Danceverses". It tells the story of a woman named Sara, who is transported from the real world to a series of worlds collectively known as the "Danceverses" by a man named Wanderlust. The two must stop the evil witch Night Swan from conquering the Danceverses. They recruit a team of expert dancers—Brezziana, Mihaly and Jack Rose (Night Swan's son)—and defeat Night Swan and her mind-controlled soldiers in a dance battle. The soldiers are freed, but Night Swan escapes. The group celebrates before Wanderlust sends Sara back to the real world.

A follow-up to this story, titled "Dance with the Swan", is part of 2024 Edition.

== Soundtrack ==
The following songs appear on Just Dance 2023 Edition:

Song	Artist	Year
"Anything I Do"	CLiQ featuring Ms Banks and Alika	2018
"As It Was"	Harry Styles	2022
"Boy with Luv"	BTS featuring Halsey	2019
"Bring Me to Life"	Evanescence	2003
"Can't Stop the Feeling!" (Note: Also part of the "Enter the Danceverses" playlist)	Justin Timberlake	2016
"Danger! High Voltage"	Electric Six	2002
"Disco Inferno"	The Trammps	1976
"Drivers License"	Olivia Rodrigo	2021
"Dynamite"	BTS	2020
"Good Ones"	Charli XCX	2021
"Heat Waves"	Glass Animals	2020
"I Knew You Were Trouble (Taylor's Version)"	Taylor Swift	2021
"If You Wanna Party"	The Just Dancers	2022
"Jamais Lâcher" (Note: Only available as a French-exclusive track on the soundtrack)	Michou	2022
"Locked Out of Heaven"	Bruno Mars	2012
"Love Me Land"	Zara Larsson	2020
"Magic"	Kylie Minogue	2020
"Majesty"	Apashe featuring Wasiu	2018
"Million Dollar Baby"	Ava Max	2022
"More" (Note: Tie in to League of Legends)	K/DA featuring Madison Beer, (G)I-dle, Lexie Liu, Jaira Burns and Seraphine	2020
"Numb"	Linkin Park	2003
"Physical"	Dua Lipa	2020
"Playground"	Bea Miller	2021
"Psycho"	Red Velvet	2019
"Radioactive"	Imagine Dragons	2012
"Rather Be"	Clean Bandit featuring Jess Glynne	2014
"Sissy That Walk"	RuPaul	2014
"Stay"	The Kid Laroi and Justin Bieber	2021
"Sweet but Psycho"	Ava Max	2018
"Telephone"	Lady Gaga featuring Beyoncé	2010
"Therefore I Am"	Billie Eilish	2020
"Top of the World" (Note: Tie in to Lyle, Lyle, Crocodile, with the titular character being the coach of the song.)	Shawn Mendes	2022
"Toxic" (Note: Appeared in Just Dance 2 with a different routine, which appears in the game as an alternate routine)	Britney Spears	2004
"Walking on Sunshine"	Top Culture (as made famous by Katrina and the Waves)	1985
"Wannabe"	Itzy	2020
"Watch Out for This (Bumaye)"	Major Lazer featuring Busy Signal, The Flexican and FS Green	2013
"We Don't Talk About Bruno"	Cast of Disney's Encanto	2021
"Witch"	Apashe featuring Alina Pash	2021
"Woman"	Doja Cat	2021
"Wouldn't It Be Nice"	The Sunlight Shakers (as made famous by The Beach Boys)	1966
"Zooby Doo"	Tigermonkey	2016

=== Just Dance+ ===
Just Dance+ is a new subscription service launched alongside 2023 Edition. Similar to Just Dance Unlimited from the previous seven games, it offers subscription-based access to a streaming library of songs (150 songs at launch) from previous Just Dance games alongside new exclusive tracks. Songs ported from previous Just Dance games, as well as songs exclusive to the service, are added through frequent updates.

Songs exclusive to the service include:

Song	Artist	Year	Release date
"Farfalle" (Note: World Tour Event) (Note: Also available as an Italian-exclusive track on the soundtrack)	Sangiovanni	2022	January 6, 2023
"Ubu Love" (Note: Also available as a Japanese-exclusive track on the soundtrack)	Naniwa Danshi	2021	January 6, 2023
"Woman" ("VIP" alternate routine) (Note: Also available as a Canadian-exclusive routine on the game)	Doja Cat	2021	January 12, 2023
"Vleugels" (Note: Also available as a Benelux region-exclusive track on the soundtrack)	K3	2022	January 12, 2023
"Stay" ("VIP" alternate routine) (Note: Also available as a Korean-exclusive routine on the game)	The Kid Laroi and Justin Bieber	2021	January 19, 2023
"ABC (Nicer)" (Note: Season 1: Lover Coaster) (Note: Free for a limited time from February 27 to March 9)	Gayle	2021	February 27, 2023
"Thank U, Next"	Ariana Grande	2018	March 9, 2023
"Wet Tennis" (Note: Free for a limited time from March 30 to April 6)	Sofi Tukker	2022	March 16, 2023
"Provenza"	Karol G	2022	March 30, 2023
"About Damn Time"	Lizzo	2022	April 6, 2023
"SloMo" (Note: Season 2: Showdown (Tie-in to the Eurovision Song Contest)) (Note: Free for a limited time from May 9 to 17)	Chanel	2022	May 9, 2023
"Give That Wolf a Banana"	Subwoolfer	2022	May 17, 2023
"Euphoria"	Loreen	2012	May 25, 2023
"Beggin'"	Måneskin	2017	June 15, 2023
"Trenulețul"	Zdob și Zdub and Advahov Brothers	2021	June 22, 2023
"Dare to Live" (Note: Also appeared in the Chinese version of Just Dance 2020)	Trady	2021	June 29, 2023
"Sunroof" (Note: Season 3: Beach, Summer & Vampires) (Note: Free for a limited time from July 20 to 27)	Nicky Youre and Dazy	2021	July 20, 2023
"Bloody Mary"	Lady Gaga	2011	July 27, 2023
"Miraculous" (Note: Credited as "Miraculous Official Theme Song".) (Note: Tie in to Miraculous: Tales of Ladybug & Cat Noir, with the titular characters being the coaches.) (Note: Free for a limited time from August 10 to 16)	Lou and Lenni-Kim	2017	August 10, 2023
"Sacrifice"	The Weeknd	2022	August 17, 2023
"DJ Got Us Fallin' in Love"	Usher	2010	August 24, 2023

== Controversy ==
On March 20, 2023, a union claimed that ten percent of Ubisoft's employees experienced burnouts and work stoppages every four weeks during the production of Just Dance 2023 Edition.

== Reception ==
Reception

Aggregate score
Aggregator	Score
Metacritic	80/100 (XSX); 76/100 (NS); 70/100 (PS5)

Review scores
Publication	Score
Hardcore Gamer	4/5
Nintendo Life	7/10

Just Dance 2023 Edition received "generally favorable reviews", according to Metacritic.

== Awards and nominations ==
Year	Award	Category	Nominated work	Result	Ref.
2023	The Game Accessibility Conference	Best Representation	"Radioactive" routine	Won	
2023	Kids' Choice Awards	Favorite Video Game	Just Dance 2023	Nominated	

== Future ==
In an interview with JB Hi-Fi in November 2022, Just Dance brand director Amelie Louvet confirmed that 2023 Edition would be the final annual installment in the main series, with all further content, including new songs, game modes and features, being added to the game through online updates "throughout the months and years following launch". In a later interview with creative director Matthew Tomkinson, he further confirmed that the series will still release yearly installments through annual song packs instead of new games, and players owning 2023 Edition and future Editions can play with each other online. Subsequent song packs include 2024 Edition, released in October 2023; 2025 Edition, released in October 2024; 2026 Edition, released in October 2025; and Decades of Hits, released in October 2026.
