= Just Dance (video game series) =

Rhythm video game series

- Logo since 2022
- Genres: Rhythm; Dancing
- Developers: Ubisoft Paris; Ubisoft Milan; Ubisoft Reflections; Ubisoft Montreal; Ubisoft Bucharest; Ubisoft Montpellier; Ubisoft Pune; Ubisoft Barcelona; Ubisoft Shanghai; Ubisoft Bordeaux
- Publisher: Ubisoft
- Creator: Xavier Poix
- Platforms: Wii; Wii U PlayStation 3 PlayStation 4 PlayStation 5 Xbox 360; Xbox One; Xbox Series X/S iOS; Android; Nintendo Switch; Nintendo Switch 2 Microsoft Windows macOS; Stadia
- First release: Just Dance; November 17, 2009
- Latest release: Just Dance: Decades of Hits; October 13, 2026
- Spin-offs: Disney Party series Just Dance Kids series The Experience series

Just Dance is a rhythm game series developed and published by Ubisoft, beginning with the original game in 2009. The games feature a variety of songs that are accompanied by choreography performed by on-screen dancers. Players physically copy the dance routine shown on screen and are scored based on how accurately they follow. The series has attracted popularity among a wide age range and dance skill level, and has been played in various contexts, such as entertainment, fitness, and education.

== Gameplay ==
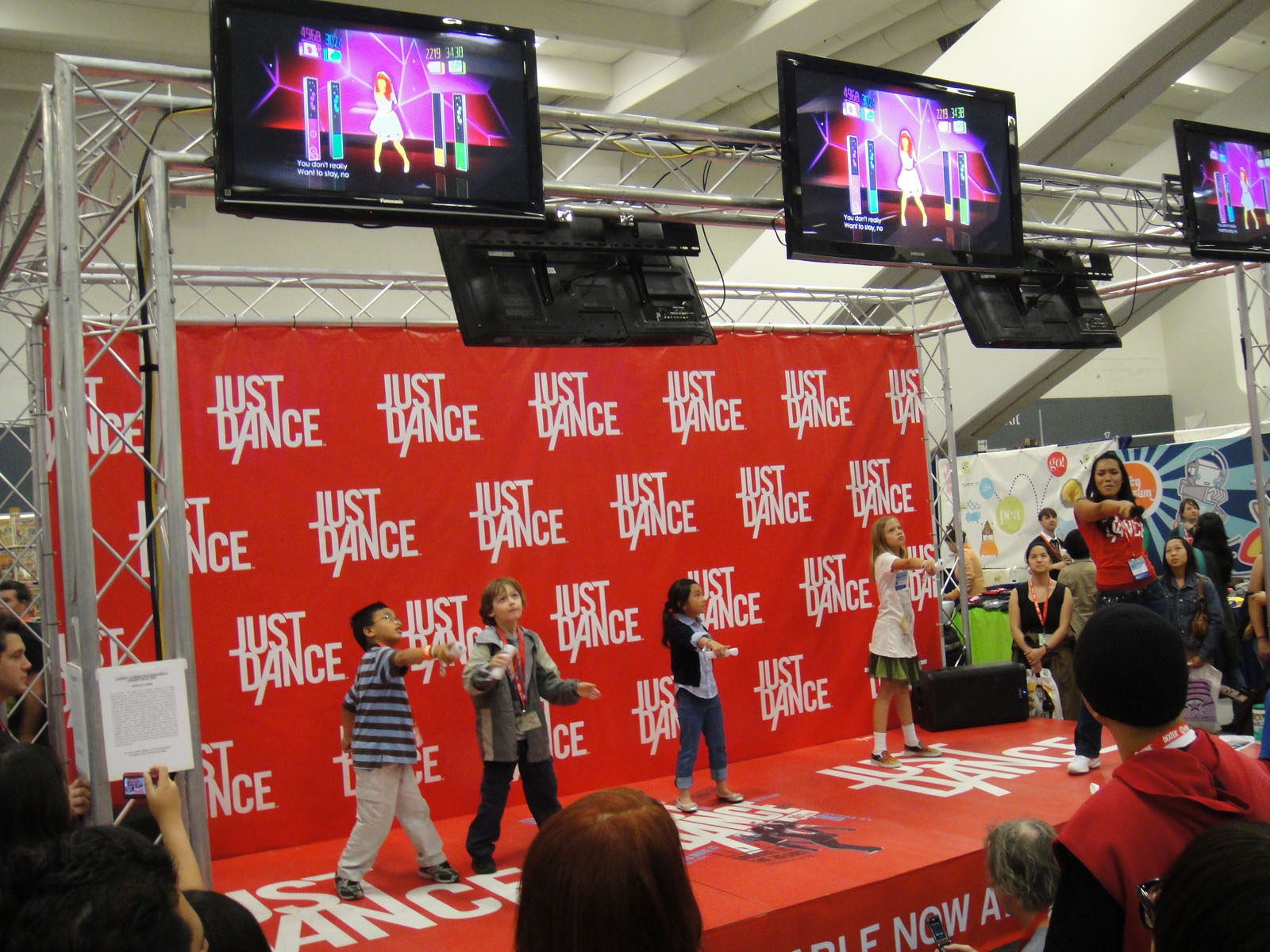
Just Dance at WonderCon 2010

Just Dance is a motion-based dance video game for multiple players, with each game including a collection of classic and modern songs each with its own dance choreographies. During each song, players mirror a dance performed by dancers on the screen, following moves that appear as pictorials on the bottom right corner of the screen, and are awarded for their accuracy. Additionally, there are gold moves in which players must strike a pose or complete the hardest move in the dance to receive bonus points. Players are given ranks based on how well they do. Depending on the game and system it is played on, the game can be played with either motion controllers or camera devices (such as the Wii Remote and Kinect), or using an app downloaded on a smart device. The game can be played by up to six players at once on eighth- and ninth-generation consoles, as well as the PC version of Just Dance 2017 and the Stadia version of Just Dance 2020, Just Dance 2021, and Just Dance 2022, with support for a gamepad and a keyboard used to navigate the menus. This excludes Dance Crew routines for Kinect users for the Xbox One version, as well as Wii Remote users for the Wii U version, and PlayStation Move users for the PlayStation 3 and PlayStation 4 versions, which are limited to four players. Seventh-generation consoles and the Wii U versions of Just Dance 4 to Just Dance 2015 and the Wii U version of Just Dance 2019 are also limited to four players.

== Games ==
Release timeline Main series in bold
2009	**Just Dance**
2010	**Just Dance 2**
2010	Just Dance Kids
2011	Just Dance: Summer Party
2011	**Just Dance 3**
2011	Just Dance Wii
2011	Just Dance Kids 2
2012	Just Dance: Greatest Hits
2012	Just Dance Wii 2
2012	**Just Dance 4**
2012	Just Dance: Disney Party
2013	**Just Dance 2014**
2013	Just Dance Kids 2014
2014	Just Dance Wii U
2014	**Just Dance 2015**
2015	**Just Dance 2016**
2015	Just Dance: Disney Party 2
2015	Yo-kai Watch Dance: Just Dance Special Version
2016	**Just Dance 2017**
2017	**Just Dance 2018**
2018	**Just Dance 2019**
2019	**Just Dance 2020**
2020	**Just Dance 2021**
2021	**Just Dance 2022**
2022	**Just Dance 2023 Edition**
2023	**Just Dance 2024 Edition**
2024	Just Dance VR
2024	**Just Dance 2025 Edition**
2025	**Just Dance 2026 Edition**
2026	**Just Dance: Decades of Hits**

=== Main series ===
Just Dance
The first Just Dance game was released on November 17, 2009, with songs by MC Hammer, Elvis Presley, Iggy Pop, The Beach Boys, Baha Men, Spice Girls, Gorillaz, Blur, and others.
Just Dance 2
Just Dance 2 was released on October 12, 2010. This installment featured 48 tracks, including downloadable content tracks, and is the only installment to support eight-player sessions. It features over 40 tracks by Kesha, Outkast, The Pussycat Dolls, Wham!, Avril Lavigne, Mika, Rihanna, Boney M., James Brown, The Jackson 5, and others.
Just Dance 3
Released on October 7, 2011. This installment was announced at the Ubisoft E3 2011 conference on June 6, and is the first installment to be released on Xbox 360 (with Kinect support) and PlayStation 3 (with PlayStation Move support). It includes over 40 tracks by Jessie J, Katy Perry, Gwen Stefani, A-ha, Kiss, Lenny Kravitz, The Black Eyed Peas, and others.

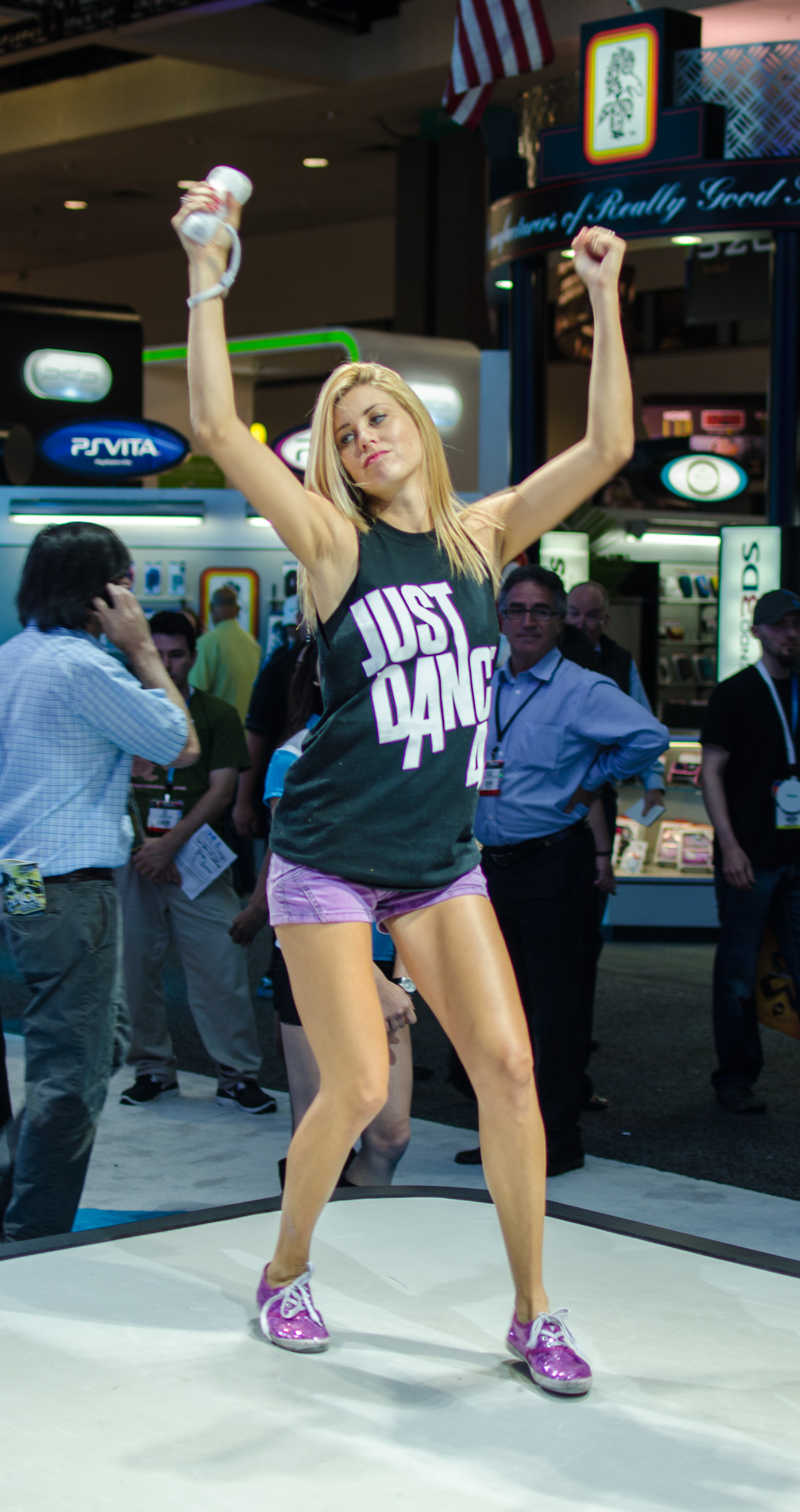
Promotion of Just Dance 4 at E3 2012

Just Dance 4
Released on October 9, 2012. This installment was announced at the Ubisoft E3 2012 conference on June 4, and is the first installment to be released on the Wii U. It includes over 50 tracks by Carly Rae Jepsen, Pink, The B-52s, Rihanna, Flo Rida, Stevie Wonder, Skrillex, and others.
Just Dance 2014
Released on October 8, 2013. This installment was announced at the Ubisoft E3 2013 conference on June 10. It is the first Just Dance game to be released on Xbox One and PlayStation 4. It includes over 40 tracks by Lady Gaga, Nicki Minaj, Psy, One Direction, Chris Brown, Ariana Grande, ABBA, George Michael, Ricky Martin, and others.
Just Dance 2015
Released on October 20, 2014. This installment was announced at the Ubisoft E3 2014 conference on June 9. It includes over 40 tracks by Pharrell Williams, John Newman, Katy Perry, Iggy Azalea, Maroon 5, and others.
Just Dance 2016
Released on October 20, 2015. This installment was announced at the Ubisoft E3 2015 conference on June 15. It includes over 40 tracks by Calvin Harris, David Guetta, Meghan Trainor, Britney Spears, Mark Ronson, Shakira, Kelly Clarkson, Demi Lovato, and others.

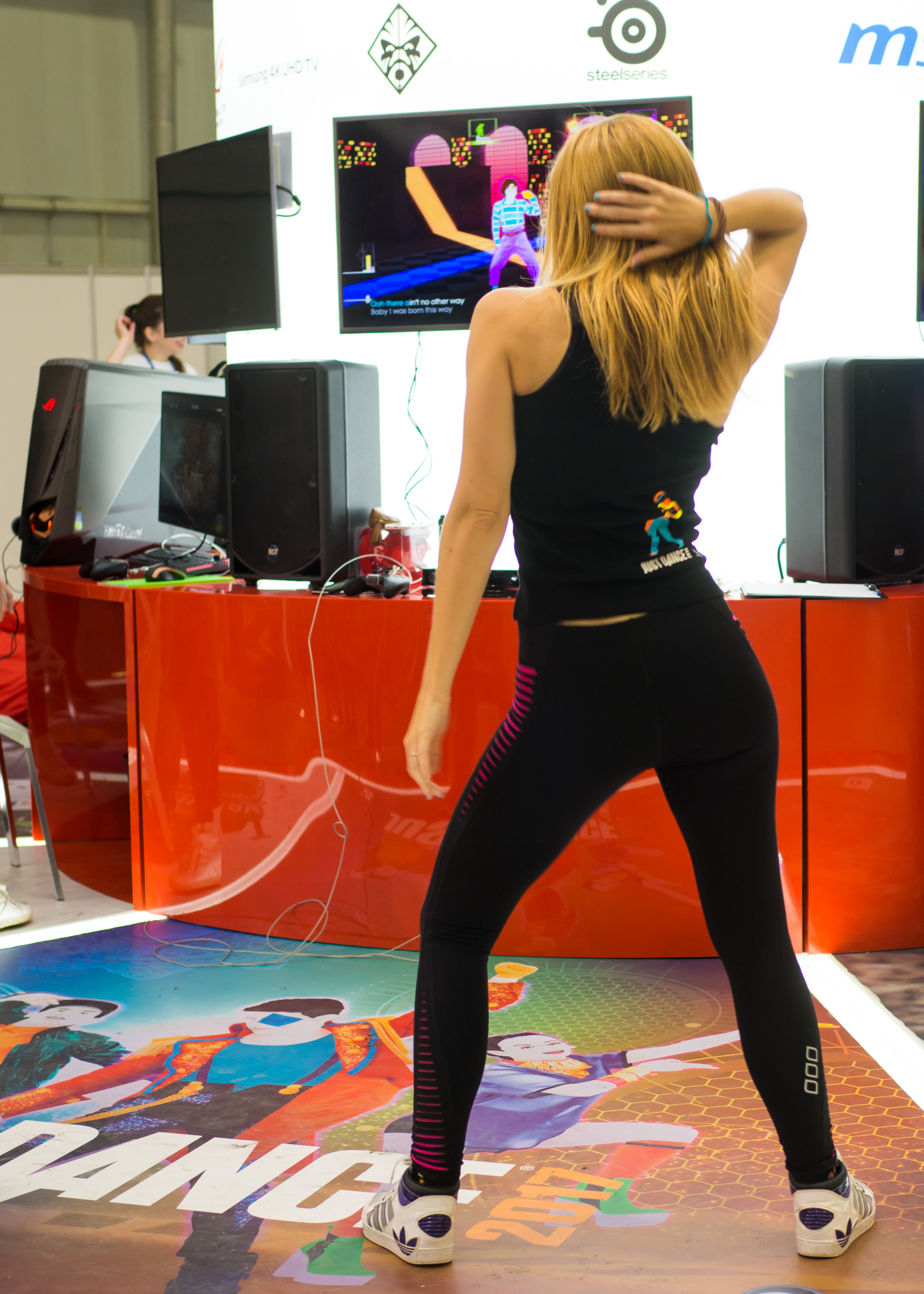
Promotion of Just Dance 2017 at IgroMir 2016

Just Dance 2017
Released on October 25, 2016. This installment was announced at the Ubisoft E3 2016 conference on June 13. It includes tracks by Anitta, Sia, Justin Bieber, The Weeknd, Major Lazer, OneRepublic, Fifth Harmony, Queen, Beyoncé, DNCE, and others. This is the only title in the series to be released on Microsoft Windows via Ubisoft Connect and Steam, and is the first to be released on the Nintendo Switch.
Just Dance 2018
Released on October 24, 2017. This installment was announced at the Ubisoft E3 2017 conference on June 12. It includes tracks by Bebe Rexha, Bruno Mars, Ariana Grande, Big Freedia, Shakira, Clean Bandit, Dua Lipa, TomSka, Luis Fonsi, Selena Gomez, and others. It is the last game in the series to be released on the PlayStation 3.
Just Dance 2019
Released on October 23, 2018. This installment was announced at the Ubisoft E3 2018 conference on June 11. It includes tracks by Bruno Mars, BigBang, Blackpink, Sean Paul, J Balvin, Camila Cabello, Daddy Yankee, and others. It is the last game in the series to be released on the Wii U and the last physical game overall to be released for the Xbox 360.
Just Dance 2020
Released on November 5, 2019. This installment was announced at the Ubisoft E3 2019 conference on June 10. It includes tracks from Ariana Grande, Billie Eilish, Ed Sheeran, 2NE1, Panic! at the Disco, Khalid, and others. It is the first game in the series to be released on Stadia and the last game to be physically released on the Wii in North America.
Just Dance 2021
Released on November 12, 2020. This installment was announced on August 26, during the Nintendo Direct Mini: Partner Showcase August 2020 web presentation. It includes tracks from Dua Lipa, Twice, Lady Gaga, Ariana Grande, Eminem, NCT 127, Blackpink, Selena Gomez, and others. It is the first game in the series to be released on the Xbox Series X/S and PlayStation 5.
Just Dance 2022
Released on November 4, 2021. This installment was announced on June 12, during the Ubisoft Forward web presentation at E3 2021. It includes tracks from Todrick Hall, Anuel AA, Imagine Dragons, Ciara, Meghan Trainor, Camila Cabello, Olivia Rodrigo, Bella Poarch, Pabllo Vittar, and others. It is the last game in the series to be released on the PlayStation 4, Xbox One, and Stadia.
Just Dance 2023 Edition
Released on November 22, 2022. This installment was announced on September 10, during the Ubisoft Forward September 2022 web presentation. It includes tracks from Justin Timberlake, Bruno Mars, Dua Lipa, Ava Max, BTS, Taylor Swift and others. 2023 Edition marks a new release format for the series, with all future content consolidated into a Just Dance live service platform, transitioning to annual song packs. The service is also backward compatible with the Nintendo Switch 2.
Just Dance 2024 Edition
Released on October 24, 2023. This installment, serving as the second annual song pack for the Just Dance service, was announced on June 12, during the Ubisoft Forward June 2023 web presentation. It includes tracks by Sub Urban, Rosalía, Miley Cyrus, SZA, Blackpink, Aurora, and others.
Just Dance 2025 Edition
Released on October 15, 2024. This installment, serving as the third annual song pack for the Just Dance service, was announced on June 18, during the Nintendo Direct June 2024 web presentation. It includes tracks by Jack Harlow, Ariana Grande, Melanie Martinez, Celine Dion, Blackpink, Green Day, and others.
Just Dance 2026 Edition
Released on October 14, 2025. This installment, serving as the fourth annual song pack for the Just Dance service, was announced on July 31, during the Nintendo Direct: Partner Showcase July 2025 web presentation. It includes tracks by Doechii, Sabrina Carpenter, Post Malone, Lola Young, Tate McRae, Paul Russell, Coldplay, and others.
Just Dance: Decades of Hits
Released on October 13, 2026. This installment, serving as the fifth annual song pack for the Just Dance service, was announced on September 10. The first installment to receive a native port for the Nintendo Switch 2, it marks a departure from the yearly naming scheme for the main series. It includes tracks by Daft Punk, Billy Joel, NSYNC, TLC, Elton John, Zara Larsson, Bad Bunny, and others.

=== Japan exclusives ===
Just Dance Wii
A Japanese version of Just Dance was published and edited by Nintendo and developed by Ubisoft Paris. It was released on October 13, 2011, for the Wii. It features 16 J-pop songs from Exile, Kara, Koda Kumi, and AKB48, as well as eleven songs from Just Dance and Just Dance 2 and one song based on the Super Mario Bros. game that can be unlocked by playing all of the other songs. According to Media Create, as of March 11, 2012, the game sold 560,301 copies in Japan.
Just Dance Wii 2
The second Japanese Just Dance game was published and edited by Nintendo and developed by Ubisoft Paris. It was released on July 26, 2012, for the Wii. It includes 20 J-pop songs from Exile, Kara, Speed, Da Pump, T-ara, DJ Ozma, 2PM, Happiness, and MAX, as well as 15 songs from Just Dance 2 and Just Dance 3.
Just Dance Wii U
The third Japanese Just Dance game was published and edited by Nintendo and developed by Ubisoft Paris, Ubisoft Reflections, Ubisoft Romania, Ubisoft Montpellier, Ubisoft Bucharest, Ubisoft Milan and Ubisoft Pune. It was announced in a Nintendo Direct on February 14, 2014, and was released on April 3, 2014, for the Wii U. It includes 20 J-pop songs by SKE48, AKB48, BigBang, Kyary Pamyu Pamyu, and Momoiro Clover Z, as well as 15 songs from Just Dance 4 and Just Dance 2014.
Yo-kai Watch Dance: Just Dance Special Version
The fourth Japanese Just Dance game was developed by Ubisoft Paris, Ubisoft Reflections, Ubisoft Romania, Ubisoft Montpellier, Ubisoft Bucharest, Ubisoft Milan and Ubisoft Pune and co-developed and published by Level-5, featuring songs and characters from the Yo-kai Watch video game and anime franchise. It was released on December 5, 2015, for the Wii U.

=== Just Dance Kids series ===
Just Dance Kids
Released on November 9, 2010, for the Wii, it was created with an emphasis on songs popular with children. It features 42 tracks from various children's songs, songs from television series including Yo Gabba Gabba! and The Wiggles and covers of songs from various artists, including Justin Bieber, Selena Gomez & the Scene, and Demi Lovato. The game was released in Australia and Europe under the name Dance Juniors in February 2011.
Just Dance Kids 2
The second installment in the Just Dance Kids franchise, released on October 25, 2011, for the PlayStation 3, Wii, and Xbox 360. It features 40 tracks from various children's songs, songs from films including Shrek 2, Gnomeo and Juliet, Despicable Me and Disney's Tangled, songs from television series including Yo Gabba Gabba! and The Wiggles, and covers of songs from various artists, including Willow Smith, Jonas Brothers, and Bruno Mars. The game was released in Australia and Europe as Just Dance Kids in November 2011, as the first installment was called Dance Juniors in these countries.
Just Dance Kids 2014
The third installment in the Just Dance Kids franchise, released on October 22, 2013, for the Wii, Wii U, and Xbox 360. It features over 30 tracks that includes the original versions of songs from artists including Demi Lovato, One Direction, and Bridgit Mendler and songs from television series and films, including Victorious, Fraggle Rock, Yo Gabba Gabba! and The Wiggles.

=== Disney Party series ===
Just Dance: Disney Party
Just Dance: Disney Party is the first installment in the Disney Party series, a spin-off to the Just Dance Kids series, published for the Wii and Xbox 360. It was released on October 23, 2012 in North America, October 25, 2012 in Australia, and October 26, 2012, in Europe. It includes songs from Disney and Disney Channel series and films.
Just Dance: Disney Party 2
Released on October 20, 2015 for the Wii, Wii U, Xbox 360, and Xbox One, Just Dance: Disney Party 2 features over 20 songs from Disney Channel series and films.

=== The Experience series ===
Michael Jackson: The Experience
The first Experience game from Ubisoft and spin-off of the Just Dance series, featuring 26 songs and full dance choreography by Michael Jackson. It was released in November 2010 for the Wii, PlayStation 3, and Mac OS X; Eurogamer stated that the dance routines in the Xbox 360 game "feel a little slower and more simplistic than those in the PS3 game".
The Black Eyed Peas Experience
The second Experience game from Ubisoft and spin-off of the Just Dance series, the game features more than 20 tracks by The Black Eyed Peas and was released in November 2011 for the Xbox 360 and Wii. The Xbox 360 version has a completely different gameplay from that of the Wii version.
The Hip Hop Dance Experience
The third Experience game by Ubisoft. It includes songs by artists such as Flo Rida, B.o.B, Rihanna, and others. It was released in 2012 for the Wii and Xbox 360.

=== Other spin-offs ===
Dance on Broadway
A non-Just Dance related game released in 2010 for the Wii and 2011 for the PlayStation 3, featuring a selection of 20 songs from Broadway musicals, including "I Just Can't Wait to Be King" from The Lion King, "Bend and Snap" from Legally Blonde, "Fame" from Fame and "Time Warp" from The Rocky Horror Picture Show.
The Smurfs Dance Party
A spin-off of the Just Dance Kids series, featuring 25 songs. The game allows players to dance alongside Papa Smurf, Clumsy Smurf, Brainy Smurf, Grouchy Smurf, Gutsy Smurf, Smurfette, and Gargamel. It was released for the Wii on July 19, 2011, in North America, July 29, 2011, in Europe, and September 8, 2011, in Australia.
ABBA: You Can Dance
Another spin-off of the Just Dance series, featuring 26 ABBA songs. It was released for the Wii on November 15, 2011, in North America, November 24, 2011, in Australia, and November 25, 2011, in Europe.
Just Sing
Another spin-off title to the Just Dance series, featuring over 40 songs. It is a karaoke music video game that allows people to sing to songs. It was released for PlayStation 4 and Xbox One on September 6, 2016.

=== Greatest Hits series ===
Just Dance: Greatest Hits
Just Dance: Greatest Hits (also known as Just Dance: Best Of for PAL Wii) includes songs from previous titles: Just Dance, Just Dance 2 and Just Dance: Summer Party, one PS3 exclusive/Wii DLC from Just Dance 3: "Baby Don't Stop Now" by Anja, and the two NTSC Target/Zellers/Xbox 360 PAL exclusive songs from Just Dance 3: "Airplanes" by B.o.B featuring Hayley Williams, and "Only Girl (In the World)" by Rihanna.

=== Specials ===
Just Dance: Summer Party
Just Dance Summer Party (also known in Australia and Europe as Just Dance 2: Extra Songs) includes most of the downloadable content from Just Dance 2, and two of the Best Buy exclusive songs from that game: "Jai Ho! (You Are My Destiny)" by A. R. Rahman and The Pussycat Dolls featuring Nicole Scherzinger, and "Funkytown" by Lipps Inc. covered by Sweat Invaders in-game. Four of the songs that were downloadable songs from Just Dance 2 were absent from the game, including "It's Not Unusual" by Tom Jones and "Spice Up Your Life" by Spice Girls, along with the Best Buy exclusive song "Should I Stay or Should I Go" by the Crash.

=== Others ===
Just Dance Now
Just Dance Now is a mobile video game that allows users to play Just Dance anywhere after syncing up a device with the website on a television screen or a computer. It does not require a console to be played, and the device used to sync the game is used as a controller in a similar way to the Wii Remote or Joy-Con.
Just Dance Controller
Just Dance Controller is an app that allows users to play Just Dance anywhere after syncing up a device with a game on a console or computer. The device used to sync to the game is used as a controller, similar to the Wii Remote or Joy-Con. The app was originally known as Just Dance 2015 Motion Controller for the PS4 and Xbox One versions of Just Dance 2015; it was later retitled Just Dance Controller on July 27, 2015. Support for the app was added to the Wii U version of Just Dance 2016, and later the PC and Nintendo Switch versions of Just Dance 2017 (the PC version requires a smart device to play). Until Just Dance 2018, there was a "photo booth" option, which allowed the player to take a self-portrait customized with items from the game. Smart device compatibility was removed from the Wii U and Nintendo Switch versions of Just Dance 2019 in October 2018, and later Just Dance 2015 in November 2018. It returned to the Nintendo Switch and Stadia versions of Just Dance 2020, and the ninth-generation console versions of Just Dance 2021, all of which require a smart device to play.
Just Dance Unlimited
Just Dance Unlimited is a subscription-based service, featured on Just Dance 2016 to Just Dance 2022, which replaced downloadable content. By the end of the post-launch cycle for Just Dance 2022, the service featured over 700 songs. Unlimited was delisted on Xbox and PlayStation consoles on July 1, 2024, and on Nintendo Switch on March 31, 2025.
Just Dance+
Just Dance+ is a subscription service that was launched alongside Just Dance 2023 Edition. It serves as a replacement for Just Dance Unlimited and features songs from previous Just Dance games alongside new exclusive songs.
Just Dance VR
Just Dance VR is a virtual reality game that allows players to dance to 25 songs from the main series, rebuilt in a virtual reality environment. It was released on October 15, 2024, for Meta Quest 2, 3, and Pro.

== Reception ==
=== Reviews ===
All game reviews are from Metacritic.

==== Main series ====
- Just Dance: 49 out of 100
- Just Dance 2: 74 out of 100
- Just Dance 3: 70 out of 100 (Xbox 360), 74 out of 100 (Wii), and 75 out of 100 (PS3)
- Just Dance 4: 66 out of 100 (Wii U), 74 out of 100 (Wii), and 77 out of 100 (Xbox 360 and PS3)
- Just Dance 2014: 71 out of 100 (Xbox One), 72 out of 100 (Wii U), 75 out of 100 (PS4), 77 out of 100 (PS3), and 79 out of 100 (Xbox 360)
- Just Dance 2015: 70 out of 100 (Xbox One), 72 out of 100 (PS4), and 75 out of 100 (Wii U)
- Just Dance 2016: 66 out of 100 (Xbox One), and 73 out of 100 (PS4 and Wii U)
- Just Dance 2017: 72 out of 100 (Nintendo Switch), and 73 out of 100 (Xbox One and PS4)
- Just Dance 2018: 71 out of 100 (Nintendo Switch), and 75 out of 100 (PS4)
- Just Dance 2019: 72 out of 100 (Nintendo Switch), and 77 out of 100 (Xbox One and PS4)
- Just Dance 2020: 74 out of 100 (Nintendo Switch), and 77 out of 100 (PS4)
- Just Dance 2021: 70 out of 100 (Nintendo Switch)
- Just Dance 2022: 71 out of 100 (Nintendo Switch), and 83 out of 100 (Xbox Series X/S)
- Just Dance 2023 Edition: 70 out of 100 (PlayStation 5), 76 out of 100 (Nintendo Switch), and 80 out of 100 (Xbox Series X/S)
- Just Dance 2024 Edition: 68 out of 100 (PlayStation 5) and 72 out of 100 (Nintendo Switch)
- Just Dance 2025 Edition: 79 out of 100 (PlayStation 5) and 72 out of 100 (Nintendo Switch)
- Just Dance 2026 Edition: 82 out of 100 (PlayStation 5), 74 out of 100 (Nintendo Switch), and 75 out of 100 (Xbox Series X/S)

==== Spin-offs ====
- Dance on Broadway: 48 out of 100 (Wii)
- Michael Jackson: The Experience: 56 out of 100 (Wii), and 66 out of 100 (PS3)
- ABBA: You Can Dance: 66 out of 100
- Just Sing: 60 out of 100 (PS4)

== Possible film adaptation ==
On 14 January 2019, Deadline reported that Screen Gems had acquired rights to a film adaptation of Just Dance, with Jason Altman and Margaret Boykin from Ubisoft Film & Television set to produce alongside Jodi Hildebrand and Will Gluck of Olive Bridge Entertainment. In January 2020, it was reported that Molly Prather, Amelie Gillette, Brian Gatewood, and Alessandro Tanaka wrote the script for the film. In January 2023, Gluck was reported to be rewriting the script alongside A. C. Bradley.
