= The Hip Hop Dance Experience =

2012 video game

- North American Wii box art
- Developer(s): iNiS (Xbox 360/Wii); Land Ho! (Wii)
- Publisher(s): Ubisoft
- Engine: Unreal Engine 3 (Xbox 360)
- Platform(s): Wii, Xbox 360
- Release: November 13, 2012
- Genre(s): Dance

The Hip Hop Dance Experience is a dance game for the Wii and Xbox 360 (with Kinect) published by Ubisoft. It is a continuation of The Experience, a spin-off series of the larger Just Dance series.

== Gameplay ==
The game includes features such as adjustable difficulty levels (Newbie, Mack Skills and Go Hard, with the Wii version using one pre-selected difficulty out of the three), player avatars with over 100 accessories, as well as many game modes, including Dance Party, Dance Battle, Dance Marathon, Power-Skooling, and other single-player or multiplayer challenges. Dance Party gives the player an option of forty songs to choose from, Dance Battle has two or more players perform dance moves to boost their own scores while attempting to take away points from others, Dance Marathon is an endless stream of songs that tests the player's stamina, and Power-Skooling allows the player to perfect iconic dance moves step by step. The choreographers in this game are Laurieann Gibson, Dave Scott and Kid David.

== Songs ==
The setlist consists of 40 songs. Note that the following are from the Xbox 360 version.

Song	Artist	Year
"1 Thing"	Amerie	2005
"1, 2 Step"	Ciara feat. Missy Elliott	2005
"Airplanes"	B.o.B feat. Hayley Williams	2010
"Bad Girls" (Note: Only available on the Xbox 360 version.)	M.I.A.	2012
"Blow the Whistle"	Too Short	2006
"B.O.B"	Outkast	2000
"Creep"	TLC	1994
"Danger (Been So Long)"	Mystikal feat. Nivea	2000
"Day 'n' Nite"	Kid Cudi	2008
"Down"	Jay Sean feat. Lil Wayne	2009
"Drop It Like It's Hot"	Snoop Dogg feat. Pharrell Williams	2004
"Funkdafied"	Da Brat	1994
"Got Your Money"	Ol' Dirty Bastard feat. Kelis	1999
"Hard"	Rihanna feat. Jeezy	2009
"Hip Hop Hooray"	Naughty by Nature	1993
"Hot in Herre"	Nelly	2002
"If It Isn't Love"	New Edition	1988
"Ignition (Remix)"	R. Kelly	2003
"International Love"	Pitbull feat. Chris Brown	2011
"It Takes Two"	Rob Base and DJ E-Z Rock	1988
"It's Tricky"	Run-DMC	1987
"Lean Back"	Terror Squad feat. Fat Joe and Remy Ma	2004
"Lollipop"	Lil Wayne feat. Static Major	2008
"Look at Me Now"	Chris Brown feat. Busta Rhymes and Lil Wayne	2011
"Me and U"	Cassie	2006
"Moment 4 Life"	Nicki Minaj feat. Drake	2010
"Over"	Drake	2010
"Rapper's Delight"	The Sugarhill Gang	1979
"Replay"	Iyaz	2009
"Return of the Mack"	Mark Morrison	1996
"Run It!"	Chris Brown feat. Juelz Santana	2005
"Say Aah"	Trey Songz feat. Fabolous	2010
"Sexy and I Know It"	LMFAO	2011
"She Wants to Move"	N.E.R.D.	2004
"So Good"	B.o.B	2012
"Tipsy"	J-Kwon	2003
"Vivrant Thing"	Q-Tip	1999
"Wild Ones"	Flo Rida feat. Sia	2011
"Work Hard, Play Hard"	Wiz Khalifa	2012
"You're a Jerk"	New Boyz	2009

== Reception ==
Reception

Aggregate score
Aggregator	Score
Metacritic	72/100

Review scores
Publication	Score
Eurogamer	7/10
Official Xbox Magazine (US)	6.5/10

Metacritic, which uses a weighted average, assigned the game a score of 72 out of 100, based on critics 5, indicating "Mixed or Average" reception.
