= OddBallers =

2023 party video game

- Developers: Game Swing; Ubisoft Mumbai (Note: Additional work by Ubisoft Pune.)
- Publisher: Ubisoft (Note: Early access version published by Game Swing.)
- Director: Martin Kai Sommer
- Designers: Miki Anthony; Anders Østergaard
- Programmers: Martin Thomsen; Kristian Torgard
- Artist: Lars Lillevang Bindslev
- Composer: Rasmus Hartvig
- Platforms: Nintendo Switch; PlayStation 4; Windows; Xbox One
- Release: WW: January 23, 2023
- Genre: Party game
- Modes: Single-player, multiplayer

OddBallers is a dodgeball-themed party game developed by Game Swing and Ubisoft Mumbai and published by Ubisoft. It released on January 23, 2023 for the Nintendo Switch, PlayStation 4, Xbox One, and Windows platforms.

== Gameplay ==
Oddballers is a multiplayer party video game themed around the game of dodgeball. The game is played from the top-down perspective and loosely follows the premise of dodgeball, where two teams throw balls at each other, with the goal being to hit opposing players with the ball, or in defense, catch the ball being thrown at them. However, many new elements are added into the formula due to environmental effects and mini-games objectives that occur concurrently. Thirty different arenas across three main themes - farm, city, and island - affect the gameplay. For example, in the farm themed levels, players may have added objectives of avoiding being run over by a tractor or shearing any sheep they encounter. Another minigame involves beekeeping and obtaining and transporting honey while playing dodgeball. Progressing through matches allows the player to unlock character customization options such a appearances changes and celebration emotes through a free battle pass setup. Both local and online multiplayer is available, with four or six player multiplayer being possible depending on game mode and game platform. Cross-platform play is available for online matches between platforms.

== Development ==
The game was originally self-developed by Game Swing and was released onto early access for Windows on Steam in 2020. Ubisoft would later purchase the rights for the game, and the full version was announced in a September 2022 Nintendo Direct presentation. Its development was a collaboration between developer Game Swing and Ubisoft Mumbai, with additional work by Ubisoft Pune. The game was released on January 22, 2023, for the Nintendo Switch, PlayStation 4, Xbox One and Windows through Ubisoft Connect.

== Reception ==
The game has received mixed reception from critics. IGN, Eurogamer, and Nintendo Life all saw it as a fun but flawed game. Aspects praised include the core gameplay mechanics, amount of unlockables and customization for characters, and simple controls. The minigame that interwove beekeeping into the dodgeball formula was cited as a standout minigame. A major complaint was the game's online multiplayer, in that it was very difficult to find others to play with, and the inability to play online lessened the importance of the character customization, which was a major point of the game's progression.
