= ABBA: You Can Dance =

2011 video game

- European box art
- Developers: Ubisoft Paris; Ubisoft Bucharest
- Publisher: Ubisoft
- Series: Just Dance
- Platform: Wii
- Release: NA: November 15, 2011; AU: November 24, 2011; EU: November 25, 2011
- Genres: Music, rhythm
- Modes: Single player, Multiplayer

ABBA: You Can Dance is a dance video game for the Wii published by Ubisoft in November 2011. A spin-off of the Just Dance series, the game features 26 songs by the Swedish pop group ABBA. The game tasks up to four players with matching the movements of ABBA members by dancing with the Wii Remote motion controller in hand, with accuracy being the goal. It includes a multiplayer "Karaoke Mode", allowing two players to sing using USB microphones while two other players can dance. This game is based on the Wii version of Michael Jackson: The Experience.

The uniting-people-through-dance philosophy of Just Dance and ABBA's music greenlit the idea of a ABBA dance game. Ubisoft's Paris and Bucharest divisions developed ABBA: You Can Dance, putting in effort to ensure that they accurately represented the group by examining a variety of ABBA content. The game was met with mixed reviews, with criticism directed at the lack of available songs but appreciation towards the low price, choreography and high amount of content. The game sold more than 725,000 copies by 2014.

== Gameplay ==
ABBA: You Can Dance is a music and rhythm game based on Ubisoft's franchise, Just Dance. In the main mode of play, up to four players must match the movements of members of the Swedish pop group ABBA by dancing with the Wii Remote motion controller in hand. The players' score is determined by how accurate their movements are. A karaoke mode is included, where two players can sing along together to the lyrics using USB microphones while two other players can dance during a song. In addition to the lyrics, the songs display the rhythm of the singing. This is unlike past Just Dance and titles connected to Just Dance, which only let players sing along for fun. The game features a story mode called the "Mini Musical Mode" that features select songs from the main mode of play, and shows the original ABBA music videos. The game features 26 songs from ABBA.

Song name	Year
"Angeleyes"	1979
"As Good as New"	1979
"Bang-A-Boomerang"	1975
"Dancing Queen"	1976
"Does Your Mother Know"	1979
"Fernando"	1976
"Gimme! Gimme! Gimme! (A Man After Midnight)"	1979
"Head over Heels"	1982
"Hole in Your Soul"	1977
"Honey, Honey"	1974
"I'm a Marionette"	1977
"I Do, I Do, I Do, I Do, I Do"	1975
"If It Wasn't for the Nights"	1979
"Knowing Me, Knowing You"	1977
"Lay All Your Love on Me"	1981
"Mamma Mia"	1975
"Money, Money, Money"	1976
"People Need Love"	1972
"SOS"	1975
"Summer Night City"	1978
"Super Trouper"	1980
"Take a Chance on Me"	1978
"Voulez-Vous"	1979
"Waterloo"	1974
"When I Kissed the Teacher"	1976
"The Winner Takes It All"	1980

== Development and release ==
The game has characters on screen that players are meant to mimic. The choreography received commentary from critics.

Ubisoft Paris and Ubisoft Bucharest, divisions of Ubisoft that worked on entries in the Just Dance series, developed ABBA: You Can Dance. The concept of an ABBA dancing game was based on the observation that Just Dance and the Swedish group's songs followed similar philosophies about uniting people through music. The team chose the band's most popular songs, such as "Mamma Mia", "Dancing Queen", and "Take a Chance on Me", but wanted to reflect the variety of moods and aesthetics ABBA songs represent.

Pofessional choreographers worked with level designers to make the dance scenes. Certain songs, such as ballads and slower songs, were harder to choreograph for. The team reviewed various footage of performances, including music videos, anecdotes, backstage photos, live footage, and TV shows. The backgrounds were designed with the intent to convey certain elements from ABBA's work. Some costumes were taken from the music videos, While others were new to this game, but designed to get as close to the spirit of the original costumes.

The budget release came out in North America on November 15, 2011, in Australia on November 24, 2011 and a day later in Europe.

== Reception ==
Reception

Aggregate score
Aggregator	Score
Metacritic	66/100

Review score
Publication	Score
The Guardian	3/5

ABBA: You Can Dance garnered mixed reviews upon release. Wired and Club Nintendo staff both felt like it had wide appeal, with the latter recognizing it as having nostalgic value. The game was considered a good fit for enjoyers of the band by Multiplayer.it and Cubed3, although it bored a Jeuxvideo.com critic who was also a fan.

Some, such as GamesRadar+ and The Guardian, were positive towards its low price tag but were disappointed by the small song selection. However, PCMag and Common Sense Media appreciated the amount of content in other areas, such as different modes of play and archival media of ABBA's concerts and behind-the-scenes photos.

The choreography was praised by Ditum and Multiplayer.it, the latter commenting that it inherited both good and bad qualities from Just Dance. Jeuxvideo.com, meanwhile, felt that the choreography was accessible but unoriginal and repetitive. As of 2014, ABBA: You Can Dance sold 720,000 copies by 2014.
