= Christell =

Chilean singer

Christell Rodriguez
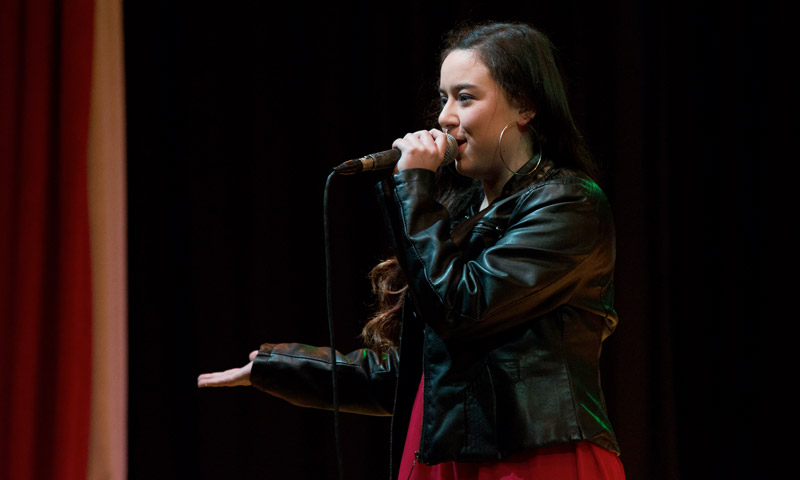
- Christell in 2015

Background information
- Born: Christell Jazmín Rodriguez Carrillo; 2 January 1998 (age 28)
- Origin: Talcahuano, Chile
- Occupation: Singer
- Instrument: Vocals
- Years active: 2003–2006, 2008–present
- Label: Warner Music Group

Christell Jazmín Rodriguez Carrillo (born 2 January 1998), better known as Christell, is a Chilean singer. She has recorded three albums, and was nominated for a Latin Grammy Award for her second album, La Fiesta Continua.

Her song "Dubidubidu", from her debut 2003 album Christell, went viral in late 2023 and 2024.

== Biography ==
Christell is the only daughter of Christian Rodriguez and Myriam Carrillo, both members of a Christian music group.

In November 2003, Christell released her first album, Christell, under the Warner Music Group label.

In 2005, Christell toured in Mexico, Puerto Rico and Latin communities of the United States, like Miami and Los Angeles. In November, her second album, La Fiesta Continua, was nominated for the Latin Grammy Award for Best Album for Children.

== Discography ==
=== Albums ===
Year	Title	List of songs	Sales and certifications
2003	Christell	1. Mueve el Ombligo; 2. Mi Mama me Mima; 3. Mis Amigos Barney, Bob Esponja, La Sirenita; 4. Como Quieres Que Te Quiera; 5. Borriquito Como Tu; 6. Mi Jardín Infantil; 7. Corazón Chiquitito; 8. Jerigonza; 9. Mini Zoo, La Cicaracha, 10 Perritos; 10. Dubidubidu	8 Platinum discs (126,000 copies)
2004	La Fiesta Continua	1. Chiki – Chiqui; 2. Te Terete te 3. La cosquillita 4. Caprichito; 5. Escala Musical; 6. Corazón Bum Bum; 7. Medley Juguemos a la ronda (El Sapito La arañita); 8. No estoy ni ahí 9. Cumpleaños Feliz; 10. Mi jardín infantil (Alicia va en el Coche) Karaoke; 11. Mini Zoo (Yo tenía 10 Perritos) Karaoke; 12. Juguemos a la ronda (El Sapito La arañita) Karaoke	5 Platinum discs
2004	Ponte las Pilas	1. Ponte Las Pilas; 2. Eres Un Bombom; 3. Querida Abuela; 4. Un Poco Tu Un Poco Yo; 5. La Gotita; 6. Caramelo De Menta; 7. Boom Boom; 8. Absolutamente Todos; 9. Karaoke Ponte Las Pilas; 10. Karaoke Caramelo De Menta; 11. Bonus Track: Clip Mueve El Ombligo	2 Platinum discs

== Awards ==
Year	Nominee / work	Award	Result
2005	La Fiesta Continua	Latin Grammy Award for Best Album for Children	Nominated
