= Just Dance Kids 2 =

2011 video game

- North American Wii box art
- Developer: Land Ho!
- Publisher: Ubisoft
- Producers: MRB Productions, Inc.
- Series: Just Dance
- Platforms: PlayStation 3, Wii, Xbox 360
- Release: NA: October 25, 2011; AU: November 3, 2011; EU: November 4, 2011
- Genres: Music, rhythm
- Modes: Single player, multiplayer

Just Dance Kids 2 (released as Just Dance Kids in Europe and Australia) is a 2011 video game for the Wii, PlayStation Move for PlayStation 3 and Kinect for Xbox 360, developed by Japanese studio Land Ho!, and is part of Ubisoft's Just Dance franchise. Like its predecessor, Just Dance Kids 2 is a dance-based music game with an emphasis on songs that are popular with children. The game was released on October 25, 2011 in North America, November 3, 2011 in Australia and November 4, 2011 in Europe and contains 40 songs.

== Track listing ==
Song	Artist (English)	Year
"Accidentally in Love" (Note: The original version of this song is used in Just Dance Now and Just Dance Unlimited even though it uses the same background and dancers and Counting Crows is credited as The Just Dance Kids.)	Counting Crows	2004
"Alright"	David Choi	2011
"Are You Sleeping" (Note: Can be played in different languages.)	The Just Dance Kids	2011
"Barbara Ann"	The Beach Boys	1965
"Burnin' Up"	Jonas Brothers	2008
"Crocodile Rock"	Nelly Furtado and Elton John	2011
"Despicable Me"	Pharrell Williams	2010
"Dumb Love"	Sean Kingston	2010
"Feeling Good"	Michael Bublé	2005
"Five Little Monkeys"	The Just Dance Kids	2011
"Follow the Leader"	The Wiggles	2007
"Girls Can Too"	Tyler Van Der Berg	2011
"Hand In Hand" (Note: Instrumental in the PAL regions.)	The Just Dance Kids	2011
"Head, Shoulders, Knees and Toes"	Nadia Gifford	2011
"Hokey Pokey"	The Just Dance Kids	1940
"Hold Still"	Yo Gabba Gabba!	2007
"I'm A Gummy Bear (The Gummy Bear Song)"	Gummibär	2007
"I'm Gonna Catch You"	Laurie Berkner	2002
"Intuition"	Selena Gomez & the Scene	2010
"Istanbul (Not Constantinople)"	The Four Lads	1953
"Itsy Bitsy Spider"	The Just Dance Kids	2011
"Jingle Bells" (Note: Another version of this song using the same music, singing voices and lyrics was featured on the Kids mode of Just Dance 2019.)	The Just Dance Kids (Note: Originally composed by James Lord Pierpont.)	1857
"Jump Up!"	Imagination Movers	2009
"Just the Way You Are"	Bruno Mars	2010
"The Lion Sleeps Tonight"	The Tokens	1961
"Lollipop"	The Chordettes	1958
"Love Me"	Justin Bieber	2009
"Mahna Mahna"	Piero Umiliani	1968
"On Our Way"	The Just Dance Kids	2011
"Party Goes Down"	The Just Dance Kids	2011
"Positivity"	Ashley Tisdale	2007
"The Robot Song"	Yo Gabba Gabba!	2008
"Rocketeer"	Far East Movement feat. Ryan Tedder	2010
"Shake Your Groove Thing"	Peaches & Herb	1978
"The Shimmie Shake!"	The Wiggles	2008
"Something That I Want"	Grace Potter	2010
"Song 2"	Blur	1997
"Start All Over"	Miley Cyrus	2007
"Summer School"	Twirl	2011
"Whip My Hair"	Willow Smith	2010

***All the songs included in the game excluding those by The Wiggles, Yo Gabba Gabba!, David Choi, Tyler Van Der Berg, and Twirl are a special cover version for the game, not the original.***
