= Just Dance (video game) =

2009 video game

- North American box art
- Developer: Ubisoft Paris
- Publisher: Ubisoft
- Series: Just Dance
- Platform: Wii
- Release: NA: 17 November 2009; AU: 26 November 2009; EU: 27 November 2009
- Genres: Music, rhythm
- Modes: Single-player, multiplayer

Just Dance is a 2009 music rhythm game developed by Ubisoft Paris and published by Ubisoft for the Wii. It is the first installment of the Just Dance series. An expansion of a concept introduced in a minigame for Rayman Raving Rabbids: TV Party, players mirror the motions of an on-screen dancer's choreography for a selected song, using the Wii Remote to judge the player's motions and accuracy as supposed to accessories such as physical dance pads.

Just Dance was released to mixed-to-unfavourable reviews. It was criticized for its simplistic gameplay, poor motion detection, and not including progression or additional content beyond what was included on-disc. At the same time, the simplistic gameplay of Just Dance was praised for being accessible to a casual audience, its "fun" soundtrack and dance routines, and for becoming more enjoyable as a multiplayer party game. Just Dance was a major commercial success, selling over 4.3 million copies worldwide and establishing a franchise that, as of November 2024, had collectively sold over 90 million units, making it Ubisoft's second-largest franchise.

== Gameplay ==
Gameplay of the track "Hot n Cold" in Just Dance

After selecting a song and either a short or full version of it, players are presented with an on-screen dancer, as well as an occasional display of scrolling pictograms/silhouettes representing specific poses. While holding a Wii Remote in their right hand, players follow the moves of the on-screen dancer and their choreographed routine. Players are judged by their animated score icons on a ranking scale for the accuracy of each of their moves in comparison to that of the on-screen dancer, and receive points. There are three judgements, "X", "OK" and "Great". The "X" means that the player did not copy the move, "OK" means that the player tried, but did not exactly copy the move or almost did it, and "Great" means the player copied the move exactly. Some moves are shake moves, where the shake meter appears in front of their animated score icons, giving the players a chance to shake their Wii Remotes as fast as they can to receive bonus points. There are two scoring targets for each song: 10,000 points for a Standard target, and 15,000 points for a Master target.

Along with standard play, three other modes are included; the "Warm Up" mode serves as a practice mode. In "Strike a Pose" mode, players are instructed at random to freeze (similar to red light green light). In "Last One Standing" mode, players are given seven lives; players lose lives on mistakes, and regain them after scoring five correct moves in a row; a player is eliminated if they lose all of their lives.

== Development ==
The concept of Just Dance originated from a minigame developed for inclusion in the Rayman Raving Rabbids series. Ubisoft France's managing director Xavier Poix and his team felt the Wii Remote and Nunchuk would work well for music games; Rayman Raving Rabbids 2 featured a music minigame that IGN compared to Guitar Hero, where players shook the Wii Remote or Nunchuk when prompted to play an instrument. For Rayman Raving Rabbids: TV Party, the concept was iterated into a pose-based dance game. Proving popular in demonstrations, the concept was refined and redeveloped into a stand-alone game.

Just Dance was developed by a small team of around 20 at Ubisoft Paris and was pitched six months prior to its eventual release. Poix explained that unlike the Raving Rabbids games, which he described as being a "gamer's game", Just Dance was designed to contrast skill-based rhythm games with a concept and control scheme that would be accessible to a mainstream audience, encouraging them to "[get] off the couch and [have] fun together". Ubisoft producer Florian Granger noted that Just Dance was designed to help players overcome their inhibitions and anxiety towards dance, helping them build a "vocabulary" of moves they can practice in a "safe context", and with the game itself being the focal point of attention rather than themselves. He reminisced that "everyone remembers going to a nightclub or school disco where it takes a couple of hours before anyone has the bottle to get up and dance. Most guys do the fix-placed-beer-bottle dance or neck-shake to the beat."

Creative director Gregoire Spillmann argued that dance games at the time had instructed players to press buttons with their feet, rather than actually dance. Acknowledging Dance Dance Revolution players who use its gameplay as a base for their own dance routines, Spiller likened Just Dance to be a reversal of the concept, in which the dance moves themselves were "fit" into the gameplay, and could be applied outside the game as well. The team deliberately focused on building the mechanics of Just Dance solely around the Wii Remote, rather than dedicated accessories such as dance pads, arm or leg bands, as well as the Nunchuk attachment. Spillmann explained that such accessories were "distractions" that restricted the motion of players; for instance, the team felt that the Nunchuk's short cord limited how it could be used in routines, and that removing it helped the game focus less on precision and more on letting players feel like they are dancing. The absence of dedicated peripheral also contrasted with other music games that utilized increasingly intricate and expensive controllers.

While Poix felt that his team had developed a game that could potentially become successful, his colleagues at Ubisoft Paris doubted Just Dance. Poix explained that "people thought it would never work, because people don't dance, or that it wasn't precise enough for people to actually learn to dance." Granger felt that the development team would be "cynical" of Just Dance due to the oversaturated market of casual games on the Wii, but noted that there was a "sense of excitement" among them, as it would be based upon a proven codebase, and used "respected" games such as Dance Dance Revolution as an example to build upon.

The game was also planned to be called We Dance, but Ubisoft renamed it to Just Dance in order to avoid confusion with a game with a similar title called We Dare (which was also created by Ubisoft).

== Soundtrack ==
Just Dance features a soundtrack consisting of 33 songs.

Song	Artist	Year
"A Little Less Conversation"	Elvis Presley vs. JXL	2002
"Acceptable in the 80s"	Calvin Harris	2007
"Bebe"	Divine Brown	2008
"Can't Get You Out of My Head"	Kylie Minogue	2001
"Cotton Eye Joe"	Rednex	1994
"Crispy Duck" (Note: Credited as "Warm Up". Not on the main soundtrack.)	John Brooks (Note: Credited as "Crispy Duck".)	2005
"Dare"	Gorillaz	2005
"Eye of the Tiger"	Survivor	1982
"Fame"	Irene Cara (credited as In the Style of Irene Cara)	1980
"Funplex (CSS Remix)"	The B-52s	2008
"Girls & Boys"	Blur	1994
"Girls Just Want to Have Fun" (Note: This song also appears on Just Dance 2026 Edition with a different routine)	Cyndi Lauper	1983
"Groove Is in the Heart"	Deee-Lite	1990
"Heart of Glass"	Blondie	1979
"Hot n Cold"	Katy Perry	2008
"I Get Around"	The Beach Boys	1964
"I Like to Move It"	Reel 2 Real featuring The Mad Stuntman	1993
"Jerk It Out"	Caesars	2002
"Jin-Go-Lo-Ba"	Fatboy Slim	2004
"Kids in America"	Kim Wilde	1981
"Le Freak"	Chic	1978
"Louie Louie"	Iggy Pop	1993
"Lump"	The Presidents of the United States of America	1995
"Mashed Potato Time"	Dee Dee Sharp	1962
"Pump Up the Jam"	Technotronic	1989
"Ring My Bell"	Anita Ward	1979
"Step by Step"	New Kids on the Block	1990
"Surfin' Bird"	The Trashmen	1963
"That's the Way (I Like It)"	KC and the Sunshine Band	1975
"U Can't Touch This"	MC Hammer	1990
"Wannabe" (Note: This song also appears on Just Dance: Decades of Hits with a different routine)	Spice Girls	1996
"Who Let the Dogs Out"	Baha Men	2000
"Womanizer"	The Gym All-Stars (as made famous by Britney Spears)	2008

== Reception ==
=== Reviews ===
Reception

Aggregate score
Aggregator	Score
Metacritic	49/100

Review scores
Publication	Score
GameSpot	5.5/10
IGN	2/10
Nintendo World Report	6.5/10

Just Dance received generally mixed-to-negative reviews from critics; Metacritic lists the game with an aggregate score of 49 out of 100 based on 21 critic reviews, indicating a "generally unfavorable" reception.

GameSpot was relatively positive, praising Just Dance for having simplistic gameplay, and remarking that its dance routines were both "fun" and "hilarious". However, the game's motion detection was considered "frustrating and unrewarding", and the game was also panned for its graphical quality, and its absence of career modes or downloadable content. In conclusion, giving the game a 5.5 out of 10, GameSpot felt that Just Dance would appeal best as a multiplayer party game, where players can "attempt the silly dances, laugh at each other's mistakes, and sing along to the cheesy pop tunes", but was "water-thin" as a single-player game.

Nintendo World Report felt that the game's soundtrack was "fun" but "cheesy" at times. The game's user interface was described as being "colorful" but minimalistic, while the appearance of the on-screen dancers were compared to iPod commercials. It was also noted that the pictograms additionally used to represent moves sometimes contradicted with the instructions implied to the player via the on-screen dancer, "making it look like timing relies on the pose you make rather than the movements you do", but that "once you 'get it', Just Dance becomes very enjoyable, very enduring, and extremely silly and fun." In conclusion, it was felt that Just Dance was "very rough but shows promise, especially when played with friends."

Sam Bishop of IGN felt that Just Dance was "an experience so devoid of depth or even basic game concepts that it would be considered a rip-off even if it was one of those Chinese knock-off systems masquerading as an existing console", further criticizing the game for its basic gameplay mechanics, "sloppy" motion detection, absence of variation or unlockable content, and not including the Lady Gaga song of the same name (which would be included on Just Dance 2014). The review concluded by urging readers not to buy, rent, or consider playing Just Dance, "lest someone at Ubisoft find out and they prep a Just Dance 2. Such would be the end of all things, mark my words."

=== Sales ===
In contrast to its critical reception, Just Dance was a major commercial success for Ubisoft; for a period, it was the top-selling video game in the United Kingdom, and in March 2010, Ubisoft announced that Just Dance had sold 2 million copies worldwide. In October 2010, the company announced that over 4.3 million copies of the game had been sold worldwide.

== Legacy ==
The success of Just Dance led to the development of a sequel, Just Dance 2, which focused on adding new features and refinements to the game, such as improvements to its motion tracking system, new game modes, and support for downloadable content. Sales of Just Dance 2 surpassed that of the original; with over 5 million copies by January 2011, it was the best-selling third-party title for the Wii. Laurent Detoc, CEO of Ubisoft's North American operations, stated that this achievement "[solidified] the Just Dance brand as a pop culture phenomenon." Poix felt that "there's a pressure within Ubisoft to keep Just Dance enormous, and we think we can make it enormous. But it wasn't like that initially, because at the end of the first one, people—even us—had our doubts that it would last. After the first one we thought maybe there would be a second one, and then it would be over."

The release of motion control accessories for the Wii's competitors in the seventh generation of video game consoles, PlayStation Move for PlayStation 3, and Kinect for Xbox 360, spawned competing motion-controlled dance games such as Dance Central, Dance Masters, Dance Paradise, and SingStar Dance. The 2010 Wii release of Dance Dance Revolution also added a mode combining its traditional dance pad gameplay with choreography gestures performed using the Wii Remote and Nunchuk; in its review, IGN declared that the dance pad had become "antiquated" by motion-controlled dance games.

Just Dance 3 introduced versions of the game for PS3 and Xbox 360, as well as Wii, and became the second best-selling video game overall of 2011, behind Call of Duty: Modern Warfare 3. Tony Key, Ubisoft's senior vice president of sales and marketing, complimented the success of Dance Central for proving the viability of dance games for Kinect, but iterated that as a brand, Just Dance had become "a juggernaut way beyond anything that any dance franchise has ever done." By November 2024, the Just Dance series had collectively sold over 90 million units, making it Ubisoft's second-largest franchise, behind Assassin's Creed.

The Just Dance series continued to be released on the Wii until Just Dance 2020 in 2019, a decade after the first game and six years after Nintendo discontinued support for the console.
