= Just Dance 2026 Edition =

2025 video game

- Original cover
- Developers: Ubisoft Paris; Ubisoft Pune; Ubisoft Shanghai; Ubisoft Kyiv; Ubisoft Bucharest
- Publisher: Ubisoft
- Series: Just Dance
- Engine: Unity
- Platforms: Nintendo Switch; PlayStation 5; Xbox Series X/S
- Release: October 14, 2025
- Genre: Rhythm
- Modes: Single-player, multiplayer

Just Dance 2026 Edition is a dance-controlled rhythm game developed and published by Ubisoft. It was revealed on July 31, 2025, during the Nintendo Direct: Partner Showcase July 2025 presentation as the seventeenth installment in the Just Dance series, and the fourth annual song pack after its three predecessors. It was released on October 14, 2025 for Nintendo Switch, PlayStation 5, and Xbox Series X/S.

== Gameplay ==
As with the previous installments of the franchise, players must mimic the on-screen coach's choreography to a chosen song using the game's associated smartphone app. Nintendo Switch players have the option to use the console's Joy-Con controllers, while the smartphone's camera can be used as a scoring method in single-player only, which is now out of beta. A new mode to the Just Dance hub, called "Party Mode", was announced as an addition to the game, in which features Dr. Gigavolt as the mode's main character, where players face various disturbances and actions during each song to reach a target percentage to pass the test. Each session features 5, 8 or 12 tests, consisting of short versions of every song from every Edition song pack as well as the Just Dance+ catalogue; "Gold Moves" are removed from this mode. Completing each session unlocks a reward, if available. The premise of this mode focuses on Gigavolt, a professor from the Just Dance Academy, who have been inspired by his father, who was a world champion dancer, after years of learning how to dance, he invented a machine that can teach him how to dance. And now, he needs dancers to test his experiment in order to make it work.

== Soundtrack ==
The following songs appear on Just Dance 2026 Edition:

Song	Artist	Year
"Abracadabra"	Lady Gaga	2025
"All Star"	Smash Mouth	1999
"Anxiety"	Doechii	2025
"APT."	Rosé and Bruno Mars	2024
"Azizam"	Ed Sheeran	2025
"Big Bad Frog"	Austin & Colin	2024
"Bluey Medley" (Note: Tie in to Bluey)	Bluey (Note: Composed by Joff Bush)	2025
"Born to Be Alive (Reborn Version)"	Patrick Hernandez	1978
"Chichika"	MariaDennis featuring Metamami	2025
"Counting Stars"	OneRepublic	2013
"Cry Baby"	Melanie Martinez	2015
"Don Raja"	Su Real and Distort	2019
"Don't Go Breaking My Heart"	Lulu & Levon (as made famous by Elton John and Kiki Dee)	1976
"Drip"	Babymonster	2024
"Feather"	Sabrina Carpenter	2023
"Girls Just Want to Have Fun" (Note: Appeared in Just Dance with a different routine)	Cyndi Lauper	1983
"Good Girls"	Zanillya and Humphrey Dennis	2025
"Good Luck, Babe!"	Chappell Roan	2024
"Houdini"	Dua Lipa	2023
"Hung Up"	Madonna	2005
"I Had Some Help"	Post Malone featuring Morgan Wallen	2024
"It's OK I'm OK"	Tate McRae	2024
"Kitipo"	Dixson Waz, La Tukiti, and Amenazandel	2022
"La Bamba"	The Sunlight Shakers (as made famous by Los Lobos)	1987
"Louder"	Don Elektron and Derek	2025
"Love Again"	Dua Lipa	2021
"Messy"	Lola Young	2024
"Moonlight"	Aileen-O	2025
"Pop Muzik"	M and Robin Scott	1979
"Prehistorock"	Ricky Stone	2025
"Rockin' Around the Christmas Tree"	Mrs. Claus and the Elves (as made famous by Brenda Lee)	1958
"Say Cheese"	Paul Russell	2024
"Show Me What You Got"	Boomborg	2025
"Sokusu"	Wanko Ni Mero Mero	2025
"Spin Your Love"	Kevin J. Simon	2025
"Strangers"	Sigrid	2017
"Thrift Shop"	Macklemore & Ryan Lewis featuring Wanz	2012
"Viva la Vida"	Coldplay	2008
"We Just Begun"	Stush and Wost	2020
"Zombieboy"	Lady Gaga	2025

=== Just Dance+ ===
Just Dance+ continues to be offered on 2026 Edition, offering recently ported songs from previous Just Dance games, as well as songs exclusive to the service.

Songs exclusive to the service include:

Song	Artist	Year	Release date
"Money Pull Up"	Blaiz Fayah, Maureen & DJ Glad	2024	January 20, 2026
"360"	Charli XCX	2024	February 24, 2026
"Birds of a Feather"	Billie Eilish	2024	March 31, 2026
"Gnarly"	Katseye	2025	April 28, 2026
"Folded" (Note: Also included in the Wonder Tales Song Pack)	Kehlani	2025	May 12, 2026
"Mystical Magical"	Benson Boone	2025	May 12, 2026
"World Eater"	Ashnikko	2023	May 12, 2026
"In the End"	Linkin Park	2001	June 23, 2026
"Water"	Tyla	2023	July 28, 2026
"Where Is My Husband!"	Raye	2025	August 25, 2026

== Reception ==
Reception

Aggregate score
Aggregator	Score		
Aggregator	NS	PS5	Xbox Series X/S
Metacritic	74/100	82/100	75/100

Review scores
Publication	Score		
Publication	NS	PS5	Xbox Series X/S
games.ch			71%
Generación Xbox			78/100
Movies Games and Tech			7/10
XboxEra			7.5/10
TheXboxHub			4/5
