= Just Dance Kids (2010 video game) =

- North American box art
- Developer: Land Ho!
- Publisher: Ubisoft
- Series: Just Dance
- Platform: Wii
- Release: NA: November 9, 2010; AU: February 3, 2011; EU: February 4, 2011
- Genres: Music, rhythm
- Modes: Single player, multiplayer

Just Dance Kids (released as simply Dance Juniors in Europe and Australia) is a 2010 video game for the Wii developed by Japanese studio Land Ho!, and is part of Ubisoft's Just Dance franchise. Just Dance Kids is a dance-based music game with an emphasis on songs that are popular with children. The game was released on November 9, 2010, in North America, February 3, 2011, in Australia, and February 4, 2011, in Europe.

== Gameplay ==
The game is identical to the other games in Ubisoft's franchise, Just Dance. Players are required to perform specific dance moves in time with the music, following a routine indicated on-screen by any three live-action dancers. Animated score icons judge how the players did the move. Like the original Just Dance, the game also includes shake moves, where players shake their Wii Remotes when the shake meter appears. If the player performs well, by dancing accurately and in time, their score will build, and their ranking is obtained upon completion of the song.

There are two other game modes, Team High Scores, and Freeze & Shake. Team High Scores mode has up to two teams of two dance together and allows one player to shake their Wii Remote when the spotlight hits them. And Freeze & Shake mode has players stop moving when the stop sign appears in addition to just shake moves.

== Track listing ==
The game contains 42 songs.

Song	Artist	Year
"ABC"	The Jackson 5	1970
"All Star"	Smash Mouth	1999
"Alphabet Song"	The Just Dance Kids	1835
"Ants Go Marching"	The Just Dance Kids	1990
"Beautiful Life"	Ace of Base	1995
"Bingo"	The Just Dance Kids	1929
"Can You (Point Your Fingers And Do the Twist?)"	The Wiggles	1995
"Celebration"	Kool & the Gang	1980
"The Chicken Dance"	The Just Dance Kids	1950
"Funkytown"	Lipps Inc	1980
"Get The Sillies Out"	Yo Gabba Gabba!	2007
"Gonna Make You Sweat (Everybody Dance Now)"	C+C Music Factory feat. Freedom Williams	1990
"The Hamster Dance Song"	Hampton the Hampster	2000
"Happy Birthday to You"	The Just Dance Kids	1893
"Haven't Met You Yet"	Michael Bublé	2009
"Here We Go Again"	Demi Lovato	2009
"Holiday"	Madonna	1983
"Hot, Hot, Hot"	Buster Poindexter	1987
"Hot Potato"	The Wiggles	1994
"I Like To Dance"	Yo Gabba Gabba!	2007
"I Wanna B With U"	Fun Factory	1995
"If You're Happy and You Know It"	The Just Dance Kids	1900
"I've Been Working on The Railroad"	The Just Dance Kids	1894
"Jungle Boogie"	Kool & the Gang	1973
"Kids in America"	Kim Wilde	1981
"Kung Fu Fighting"	Carl Douglas	1974
"Macarena"	Los Del Río	1996
"Magic"	Pilot	1974
"Mickey"	Toni Basil	1982
"MMMBop"	Hanson	1997
"The Monkey Dance"	The Wiggles	1994
"Naturally"	Selena Gomez & the Scene	2009
"Old MacDonald Had a Farm"	The Just Dance Kids	1917
"One Time"	Justin Bieber	2009
"Party in My Tummy"	Yo Gabba Gabba!	2007
"Pop Goes the Weasel"	The Just Dance Kids	1994
"Shake It"	Metro Station	2008
"Surfin’ U.S.A."	The Beach Boys	1963
"Wheels on the Bus"	The Just Dance Kids	1898
"When The Saints Go Marching In"	James Milton Black	1896
"Who Let the Dogs Out?"	Baha Men	2000
"Y.M.C.A."	Village People	1978

All the songs included in the game excluding those by The Wiggles and Yo Gabba Gabba! are a special cover version for the game, not the original.
