= Just Dance 2024 Edition =

2023 video game

- Developers: Ubisoft Paris; Ubisoft Bucharest; Ubisoft Mumbai; Ubisoft Pune; Ubisoft Shanghai; Ubisoft Kyiv
- Publisher: Ubisoft
- Series: Just Dance
- Engine: Unity
- Platforms: Nintendo Switch; PlayStation 5; Xbox Series X/S
- Release: October 24, 2023
- Genre: Rhythm
- Modes: Single-player; Multiplayer

Just Dance 2024 Edition is a 2023 dance rhythm game developed and published by Ubisoft. It was unveiled on June 12, 2023 during the Ubisoft Forward June 2023 presentation as the fifteenth installment in the series and the second annual song pack after its predecessor Just Dance 2023 Edition. The game was released on October 24, 2023 for Nintendo Switch, PlayStation 5, and Xbox Series X/S.

== Gameplay ==
As with the previous installments of the franchise, players must mimic the on-screen coach’s choreography to a chosen song using the game's associated smartphone app (Nintendo Switch players have the option to use the console's Joy-Con controllers). 2024 Edition retains all of the features from 2023 Edition, but introduces new features within the Just Dance hub, such as "Song Sharing", which allows players from any Edition to share songs with each other. All owners of any Edition have access to all Just Dance+ songs and updates. Camera scoring returns to the series as a feature in the game's smartphone app that utilizes the front-facing camera, first launched as a beta for iOS in December 2023 and Android in June 2024, and supporting a limited number of songs from 2023 and 2024 Edition in single player mode. Custom playlists returned on June 18, 2024, the same day that Season 3: Lights Out was released.

== Story mode ==
Gameplay of "Tainted Love", where Sara, Wanderlust, Brezziana, and Mihaly are corrupted by Night Swan

A follow-up to the "Enter the Danceverses" story playlist in 2023 Edition, titled "Dance with the Swan", is part of the game.

Following her defeat in the previous story, Night Swan begins her revenge plot. She steals Wanderlust's anthropomorphic disco ball, then uses it to kidnap Sara from the real world and corrupt her using her magic. She also uses the ball to attack Brezziana and Mihaly within their own worlds, and attempts to persuade her son, Jack Rose, back into her side by showing him a vision in which he rules over their world. Wanderlust, Brezziana, and Mihaly travel to Night Swan's world to rescue Sara, but all of them become corrupted and are taken into Night Swan's ship as her servants. Despite this, Mihaly is able to send a distress signal to Jack, who fails to reach the ship in time before it departs regardless.

== Soundtrack ==
The following songs appear on Just Dance 2024 Edition:

Song	Artist	Year
"A Night in the Château de Versailles" (Note: A remix of "Marche pour la cérémonie des Turcs" by Jean-Baptiste Lully and "Forêts paisables" by Jean-Philippe Rameau)	The Just Dance Orchestra	2023
"A Queda"	Gloria Groove	2021
"After Party"	Banx & Ranx featuring Zach Zoya	2023
"Butter"	BTS	2021
"Calm Down"	Rema	2022
"Canned Heat" (Note: Made available for all players in the Just Dance 2024 Edition Celebration Event) (Note: Also part of the "Dance with the Swan" playlist)	Jamiroquai	1999
"Can't Tame Her"	Zara Larsson	2023
"Chaise Longue"	Wet Leg	2021
"Cradles"	Sub Urban	2019
"Cure for Me"	Aurora	2021
"Despechá"	Rosalía	2022
"Don't Cha"	The Pussycat Dolls featuring Busta Rhymes	2005
"Flowers"	Miley Cyrus	2023
"Gimme More"	Britney Spears	2007
"How You Like That"	Blackpink	2020
"I Am My Own Muse"	Fall Out Boy	2023
"I Wanna Dance with Somebody (Who Loves Me)"	Whitney Houston	1987
"I'm Good (Blue)"	David Guetta and Bebe Rexha	2022
"I'm Not Here to Make Friends"	Sam Smith	2023
"It's the Most Wonderful Time of the Year"	Andy Williams	1963
"Kill Bill"	SZA	2023
"Makeba"	Jain	2015
"My Name Is"	D-Billions	2020
"Never Be Like You"	Flume featuring Kai	2016
"Rapper's Delight"	Groove Century (as made famous by The Sugarhill Gang)	1979
"Sail" (Note: Available for free on Just Dance+ for a limited time from June 12 to June 21, 2023, as part of the 2024 Edition announcement.)	Awolnation	2010
"Say My Name"	Ateez	2019
"Seven"	Jungkook featuring Latto	2023
"Shine a Little Love"	The Sunlight Shakers (as made famous by Electric Light Orchestra)	1979
"Stronger (What Doesn't Kill You)"	Kelly Clarkson	2012
"Survivor"	Destiny's Child	2001
"Swan Lake"	The Just Dance Orchestra (as made famous by Pyotr Ilyich Tchaikovsky)	1877
"Tainted Love"	The Just Dancers (as made famous by Gloria Jones)	1965
"This Wish"	Ariana DeBose	2023
"Tití Me Preguntó"	Bad Bunny	2022
"Treasure"	Bruno Mars	2013
"Vampire"	Olivia Rodrigo	2023
"Wasabi"	Little Mix	2018
"Whitney"	Rêve	2022
"Woof"	Sofi Tukker featuring Kah-Lo	2023
"You Should See Me in a Crown"	Billie Eilish	2018

=== Just Dance+ ===
Just Dance+ continues to be offered on 2024 Edition, offering recently ported songs from previous Just Dance games, as well as songs exclusive to the service.

Songs exclusive to the service include:

Song	Artist	Year	Release date
"A Whole New World" (Note: Season 1: Disney Magical Time)	Brad Kane and Lea Salonga	1992	December 5, 2023
"Zero to Hero"	Disney's Hercules	1997	December 5, 2023
"When Will My Life Begin?"	Mandy Moore	2010	January 9, 2024
"I'll Make a Man Out of You"	Donny Osmond	1998	January 9, 2024
"Otonablue" (Note: Also available as a Japanese-exclusive track on the soundtrack)	Atarashii Gakko!	2020	January 30, 2024
"Boy's a Liar Pt. 2" (Note: Season 2: Y2K)	PinkPantheress and Ice Spice	2023	February 27, 2024
"Hollaback Girl"	Gwen Stefani	2005	February 27, 2024
"Sk8er Boi"	Avril Lavigne	2002	March 26, 2024
"Greedy"	Tate McRae	2023	March 26, 2024
"Darkest Hour" (Note: Night Swan: The Prequel)	The Rising Swan	2024	May 14, 2024
"Murder on the Dancefloor"	Sophie Ellis-Bextor	2001	May 14, 2024
"Don't Rush" (Note: Season 3: Lights Out) (Note: Free for a limited time from June 18 to July 15)	Young T & Bugsey featuring Headie One	2019	June 11, 2024
"Todo de Ti"	Rauw Alejandro	2021	June 11, 2024
"Paparazzi" (Note: Free for a limited time from July 16 to August 12)	Lady Gaga	2009	July 9, 2024
