= Kia Soul =

Boxy subcompact crossover hatchback (2008-2025)

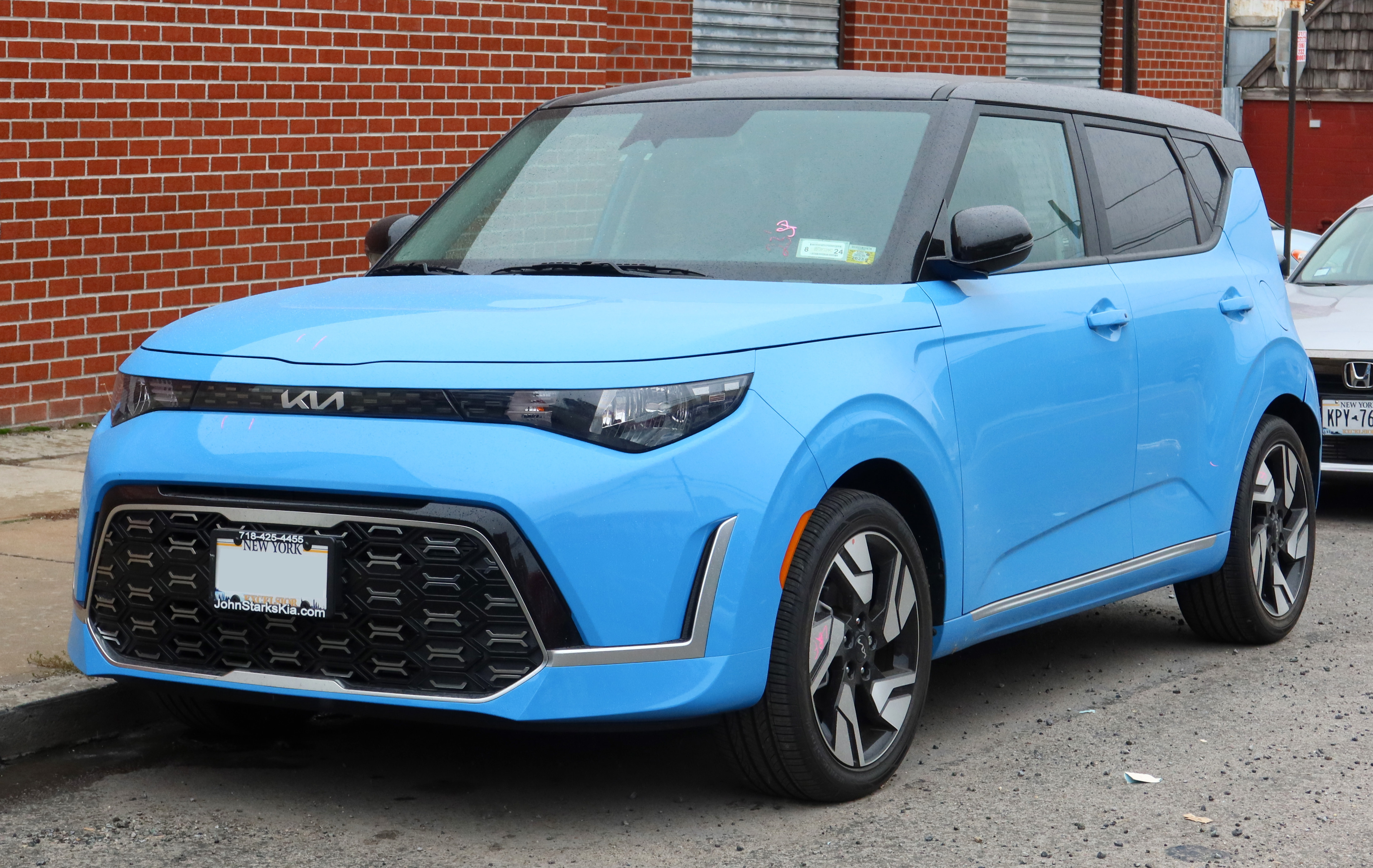
- 2023 Kia Soul GT-Line

Overview
- Manufacturer: Kia
- Production: 2008–2025
- Model years: 2009–2025

Body and chassis
- Class: Subcompact crossover SUV
- Body style: 5-door hatchback
- Layout: Front-engine, front-wheel-drive

The Kia Soul (Korean: 기아 쏘울) is a subcompact crossover hatchback manufactured and marketed by Kia, produced from 2008 to 2025, in over three generations.

Marketed as a crossover since its introduction, the Soul was a five-door, five-passenger hatchback with boxy proportions and a tall roof, maximizing interior space. However, despite its crossover-like styling, it was exclusively offered with front-wheel drive.

In a period when small, boxy cars would come to populate the compact U.S. market, prominently the Scion xB (2004-2015), Honda Element (2003–2011) and Nissan Cube (2009–2014), Kia presented the Kia Soul Concept in 2006 at the North American International Auto Show in Detroit and presented the production model at the 2008 Paris Motor Show — aiming for the North American market and targeting buyers in the 18-35 year-old range.

The second-generation model was introduced in 2013 for the 2014 model year, with slightly larger exterior and interior dimensions and a reworked chassis, while retaining its boxy styling.

In 2018, Kia introduced the third-generation Soul for model year 2019.

Between 2014 and 2024, Kia also offered a battery electric variant as the Soul EV.

The nameplate Soul doubles as a homophone of Seoul, the city that hosts Kia's headquarters.

== Conception ==
Designed at the Kia Design Center in California, the Soul concept was styled by Michael Torpey (1972-2020) in early 2005, working with Kia's U.S. Design Chief, Thomas Kearns, under the leadership of Kia's global Chief Design Officer, Peter Schreyer.

Having previously worked with General Motors and as a new member of Kia's design team in Irvine, California, Torpey was sent to Kia's Namyang Design Center in Korea to help brainstorm a new vehicle. After watching a documentary on Korean wildlife, Torpey saw that the wild boar embodied a set of qualities that could inspire the design of a small, boxy car, and drew numerous sketches of a boar with outdoor gear, including a backpack — leading to his design for the 2006 Kia Soul Concept with a tough, compact stance. The New York Times reported, "the boar's attitude of strength and capability was the image [Torpey] wanted for a new model aimed at hip urban youth."

United States design patent drawings were filed in 2004, attributing the design to Yongpil Jang.

== First generation (AM; 2008) ==
First generation
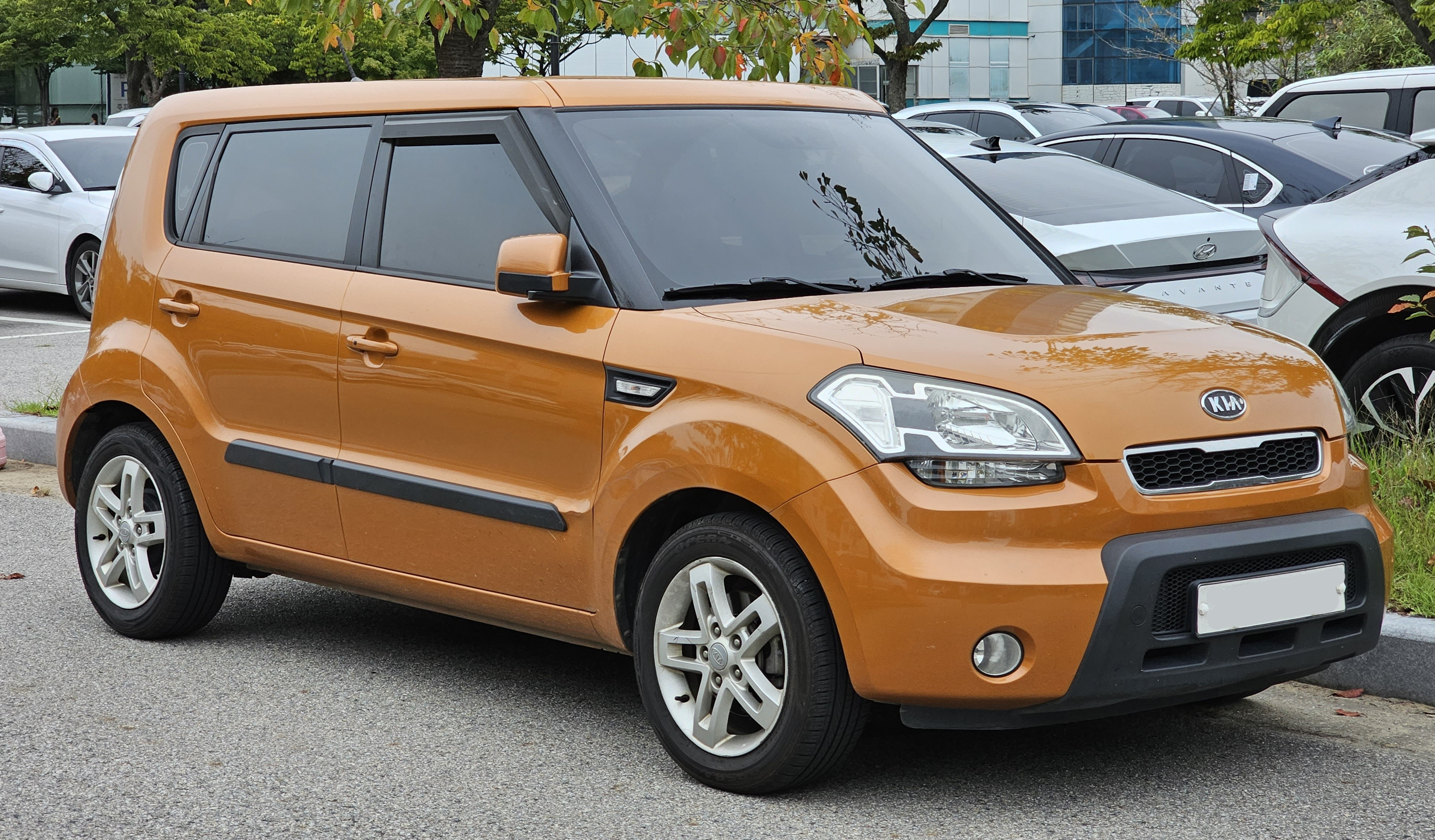
- pre-facelift

Overview
- Model code: AM
- Production: 2008–2013
- Model years: 2010–2013 (US)
- Assembly: South Korea: Gwangju (Gwangju Plant); China: Yancheng, Jiangsu (DYK); Russia: Kaliningrad (Avtotor); Kazakhstan: Oskemen (Azia Avto)
- Designer: Michael Torpey (1972-2020)(Concept)

Body and chassis
- Platform: Hyundai-Kia PB
- Related: Kia Rio (UB)

Powertrain
- Engine: Gasoline: 1.6 L Gamma MPi I4; 1.6 L Gamma GDi; 2.0 L Beta II I4; 2.0 L Nu MPi I4; 2.0 L Nu GDi I4; Diesel: 1.6 L U II CRDi I4
- Transmission: 5-speed manual; 6-speed manual; 4-speed automatic; 6-speed automatic

Dimensions
- Wheelbase: 2,550 mm (100.4 in)
- Length: 4,105–4,120 mm (161.6–162.2 in)
- Width: 1,785 mm (70.3 in)
- Height: 1,610 mm (63.4 in)
- Curb weight: 1,170–1,336 kg (2,579–2,945 lb)

Once in production, the Soul's interior plastics and a harsh ride became points of criticism, and both were upgraded during the first year of production.

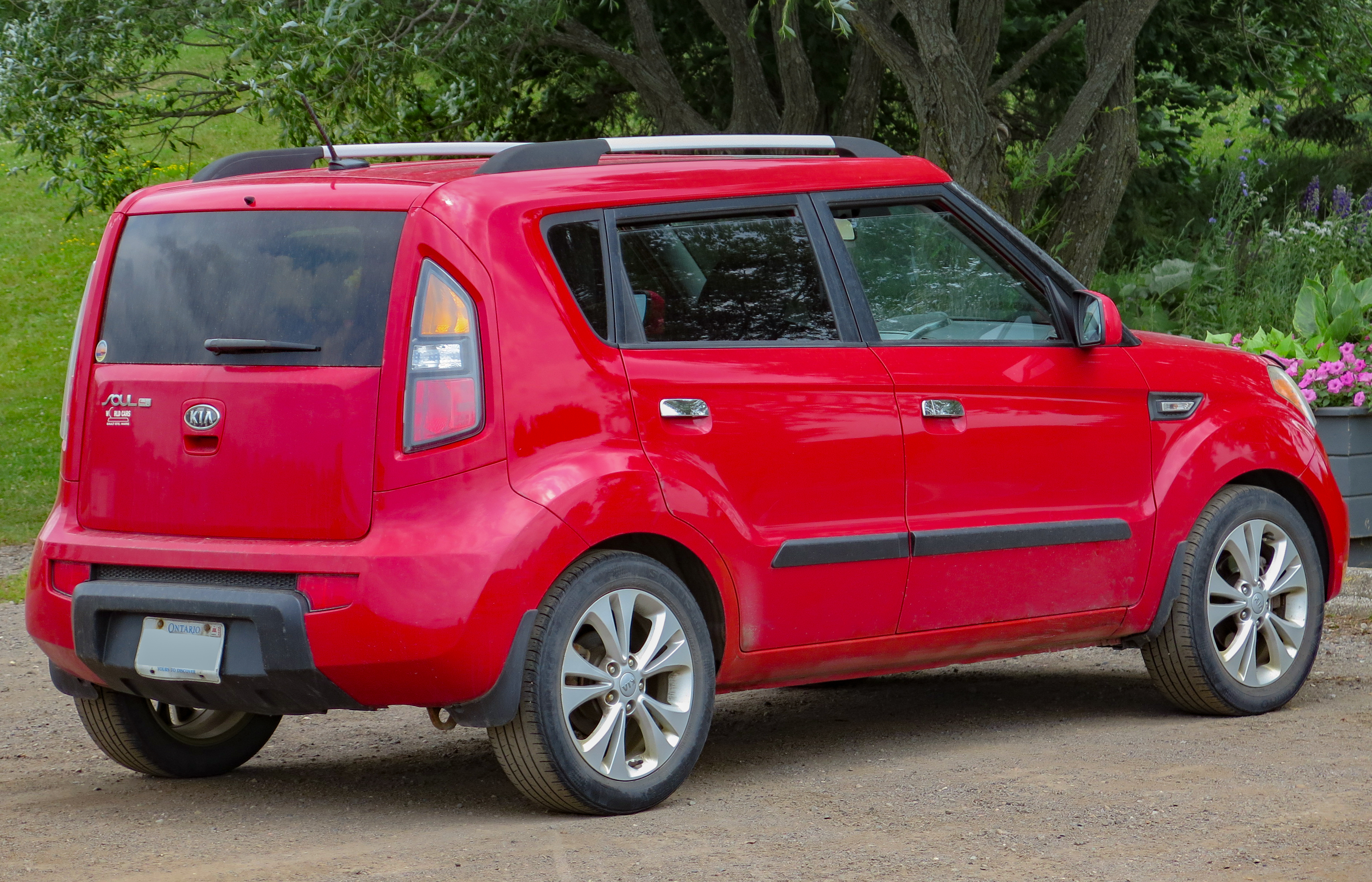
pre-facelift

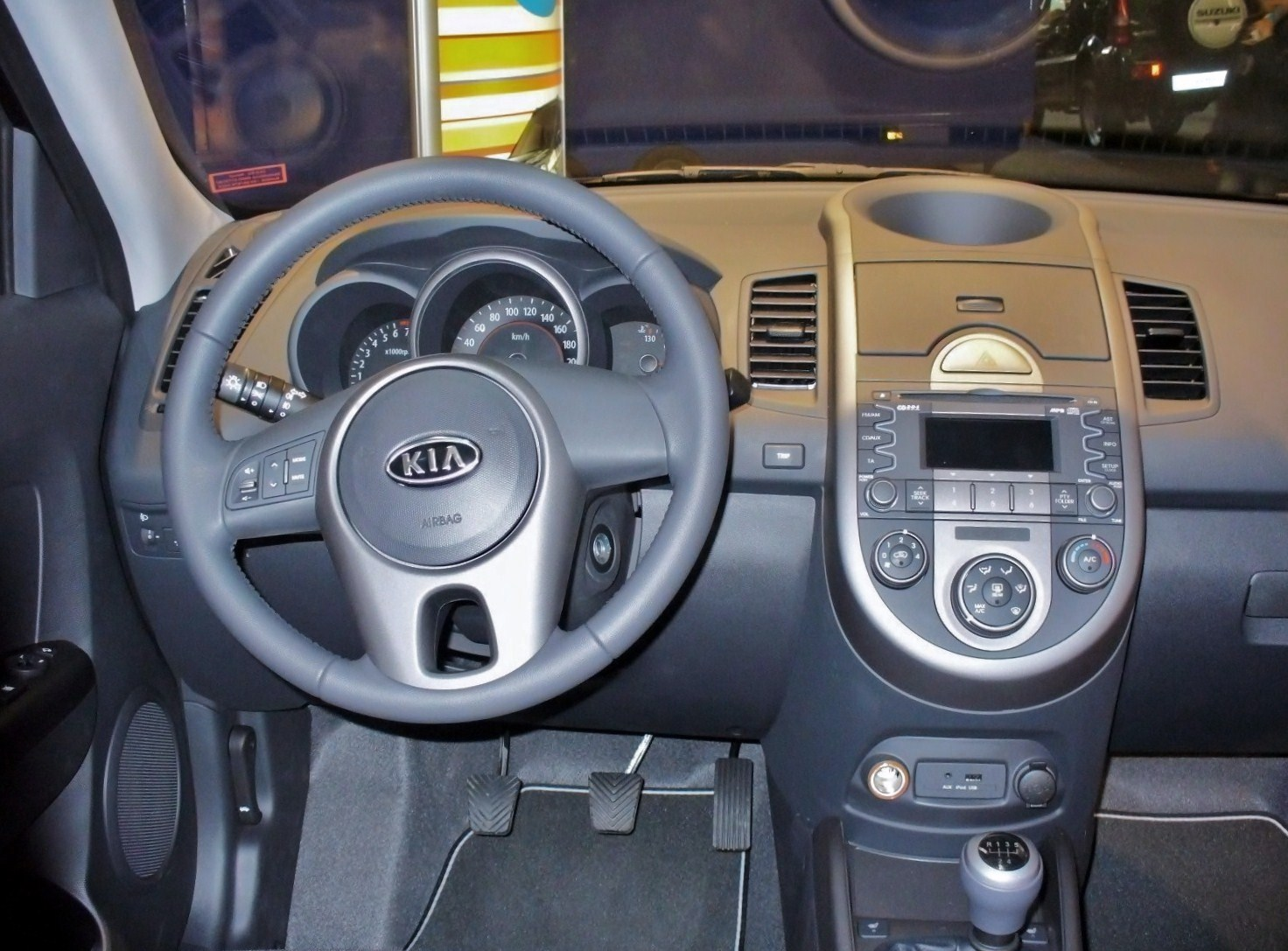
Interior

=== Equipment ===
The interior featured two front bucket seats and a rear flat-folding bench seat, the latter adjustable to prioritize passenger or cargo volume.

Standard equipment included a stereo audio system with six-speakers, CD player, USB port, and Sirius Satellite Radio. Optional audio equipment included additional speakers, steering-wheel-mounted audio controls and Bluetooth connectivity.

Options included themed special editions as well as 18-inch alloy wheels, cruise control, leather-wrapped steering wheel, racing stripes, "dragon" and "houndstooth" graphics, and LED turn indicators.

For 2011, the Soul was updated with more conventional pull-out door handles, standard metallic interior trim, redesigned instrument cluster, leather shift boot, and switchblade style fold-in integrated key and remote, with an optional Smart Key available in the Exclaim ("!") trim.

For model year 2012, the Soul received revised exterior and interior styling and new powertrains. In North America the updated 1.6 liter engine, featuring direct injection, makes 138 hp (103 kW) and 123 lb⋅ft (167 N⋅m); the 2.0 liter engine makes 164 hp (122 kW) and 148 lb⋅ft (201 N⋅m) of torque. The 1.6 now delivers 9.4–9.0 L/100 km; 30–31 mpg_{‑imp} (25–26 mpg_{‑US}) in the city and 7.8–7.6 L/100 km; 36–37 mpg_{‑imp} (30–31 mpg_{‑US}) on the highway. The 2.0 returns 10.2–9.8 L/100 km; 28–29 mpg_{‑imp} (23–24 mpg_{‑US}) in the city and 8.4–8.1 L/100 km; 34–35 mpg_{‑imp} (28–29 mpg_{‑US}) on the highway. New features included navigation, UVO infotainment, leather and heated seats and automatic climate control.

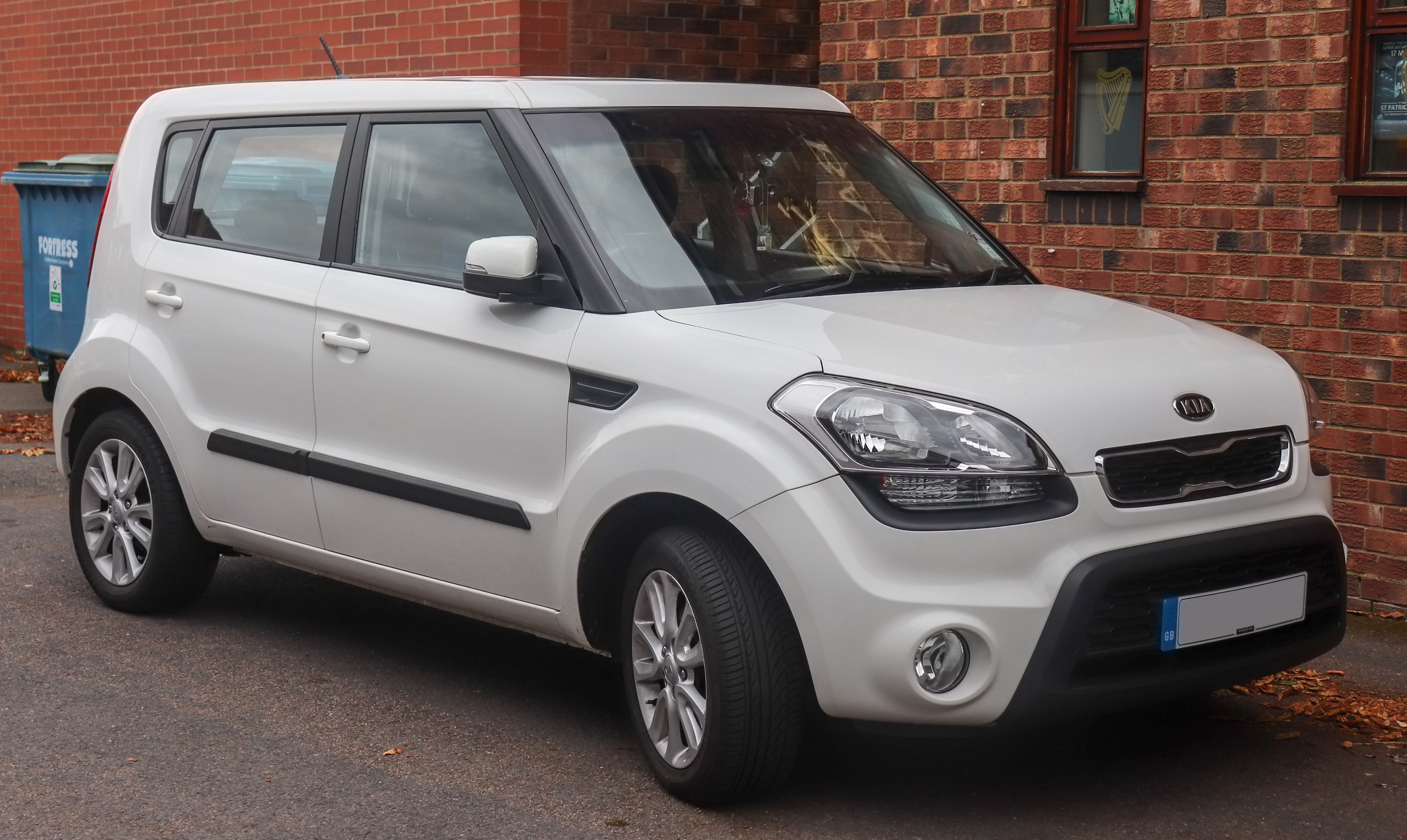
Facelift

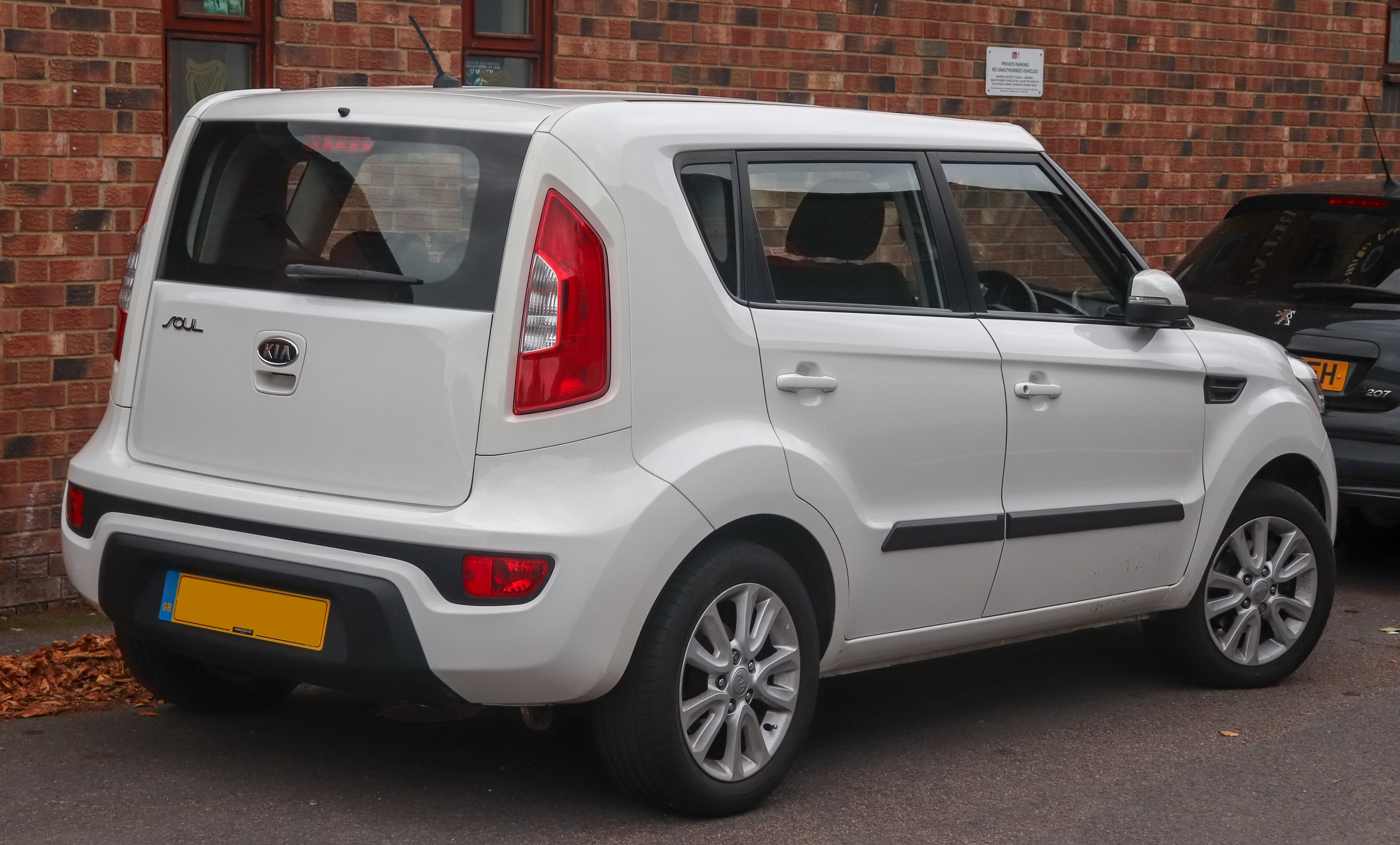
Facelift

As part of the 2012 upgrades, European models were fitted with new 1.6-liter GDI gasoline or 1.6 CRDi diesel engines, both of which can be specified with an automatic gearbox or a new six-speed manual gearbox, replacing the five-speed unit in the old version. As a result, the gasoline offers a 10 kW (14 bhp) increase in power compared to its predecessor, while returning improved fuel economy. The modified 1.6 CRDi diesel returns 4.90 L/100 km; 48.0 mpg_{‑US} (57.6 mpg_{‑imp}) and has cut its CO_{2} emissions from 138 g/km to 129g/km – particularly important for the European market where taxation is based on carbon emissions.

The 2013 North American Soul received upgrades including 3 new colors, a bulged hood, revised grille with black chrome accents, LED red tail lights, LED amber front turn signals under the headlights and white LED running lights under the front turn signals. The exterior Kia badges became now smooth instead of raised lettering. Inside, audio controls were relocated to the steering wheel and Bluetooth became standard across the range. Upper trims included power folding heated mirrors with turn signal repeaters. The center display for sound system was previously red LED and was revised to include a full color range.

=== Special editions ===
Kia offered four Special Edition Soul in 2010: Denim (below), Ignition, Dragon (below), and Ghost as primarily visual upgrades.

Soul Denim (2010)

The Denim is a limited (1200 units) version of 2010 Soul+ for the US market. Appearing in June 2009, it features a blue body color with white racing stripes, white painted side-view mirrors, and white, 18-inch, lead wheels.

Soul Ignition (2010)

The Kia Ignition Soul, in orange, is based on the Soul+ model with offset black striping and blacked-out 18-inch rims, an alloy gas cap, and a rear spoiler. Upgraded equipment according to AutoBlog: upgraded stereo, moon roof, keyless remote entry, tinted windows, cruise control, Bluetooth, and then some.

Soul Dragon (2010)

The Shadow Dragon edition is based on the Soul trim line and was limited to about 1,900 units. Exterior details include shadow black paint with matte-black dragon graphics on its hood and tailgate, gloss-black bumper inserts, a body-color rear wing and 18 inch black alloy wheels. The interior features heated, black leather trimmed seats.

Soul Ghost (2010)

Referred to as Ghost Soul by Car And Driver, the visual upgrades include gray-blue paint with a gray stripe running from the headlights to the C-pillar, unique 18-inch wheels, side-marker lights on the fender vents, and a new body kit with a rear spoiler. The special edition augments the Soul + trim with equipment usually only available on the pricier ! and Sport models with upgrades that include fog lights, a sunroof, a leather-wrapped steering wheel and shift knob, heated leather seats, and chrome interior trim. They also state it includes an audio upgrade comprising an amplifier, subwoofer, and pulsing lights around each speaker.

The Soul White Tiger (2011)

The Soul White Tiger Special Edition was showcased at the 2010 SEMA and comes with features such as Clear White with Grey exterior graphics, body colored bumpers, sport rear spoiler, black 18-inch alloy wheels, black fender vents with side marker repeater, rear bumper applique, alloy fuel door, black leather seat trim, heated front seats, leather wrapped steering wheel and shift knob, push button start with smart key, illuminated sill plates, automatic climate control and front fog lights. There were some differences between the concept car presented in 2010 and the final 2011 production version, though what these were, were only hinted at in the article on TheKEEA.com.

Soul Flex (2010)

Kia presented the Soul Flex at the 2010 São Paulo International Auto Show. The Soul Flex is the first Korean flexible-fuel vehicle capable of running on any blend from E20-E25 gasoline (mandatory Brazilian blend) to E100 (neat ethanol). The new Soul Flex delivers a 44% improvement in fuel efficiency compared with the existing gasoline model, as well as superior power and torque.

=== Powertrain ===
The North American version of the Soul was initially available in 2010 and 2011 with one of two inline four-cylinder gasoline engines. The base model is powered by a 1.6-liter unit producing 122 bhp (91 kW) and mated exclusively with a five-speed manual transmission. Higher trims feature a 2.0-liter unit producing 142 bhp (106 kW) connected to a standard five-speed manual transmission with a four-speed automatic available as a stand-alone option. A 1.6-liter diesel engine producing 126 PS (93 kW; 124 hp) and 260 N⋅m (192 lb⋅ft) torque is offered in European models instead of the 2.0-liter gas, mated to a five-speed manual gearbox.

For the 2012 model, the Soul received two new transmissions and a new engine: 6-speed manual and 6-speed automatic transmissions replaced the old choices, and the new 2.0-liter Nu engine replacing the old Beta engine; the 1.6-liter Gamma engine remained as the base model choice. The Gamma 1.6 gets a new dual variable valve timing 128 hp (95 kW), and in some countries, gets a direct injection fuel system.

Specs
Model	Years	Transmission	Power@rpm	Torque@rpm	0–100 km/h (0–62 mph) (Official)	Top Speed	Notes
1.6 Gamma MPI	2008–2011	5-speed manual 4-speed automatic	93 kW (126 PS; 124 hp) @ 6,300 rpm	156 N⋅m; 115 lb⋅ft @ 4,200 rpm	11.0s (Manual)	177 km/h (110 mph) (Manual); 162 km/h (101 mph) (Automatic)	
1.6 Gamma MPI	2008–2011	5-speed manual 4-speed automatic	91 kW (124 PS; 122 hp) @ 6,300 rpm	156 N⋅m; 115 lb⋅ft @ 4,200 rpm	n/a	n/a	North America
1.6 Gamma MPI	2012–2013	6-speed manual 6-speed automatic	95 kW (129 PS; 127 hp) @ 6,300 rpm	157 N⋅m (116 lb⋅ft; 16 kg⋅m) @ 4,850 rpm			128 hp in North America
1.6 Gamma GDi	2012–2013	6-speed manual 6-speed automatic	103 kW (140 PS; 138 hp) @ 6,300 rpm	167 N⋅m; 123 lb⋅ft @ 4,850 rpm	10.4s (Manual); 10.9s (Automatic)	180 km/h (112 mph)	
2.0 Beta II	2008–2011	5-speed manual 4-speed automatic	104 kW (142 PS; 140 hp) @ 6,000 rpm	186 N⋅m; 137 lb⋅ft @ 4,600 rpm			
2.0 Nu MPI	2012–2013	6-speed manual	122 kW (166 PS; 164 hp) @ 6,500 rpm	201 N⋅m; 148 lb⋅ft @ 4,800 rpm			
1.6 U CRDi	2008–2011	5-speed manual 4-speed automatic	94 kW (128 PS; 126 hp) @ 4,000 rpm	260 N⋅m; 192 lb⋅ft @ 1,900–2,750 rpm	11.3s (Manual); 11.9s (Automatic)	182 km/h (113 mph) (Manual); 176 km/h (109 mph) (Automatic)	
1.6 U2 CRDi	2011–2013	6-speed manual 6-speed automatic	94 kW (128 PS; 126 hp) @ 4,000 rpm	260 N⋅m; 192 lb⋅ft @ 1,900–2,750 rpm	10.7s (Manual); 11.7s (Automatic)	180 km/h (112 mph) (Manual); 177 km/h (110 mph) (Automatic)	

=== Safety ===
The Soul earned a maximum five star safety rating from Euro NCAP. In 2009, According to Euro NCAP, the five star safety rating places the Soul among the safest B-segment family cars in the world. The Soul was awarded the maximum five star safety rating by the Australasian New Car Assessment Program (ANCAP), but only on the New Zealand version. Australian versions get 4 out of 5 stars.

IIHS scores
Moderate overlap frontal offset	Good
Small overlap frontal offset	Poor
Side impact	Good
Roof strength	Good
Head restraints & seats	Good

Euro NCAP test results for a LHD, 5-door hatchback variant on a 2009 registration:

Euro NCAP test results* Kia Soul (2009)
Test	Points	%
Overall:	5 /5 stars	
Adult occupant:	31.2	75%
Child occupant:	42	86%
Pedestrian:	13.9	39%
Safety assist:	6	86%

ANCAP test results* Kia Soul Australian model (2009)
Test	Score
Overall	4 /5 stars
Frontal offset	13.11/16
Side impact	15/16
Pole	0/2
Seat belt reminders	1/3
Whiplash protection	Not Assessed
Pedestrian protection	Marginal
Electronic stability control	Optional

ANCAP test results* Kia Soul all variants (2010)
Test	Score
Overall	5 /5 stars
Frontal offset	13.11/16
Side impact	15/16
Pole	2/2
Seat belt reminders	3/3
Whiplash protection	Not Assessed
Pedestrian protection	Marginal
Electronic stability control	Standard

ANCAP test results* Kia Soul New Zealand model (2009)
Test	Score
Overall	5 /5 stars
Frontal offset	13.11/16
Side impact	15/16
Pole	2/2
Seat belt reminders	3/3
Whiplash protection	Not Assessed
Pedestrian protection	Marginal
Electronic stability control	Standard

=== Concepts ===
Soul Concept (2006)

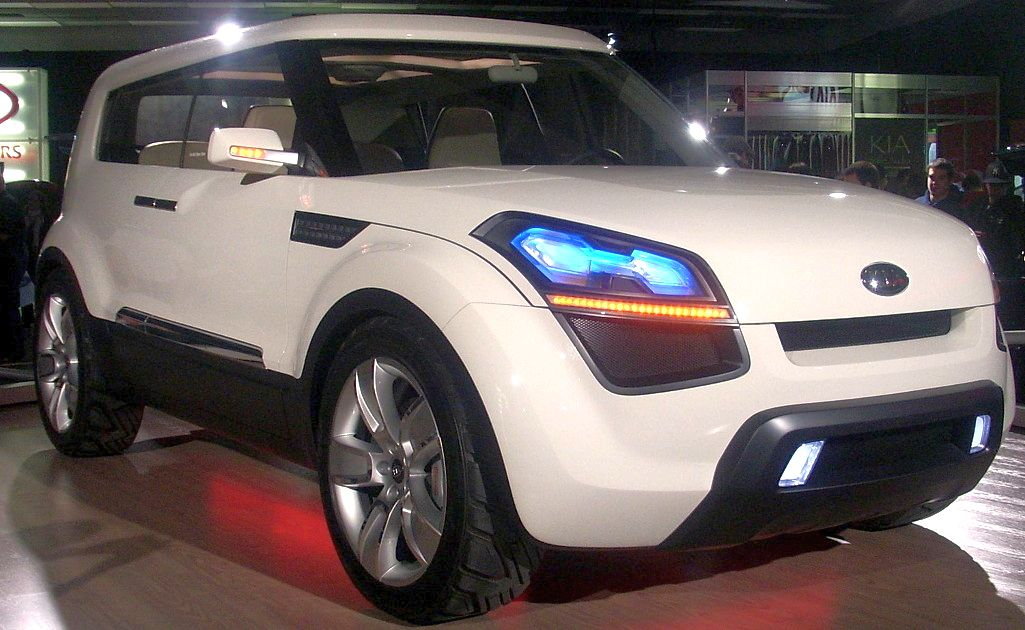
Kia Soul Concept, January 2008

The design of the Soul concept was based on the Kia Mesa concept and it was initially introduced as a compact crossover with a 5-door SUV body styling with five seats and suicide doors. It included a 2.0-liter I4 engine, 5-speed automatic transmission with manual shift capability and adaptive cruise control.

The vehicle was unveiled at the 2006 North American International Auto Show in Detroit, Michigan.

By late 2008, Kia announced it would put the car into production as a 2009 model.

Soul Burner, Diva, Searcher (2008)

The Soul Burner, Diva, and Searcher are concept vehicles, created by Kia's European design team, under the guidance of Kia's Chief Design Officer, Peter Schreyer.

The Soul Diva was created as a fashion accessory for a style-conscious young-at-heart woman, who regards her car to be as important as her entire outfit. It included a white, gold and black color scheme, full-length tinted glass panoramic roof, glossy black imitation leather, using 'quilted' stitching and trimmed to look like sofas, and black long-pile 'Pony-hide' carpet.

The Soul Burner was described as the 'bad boy' of Soul concepts. It included a solid roof panel and no roof rails, 245/40R19 tires, four bucket seats, and L-shaped day-light LED driving lamps around the outer edges. At the rear, two vertical exhaust pipes were placed at the extremes of the bumper.

Kia's Soul Searcher was designed to capture the spirit of Korean and Far Eastern culture, with a focus on achieving personal inner peace and creating a calm cocoon for the occupants. It included an old leather finish on the bonnet, powered folding roof, tailgate panel, dashboard, door panels and steering wheel rim, plus gray-beige felt floor and seats.

The Soul Hamstar Edition, introduced in 2011, featured body colored bumpers, rear sport spoiler, black 18-inch wheels, black fender vents w/side marker repeater, rear bumper applique, matte alloy fuel door, Hamstar exterior graphics, black leather seating, heated seats, hamstar edition floor mats, smart key push button starting, automatic climate control, fog lights, and leather steering wheel and shift knob.

The vehicles were unveiled at the 2008 Geneva Motor Show. The Soul Burner later appeared at the 2008 SEMA show.

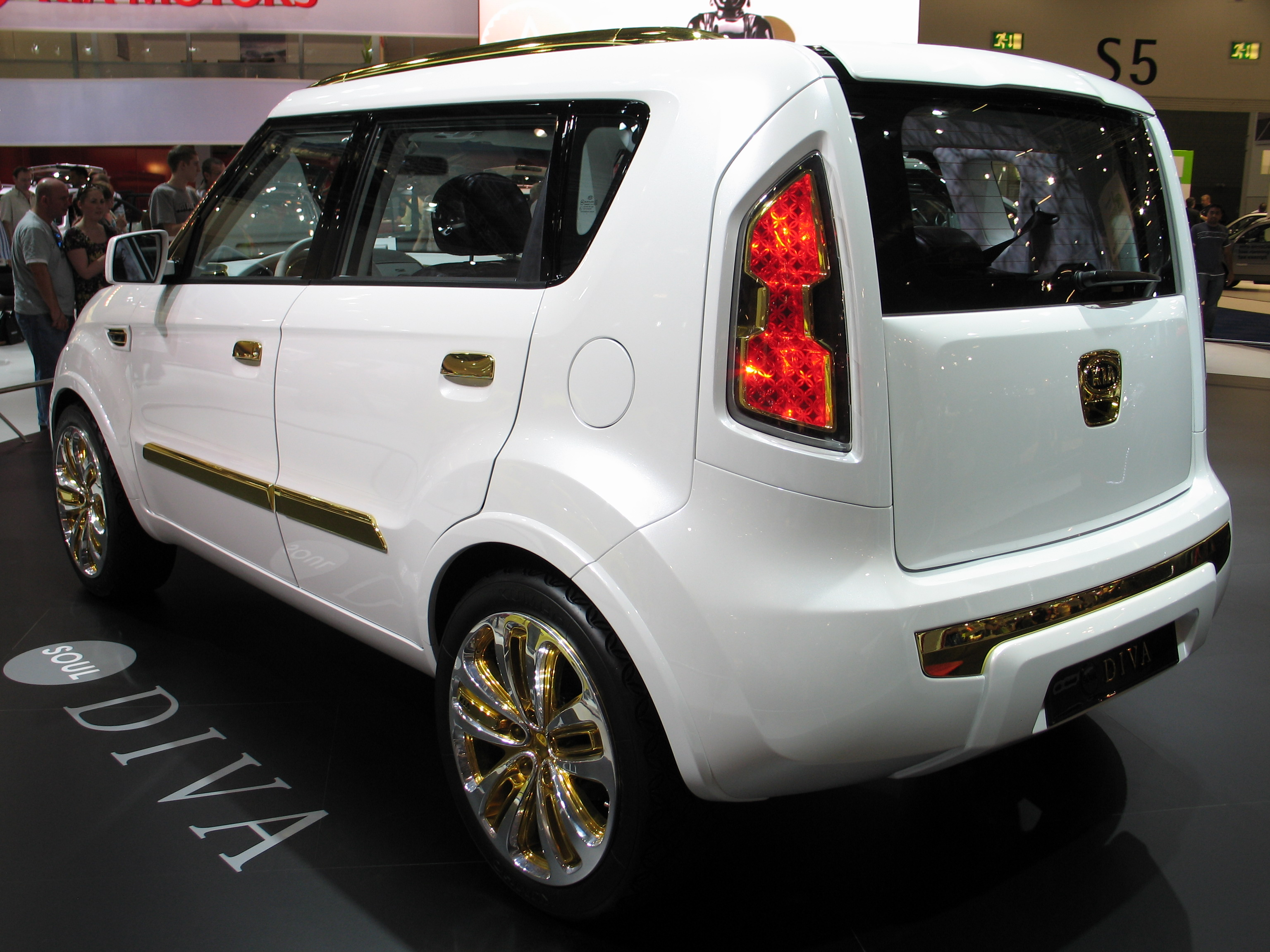
Kia Soul Diva concept

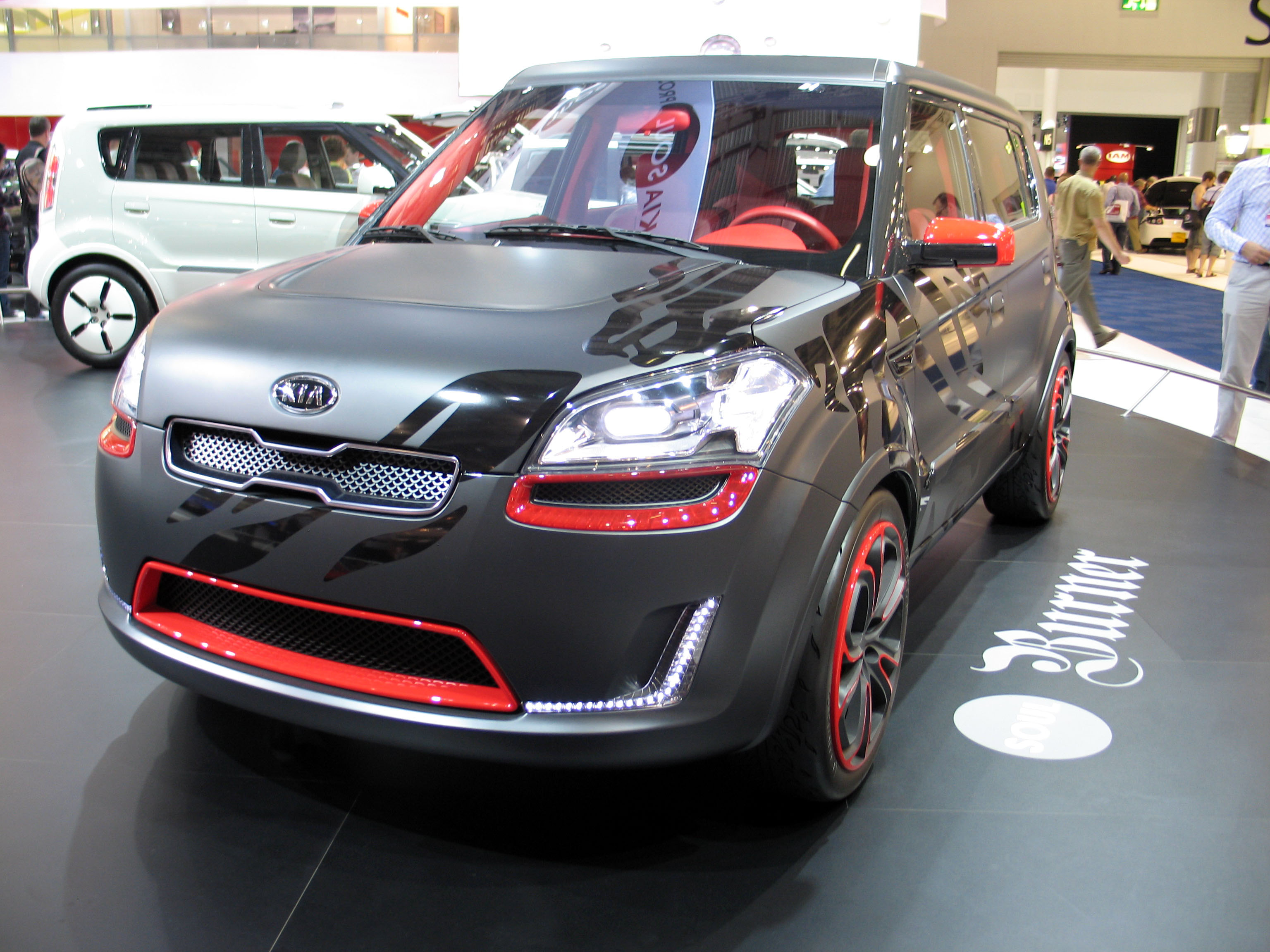
Kia Soul Burner concept

Soul Hybrid (2008)

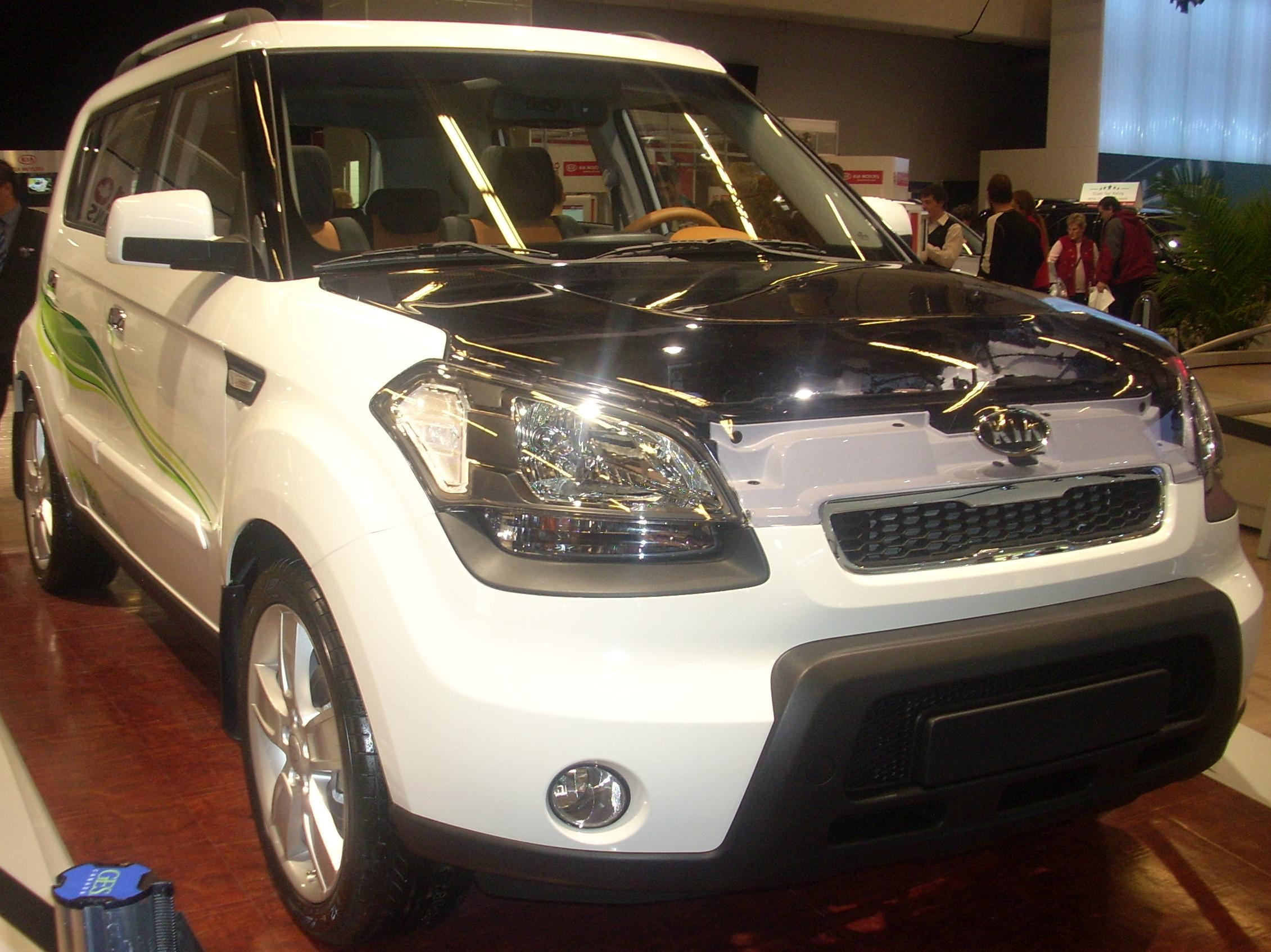
Kia Eco-Soul Concept

The Soul Hybrid/Eco-Soul is a concept vehicle with a Gamma 1.6L gasoline engine, an electric motor rated 15 kW (20 PS; 20 hp) and 105 N⋅m (77 lb⋅ft), continuously variable transmission, ISG (Idle Stop&Go), regenerative braking.

The vehicle was unveiled at the 2008 Paris Motor Show and later at Auto Shanghai and later at the Canadian International Auto Show.

Soul'ster Concept (2009)

Kia Soul'ster

The Soul'ster is a concept vehicle with a 2-door, 4-seater cabriolet SUV body styling with an open roof over the rear seats. It includes dual chrome exhaust, polished aluminum exhaust tips featuring carbon-fiber interior sleeves, and 19-inch 5-spoke aluminum alloy wheels. It is similar to the Jeep Wrangler. The vehicle was unveiled at the 2009 NAIAS.

=== Marketing ===
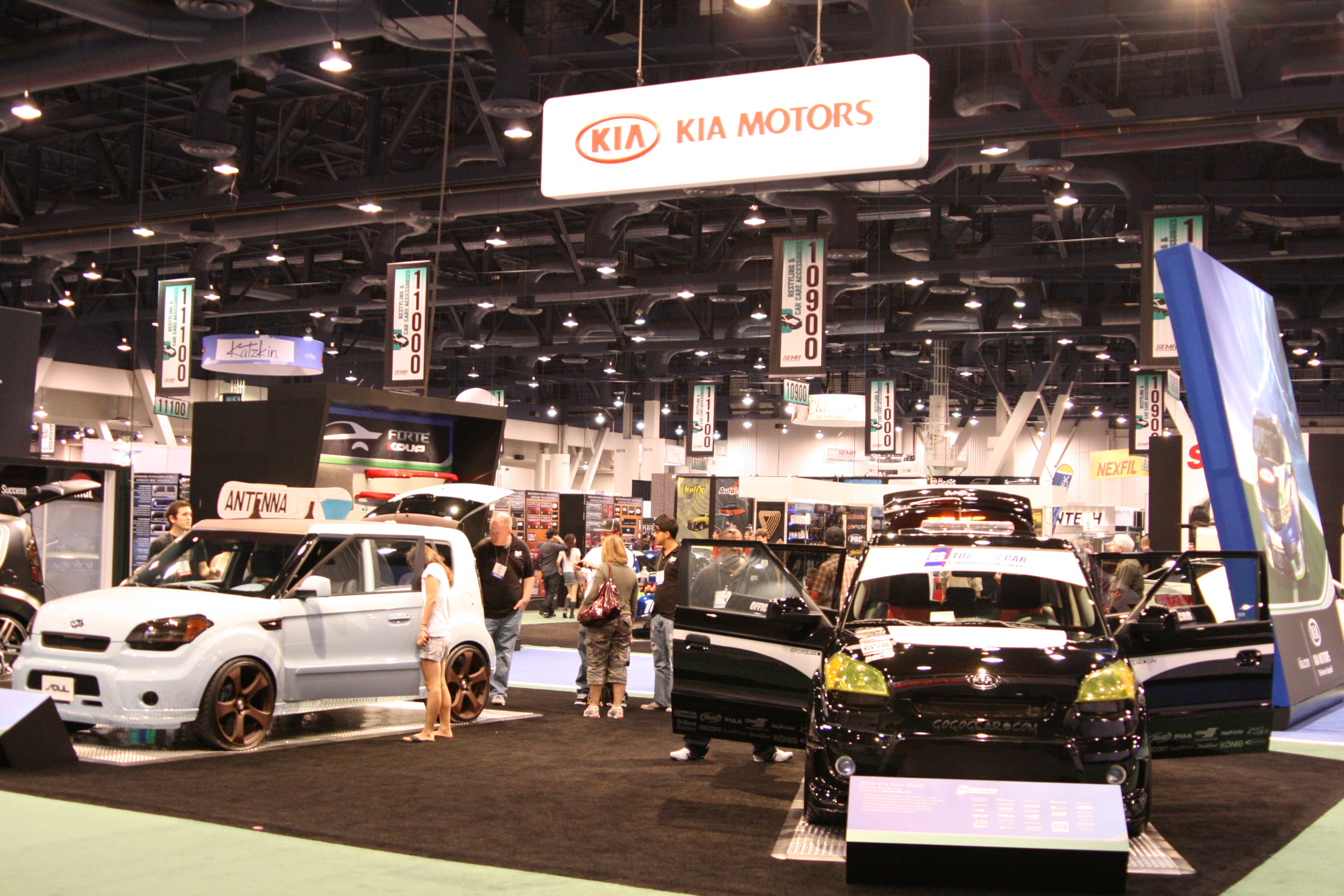
Kia Soul exhibit at the 2009 SEMA auto show in Las Vegas.

After the Soul's release, Kia USA launched commercials in a campaign titled "A new way to roll", created by Los Angeles-based ad agency David&Goliath, and featuring city streets with animated hamsters on stationary hamster wheels. The commercials have attracted popularity on video-sharing sites and were awarded "Automotive Ad of the Year" at the Nielsen Automotive Advertising Awards.

Featured songs include "Do What You Do" by Marz, "Fort Knox" by Goldfish, "Junkyard" by The Potbelleez, "colors" by Calvin Harris, "The Choice Is Yours (Revisited)" by Black Sheep, "Applause" by Lady Gaga and, during the 2011 MTV Video Music Awards, "Party Rock Anthem" by LMFAO.

A 2013 Soul commercial, released August 2012, featured the song "In My Mind (Axwell Remix)" by Ivan Gough, Feenixpawl and Georgi Kay with hamsters at an 18th-century opera house to the song.

In October 2011, the Kia Soul Hamsters were inducted into the Madison Avenue Walk of Fame, advertising industry's equivalent of Hollywood and Vine. As of 2011, Kia is also the only car manufacturer to be inducted. From 2010 to 2012, Kia released a series of commercials for the Soul featuring professional golfer Michelle Wie.

As an April Fool's Day joke, Kia published a press release on a new environmentally friendly concept based on the Soul in 2010, called the Air Propulsion and Retardation Installation Line. The concept used sensors on the bumpers and retractable panels to harness the flow of wind.

=== Reviews and awards ===
The Soul earned a Red Dot design award in 2009. In a Popular Mechanics comparison, the Soul surpassed the Nissan Cube and the Scion xB. Fifth Gear gave it a 4/5 rating, as did The Times and WhatCar?. The Soul was named to the Kelley Blue Book's '5 Great Deals' List, and recognized by the Texas Auto Writers Association as 'Best Value'.

The Soul was recognized on the "Coolest New Cars Under US $18,000" list by Kelley Blue Book's KBB.com in 2009, and featured on the "Top 10 Back-to-School Cars" list by Kelley Blue Book's KBB.com. The Soul was named "Best Car 2009" by the Chilean daily newspaper La Tercera, and Kia Motors Chile was also selected as "Best Maker of the Year 2009" in Chile. The Soul'ster concept was also awarded 2009 Concept Truck of the Year.

The Soul's residual value after three years was valued at 56 percent of the original value to take the top place in its segment in the Automotive Lease Guide's latest report. It surpassed the Nissan Cube and the Scion xB.

In 2010, the Soul was named by Time's as one of the "Most Exciting Cars of 2010". Also that year, the car was named one of "10 Great And Safe Rides For Teens" by Autoweek magazine, and was given the "2010 Automotive Excellence Award" By Popular Mechanics. In the same year, the Soul was also named "Small Car of the Year" by FAMA Magazine and 'Best Hatchback of 2010' by Cars.com. Edmunds.com named the Soul as one of the "Top Recommended" Vehicles for 2010.

== Second generation (PS; 2013) ==
Second generation
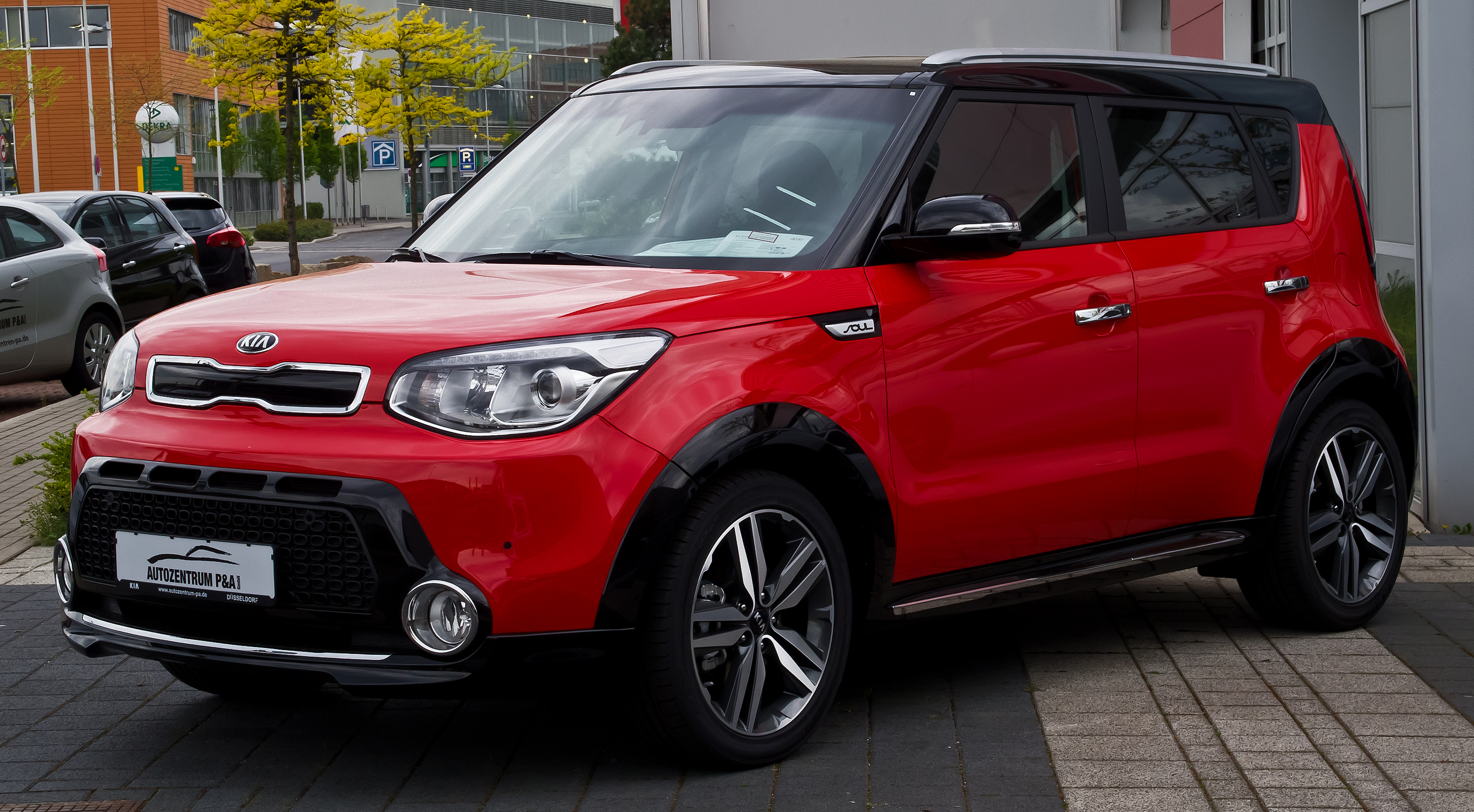
- Pre-facelift

Overview
- Model code: PS
- Production: 2013–2019
- Model years: 2014–2019
- Assembly: South Korea: Gwangju (Gwangju Plant); Russia: Kaliningrad (Avtotor)
- Designer: Byung-Kyu Park (2009)

Body and chassis
- Related: Kia cee'd (JD)

Powertrain
- Engine: Gasoline: 1.6 L Gamma II MPi I4; 1.6 L Gamma II GDi I4; 2.0 L Nu MPi I4; 2.0 L Nu GDi I4; Diesel: 1.6 L U II CRDi I4
- Transmission: 6-speed manual; 6-speed automatic; 7-speed DCT

Dimensions
- Wheelbase: 2,570 mm (101.2 in)
- Length: 4,140 mm (163.0 in)
- Width: 1,800 mm (70.9 in)
- Height: 1,600 mm (63.0 in)
- Curb weight: 1,264–1,426 kg (2,787–3,144 lb)

Unveiled at the 2013 New York and Frankfurt auto shows, the second generation Soul is based on Kia's Track'ster concept, and offers an increase in torsional rigidity of 28.7%, wheelbase increased to 2,570 mm (101.2 in), width increased to 1,800 mm (70.9 in) and the same overall height of 1,600 mm (63.0 in). The redesign features a wraparound greenhouse, high-mounted taillights, a large trapezoidal lower air intake, and a "floating" body color panel set into the liftgate.

The second-generation Kia Soul shares its platform with the second generation Kia cee'd hatchback. 66 percent of the chassis utilizes either Ultra High Strength Steel (35 percent) or High Strength Steel (31 percent). The front subframe uses four bushings (the first generation has none) and the shock absorbers on the rear torsion beam axle are now mounted vertically allowing for more suspension travel.

The U.S. model went on sale as a 2014 model year vehicle, and early models included a choice of 1.6-liter Gamma GDi or 2.0-liter Nu GDi engines, mated to 6-speed manual or 6-speed automatic transmissions. Trim levels included base, + (Plus), and ! (Exclaim) models.

The European model was set to go on sale in early 2014, with a UK launch in Spring 2014. Early models include a choice of 1.6-liter GDi gasoline or CRDi diesel engines (from the previous generation Kia Soul), six-speed manual or automatic transmission, three different roof colors (black, white, and red), and a choice of 11 body colors. Korean market models received the same two engines, with the 2.0-liter gasoline engine currently reserved for North American buyers.

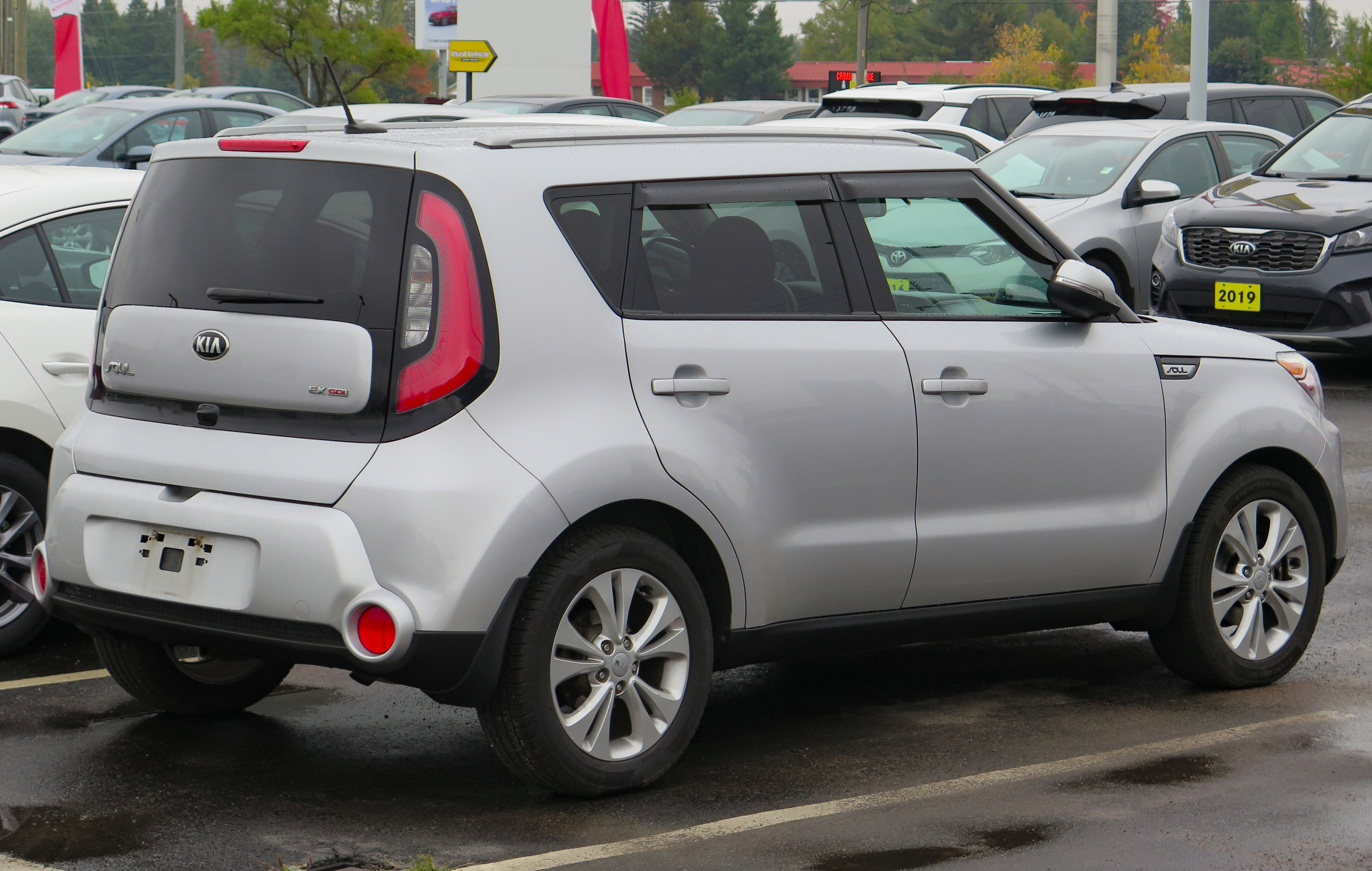
Rear (pre-facelift)

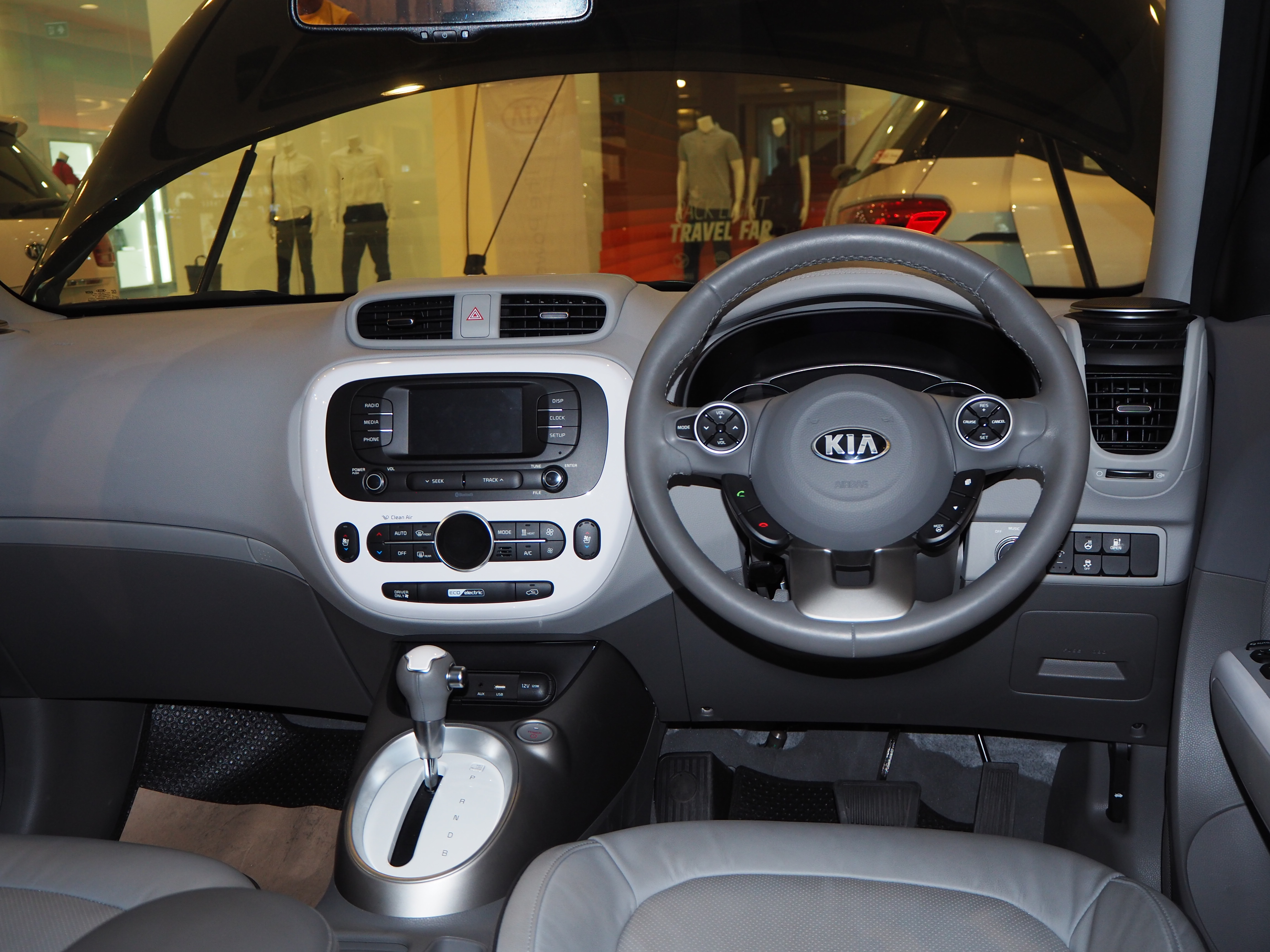
Interior (Soul EV)

=== Kia Track'ster concept (2012) ===
The Kia Track'ster concept is a 3-door concept subcompact crossover hatchback, which presaged the second-generation Soul. The vehicle was unveiled at the 2012 Chicago Auto Show.

The Kia Track'ster concept was equipped with a custom 19-inch wheels designed by Kia's California design team and HRE, 360 mm (14 in) Brembo vented and cross-drilled front disc brakes with six-piston calipers, 350 mm (13.6 in) rear brake discs with four-piston calipers, angled roof accented with Inferno Orange, lengthened front door with smooth billet push-style handles, carbon fiber lower side valances in Inferno Orange and incorporate functional rear-brake cooling ducts, back hatch incorporates a horizontal Inferno Orange "backpack" panel five inches wider than a production Soul, 2.0-liter turbocharged four-cylinder engine rated at 250 hp (186 kW; 253 PS), electronically controlled four-wheel-drive system, and a short-throw six-speed manual transmission.

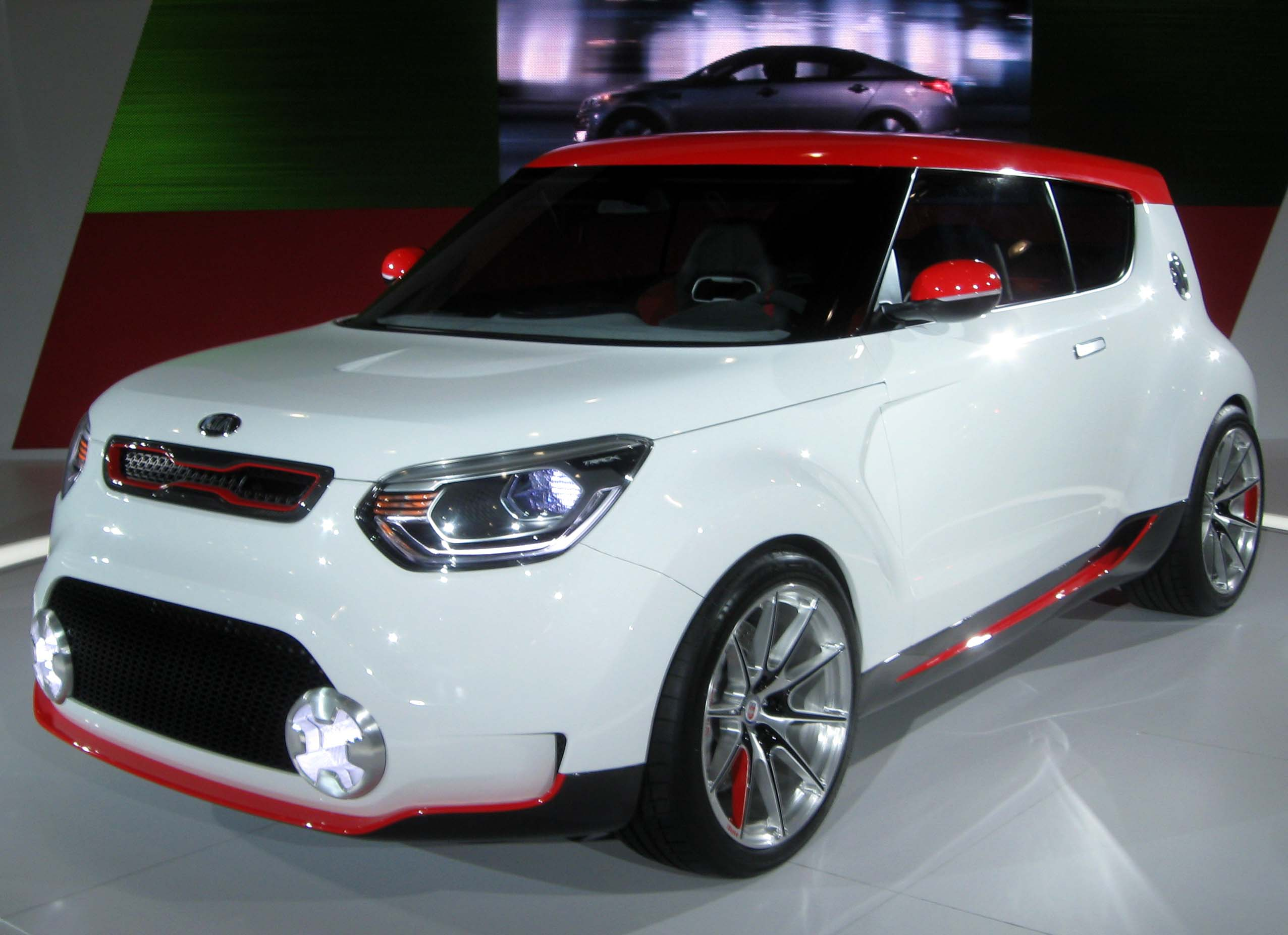
Track'ster concept

Facelift (2017)

For model year 2017, the Soul underwent a facelift. Included in the changes are some minor body trim changes, new paint colors, and new headlight options. The biggest change comes at the top trim level, in which the old 2.0-liter Nu engine is replaced by the 1.6-liter turbo gasoline engine, which adds 40 hp (30 kW) and 61 N⋅m (45 lb⋅ft) of torque over the outgoing model. The engine is mated to a 7-speed dual-clutch transmission, replacing the 6-speed automatic. The powertrain change resulted in the car being one of the fastest in its class.

In 2018, reports linked a large number of fires to the Soul in the United States. The Center for Auto Safety subsequently demanded Kia recall all Soul vehicles from 2010 through 2015 for fire hazard. Kia initiated a voluntary recall for fire risk on January 11, 2019, but the Soul was not included in the recall.

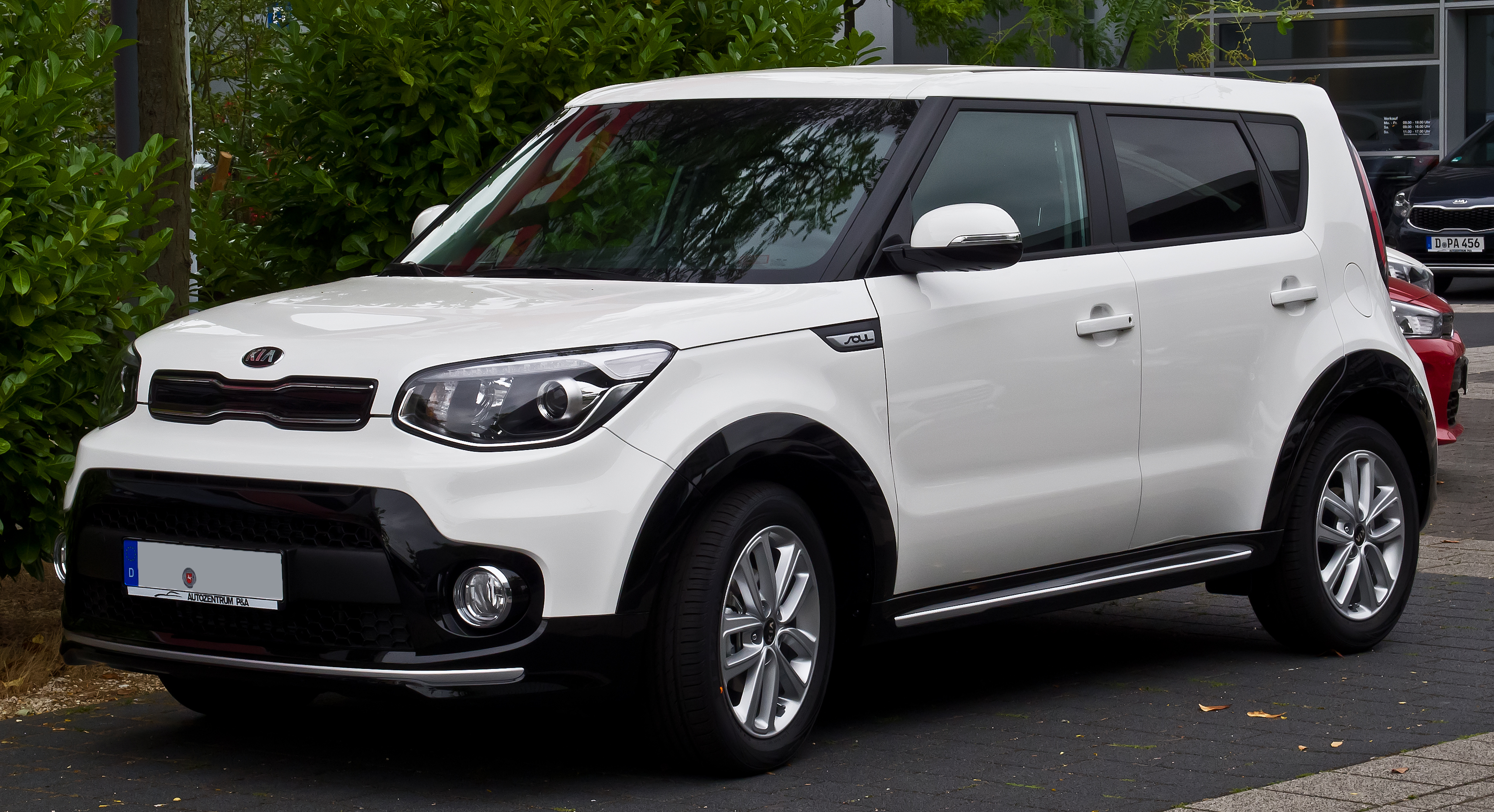
2017 facelift

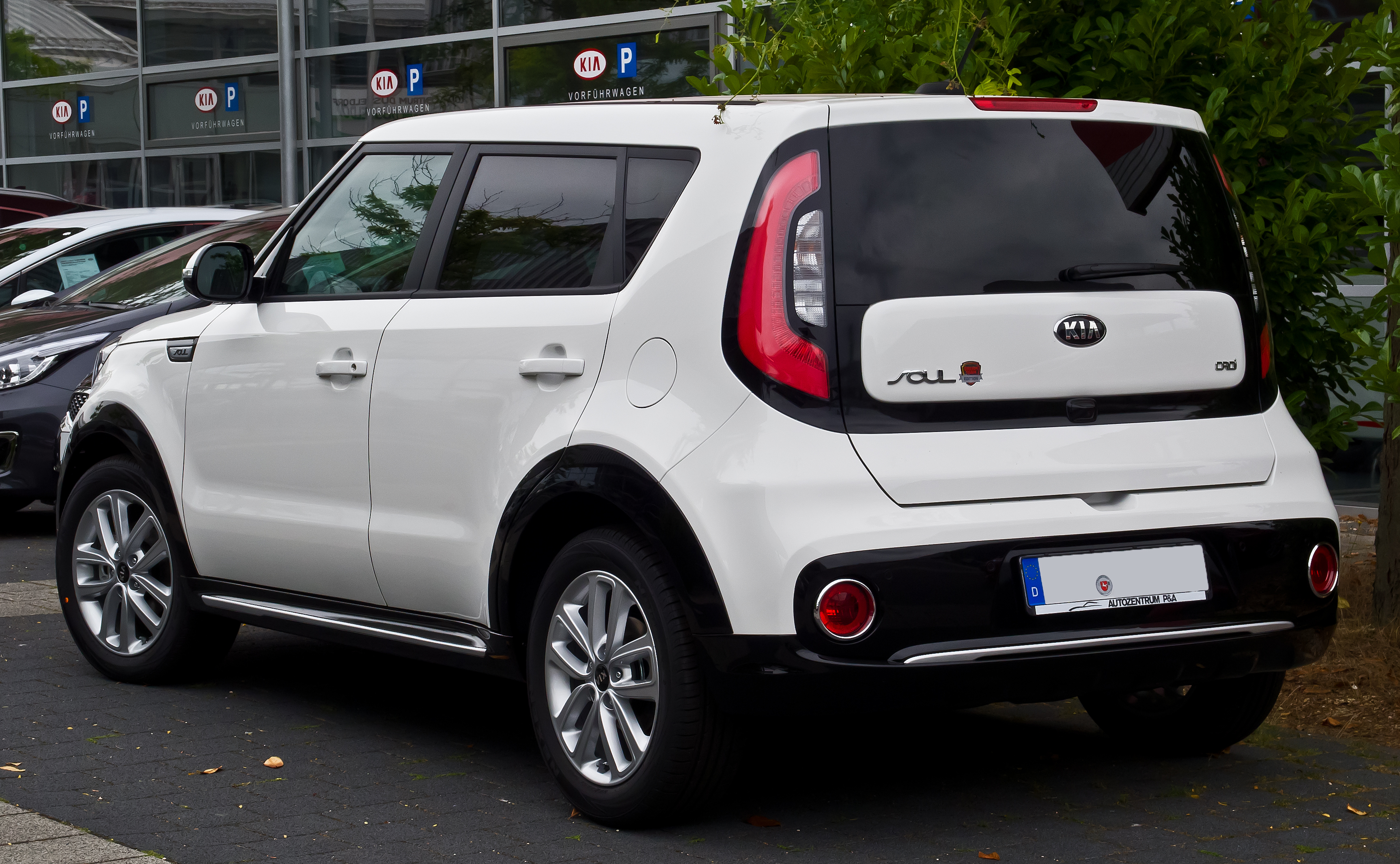
2017 facelift

=== Special editions ===
"Red Line" edition (2014–)

The Red Line edition is a limited (2,000 units) version of 2014 Soul Plus with white body color, body kit with red accents, redesigned grille, front and rear fascias, and side skirts; custom 18-inch alloy wheels, 2.0-liter gasoline direct injected (GDI) four-cylinder engine, six-speed automatic transmission, black cloth seats with red stitching, leather steering wheel, black-leather dash hood with red stitching, black carpeted floor mats with red piping, sport pedals; shift knob ring, air vent ring, dash speakers and console tray trim in red.

Kia Soul EV (2015)

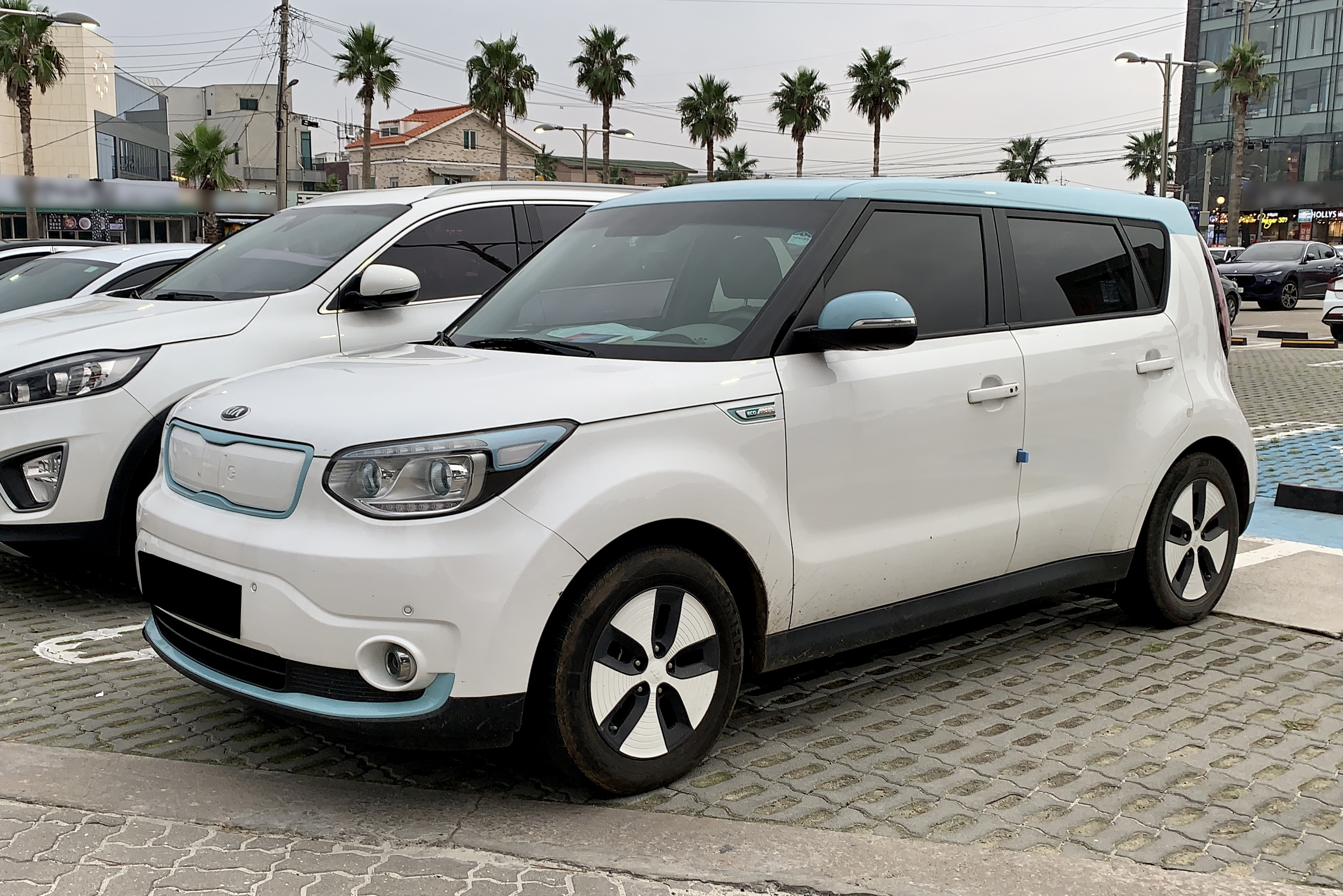
Kia Soul EV

In 2013, Kia started testing prototype versions of a Soul electric vehicle based on the second-generation Soul. In November 2013, Kia announced they would be producing the Soul EV and it would go on sale in 2014. Powered by a 27 kWh lithium-ion polymer battery pack, the Soul EV has a target range of over 190 km (120 mi) and fast charging capability of 100 kW DC via a CHAdeMO connection. Its motor is rated at 109 bhp (81 kW; 111 PS) and 285 N⋅m (210 lb⋅ft) of torque.

The vehicle was first showcased at the Chicago Auto Show in February 2014 where Kia announced the Soul EV will be offered in California, Oregon, New York, New Jersey, and Maryland. Kia is targeting regions with the largest EV markets and infrastructure.

Soul Autonomous Vehicle (2016)

Kia demonstrated their upcoming "Drive Wise" sub-brand at the 2016 Consumer Electronics Show with a Soul EV modified with Advanced Driver Assistance Systems (ADAS) technology.

=== Powertrain ===
Specs
Model	Years	Transmission	Power@rpm	Torque@rpm	0–100 km/h (0–62 mph) (Official)	Top Speed
Petrol
1.6 Gamma II MPi	2013–2019	6-speed manual 6-speed automatic	91 kW (124 PS; 122 hp) @ 6,300 rpm	156 N⋅m (115 lb⋅ft; 15.9 kg⋅m) @ 4,200 rpm		
1.6 Gamma II GDi	2013–2019	6-speed manual 6-speed automatic	97 kW (132 PS; 130 hp) @ 6,300 rpm	161 N⋅m (119 lb⋅ft; 16.4 kg⋅m) @ 4,850 rpm	11.0s (Manual)	185 km/h (115 mph) (Manual)
1.6 Gamma II T-GDi	2016–2019	7-speed dual clutch	150 kW (204 PS; 201 hp) @ 6,000 rpm	260 N⋅m (192 lb⋅ft; 26.5 kg⋅m) @ 1,500-4,500 rpm	7.8s	196 km/h (122 mph)
2.0 Nu MPi	2013–2019	6-speed manual 6-speed automatic	113 kW (153 PS; 151 hp) @ 6,000 rpm	186 N⋅m (137 lb⋅ft; 19 kg⋅m) @ 4,800 rpm		
2.0 Nu GDi	2013–2019	6-speed manual 6-speed automatic	122 kW (166 PS; 164 hp) @ 6,500 rpm	201 N⋅m (148 lb⋅ft; 20.5 kg⋅m) @ 4,800 rpm		
Diesel
1.6 U II CRDi	2013–2014	6-speed manual 6-speed automatic	94 kW (128 PS; 126 hp) @ 4,000 rpm	260 N⋅m (192 lb⋅ft; 26.5 kg⋅m) @ 1,900–2,750 rpm	11.2s (Manual); 12.2s (Automatic)	180 km/h (112 mph) (Manual); 177 km/h (110 mph) (Automatic)
1.6 U II CRDi	2014–2019	6-speed manual 7-speed dual clutch	100 kW (136 PS; 134 hp) @ 4,000 rpm	300 N⋅m (221 lb⋅ft; 30.6 kg⋅m) @ 1,750–2,500 rpm	11.2s (Manual); 11.1s (DCT)	180 km/h (112 mph) (Manual); 182 km/h (113 mph) (DCT)

=== Safety ===
IIHS scores
Moderate overlap frontal offset	Good
Small overlap frontal offset: Driver side – 2015–2019	Good
Small overlap frontal offset: Driver side – 2015–2019	Acceptable
Side impact	Good
Roof strength	Good

Euro NCAP test results for a LHD, 5-door hatchback variant on a 2014 registration:

Euro NCAP test results* Kia Soul (2014)
Test	Points	%
Overall:	4 /5 stars	
Adult occupant:	28.6	75%
Child occupant:	40.7	82%
Pedestrian:	21.3	59%
Safety assist:	7.3	56%

=== Marketing ===
Kia Motors once again teamed up with David&Goliath to promote the Soul using anthropomorphic hamster characters. The most recent commercial was for the Turbo model, featuring the Motörhead song "Ace of Spades".

=== Awards ===
The Soul won the 2014 Red Dot Award for Passenger Car Design and the iF Design Award for Discipline: Product in 2014 and Discipline: Communication in 2016.

== Third generation (SK3; 2019) ==
Third generation
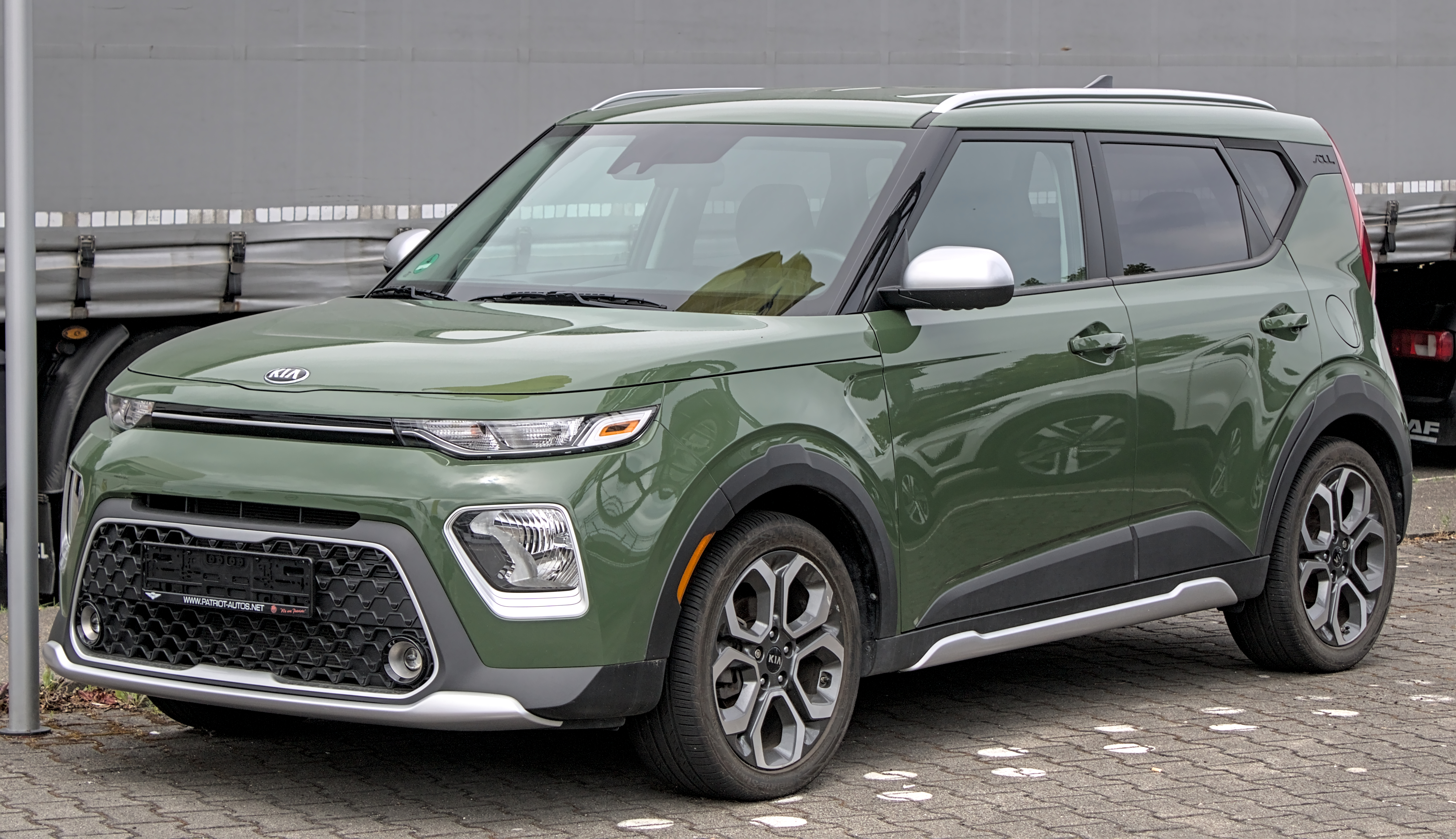

Overview
- Model code: SK3
- Production: 2019–2025
- Model years: 2020–2025
- Assembly: South Korea: Gwangju (Gwangju Plant)

Body and chassis
- Related: Kia Seltos (SP2); Hyundai Kona (OS)

Powertrain
- Engine: Gasoline: 1.6 L Gamma II MPi I4; 1.6 L Gamma II T-GDi I4; 2.0 L Nu MPi I4
- Transmission: 6-speed manual; 6-speed automatic; 7-speed DCT; CVT

Dimensions
- Wheelbase: 2,600 mm (102.4 in)
- Length: 4,195 mm (165.2 in)
- Width: 1,800 mm (70.9 in)
- Height: 1,600 mm (63.0 in)
- Curb weight: 1,270–1,375 kg (2,800–3,031 lb)

Kia unveiled the third-generation Soul and second-generation Soul EV (e-Soul in some markets) at the 2018 LA Auto Show. Unlike earlier models, it has thin lights as headlights, with the large grille remaining. An X-Line trim became optional.

Initial models in the US include two engine options, a turbocharged 1.6-liter engine or a naturally aspirated 2.0-liter engine. It will be both a gasoline model and an electric vehicle, with a strengthened chassis for crash safety. The Soul now shares a platform with the Hyundai Kona.

The third-generation Soul and Soul EV were slated for release in North America in the second quarter of 2019. In the US, Kia postponed the launch of the second-generation Soul EV to 2021.

The Soul EV is the only version of the third-generation model sold in Europe. It is now called e-Soul in most European markets, except for the UK. In South Korea, this generation was distinguished with the name "Soul Booster," and was available either as an EV or with a gasoline engine. The third generation Soul shares a 64-kWh battery pack and powertrain with the Niro.

In 2021, Kia discontinued the Soul in South Korea, due to poor sales and competition from the similarly sized Seltos. In the same year, the Soul featured the new Kia logo.

The 6-speed manual was discontinued in the United States for the 2022 model year. Previously, it was only offered on the base LX model.

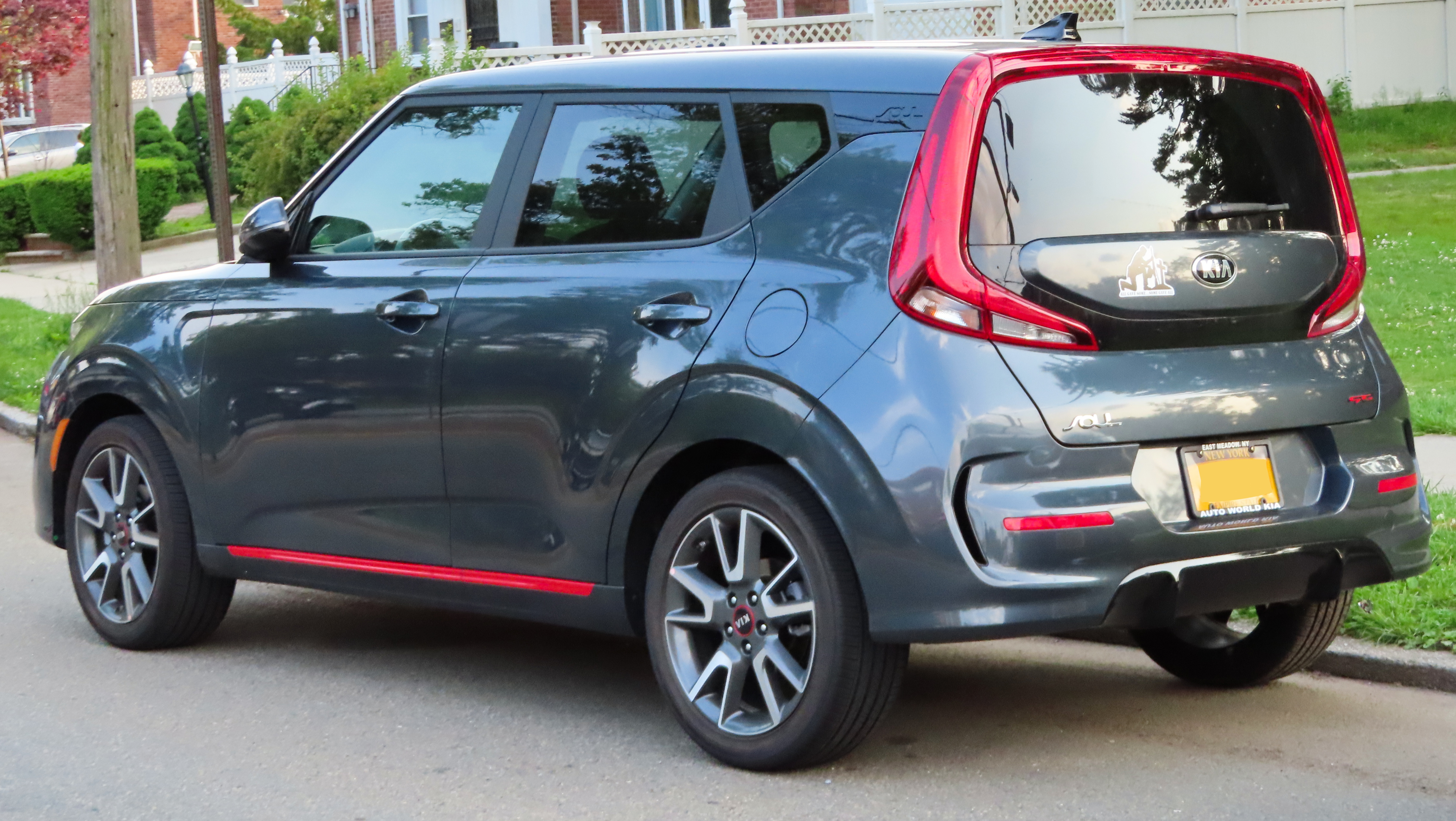
Rear (GT-Line)

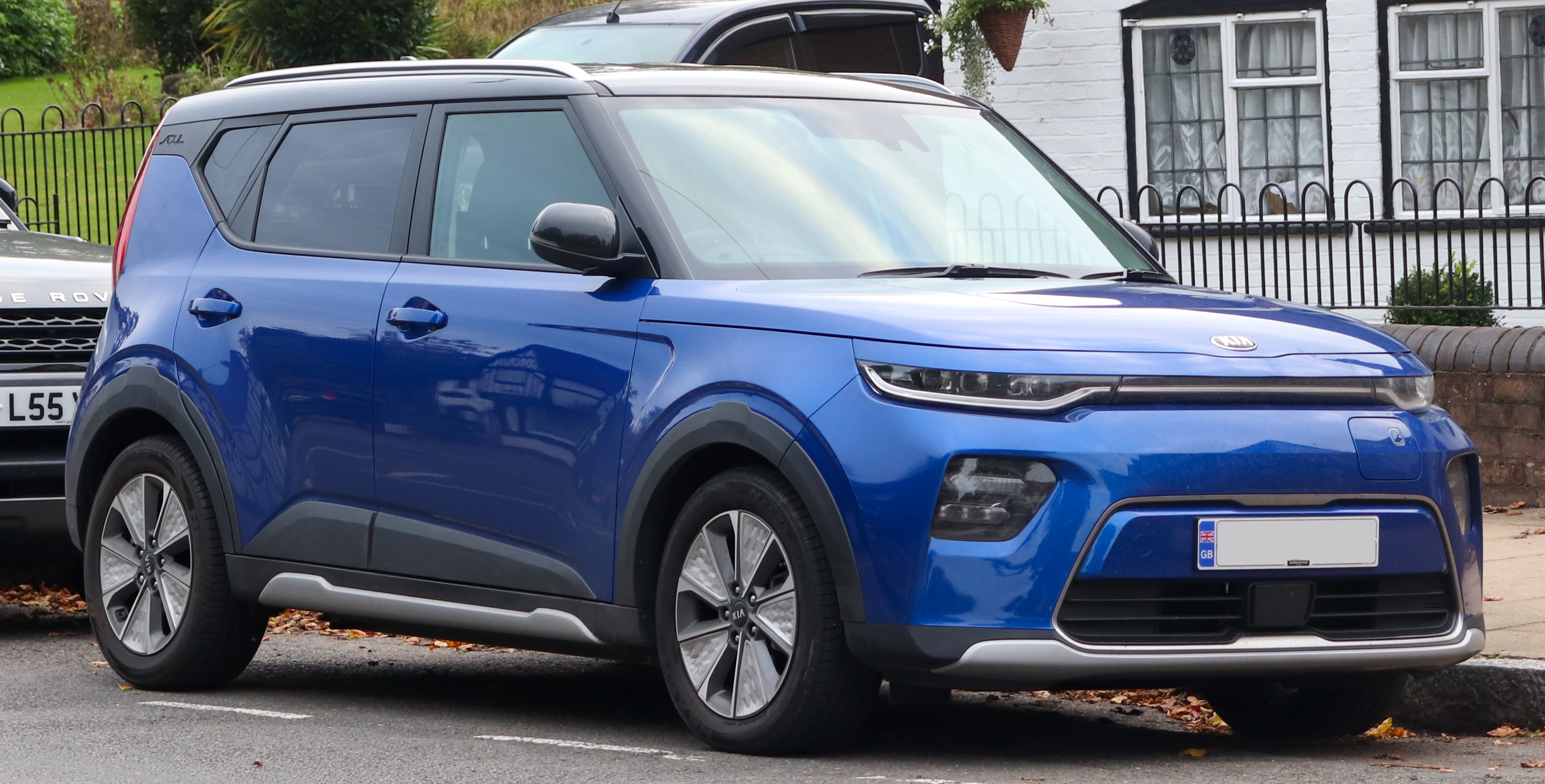
Soul EV

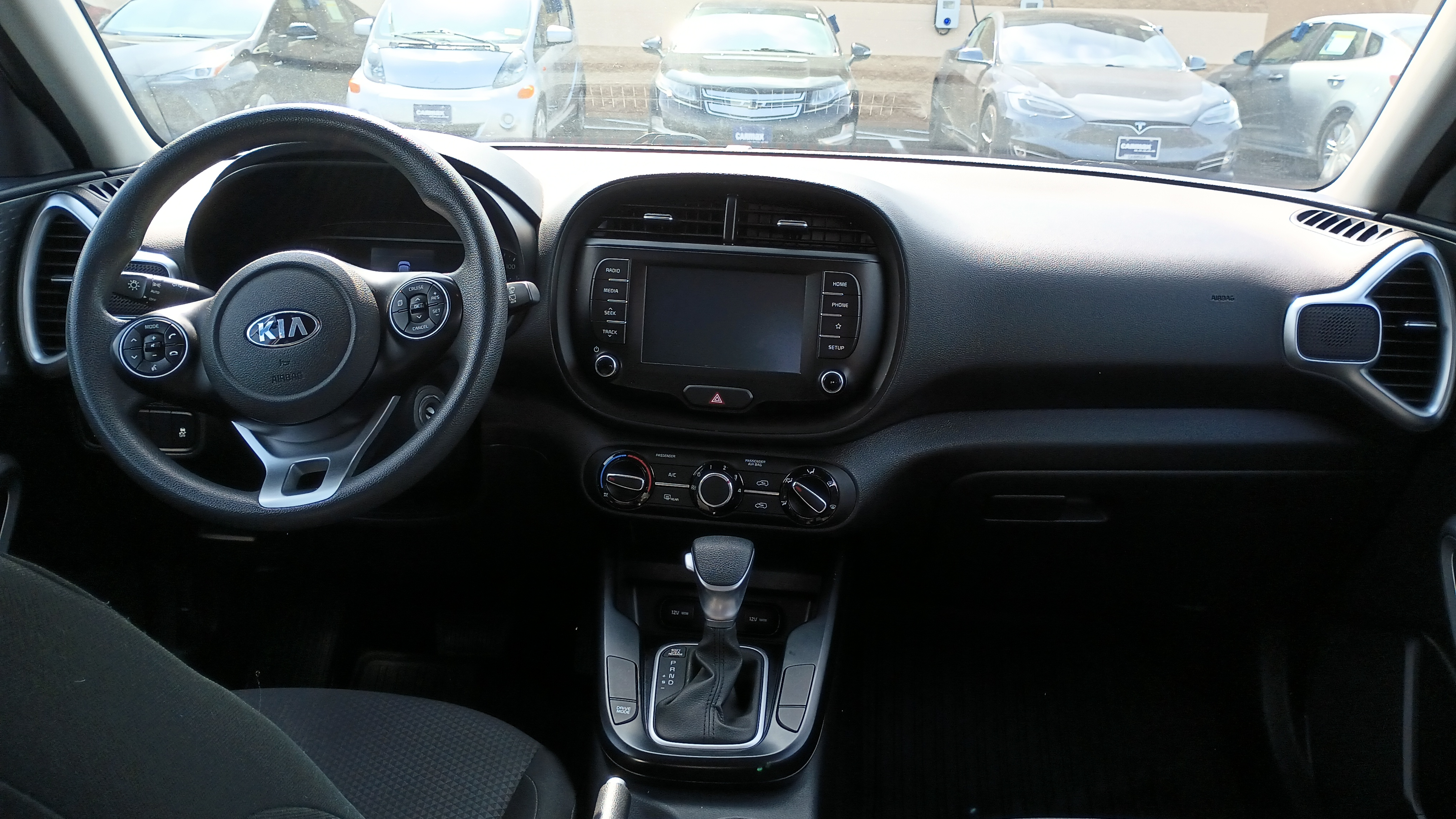
Interior

=== Facelift (2023) ===
For the 2023 model year, Kia updated the Soul, giving it revised headlights, taillights, front bumper, and rear fascia, along with new two-tone color combinations and new wheel designs. Along with the facelift, Kia discontinued the rugged-looking X-Line trim. Additionally, the turbo version was discontinued in the US, making the 2.0-liter Nu MPi naturally aspirated engine with CVT transmission the only available powertrain.

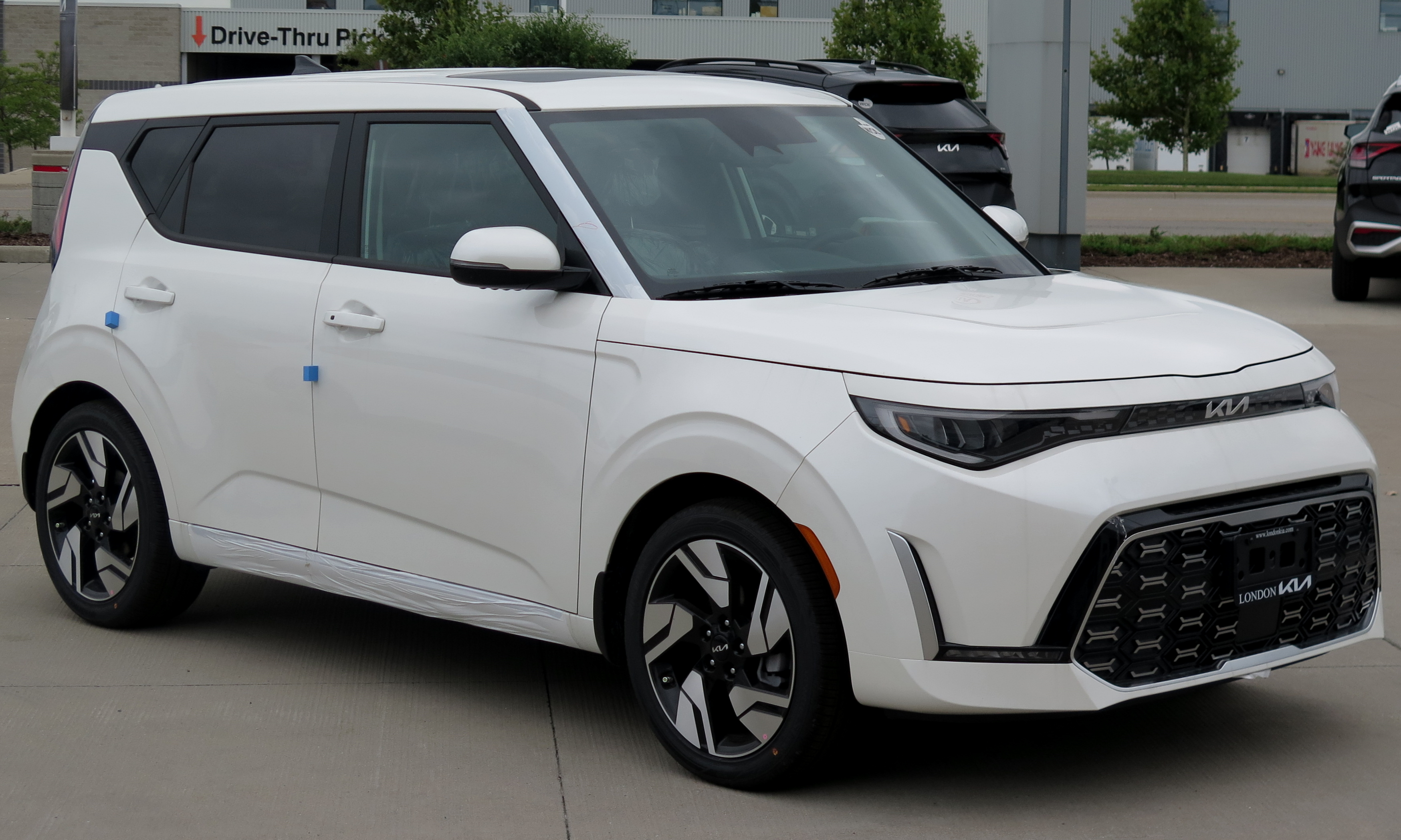
2023 Soul GT-Line (facelift)

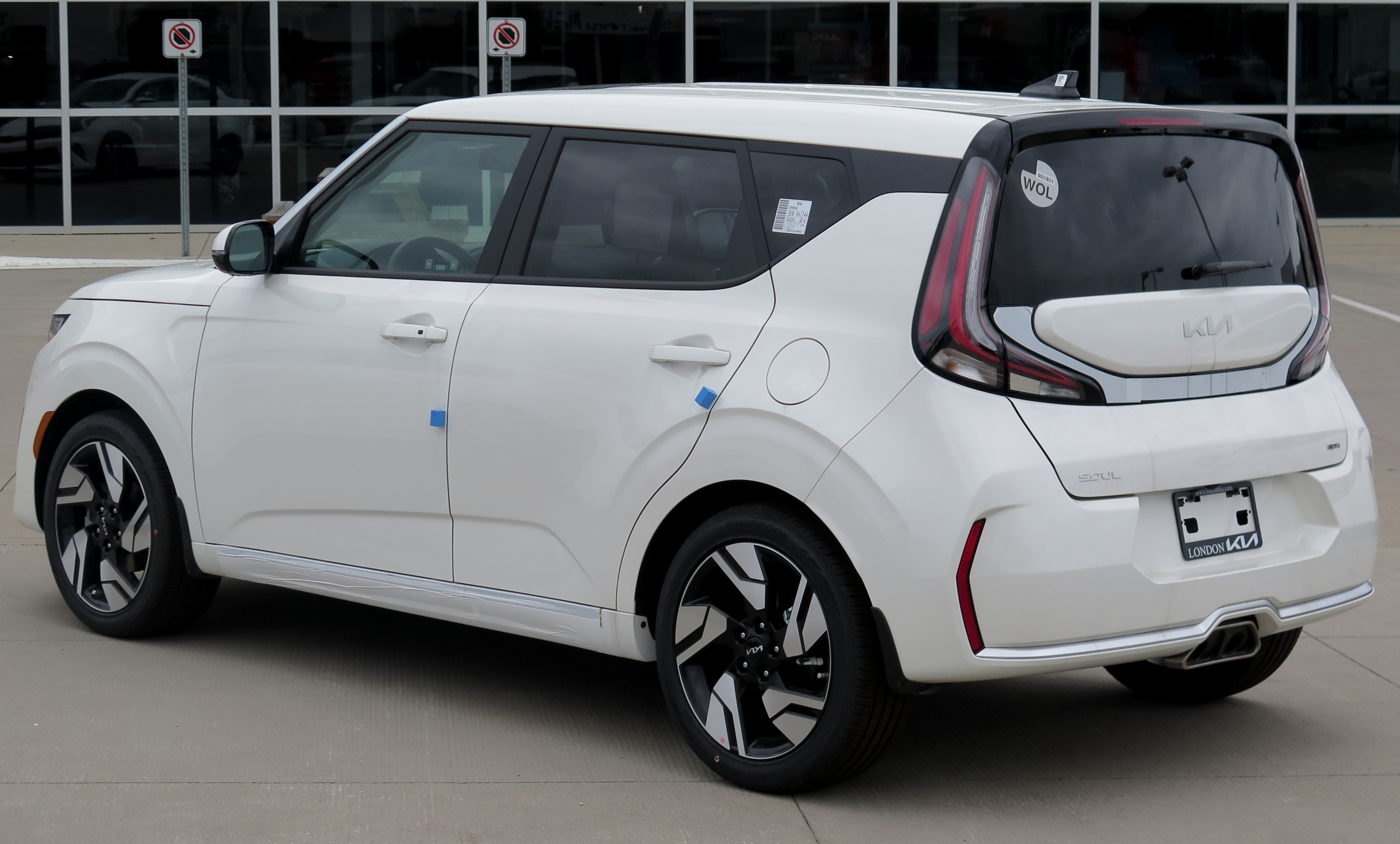
Rear view

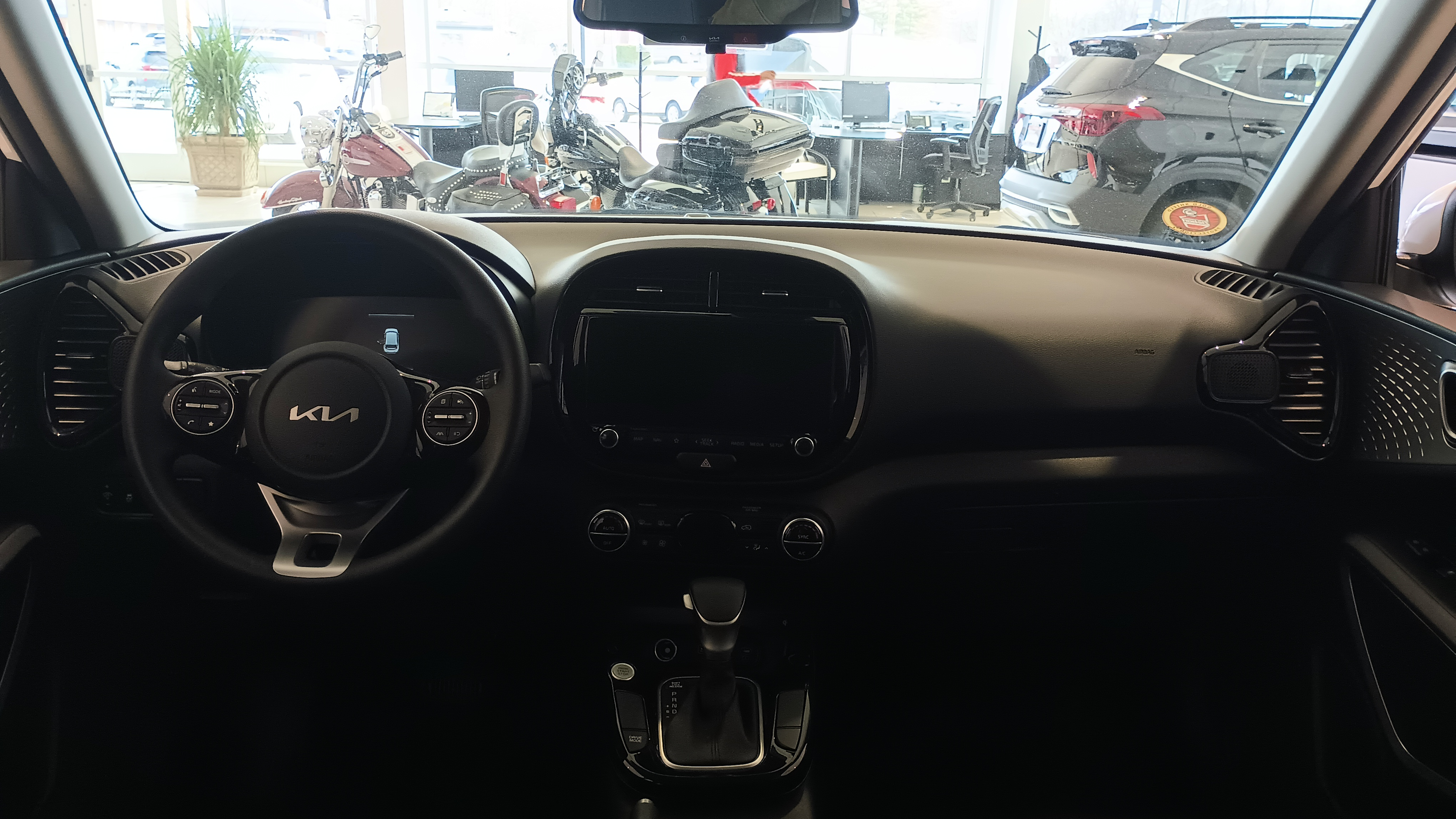
Interior

In Canada, Kia planned on discontinuing the electric model in late 2023 to focus their efforts on the Niro EV. In Europe, the last market for the Soul EV, sales were phased out in mid-2024 in favour of the EV3 that replaces it for global markets. Sales of small numbers of the Soul EV continued from existing stocks until 2025.

=== Engines ===
Model	Years	Type/code	Transmission	Power	Torque	Acceleration 0–100 km/h (0–62 mph) (official)
Petrol
1.6 Gamma II MPi	2019–2025	1,591 cc (97.1 cu in) I4	6-speed manual	90 kW (122 PS; 120 hp) @ 6,300 rpm	150 N⋅m (111 lb⋅ft; 15.3 kg⋅m) @ 4,850 rpm	11.2s
1.6 Gamma II MPi	2019–2025	1,591 cc (97.1 cu in) I4	6-speed automatic	90 kW (122 PS; 120 hp) @ 6,300 rpm	150 N⋅m (111 lb⋅ft; 15.3 kg⋅m) @ 4,850 rpm	12.0s
1.6 Gamma II T-GDi	2019–2025	1,591 cc (97.1 cu in) Turbo I4	7-speed DCT	150 kW (204 PS; 201 hp) @ 6,000 rpm	265 N⋅m (195 lb⋅ft; 27 kg⋅m) @ 1,500–4,500 rpm	7.8s
2.0 Nu MPi	2019–2025	1,999 cc (122.0 cu in) I4	6-speed manual	110 kW (150 PS; 148 hp) @ 6,200 rpm	180 N⋅m (133 lb⋅ft; 18.4 kg⋅m) @ 4,500 rpm	
2.0 Nu MPi	2019–2025	1,999 cc (122.0 cu in) I4	6-speed automatic	110 kW (150 PS; 148 hp) @ 6,200 rpm	180 N⋅m (133 lb⋅ft; 18.4 kg⋅m) @ 4,500 rpm	10.2s
2.0 Nu MPi	2019–2025	1,999 cc (122.0 cu in) I4	CVT	110 kW (150 PS; 148 hp) @ 6,200 rpm	180 N⋅m (133 lb⋅ft; 18.4 kg⋅m) @ 4,500 rpm	
Electric
Electric	2019–2024	e-Soul	1-speed direct drive	150 kW (204 PS; 201 hp) @ 3,800–8,000 rpm	395 N⋅m (291 lb⋅ft; 40.3 kg⋅m) @ 0–3,600 rpm	

=== Marketing ===
Kia Motors collaborated with K-pop singer Hyolyn to promote the Soul. In addition, Kia collaborated with the group Itzy to introduce the Soul Booster cars in the music video of the group debut single "Dalla Dalla". In collaboration with JYP Entertainment, Kia Motors' strategy was to create a growth story through various collaboration activities with the K-pop group, which included a Soul Booster Day with ITZY customer event, to spread the K-pop culture.

=== Safety ===
IIHS scores
Moderate overlap frontal offset	Good
Small overlap frontal offset: Driver side	Good
Small overlap frontal offset: Driver side	Good
Side impact	Good
Roof strength	Good

=== Reviews ===
U.S. News & World Report ranked the Kia Soul at No. 1 (tied with the Mazda CX-30 and Hyundai Kona) on its list of Best Subcompact SUVs for 2022, giving it a score of 8.4 out of 10.

== Discontinuation ==
On 6 October 2025, Kia announced the demise of the Soul, and production in Korea later ended that month of the same year.

It marked the end of an era for Kia’s long-running boxy subcompact crossover hatchback after 17 years of production since 2008, as they focus on larger crossovers and SUVs, including the Seltos, which serves as Kia’s entry-level crossover but at a higher price, for global markets.

== Sales ==
Since 2015, Kia has produced over a million units of the Soul. In the United States, over 100,000 units have been sold each year from 2011 to 2018, becoming the best-selling subcompact car ahead of the Nissan Versa.

Calendar year	United States	Canada	Mexico	Argentina	Europe (Note: Sales figures includes EU countries, Iceland, Liechtenstein, Norway and Switzerland.)	South Korea	Global
2009	31,621	8,489			20,169	21,239	
2010	67,110	9,857		269	15,286	22,200	
2011	102,267	11,651		369	11,489	16,792	
2012	115,778	7,560		208	5,532	6,661	
2013	118,079	7,618		164	3,202	1,345	
2014	145,316	9,944		253	10,261	4,373	
2015	147,133	13,335		488	16,326	3,925	203,518
2016	145,768	12,672	4,715	319	13,599	2,359	195,802
2017	115,712	11,691	8,161	170	12,437	3,009	
2018	104,709	11,029	9,132	123	11,214	2,406	
2019	98,033	11,868	10,226	66	5,122	5,564	
2020	71,862	8,144	5,236		8,038	1,264	
2021	75,126	7,344	4,560		8,144	165	
2022	57,820 (Note: incl. 1 Soul EV)	4,906 (Note: 4,215 Soul, 691 Soul EV)	4,030		4,822 (Note: All Soul EV)	–	80,262
2023	61,263	3,645 (Note: 2,975 Soul, 670 Soul EV)	2,619		1,887	–	73,914
2024	52,397	1,919	1,132		1,056	–	61,935
2025	50,133	704	28		53	–	54,320
