= The Girls (Calvin Harris song) =

2007 single by Calvin Harris

Single by Calvin Harris

from the album I Created Disco
- B-side: "Rock N Roll Attitude"
- Released: 4 June 2007
- Genre: Electro house
- Length: 5:15 (album version); 3:52 (radio edit)
- Label: Fly Eye; Columbia; Sony BMG
- Songwriter: Calvin Harris
- Producer: Calvin Harris

Calvin Harris singles chronology
"Acceptable in the 80s" (2007)	"The Girls" (2007)	"Merrymaking at My Place" (2007)

Music video
- "The Girls" on YouTube

"The Girls" is a song by Scottish musician Calvin Harris. It was released as the second single from his debut studio album, I Created Disco (2007), on 4 June 2007. "The Girls" was Harris' highest charting single on the UK Singles Chart, reaching number three on 10 June 2007. The demo version leaked on file sharing in April 2006 before I Created Disco was released after being featured on Pete Tong's Essential Selection. The song has been covered by electropop outfit Dragonette, who changed the main lyric to "The Boys".

== Music video ==
The video features a group of women in brightly coloured wigs and underwear performing a dance routine around Harris.

== Track listings ==
UK 12-inch single
No.	Title	Length
1.	"The Girls" (album version)	5:15
2.	"Rock N Roll Attitude"	3:19
3.	"The Girls" (Micky Slim's Bomb Squad mix)	7:09

UK 12-inch single (Groove Armada remixes)
No.	Title	Length
1.	"The Girls" (Groove Armada remix)	8:04
2.	"The Girls" (Groove Armada dub)	7:47

Australian maxi-CD single
No.	Title	Length
1.	"The Girls" (radio edit)	3:52
2.	"Rock N Roll Attitude"	3:19
3.	"The Girls" (Groove Armada remix)	8:04
4.	"The Girls" (Micky Slim's Bomb Squad mix)	7:09

Digital download EP
No.	Title	Length
1.	"The Girls"	5:18
2.	"The Girls" (Groove Armada remix)	8:05
3.	"The Girls" (Micky Slim's Bomb Squad mix)	7:11
4.	"The Girls" (Groove Armada dub)	7:48

== Charts ==
=== Weekly charts ===
Chart (2007)	Peak position
Australia (ARIA)	33
Europe (Eurochart Hot 100)	11
Ireland (IRMA)	23
Scottish Singles Sales (Official Charts)	4
UK Singles (Official Charts)	3
UK Dance (Official Charts)	1

=== Year-end charts ===
Chart (2007)	Position
UK Singles (OCC)	84

== Certifications ==
Region	Certification	Certified units/sales
Australia (ARIA)	Gold	35,000^{‡}
United Kingdom (BPI)	Silver	200,000^{‡}
^{‡} Sales+streaming figures based on certification alone.

== Release history ==
Region	Date	Format(s)	Label(s)	Ref.
United Kingdom	4 June 2007	—N/a	Fly Eye; Columbia; Sony BMG	
Australia	6 August 2007	CD	Fly Eye; Columbia; Red Label; Sony BMG	

== In popular culture ==
"The Girls" has often been associated with the fictional characters Ronnie and Roxy Mitchell from the BBC soap opera EastEnders. When they were introduced in 2007, a trailer announcing their arrival featured the song which showed Roxy dancing wildly and Ronnie spraying the residents with a soda syphon as some cheer them on whilst others look dismayed with the tagline "The Square – Under New Management". The song featured in a 2013 episode of show which showed Roxy dancing to the song whilst drunk before falling off a table. "The Girls" was finally featured in the pair's final episode in 2017 at Ronnie's wedding where the arrival trailer is recreated as Ronnie and Roxy both spray the wedding attendees with soda syphons.
