= Acceptable in the 80s =

2007 single by Calvin Harris

Single by Calvin Harris

from the album I Created Disco
- B-side: "This Is the Industry"; "Love for You"
- Released: 12 March 2007
- Genre: Electro-funk; synth-pop; Eurodisco
- Length: 5:34 (album version); 3:35 (single version); 7:35 (demo version)
- Label: Fly Eye; Columbia
- Songwriter: Calvin Harris
- Producer: Calvin Harris

Calvin Harris singles chronology
"Vegas" (2007)	"Acceptable in the 80s" (2007)	"The Girls" (2007)

Music video
- "Acceptable in the 80s" on YouTube

"Acceptable in the 80s" is a song by Scottish musician Calvin Harris, taken from his debut studio album I Created Disco. It was released as his debut single on 12 March 2007. The single peaked at number 10 on the UK Singles Chart.

== Music video ==
The music video, directed by Woof Wan-Bau, features many references to the 1980s, including the stereotypical large hairstyles and bright DayGlo colours. It also features scientists dissecting a sock puppet of what appears to be a genet, the products of which are used by a hair stylist and a TV chef, and to heal a grazed knee.

== Covers and samples ==
A remix of the song with additional lyrics (retitled "Love for You"), was included as a B-side to the single.

Duran Duran partially covered the song during their 2021–2023 live dates, mixing the song's chorus with the group's own 1981 single "Girls on Film".

In 2022, English comedy hip-hop group the Northern Boys sampled the song for their single "Nobody Likes Me". Acts such as The Airport District, Pittsburgh Slim and Out of the Blue have also sampled the song.

== Track listings ==
10-inch (FLYEYE 001)
No.	Title	Length
1.	"Acceptable in the 80s"	5:33
2.	"This Is the Industry"	3:36

12-inch (FLYEYE 003)
No.	Title	Length
1.	"Acceptable in the 80s" (Tom Neville Remix)	7:16
2.	"Acceptable in the 80s"	5:33
3.	"Acceptable in the 80s" (Glimmers Remix)	5:58

Maxi CD (FLYEYE 004)
No.	Title	Length
1.	"Acceptable in the 80s" (Radio Edit)	3:31
2.	"Love for You"	3:49
3.	"Acceptable in the 80s"	5:33
4.	"Acceptable in the 80s" (Tom Neville Remix)	7:16

== Charts ==
=== Weekly charts ===
Chart (2007–2008)	Peak position
Australia (ARIA)	97
Australian Dance (ARIA)	16
CIS Airplay (TopHit)	51
Denmark (Tracklisten)	14
Germany (GfK)	30
Ireland (IRMA)	30
Scottish Singles Sales (Official Charts)	9
UK Singles (Official Charts)	10
UK Dance (Official Charts)	2

=== Year-end charts ===
Chart (2007)	Position
UK Singles (OCC)	65

== Certifications ==
Region	Certification	Certified units/sales
Australia (ARIA)	2× Platinum	140,000^{‡}
United Kingdom (BPI)	Platinum	600,000^{‡}
^{‡} Sales+streaming figures based on certification alone.
