= Merrymaking at My Place =

Single by Calvin Harris

from the album I Created Disco
- B-side: "Wild Scenes"
- Released: 20 August 2007
- Recorded: 2007
- Length: 4:09
- Label: Columbia; Sony
- Songwriter: Calvin Harris
- Producer: Calvin Harris

Calvin Harris singles chronology
"The Girls" (2007)	"Merrymaking at My Place" (2007)	"Colours" (2007)

Music video
- "Merrymaking at My Place" on YouTube

"Merrymaking at My Place" is a song by Scottish musician Calvin Harris. It was released as the third single from Harris' debut studio album, I Created Disco (2007), on 20 August 2007. The radio edit which appears on the single has an altered chorus and several altered verses in order to remove all apparent drug references from the song. Despite some airplay and video play, the single failed to reach the top 40 on the UK Singles Chart, making it to number 43 on full release.

== Music video ==
The music video, directed by Kinga Burza features Calvin and his friends enjoying themselves to the song, in what appears to be Calvin's grandmother's house. The location is assumed when Calvin talks to his grandmother on the telephone, just moments before his friends arrive. At the end of the video, Calvin's grandmother arrives home to find the house in a mess and has a heart attack.

== Track listing ==
Maxi CD (FLYEYE 011)
No.	Title	Length
1.	"Merrymaking At My Place" (Radio Edit)	3:24
2.	"Wild Scenes"	3:54
3.	"Merrymaking At My Place" (Mr. Oizo Remix)	3:26
4.	"Merrymaking At My Place" (Kissy Sell Out Remix)	6:10

12" (FLYEYE 012)
No.	Title	Length
1.	"Merrymaking At My Place" (Album Version)	4:09
2.	"Merrymaking At My Place" (Mr. Oizo Remix)	3:26
3.	"Merrymaking At My Place" (Kissy Sell Out Remix)	6:10
4.	"The Girls" (Acapella)	3:14

iTunes exclusive
No.	Title	Length
1.	"Merrymaking At My Place" (Acoustic Version)	2:30
2.	"Merrymaking At My Place" (Deadmau5 Dub)	5:22
3.	"Merrymaking At My Place" (Deadmau5 Remix)	5:28

== Charts ==
Chart (2007)	Peak position
Australia Club (ARIA)	17
Scotland Singles (OCC)	23
UK Singles (OCC)	43
