= I Created Disco =

2007 studio album by Calvin Harris

Studio album by Calvin Harris
- Released: 15 June 2007
- Recorded: 2006–2007
- Studios: Calvinharrisbeats (Dumfries, Scotland)
- Genres: EDM; dance-pop
- Length: 55:23
- Labels: Fly Eye; Columbia
- Producer: Calvin Harris

Calvin Harris chronology
I Created Disco (2007)	Ready for the Weekend (2009)

Singles from I Created Disco
- 1. "Acceptable in the 80s" Released: 12 March 2007; 2. "The Girls" Released: 4 June 2007; 3. "Merrymaking at My Place" Released: 20 August 2007

I Created Disco is the debut studio album by the Scottish musician Calvin Harris, released on 15 June 2007 by Columbia Records. It was preceded by the singles "Acceptable in the 80s" and "The Girls", which both reached the top ten on both the Scottish Singles Charts and the UK Singles Chart. The album debuted at number six on the Scottish Albums Charts and eight on the UK Albums Chart with first-week sales of 16,121 copies in the United Kingdom.

On 23 May 2008, it was certified gold by the British Phonographic Industry (BPI). I Created Disco had sold 223,845 copies in the United Kingdom by November 2014.

== Writing and recording ==
The album was recorded and released during a period in which dance music was considered to be in decline, and this is said to have inspired the album's title. Critics highlighted the claim by Harris of having "created disco" as being far from the truth, however, Sam Davies from Mixmag Magazine claimed that the album did show "ramblings of a fictional producer-cum- mad-professor who did create disco", and said that I Created Disco showcases a "dazzling, psychedelic dystopia". In an interview in 2008, Harris expressed his criticism of dance music around the time he released the album, saying that dance music of that time "had no sort of tune and no melody" and this irritated him. The track "Colours" is an indication towards the frustration Harris felt for dance music at the time, particularly with the lyrics "it’s all very well stepping out in black and white".

Writing and recording for I Created Disco started in 2006 when Harris moved back to his hometown of Dumfries, Scotland, after living in London for two years. All recording and producing for the album took place on an Amiga computer with OctaMED, a music tracker, in Harris' home studio, called Calvinharrisbeats Studio. All 14 tracks on the album were written, produced and performed solely by Harris.

== Release and promotion ==
Preceding the release of the album, Columbia released two singles, "Acceptable in the 80s" and "The Girls", both of which achieved commercial success predominately in the United Kingdom and his native Scotland where they both reached the top ten in their respective singles charts. "The Girls" peaked at number one on the UK Dance Singles Charts, and was certified Silver by the British Phonographic Industry (BPI) in the United Kingdom, indicating sales in excess of 200,000 copies, whilst in Australia, it was certified Gold by the Australian Recording Industry Association (ARIA) for sales in excess of 35,000 copies. "Acceptable in the 80s" was certified 2x Platinum by ARIA in Australia, indicating sales in excess of 140,000, and Platinum by the BPI in the United Kingdom for sales in excess of 600,000 copies.

A third and final single was released from I Created Disco following the albums official release – "Merrymaking at My Place". It failed to match the commercial success of its predecessors, peaking at number twenty-three on the singles charts in his native Scotland, and number forty-three in the United Kingdom. Harris and his band supported both Faithless and Groove Armada on their live arena tours in the second quarter of 2007. The album cover was also used to promote the fourth generation iPod Nano in yellow.

The album was certified Gold in the United Kingdom by the BPI, selling 230,000 copies, and finished 2007 as the 199th best selling album in the United Kingdom.

== Critical reception ==
Professional ratings
Aggregate scores
Source	Rating
Metacritic	59/100
Review scores
Source	Rating
AllMusic	4/5 stars
Blender	3.5/5 stars
Drowned in Sound	1/10
The Guardian	1/5 stars
NME	7/10
Pitchfork	3.7/10
PopMatters	4/10
Stylus Magazine	B
Under the Radar	6/10

I Created Disco received mixed reviews from music critics. At Metacritic, which assigns a normalised rating out of 100 to reviews from mainstream publications, the album received an average score of 59, based on 17 reviews. Other notable reviews including The Guardian were more critical, awarding the album one out of five stars, saying "I Created Disco is witless and forever tripping over its own feet", and also criticised Harris's use of "two plodding instrumentals", saying that they "are bad enough, but on most tracks he chants repetitive lyrics so stupid they feel like an insult to the listener".

Meanwhile, Lou Thomas from the BBC was considerably more favourable of the album, saying Harris had "exquisitely tailored a calm, considered rumination on life’s great upheavals". They also praised Harris's "good sense of humour", and argued he ought to have had a sense of humour as a result of his claim of creating disco, highlighting that disco had in fact been created a significantly long time before Harris was even born. Thomas claimed that I Created Disco had "one glitterball of an idea, but it’s an idea put to great use", and suggested that the album would be perfect to listen to prior to going on a night out.

Drowned In Sound raised the question as to why Harris needed to release a debut album at all, despite the success of "Acceptable In the 80s", and said that, after a potential collaboration with the "queen of camp", Kylie Minogue, that Harris would perhaps be best seeing out the rest of his career as a record producer. Additionally, they urged the public to "buy everything other than the album", and to subsequently "leave I Created Disco to collect dust in the bargain bin, or, better still, the bins out the back of HMV".

== Track listing ==
All tracks are written by Calvin Harris.

No.	Title	Length
1.	"Merrymaking at My Place"	4:09
2.	"Colours"	4:01
3.	"This Is the Industry"	3:56
4.	"The Girls"	5:15
5.	"Acceptable in the 80s"	5:32
6.	"Neon Rocks"	3:48
7.	"Traffic Cops"	0:54
8.	"Vegas"	5:41
9.	"I Created Disco"	4:07
10.	"Disco Heat"	4:30
11.	"Vault Character"	0:08
12.	"Certified"	4:06
13.	"Love Souvenir"	4:18
14.	"Electro Man"	4:58

UK and Australian iTunes Store bonus track
No.	Title	Length
15.	"We're All the Same"	3:56

Italian iTunes Store bonus tracks
No.	Title	Length
15.	"Acceptable in the 80s" (Tom Neville Remix)	7:11
16.	"The Girls" (Groove Armada Remix)	8:04
17.	"Merrymaking at My Place" (Deadmau5 Remix)	5:28

Japanese edition bonus tracks
No.	Title	Length
15.	"Rock 'n Roll Attitude"	3:19
16.	"Love for You"	3:52
17.	"The Girls" (Groove Armada Remix)	8:03
18.	"Acceptable in the 80s" (Tom Neville Remix)	7:16

French edition bonus disc
No.	Title	Length
1.	"Rock 'n Roll Attitude"	3:19
2.	"We're All the Same"	3:56
3.	"Love for You"	3:52
4.	"Merrymaking at My Place" (Mr Oizo Remix)	3:29
5.	"Acceptable in the 80s" (Tom Neville Remix)	7:16
6.	"The Girls" (Groove Armada Remix)	8:03
7.	"The Girls" (Acoustic Version)	3:30

== Personnel ==
Credits adapted from the liner notes of I Created Disco.

- Calvin Harris – vocals, arrangement, instruments, production
- Guy Davie – mastering
- Joanne Morris – design

== Charts ==
=== Weekly charts ===
Chart (2007–2008)	Peak position
Australian Dance Albums (ARIA)	11
European Albums (Billboard)	32
French Albums (SNEP)	95
Irish Albums (IRMA)	34
Scottish Albums (Official Charts)	6
UK Albums (Official Charts)	8
UK Dance Albums (Official Charts)	1
US Top Dance Albums (Billboard)	19

=== Year-end charts ===
Chart (2007)	Position
UK Albums (OCC)	199
Chart (2009)	Position
UK Albums (OCC)	159

== Certifications ==
Region	Certification	Certified units/sales
United Kingdom (BPI)	Gold	230,000

== Release history ==
Region	Date	Label	Ref.
Ireland	15 June 2007	Fly Eye; Columbia	
United Kingdom	18 June 2007	Fly Eye; Columbia	
Japan	27 June 2007	Sony	
Australia	6 July 2007	Red Label	
United States	4 September 2007	Almost Gold	
Benelux	13 January 2008	PIAS	
France	4 February 2008	Cinq 7; Wagram	
Germany	18 April 2008	Ministry of Sound	
