= Down by the Riverside =

African-American spiritual

Down by the Riverside as midi
The melody to "Down by the Riverside"

"Down by the Riverside" (also known as "Ain't Gonna Study War No More" and "Gonna lay down my burden") is an African-American spiritual. Its roots date back to before the American Civil War, though it was first published in 1918 in Plantation Melodies: A Collection of Modern, Popular and Old-time Negro-Songs of the Southland, Chicago, the Rodeheaver Company. The song has alternatively been known as "Ain' go'n' to study war no mo'", "Ain't Gwine to Study War No More", "Down by de Ribberside", "Going to Pull My War-Clothes" and "Study war no more". The song was first recorded by the Fisk University jubilee quartet in 1920 (published by Columbia in 1922), and there are at least 14 black gospel recordings before World War II.

Because of its pacifistic imagery, "Down by the Riverside" has also been used as an anti-war protest song, especially during the Vietnam War. The song is also included in collections of socialist and labor songs.

== Lyrics ==
The song has many lyrical variations, though usually, each stanza follows a standard form, with one sentence that differs from one stanza to the next. The song often begins:

Gonna lay down my burden
Down by the riverside (3×)
Gonna lay down my burden
Down by the riverside

With the chorus:

I ain't gonna study war no more
Study war no more
Ain't gonna study war no more

Other lines that can appear in stanzas, in place of "Gonna lay down my burden", include:

- Gonna shake hands with every man
- Gonna lay down my heavy load
- Gonna lay down my sword and shield
- Gonna stick my sword in the golden sand
- Gonna try on my long white robe
- Gonna try on my starry crown
- Gonna put on my golden shoes
- Gonna talk with the Prince of Peace
- Gonna shake hands around the world
- Gonna cross the river Jordan
- Gonna climb up on that mountain
- Gonna climb the road to heaven
- Gonna walk down that road of peace
- Gonna take all of my brethren

== Themes ==
Much of this spiritual contains Biblical imagery. In general, the song is focused on the concept of leaving the feelings of anger and pessimism behind, as to have a new spiritual dress, in the setting of a riverside, prior to going across it.

The song suggests baptism in water, using the metaphor of crossing the River Jordan to enter the Promised Land in the Old Testament. The refrain of "ain't gonna study war no more" is a reference to a quotation from the Book of Isaiah, chapter 2, verse 4 (KJV): "nation shall not lift up sword against nation, neither shall they learn war any more." One of the lines also references Jesus Christ, specifically, "Gonna talk with the Prince of Peace," as the "Prince of Peace" is a common title for Jesus. In "Gonna climb the road to heaven," the road is a metaphor for the difficult journey of life, as a road and travel can be dangerous and full of trial. This sentiment is similar to the line, "Gonna climb up on that mountain," which again is symbolic of the arduous journey of life.

== Recordings ==
Artists who have recorded the song include:

- Al Hirt released a version on his 1961 album, He's the King and His Band. and a live version on his 1965 album, Live at Carnegie Hall
- American R&B and boogie-woogie pianist and singer Little Willie Littlefield recorded a version for his 1997 album The Red One.
- Arty Hall & His Radio Rubes, 1937
- Benjamin Luxton & David Willison, 1924
- Sister Rosetta Tharpe, 1944
- Big Bill Broonzy, 1952
- Bill Haley & His Comets performed a live twist version on the 1962 album Twistin' Knights at the Roundtable.
- Bing Crosby and Gary Crosby (recorded November 4, 1953 – reached No. 28 in the UK charts).
- The Blind Boys of Alabama (on Amazing Grace and Down in New Orleans)
- Bunk Johnson, 1942
- Chimène Badi, 2011 (Gospel & Soul album)
- Chris Barber's Jazz Band, 1954
- Dorothy Love Coates
- Clara Ward
- Cliff Holland
- C. Mae Frierson Moore, 1925
- Les Compagnons de la chanson (under the title Qu'il fait bon vivre)
- The Dirty Dozen Brass Band
- Dixie Jubilee Singers, 1928
- The Reverend Horatio Duncan & Amos Sweets, 2007
- The Dustbowl Revival, 2014
- Elvis Presley (on Frankie and Johnny and Million Dollar Quartet)
- Etta James
- The Four Knights
- The Four Lads, 1953
- Frederic Rzewski (a classical piano version)
- The Golden Echo Boys [Of God's Bible School], 1930
- Golden Gate Quartet
- Grandpa Elliott and other artists (Playing for Change project), 2014
- Jackie Venson on "Love Transcends," 2021
- Jimmy Durante
- Jimmie Lunceford & his Orchestra, 1940
- Jimmy Smith & Wes Montgomery, 1966
- The Kingpins
- Louis Armstrong (on Hello Louis! and Louis and the Good Book)
- Lead Belly
- Lester McFarland & Robert Gardner, 1927
- Muslim Magomayev, Soviet Union, 1972
- Mahalia Jackson
- Million Dollar Quartet, Broadway musical and original cast recording
- Michael Penn (on Mr. Hollywood Jr., 1947)
- Dr. Michael White, on his album Dancing in the Sky, 2004
- Missouri Pacific Diamond Jubilee Quartette, 1927
- Moon Mullican and the Plainsmen, early 1960s.
- Morehouse College Quartet, 1923
- Mustard & Gravy 'Dixie's Tastiest Combination', 1938
- Nat King Cole
- Norfolk Jazz & Jubilee Quartets, 1927
- Oscar Celestine, 1928
- Paul Anka (on his 1958 album Paul Anka)
- Pete Seeger
- Peter, Paul and Mary (on Around the Campfire)
- Raffi (on Bananaphone)
- The Ramblin' Riversiders
- The Real Ale and Thunder Band At Vespers, recorded at St. Laurence's Parish Church, Downton by BBC Radio Solent, 18 November 1984.
- Roy Hamilton
- Sam Morgan's Jazz Band, 1927
- The Seekers
- The Weavers
- Sister Rosetta Tharpe (included in the U.S. National Recording Registry)
- Snooks Eaglin, 1960
- Sonny Terry & Brownie McGhee
- Sweet Honey in the Rock (on We All...Everyone Of Us)
- Taj Mahal, 2013 (on Divided & United, ATO Records)
- Trini Lopez as part of a medley with "Gotta Travel On", "Marianne", "When the Saints Go Marching In", and "Volare".
- Van Morrison (on the CD reissue of Tupelo Honey)
- Vaughan Quartet, 1924
- Willie Nelson and Wynton Marsalis on their 2008 live album, Two Men with the Blues
- The Reverend Horatio Duncan & Amos Sweets, 2007
- Martha Reeves and the Vandellas, 1968

== Soundtrack appearances ==
The Reverend Horatio Duncan & Amos Sweets version was featured as a DLC in the Ubisoft games Just Dance 2 and Just Dance 3, and on the main track list of Just Dance: Summer Party.

It was used as background music in two episodes of SpongeBob SquarePants known as "Survival of the Idiots" and "Selling Out".

It was played in the Star Trek: The Next Generation episode "The Next Phase".

It appears in Trombone Champ.

It was played in Ted Lasso episode "Man City" as Isaac MacAdoo gives a haircut to Sam Obisanya with the team in the AFC Richmond locker room.

It was used during the credits of the final episode of Turning Point: The Vietnam War by Luminant Media and distributed by Netflix, though it does not seem to be in the official soundtrack.

It was also used in an episode of Law & Order season 22.

== Parodies and alternative lyrics ==
The song was the basis of an Allan Sherman parody called "Don't Buy the Liverwurst". The tune of "Down by the Riverside" was also used in a McDonald's's 1960s jingle, "McDonald's Is My Kind of Place". In episode 72 of the animated television series Animaniacs, this song was parodied as "U.N. Me" about the United Nations Headquarters and was later released on their 2nd album, Yakko's World.

In the UK, "Down by the Riverside" was parodied for use by a radio commercial on some local radio stations (namely Mix 107) about eco-friendly travel choices (i.e. leaving the car for one day a week).

JibJab also used the melody in a song about the year 2012 in review (called "2012: The End Is Here!").

An episode of Liv & Maddie had Liv singing a song about her musical group with senior citizens, "The Golden Chords, " at a retirement home, to the tune of this song.

== See also ==
- List of anti-war songs
