= Just Dance: Summer Party =

2011 video game

- North American box art
- Developer(s): Ubisoft Paris
- Publisher(s): Ubisoft
- Series: Just Dance
- Platform(s): Wii
- Release: UK: July 15, 2011; NA: July 19, 2011; EU/AU: July 21, 2011
- Genre(s): Music video game, rhythm
- Mode(s): Single player, multiplayer

Just Dance: Summer Party (known as Just Dance 2: Extra Songs in Australia and Europe) is a limited edition dance rhythm game developed by Ubisoft Paris and published by Ubisoft. It features all of the DLC and Best Buy exclusive songs from Just Dance 2 (except for "It's Not Unusual", "Crazy Christmas", "Spice Up Your Life", "Come on Eileen", and "Should I Stay or Should I Go") on a single disc, with that said title used as its basis. It was released in North America, Europe, and Australia in July 2011.

== Gameplay ==
Like Just Dance and Just Dance 2, up to four players can play to mirror on-screen dance choreography from over 20 songs, as they are judged on their ability to follow a dance routine to a chosen song. The different modes are all as the same as Just Dance 2, the "Classic", "Duets", "Simon Says", "Race", "Non-Stop Shuffle", and "Just Sweat". Along the game's track list are the DLC, and Best Buy exclusives from Just Dance 2, except "It's Not Unusual", "Crazy Christmas", "Spice Up Your Life", "Come on Eileen", and "Should I Stay or Should I Go". However all of them were planned to be in the game.

== Track list ==
The game features 23 songs, all from the downloadable content and Best Buy exclusives of Just Dance 2, except the aforementioned songs.

Song	Artist	Year
"American Boy"	Estelle feat. Kanye West	2008
"Barbie Girl"	Countdown Dee's Hit Explosion (as made famous by Aqua)	1997
"Born to Be Wild"	Steppenwolf	1968
"Cheesy Cha Cha" (Note: Warm Up song, found in the Extras menu.)	Christian Padovan, Stéphane Huguenin & Yves Sanna	2008
"Chicken Payback"	A Band of Bees	2004
"Crying Blood"	V V Brown	2008
"Down by the Riverside"	The Reverend Horatio Duncan and Amos Sweets	1927
"Firework"	Katy Perry	2010
"Funkytown"	Sweat Invaders (as made famous by Lipps Inc.)	1980
"Futebol Crazy"	The World Cup Girls	2003
"Here Comes the Hotstepper"	The Hit Crew (as made famous by Ini Kamoze)	1995
"Jai Ho! (You Are My Destiny)"	A. R. Rahman and The Pussycat Dolls feat. Nicole Scherzinger	2009
"Kung Fu Fighting (Doug Ruffy/Mark Wallis Remix)"	Carl Douglas	1974
"Mambo No. 5 (A Little Bit Of Monika)"	The Lemon Cubes (as made famous by Lou Bega)	1999
"Maniac"	Studio Allstars (as made famous by Michael Sembello)	1983
"Moving on Up"	The Lemon Cubes (as made famous by M People)	1993
"Nine in the Afternoon"	Panic! at the Disco	2008
"Pon de Replay"	Rihanna	2005
"Professeur Pumplestickle"	Nick Phoenix and Thomas J. Bergersen	2006
"Pump Up the Volume"	MARRS	1987
"Skin-To-Skin"	Sweat Invaders	1992
"Song 2"	Blur	1997
"Why Oh Why"	Stephane Huguenin, Yves Sanna and Christian Padovan (credited as Love Letter)	2007
"You Can't Hurry Love"	The Supremes	1966
