= Just Dance Wii =

2011 video game

- Cover art
- Developer: Ubisoft Paris
- Publisher: Nintendo
- Producer: Ubisoft
- Series: Just Dance
- Platform: Wii
- Release: JP: October 13, 2011
- Genres: Music, rhythm
- Modes: Single-player, multiplayer

Just Dance Wii (Note: Known in Japan as JUST DANCE(ジャストダンス) Wii) is a 2011 dance rhythm game developed by Ubisoft Paris and published by Nintendo. It was released for the Wii system on 13 October 2011 in Japan as the first Japanese installment in the Just Dance series published by Ubisoft.

== Gameplay ==
The game is based on Just Dance 2, as the user interface and features are largely identical to that game, with every feature available except the online store. Karaoke-styled lyrics is a brand new mechanic to the Just Dance series, which would later carryover to the main series, starting with the PS3 version of Just Dance 3. Lyrics are highlighted with an icon shown next to the line with a color, based on its icon (light blue for male vocals and pink for female vocals). Players can also choose to play the full version or the short version. A Tutorial mode is also available, showing how each mechanic in the game works.

== Track list ==
The game features 29 songs.

Song	Artist	Year
"Cheesy Cha Cha" (Note: Warm Up song, found in the Extras menu.) (Note: Previously featured on Just Dance 2)	APM Music	2010
"Choo Choo Train"	Exile (as made famous by Zoo)	2003
"Crazy in Love"	Studio Musicians (as made famous by Beyoncé featuring Jay-Z)	2003
"Cutie Honey"	Koda Kumi (as made famous by Yoko Maekawa)	2004
"Dagomba"	Sorcerer	2010
"Heavy Rotation"	AKB48	2010
"Hot Stuff"	Donna Summer	1979
"Jump in the Line"	Harry Belafonte	1961
"Jumpin'"	Kara	2010
"Just Mario" (Note: Unlockable by playing every other song in the game.) (Note: Available as downloadable content for the Wii version of Just Dance 3 in North America, Europe and Australia.) (Note: Exclusive to Just Dance Unlimited in the Nintendo Switch versions of Just Dance 2018 and on.)	Ubisoft Meets Nintendo (Originally composed by Koji Kondo)	2011
"Katti Kalandal"	Bollywood	2004
"Kimi ni Bump"	Ketsumeishi	2004
"Koi no Dial 6700"	Dream5	2011
"Mickey (Hawaii Version)"	Gorie with Jasmine and Joann	2004
"Mister (Japanese Version)"	Kara	2010
"One Night Carnival"	Kishidan	2001
"Rasputin"	Boney M.	1978
"Ren'ai Revolution 21"	Morning Musume	2000
"S.O.S."	Rihanna	2006
"Sexy Girl"	Namie Amuro	2008
"Survival Dance 'No No Cry More'"	TRF	1994
"Toxic"	The Hit Crew (as made famous by Britney Spears)	2004
"U Can't Touch This" (Note: Previously featured on Just Dance)	MC Hammer	1990
"UFO" (Note: Also playable in Tutorial Mode.)	Pink Lady	1977
"Valenti"	BoA	2002
"Wannabe"	Spice Girls	1996
"Why? (Keep Your Head Down)"	TVXQ	2011
"Won't Be Long"	Exile and Koda Kumi (as made famous by Da Bubblegum Brothers)	2006
"You Can't Hurry Love" (Note: Previously featured as a downloadable track on Just Dance 2)	The Supremes	1966

== Reception ==
According to Media Create, as of 11 March 2012, the game sold 560,301 copies in Japan.
