= Thomas Sparks =

Thomas Sparks may refer to

- Thomas E. Sparks, member of the Arkansas House of Representatives
- Thomas Sparks, a sailing ship chartered by the New Zealand Company in 1842
- Tommy Sparks (born 1986), a Swedish-born English singer-songwriter from London
- Tommy Sparks (album), a debut album for Tommy Sparks
- Tully Sparks (1874–1937), baseball pitcher in the Major Leagues from 1897 to 1910
