= Dagomba =

Dagomba may refer to:

- Dagomba people, an ethnic group of Northern Ghana
- Dagomba language (Dagbani), a Gur language spoken in Ghana
- "Dagomba", a song by Sorcerer, published in the music video game Just Dance 2
