= Just Dance 2 =

2010 video game

- North American box art
- Developer: Ubisoft Paris
- Publisher: Ubisoft
- Series: Just Dance
- Platform: Wii
- Release: NA: October 12, 2010; PAL: October 14, 2010
- Genres: Music, rhythm
- Modes: Single-player, multiplayer

Just Dance 2 is a 2010 dance rhythm game developed by Ubisoft Paris and published by Ubisoft. The game was released exclusively for the Wii on October 12 of 2010, in North America and in Australia and Europe on October 14, 2010, as a sequel to Just Dance and the second main installment of the series.

Just Dance 2 focused primarily on improvements and enhancements to the original game, including the addition of new co-operative "Duet" routines, a team-based "Dance Battle" mode, a "Non-Stop Shuffle" mode, a new exergaming-oriented mode known as "Just Sweat", and paid downloadable content.

Just Dance 2 was released to positive reviews, with critics praising the game for its noticeable quality improvements in comparison to the original Just Dance, its new features and modes, and its continued positioning as a multiplayer "party game" experience accessible to a casual audience. As of January 2011, Just Dance 2 had sold over 5 million copies, making it the third best-selling third-party Wii title, and the second best-selling game in the series, behind the sequel, Just Dance 3, which is also the best-selling third-party Wii game.

== Gameplay ==
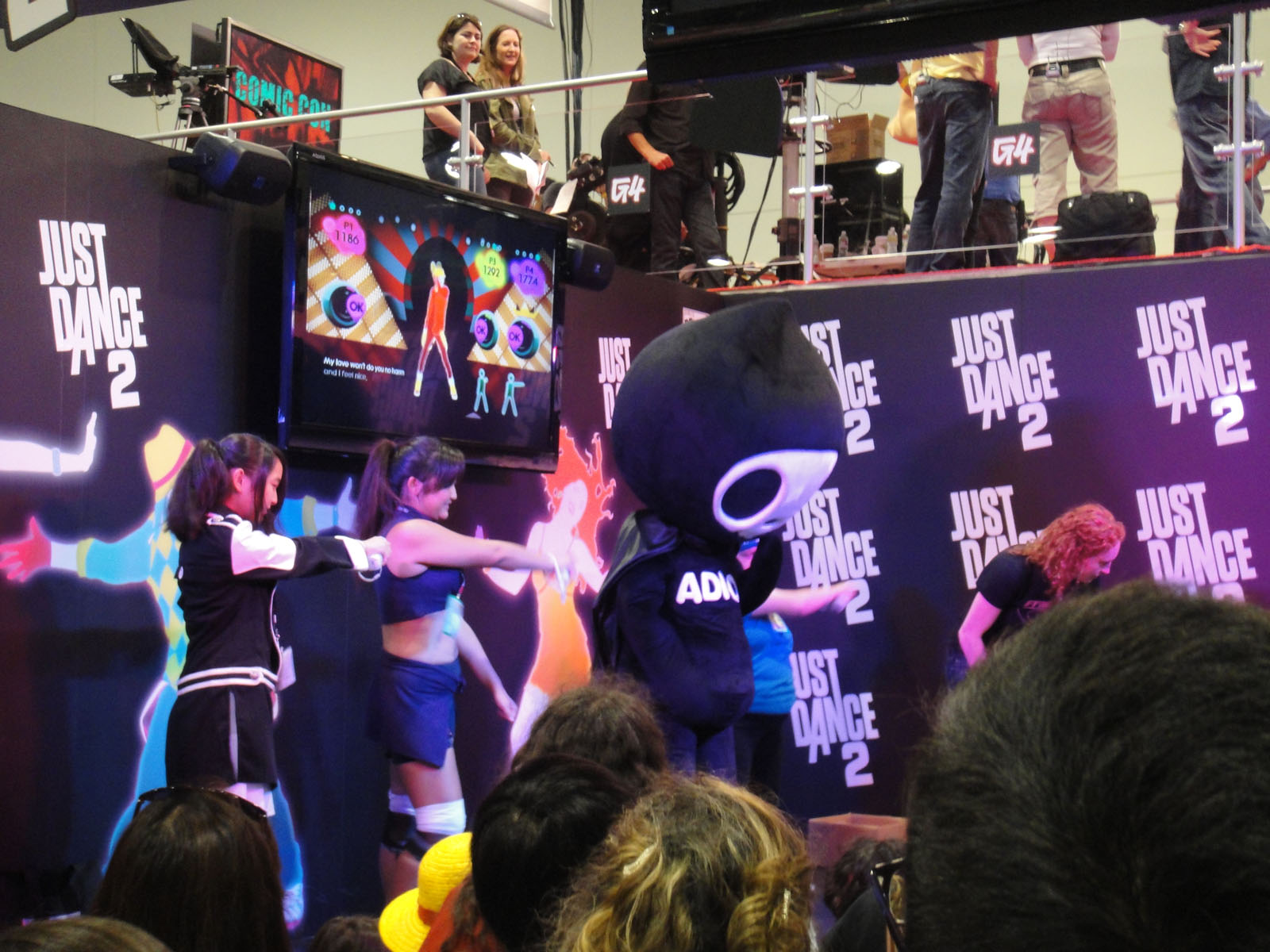
Just Dance 2 booth at San Diego Comic-Con 2010

The gameplay of Just Dance 2 remains similar to the original; while holding a Wii Remote in their right hand, players must mimic the routine of an on-screen dancer to a chosen song. The dancers in each song now wear colored gloves for better motion detection. Players are judged based on their accuracy, scoring points. Players can choose between the full version and the short version. Unlike the first game, there are no animated score icons, instead, there are different on-screen names for players to choose from. Also, there are four judgements for regular moves, the "X" and "OK" judgements remain the same and the two new judgements are "Good" and "Perfect". While the "X" has the same meaning as the previous game, "OK" now means that the player tried, but isn't quite there. "Good" means that the player is almost there, and "Perfect" means the same as "Great" in the previous game. All of the shake moves have been replaced with gold moves, where instead of shaking their Wii Remotes, all of the players have to follow the gold pictograms. If a player doesn't get the gold move, they get an "X". If the player does an awesome job on the gold move, they get a "Yeah" and bonus points. In addition to these new features, players receives a rating out of 5 stars (each star is worth 2,000 points, with 10,000 points required for 5 stars, and 13,333 points as the maximum score) as well as the "Gold Move" motive (from the number of gold moves done) and the "On Fire" motive (from mostly Goods and Perfects in a row) at the end of the song.

Selected songs offer "Duet" modes, which feature choreography designed for two players. The lyrics are in the middle of the two dancers, and pictograms are on the left and right sides of the lyrics. The odd-numbered players always get the left-sided dancer, while the even-numbered players always get the right-sided one. A new mode known as "Dance Battle" was also introduced; it is a team-based mode in which players compete across a series of songs and minigames to earn points for their team. The mode can be played by up to eight players, divided into two teams of four. Minigames in this mode include "Simon Says" and "Race". "Medleys" are videos showing short segments from five random songs switching over one by one. A new song-shuffling gameplay mode known as "Non-Stop Shuffle" was introduced as well; it is a mode where songs are played in a random order without selecting a song from the soundtrack.

A new exercise-focused gameplay mode known as "Just Sweat" was also added; the mode is designed to serve as a daily exercise regiment, allowing one player at a time to select an intensity-based selection of songs. Activity in Just Sweat mode is gauged using "sweat points".

== Track list ==
The game features 48 songs, and additional downloadable content (DLC).

Note: All DLC is no longer available for purchase due to the removal of Wii Points on March 26, 2018, and the shutdown of the Wii Shop Channel on January 30, 2019. However, most of those are still found on the Just Dance: Summer Party disc.

Song	Artist	Year
"A-Punk"	Vampire Weekend	2008
"Alright"	Supergrass	1995
"American Boy" (Note: Available as downloadable content.)	Estelle featuring Kanye West	2008
"Baby Girl"	Reggaeton	2009
"Barbie Girl"	Countdown Dee's Hit Explosion (as made famous by Aqua)	1997
"Big Girl (You Are Beautiful)"	MIKA	2007
"Body Movin' (Fatboy Slim Remix)"	Beastie Boys	1998
"Born To Be Wild"	Steppenwolf	1967
"Call Me"	Blondie	1980
"Cheesy Cha Cha" (Note: Warm Up song, found in the Extras menu.)	Christian Padovan, Stéphane Huguenin & Yves Sanna	2008
"Chicken Payback"	A Band of Bees	2004
"Come On Eileen" (Note: Not on Just Dance: Summer Party.)	Dexys Midnight Runners	1982
"Cosmic Girl"	Jamiroquai	1996
"Crazy Christmas"	Santa Clones	2000
"Crazy In Love"	Studio Musicians (as made famous by Beyoncé featuring Jay-Z)	2003
"Crying Blood"	V V Brown	2008
"D.A.N.C.E."	Justice	2007
"Dagomba"	Sorcerer	2010
"Down By The Riverside"	The Reverend Horatio Duncan and Amos Sweets	1927
"Firework"	Katy Perry	2010
"Funkytown" (Note: Exclusive to copies sold by Best Buy.)	Sweat Invaders (as made famous by Lipps Inc.)	1980
"Futebol Crazy"	The World Cup Girls	2010
"Girlfriend"	Avril Lavigne	2007
"Here Comes The Hotstepper"	The Hit Crew (as made famous by Ini Kamoze)	1994
"Hey Ya!"	Outkast	2003
"Holiday"	The Hit Crew (as made famous by Madonna)	1983
"Hot Stuff"	Donna Summer	1979
"Idealistic"	Digitalism	2007
"I Got You (I Feel Good)"	James Brown	1965
"Iko Iko"	Mardi Gras	1953
"It's Not Unusual"	Tom Jones	1965
"It's Raining Men"	The Weather Girls	1982
"I Want You Back"	The Jackson 5	1969
"Jai Ho! (You Are My Destiny)"	A. R. Rahman and The Pussycat Dolls featuring Nicole Scherzinger	2009
"Jump"	Studio Allstars (as made famous by Kris Kross)	1992
"Jump in the Line"	Harry Belafonte	1961
"Jungle Boogie"	Studio Musicians (as made famous by Kool & the Gang)	1973
"Katti Kalandal"	Tony Tape, Veilumuth Chitralekha (credited as Bollywood)	2004
"Kung Fu Fighting (Dave Ruffy/Mark Wallis Remix)"	Carl Douglas	1974
"Mambo No. 5 (A Little Bit Of Monika)"	Lou Bega	1999
"Maniac"	Studio Allstars (as made famous by Michael Sembello)	1983
"Monster Mash"	The Frighteners (as made famous by Bobby "Boris" Pickett)	1962
"Move Your Feet"	Junior Senior	2002
"Moving On Up"	M People	1993
"Mugsy Baloney"	Charleston	2010
"Nine In The Afternoon"	Panic! at the Disco	2008
"Pon De Replay"	Rihanna	2005
"Professor Pumplestickle"	Nick Phoenix and Thomas J. Bergersen	2006
"Proud Mary"	Ike and Tina Turner	1971
"Pump Up The Volume"	M/A/R/R/S	1987
"Rasputin"	Boney M.	1978
"Rockafeller Skank"	Fatboy Slim	1998
"S.O.S."	Rihanna	2006
"Satisfaction (Isak Original Extended)"	Benny Benassi presents "The Biz"	2002
"Should I Stay Or Should I Go"	The Clash	1982
"Skin-To-Skin"	Sweat Invaders	2008
"Song 2"	Blur	1997
"Soul Bossa Nova"	Quincy Jones & His Orchestra	1962
"Spice Up Your Life"	Spice Girls	1997
"Sway (Quien Sera)"	Marine Band (as made famous by Michael Bublé)	2003
"Sympathy For The Devil (Fatboy Slim Remix)"	The Rolling Stones	1968
"Take Me Out"	Franz Ferdinand	2004
"That's Not My Name"	The Ting Tings	2008
"The Power"	Snap!	1990
"The Shoop Shoop Song (It's In His Kiss)"	Cher	1990
"TiK ToK"	Ke$ha	2009
"Toxic" (Note: The original version of this song appears on Just Dance 2023 Edition, with the Just Dance 2 routine appearing in that game as an alternate routine.)	The Hit Crew (as made famous by Britney Spears)	2004
"Viva Las Vegas"	Elvis Presley	1964
"Wake Me Up Before You Go Go"	Wham!	1984
"Walk Like An Egyptian"	Bangles	1986
"When I Grow Up" (Note: Also features three alternate routines from contest winners from the United States, the United Kingdom and France, respectively.)	The Pussycat Dolls	2008
"Why Oh Why"	Stephane Huguenin, Yves Sanna and Christian Padovan (credited as Love Letter)	2007
"You Can't Hurry Love"	The Supremes	1966

== Reception ==
Reception

Aggregate score
Aggregator	Score
Metacritic	74/100

Review scores
Publication	Score
CNET Gamecenter	7.5/10
Eurogamer	8/10
Gamekult	6/10
GameSpot	7/10
IGN	8/10
Jeuxvideo.com	14/20
Nintendo Life	8/10
Official Nintendo Magazine	72%
The Guardian	3/5
VideoGamer.com	7/10

Critics suggested Just Dance 2 would be a good competitor with a similar motion-control dance game by Harmonix, Dance Central (2010), in that the purchase of an expensive Kinect camera was not required.

Just Dance 2 was commended for being a great social experience with friends, which was frequently attributed to its choreography described as "goofy," "absolutely ridiculous," "silly," "ludicrous," and filled with "playful touches," "comical spins, jumps, and crossovers." Explained Keza MacDonald of IGN, "The measure of any social video game is the memorable moments they create – the evenings (or wee small drunken hours) spent floundering in the face of doing the robot to Satisfaction, watching a friend topple head-over-arse attempting Ra-Ra-Rasputin's cossack dancing, the mildly awkward moment in the middle of The Shoop Shoop Song where you accidentally meet your duet partner's eyes." A common highlight was the ballet dance segment in "A-Punk"'s choreography; Wrote Martin Gaston of Video Gamer, "there is simply no way for two fat men to look cool when trying to pirouette around each other in Vampire Weekend's A-Punk, for instance, but seeing as it's so outlandish you don't have to worry about looking like a pleb."

In addition the variety of choreographies and songs, the addition of new modes (especially towards the "Duet"), a download store, and improvements in motion control detection and presentation (specifically the "much less amateurish" score meters and incorporation of animated backgrounds,) were praised. Opined Martin Gaston of Video Gamer,

Backgrounds are more detailed than the tacky last-minute Photoshop gradients of the original, and the on-screen displays have siphoned off a bit of Strictly Come Dancing's excess pizzazz. The screen is also less cluttered, with the game able to convey the same information as before without taking up half the screen with long vibrating bars and a pair of sunglasses (my favourite icon) having an epileptic fit [sic] at the top.

In describing how Just Dance 2 differentiated itself from other dance games, IGN explained, "many dance games recycle the same old moves for every song, but not this. The dancers on-screen are even decked out in appropriate gear: swaying wigs, robot suits, flares, canes and even bobble hats."

Problems from the first Just Dance game were noted. Motion controls were claimed to still be imprecise sometimes, Nintendo Life reporting its reporters "experienced more than a few dance battles with questionable end results." Additionally, "there's almost nothing for a solo player to do," wrote Will Holdsworth. Some critics also found the DLC song prices a little too high.

Sales of Just Dance 2 surpassed those of the original; with over 5 million copies as of January 2011, it was the best-selling third-party title for the Wii. Laurent Detoc, CEO of Ubisoft's North American operations, stated that this achievement "[solidified] the Just Dance brand as a pop culture phenomenon." Just Dance 2 was nominated for Best Music/Rhythm Game of the year by GameFocus, but lost to DJ Hero 2 for Multi-platform Game Console.

== Other release ==
A Best Buy Edition (titled Just Dance 2: Special Edition in-game) was released in North America which included three exclusive songs which are The Clash's "Should I Stay or Should I Go", Lipps Inc.'s "Funkytown" (covered by Sweat Invaders in-game) and A. R. Rahman and The Pussycat Dolls' "Jai Ho (You Are My Destiny)" featuring Nicole Scherzinger.
