= Just Dance 3 =

2011 video game

- North American Wii cover art
- Developers: Ubisoft Paris (Wii); Ubisoft Reflections (PlayStation 3); Ubisoft Montreal (Xbox 360)
- Publisher: Ubisoft
- Series: Just Dance
- Platforms: Wii, Xbox 360, PlayStation 3
- Release: Wii: NA: October 7, 2011; PAL: October 11, 2011; Xbox 360 & PlayStation 3: NA: December 6, 2011; AU: December 8, 2011; EU: December 9, 2011
- Genres: Music, rhythm
- Modes: Single-player, multiplayer

Just Dance 3 is a 2011 dance rhythm game released on the Wii, Xbox 360, and PlayStation 3 with Kinect and Move support respectively for the latter two. It is part of the Just Dance video game series published by Ubisoft originally on the Wii and the third main installment of the series. Just Dance 3 was announced shortly after the release of Just Dance 2 and was released for the Wii and Xbox 360 on October 7, 2011 in North America and October 11, 2011 in Australia and Europe and for the PlayStation 3 on December 6, 2011 in North America, December 8, 2011 in Australia and December 9, 2011 in Europe. Just Dance 3 received positive reviews from critics and is the best-selling third-party Wii game of all-time, with sales of 9.92 million.

== Gameplay ==
Like its predecessors, up to four players can play to mirror on-screen dance choreography from over 40 songs, as they are judged on their ability to follow a dance routine to a chosen song. During gameplay, the progress bar is displayed above the boomboxes that blast out the five judgements, with stars being obtained during the song. Along with Solo and Duet modes, Just Dance 3 features a Dance Crew mode which allows 4 players to dance together, each with their own unique choreography, as well as playlists that group songs into different categories. Players can now choose which dancer to play as for a Duet or Dance Crew song. The lyrics for the Duet songs are now on the left side of the screen like Solo songs, and the pictograms for each dancer in Duet and Dance Crew songs are placed together on the right side. On the PS3 version, a toggable option for karaoke-styled lyrics (with lyrics colored in yellow for both male and female vocals), in the same vein as the Japanese exclusive Just Dance game on the Wii, Just Dance Wii, is included. For Dance Crew songs, the boomboxes that blast out the five judgements are located on the left side of each player's progress bar. Players can unlock gifts such as new songs, game modes, as well as Dance Mashups which combines different dance routines in this game and the previous two installments of the Just Dance series into one song. Returning features in the game include Non-Stop Shuffle, Speed Shuffle, Medley, Simon Says and Just Sweat.

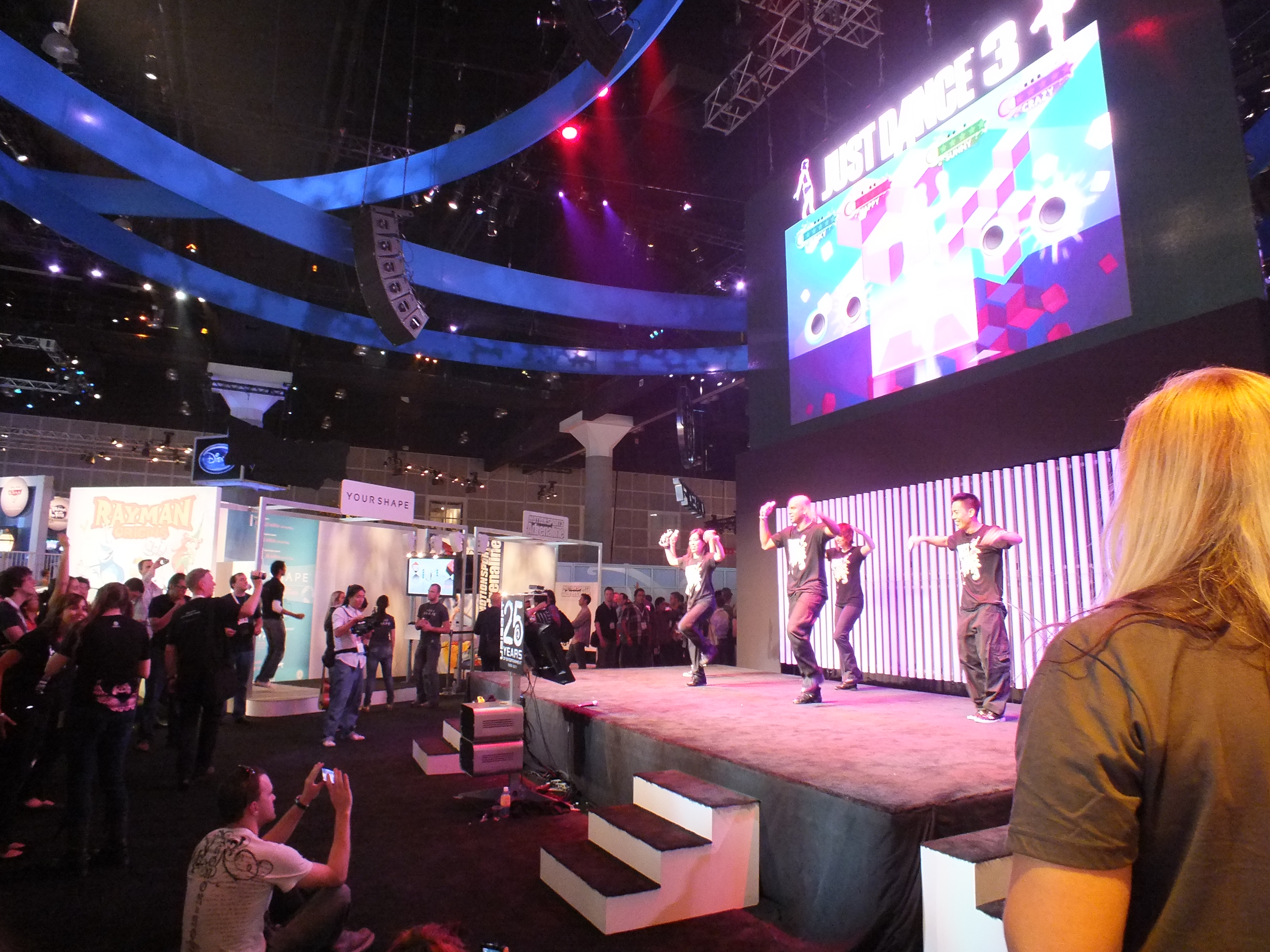
People playing Just Dance 3 at E3 2011

The Wii and PlayStation 3 versions have a Hold My Hand dance mode, where two players can share a Wii Remote or PlayStation Move Motion controller to dance. The Xbox 360 version has the ability to choose between the full version or the short version, and features two difficulties for both game modes, "Easy", where the player can use only their hands to score, and "Normal", where the player can use their entire body to score, as well as a "Shout Out" feature that uses the Kinect's voice recognition function, respectively, to sing the colored on-screen lyric in light blue when an icon appears. If successful, an additional Mojo point is earned. It also features a Just Create mode in which players can create their own routines with the Kinect. They can be saved, shared with their friends online and be played just like any other Just Dance routine.

== Track list ==
The game features 57 songs.

Notes:

- In the Xbox 360 version, all the songs are listed alphabetically while in the Wii and PS3 versions, the songs are in the order listed below.
- In the Xbox 360 version, the Dance Mash-Up for "Pump It" is unlocked as part of Ubisoft Connect rewards.
- In the Xbox 360 version menu "...Baby One More Time" does not appear first because it is credited as "Baby One More Time".

Song	Artist	Year
"California Gurls" (Note: Also available on the Xbox 360 demo version of the game, with the short version only being playable in the main "Dance" mode.)	Katy Perry featuring Snoop Dogg	2010
"Take On Me"	a-ha	1985
"Pump It"	The Black Eyed Peas	2006
"Lollipop"	Mika	2007
"Promiscuous"	Nelly Furtado featuring Timbaland	2006
"...Baby One More Time"	The Girly Team (as made famous by Britney Spears)	1998
"Price Tag"	Jessie J featuring B.o.B	2011
"I Don't Feel Like Dancin'"	Scissor Sisters	2006
"Marcia Baila" (Note: PAL regions only)	Les Rita Mitsouko	1984
"Barbra Streisand" (Note: The extreme version of this song can be unlocked with a secret Konami-like code on the D-pad.)	Duck Sauce	2010
"Venus"	Bananarama	1986
"No Limit"	2 Unlimited	1993
"Dynamite"	Taio Cruz	2010
"Teenage Dream" (Note: Exclusive to copies sold by Best Buy, also available with PAL Special Edition)	Katy Perry	2010
"Only Girl (In the World)" (Note: Exclusive to copies sold by Target/Zellers, also available on the PAL Xbox 360 version)	Rihanna	2010
"Forget You"	Cee Lo Green	2010
"Jump (for My Love)"	Girls Aloud	2003
"Gonna Make You Sweat (Everybody Dance Now)"	Sweat Invaders (as made famous by C+C Music Factory featuring Freedom Williams)	1990
"What You Waiting For"	Gwen Stefani	2004
"Crazy Little Thing Called Love"	Queen	1979
"Think"	The London Theatre Orchestra & Cast (as made famous by Aretha Franklin)	1968
"Boogie Wonderland"	Groove Century (as made famous by Earth, Wind & Fire featuring The Emotions)	1979
"Hey Boy Hey Girl"	The Chemical Brothers	1999
"E.T."	Katy Perry	2011
"Boom"	Reggaeton Storm (as made famous by MC Magico and Alex Wilson)	2005
"Da Funk"	Daft Punk	1995
"I Feel Love"	Donna Summer	1977
"Dance All Nite"	Anja	2011
"Spectronizer"	Sentai Express	2011
"Party Rock Anthem" (Note: Also available on the Xbox 360 demo version of the game, with the short version only being playable in the "Just Create" mode.)	LMFAO featuring Lauren Bennett and GoonRock	2011
"Are You Gonna Go My Way"	Lenny Kravitz	1993
"Land of 1000 Dances"	Wilson Pickett	1966
"She's Got Me Dancing"	Tommy Sparks	2009
"Jamaican Dance"	Konshens	2011
"Let's Go to the Mall"	Robin Sparkles (Note: The original singer of the song is Cobie Smulders, but was credited as Robin Sparkles, the stage name for her character Robin Scherbatsky from the sitcom How I Met Your Mother.)	2006
"Night Boat to Cairo"	Madness	1979
"I'm So Excited"	The Pointer Sisters	1982
"Video Killed the Radio Star"	The Buggles	1979
"Kurio ko uddah le jana" (Note: The song is actually titled "Didi Tera Devar Deewana".)	Lata Mangeshkar and S.P. Balasubrahmanyam (credited as Bollywood Rainbow)	1994
"Giddy on Up (Giddy on Out)"	Laura Bell Bundy	2010
"I Was Made for Lovin' You"	Kiss	1979
"Tightrope (Solo Version)"	Janelle Monáe	2010
"Airplanes"	B.o.B featuring Hayley Williams of Paramore	2010
"Beautiful Liar"	Countdown Mix Masters (as made famous by Beyoncé and Shakira)	2007
"Apache (Jump On It)"	The Sugarhill Gang	1981
"Pata Pata"	African Ladies (as made famous by Miriam Makeba)	1967
"Satellite"	Lena Meyer-Landrut	2010
"Somethin' Stupid"	Robbie Williams and Nicole Kidman	2001
"This Is Halloween"	Danny Elfman	1993
"Jambo Mambo" (Note: PS3 only; previously available as DLC on Wii.)	Ole Orquesta	1997
"Baby Don't Stop Now"	Anja	2011
"Twist and Shake It"	The Girly Team (as made famous by Ben Wheeler and Tara Chinn)	2010
"Soul Searchin"	Groove Century (as made famous by Stephen Emil Dudas and Mark G. Hart)	1979
"Baby Zouk" (Note: Unlockable depending on the player's mojo.)	Dr. Creole	2011
"Hungarian Dance No. 5"	Johannes Brahms (Brahms by Just Dance Classical Orchestra)	1880
"Mamasita"	Latino Sunset	2011
"The Master Blaster"	Inspector Marceau	1969

=== Downloadable content ===
Notes:

- Songs from previous Just Dance games, along with new songs, are downloadable content for Just Dance 3. The Xbox 360 version also had a free demo version, showing a short sample version of the song, with scores not being saved and Mojo Points are not added to the total.
- Downloadable content is not available for the PlayStation 3. The four Wii exclusive tracks are in the main playlist instead.
- Downloadable content is no longer available for the Wii following the removal of Wii Points and the shutdown of the Wii Shop Channel in January of 2019
- Downloadable content is no longer available for the Xbox 360 following the shutdown of the Xbox Live Marketplace.

Song	Artist	Year	Release Date
"Baby Don't Stop Now" (Note: Wii only; later available in the main tracklist for the PS3 version.)	Anja	2011	October 7, 2011
"Jambo Mambo"	Olé Orquesta	1997	October 7, 2011
"Soul Searchin"	Groove Century (as made famous by Stephen Emil Dudas and Mark G. Hart)	1999	October 7, 2011
"Twist and Shake It"	The Girly Team (as made famous by Ben Wheeler and Tara Chinn)	2009	October 7, 2011
"U Can't Touch This"	Groove Century (as made famous by MC Hammer)	1990	October 7, 2011 (1 re-release)
"Fame"	Irene Cara (credited as In the Style of Irene Cara)	1980	October 7, 2011 (1 re-release)
"Heart of Glass" (Note: Xbox 360 only.)	Blondie	1979	October 7, 2011 (1 re-release)
"Jin-Go-Lo-Ba"	Fatboy Slim	2004	November 15, 2011 (1 re-release)
"Cosmic Girl"	Jamiroquai	1996	November 15, 2011 (2 re-release)
"Jump in the Line"	The Sunlight Shakers (as made famous by Harry Belafonte)	2011	November 15, 2011 (2 re-release)
"Satisfaction (Isak Original Extended)"	Benny Benassi	2003	November 15, 2011 (2 re-release)
"Toxic"	The Hit Crew (as made famous by Britney Spears)	2003	November 23, 2011 (2 re-release)
"Acceptable in the 80s"	Calvin Harris	2007	November 23, 2011 (1 re-release)
"Jump"	Kris Kross	1991	November 23, 2011 (2 re-release)
"Proud Mary"	Ike and Tina Turner	1971	November 23, 2011 (2 re-release)
"Walk Like an Egyptian"	The Bangles	1986	December 6, 2011 (2 re-release)
"Iko Iko"	Mardi Gras	1953	December 6, 2011 (2 re-release)
"Baby Girl"	Reggaeton	2009	December 6, 2011 (2 re-release)
"Mashed Potato Time"	Dee Dee Sharp	1962	December 6, 2011 (1 re-release)
"Just Mario" (Note: Wii only; previously featured as an unlockable for Just Dance Wii in Japan, with a minor adjustment, with the TV turning on before the routine starts.)	Ubisoft Meets Nintendo (originally composed by Koji Kondo)	2011	December 14, 2011
"Crazy Christmas"	Santa Clones	2010	December 20, 2011 (2 re-release)
"Step by Step"	New Kids on the Block	1990	December 20, 2011 (1 re-release)
"Funplex" (CCS Remix)	The B-52's	2008	December 20, 2011 (1 re-release)
"Louie Louie"	Iggy Pop	1993	December 20, 2011 (1 re-release)
"I Like to Move It (Radio Mix)"	Groove Century (as made famous by Reel 2 Real feat. The Mad Stuntman)	1993	January 4, 2012 (1 re-release)
"Beat Match Until I'm Blue"	Sweat Invaders	2011	January 4, 2012
"Dun N Dusted"	Sweat Invaders	2011	January 4, 2012
"Touch Me Want Me"	Sweat Invaders	2011	January 4, 2012
"Cardiac Caress"	Lee Richardson, Richard Macklin & Tom Ford (credited as Sweat Invaders)	2011	January 18, 2012
"Boomsday"	Sweat Invaders	2011	January 18, 2012
"Merengue"	Sweat Invaders	2011	January 18, 2012
"Who Let the Dogs Out?"	The Sunlight Shakers (as made famous by Baha Men)	2000	January 18, 2012 (1 re-release)
"Katti Kalandal"	Bollywood	1980	February 1, 2012 (2 re-release)
"Why Oh Why"	Stephane Huguenin, Yves Sanna and Christian Padovan (credited as Love Letter)	2010	February 1, 2012 (2 re-release)
"The Power"	Snap!	1990	February 1, 2012 (2 re-release)
"Skin-To-Skin"	Sweat Invaders	2010	February 1, 2012 (2 re-release)
"Rasputin"	Boney M.	1978	February 15, 2012 (2 re-release)
"Mugsy Baloney"	Charleston	1924	February 15, 2012 (2 re-release)
"That's the Way (I Like It)"	KC and the Sunshine Band	1975	February 15, 2012 (1 re-release)
"Kids in America"	Kim Wilde	1981	March 12, 2012 (1 re-release)
"Down by the Riverside"	The Reverend Horatio Duncan and Amos Sweets	1927	March 12, 2012 (2 re-release)
"Professor Pumplestickle"	Nick Phoenix and Thomas J. Bergersen	2006	March 12, 2012 (2 re-release)
"Dare"	Gorillaz	2005	March 12, 2012 (1 re-release)
"Alright"	Supergrass	1994	April 25, 2012 (2 re-release)
"Dagomba"	Sorcerer	2010	April 25, 2012 (2 re-release)
"Futebol Crazy"	The World Cup Girls	2010	April 25, 2012 (2 re-release)
"It's Raining Men"	The Weather Girls	1982	April 25, 2012 (2 re-release)

==== Packs ====
Name	Artists	Songs	Release Date
Sweat Pack #1	Sweat Invaders	Beat Match Until I'm Blue; Dun N Dusted; Touch Me Want Me	January 4, 2012
Sweat Pack #2	Sweat Invaders	Boomsday; Cardiac Caress; Merengue	January 17, 2012
Christmas Pack	The Bangles; Mardi Gras; Reggaeton; Dee Dee Sharp	Walk Like an Egyptian; Iko Iko; Baby Girl; Mashed Potato Time	January 17, 2012
Valentine Pack (Note: Wii only.)	Bollywood; Sweat Invaders; Love Letter	Katti Kalandal; Skin-To-Skin; Why Oh Why	February 1, 2012
Spring Break Pack #1	Kim Wilde; The Reverend Horatio Duncan and Amos Sweets; Gorillaz; Nick Phoenix and Thomas J. Bergersen	Kids in America; Down By The Riverside; Dare; Professor Pumplestickle	March 12, 2012
Spring Break Pack #2	The World Cup Girls; Supergrass; Sorcerer	Futebol Crazy; Alright; Dagomba	April 25, 2012

== Reception ==
Reception

Aggregate scores
Aggregator	Score		
Aggregator	PS3	Wii	Xbox 360
GameRankings	72%	75.3%	69.7%
Metacritic	75/100	74/100	70/100

Review scores
Publication	Score		
Publication	PS3	Wii	Xbox 360
Eurogamer			7/10
Game Informer			6/10
Gamekult			6/10
GameSpot		7/10	8/10
GamesRadar+			3.5/5
Giant Bomb			2/5
IGN		8/10	8.5/10
Jeuxvideo.com	15/20		
Nintendo Life		9/10	
Official Nintendo Magazine		68%	
PlayStation Official Magazine – Australia	8/10		
PlayStation Official Magazine – UK	7/10		
Official Xbox Magazine (US)			7/10
Push Square	8/10		
VideoGamer.com			7/10

=== Critical reception ===
Ubisoft's third installment in the Just Dance series received mostly mixed to positive reviews from critics, receiving a 75.30% of the Wii and a 69.70% for the Xbox 360 on GameRankings. With the most positive review for the Wii being from Nintendo Life giving a 9/10, and the least positive of which being Official Nintendo Magazine UK, giving it a 68/100. For the Xbox 360, the most positive review came from IGN, giving it an 8.5/10 and the most negative came from GamingExcellence, which gave it a 5.4/10.

=== Commercial performance ===
According to Gamasutra's weekly column, Just Dance 3 was the number one selling multi-platform game of the week in North America and Japan on the week of October 13, 2011 in the form of the Wii version, and was number two in the UK. This means that of all the games on all systems, the Wii version of Just Dance 3 was the week's best selling game overall in Japan and North America in those regions, and number two in the UK, only behind Forza Motorsport 4. The Xbox 360 version did not chart, meaning it failed to hit the top 5. Of the top 5 selling Wii games in Japan, North America and the UK, however, the game was number one in all regions. Just Dance 3 is the best-selling third-party Wii game, with over 9.92 million copies sold as of June 11, 2014.

== Awards and nominations ==
=== 15th Annual Interactive Achievement Awards ===
Year	Nominated work	Award	Result
2012	Just Dance 3	Family Game of the Year	Nominated

=== British Academy Children's Awards ===
Year	Nominated work	Award	Result
2011	Just Dance 3	Favorite Video Game	Won

=== 2012 Kids' Choice Awards ===
Year	Nominated work	Award	Result
2012	Just Dance 3	Favorite Game	Won

=== 2012 Teen Choice Awards ===
Year	Nominated work	Award	Result
2012	Just Dance 3	Choice Video Game	Won

== Other releases ==
A Target Edition was released in America, which included two exclusive songs, which are Rihanna's "Only Girl (In the World)" and B.o.B's "Airplanes", which are also included in the PAL Xbox 360 version. A Zellers Edition was released in Canada, which is exactly the same as the Target Edition.

A Best Buy Edition was also released in America, which included two exclusive songs, which are Katy Perry's "Teenage Dream" and "E.T.", which are also included in the PAL Special Edition.
