= The Countdown Singers =

- Also known as: Countdown, Countdown Big Band Orchestra, Countdown Country Singers, Countdown Dance Masters, Countdown Mix Masters, Countdown Orchestra & Singers
- Genre: Sound-alike
- Years active: 1994–present
- Label: Madacy Entertainment

The Countdown Singers is a name given to Madacy Entertainment's revolving group of studio musicians, used since 1994. They perform sound-alike cover versions of well-known songs. They have released over 80 albums.

== Other names ==
They are also known as The Countdown Kids (on children's releases), Countdown, Countdown Big Band Orchestra, Countdown Country Singers , Countdown Dance Masters, Countdown Mix Masters, and Countdown Orchestra & Singers. The same musicians also work on albums credited to The Starlight Singers, The Starlite Singers, The Starlight Orchestra, The Film Starlight Orchestra, The Starlight Orchestra & Singers, The Starlight Symphony and Starlight Symphony Orchestra.

== Discography ==
- #1 Country Hits (#61 Country)
- #1 Hits of the 80's
- 20 Best of '80s Country
- 20 Best of Country Love
- 20 Best of Dance
- 20 Best of Disco
- 20 Best of Dixieland
- 20 Best of Love at the Movies
- 20 Best of Love in the '80s
- 20 Best of the '80s
- 20 Country Favorites
- 20 Irish Sing-Along Favorites (#14 Top World Music)
- 50 Irish Favorites
- 80's Chartbusters
- 90's Chart Busters
- All Time Love
- Awesome 80's
- Best of Bluegrass
- Best of Country
- Best of Reggae
- Best of the 80's (#46 Indie)
- Best of Today's Movie Hits
- Blue Da Ba Dee: Dance Party
- Born To Be Wild
- Butterfly Kisses
- Caribbean Dance Mix
- Caribbean Fun in the Sun
- Celebration Party Mix
- Children's Classic Film Favorites
- Children's Film Favorites
- Classic Christmas Favorites Disc 2 (Disc 1 is credited to The Starlight Pop Orchestra)
- Christmas Classics Redneck Style (#26 Indie)
- Classic Country Love Songs
- Classic Rhythm & Blues
- Country Ladies
- Dance Hits '98
- Dance Party 2001
- Dance Party Mix 2000: Waiting for Tonight
- Disco Fever: Play That Funky Music
- Disco Hot Stuff
- Film Favorites: Music from the Movies (#43 Indie)
- Forever 80's (#15 Indie)
- Forever Disco (#28 Indie, #2 Electronic)
- Songs from Hair
- Hip Hop Grooves
- Hits from the 80's
- Hits of the 80's
- Hot & Spicy Salsa
- Hot & Spicy Salsa Hits Vol. 3
- Hot Hits: Children's Film Favorites
- Hot Hits: Country Hits
- Hot Hits: Hot Summer Hits
- Hot Hits: The Love Collection
- Hot Hits: The Roots of Reggae
- Hot Hits: Today's Movie Hits
- In A Christmas Mood (The Starlight Orchestra)
- Kayleigh
- Kiss the Bride...
- Latin Dance Party
- Latino
- Latino Mega Hits
- Like a G6
- Love at the Movies
- Love Songs from the Movies (#51 Billboard 200)
- Macarena Dance Dance Dance
- Mambo #5 (#194 Billboard 200, #15 CAN)
- Mega Mix Dance Party
- Melody of Love
- Men of Country
- Mob Hits
- Monster Mash and Other Songs of Horror (#99 Billboard 200, #21 Indie)
- Movie Hits
- My Love Is Your Love
- New Wave 80s
- Non Stop Disco Dance Mix
- Non Stop Hits: Rock n' Roll of the 70's
- Party in a Box: BBQ Party
- Party in a Box: Beach Party
- Party in a Box: Dance Party
- Party in a Box: Pool Party
- Party Mix
- Portrait of Broadway (2CD set)
- Power Mix
- Rainy Day Romance
- Reggae Fever: The Best of Reggae
- Reggae Sunshine
- Rock 'n Roll Reunion
- Saturday Night Fever/Grease
- Sci-Fi Movie Hits
- Silent Night (Christmas Album)
- Space Wars
- Sports Mix
- Tequila Party Vol. 1
- Today's Country (#58 Country)
- Today's Movie Hits
- Ultimate Dance
- Ultimate 80s
- Ultimate Club Mix
- Ultimate Dance Zone
- Ultimate Disco
- Ultimate Techno
- Wedding Collection
- Who Let the Girls Out
- Who Let the Boys Out

== See also ==
- Sound-alike
- Tribute album
- Cover version
- Studio musician
- The Hit Crew
