= Winter Rose =

Winter Rose may refer to:

- Winter rose, alternative name for the plant hellebore
- Winter Rose (novel), a 1996 fantasy novel by Patricia A. McKillip
- The Winter Rose, a novel by Jennifer Donnelly
- A Winter Rose, a 2014 film directed by Riz Story
- Winter Rose (band), a Canadian hard rock band
  - Winter Rose (album), 1989
- A Winter Rose, a carol composed by Alan Rees
- Winter (Winter Rose / Duet), a 2011 single released by South Korean duo Tohoshinki
- "Winter Rose/Love Awake", a song by Paul McCartney from Back to the Egg
- "Winter Rose", a song by Fairground Attraction, the B-side to "A Smile in a Whisper"
- "Winter Rose", a song by The Bees from the 2010 album Every Step's a Yes
- "Winter Rose", a song composed by Karliene, from the album "The Ballad of Anne Boleyn"
