= Sunshine Hit Me =

Studio album by The Bees
- Released: 25 March 2002 (UK); 25 February 2003 (U.S.)
- Recorded: 2001
- Genres: Indie rock; roots rock
- Length: 39:32
- Labels: We Love You (UK); Astralwerks (U.S.)
- Producers: Paul Butler; Aaron Fletcher

The Bees chronology
Sunshine Hit Me (2002)	Free The Bees (2004)

Singles from Sunshine Hit Me
- 1. "No Trophy" Released: January 2001; 2. "Punchbag" Released: June 2001; 3. "A Minha Menina" Released: June 2002

Professional ratings
Review scores
Source	Rating
Allmusic	link
BBC	Positive link
NME	link
Pitchfork Media	7.4/10 link
Stylus	C+ 01/09/03

Sunshine Hit Me is the debut album from the British band The Bees. At the time when the album was recorded the band only comprised Paul Butler and Aaron Fletcher, who wrote, performed and recorded the album alone using a home studio in Butler's parents' garden. Both Butler and Fletcher had been active in the Isle of Wight music scene for a while, performing in local indie/electronic outfits Pnu Riff and, more recently, the Exploding Thumbs. Butler had also guested on several other albums produced on the island, including some by Max Brennan.

The album is eclectic and summery, with a range of influences that include psychedelia, Jamaican dub, reggae, indie, 1960s rock and others. It earned a Mercury Music Prize nomination and also featured in the 2005 and 2008 editions of the book 1001 Albums: You Must Hear Before You Die by Robert Dimery. The main single "A Minha Menina" was used in a Citroën car advertisement, which also helped the band to get noticed. The track was also used in an advert for Magners Irish Cider in December 2008, as well as a Mars advertisement in Australia in 2002.

The band followed the album with several tours, which resulted in the band expanding into its current lineup in order to play the material live. However, all the members had played with Butler before on the island, whether in his other projects or simply in informal jams (whilst Butler and Fletcher produced and performed the album themselves, the entire six-piece is credited on the back sleeve). After the success of the album, the band signed to Virgin, and released their next album Free The Bees in 2004.

== Legacy ==
The album was included in the book 1001 Albums You Must Hear Before You Die.

== Track listing ==
1. "Punchbag" (Paul Butler, Aaron Fletcher) – 3:38
2. "Angryman" (Paul Butler, Aaron Fletcher) – 4:06
3. "No Trophy" (Paul Butler, Aaron Fletcher, Michael Clevitt) – 3:26
4. "Binnel Bay" (Paul Butler, Aaron Fletcher) – 2:57
5. "Sunshine" (Paul Butler, Aaron Fletcher, James Nye) – 3:27
6. "A Minha Menina" (Jorge Ben) – 2:48
7. "This Town" (Paul Butler, Aaron Fletcher) – 2:59
8. "Sweet Like a Champion" (Paul Butler, Aaron Fletcher) – 4:27
9. "Lying in the Snow" (Paul Butler, Aaron Fletcher) – 3:52
10. "Zia" (Paul Butler, Aaron Fletcher, James Nye) – 4:12
11. "Sky Holds the Sun" (Paul Butler, Aaron Fletcher) – 3:39

US Version Bonus Track

1. "You Got To Leave"

== Personnel ==
- Paul Butler – multi-instrumentation, production, recording, vocals
- Aaron Fletcher – multi-instrumentation, production, recording, vocals
- Michael Clevitt - bass guitar on "No Trophy"
- James Nye – keyboards & saxophone on "Sunshine" and "Zia"
