= She's Got Me Dancing =

Single by Tommy Sparks

from the album Tommy Sparks
- Released: May 4, 2009
- Recorded: 2009
- Length: 3:29
- Label: Island
- Songwriter(s): Tommy Sparks

Tommy Sparks singles chronology
| "I'm a Rope" (2009) | "She's Got Me Dancing" (2009) |

"She's Got Me Dancing" is a song by Tommy Sparks, with its music video directed by American comedian Eric Wareheim. It is the second song from his album, Tommy Sparks. The song was released for download and in shops on 4 May 2009. The song has been used occasionally in the media, being featured in the advertising for the PlayStation 3 game EyePet, television commercials for the iPod Touch and The Perfume Shop, the EA Sports video game FIFA 10, and the Ubisoft dance rhythm game Just Dance 3.

The track has also been used as the background to a number of television channel promos such as Comedy Central and E4. It was also used on the eleventh season of Dancing with the Stars for Kyle Massey and Lacey Schwimmer's samba.

== Charts ==
The single entered the UK Singles Chart at No. 28 on 10 May 2009.

| Chart (2009) | Peak position |
|---|---|
| UK Singles Chart | 22 |
