= Sherieta Lewis =

Sherieta Lewis, sometimes professionally identified as Sherieta, is a soul and reggae musician from Jamaica. She worked as a backing singer beginning in the mid-2000s, released solo singles in the 2010s, and released her debut EP, titled "Conversations in Key", in 2019.

== Biography ==
Sherieta Lewis is a pastor's daughter, and sang in church as a child. She began a degree in Popular Music Studies at the Edna Manley College of the Visual and Performing Arts, but left before graduating. While still a student in college in the 2000s she found a position as a backup singer to reggae musician Tarrus Riley, with whom she toured internationally. In the following years she also sang backing vocals for Marcia Griffiths, Duane Stephenson, and Diane King. She also worked as a songwriter and session musician for those musicians and others, including Damian Marley and Jah Cure. In the 2010s she released a handful of solo singles, on labels including Penthouse Records and Island Star. These included a cover of "Love Has Found Its Way" by Dennis Brown. She collaborated with Sean Diedrick, a keyboardist and fellow member of Marley's band, to release her debut EP, titled "Conversations in Key", in 2019. Lewis was billed mononymously as "Sherieta" on the record. The record contained seven songs, and was released on the Ghetto Youths International, run by the Marley family. The music on the record contained elements of soul, jazz, reggae, and R&B: Lewis referred to her sound as "exotique soul". She has cited Damian Marley, India Arie, and Beres Hammond as influences. She has sung with the ensemble music project Playing for Change. She continued to perform with Marley's band after releasing "Conversations in Key".
