= Sound-alike =

Musical style

A sound-alike of the Super Mario Bros. theme

A sound-alike is a recording intended to imitate the sound of a popular record, the style of a popular recording artist, or a current musical trend; the term also refers to the artists who perform on such recordings. In the voice-over world, it may also refer to those who recreate the voice and vocal mannerisms of a given celebrity's vocal performance (see also impersonator).

Sound-alikes are usually made as budget copies or "knockoffs" of popular recordings. The cost of writing and recording a new song that sounds similar to a popular song is usually negligible compared to the cost of music licensing for playing the original recording or the royalty fees to record a cover version. If the sound-alike recording is dissimilar enough to avoid infringing the original writer's copyright, the user of a sound-alike can evoke the spirit of a song, or sometimes make listeners believe that the work being played has been recorded by a particular artist, without the expense of engaging a highly paid artist.

A cover version is sometimes referred to as a sound-alike, but in the stricter sense, a sound-alike must contain differences that are significant enough to suggest to a listener that those recording the song sought to perform a work different from the work to which it sounds similar. A recording intended as an interpretation of a work is not a sound-alike; it is a cover version, for which many countries require licensing for any performance or distribution.

Sound-alike recordings have been used in movie soundtracks and radio and television commercials since their origin, while sound-alike artists have long recorded jingles and other musical material for commercial use.

Sound-alike albums have also long been issued by small, budget-minded record companies, as a way to cash in on the popular artists, movies or show tunes from hit plays currently in style. Lou Reed began his recording career working for one such company, Pickwick Records, but years later became a star in his own right, as an original performer. Other such companies were Hit Records of Nashville, Tennessee and Embassy Records of the United Kingdom. Bell Records of New York City also issued sound-alike budget records in the 1950s. Madacy Entertainment also releases sound-alike albums under the title the Countdown Singers; Drew's Entertainment currently releases sound-alikes through the name "the Hit Crew".

Sound-alike albums have been known to chart. In 1971, the sound-alike album Top of the Pops, Volume 18 reached No. 1 on the UK Albums Chart. A medley of sound-alike recordings of Beatles songs recorded by the Stars on 45 reached number one on several national charts in 1981. On February 3, 2012, a sound-alike version of the will.i.am track "T.H.E. (The Hardest Ever)" by Kings of Pop was available for download before the release of the original, and entered the UK Singles Chart at number 40, the first cover to do so (these types of singles are also known as pre-release cover versions). Other sound-alike covers of Flo Rida's "Whistle" and Maroon 5's "Payphone" by Can You Blow My and Precision Tunes respectively, also entered the top 40. In 2011, the same week Sak Noel's single "Loca People" reached No. 1 on the UK Singles Chart, a sound-alike version by CDM Chartbusters reached No. 55 on the charts.

Many of these sound-alike versions of popular songs available on download sites continue to generate strong download sales prior to the release of the original song.

Artists may record sound-alike versions of their own hit records in order to regain a degree of control over their own songs if the master recording rights are held by their record company. An early example of this is "Grandma Got Run Over by a Reindeer", whose original singer Elmo Shropshire re-recorded the song after he had sold his master recording rights in 1982 and was unable to get them back. The tactic gained attention in the late 2010s with the Taylor Swift masters dispute, in which Taylor Swift re-recorded nearly all of the albums whose master recording rights were held by Scooter Braun; the new "Taylor's Version" releases would become critically- and commercially-successful in their own right.

== Litigation ==
Sounds-alikes have sometimes been the subject of litigation. In 1969, a semi-professional singer named Vickie Jones made the headlines for impersonating Aretha Franklin at several shows in Florida, and escaped prosecution only because of the coercive treatment to which her manager had subjected her. In the 1980s, singer Bette Midler sued over a sound-alike version of her recording of "Do You Want to Dance?" being used in a commercial which sounded too close to the original. "Old Cape Cod" was the subject of a 1990 lawsuit subsequent to a sound-alike version of the Patti Page hit which was featured in a 1989 commercial for American Savings Bank. Page sued the advertising agency responsible for the commercial, alleging the commercial implied that Page, herself, endorsed the bank. Guitarist Carlos Santana sued over a commercial music bed which closely imitated his playing and arranging style.

In the early 1960s, a series of commercials for Kellogg's featured the character Snagglepuss, who spoke with an impersonation of Bert Lahr. The real Lahr did not mind being impersonated but objected to the voice being used in advertising; a settlement was reached in which Daws Butler received an on-screen voice credit in any commercials in which the character appeared, to avoid the assumption that Lahr (himself a spokesman for Frito-Lay) was endorsing the product.

== See also ==
- The Countdown Singers
- The Hit Crew
- Pre-release cover version
- Mockbuster - similar concept in relation to films
- Video game clone
