= Octopus (The Bees album) =

Studio album by The Bees
- Released: 26 March 2007
- Recorded: 2005–2006
- Genre: Indie rock, ska, neo-psychedelia
- Length: 36:24
- Label: Virgin Records; Astralwerks
- Producer: Paul Butler

The Bees chronology
Free The Bees (2004)	Octopus (2007)	Every Step's A Yes (2010)

Singles from Octopus
- 1. "Left Foot Stepdown" Released: November 2006 (download-only release); 2. "Who Cares What The Question Is?" Released: March 2007; 3. "Listening Man" Released: June 2007; 4. "(This Is For The) Better Days (Ashley Beedle Remix)" Released: 2008 (available as download through 'www.thebees.info')

Professional ratings
Review scores
Source	Rating
AllMusic	4/5 stars
Drowned in Sound	8/10
The Guardian	3/5 stars
Pitchfork Media	7.9

Octopus is the third album by the British band The Bees, released in 2007. Octopus was self-produced in the band's own basement studio, The Steam Rooms, on the Isle of Wight.

A high-rip version of Octopus was leaked in its entirety in December 2006, three months before its scheduled release. The leak also led to the album's initial release date of 19 March being moved to a week later.

The CD version of Octopus is also an enhanced disc, which enables owners of the album to join The Bees' mailing list and have access to exclusive free content, including a downloadable version of the "Who Cares What The Question Is?" music video.

== Critical reception ==
NME wrote: "On Octopus The Bees find their groove and sound blissfully unaware whether anyone else is listening. You should, they’ve made their best album yet." Clash wrote that "as multi-instrumentalists, The Bees create a magnificent, almost Spector-ish palette."

== Track listing ==
All songs written and performed by The Bees.

1. "Who Cares What the Question Is?" – 3:35
2. "Love in the Harbour" – 4:02
3. "Left Foot Stepdown" – 4:05
4. "Got to Let Go" – 5:23
5. "Listening Man" – 4:47
6. "Stand" – 4:13
7. "(This Is for The) Better Days" – 4:37
8. "The Ocularist" – 3:56
9. "Hot One!" – 2:45
10. "End of the Street" – 1:55

== Musicians ==
- Kris Birkin - Lead Guitar (1,7,9), Electric Guitar (2,3,5,7), Acoustic Twelve String Guitar (2), Claps (7), Vocals (8)
- Paul Butler - Vocals (1–10), Guitar (1), Piano (1,3,6,8), Electric Guitar (2,6,10), Tambourine (2,4), Drums (3–7,9,10), Trumpet (3,4,6), Hammond Organ (4,6), Saxophone (4,6), Triangle (5), Shakers (6,7,9), Recorder (6), Claps (7), Acoustic Guitar (8,10), Bongos (8), Cello (8), Sitar (8), Bell (9), Sound FX (10)
- Michael Clevett - Drums (1,2,8), Cowbell (1), Bass (3,4,6,7,9,10), Bongos (5,6), Vocals (7,8), Claps (7), Vocals (8)
- Aaron Fletcher - Vocals (1,7–9), Bass (2,5), Electric Guitar (4,7,9), Percussion (7), Claps (7,10), Acoustic Guitar (10), Sound FX (10)
- Warren Hampshire - Hammond Organ (1–3,5,7–9), Piano (3), Tambourine (5), Vocals (7,8), Claps (7), Jew's Harp (8)
- Carly Lacey - Claps (10)
- Heather McCallum - Flute (6), Claps (10)
- Andy Parkin - Saxophone (3)
- Itchy Parkin - Saxophone (3)
- Tim Parkin - Bass (1), Vocals (1,7–9), Harmonica (2), Trumpet (3–6), Trombone (3,10), Rhodes (4,7), Claps (7), Acoustic Guitar (8), Piano (9)
