= Grandpa Elliott =

New Orleans street-musician (1944–2022)

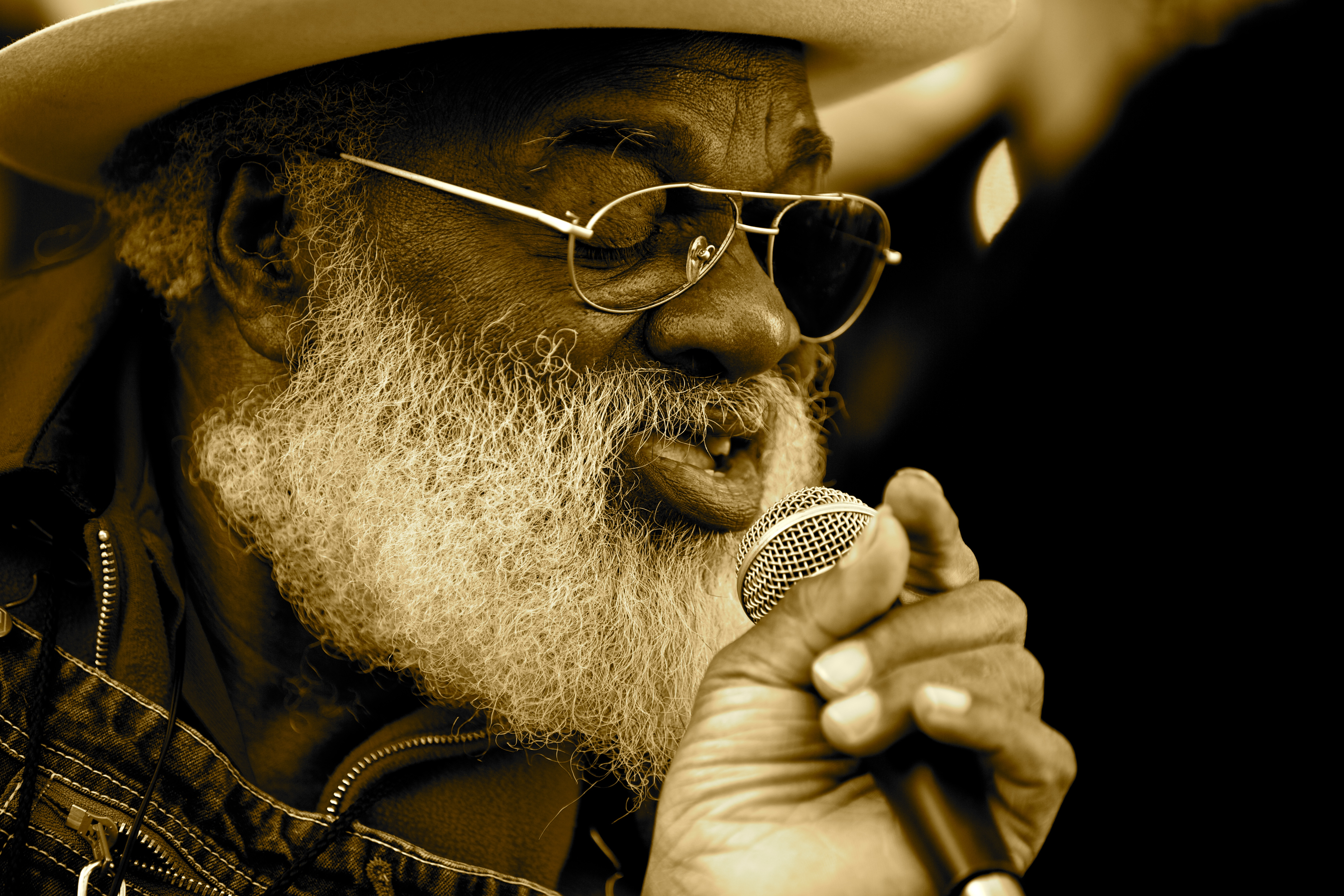
- Elliott on Royal Street in February 2013

Background information
- Born: Elliot Small; July 10, 1944; New Orleans, Louisiana, U.S.
- Died: March 8, 2022 (aged 77) Jefferson, Louisiana, U.S.
- Occupation: Street musician
- Instrument: Harmonica

Elliot Small (July 10, 1944 – March 8, 2022), known as Grandpa Elliott was a veteran street-musician in New Orleans, Louisiana. He played the harmonica, sang, and was a street icon in New Orleans.

== Early life ==
Grandpa Elliott was born as Elliot Small on July 10, 1944 in New Orleans, Louisiana. Growing up in the Lafitte Housing Projects, Small developed a love of music as a young boy, in part to deal with the pains of an unhappy home life. Small's uncle was a professional musician who worked with Lloyd Washington of the Ink Spots, and often let his nephew come to the Dew Drop Inn to hear them play. One day when his uncle left for work without his harmonica, Small picked it up and put it to his mouth. "Oooh, it was awful," he said, laughing. "He chewed tobacco. I had to sterilize that thing." The uncle gave young Elliott a harmonica, and he fell in love with the sound of the mouth harp, teaching himself by playing along with the music on his mama's radio. At home, Small's mother favored classical music, giving the youngster diverse tastes at an early age. Teaching himself to dance from watching Fred Astaire movies on television, Small began performing on street corners for change, dancing while singing and playing his harmonica.

"They brought me to New York to tap on Broadway when I was 6 or 7, and my mama got killed up there," he said. The man they lived with beat them both and ended up killing his mother. After it happened, his grandmother brought Small back to New Orleans and gave him and his older sister Frances a good life. "She was a sweet old lady," he said. "My stepfather was a man who did not love his child," he said. "But my uncle would come to the house, and play the harmonica to me."

== Early career ==
As a young man, Small then made the rounds as a soul singer in local clubs. He recorded singles with arranger Wardell Quezergue, some of which are available on Malaco and Tuff City Records compilations of New Orleans funk. In the early '60s, Small's family relocated to New York City, where he took his first steps as a professional entertainer. Small once again played on the streets in between regular gigs, which included a role in a stage revival of Show Boat, helped the Louisiana vocal group The Dixie Cups go up to New York, opened on tour with The Temptations, and cut a few of his own R&B singles. One was entitled "I'm a Devil," recorded for Bang! Records. and Small promoted the record with live appearances while wearing what some fans remember as a red devil's suit complete with horns and pitchfork. "Well, it wasn't called a devil suit," he said. "It was a pretty, silk red suit, that looked good. It was a nice show." At the time, Small remembered, he was billed as "The Harmonica King." He also recorded his own "Girls Are Made for Lovin'" in 1969, a Wardell Quezergue ("Big Q") production which has the feel of something by Curtis Mayfield, maybe, or Smokey Robinson. It's not an identifiably New Orleans record, although it was made there, originally released on the New Sound label and picked up by Bang.

Small recorded the funk song "E-Ni-Me-Ni-Mi-Ni-Mo" at Sea-Saint Studios in New Orleans, probably in 1975. Small produced the session and co-wrote the song along with Quezergue and guitarist Teddy Royal. Malaco purchased the master in 1976 and released it as a two-part single, which was a commercial failure.

By the '80s, Small had become dissatisfied with life in New York, the grueling schedule of performing in local clubs and on the road, and the music business in general. Bad decisions and unfair contracts had soured him on the industry. When the sight in his good eye started to go and everything got fuzzy, he signed away the rights to one of his songs. "It was to a guy I had taken a liking to, a guy I trusted," he said. Small moved back to New Orleans and took his music to the streets, where it would belong only to him and to the passersby who heard it.

Small developed the persona of Grandpa Elliott, an old man dressed in blue denim overalls, a bright red shirt, Santa beard, and a floppy hat who played blues harp and sang for the street traffic on his corner at Royal and Toulouse streets in the French Quarter, right where he started out. He often teamed with guitarist Michael "Stoney B" Stone and they have become an institution in New Orleans for the people who stopped to listen to them and throw change in their bucket. His act was even written up in The New York Times in 1995. He arrived here most mornings by taxi and spent his days singing his soulful songs and playing his harmonica. It's the place where everybody knows his name. "When I feel sick, I come out here to feel better," he said. "The French Quarter is my medicine." Small said he doesn't even know what beer tastes like and he's never touched drugs and the only thing he smoked was the exhaust from the cars that pass Royal and Toulouse.

His listeners rewarded him with dollar bills and treasures, like the gold wedding band he wore on his finger. "A lot of people walk around with plastic now instead of cash, so they throw what they can," he said. "Some of the rings I get out of my bucket even have diamonds on them."

== Playing for Change ==
Small did not completely lose his sight to glaucoma until 2005. It was in that year that recording engineer and producer Mark Johnson launched a project called Playing for Change, dedicated to promoting international unity through music. He began recording performances by street performers from around the world. Johnson heard Roger Ridley sing the Ben E. King hit, "Stand by me" in Santa Monica and immediately began recording him and other street musicians like Small, making their performance the centerpiece of a video featuring performances of the number by a handful of artists. In 2009, after the "Stand by Me" video was posted online, it racked up 177,097,721 plays on YouTube (March 9, 2022), and suddenly Small had an international audience. Small signed on for a tour with a band of musicians affiliated with the Playing for Change project. He has also been on The Tonight Show and The Colbert Report. He performed to a crowd of more than 40,000 at Dodger Stadium, Los Angeles, California, on June 30, 2009, playing the "Star Spangled Banner" on harmonica and singing "God Bless America." Later that same year, the Playing for Change Band came to New Orleans to accompany Small on his debut CD Sugar Sweet, released November 3, 2009, an eclectic collection that includes gospel, blues, soul and what Small called "some strong love songs." Keb Mo' also accompanied on the album. Small is the first artist to be signed to Playing for Change Records/Concord Music Group. The whole experience taught him to trust people again. "Mark Johnson changed my life," he said. "He made me lift my head up." Small has been featured on Playing for Change in several episodes.

== Selected discography ==
- Sugar Sweet (2009)

== Personal life ==
Small died in a hospital in Jefferson, Louisiana from complications of a skin infection on March 8, 2022, at the age of 77.
