= The Ramblin' Riversiders =

The Ramblin' Riversiders is a British skiffle band based in Lancashire. It was started in 1956 by teenager Harold Dearden and a group of his schoolboy friends. They had been impressed by the success of Lonnie Donegan's song The Rock Island Line, and they thought they could make similar music. The band was started in Dearden's backyard shed and was soon enjoying professional bookings around the region. Its early success was achieved without any involvement by adults.

In 2006, the band celebrated its 50th consecutive year in existence. Since the early days it has had its ups and downs, but it has always been active in some way, with Dearden doing vocals and playing the ukulele and fellow founder Neil Farnworth playing rhythm guitar. It has recorded many albums over the years, and has tried many musical genres both British and American, including bluegrass, folk, Western and country. Memorable engagements from the early days include playing by request for 1,400 people at the Preston Gujarat Society, and at the Marine Hall in Fleetwood.

In the early 2000s the band made several successful U.S. tours, being awarded the Best Old Time American Music Band on their first visit to the Annual National Old Time Country and Bluegrass Festival in Missouri Valley, Iowa. On their second visit to the festival, they were named a Rising Legend. In 2008, band member George Pritchard sang and played a Zydeco-style washboard at the annual Washboard Festival in Logan, Ohio.
