= Playing for Change =

World music movement and multimedia project

Playing for Change is a multimedia music project, featuring musicians and singers from across the globe, co-founded in 2002 by Mark Johnson and Whitney Kroenke. Playing for Change also created in 2007 a separate non-profit organization called the Playing for Change Foundation, which builds music and art schools for children around the world.

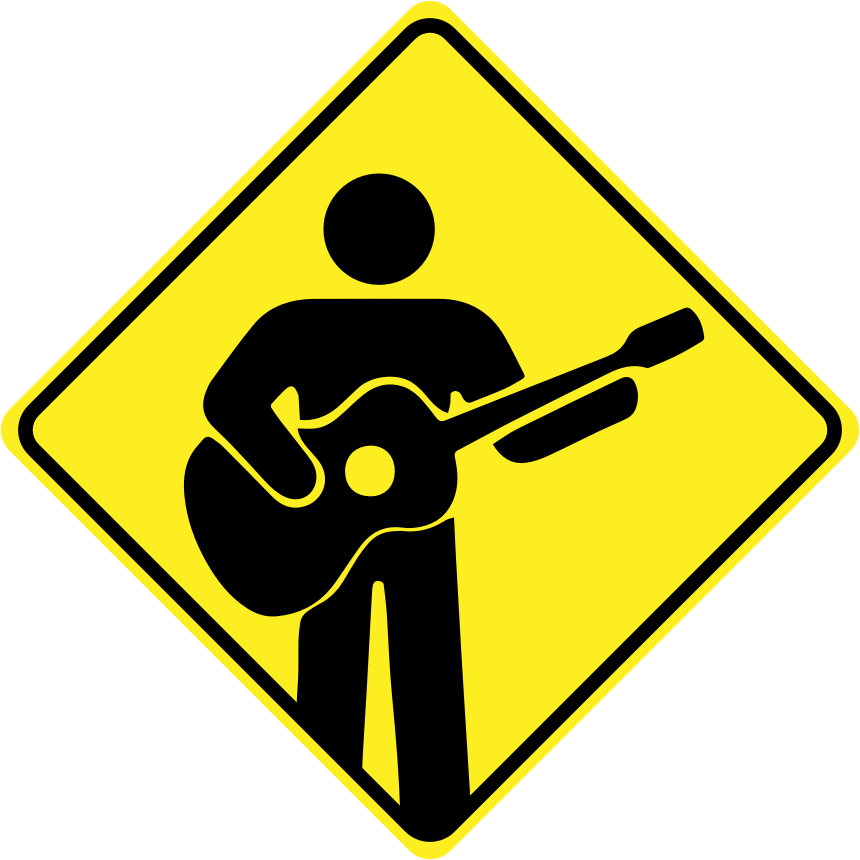
Playing for Change (PFC) logo

== Origin ==
Playing For Change (PFC) was founded in 2002 by Mark Johnson and Whitney Kroenke. Mark Johnson was walking in Santa Monica, California, when he heard the voice of Roger Ridley (deceased in 2005) singing "Stand By Me"; it was this experience that sent Playing For Change on its mission to connect the world through music.

Travelling the world with a small film and recording team, producers Johnson and Enzo Buono developed a mobile recording studio (originally powered by golf cart batteries) for recording and filming musicians live outdoors, and progressively editing all the separate artists, blending all into one performance as PFC travelled from artist to artist, country to country. Starting with a studio-made demo in the right key and tempo, "we would deconstruct [the track]" as each recorded musician could listen with headphones to what had been recorded before them, and playing the same song, adding into the mix their own style. For the project Johnson has recorded and filmed music in more than 50 countries across the world.

More than 150—mostly street—musicians from 25 countries have combined their talents to create a global phenomenon with millions of followers across the world. Artists participating or openly involved in the project are Mermans Mosengo, Marcus King, Lukas Nelson, Char, Orbe Ortiz, Paulo Heman, Peter Bunetta, Roberto Luti, Titi Tsira, Jason Tamba, Keiko Komaki, Vusi Mahlasela, Louis Mhlanga, Clarence Bekker, David Guido Pietroni, Tal Ben Ari (Tula), Bono, Keb' Mo', David Broza, Manu Chao, Grandpa Elliott, Keith Richards, The Pocket Queen, Toots Hibbert from Toots & the Maytals, Taj Mahal, Stephen Marley, Jerron "Blind Boy" Paxton, and Washboard Chaz. This resulted in the documentary A Cinematic Discovery of Street Musicians that won the Audience Award at the Woodstock Film Festival in September 2008.

In April 2009, the first album was released with ”Songs Around the World” a collection of the first years of the multimedia project, debuted at number 10 on Billboard's Pop Chart. The band's version of the Ben E. King classic—which interwove the performances of 18 street musicians, including a South African choir—in 2012 had more than 40 million views on YouTube alone. The Playing for Change Band, an international touring band that brings artists of all backgrounds together, raising money and awareness for the foundation, features individual musicians from across the globe that the multimedia project has met through the years of travelling, recording and filming, and is regularly touring the world to spread the word of the basis of the Playing For Change foundation.

During their travels the project met and recorded many musicians from across the globe, some of whom lived in underprivileged communities, Playing For Change project decided to give something back. After the making of two documentaries about the multimedia project, Playing for Change: A Cinematic Discovery of Street Musicians, and Playing For Change: Peace Through Music, the founders of Playing For Change project created the Playing For Change Foundation, a separate 501(c)(3) nonprofit organization. PFC was approached by the United Nations Population Fund to celebrate via a virtual concert the United Nations' 75th anniversary in December 2020.

== Musical collaborations ==
● PFC has recorded more than 1,000 musicians from 50+ countries

● PFC has worked with Kiran Nepali, Bono (from the band U2), Keith Richards (from the band The Rolling Stones), Manu Chao, Toots Hibbert, Ziggy Marley, Keb' Mo', Baaba Maal, Char, Tinariwen, Los Lobos, Jackson Browne, Taj Mahal, Jimmy Buffett, Sara Bareilles, Maroon 5, Robert Plant, John Densmore, Stephen Marley, Bombino, Bill Kreutzmann (from the band Grateful Dead), David Crosby, Chad Smith (from the Red Hot Chili Peppers), Jason Mraz, Josh Groban, Jake Shimabukuro, Yo-Yo Ma, Citizen Cope, Bernie Williams, Trombone Shorty, Buddy Guy, The Doobie Brothers (Tom Johnston, John McFee and Pat Simmons), Jack Johnson, Ben Harper, Tom Morello, Nattali Rize Billy Branch James Gadson, Pancho Amat, Warren Haynes, Ivan and Cyril Neville, Rocky Dawuni, David Guido Pietroni, Jon Cleary, Donald Kinsey, Lee Oskar (from the band War), Robbie Robertson, Dr. John, Ringo Starr, Aloe Blacc, Angélique Kidjo, Annie Lennox, Becky G, Brandi Carlile with Mike McCready of Pearl Jam, Carlos Santana and Cindy Blackman Santana, Gabi Melim, Gary Clark Jr., Jim James, Mavis Staples, Nathaniel Rateliff, Peter Gabriel, Rhiannon Giddens, Robert Randolph, Run The Jewels with Josh Homme, Sheila E., Skip Marley and Cedella Marley, The War and Treaty, Sherieta Lewis, and Steve Miller.

== Playing For Change Foundation ==
Since 2007 the Playing for Change Foundation, a 501(c)(3) non-profit organization, has created and supported fifteen music school programs across eleven developing countries:

- Imvula Music Program, Gugulethu, South Africa
- Bizung School of Music & Dance, Tamale, Ghana
- Udayapur Nepal Music Program, Udayapur District, Nepal
- Ecole de Musique de Kirina, Kirina, Mali
- Tintale Village Mother's Society, Nepal
- Ubuntu Music Program, Kigali, Rwanda
- Mitrata Nepal Village Music Program, Kathmandu, Nepal
- Musica Music Institute, Kathmandu, Nepal
- Khlong Toey Music Program, Bangkok, Thailand
- Cajuru Music Program, Curitiba, Brazil
- Mirpur Music Program, Dhaka, Bangladesh
- Joudour Sahara Music Program, M'Hamid El Ghizlane, Morocco
- Playing For Change Patagonia, Patagonia, Argentina
- Baja Musical Arts Intensive, Tijuana, Mexico
- PFC Diamante, Argentina Diamante, Argentina

In 2011, the Playing For Change Foundation established an annual Playing For Change Day. The goal of Playing For Change Day is to "unite a global community through the power of music to affect positive social change". In 2012, the PFC Day consisted of over 330 events across 52 countries and helped raise over $150,000 for the Playing For Change Foundation, and in 2014, PFC Day saw over 400 events in 60 countries. It is held on the Saturday nearest the United Nations' International Day of Peace, which takes place each year on September 21. In 2015, Playing for Change Day was celebrated on September 19. The sixth-annual Playing for Change Day was on September 24, 2016.

In 2019, the Playing For Change Foundation was awarded the Polar Music Prize.

=== Impact award ===
Since 2022, the Playing For Change Foundation annually presents their honorary Impact Award, honoring artists and music icons for their mission of creating positive change through music and arts education while being able to continue their worldwide impact. The first ever winners of the Impact Award were music icons Luis Fonsi and Paula Abdul. The recipients to date have been:

Year	Recipient	Country	Work	Honored for	Ref
2022	Paula Abdul	US	Musician	their contributions to change through the power of music.	
2022	Luis Fonsi	Puerto Rico	Musician	their contributions to change through the power of music.	
2023	Maluma	Colombia	Musician	his contribution to the long-term success and development of future musical artists - nurturing their passion and creativity starting at a young age.	
2024	Ellie Goulding	UK	Musician	using their artist platforms to support their tireless and longstanding commitment to philanthropy and empowering others own belief in the transformative power of music.	
2024	Andrea Bocelli	Italy	Musician	using their artist platforms to support their tireless and longstanding commitment to philanthropy and empowering others own belief in the transformative power of music.	
2024	Veronica Bocelli	Italy	Actress	using their artist platforms to support their tireless and longstanding commitment to philanthropy and empowering others own belief in the transformative power of music.	
2024	Diplo	US	Musician	using their artist platforms to support their tireless and longstanding commitment to philanthropy and empowering others own belief in the transformative power of music.	
2025	The Marley Family	Jamaica	Musician	for their dedication to social change through music.	
2025	Juanes	Colombia	Musician	for their dedication to social change through music.	
2025	Anitta	Brazil	Musician	for their dedication to social change through music.	

== Discography ==
Year	Album title	Performers	Countries	Notable achievements
2009	Playing For Change: Songs Around The World	100 musicians	21	• Debuted #10 on Top 200 Billboard Chart 2009 • #1 on World Music Charts 200 • AP Top Ten album of the year 2009 • Platinum Award - Brazil
2010	Playing For Change Live			
2011	PFC 2: Songs Around The World	150 musicians	25	• Debuted #1 Billboard World Music Charts 2011 • Platinum Award - Brazil
2014	PFC 3: Songs Around The World	185 musicians	31	• Debuted #1 on the 2014 FNAC charts in Brazil
2018	Playing For Change: Listen To The Music	210 musicians	25	

== See also ==
- World music
- Street performance
