= Tommy Sparks (album) =

Studio album by Tommy Sparks
- Released: 11 May 2009 (UK)
- Genre: Alternative dance, new wave, synthpop
- Label: Island
- Producer: Mike Crossey

Tommy Sparks is the self-titled debut studio album from the musician Tommy Sparks. It contains 10 tracks written by Tommy Sparks and produced by Mike Crossey. It was released through Island Records on 11 May 2009 in the United Kingdom. The album features his singles "I'm A Rope" and "She's Got Me Dancing". The single "Miracle" was released in August.

== Track listing ==
No.	Title	Length
1.	"Much Too Much"	3:24
2.	"She's Got Me Dancing"	3:29
3.	"These Things Happen"	3:30
4.	"Miracle"	3:08
5.	"Brand New Love"	3:33
6.	"I'm a Rope"	2:19
7.	"Kill the Summer"	4:04
8.	"Velo Arktis"	3:31
9.	"Hammer"	4:33
10.	"Health Club"	3:52
11.	"Weekend's Over"	3:16
12.	"Messages" (featuring Filthy Dukes)	3:20

== Music videos ==
- "I'm a Rope", directed by Max Vitali
- "She's Got Me Dancing", directed by Eric Wareheim
- "Miracle", directed by Shelley Love
