= Every Step's a Yes =

Studio album by The Bees
- Released: 11 October 2010
- Recorded: 2008–2010
- Genre: Indie rock
- Label: Fiction Records
- Producer: Paul Butler

The Bees chronology
Octopus (2007)	Every Step's a Yes (2010)

Singles from Every Step's a Yes
- 1. "Silver Line" Released: July 2010; 2. "I Really Need Love" Released: October 2010; 3. "Winter Rose" Released: December 2010

Every Step's a Yes is the fourth studio album from British band The Bees, released on 11 October 2010. It is the band's first for their current label Fiction Records. It was preceded by the single "I Really Need Love", out on 4 October. The song "Silver Line" was released as a free download on the band's official tumblr page.

The band have described the record as having a "mature" sound, with "proper songs that are more about real life". They also claimed that the time frontman Paul Butler spent in Los Angeles recording Devendra Banhart's album What Will We Be and in the Amazon rainforest helped influence the sound of the album, giving a sense of rhythm and groove seldom heard on previous efforts and gaining "a different approach to recording".

== Track listing ==
All songs written and performed by The Bees.

1. "I Really Need Love"
2. "Winter Rose"
3. "Silver Line"
4. "No More Excuses"
5. "Tired of Loving"
6. "Change Can Happen"
7. "Island Love Letter"
8. "Skill of the Man"
9. "Pressure Makes Me Lazy"
10. "Gaia"
