= Tommy Sparks =

Musical artist

- Born: Thomas Sparks; 7 February 1986 (age 40)
- Origin: Gothenburg, Sweden
- Genres: Pop
- Occupations: Singer-songwriter, musician
- Instrument: Vocals
- Years active: 2009-present

Thomas Sparks (born 7 February 1986) is a Swedish-born English singer-songwriter from London. He is known for his songs "She's Got Me Dancing" and "I'm a Rope". His self-titled album was released on 11 May 2009 in the United Kingdom. He co-wrote The Prodigy song "Wild West" featured on the bonus disc for Invaders Must Die. He also features on the Filthy Dukes album Nonsense in the Dark on the song "Messages".

A clip of "She's Got Me Dancing" was used by Apple in the iPod Touch "Next Level Fun" television commercial as well as being featured in the soundtrack for the video game by EA Sports, FIFA 10. The song was included in the Ubisoft's Just Dance 3 video game and was featured in the game's trailer during the 2011 Gamescom. It was also used in an advertisement for the Sony Eyepet. The song "I'm a Rope" featured in the soundtrack of Codemaster's racing game Colin McRae: DiRT 2.

Tommy Sparks has also gone on to form a new band called Health Club.

He currently plays synths and guitar in Kele Okereke's solo band 'Kele'

== Discography ==
=== Studio albums ===
Year	Album details
2009	Tommy Sparks: Release date: 11 May 2009; Label: Island Records

=== Singles ===
Year	Single	Peak positions	Album
Year	Single	UK	Album
2009	"I'm a Rope"	—	Tommy Sparks
2009	"She's Got Me Dancing"	22	Tommy Sparks
