= Free the Bees =

Studio album by The Bees
- Released: 17 August 2004
- Recorded: 2003–2004, Abbey Road Studios
- Genre: Indie rock, rock and roll, garage rock, psychedelic rock, ska
- Length: 43:57
- Label: Virgin (United Kingdom); Astralwerks/EMI (United States)
- Producer: Paul Butler

The Bees chronology
Sunshine Hit Me (2002)	Free the Bees (2004)	Octopus (2007)

Singles from Free the Bees
- 1. "Wash in the Rain" Released: April 2004; 2. "Horsemen" Released: June 2004; 3. "One Glass of Water" Released: October 2004; 4. "Chicken Payback" Released: April 2005

Free the Bees is the second album from British band The Bees in 2004. Their first release for Virgin Records, it is also the first album to feature the current sextet that evolved during the tour that promoted debut album Sunshine Hit Me.

The album was originally planned to be recorded in Butler's shed (the same one where Sunshine Hit Me was produced). However, the band decided to record it at the famous Abbey Road Studios, bringing a more slick and uptempo sound than their debut.

"Chicken Payback" was released as a single in April 2005 and reached No. 28 in the UK Singles Chart.

Professional ratings
Review scores
Source	Rating
Allmusic	link
Collective	link
Drowned In Sound	(8/10) link
Pitchfork Media	(4.9/10) 23/08/04
PopMatters	(favourable) 28/07/05
Stylus Magazine	(D+) 16/7/04
Tiny Mix Tapes	link

== Track listing ==
1. "These Are the Ghosts" (The Bees) – 3:08
2. "Wash in the Rain" (The Bees, Julian Batley) – 3:38
3. "No Atmosphere" (The Bees) – 3:48
4. "Horsemen" (The Bees) – 3:27
5. "Chicken Payback" (The Bees) – 3:12
6. "The Russian" (The Bees) – 5:36
7. "I Love You" (The Bees) – 4:35
8. "The Start" (The Bees) – 2:19
9. "Hourglass" (The Bees, Julian Batley) – 4:45
10. "Go Karts" (The Bees) – 3:43
11. "One Glass of Water" (The Bees) – 2:41
12. "This Is the Land" (The Bees) – 3:01

US version bonus tracks

1. "It Isn't Exact" (Demo)
2. "These Are The Ghosts" (Undead Version)

Japanese version bonus track

1. "Nothin" (Live)

== Personnel ==
- Kris Birkin – guitar, vocals
- Paul Butler – lead vocals, guitar, piano, saxophone, trumpet, clarinet, mandolin, drums, percussion, producer
- Michael Clevett – drums, percussion, bass, Hammond organ, vocals
- Warren Hampshire – Hammond organ, piano, celeste, acoustic guitar, percussion, vocals
- Aaron Fletcher – bass, guitar, piano, drums, percussion, vocals
- Tim Parkin – vocals, trumpet, bass, piano, Rhodes piano, percussion
