= The Bees (English band) =

English band

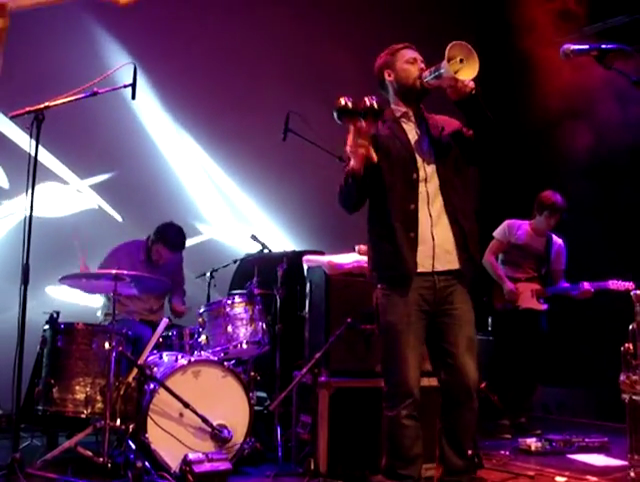
- The Bees (Rotterdam, 2011)

Background information
- Also known as: A Band of Bees (U.S. name)
- Origin: Ventnor, Isle of Wight, England
- Genres: Indie rock, psychedelic rock
- Years active: 2001–present
- Labels: Virgin Records (formerly We Love You) (UK); Astralwerks (US); ATO Records; Fiction Records (UK); MapleMusic Recordings (Canada)
- Members: Paul Butler; Aaron Fletcher; Kris Birkin; Michael Clevett; Tim Parkin; Warren Hampshire; Tom Gardner

The Bees (known in the United States as A Band of Bees) are an English band from Ventnor on the Isle of Wight. Although their sound is generally classified as indie rock or psychedelic rock, the band have a varied range of styles and influences, such as 1960s garage rock, country, reggae and jazz.

== History ==
The Bees have released four albums: 2002's Mercury Prize-nominated Sunshine Hit Me, its 2004 major label follow-up Free the Bees (which was recorded at Abbey Road Studios), and 2007's Octopus. Their fourth album, Every Step's A Yes, was released on 11 October 2010.

The first two albums featured songs that have been used in British television advertisements, which are partially responsible for the band's recognition: Sunshine Hit Me's "A Minha Menina", a cover of an Os Mutantes track (originally by Jorge Ben), appeared in a Citroën car commercial and also an advert for Magners Irish Cider, whilst "Chicken Payback" and "Wash in the Rain", both from Free the Bees, were incorporated in adverts for Sure Deodorant for Men and Sainsbury's, respectively. "Chicken Payback" was also used to introduce the Northern comic character Stan Hibbert on Sky Sports' Soccer AM, as well as the 'bed' track for The Radcliffe and Maconie programme on BBC Radio 6 Music. The official video for "Chicken Payback" featured the band in an arcade-type dance game machine in a Japanese video arcade. The lead character, apparently a rock and roll dance diva, dances so quickly that his shoes catch fire. The song was used in a 60-second flagship advert produced by Karmarama commissioned by Age UK to launch the charity's 2011 "Thank You" campaign. It was performed by 81-year-old Joy Graham accompanied by a jazz orchestra and was directed by BAFTA winning director Becky Martin of Channel 4 sitcom Peep Show.

The Bees supported Oasis in 2005, and Madness in December 2007 during their Christmas tour, and supported Paul Weller in the UK on selected dates of his "Winter Arena Tour". In 2010, The Bees performed a set for The Sun, covering "We Speak No Americano" and playing songs from their album, Every Step's A Yes. Paul Butler appeared on stage at the Glastonbury Festival in 2010 with Devendra Banhart, after performing two sets of their own.

In 2011, The Bees supported Fleet Foxes on their UK tour.

One of the influences the Bees have cited is the mind-altering drink called ayahuasca. Butler came to drink this plant medicine with shamans in Peru after being introduced to it by Banhart. "The whole thing has brought a lot of joy into my life. I think this kind of cleansing helps with your natural rhythm. Everyone has a song within them or a rhythm that is individual and personal only to you … and this kind of activity unlocks that."

In 2018, Fletcher and Parkin announced that they had formed a new group, 77:78. Their debut album Jellies was released through Heavenly Recordings on 5 July 2018.

In 2019, actor Martin Freeman cited The Bees' 2004 album Free the Bees as his favourite 00s album in a show for BBC Radio 6 Music.

In 2022, the band's guitarist Kris Birkin appeared on the lineup for the second edition of Drumming and Strumming for Shanklin Theatre, a virtual charity concert raising money for Shanklin Theatre on the Isle of Wight.

In 2023 Butler announced that he was working remotely with Fletcher on new Bees material.

In 2024, The Bees reunited for a short British tour, which included dates in Manchester, London, Bristol, Leeds and Brighton. The dates marked the band's first shows since 2014.

In August 2025, Fletcher was the special guest DJ at Ventnor Fringe, performing a set as part of the Last Night of the Fringe.

In November 2025, The Bees launched a Kickstarter to fund a documentary about the group. Sonic Sunshine - Stories from The Bees will cover the band’s formation to their ten-year hiatus, to their 2024 reunion tour.

== Members ==
- Paul Butler – lead vocals, guitar, piano, clarinet, mandolin, drums, various Percussion instruments, saxophone, trumpet
- Aaron Fletcher – bass guitar, guitar, piano, drums, percussion, lyrics, vocals
- Tom Gardner – drums, bass guitar
- Tim Parkin – bass guitar, piano, rhodes, percussion, vocals, trumpet
- Warren Hampshire – hammond organ, celesta, acoustic guitar, percussion, jew's harp, vocals
- Kris Birkin – guitar, vocals
- Jon McMullen - guitar
- Michael Clevett - drums, percussion, bass, Hammond, vocals
- Darren Pink - mellotron
- Chris Stankovich - 7-string electric balzouki

== Discography ==
=== Studio albums ===
- Sunshine Hit Me (25 March 2002; We Love You (UK) / Astralwerks (US)
- Free the Bees (17 August 2004; Virgin (UK) / Astralwerks (US) - UK No. 26
- Octopus (26 March 2007; Virgin (UK) / Astralwerks (US) - UK No. 26
- Every Step's a Yes (11 October 2010; Fiction Records (UK) - UK No. 64

=== Compilations ===
- The Bees Present: The Sound Selection (2008)

=== EPs ===
- You Got to Leave EP: "You Got to Leave" / "Elain" / "Whistle Chop" / "Jackel Head" (March 2002)
- Listening Man EP: "Listening Man" (Radio Edit) / "Not Fade Away" (Buddy Holly cover) / "I Still Got Your Number" / "Listening Man" (Album Version) (2007)

=== Singles ===
From Sunshine Hit Me

- "No Trophy" (7" only release, January 2001)
- "Punchbag" (June 2001)
- "A Minha Menina" (June 2002)

From Free The Bees

- "Wash in the Rain" (April 2004) - UK No. 31
- "Horsemen" (June 2004) - UK No. 41
- "One Glass of Water" (7" and download-only release, October 2004)
- "Chicken Payback" (April 2005) - UK No. 28

From Octopus

- "Left Foot Stepdown" (download-only release, November 2006)
- "Who Cares What the Question Is?" (March 2007) - UK No. 53
- "Listening Man" (June 2007) - UK No. 91
- "(This Is For The) Better Days" (Ashley Beedle Remix) (Available as download through 'www.thebees.info', 2008)

From The Bees Present 'The Sound Selection'

- "Papa Echo" (UK download-only release, July 2008) / (US Split 7" with Mother Hips, 2008)

From Every Step's a Yes

- "Silver Line" (July 2010)
- "I Really Need Love" (October 2010)
- "Winter Rose" (December 2010)

Digital Only Release

- "Go Where You Wanna Go" (February 2011) (As used in UK 'Travelodge' TV advert)

=== Collaborations ===
- "Off the Lip" (aspects and The Bees, August 2004)
- "Bill Murray" (Gorillaz and The Bees, 2005)
