= Drew's Entertainment =

U.S. record label

- Parent company: TUTM Entertainment, Inc.
- Founded: 1994
- Genre: Various
- Country of origin: United States
- Location: Greenbrook, New Jersey, U.S.
- Official website: www.drewsent.com

Drew's Entertainment, also known as TUTM Entertainment, Inc., located in Greenbrook, New Jersey, is a record label company that produces sound-alike and cover versions of songs. Their music compilations have sold over 40 million copies since 1994.

Drew's Entertainment albums consist of cover songs; often the songs are "tributes" to artists, programmed around a theme to be used at a party, and theoretically allowing the host to play one album without having to create their own mix CD or act as a DJ.

Drew's Entertainment has had several placements in feature films, television ads, video games, and YouTube videos.

== Company history ==
They began in 1994 as Turn Up The Music, Inc. and formerly had two labels – Drew's Famous Party Music and DJ's Choice – which were consolidated under the name Drew's Famous. Song performances are usually credited to The Hit Crew, a name used by the company for their revolving group of session musicians.

== Awards ==
Several releases have garnered awards.

=== Drew’s Famous: Party Music ===
- RIAA Certified Gold
- RIAA Certified Platinum

=== Drew’s Famous: Halloween Party Music ===
- RIAA Certified Gold

=== DJ’s Choice: Kid Fun – Games, Songs & Sing-A-Longs ===
- RIAA Certified Gold

=== Drew’s Famous: Ultimate Halloween Party Favorites ===
- Sung by The Hit Crew, reached number 62 on Billboard 200 November 13, 2010.

=== Drew’s Famous: Ultimate Halloween Party Favorites ===
- Sung by The Hit Crew, reached number 163 on The Billboard 200 October 30, 2010.
